= The Oak Ridge Boys discography =

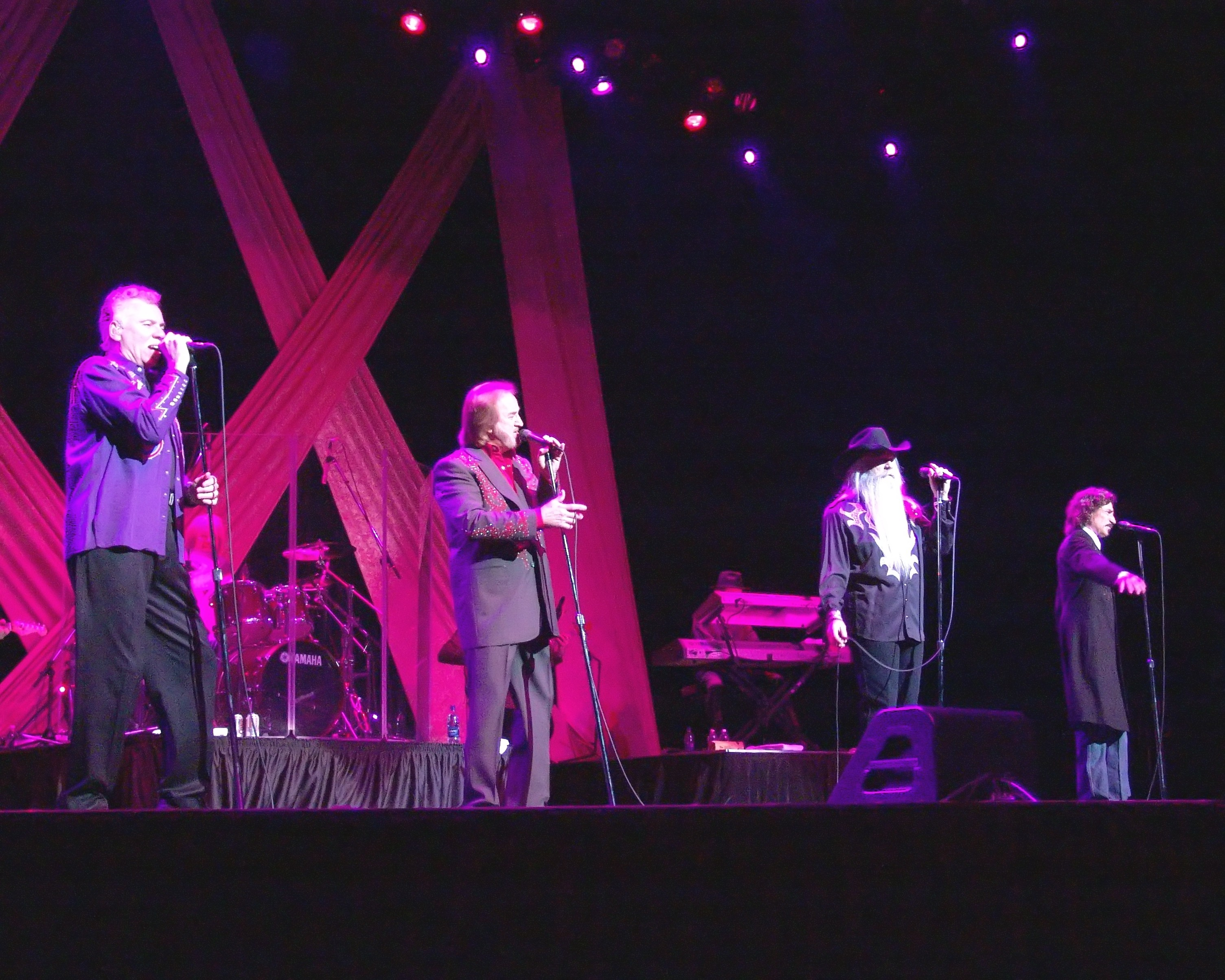
- Studio albums: 43
- Live albums: 1
- Compilation albums: 14
- Singles: 46
- Music videos: 35
- No.1 Single: 17 US 23 Overall

The Oak Ridge Boys are an American musical group. Originally a gospel quartet, The Oak Ridge Boys switched their focus to secular music in the 1970s, releasing a string of hit albums and singles that lasted into the early 1990s. In addition to product from their gospel years, their modern-era discography comprises 43 studio album releases and 46 charted singles (plus several hits in tandem with other acts). Their highest-selling album is 1981's Fancy Free, certified double-platinum by the Recording Industry Association of America (RIAA).

Of The Oak Ridge Boys' singles, seventeen reached Number One on the Billboard country singles charts. Two of these songs, "Elvira" and "Bobbie Sue", were also Top 40 pop and Adult Contemporary hits, and the former is certified platinum as a single. Four additional singles ("Sail Away", "Dream On", "Heart of Mine", and "Fancy Free") were also hits on the AC chart, while "I'll Be True to You", "Cryin' Again", "Heart of Mine", "Fancy Free", "So Fine", and "American Made" made the pop chart.

== Studio albums ==
=== 1950s and 1960s ===
Title	Album details
The Oak Ridge Quartet	Release date: 1958; Label: Cadence Records; Formats: LP
Sing and Shout	Release date: 1959; Label: Skylite Records; Formats: LP
The Oak Ridge Quartet	Release date: 1959; Label: Checker Records; Formats: LP
Master Showmen of Song	Release date: 1960; Label: Starday Records; Formats: LP
Go Out to the Program	Release date: 1960; Label: Skylite; Formats: LP
You'll Never Walk Alone	Release date: 1961; Label: Skylite; Formats: LP
He Whispers Sweet Peace to Me	Release date: 1962; Label: Skylite; Formats: LP
With Sounds of Nashville	Release date: 1962; Label: Warner Bros. Records; Formats: LP
Folk Minded Spirituals for Spiritual Minded Folk	Release date: 1963; Label: Warner Bros. Records; Formats: LP
Together (with The Harvesters)	Release date: 1964; Label: Festival Records; Formats: LP
Sing for You	Release date: 1964; Label: Skylite Records; Formats: LP
Singing the Gospel	Release date: 1964; Label: Stateswood Records; Formats: LP
I Wouldn't Take Nothing for My Journey Now	Release date: 1964; Label: Skylite Records; Formats: LP
The Sensational Oak Ridge Boys from Nashville Tennessee	Release date: 1965; Label: Starday Records; Formats: LP
The Solid Gospel Sound of the Oak Ridge Quartet	Release date: 1965; Label: Skylite Records; Formats: LP
River of Life	Release date: 1966; Label: Skylite Records; Formats: LP
Sing Serve Life (with Smitty Gatlin)	Release date: 1966; Label: Skylite Records; Formats: LP
Songs We Wish We'd Recorded First	Release date: 1966; Label: Heart Warming Records; Formats: LP
Duane Allen Out Front	Release date: 1967; Label: Heart Warming Records; Formats: LP
At Their Best	Release date: 1967; Label: United Artists Records; Formats: LP
A Great Day	Release date: 1967; Label: Heart Warming Records; Formats: LP
New Horizons	Release date: 1968; Label: Heart Warming Records; Formats: LP
It's Happening!	Release date: 1969; Label: Heart Warming Records; Formats: LP
Thanks	Release date: 1969; Label: Heart Warming Records; Formats: LP

=== 1970s ===
Title	Album details	Peak chart positions			Certifications (sales threshold)
Title	Album details	US Country	US	CAN Country	Certifications (sales threshold)
Talk About the Good Times	Release date: 1970; Label: Heart Warming Records; Formats: LP	—	—	—	
International	Release date: 1970; Label: Heart Warming Records; Formats: LP	—	—	—	
Jesus Christ, What a Man!	Release date: 1971; Label: Heart Warming Records; Formats: LP	—	—	—	
Performance	Release date: 1971; Label: Heart Warming Records; Formats: LP	—	—	—	
Light	Release date: 1972; Label: Heart Warming Records; Formats: LP	—	—	—	
Street Gospel	Release date: 1973; Label: Heart Warming Records; Formats: LP, 8-track	—	—	—	
The Lighthouse & Other Gospel Hits	Release date: 1973; Label: Vista Records; Formats: LP, 8-track	—	—	—	
Hymns	Release date: 1973; Label: Orb Records; Formats: LP, 8-track	—	—	—	
The Oak Ridge Boys	Release date: 1974; Label: Columbia Records; Formats: LP, 8-track	38	—	—	
Sky High	Release date: 1975; Label: Columbia Records; Formats: LP, 8-track	—	—	—	
Old Fashioned, Down Home, Hand Clappin', Foot Stompin', Southern Style, Gospel Quartet Music	Release date: 1976; Label: Columbia Records; Formats: LP, 8-track	—	—	—	
Live	Release date: 1977; Label: Rockland Road Records; Formats: LP, 8-track	—	—	—	
Y'all Come Back Saloon	Release date: September 2, 1977; Label: Dot Records; Formats: LP, 8-track	8	120	—	* US: Gold
Room Service	Release date: May 25, 1978; Label: ABC Records; Formats: LP, 8-track	3	164	2	* US: Gold
The Oak Ridge Boys Have Arrived	Release date: March 30, 1979; Label: ABC Records; Formats: LP, 8-track	5	—	1	* US: Gold
"—" denotes releases that did not chart

=== 1980s ===
Title	Album details	Peak chart positions				Certifications (sales threshold)
Title	Album details	US Country	US	CAN Country	CAN	Certifications (sales threshold)
Together	Release date: March 30, 1980; Label: MCA Records; Formats: LP, cassette, 8 Track	10	154	1	—	* US: Gold
Fancy Free	Release date: March 26, 1981; Label: MCA Records; Formats: LP, cassette, 8 Track	1	14	—	46	CAN: Platinum; US: 2× Platinum
Bobbie Sue	Release date: February 10, 1982; Label: MCA Records; Formats: LP, cassette, 8 Track	1	20	—	27	CAN: Gold; US: Gold
American Made	Release date: January 20, 1983; Label: MCA Records; Formats: LP, cassette, CD, 8 Track	2	51	—	—	US: Gold
Deliver	Release date: October 20, 1983; Label: MCA Records; Formats: LP, cassette, CD, 8 Track	1	121	—	—	US: Gold
Step On Out	Release date: March 6, 1985; Label: MCA Records; Formats: LP, cassette, CD, 8 Track	3	156	—	—	
Seasons	Release date: March 25, 1986; Label: MCA Records; Formats: LP, cassette, CD, 8 Track	8	—	—	—	
Where the Fast Lane Ends	Release date: February 10, 1987; Label: MCA Records; Formats: LP, cassette, CD, 8 Track	14	—	—	—	
Heartbeat	Release date: September 30, 1987; Label: MCA Records; Formats: LP, cassette, CD, 8 Track	20	—	—	—	
Monongahela	Release date: August 10, 1988; Label: MCA Records; Formats: LP, cassette, CD, 8 Track	9	—	—	—	
American Dreams	Release date: August 30, 1989; Label: MCA Records; Formats: LP, cassette, CD	24	—	—	—	
"—" denotes releases that did not chart

=== 1990s ===
Title	Album details	Peak positions
Title	Album details	US Country
Unstoppable	Release date: April 9, 1991; Label: RCA Records; Formats: CD, cassette	41
The Long Haul	Release date: June 23, 1992; Label: RCA Records; Formats: CD, cassette	—
Revival	Release date: 1997; Label: Halsey Records; Formats: CD, cassette	—
Voices	Release date: July 27, 1999; Label: Intersound Records; Formats: CD, cassette	—
"—" denotes releases that did not chart

=== 2000s ===
Title	Album details	Peak chart positions		
Title	Album details	US Country	US	US Christ
From the Heart	Release date: May 22, 2001; Label: Spring Hill Records; Formats: CD, cassette	49	—	—
Colors	Release date: May 20, 2003; Label: Spring Hill Records; Formats: CD	53	—	—
The Journey	Release date: July 27, 2004; Label: Spring Hill Records; Formats: CD, music download	—	—	—
Common Thread	Release date: May 24, 2005; Label: Spring Hill Records; Formats: CD, music download	—	—	—
Front Row Seats	Release date: September 26, 2006; Label: Spring Hill Records; Formats: CD, music download	—	—	—
A Gospel Journey	Release date: April 21, 2009; Label: Gaither Music; Formats: CD, DVD, music download	28	156	14
The Boys Are Back	Release date: May 19, 2009; Label: Spring Hill Records; Formats: CD, music download	16	77	4
"—" denotes releases that did not chart

=== 2010s and 2020s ===
Title	Album details	Peak chart positions			
Title	Album details	US Country	US	US Indie	US Christ
It's Only Natural	Release date: September 19, 2011; Label: Cracker Barrel Music; Formats: CD	16	70	11	—
Back Home Again: Gospel Favorites	Release date: May 22, 2012; Label: Gaither Music Group; Formats: CD, music download	29	—	—	11
Rock of Ages, Hymns and Gospel Favorites	Release date: May 26, 2015; Label: Gaither Music Group; Formats: CD, music download	26	—	—	8
17th Avenue Revival	Release date: March 16, 2018; Label: Lightning Rod Records; Formats: CD, digital download, LP	44	—	10	—
Front Porch Singin'	Release date: June 11, 2021; Label: Lightning Rod Records; Formats: CD, digital download, LP	—	—	—	—
Mama's Boys	Release date: October 25, 2024; Label: Lightning Rod Records; Formats: CD, LP, digital download	—	—	—	—

== Compilation albums ==
Title	Album details	Peak chart positions			Certifications / Sales
Title	Album details	US Country	US	CAN Country	Certifications / Sales
The Sensational Oak Ridge Boys	Release date: 1975; Label: Gusto Records; Formats: LP, 8-track	—	—	—	
The Best of The Oak Ridge Boys	Release date: 1978; Label: Columbia Records; Formats: LP, 8-track, cassette	22	—	—	
Sing for Him	Release date: 1979; Label: Columbia Records; Formats: LP, 8-track	—	—	—	
Greatest Hits	Release date: October 30, 1980; Label: MCA Records; Formats: LP, 8-track, cassette	5	99	13	CAN: Gold; US: Platinum
Greatest Hits 2	Release date: July 7, 1984; Label: MCA Records; Formats: CD, LP, cassette	2	71	—	US: Platinum
American Harmony	Release date: 1985; Label: Heartland; Formats: CD, LP, cassette	—	—	—	
Greatest Hits 3	Release date: April 28, 1989; Label: MCA Records; Formats: CD, LP, cassette	22	—	—	
The Oak Ridge Boys Collection	Release date: April 21, 1992; Label: MCA Records; Formats: CD, cassette	—	—	—	US: Gold
The Best of The Oak Ridge Boys	Release date: June 22, 1993; Label: RCA Records; Formats: CD, cassette	—	—	—	
20th Century Masters: The Millennium Collection	Release date: August 15, 2000; Label: MCA Records; Formats: CD, cassette	—	—	—	US: 523,500
The Definitive Collection	Release date: August 15, 2006; Label: MCA Records; Formats: CD, music download	—	—	—	
Gold	Release date: January 30, 2007; Label: MCA Records; Formats: CD, music download	—	—	—	
40th Anniversary: 1973–2013	Release date: July 30, 2013; Label: Gaither Music Group; Formats: CD, music download	38	—	—	
"—" denotes releases that did not chart

== Holiday albums ==
Title	Album details	Peak chart positions				Certifications/ Sales
Title	Album details	US Country	US	US Indie	US Christ	Certifications/ Sales
Christmas	Release date: September 23, 1982; Label: MCA Records; Formats: LP, cassette	9	73	—	—	US: Gold
Christmas Again	Release date: September 20, 1986; Label: MCA Records; Formats: LP, cassette	50	—	—	—	
Country Christmas Eve	Release date: September 26, 1995; Label: Capitol Records; Formats: CD, cassette	—	—	—	—	
An Inconvenient Christmas	Release date: October 15, 2002; Label: Spring Hill Records; Formats: CD	58	—	27	—	
Christmas Cookies	Release date: October 11, 2005; Label: Spring Hill Records; Formats: CD, music download	73	—	—	—	
Christmas Time's A-Coming	Release date: September 25, 2012; Label: Gaither Music Group; Formats: CD, music download	50	—	—	40	
Celebrate Christmas	Release date: October 21, 2016; Label: Gaither Music Group; Formats: CD, music download	43	—	—	34	
Down Home Christmas	Release date: October 25, 2019; Label: Lightning Rod Records; Formats: CD, music download, LP	—	—	32	—	
"—" denotes releases that did not chart

== Live albums ==
Title	Album details
Boys Night Out	Release date: April 15, 2014; Label: Cleopatra Records; Formats: CD, vinyl, music download

== Singles ==
=== 1970s ===
Year	Single	Peak chart positions						Album
Year	Single	US Country	US	US AC	CAN Country	CAN AC	AUS	Album
1972	"The Flowers Kissed the Shoes That Jesus Wore"	—	—	—	—	—	—	Light
1973	"The Baptism of Jesse Taylor"	—	—	—	—	—	—	The Oak Ridge Boys
1974	"He's Gonna Smile on Me"	—	—	—	—	—	—	The Oak Ridge Boys
1974	"Loves Me Like a Rock"	—	—	—	—	—	—	The Oak Ridge Boys
1975	"Rhythm Guitar"	—	—	—	—	—	—	Sky High
1975	"Heaven Bound"	—	—	—	—	—	—	The Best of the Oak Ridge Boys
1976	"Where the Soul Never Dies"	—	—	—	—	—	—	Old Fashioned, Down Home, Hand Clappin', Foot Stompin', Southern Style, Gospel Quartet Music
1976	"Family Reunion"	83	—	—	—	—	—	The Best of the Oak Ridge Boys
1976	"Whoever Finds This, I Love You"	—	—	—	—	—	—	—N/a
1977	"Y'all Come Back Saloon"	3	—	—	2	—	—	Y'all Come Back Saloon
1977	"You're the One"	2	—	—	1	—	—	Y'all Come Back Saloon
1978	"I'll Be True to You"	1	102	—	8	—	—	Y'all Come Back Saloon
1978	"Easy"	—	—	—	—	—	28	Y'all Come Back Saloon
1978	"Cryin' Again"	3	107	—	1	—	—	Room Service
1978	"Come On In"	3	—	—	3	—	—	Room Service
1979	"Sail Away"	2	—	29	1	8	94	The Oak Ridge Boys Have Arrived
1979	"Dream On"	7	—	45	1	23	—	The Oak Ridge Boys Have Arrived
1979	"Leaving Louisiana in the Broad Daylight"	1	—	—	1	—	—	The Oak Ridge Boys Have Arrived
"—" denotes releases that did not chart

=== 1980s ===
Year	Single	Peak chart positions								Certifications (sales threshold)	Album
Year	Single	US Country	US	US AC	CAN Country	CAN	CAN AC	AUS	NZ	Certifications (sales threshold)	Album
1980	"Trying to Love Two Women"	1	—	—	1	—	—	—	—		Together
1980	"Heart of Mine"	3	105	49	3	—	—	—	—		Together
1980	"Beautiful You"	3	—	—	27	—	—	—	—		Together
1981	"Elvira"	1	5	8	1	26	13	87	13	US: Platinum	Fancy Free
1981	"(I'm Settin') Fancy Free"	1	104	17	2	—	—	—	—		Fancy Free
1982	"Bobbie Sue"	1	12	19	1	20	1	—	—	* US: Gold	Bobbie Sue
1982	"So Fine"	22	76	—	16	—	—	—	—		Bobbie Sue
1982	"I Wish You Could Have Turned My Head (And Left My Heart Alone)"	2	—	—	4	—	—	—	—		Bobbie Sue
1983	"American Made"	1	72	—	12	—	—	—	—		American Made
1983	"Love Song"	1	—	—	1	—	—	—	—		American Made
1983	"Ozark Mountain Jubilee"	5	—	—	1	—	—	—	—		Deliver
1984	"I Guess It Never Hurts to Hurt Sometimes"	1	—	—	1	—	—	—	31		Deliver
1984	"Everyday"	1	—	—	1	—	—	—	—		Greatest Hits Volume 2
1984	"Make My Life with You"	1	—	—	1	—	—	—	—		Greatest Hits Volume 2
1985	"Little Things"	1	—	—	1	—	—	—	—		Step On Out
1985	"Touch a Hand, Make a Friend"	1	—	—	1	—	—	—	—		Step On Out
1986	"Come On In (You Did the Best You Could Do)"	3	—	—	1	—	—	—	—		Step On Out
1986	"Juliet"	15	—	—	16	—	—	—	—		Seasons
1986	"You Made a Rock of a Rolling Stone"	24	—	—	20	—	—	—	—		Seasons
1987	"It Takes a Little Rain (To Make Love Grow)"	1	—	—	1	—	—	—	—		Where the Fast Lane Ends
1987	"This Crazy Love"	1	—	—	2	—	—	—	—		Where the Fast Lane Ends
1987	"Time In"	17	—	—	35	—	—	—	—		Heartbeat
1988	"True Heart"	5	—	—	21	—	—	—	—		Heartbeat
1988	"Gonna Take a Lot of River"	1	—	—	1	—	—	—	—		Monongahela
1988	"Bridges and Walls"	10	—	—	10	—	—	—	—		Monongahela
1989	"Beyond Those Years"	7	—	—	10	—	—	—	—		Monongahela
1989	"An American Family"	4	—	—	32	—	—	—	—		American Dreams
1989	"No Matter How High"	1	—	—	1	—	—	—	—		American Dreams
"—" denotes releases that did not chart

=== 1990s ===
Year	Single	Peak chart positions		Album
Year	Single	US Country	CAN Country	Album
1990	"Baby, You'll Be My Baby"	71	34	American Dreams
1990	"(You're My) Soul and Inspiration"	31	25	My Heroes Have Always Been Cowboys (soundtrack)
1991	"Lucky Moon"	6	2	Unstoppable
1991	"Change My Mind"	70	—	Unstoppable
1991	"Baby on Board"	44	63	Unstoppable
1992	"Fall"	69	88	The Long Haul
1999	"Baby When Your Heart Breaks Down"	—	—	Voices
1999	"Ain't No Short Way Home"	71	—	Voices
"—" denotes releases that did not chart

=== 2000s ===
Year	Single	Album
2001	"Write Your Name Across My Heart"	From the Heart
2003	"Colors"	Colors
2003	"Glory Bound"	Colors
2004	"Bad Case of Missing You"	The Journey
2005	"Someplace Green"	The Journey
2006	"It's Hard to Be Cool (In a Minivan)"	Front Row Seats
2007	"Closer to Home"	Front Row Seats
2007	"Did I Make a Difference"	Front Row Seats
2009	"Seven Nation Army"	The Boys Are Back
2009	"Mama's Table"	The Boys Are Back
2011	"Whatcha Gonna Do"	It's Only Natural
2015	"Sweet Jesus" with Merle Haggard	Rock of Ages, Hymns and Gospel Favorites
2018	"Brand New Star"	17th Avenue Revival
2018	"Pray to Jesus"	17th Avenue Revival
2019	"Reindeer on the Roof"	Down Home Christmas
2019	"Don't Go Pulling on Santa Claus' Beard"	Down Home Christmas
2020	"Amazing Grace"	Down Home Christmas
2021	"Love, Light & Healing"	Front Porch Singin'
2021	"Life is Beautiful"	Front Porch Singin'
2024	"I Thought of You, Lord" (with Willie Nelson)	Mama's Boys
2025	"Come On Home"	Mama's Boys

== Other singles ==
=== Christmas singles ===
Year	Single	Peak chart positions		Album
Year	Single	US Country	CAN Country	Album
1982	"Thank God for Kids"	3	24	Christmas
1982	"Christmas Is Paintin' the Town"	—	—	Christmas
2002	"The Most Inconvenient Christmas"	—	—	An Inconvenient Christmas
2005	"Ordinary Days"	—	—	Christmas Cookies
"—" denotes releases that did not chart

=== Featured singles ===
Year	Single	Artist(s)	Peak chart positions									Certifications	Album
Year	Single	Artist(s)	US Country	US	US AC	CAN Country	CAN	CAN AC	AUS	UK	FR	Certifications	Album
1973	"Praise the Lord and Pass the Soup"	Johnny Cash (with Carter Family)	57	—	—	65	—	—	—	—	—		Gold
1977	"Slip Slidin' Away"	Paul Simon (feat. The Oak Ridge Boys on backing vocals)	—	5	4	—	3	23	35	36	15	*US: Gold*	Greatest Hits, Etc.
1980	"Broken Trust"	Brenda Lee	9	—	—	14	—	—	—	—	—		Take Me Back
1982	"Oh Girl"	Con Hunley (feat. The Oak Ridge Boys on background vocals)	12	—	—	26	—	—	—	—	—		Oh Girl
1982	"You Make Me Want to Sing"	Joe Sun	85	—	—	—	—	—	—	—	—		The Best
1982	"Just for the Moment"	Brenda Lee (feat. The Oak Ridge Boys)	78	—	—	—	—	—	—	—	—		Love Letters
1982	"Same Ole Me"	George Jones	5	—	—	1	—	—	—	—	—		Still the Same Ole Me
1986	"When You Get to the Heart"	Barbara Mandrell	20	—	—	33	—	—	—	—	—		Get to the Heart

=== Promotional singles ===
Year	Single	Peak chart positions		Album
Year	Single	US Country	CAN Country	Album
1979	"Rhythm Guitar" (re-release)	94	72	The Best of The Oak Ridge Boys
1986	"There's A New Kid In Town"	—	—	Christmas Again
1987	"Take Pride in America"	—	—	Greatest Hits, Volume Three
"—" denotes releases that did not chart

== Music videos ==
Year	Title	Director
1977	"Easy"	
1982	"So Fine"	Sherman Halsey
1982	"Thank God For Kids"	Kenny Meyers
1983	"Love Song"	Paul Henman
1983	"Ozark Mountain Jubilee" (Live)	Mark Dice
1984	"I Guess It Never Hurts to Hurt Sometimes"	Dominic Orlando
1984	"Everyday"	Ken Walz
1985	"Little Things"	Patricia Birch
1986	"Juliet"	Scott Hello/Martha Holmes
1987	"Take Pride in America"	Dick Heard
1988	"Gonna Take a Lot of River"	Larry Boothby/Ken Walz
1989	"Beyond Those Years"	Larry Boothby
1989	"No Matter How High"	Larry Boothby
1991	"(You're My) Soul and Inspiration"	Dean Lent
1991	"Change My Mind"	Larry Boothby
1992	"Fall"	Wayne Miller
1999	"Ain't No Short Way Home"	Tom Bevins
2001	"Write Your Name Across My Heart"	Eric Welch
2002	"Winter Wonderland"	Sherman Halsey
2002	"The Most Inconvenient Christmas"	Sherman Halsey
2004	"Someplace Green"	Sherman Halsey
2006	"Hard to Be Cool (In a Minivan)"	Steven L. Weaver
2009	"Mama's Table"	
2011	"What'cha Gonna Do"	Sherman Halsey
2012	"Sacrifice For Me"	
2015	"Elvira" (with Home Free)	
2017	"Family Bible" (With Bradley Walker (singer))	
2018	"Brand New Star"	Brandon Wood
2018	"Pray To Jesus"	Brandon Wood
2019	"Reindeer on the Roof"	Brandon Wood
2019	"Elvira" (with Buck 22)	
2019	"Amazing Grace"	Brandon Wood
2021	"Love, Light, and Healing"	
2024	"Elvira"	Brandon Wood
2025	"Come on Home"	
