= Greatest Hits 3 (The Oak Ridge Boys album) =

Greatest hits album by The Oak Ridge Boys
- Released: April 28, 1989
- Genre: Country
- Length: 33:21
- Label: MCA
- Producer: Jimmy Bowen, Ron Chancey

The Oak Ridge Boys chronology
Monongahela (1988)	Greatest Hits 3 (1989)	American Dreams (1989)

Professional ratings
Review scores
Source	Rating
Allmusic	4.5/5 stars

Greatest Hits 3 is a compilation album by The Oak Ridge Boys. It was released in 1989 via MCA Records. The album peaked at number 22 on the Billboard Top Country Albums chart.

Although Steve Sanders is on the cover of the album, several tracks include William Lee Golden, most notably "Touch A Hand, Make A Friend," which has a lead vocal by Golden.

== Track listing ==
No.	Title	Writer(s)	Length
1.	"Gonna Take a Lot of River"	Mark Henley, John Kurhajetz	3:00
2.	"^True Heart"	Michael Clark, Don Schlitz	3:07
3.	"Little Things"	Billy Barber	3:24
4.	"This Crazy Love"	James Dean Hicks, Roger Murrah	3:02
5.	"Come On In (You Did the Best You Could Do)"	Rick Giles, George Green	3:28
6.	"Bobbie Sue"	Wood Newton, Adele Tyler, Dan Tyler, Jerry Lieber, Mike Stoller	2:50
7.	"It Takes a Little Rain (To Make Love Grow)"	Steve Dean, James Dean Hicks, Roger Murrah	3:56
8.	"Touch a Hand, Make a Friend"	Homer Banks, Carl Hampton, Raymond Jackson	3:28
9.	"Bridges and Walls"	Roger Murrah, Randy VanWarmer	3:52
10.	"^^Take Pride in America"	David Bracken, Clyde Otis	3:14

^The vocals on "True Heart" were re-recorded to match the live rendition more closely. This alternate version is exclusive to this album and has not been included on other releases.

^^Originally a promotional single and video in 1987.

== Chart performance ==
Chart (1989)	Peak position
U.S. Billboard Top Country Albums	22
