= Steve Sanders (musician) =

American musician, singer and songwriter.(1952–1998)

- Also known as: Little Steve Sanders, "Singin'"
- Born: Steve Sanders; September 17, 1952; Richland, Georgia, US
- Died: June 10, 1998 (aged 45) Cape Coral, Florida, US
- Genres: Country, gospel
- Occupations: Musician, actor
- Instruments: Guitar, piano, mandolin, banjo, vocals
- Years active: 1957–1995
- Formerly of: The Oak Ridge Boys

Steve Sanders (September 17, 1952 – June 10, 1998) was an American musician, singer, and songwriter. After playing rhythm guitar in the Oaks Band for several years, Sanders replaced William Lee Golden in the Oak Ridge Boys in 1987.

== Career ==
Sanders began singing gospel music at the age of five. By the age of six, he was the sole support for his family. His father played piano, and "Little Stevie" would sing, mostly at church appearances. Although he lacked formal education — Sanders did not graduate high school — he was a natural on stage.

In addition to appearing on Broadway in The Yearling at the age of 12, he was recruited by Otto Preminger in 1967 for the film Hurry Sundown with Michael Caine and Jane Fonda. He also made appearances on Gunsmoke. The Oak Ridge Boys, also a gospel act at the time, used to open for Little Stevie Sanders.

Upon turning 18, he learned his father had squandered all of his money. Disillusioned and broke, Sanders headed to London, founded Pyramid, and was known to jam with the local scene, including Mylon LeFevre and 10 Years After. Upon his return to the United States, Sanders provided vocals at Muscle Shoals and for Bang Records.

Sanders signed with the Oak Ridge Boys publishing companies in 1981, and wrote "Live in Love", the B side to the Oaks' crossover smash Bobbie Sue. He made his debut with their band the following year as rhythm guitarist (and occasional singer). He replaced William Lee Golden as the group's baritone from 1987 to 1995. In that position, Sanders was featured on several hits, including the Grammy-nominated "Gonna Take a Lot of River", "Bridges and Walls", "Beyond Those Years", "Lucky Moon", and their last number one record, "No Matter How High".

== Personal life ==
Born in Richland, Georgia, on September 17, 1952, to Herbert and Lorraine Sanders, he was the oldest of four children (siblings David and Debra, and stepbrother Noah from Herbert's second marriage).

Sanders met his first wife Mary Milbourn at Bang Records. Twelve years after their divorce, he married Janet Riggins. The two met backstage at Bally's Las Vegas, where the Oak Ridge Boys were performing, and Riggins was a dancer.

On June 10, 1998, Sanders was found dead in his bathroom from a self-inflicted gunshot to the head. His death was ruled a suicide.

In 2015, the Oak Ridge Boys were inducted into the Country Music Hall of Fame. Sanders was not included.

== Discography ==
=== Solo ===
- 1966: A Young Boy's Prayer (MGM Records)
- 1968: I'm Happy Now (Canaan Records)
- 1969: Little Steve Sings Big (Canaan Records)
- 1969: This Is My Valley (Canaan Records)
- 1970: In the Springtime of His Years (Canaan Records)
- 1971: Now (Canaan Records)
- 1974: Pyramid (Bang)

=== With The Oak Ridge Boys ===
- 1987: Heartbeat
- 1988: Monongahela
- 1989: American Dreams
- 1989: Greatest Hits 3 (compilation)
- 1991: Unstoppable
- 1992: The Long Haul
- 1993: The Best of the Oak Ridge Boys
- 1995: Country Christmas Eve
- 2018: When I Sing for Him

==== Singles he was featured on ====
- 1988: "Gonna Take a Lot of River"
- 1988: "Bridges and Walls"
- 1989: "Beyond Those Years"
- 1990: "No Matter How High"
- 1990: "Baby, You'll Be My Baby"
- 1991: "Lucky Moon"
- 1991: "Change My Mind"
- 1995: "Blue Christmas"
