= Greatest Hits 2 (The Oak Ridge Boys album) =

Greatest hits album by The Oak Ridge Boys
- Released: July 7, 1984
- Genre: Country
- Length: 36:20
- Label: MCA
- Producer: Ron Chancey

The Oak Ridge Boys chronology
Deliver (1983)	Greatest Hits 2 (1984)	Step On Out (1985)

Singles from Greatest Hits 2
- 1. "Everyday" Released: July 14, 1984; 2. "Make My Life With You" Released: November 10, 1984

Greatest Hits 2 is a compilation album featuring most of the Oak Ridge Boys' hits from 1981 to 1984. It was released on July 7, 1984. Unlike the first Greatest Hits, released in 1980, this album had two new songs, "Make My Life with You" and "Everyday", which became hits.

== Track listing ==
1. "Elvira" (Dallas Frazier) (3:40) From the album Fancy Free
2. "Ozark Mountain Jubilee" (Roger Murrah/Scott Anders) (3:14) From the album Deliver
3. "Love Song" (Steve Runkle) (3:51) From the album American Made
4. "(I'm Settin') Fancy Free" (Jimbeau Hinson/Don August) (3:36) From the album Fancy Free
5. "Everyday" (Dave Loggins/J.D. Martin) (3:54) New song, previously unreleased
6. "Beautiful You" (Dave Hanner) (4:07) From the album Together
7. "Thank God for Kids" (Eddy Raven) (2:29) From the album Christmas
8. "American Made" (Bob DiPiero/Pat McManus) (2:39) from the album American Made
9. "Make My Life with You" (Gary Burr) (3:55) New song, previously unreleased
10. "I Guess It Never Hurts to Hurt Sometimes" (Randy VanWarmer) (3:58) From the album Deliver

== Charts ==
=== Weekly charts ===
Chart (1984)	Peak position
US Billboard 200	71
US Top Country Albums (Billboard)	2

=== Year-end charts ===
Chart (1985)	Position
US Top Country Albums (Billboard)	10

=== Singles ===
Year	Single	Peak positions	
Year	Single	US Country	CAN Country
1984	"Everyday"	1	1
1984	"Make My Life with You"	1	1
