= Common Thread (The Oak Ridge Boys album) =

Studio album by The Oak Ridge Boys
- Released: May 24, 2005
- Genre: Country, Gospel
- Label: Spring Hill Music Group; Word Records

The Oak Ridge Boys chronology
The Journey (2004)	Common Thread (2005)	Front Row Seats (2006)

Common Thread is a studio album released by The Oak Ridge Boys on May 24, 2005.

== Track listing ==
1. "Jesus Is Coming Soon" (R.E. Winsett) - 2:42 *
2. "He Did It All for Me" (Duane Allen, Powell Sager) - 2:42 #
3. "You Can't Fix It" (Chaz Bosarge, Neil Johnson, Phil Johnson) - 3:54 #
4. "I Know" (Morrey Burns, Lois Mann, Ervin T. Rouse, Laverne Tripp) - 3:08 #
5. "The Journey" (Joe Bonsall) - 5:29 ^
6. "How Great Thou Art" (Stuart K. Hine) - 3:02 *
7. "This Little Light of Mine" (Traditional) - 4:40 *
8. "You Don't Have to Go Home (But You Can't Stay Here)" (Larry Cordle, Jerry Salley, Larry Shell) - 3:09 ^
9. "Amazing Grace" (John Newton) - 3:08 *
10. "I Saw the Light" (Hank Williams) - 3:13 *
11. "Keep Our World Safe" (Norah Lee Allen) - 3:25 #
12. "God Will Take Care of You" - 3:31 *

== Production ==
Common Thread is a collection of songs from various sources:

- Six of the songs (*) were originally released in 2004 as part of a special edition of From The Heart, available through Feed The Children.
- Two of the songs (^) were originally released in 2004 on The Journey.
- The remaining four tracks (#) were recorded for this album
