= It's Only Natural (The Oak Ridge Boys album) =

Studio album by The Oak Ridge Boys
- Released: September 19, 2011
- Genre: Country
- Label: Cracker Barrel Music
- Producer: Michael Sykes, Duane Allen, Ron Chancey

The Oak Ridge Boys chronology
The Boys Are Back (2009)	It's Only Natural (2011)	Mama's Boys (2024)

It's Only Natural is an album by the Oak Ridge Boys. It was released September 19, 2011, by the music division of the Cracker Barrel Old Country Store restaurant chain. The album contains five new songs and newly re-recorded versions of six older Oak Ridge Boys songs. Also included is a re-recording of "Louisiana Red Dirt Highway", which William Lee Golden originally released in 1990 during his hiatus from the group.

== Critical reception ==
Giving it three stars out of five, Billy Dukes of Taste of Country thought that some of the songs were "sleepy", but praised "What'cha Gonna Do?" and "The Shade". A four-star review came from Bobby Peacock of Roughstock, who thought that its new songs were mostly well-suited to the group, and praised the re-recordings for their arrangements.

== Track listing ==
No.	Title	Writer(s)	Length
1.	"What'cha Gonna Do?^{†}"	Steven J. Williams, Wil Nance, Sherrié Austin	2:38
2.	"True Heart"	Michael Clark, Don Schlitz	3:57
3.	"Before I Die^{†}"	Woody Mullis, Trey Matthews	3:53
4.	"Gonna Take a Lot of River"	Mark Henley, John Kurhajetz	4:28
5.	"No Matter How High"	Even Stevens, Joey Scarbury	3:12
6.	"The Shade^{†}"	Shane Decker, Troy Jones	3:34
7.	"Elvira"	Dallas Frazier	3:41
8.	"Louisiana Red Dirt Highway"	Vernon Rust	4:28
9.	"Beyond Those Years"	Troy Seals, Eddie Sester	4:43
10.	"Wish You Could Have Been There^{†}"	Steven Dall, Casey Marshall, John Kennedy	3:46
11.	"Lucky Moon"	Mark Wright, Doug Johnson	3:24
12.	"Sacrifice… for Me^{†}"	Joe Bonsall	4:21

Songs marked with a † indicate new songs recorded for this album.

== Charts ==
Chart (2011)	Peak position
U.S. Billboard 200	70
U.S. Billboard Top Country Albums	16
U.S. Billboard Independent Albums	11
