= Time In =

Time In may refer to:

- Time In (album), a 1966 jazz album by the Dave Brubeck Quartet, and a track from that album
- "Time In" (song), a 1987 song by The Oak Ridge Boys
