= Windy City (album) =

- Cover of the album's standard edition

Studio album by Alison Krauss
- Released: February 17, 2017
- Recorded: 2013, 2016
- Studio: Big Gassed (Nashville, Tennessee); Blackbird (Nashville, Tennessee); Budro Music Repair Shop (Nashville, Tennessee); Grand Victor (Nashville, Tennessee); Ocean Way (Nashville, Tennessee); Sound Emporium (Nashville, Tennessee); Sound Stage (Nashville, Tennessee); The Doghouse (Nashville, Tennessee)
- Genre: Country, Nashville sound
- Length: 34:14
- Label: Capitol
- Producer: Buddy Cannon

Alison Krauss chronology
| Paper Airplane (2011) | Windy City (2017) | Arcadia (2025) |

Windy City is the fourth solo studio album by bluegrass-country artist Alison Krauss. Released on February 17, 2017, the album is Krauss' first solo release since Forget About It in 1999, and includes ten covers of classic songs that she selected with producer Buddy Cannon.

The deluxe edition adds four live versions of tracks. The Target Exclusive version adds two more tracks to the deluxe edition. The Cracker Barrel Exclusive version adds one more track to the regular edition. The Barnes & Noble Exclusive vinyl LP version has an alternate cover image.

== Critical reception ==
Professional ratings
Aggregate scores
| Source | Rating |
|---|---|
| Metacritic | 69/100 |
Review scores
| Source | Rating |
| AllMusic | 4/5 stars |
| Consequence of Sound | B |
| Entertainment Weekly | A− |
| Exclaim! | 8/10 |
| Uncut | 3/5 stars |

Windy City received generally positive reviews from music critics. At Metacritic, which assigns a normalized rating out of 100 to reviews from mainstream critics, the album has an average score of 69 based on 10 reviews, indicating "generally favorable reviews".

Mark Deming of AllMusic rated the album four out of five stars and calls it "a richly satisfying experience." Writing for Entertainment Weekly, Madison Vain rated the album an A− and states Windy City "enforces Krauss' legacy as one of American music's standout talents."

== Commercial performance ==
Windy City debuted at number one on both the country and Americana charts in the US and UK, as well as number nine on the all-genre Billboard 200 with 38,000 album-equivalent units, of which 36,000 were pure album sales. As of March 2018 the album has sold 128,800 copies in the United States.

== Track listing ==
Windy City
| No. | Title | Writer(s) | Original artist(s) | Length |
|---|---|---|---|---|
| 1. | "Losing You" | Pierre Havet, Jean Renard, Carl Sigman | Brenda Lee | 2:55 |
| 2. | "It's Goodbye and So Long to You" | Raymond Couture, Harold J. Breau | The Osborne Brothers and Mac Wiseman | 3:11 |
| 3. | "Windy City" | Bobby Osborne, Pete Goble | The Osborne Brothers | 3:15 |
| 4. | "I Never Cared for You" | Willie Nelson | Willie Nelson | 2:45 |
| 5. | "River in the Rain" | Roger Miller | Roger Miller | 3:52 |
| 6. | "Dream of Me" | Jimmy Darrell, Raleigh Squires, Buddy Cannon | Oak Ridge Boys (Vern Gosdin's subsequent cover was the hit version) | 4:03 |
| 7. | "Gentle on My Mind" | John Hartford | John Hartford (Glen Campbell's subsequent cover was the hit version) | 3:34 |
| 8. | "All Alone Am I" | Manos Hadjidakis, Arthur Altman | Brenda Lee | 3:26 |
| 9. | "Poison Love" | Elmer Laird | Johnnie & Jack | 2:55 |
| 10. | "You Don't Know Me" | Cindy Walker, Eddy Arnold | Eddy Arnold | 4:18 |
| Total length: | | | | 34:14 |

Deluxe edition bonus tracks
| No. | Title | Length |
|---|---|---|
| 11. | "Windy City" (live) | 3:18 |
| 12. | "River in the Rain" (live) | 4:21 |
| 13. | "Losing You" (live) | 2:52 |
| 14. | "I Never Cared for You" (live) | 2:53 |
| Total length: | | 47:38 |

Target bonus tracks
| No. | Title | Length |
|---|---|---|
| 15. | "Till I Gain Control Again" | 5:21 |
| 16. | "Angel Flying Too Close to the Ground" | 4:31 |
| Total length: | | 57:29 |

Cracker Barrel bonus track
| No. | Title | Length |
|---|---|---|
| 11. | "Make the World Go Away" (with Jamey Johnson) | 3:05 |
| Total length: | | 37:19 |

== Personnel ==
- Alison Krauss - vocals, fiddle
- Barry Bales - bass
- Richard Bennett - bass, acoustic guitar, electric guitar, Tic Tac
- Ron Block - gut string guitar
- Buddy Cannon - background vocals
- Melonie Cannon - background vocals
- Sidney Cox - background vocals
- Suzanne Cox - background vocals
- Chad Cromwell - drums
- Scott Ducaj - trumpet
- Teddy Gentry - background vocals
- John Hobbs - Hammond B3, piano
- Jim Horn - saxophone
- Jamey Johnson - background vocals
- Mike Johnson - lap steel guitar
- Kenny Malone - percussion
- Brent Mason - acoustic guitar, electric guitar
- Joe Murphy - tuba
- Matt Rollings - piano
- Charles Rose - trombone
- Jeff Taylor - accordion
- Bobby Terry - acoustic guitar
- Dan Tyminski - background vocals
- Tommy White - lap steel guitar
- Hank Williams, Jr. - background vocals

Strings

- Monisa Angell
- Zach Casebolt
- Seanad Chang
- Janet Darnall
- David Davidson
- Conni Ellisor
- Jim Grosjean
- Ali Hoffman
- Anthony LaMarchina
- Carole Rabinowitz
- Sari Reist
- Julia Tanner
- Wei Tsun Chang
- Mary Kathryn Van Osdale
- Vanosdale
- Katelyn Westergard
- Kristin Wilkinson
- Karen Winkelmann

== Charts ==
=== Weekly charts ===
| Chart (2017) | Peak position |
|---|---|
| Australian Albums (ARIA) | 70 |
| Australia Country Albums (ARIA) | 9 |
| Belgian Albums (Ultratop Flanders) | 126 |
| Canadian Albums (Billboard) | 35 |
| Dutch Albums (Album Top 100) | 46 |
| German Albums (Offizielle Top 100) | 66 |
| Irish Albums (IRMA) | 17 |
| New Zealand Albums (RMNZ) | 40 |
| Norwegian Albums (VG-lista) | 18 |
| Scottish Albums (OCC) | 3 |
| Swedish Albums (Sverigetopplistan) | 29 |
| Swiss Albums (Schweizer Hitparade) | 72 |
| Taiwanese Albums (Five Music) | 8 |
| UK Albums (OCC) | 6 |
| UK Country Albums (OCC) | 1 |
| US Billboard 200 | 9 |
| US Top Bluegrass Albums (Billboard) | 1 |
| US Top Country Albums (Billboard) | 1 |
| US Americana/Folk Albums (Billboard) | 1 |

=== Year-end charts ===
| Chart (2017) | Position |
|---|---|
| US Top Country Albums (Billboard) | 49 |
| US Folk Albums (Billboard) | 17 |

== Release history ==
| Region | Date | Format(s) | Label | Ref. |
|---|---|---|---|---|
| United States | February 17, 2017 | CD; Digital download; LP | Capitol | |
| United Kingdom | March 3, 2017 | CD; Digital download | Decca | |
