= The Boys Are Back =

The Boys Are Back may refer to:

== Film and television ==
- The Boys Are Back (film), a 2009 Australian movie
- The Boys Are Back (TV series), a 1994–1995 American sitcom

== Music ==
- The Boys Are Back (The Oak Ridge Boys album) or the title song, 2009
- The Boys Are Back (Sawyer Brown album), 1989
- "The Boys Are Back", a song from the film High School Musical 3: Senior Year, 2008
- "The Boys Are Back", a song by Dropkick Murphys from Signed and Sealed in Blood, 2013

== See also ==
- The Boys Are Back in Town (disambiguation)
