= 1st GMA Dove Awards =

1969 US music awards ceremony

- Date: September 1969
- Location: Memphis, Tennessee

The 1st Annual GMA Dove Awards were held in September 1969 during the National Quartet Convention in Memphis, Tennessee.

== Award winners ==
- Song of the Year
  - "Jesus Is Coming Soon"; R. E. Winsett; R. E. Winsett Music (SESAC)
- Songwriter of the Year
  - Bill Gaither
- Male Vocalist of the Year
  - James Blackwood
- Female Vocalist of the Year
  - Vestal Goodman
- Male Group of the Year
  - The Imperials
- Mixed Group of the Year
  - The Speer Family
- Album of the Year
  - "It's Happening"; Oak Ridge Boys; Bob MacKenzie; Heart Warming
- Instrumentalist
  - Dwayne Friend
- Album Jacket
  - "It's Happening"; Oak Ridge Boys; Heart Warming
- Television Program
  - Gospel Jubilee, Florida Boys
- D.J. of the Year
  - J. G. Whitfield
