= Seasons (The Oak Ridge Boys album) =

Studio album by The Oak Ridge Boys
- Released: March 25, 1986
- Genre: Country
- Length: 42:14
- Label: MCA
- Producer: Ron Chancey

The Oak Ridge Boys chronology
Step On Out (1985)	Seasons (1986)	Where the Fast Lane Ends (1987)

Singles from Seasons
- 1. "Juliet" Released: March 22, 1986; 2. "You Made a Rock of a Rolling Stone" Released: July 12, 1986

Seasons is the twelfth album by The Oak Ridge Boys, released via MCA Records in 1986. The album features the singles "Juliet" and "You Made a Rock of a Rolling Stone", which were both hits on Hot Country Songs.

== Track listing ==
No.	Title	Writer(s)	Length
1.	"Seasons"	Jimbeau Hinson, Jack Williams	4:47
2.	"What Are You Doing in My Dream"	Steve Diamond, Bill LaBounty	4:06
3.	"Bedtime"	Charlie Black, Austin Roberts	3:56
4.	"Hidin' Place"	Ray Stevens	3:21
5.	"Don't Break the Code"	John Hall, Johanna Hall	4:49
6.	"Juliet"	John Hall, Larry Hoppen	3:19
7.	"You Made a Rock of a Rolling Stone"	Kix Brooks, Chris Waters	3:48
8.	"Take a Step (Yesterday Waltz)"	Bill LaBounty, Jay Senter	4:14
9.	"What You Do to Me"	John Hall, Johanna Hall	4:06
10.	"Everybody Wins"	Duane Allen, Jimbeau Hinson, Jack Williams	5:28

== Personnel ==
=== The Oak Ridge Boys ===
- Duane Allen - lead
- Joe Bonsall - tenor
- William Lee Golden - baritone
- Richard Sterban - bass

=== Additional musicians ===
- Acoustic Guitar: Billy Sanford
- Bass guitar: David Hood, Jack Williams
- Drums: Roger Hawkins, James Stroud
- Electric guitar: Jimmy Johnson, Brent Rowan, Billy Sanford
- Fiddle: Mark O'Connor
- Harmonica: Terry McMillan
- Keyboards: Steve Nathan
- Mandolin: Billy Sanford
- Piano: David Briggs, Ron Oates
- Saxophone: Jim Horn, Denis Solee, Harvey Thompson
- Saxophone Solos: Jim Horn
- Strings: The Nashville String Machine
- String Arranger: Bergen White
- Synthesizer: Steve Nathan
- Trombone: Dennis Goode, Charles Rose
- Trumpet: Harrison Calloway Jr., George Tidwell

== Chart performance ==
Chart (1986)	Peak position
U.S. Billboard Top Country Albums	8
