= The Boys Are Back (The Oak Ridge Boys album) =

Studio album by The Oak Ridge Boys
- Released: May 19, 2009
- Genre: Country
- Label: Spring Hill Music Group
- Producer: Duane Allen, Dave Cobb

The Oak Ridge Boys chronology
A Gospel Journey (2009)	The Boys Are Back (2009)	It's Only Natural (2011)

The Boys Are Back is the 23rd frontline album by The Oak Ridge Boys. It was released in 2009 under the Spring Hill Music Group label. The album marked the group's return to pop music after a series of holiday, country, and gospel albums. "Seven Nation Army," a cover of The White Stripes song, was the first single.

"Beautiful Bluebird" was written and originally recorded by Neil Young for his 1985 album Old Ways, but was not released until Chrome Dreams II in 2007. "Boom Boom" was written and recorded by John Lee Hooker and is listed as one of the Rock and Roll Hall of Fame's 500 Songs that Shaped Rock and Roll.

== Background ==
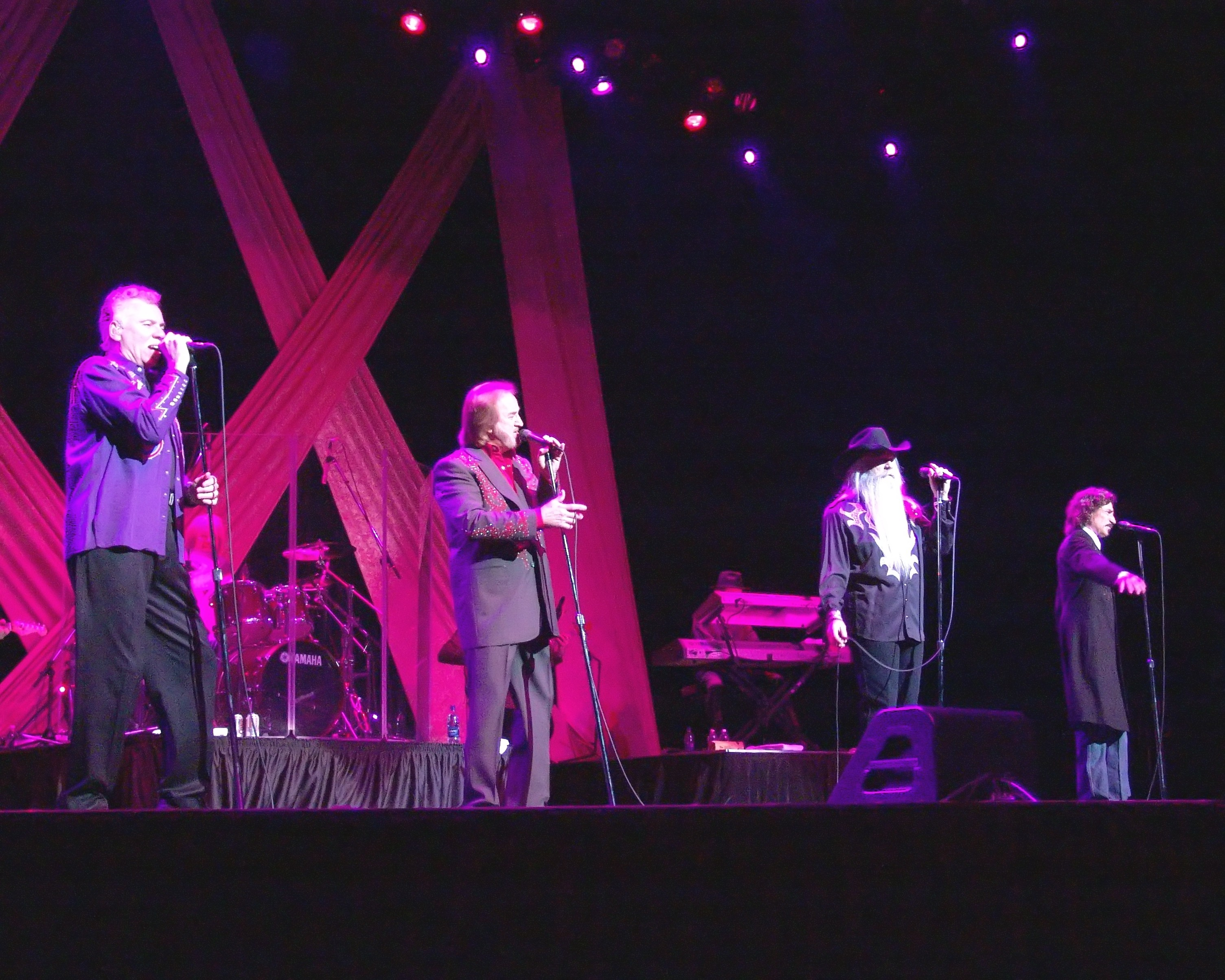
The Oak Ridge Boys performing in 2007

Shooter Jennings, son of Waylon Jennings, asked the Oak Ridge Boys to collaborate on The Wolf. Jennings introduced them to Dave Cobb and invited them to a performance. After being surprised at the reaction of the youth-dominated crowd to "Elvira", Cobb took the Oaks to a studio to experiment with different sounds.

The album was recorded in a studio formerly used by Waylon Jennings, next door to what had once been the Oak Ridge Boys' office. According to Allen, the album took two weeks to record, with sessions every day until midnight or after.

When asked about the album's content, bass singer Richard Sterban commented, "If there's something I could compare this to, it would be what Johnny Cash did in the later part of his career."

== Reception ==
The record reached #16 on the country album charts, the band's highest ranking since their 1988 album Monongahela. The album also stood at #77 on the Billboard 200, the group's first top 100 activity and highest ranking on the chart since the 1983 album American Made. American Dreams Allmusic gave the album a mixed review. While giving the album three out of five stars, the critic described the group as "overcompensating greatly." The title track was said to be "repetitive." "Seven Nation Army" received the most criticism, for missing "the mark by a mile" and showing "little understanding" of the song. "Boom Boom" also received negative marks from allmusic, who thought that Richard Sterban sounded like a "randy Mr. Ed." The reviewer also described the album as a "fitfully entertaining comeback."

The Times Record News gave the album a B, lauding the vocals on the title track as "rich" and "unique." The publication cited the tracks "Mama’s Table," "Troublin’ Mind," "Live With Jesus" and "Hold Me Closely" (featuring Jessi Colter) as the standouts of the record.

== Track listing ==
No.	Title	Writer(s)	Length
1.	"The Boys Are Back"	Shooter Jennings	3:37
2.	"Hold Me Closely"	Brent Cobb	3:28
3.	"Hold You in My Arms"	Ethan Johns, Ray LaMontagne	5:28
4.	"Seven Nation Army"	Jack White	3:54
5.	"Mama's Table"	Jamey Johnson, George Teren	3:28
6.	"Boom Boom"	John Lee Hooker	3:15
7.	"You Ain't Gonna Blow My House Down"	Glenn Ashworth, Dallas Frazier	4:10
8.	"Beautiful Bluebird"	Neil Young	3:46
9.	"God's Gonna Ease My Troublin' Mind"	Traditional	3:16
10.	"Live with Jesus"	Paul Kennerley	3:16

== Chart ==
Chart (2009)	Peak position
U.S. Top Country Albums	16
U.S. Billboard 200	77

=== Singles ===
Year	Song	US Country
2009	"Seven Nation Army"	-
2009	"Mama's Table"	
