= American Family =

American Family may refer to:

- American Family (artwork exhibition), by Renée Cox
- American Family (2002 TV series), a PBS drama starring Edward James Olmos and Constance Marie
- An American Family, a 1973 documentary broadcast on PBS
- "An American Family" (song), by The Oak Ridge Boys
- "An American Family" (Brothers & Sisters episode)
- "An American Family", an episode of Cheers
- The Beach Boys: An American Family, a television biopic of the Beach Boys
- Aflac Incorporated (American Family Life Assurance Company)
- American Family Insurance

== See also ==
- American family structure
