= A Gospel Journey =

Greatest hits album by The Oak Ridge Boys
- Released: April 21, 2009
- Genre: Country, gospel
- Label: Gaither Music Group
- Producer: Bill Gaither (DVD), Duane Allen (Music)

The Oak Ridge Boys chronology
Front Row Seats (2006)	A Gospel Journey (2009)	The Boys Are Back (2009)

Professional ratings
Review scores
Source	Rating
Allmusic	link

A Gospel Journey is a live DVD released by the country/gospel group The Oak Ridge Boys consisting of live performance of various gospel-themed songs from their recording catalog over the years, as well as historical footage and interviews with the group. A CD containing the musical performances was also produced. Both were released on April 21, 2009.

== Track listing ==
1. "Jesus Is Coming Soon" (R. E. Winsett, Winsett) – 2:19
2. "I Know" (Burns, Mann, Rouse, Rouse, Tripp) – 3:27
3. "Didn't It Rain" (Emerson, Emerson) – 4:01
4. "Thank God for Kids" (Raven) – 2:57
5. "Elvira" (Frazier) – 3:31
6. "The Baptism of Jesse Taylor" (Frazier, Schafer, Shafer) – 4:08
7. "Jesus Is the Man (For the Hour)" (Hall) – 2:19
8. "Because He Lives" (Gaither, Gaither) – 3:42
9. "Did I Make a Difference" (Anderson, Crosby) – 3:42
10. "Jonah, Job and Moses" (Anderson, Sillers, Sillers) – 4:06
11. "An American Family" (Corbin) – 3:56
12. "Closer to Home" (Tirro, Wood) – 3:31
13. "Live with Jesus" (Kennerley) – 3:18
14. "Loving God, Loving Each Other" (Gaither, Gaither) – 3:15
15. "Where the Soul Never Dies" (Golden) – 2:55
16. "Just a Little Talk with Jesus" (Derricks) – 2:12

== Awards ==
A Gospel Journey won a Dove Award for Long Form Music Video of the Year at the 41st GMA Dove Awards.

== Chart performance ==
Chart (2009)	Peak position
U.S. Billboard Top Country Albums	28
U.S. Billboard 200	156
U.S. Billboard Christian Albums	14
