= Dream of Me =

Dream of Me may refer to:

- "Dream of Me" (The Oak Ridge Boys song), 1981; covered by Vern Gosdin (1981) and Alison Krauss (2017)
- "Dream of Me" (Orchestral Manoeuvres in the Dark song), 1993
- "Dream of Me", a song from the Get Over It soundtrack
- "Dream of Me", a song by Anggun from the album Snow on the Sahara
- "Dream of Me", a song by Kristina Train from the album Dark Black
- "Dream of Me", a song by the Kalin Twins
- "Dream of Me", a song by NewDad from the album Madra
