= No Matter How High =

Single by The Oak Ridge Boys

from the album American Dreams
- B-side: "Bed of Roses"
- Released: December 1989
- Genre: Country
- Length: 2:55
- Label: MCA
- Songwriters: Joey Scarbury; Even Stevens
- Producer: Jimmy Bowen

The Oak Ridge Boys singles chronology
"An American Family" (1989)	"No Matter How High" (1989)	"Baby, You'll Be My Baby" (1990)

"No Matter How High" is a song written by Even Stevens and Joey Scarbury, and recorded by The Oak Ridge Boys, featuring Steve Sanders on lead vocals. It was released in December 1989 as the second single from American Dreams. It was their seventeenth and final number one on the country chart. The single went to number one for one week and spent a total of twenty-one weeks on the country chart.

== Music video ==
Although the lyrics describe a romantic partner, the music video features the Oaks in their respective hometowns with their mothers.

== Chart performance ==
Chart (1989–1990)	Peak position
Canada Country Singles (RPM)	1
US Hot Country Songs (Billboard)	1

=== Year-end charts ===
Chart (1990)	Position
Canada Country Tracks (RPM)	14
US Country Songs (Billboard)	7

== Remake ==
In 2011, the group rerecorded the song with a new arrangement and Duane Allen on lead vocals for It's Only Natural.
