= Step On Out =

Studio album by The Oak Ridge Boys
- Released: March 6, 1985
- Genre: Country
- Length: 33:17
- Label: MCA
- Producer: Ron Chancey

The Oak Ridge Boys chronology
Greatest Hits 2 (1984)	Step On Out (1985)	Seasons (1986)

Singles from Step On Out
- 1. "Little Things" Released: March 30, 1985; 2. "Touch a Hand, Make a Friend" Released: August 3, 1985; 3. "Come On In (You Did the Best You Could Do)" Released: November 23, 1985

Step On Out is the eleventh album by The Oak Ridge Boys, released in 1985. It contains the #1 singles "Touch a Hand (Make a Friend)" and "Little Things", as well as the #3 "Come On In (You Did the Best You Could Do)". The title song was co-written by Rock & Roll Hall of Fame member and former Byrds bass player Chris Hillman.

== Critical reception ==
A review in Billboard praised "Ophelia" and "Little Things" as the most interesting songs, while also making note of Chancey's production and the vocal harmonies.

== Track listing ==
No.	Title	Writer(s)	Length
1.	"Touch a Hand, Make a Friend"	Homer Banks, Raymond Jackson, Carl Hampton	3:28
2.	"Ophelia"	Robbie Robertson	3:04
3.	"Love Is Everywhere"	Dennis Linde	3:26
4.	"Only One I Love"	Michael Foster, Jimbeau Hinson	2:50
5.	"Roll Tennessee River"	Russell Smith, Dave Loggins	3:38
6.	"Little Things"	Billy Barber	3:24
7.	"Class Reunion"	Craig Morris, Don Henry	4:22
8.	"Staying Afloat"	J. D. Martin, Don King	2:48
9.	"Come On In (You Did the Best You Could Do)"	Rick Giles, George Green	3:31
10.	"Step On Out"	Chris Hillman, Peter Knobler	3:12

== Singles ==
- Little Things / Secret Of Love - 1985 - MCA 52556
- Come On In (You Did The Best You Could Do) / Roll Tennessee River - 1985 - MCA 52646
- Touch A Hand Make A Friend / Only One I Love - 1985 - MCA 57272

== Personnel ==
=== The Oak Ridge Boys ===
- Joe Bonsall - tenor
- Duane Allen - lead
- William Lee Golden - baritone
- Richard Sterban - bass

=== Additional musicians ===
- Barry Beckett - keyboards
- Mickey Buckins - percussion
- Harrison Calloway - horns
- Duncan Cameron - electric guitar, acoustic guitar
- Jimmy Capps - acoustic guitar
- Jerry Carrigan - drums
- Ronnie Eades - horns
- Lloyd Green - steel guitar
- Roger Hawkins - drums
- David Hood - bass guitar
- Jim Horn - horns
- Clayton Ivey - keyboards
- Jimmy Johnson - electric guitar
- Kenneth Lovelace - fiddle
- Nashville String Machine - string section
- Steve Nathan - keyboards
- Ron Oates - keyboards
- Wayne Perkins - electric guitar
- Charles Rose - horns
- Brent Rowan - electric guitar
- Billy Sanford - electric guitar, acoustic guitar
- Dennis Solee - horns
- Harvey Thompson - horns
- Jack Williams - bass guitar
- Reggie Young - electric guitar

== Charts ==
=== Weekly charts ===
Chart (1985)	Peak position
US Billboard 200	156
US Top Country Albums (Billboard)	3

=== Year-end charts ===
Chart (1985)	Position
US Top Country Albums (Billboard)	17
