= You Made a Rock of a Rolling Stone =

Single by The Oak Ridge Boys

from the album Seasons
- B-side: "Hidin' Place"
- Released: July 12, 1986
- Genre: Country
- Length: 3:49
- Label: MCA
- Songwriters: Kix Brooks, Chris Waters
- Producer: Ron Chancey

The Oak Ridge Boys singles chronology
| "When You Get to the Heart" (1986) | "You Made a Rock of a Rolling Stone" (1986) | "It Takes a Little Rain (To Make Love Grow)" (1987) |

"You Made a Rock of a Rolling Stone" is a song written by Kix Brooks and Chris Waters, and recorded by The Oak Ridge Boys. It was released in July 1986 as the second single from Seasons. The song reached No. 24 on the Billboard Hot Country Singles & Tracks chart.

== Chart performance ==
| Chart (1986) | Peak position |
|---|---|
| US Hot Country Songs (Billboard) | 24 |
| Canadian RPM Country Tracks | 20 |
