= The Boys Are Back in Town (disambiguation) =

"The Boys Are Back in Town" is a 1976 song by Thin Lizzy.

The Boys Are Back in Town may also refer to:

== Music ==
=== Albums ===
- The Boys Are Back in Town: Live in Australia, a live album by Thin Lizzy, recorded in 1978 and released in 1999

=== Songs ===
- "The Boys Are Back in Town," a song by American funk band The Gap Band from their 1979 album The Gap Band II
- "(The Boys Are) Back in Town," a song by American rock group The BusBoys featured in the 1982 film 48 Hrs.
- "The Boys Are Back in Town," a song performed by American country music singer Patty Loveless on her 2001 album Mountain Soul
- "The Boys Are Back in Town," a song by American rapper Yung Gravy from his 2019 album Sensational

== Other uses ==
- "The Boys Are Back in Town", episode in the 1998's cartoon The Powerpuff Girls
- The Boys Are Back in Town, 2005 television series episode, see list of Entourage episodes
- The Boys Are Back in Town, 2001 memoir by Simon Carr, on which the film The Boys Are Back (2009) was based

== See also ==
- The Boys Are Back (disambiguation)
