= Juliet (The Oak Ridge Boys song) =

1986 single by The Oak Ridge Boys

Single by The Oak Ridge Boys

from the album Seasons
- B-side: "Everybody Wins"
- Released: March 22, 1986
- Genre: Country
- Length: 3:30
- Label: MCA
- Songwriters: John Hall, Larry Hoppen
- Producer: Ron Chancey

The Oak Ridge Boys singles chronology
"Come On In (You Did the Best You Could Do)" (1985)	"Juliet" (1986)	"When You Get to the Heart" (1986)

"Juliet" is a song written by John Hall and Larry Hoppen, and recorded by The Oak Ridge Boys. It was released in March 1986 as the first single from Seasons. The song reached number 16 on the Billboard Hot Country Singles & Tracks chart.

== Music video ==
The music video features a Mardi Gras theme and stars actress Robin Christopher.

== Chart performance ==
Chart (1986)	Peak position
US Hot Country Songs (Billboard)	15
Canadian RPM Country Tracks	16
