= Time In (song) =

Single by The Oak Ridge Boys

from the album Heartbeat
- B-side: "A Little Coal on the Fire"
- Released: October 10, 1987
- Genre: Country
- Length: 3:37
- Label: MCA
- Songwriters: Rich Alves, Roger Murrah, James Dean Hicks
- Producer: Jimmy Bowen

The Oak Ridge Boys singles chronology
"This Crazy Love" (1987)	"Time In" (1987)	"True Heart" (1988)

"Time In" is a song written by Rich Alves, Roger Murrah, and James Dean Hicks, and recorded by The Oak Ridge Boys. It was released in October 1987 as the first single from Heartbeat. The song reached number 17 on the Billboard Hot Country Singles and Tracks chart.

== Chart performance ==
Chart (1987)	Peak position
US Hot Country Songs (Billboard)	17
Canadian RPM Country Tracks	35
