= (I'm Settin') Fancy Free =

Single by The Oak Ridge Boys

from the album Fancy Free
- B-side: ""How Long Has It Been"
- Released: August 1981 (U.S.)
- Recorded: 1981
- Genre: Country
- Length: 3:49
- Label: MCA
- Songwriters: Roy August, Jimbeau Hinson
- Producer: Ron Chancey

The Oak Ridge Boys singles chronology
"Elvira" (1981)	"(I'm Settin') Fancy Free" (1981)	"Bobbie Sue" (1982)

"(I'm Settin') Fancy Free" (also known as Fancy Free) is a song written by Roy August and Jimbeau Hinson, and recorded by The Oak Ridge Boys as the title song for Fancy Free. It was released in August 1981 as the second single from the album. It reached No. 1 on the Billboard Hot Country Singles chart in November 1981, and also crossed over to the pop charts.

== Charts ==
Chart (1981)	Peak position
US Hot Country Songs (Billboard)	1
US Bubbling Under Hot 100 (Billboard)	4
US Adult Contemporary (Billboard)	17
Canadian RPM Country Tracks	2
