= The Journey (The Oak Ridge Boys album) =

Studio album by The Oak Ridge Boys
- Released: July 27, 2004
- Genre: Country, Gospel
- Label: Spring Hill Music Group; Word Records

The Oak Ridge Boys chronology
Colors (2003)	The Journey (2004)	Common Thread (2005)

Professional ratings
Review scores
Source	Rating
Allmusic	(?)

The Journey is the 21st album by The Oak Ridge Boys. The album was released on July 27, 2004 on Spring Hill.

== Track listing ==
1. "Train, Train" (Benny Boling, Dusty Drake, Jerry VanDiver) - 2:44
2. "Someplace Green" (Pat Terry) - 4:00
3. "Bad Case of Missing You" (Al Anderson, Bob DiPiero, Jeffrey Steele) - 4:04
4. "Saving Grace" (Jerry Salley, Charles Wilburn) - 4:35
5. "You Don't Have to Go Home (But You Can't Stay Here)" (Larry Cordle, Jerry Salley, Larry Shell) - 3:10
6. "Old Familiar Love" (Tom Fisch, Roy Hurtd) - 3:41
7. "Goin' Against the Grain" (Bruce Bouton, Larry Cordle, Carl Jackson) - 2:33
8. "I Love You So Much It Hurts" (Floyd Tillman) - 3:06
9. "My Girl Friday" (Carl Jackson, Curtis Wright) - 3:40
10. "That Ole Gravel Road Was Easy Street" (Billy Lawson, Roger Murrah) - 3:26
11. "The Journey" (Joe Bonsall) - 5:27

== Awards ==
In 2004, The Journey was nominated for a Dove Award for Country Album of the Year at the 36th GMA Dove Awards.
