= Heartbeat (The Oak Ridge Boys album) =

Studio album by The Oak Ridge Boys
- Released: September 30, 1987
- Recorded: 1987
- Genre: Country
- Length: 33:38
- Label: MCA
- Producer: Jimmy Bowen

The Oak Ridge Boys chronology
Where the Fast Lane Ends (1987)	Heartbeat (1987)	Monongahela (1988)

Singles from Heartbeat
- 1. "Time In" Released: October 10, 1987; 2. "True Heart" Released: February 27, 1988

Heartbeat is the fourteenth album by The Oak Ridge Boys, and their first with Steve Sanders, who replaced William Lee Golden. The album includes the hit singles "Time In" and "True Heart". The album reached number 20 on Top Country Albums.

"Love Without Mercy" was later a top 10 hit for Lee Roy Parnell.

== Track listing ==
No.	Title	Writer(s)	Length
1.	"Come by Here"	Paul Kelly	3:59
2.	"All I Need"	Steve Bogard, Rick Giles	3:27
3.	"Don't Turn Around"	Gary Burr	3:36
4.	"A Little More Coal on the Fire"	Dave Loggins	3:03
5.	"Love Without Mercy"	Mike Reid, Don Pfrimmer	3:10
6.	"Hear My Heart Beat"	Jim Casey, Danny Mayo	3:00
7.	"Time In"	Rich Alves, Roger Murrah, James Dean Hicks	3:37
8.	"One Love, One You"	Lisa Palas, Mark D. Sanders	3:02
9.	"New Way Out"	Randy Sharp	2:49
10.	"True Heart"	Michael Clark, Don Schlitz	3:55

== Personnel ==
=== The Oak Ridge Boys ===
- Duane Allen - lead
- Joe Bonsall - tenor
- Steve Sanders - baritone
- Richard Sterban - bass

=== Musicians ===
- John Barlow Jarvis - DX-7, piano
- Russ Kunkel - drums, percussion
- Mike Lawler - drum programming, synthesizer
- Leland Sklar - bass guitar
- Billy Joe Walker Jr. - acoustic guitar
- Reggie Young - electric guitar

== Chart performance ==
Chart (1987)	Peak position
U.S. Billboard Top Country Albums	20
