= Lucky Moon =

Single by The Oak Ridge Boys

from the album Unstoppable
- B-side: "Walkin' After Midnight"
- Released: March 23, 1991
- Genre: Country
- Length: 3:26
- Label: RCA
- Songwriters: Doug Johnson, Mark Wright
- Producer: Richard Landis

The Oak Ridge Boys singles chronology
"(You're My) Soul and Inspiration" (1990)	"Lucky Moon" (1991)	"Change My Mind" (1991)

"Lucky Moon" is a song written by Doug Johnson and Mark Wright and recorded by American country music group The Oak Ridge Boys, featuring Steve Sanders. It was released in March 1991 as the first single from the album Unstoppable. The song reached No. 6 on the Billboard Hot Country Singles & Tracks chart. It was the group's last Top 10 hit.

== Critical reception ==
Edward Morris wrote in a column for Billboard that "Besides being a catchy, sing-along tune, it's also one that unleashes the Oaks' rich, buoyant vocal harmonies. The lads haven't sounded this fresh in ages."

== Other versions ==
In 2011, the group rerecorded the song with a new arrangement and bass singer Richard Sterban on lead vocals for It's Only Natural.

== Chart performance ==
Chart (1991)	Peak position
Canada Country Singles (RPM)	2
US Hot Country Songs (Billboard)	6

=== Year-end charts ===
Chart (1991)	Position
Canada Country Tracks (RPM)	37
US Country Songs (Billboard)	56
