= Beyond Those Years =

Single by The Oak Ridge Boys

from the album Monongahela
- B-side: "Too Many Heartaches"
- Released: April 1, 1989
- Genre: Country
- Length: 4:37
- Label: MCA
- Songwriters: Troy Seals, Eddie Setser
- Producer: Jimmy Bowen

The Oak Ridge Boys singles chronology
"Bridges and Walls" (1989)	"Beyond Those Years" (1989)	"An American Family" (1989)

"Beyond Those Years" is a song written by Troy Seals and Eddie Setser, and recorded by The Oak Ridge Boys, featuring Steve Sanders. It was released in April 1989 as the third single from Monongahela. It reached #7 on the Billboard Hot Country Singles & Tracks chart.

In 2011, the group re-recorded the song with a new arrangement and Joe Bonsall on lead vocals for It's Only Natural.

== Chart performance ==
Chart (1989)	Peak position
Canada Country Singles (RPM)	10
US Hot Country Songs (Billboard)	7

=== Year-end charts ===
Chart (1989)	Position
US Country Songs (Billboard)	85
