= Dream of Me (The Oak Ridge Boys song) =

Single by Vern Gosdin

from the album Today My World Slipped Away
- B-side: "Ain't It Been Love"
- Released: May 16, 1981
- Genre: Country
- Length: 2:47
- Label: Ovation
- Songwriter(s): Jimmy Darrell, Raleigh Squires, Buddy Cannon
- Producer(s): Blake Mevis

Vern Gosdin singles chronology
"Too Long Gone" (1981)	"Dream of Me" (1981)	"Don't Ever Leave Me Again" (1982)

"Dream of Me" is a song written by Jimmy Darrell, Raleigh Squires and Buddy Cannon, and recorded by American country music artist Vern Gosdin. It was released in May 1981 as the second single from the album Today My World Slipped Away. The song reached #7 on the Billboard Hot Country Singles & Tracks chart.

== Other versions ==
- The song was originally recorded by The Oak Ridge Boys on their 1981 album Fancy Free.

The song was covered by Alison Krauss on her 2017 solo album "Windy City," which was produced by one of the song's co-writers, Buddy Cannon.

== Chart performance ==
Chart (1981)	Peak position
US Hot Country Songs (Billboard)	7
