= Monongahela (album) =

Studio album by The Oak Ridge Boys
- Released: August 10, 1988
- Genre: Country
- Length: 35:49
- Label: MCA
- Producer: Jimmy Bowen

The Oak Ridge Boys chronology
Heartbeat (1987)	Monongahela (1988)	Greatest Hits 3 (1989)

Singles from Monongahela
- 1. "Gonna Take a Lot of River" Released: July 1988; 2. "Bridges and Walls" Released: December 3, 1988; 3. "Beyond Those Years" Released: April 1, 1989

Professional ratings
Review scores
Source	Rating
Allmusic	4.5/5 stars

Monongahela is the fifteenth album by The Oak Ridge Boys, released in 1988 via MCA Records. The album peaked at number 9 on the Billboard Top Country Albums chart.

The album includes three singles that charted on Hot Country Songs: "Gonna Take a Lot of River", which reached number 1, followed by "Bridges and Walls" at number 10 and "Beyond Those Years" at number 7.

== Track listing ==
No.	Title	Writer(s)	Length
1.	"Gonna Take a Lot of River"	Mark Henley, John Kurhajetz	3:00
2.	"I Can Count on You"	Roger Murrah, Randy VanWarmer	3:36
3.	"Never Together (But Close Sometimes)"	Rodney Crowell	2:20
4.	"No Way Out"	Steve Bogard, Rick Giles	3:16
5.	"Beyond Those Years"	Troy Seals, Eddie Setser	4:37
6.	"Private Lives"	Troy Seals, Mentor Williams	3:16
7.	"Too Many Heartaches"	Jerry G. Hludzik, Mark Wanko	2:57
8.	"Bridges and Walls"	Roger Murrah, Randy VanWarmer	3:52
9.	"When Karen Comes Around"	Dewayne Blackwell, Bobby Fischer, Earl Bud Lee, Robert Ellis Orrall	4:20
10.	"Taking One Heartbeat (At a Time)"	Walker Igleheart	4:35

== Personnel ==
=== The Oak Ridge Boys ===
- Duane Allen — lead
- Joe Bonsall — tenor
- Steve Sanders — baritone
- Richard Sterban — bass

=== Musicians ===
- Dewey Dorough — saxophone
- Bessyl Duhon — accordion
- John Barlow Jarvis — piano, synthesizer
- Wade Benson Landry — fiddle
- Mike Lawler — synthesizer
- Rick Marotta — drums
- Leland Sklar — bass guitar
- Billy Joe Walker Jr. — acoustic guitar, electric guitar
- Reggie Young — electric guitar

== Chart performance ==
Chart (1988)	Peak position
U.S. Billboard Top Country Albums	9
