= Where the Fast Lane Ends =

Studio album by The Oak Ridge Boys
- Released: February 10, 1987
- Genre: Country
- Label: MCA
- Producer: Jimmy Bowen

The Oak Ridge Boys chronology
Seasons (1986)	Where the Fast Lane Ends (1987)	Heartbeat (1987)

Singles from Seasons
- 1. "It Takes a Little Rain (To Make Love Grow)" Released: February 21, 1987; 2. "This Crazy Love" Released: June 13, 1987

Where the Fast Lane Ends is the thirteenth album by The Oak Ridge Boys, released via MCA Records in 1987. It features guest appearances by Joe Walsh and Patti LaBelle, and the hits "This Crazy Love" and "It Takes a Little Rain (To Make Love Grow)".

This was the group's last album to include William Lee Golden for ten years. It was also the group's first album produced by Jimmy Bowen, who replaced their longtime producer Ron Chancey.

People magazine's Ralph Novak and Mary Shaughnessy gave it a negative review, calling it "listless", and noted LaBelle's performance as the "highlight" of the album.

== Track listing ==
No.	Title	Writer(s)	Length
1.	"This Crazy Love"	Roger Murrah, James Dean Hicks	3:01
2.	"A Little Love Can Go a Long Way"	Even Stevens, Hillary Kanter	4:26
3.	"Whatever It Takes"	Alan Roy Scott, Arnie Roman	4:26
4.	"Love Has a Mind of Its Own"	Paul Williams	4:03
5.	"Is This Any Way for Us to Say Goodbye"	Shayne Dolan, Casey Kelly	3:52
6.	"Where the Fast Lane Ends"	Fred Koller, Sonny Throckmorton	4:28
7.	"It Takes a Little Rain (To Make Love Grow)"	Roger Murrah, James Dean Hicks, Steve Dean	3:55
8.	"Looking for Love"	Dave Murray	4:30
9.	"A Little Late to Say Goodbye"	Roger Murrah, John Schweers	3:12
10.	"Rainbow at Midnight" (featuring Patti LaBelle and Joe Walsh)	Danny Tate, Tom Kimmel	4:55

== Personnel ==
=== The Oak Ridge Boys ===
- Duane Allen - lead
- Joe Bonsall - tenor
- William Lee Golden - baritone
- Richard Sterban - bass

=== Additional musicians ===
- Richard Bennett - acoustic guitar
- Larry Byrom - electric guitar
- David Hungate - bass guitar
- John Barlow Jarvis - keyboards
- Russ Kunkel - drums, percussion
- Patti LaBelle - super vocals on "Rainbow at Midnight"
- Mat Morse - synclavier programming
- Skip SoRelle - synclavier programming
- Billy Joe Walker Jr. - electric guitar, synthesizer
- Joe Walsh - electric guitar and slide guitar on "Rainbow at Midnight"

== Chart performance ==
Chart (1987)	Peak position
U.S. Billboard Top Country Albums	14
