= True Heart (song) =

Single by The Oak Ridge Boys

from the album Heartbeat
- B-side: "Love Without Mercy"
- Released: February 27, 1988
- Genre: Country
- Length: 3:56
- Label: MCA
- Songwriters: Michael Clark, Don Schlitz
- Producer: Jimmy Bowen

The Oak Ridge Boys singles chronology
| "Time In" (1987) | "True Heart" (1988) | "Gonna Take a Lot of River" (1988) |

"True Heart" is a song written by Michael Clark and Don Schlitz, and recorded by the Oak Ridge Boys. It was released in February 1988 as the second single from Heartbeat. The song reached number five on the Billboard Hot Country Singles and Tracks chart.

The Oak Ridge Boys have recorded the song twice since its original release. They recorded a new vocal arrangement (using the original music track) for the single release, which also appeared on their Greatest Hits Volume Three compilation in 1989. The new vocal arrangement fades the song, removing the extended instrumental ending. In 2011, the group recorded an entirely new arrangement of the song on It's Only Natural.

== Charts ==
=== Weekly charts ===
| Chart (1988) | Peak position |
|---|---|
| US Hot Country Songs (Billboard) | 5 |
| Canadian RPM Country Tracks | 21 |

=== Year-end charts ===
| Chart (1988) | Position |
|---|---|
| US Hot Country Songs (Billboard) | 49 |
