= Come On In (You Did the Best You Could Do) =

Single by The Oak Ridge Boys

from the album Step On Out
- B-side: "Roll Tennessee River"
- Released: November 23, 1985
- Genre: Country
- Length: 3:30
- Label: MCA
- Songwriters: Rick Giles, George Green
- Producer: Ron Chancey

The Oak Ridge Boys singles chronology
"Touch a Hand, Make a Friend" (1985)	"Come On In (You Did the Best You Could Do)" (1985)	"Juliet" (1986)

"Come On In (You Did the Best You Could Do)" is a song written by Rick Giles and George Green, and recorded by The Oak Ridge Boys. It was released in November 1985 as the third single from Step On Out. The song reached number 3 on the Billboard Hot Country Singles & Tracks chart. The song was also covered by Oak Ridge Boys member William Lee Golden on his 1986 solo album American Vagabond.

== Chart performance ==
Chart (1985–1986)	Peak position
US Hot Country Songs (Billboard)	3
Canadian RPM Country Tracks	1
