= Jesus Is Coming Soon =

1942 gospel song composed by R. E. Winsett

"Jesus Is Coming Soon" is a 1942 gospel song composed by R. E. Winsett.

The song has become a Southern gospel standard, as evidenced by its recording history. It was awarded the title "Song of the Year" in 1969 at the 1st GMA Dove Awards.

== Lyrics ==
Verse 1:

Troublesome times are here, filling men's hearts with fear, Freedom we all hold dear, now is at stake, Humbling your heart to God, safe from the chast'ning rod, Seek the way pilgrim's trod, Christians awake!

Chorus:

Jesus is coming soon, morning or night or noon; Many will meet their doom, trumpets will sound, All of the dead shall rise, righteous meet in the skies, Going where no one dies, heavenward bound.

Verse 2: (not often included in recordings)

Love of so many cold; losing their home of gold; This in God's Word is told; evils abound.

When these signs come to pass, nearing the end at last, It will come very fast; trumpets will sound.

Verse 3:

Troubles will soon be o’er; happy forevermore, When we meet on that shore, free from all care.

Rising up in the sky, telling this world goodbye; Homeward we then will fly, glory to share.

== Recordings ==
The following are recordings by notable artists:

- The Sheltons – The first band to professionally record the song. Their arrangement of the song was recorded on Halo records "Heart Felt Gospel" in the late 60s, has been covered by numerous groups since.
- 1968 – The Inspirations
- 1969–79 – The Oak Ridge Boys
- 1991 The Lesters
