= Bridges and Walls =

Single by The Oak Ridge Boys

from the album Monongahela
- B-side: "Never Together (But Close Sometimes)"
- Released: December 3, 1988
- Genre: Country
- Length: 3:55
- Label: MCA
- Songwriters: Roger Murrah; Randy VanWarmer
- Producer: Jimmy Bowen

The Oak Ridge Boys singles chronology
"Gonna Take a Lot of River" (1988)	"Bridges and Walls" (1988)	"Beyond Those Years" (1989)

"Bridges and Walls" is a song written by Roger Murrah and Randy VanWarmer, and recorded by the Oak Ridge Boys. It was released in December 1988 as the second single from Monongahela. It reached number 10 on the Billboard Hot Country Singles and Tracks chart.

== Chart performance ==
Chart (1988–1989)	Peak position
US Hot Country Songs (Billboard)	10
