= Make My Life with You =

Single by The Oak Ridge Boys

from the album Greatest Hits 2
- B-side: "Break My Mind"
- Released: November 10, 1984
- Genre: Country
- Length: 4:05
- Label: MCA
- Songwriter: Gary Burr
- Producer: Ron Chancey

The Oak Ridge Boys singles chronology
"Everyday" (1984)	"Make My Life with You" (1984)	"Little Things" (1985)

"Make My Life with You" is a song written by Gary Burr and recorded by The Oak Ridge Boys. It was released in November 1984 as the second single from their Greatest Hits 2 compilation album. The song was The Oak Ridge Boys' eleventh number one on the country chart. The single stayed at number one for a week and spent a total of fourteen weeks on the chart.

== Charts ==
=== Weekly charts ===
Chart (1984–1985)	Peak position
US Hot Country Songs (Billboard)	1
Canadian RPM Country Tracks	1

=== Year-end charts ===
Chart (1985)	Position
US Hot Country Songs (Billboard)	31
