= Fancy Free (The Oak Ridge Boys album) =

1981 studio album by the Oak Ridge Boys

Studio album by the Oak Ridge Boys
- Released: March 26, 1981
- Studio: Woodland (Nashville, Tennessee)
- Genre: Country
- Length: 34:58
- Label: MCA
- Producer: Ron Chancey

The Oak Ridge Boys chronology
Greatest Hits (1980)	Fancy Free (1981)	Bobbie Sue (1982)

Singles from Fancy Free
- 1. "Elvira" Released: March 1981 (US); 2. "(I'm Settin') Fancy Free" Released: August 1981

Professional ratings
Review scores
Source	Rating
allmusic	4.5/5 stars

Fancy Free is the seventh album by the Oak Ridge Boys, released on March 26, 1981. It featured their biggest hit "Elvira", as well as the title track. "Somewhere in the Night" was covered by Sawyer Brown and "Dream Of Me" was covered by Vern Gosdin.

The album is certified double platinum by the RIAA. It also became the band's first album to reach number one on the Billboard Top Country Albums chart.

== Track listing ==
No.	Title	Writer(s)	Length
1.	"Elvira"	Dallas Frazier	3:40
2.	"Somewhere in the Night"	Don Cook, Rafe Van Hoy	3:30
3.	"She's Gone to L.A. Again""	Mickey Clark	3:00
4.	"When I'm With You"	Mitch Humphries, Jerry Michael	3:50
5.	"Another Dream Just Came True"	Don Schlitz	2:54
6.	"(I'm Settin') Fancy Free"	Roy August, Jimbeau Hinson	3:36
7.	"Dream of Me"	Buddy Cannon, Jimmy Darrell, Raleigh Squires	2:58
8.	"When Love Calls You"	Michael Foster	4:14
9.	"How Long Has It Been"	Foster, Marshall Morgan	3:42
10.	"I Would Crawl All the Way (To the River)"	Bucky Jones, Curly Putman, Dan Wilson	4:43

== Personnel ==
=== The Oak Ridge Boys ===
- Duane Allen, Joe Bonsall, William Lee Golden, Richard Sterban

=== The Band ===
- Drums, Percussion: Kenneth A. Buttrey, Jerry Carrigan, Hayward Bishop
- Bass: John C. Williams
- Acoustic & Electric Guitars: Barry Burton, James Capps, Chip Young, Billy Sanford, Reggie Young
- Steel: Weldon Myrick
- Keyboards: Ron Oates
- Banjo: Bobby Thompson
- Trumpet: Harrison Calloway, Jr.
- Trombone: Charles Rose
- Saxophone: Ronnie Eades, Harvey Thompson
- Oboe: Bobby G. Taylor
- Strings: John David Boyle, Marvin Chantry, Roy Christensen, Connie Ellison, Carl Gorodetzky, Lennie Haight, Sheldon Kurland, Dennis Molchan, Samuel Terranova, Gary VanOsdale, Stephanie Woolf
- String Arrangements: D. Bergen White

== Production ==
- Produced By Ron Chancey
- Engineers: Les Ladd
- Assistant Engineers: Steve Ham, Bob Krusen, Russ Martin, Steve Melton
- Mastering: Hank Williams

== Charts ==
=== Weekly charts ===
Chart (1981)	Peak position
Canadian Albums (RPM)	46
US Billboard 200	14
US Top Country Albums (Billboard)	1

=== Year-end charts ===
Chart (1981)	Position
US Billboard 200	77
US Top Country Albums (Billboard)	30

Chart (1982)	Position
US Top Country Albums (Billboard)	9

=== Singles ===
Year	Single	Peak chart positions					
Year	Single	US Country	US	US AC	CAN Country	CAN	CAN AC
1981	"Elvira"	1	5	8	1	26	13
1981	"(I'm Settin') Fancy Free"	1	104	17	2	—	—
