= Mama's Boys (The Oak Ridge Boys album) =

Studio album by The Oak Ridge Boys
- Released: October 2024
- Genre: Country
- Label: Lightning Rod Records
- Producer: Dave Cobb

The Oak Ridge Boys chronology
It's Only Natural (2011)	Mama's Boys (2024)

Mama's Boys is a concept album by the country band The Oak Ridge Boys. Joe Bonsall had been expected to take part in the recording of Mama's Boys before his death but ultimately did not do so. It marks the recording debut of Bonsall's replacement, Ben James, as the group's tenor. It was produced by Dave Cobb.

== Track listing ==
1. "That's the Way Mama Made It"
2. "Mama's Boys"
3. "Mama's Teaching Angels How to Sing"
4. "Ever with Me"
5. "Her Voice"
6. "Mama Sang for Me"
7. "Come On Home"
8. "I Thought About You, Lord" (featuring Willie Nelson)
9. "Sweetest Gift"
10. "Divine Witness"
