= It Takes a Little Rain (To Make Love Grow) =

Single by The Oak Ridge Boys

from the album Where the Fast Lane Ends
- B-side: "Looking for Love"
- Released: February 21, 1987
- Genre: Country
- Length: 3:58
- Label: MCA
- Songwriters: Roger Murrah, Steve Dean, James Dean Hicks
- Producer: Jimmy Bowen

The Oak Ridge Boys singles chronology
"You Made a Rock of a Rolling Stone" (1986)	"It Takes a Little Rain (To Make Love Grow)" (1987)	"This Crazy Love" (1987)

"It Takes a Little Rain (To Make Love Grow)" is a song written by Roger Murrah, Steve Dean and James Dean Hicks, and recorded by The Oak Ridge Boys. It was released in February 1987 as the first single from Where the Fast Lane Ends. It was their fourteenth number one country single. The single was at number one for a week and spent fourteen weeks on the chart.

== Charts ==
=== Weekly charts ===
Chart (1987)	Peak position
US Hot Country Songs (Billboard)	1
Canadian RPM Country Tracks	1

=== Year-end charts ===
Chart (1987)	Position
US Hot Country Songs (Billboard)	10
