= Everyday (The Oak Ridge Boys song) =

Single by The Oak Ridge Boys

from the album Greatest Hits 2
- B-side: "Ain't No Cure for the Rock and Roll"
- Released: July 14, 1984
- Genre: Country
- Length: 4:03
- Label: MCA
- Songwriters: Dave Loggins; J.D. Martin
- Producer: Ron Chancey

The Oak Ridge Boys singles chronology
"I Guess It Never Hurts to Hurt Sometimes" (1984)	"Everyday" (1984)	"Make My Life with You" (1984)

"Everyday" is a song written by Dave Loggins and J.D. Martin, and recorded by The Oak Ridge Boys. It was released in July 1984 as the first single from their Greatest Hits 2 compilation album. The song was The Oak Ridge Boys' tenth number one country single. It was at number one for a week and spent thirteen weeks on the country chart.

== Music video ==
The music video was filmed at the Tennessee Performing Arts Center in Nashville.

== Charts ==
=== Weekly charts ===
Chart (1984)	Peak position
US Hot Country Songs (Billboard)	1
Canadian RPM Country Tracks	1

=== Year-end charts ===
Chart (1984)	Position
US Hot Country Songs (Billboard)	35
