= This Crazy Love =

Single by The Oak Ridge Boys

from the album Where the Fast Lane Ends
- B-side: "Where the Fast Lane Ends"
- Released: June 13, 1987
- Genre: Country
- Length: 3:05
- Label: MCA
- Songwriters: Roger Murrah, James Dean Hicks
- Producer: Jimmy Bowen

The Oak Ridge Boys singles chronology
"It Takes a Little Rain (To Make Love Grow)" (1987)	"This Crazy Love" (1987)	"Time In" (1987)

"This Crazy Love" is a song written by Roger Murrah and James Dean Hicks, and recorded by The Oak Ridge Boys. It was released in June 1987 as the second single from Where the Fast Lane Ends. The song was The Oak Ridge Boys' fifteenth number one on the country chart. The single went to number one for one week and spent a total of fifteen weeks on the chart.

== Charts ==
=== Weekly charts ===
Chart (1987)	Peak position
US Hot Country Songs (Billboard)	1
Canadian RPM Country Tracks	2

=== Year-end charts ===
Chart (1987)	Position
US Hot Country Songs (Billboard)	13
