= An American Family (song) =

Single by The Oak Ridge Boys

from the album American Dreams
- B-side: "Too Many Heartaches"
- Released: August 19, 1989
- Genre: Country
- Length: 3:04
- Label: MCA
- Songwriter: Bob Corbin
- Producer: Jimmy Bowen

The Oak Ridge Boys singles chronology
"Beyond Those Years" (1989)	"An American Family" (1989)	"No Matter How High" (1989)

"An American Family" is a song written by Bob Corbin of Corbin/Hanner and recorded by The Oak Ridge Boys. It was released in 1989 as the first single from American Dreams. The song reached #4 on the Billboard Hot Country Singles & Tracks chart.

== Content ==
The song describes a typical 20th Century middle-class American family. The Oak Ridge Boys were inspired to record it after attending the inauguration of George H. W. Bush as President of the United States and wanted to record a song with a patriotic message. Joe Bonsall stated that the song was offered to them several years prior. They reconsidered it after Richard Sterban expressed an interest.

The group re-recorded the song in 2003 for their album "Colors", updated with a new verse referencing the September 11, 2001 terrorist attacks.

== Chart performance ==
Chart (1989)	Peak position
Canada Country Singles (RPM)	32
US Hot Country Songs (Billboard)	4

=== Year-end charts ===
Chart (1989)	Position
US Country Songs (Billboard)	73
