= Little Things (The Oak Ridge Boys song) =

Single by The Oak Ridge Boys

from the album Step On Out
- B-side: "The Secret of Love"
- Released: March 30, 1985
- Genre: Country
- Length: 3:24
- Label: MCA
- Songwriter: Billy Barber
- Producer: Ron Chancey

The Oak Ridge Boys singles chronology
"Make My Life with You" (1984)	"Little Things" (1985)	"Touch a Hand, Make a Friend" (1985)

"Little Things" is a song written by Billy Barber, recorded by The Oak Ridge Boys. It was released in March 1985 as the first single from Step On Out. It was The Oak Ridge Boys' twelfth number one country single, staying at number one for one week. It spent a total of thirteen weeks on the country chart.

== Charts ==
=== Weekly charts ===
Chart (1985)	Peak position
US Hot Country Songs (Billboard)	1
Canadian RPM Country Tracks	1

=== Year-end charts ===
Chart (1985)	Position
US Hot Country Songs (Billboard)	17
