= Unstoppable (The Oak Ridge Boys album) =

Studio album by The Oak Ridge Boys
- Released: 1991
- Genre: Country
- Length: 37:07
- Label: RCA
- Producer: Ron Chancey (tracks 1–6); Richard Landis (tracks 7–11)

The Oak Ridge Boys chronology
American Dreams (1989)	Unstoppable (1991)	The Long Haul (1992)

Unstoppable is the seventeenth album by The Oak Ridge Boys. It was released in 1991 on RCA Records. It includes "Lucky Moon", the last of their hits on Hot Country Songs. The album reached number 41 on Top Country Albums.

Two of the cuts on this album were later hits for other artists: "Heaven Bound (I'm Ready)" by Shenandoah and "Change My Mind" by John Berry.

== Track listing ==
No.	Title	Writer(s)	Length
1.	"Heaven Bound (I'm Ready)"	Dennis Linde	3:01
2.	"When It Comes to You"	Mike Geiger, Woody Mullis, Johnny Neel	3:25
3.	"Change My Mind"	A. J. Masters, Jason Blume	3:44
4.	"Your Love Made Me This Way"	Dennis Linde	3:05
5.	"If I Were You"	Billy Dean, Verlon Thompson	3:33
6.	"Walkin' After Midnight"	Alan Block, Don Hecht	2:23^{A}
7.	"Lucky Moon"	Mark Wright, Doug Johnson	3:25
8.	"In a Tender Moment"	Reed Nielsen, Monty Powell	4:17
9.	"Love This Cat"	Larson Paine, Bobby Paine	2:45
10.	"Baby on Board"	Jeff Silbar, J.C. Crowley	3:24
11.	"Our Love Is Here to Stay"	J. D. Martin, John Jarrard	4:05^{A}

- ^{A} Omitted from cassette version.

== Chart performance ==
Chart (1991)	Peak position
U.S. Billboard Top Country Albums	41
