= American Dreams (The Oak Ridge Boys album) =

Studio album by The Oak Ridge Boys
- Released: August 30, 1989
- Genre: Country
- Length: 38:24
- Label: MCA
- Producer: Jimmy Bowen

The Oak Ridge Boys chronology
Greatest Hits 3 (1989)	American Dreams (1989)	Unstoppable (1991)

Singles from American Dreams
- 1. "An American Family" Released: August 19, 1989; 2. "No Matter How High" Released: December 1989

American Dreams is the sixteenth album by The Oak Ridge Boys. It was released in 1989 via MCA Records. The album peaked at number 24 on the Billboard Top Country Albums chart. It includes a guest appearance by Little Feat and the singles "An American Family" and "No Matter How High", the latter of which was the group's last number one hit on Hot Country Songs.

The album cover depicts The Oak Ridge Boys in the stands along the left field line of Nashville, Tennessee's, Herschel Greer Stadium. Richard Sterban was a minority shareholder of the minor league Nashville Sounds, who played their home games at Greer.

== Track listing ==
No.	Title	Writer(s)	Length
1.	"Cajun Girl"	Martin Kibbee, Bill Payne	4:42
2.	"Baby, You'll Be My Baby"	Gene Pistilli, Troy Seals	3:41
3.	"An American Family"	Bob Corbin	3:01
4.	"No Matter How High"	Joey Scarbury, Even Stevens	2:52
5.	"If I Was to Start Crying"	Michael Smotherman	5:09
6.	"Turning for Home"	Mike Reid	3:46
7.	"In My Own Crazy Way"	Troy Seals, Eddie Setser, Frankie Miller, Rod Stewart	3:25
8.	"Don't Give Up"	Jerry Hludzik, Rick Manwiller	3:27
9.	"Bed of Roses"	Rex Benson, Steve Gillette	3:45
10.	"The American Dream"	Gary Harrison, Keith Stegall	4:37

== Personnel ==
=== The Oak Ridge Boys ===
- Duane Allen - lead
- Joe Bonsall - tenor
- Steve Sanders - baritone
- Richard Sterban - bass

=== Additional musicians ===
- Paul Barrere - electric guitar on "Cajun Girl"
- Sam Clayton - tambourine on "Cajun Girl"
- Dewey Dorough - saxophone
- Kenny Gradney - bass guitar on "Cajun Girl"
- Richie Hayward - drums on "Cajun Girl"
- Shane Keister - synthesizer
- Wade Benson Landry - fiddle
- Mike Lawler - synthesizer
- Paul Leim - drums, percussion
- Bill Payne - keyboards on "Cajun Girl"
- Matt Rollings - piano
- Leland Sklar - bass guitar
- Fred Tackett - acoustic guitar on "Cajun Girl"
- Billy Joe Walker Jr. - acoustic guitar, electric guitar
- Reggie Young - electric guitar

== Chart performance ==
Chart (1989)	Peak position
U.S. Billboard Top Country Albums	24
