= Bobbie Sue (song) =

Single by The Oak Ridge Boys

from the album Bobbie Sue
- B-side: "Live in Love"
- Released: January 18, 1982
- Recorded: Autumn 1981
- Genre: Country, Pop, doo-wop, rock and roll
- Length: 2:50
- Label: MCA
- Songwriters: Jerry Leiber; Mike Stoller; Wood Newton; Dan Tyler; Adele Tyler
- Producer: Ron Chancey

The Oak Ridge Boys singles chronology
| "(I'm Settin') Fancy Free" (1981) | "Bobbie Sue" (1982) | "So Fine" (1982) |

"Bobbie Sue" is a song written by Jerry Leiber, Mike Stoller, Wood Newton, Dan Tyler, and Adele Tyler, and recorded by The Oak Ridge Boys. It was released in January of 1982 as the first single from the group's album of the same name. The song became the Oaks' sixth No. 1 single on the Billboard magazine Hot Country Singles chart. "Bobbie Sue" also fared well on the Billboard Hot 100, peaking at No. 12. The single was certified RIAA Gold for sales of over 500,000 units.

== Background ==
The song is styled in the vein of a late 1950s/early 1960s rock-and-roll novelty song, as evidenced by its saxophone solo during the musical bridges.

== Charts ==
=== Weekly charts ===
| Chart (1982) | Peak position |
|---|---|
| US Billboard Hot 100 | 12 |
| US Adult Contemporary (Billboard) | 19 |
| US Hot Country Songs (Billboard) | 1 |
| Canadian RPM Country Tracks | 1 |
| Canadian RPM Singles | 20 |
| Canadian RPM Adult Contemporary Singles | 1 |

=== Year-end charts ===
| Chart (1982) | Position |
|---|---|
| US Hot Country Songs (Billboard) | 43 |
