= R. E. Winsett =

American composer and publisher (1876–1952)

- Born: January 15, 1876; Bledsoe County, Tennessee United States
- Died: June 26, 1952 (aged 76)
- Genres: Christian gospel

Robert Emmett Winsett (January 15, 1876 – June 26, 1952) was an American composer and publisher of gospel music.

== Biography ==
=== Early years ===
Winsett was born in Bledsoe County, Tennessee, and graduated from the Bowman Normal School of Music in 1899.

=== Musical career ===
He founded his own publishing company in 1903, and his first publication, Winsett's Favorite Songs, quickly became popular among the Baptist and Pentecostal churches of the American South. Pentecostal Power followed in 1907; that year Winsett completed postgraduate work at a conservatory.

He married Birdie Harris in 1908, and had three sons and two daughters with her. He settled in Fort Smith, Arkansas, continuing to compose gospel songs, of which he would write over 1,000 in total. He became a minister in 1923, and was affiliated with the Church of God (Seventh Day).

Birdie Harris died late in the 1920s, and shortly thereafter Winsett moved back to Tennessee. He founded a new company in Chattanooga, and published more shape note music books. He remarried, to Mary Ruth Edmonton, in 1930, and had three further children.

Winsett's final publication, Best of All (1951), sold over 1 million copies, and in total his books sold over ten million copies. His song "Jesus Is Coming Soon" won a Dove Award for Gospel Song of the Year at the 1969 awards. He has been inducted into the Southern Gospel Museum and Hall of Fame and the Gospel Music Hall of Fame.

He is buried in the Buttram Cemetery, Dayton, Tennessee.
