= Jimbeau Hinson =

American country music singer-songwriter (c. 1952–2022)

- Born: James L. Hinson Jr. October 29, 1952 (age 73); Newton, Mississippi, U.S.
- Died: March 4, 2022 (aged 70)
- Genres: Country
- Occupations: Singer, songwriter
- Instruments: Vocals, guitar
- Years active: 1969–2022
- Label: Winkled

James L. Hinson Jr. (October 29, 1952 – March 4, 2022), better known as Jimbeau Hinson, was an American country music singer-songwriter.

Hinson, along with co-writer Roy August, wrote the 1981 #1 Hot Country Songs hit, "Fancy Free", for The Oak Ridge Boys' album, Fancy Free (1981). The album was also a #1 on the Top Country Album chart and peaked at #14 on the Billboard 200. In 2010, "Fancy Free" attained the BMI 2 Million Spins Award, with over 13 years of aggregate broadcast time. Hinson wrote country hits for a number of artists, The Oak Ridge Boys, David Lee Murphy, Patty Loveless, Kathy Mattea, Brenda Lee, John Conlee, Steve Earle. Additional, artists who have recorded his songs include: Reba McEntire, Lynn Anderson, and Carol Channing.

Hinson performed as a country music from his teenage years in the late 1960s and began going by the name Jimbeau Hinson in the mid-1970s, to avoid any confusion with Muppets creator Jim Henson. Hinson signed a writing contract with The Wilburn Brothers publishing company at age seventeen and later recorded several singles for Chart Records. During the late 1970s, Hinson began a long-running relationship with The Oak Ridge Boys as a songwriter and assisted with the operations of their publishing company. In the late 1980s he was a contestant on Star Search.

Hinson released his first album as an artist, Strong Medicine, on Wrinkled Records in 2013.

Hinson was openly bisexual, although he was in a monogamous relationship with his wife Brenda from the 1980s. He was diagnosed with HIV in 1985. He suffered a stroke in 2021, and recovered, but suffered a second stroke in early 2022. Hinson died on March 4, 2022, at the age of 70.
