= Elvira (song) =

1965 single by Dallas Frazier

Single by Dallas Frazier

from the album Elvira
- B-side: "That Ain't No Stuff"
- Released: December 1965
- Recorded: October 4, 1965
- Studio: Columbia (Nashville)
- Genre: Country
- Length: 2:30
- Label: Capitol
- Songwriter: Dallas Frazier
- Producer: Marvin Hughes

Dallas Frazier singles chronology
"Space Command" (1954)	"Elvira" (1965)	"Just a Little Bit of You" (1965)

"Elvira" is a song written and originally recorded by Dallas Frazier. Though a minor hit for Frazier at the time of release, the song became a major pop and country hit for the Oak Ridge Boys in 1981. Not only does "Elvira" endure as one of the Oak Ridge Boys' signature songs, but it also is a standard in American popular music.

== Song history ==
Songwriter Dallas Frazier wrote "Elvira" in 1965 and recorded it on October 4 at Columbia Recording Studios in Nashville. It was released as a single in December and was also the title track of an album. Though the song is about a woman, Frazier chose the name "Elvira" based on the name of a street in East Nashville. The song's chorus bears a resemblance to the song "Searchin'" written by Jerry Leiber and Mike Stoller and recorded famously by the Coasters.

Frazier's recording peaked at number 72 on the Billboard Hot 100 and was a top-40 hit in Canada, reaching number 27.

A group called the Skunks and singer Baby Ray recorded their versions in 1967. Both versions were reviewed together in the 11 March issue of Cash Box, with the appeal of both being noted. The single was a Billboard Spotlight Single, Hot 100 prediction for the week of 25 February. A number of other artists recorded the song through the years, with varying degrees of success, including Kenny Rogers and the First Edition. Rogers' version appeared on the album Something's Burning.

"Elvira"

Single by Rodney Crowell

from the album Ain't Living Long Like This
- B-side: "Ashes by Now"
- Released: August 1978
- Genre: Country
- Length: 3:30
- Label: Warner Bros. Nashville
- Songwriter: Dallas Frazier
- Producer: Brian Ahern

Rodney Crowell singles chronology
"Elvira" (1978)	"Baby Better Start Turnin' 'Em Down" (1978)

In 1978, Rodney Crowell recorded his cover of "Elvira", which peaked at number 95 on the Billboard Hot Country Songs chart. Baby Ray Eddlemon also recorded "Elvira" on Imperial Records in 1967.

== The Oak Ridge Boys version ==
"Elvira"

Single by the Oak Ridge Boys

from the album Fancy Free
- B-side: "A Woman Like You"
- Released: March 1981 (U.S.)
- Recorded: 1981
- Studio: Woodland (Nashville, Tennessee)
- Genre: Country pop
- Length: 3:40 (album version); 2:36 (single edit)
- Label: MCA
- Songwriter: Dallas Frazier
- Producer: Ron Chancey

The Oak Ridge Boys singles chronology
"Beautiful You" (1980)	"Elvira" (1981)	"(I'm Settin') Fancy Free" (1981)

The Oak Ridge Boys recorded "Elvira" for their 1981 album Fancy Free after their producer Ron Chancey recommended it. Duane Allen said of the Frazier version, "I heard it once and never forgot it. That's when you know a song is a hit." Their rendition featured Joe Bonsall on lead vocals, and at Chancey's suggestion, bass singer Richard Sterban on the chorus ("Giddyup, ba oom, papa oom, papa mow mow"). Allen said, "We wanted 'Elvira' to be a summer record for families of four .... Mom's singing the verses, the kids sing the 'giddy up' hook, and dad comes in with the 'oom papa' chorus. It's the best planning we ever did." "Elvira" quickly climbed the Billboard Hot Country Singles chart, and over Memorial Day weekend, it became the group's fourth number-one country hit. It was also their biggest pop hit, reaching number one on the Cashbox Top 100 on August 1, and peaking at number five on the Billboard Hot 100 that July and August.

"Elvira" was certified platinum for sales of two million units by the Recording Industry Association of America, a distinction for a country song that for years it shared only with "Islands in the Stream" by Kenny Rogers and Dolly Parton.

In 1982 at the 24th Annual Grammy Awards, "Elvira" by the Oak Ridge Boys won the Grammy for Best Country Performance by a Duo or Group with Vocal.

=== Single and album edits ===
The single version fades out after the first key change, more than a minute earlier than the album version (which features two more key changes and "oom pa-pa mow mow" choruses).

=== Re-recordings ===
The group has re-recorded the song several times since its original release.

In 2009, a live version was released on the group's A Gospel Journey DVD and CD. This version includes a guest appearance from Tim Duncan on bass vocals for one line.

In 2011, in recognition of the 30th anniversary of the group's original recording, a new version was recorded and released on It's Only Natural, an album released exclusively through Cracker Barrel Old Country Store. The new version was produced by the original's producer, Ron Chancey.

Also in 2011, a version was recorded with the Dukes of Dixieland for their When Country Meets Dixie album.

Another live version was released on the Oak Ridge Boys' 2014 live album, Boys Night Out.

In 2015, the Oak Ridge Boys recorded the song with a cappella group Home Free on their album Country Evolution.

In 2017, the group recorded a "live-in-the-studio" version with Blake Shelton as a Spotify exclusive release.

In 2018, the group wrote a variation of "Elvira" in collaboration with the Tennessee Titans named "Titans Code of Conduct". Although the lyrics were changed drastically, the melody stays the same.

== Charts ==
=== Year-end charts ===
==== Dallas Frazier ====
Chart (1966)	Peak position
US Billboard Hot 100	72
Canadian RPM Top Singles	27

==== Rodney Crowell ====
Chart (1978)	Peak position
US Hot Country Songs (Billboard)	95

==== The Oak Ridge Boys ====
Chart (1981)	Peak position
Australia (Kent Music Report)	87
Canadian RPM Country Tracks	1
Canadian RPM Top Singles	26
Canadian RPM Adult Contemporary Tracks	13
New Zealand (Recorded Music NZ)	13
US Hot Country Songs (Billboard)	1
US Billboard Hot 100	5
US Adult Contemporary (Billboard)	8
US Cash Box Top 100	1

Chart (1981)	Rank
US Billboard Hot 100	31
US Cash Box Top 100	18
