= Gonna Take a Lot of River =

Single by The Oak Ridge Boys

from the album Monongahela
- B-side: "Private Lives"
- Released: July 1988
- Genre: Country
- Length: 3:00
- Label: MCA
- Songwriters: Mark Henley, John Kurhajetz
- Producer: Jimmy Bowen

The Oak Ridge Boys singles chronology
"True Heart" (1988)	"Gonna Take a Lot of River" (1988)	"Bridges and Walls" (1988)

"Gonna Take a Lot of River", with the full name "Gonna Take a Lot of River (Mississippi, Monongahela, Ohio)", is a song written by John Kurhajetz and Mark Henley, and recorded by the Oak Ridge Boys. It was released in July 1988 as the lead single from Monongahela.

In October 1988, the song hit number one on the Billboard Hot Country Singles chart. "Gonna Take a Lot of River" was the first song to feature Steve Sanders, who succeeded William Lee Golden in the group's lineup.

In 2011, the group rerecorded the song with a new arrangement and Joe Bonsall on lead vocals for It's Only Natural.

== Chart positions ==
Chart (1988)	Peak position
US Hot Country Songs (Billboard)	1
Canadian RPM Country Tracks	1

=== Year-end charts ===
Chart (1988)	Position
US Hot Country Songs (Billboard)	23
