= Roger Murrah =

American songwriter

- Born: Roger Alan Murrah; November 20, 1946 (age 79); Athens, Alabama, U.S.
- Origin: Nashville, Tennessee
- Occupation: Songwriter
- Website: MurrahMusic.com

Roger Alan Murrah (born November 20, 1946) is an American songwriter and independent music publisher who has written hits for artists including Waylon Jennings, Alan Jackson, Al Jarreau, and Alabama.

== Biography ==
=== Early life ===
Roger Murrah was born on November 20, 1946, in Athens, Alabama.

=== Career ===
After working in the late 1960s as a staff writer, he opened his own studio in Huntsville, Alabama. He then moved to Nashville, Tennessee, and in 1972 made his first appearance on the national charts with "It's Raining in Seattle" by Wynn Stewart. In 1990, he started his own publishing company, Murrah Music and in 1992 was named Billboard's Independent Publisher of the Year. Murrah signees include: Mark Alan Springer, Neal Coty, Rachel Proctor, Luke Bryan, Rebecca Lynn Howard, Steve Azar, Phillip White, Rachel Thibodeau, Michael Mobley, Jimmy Melton and Jon Henderson. His songs have been recorded by artists including: Al Jarreau, Alan Jackson, Barbara Mandrell, Tanya Tucker, The Oak Ridge Boys, Wynonna Judd, Mel Tillis, Take 6, Alabama, Conway Twitty, Ronnie Milsap, and Waylon Jennings.

He was inducted into the Nashville Songwriters Hall of Fame in 2005. Additionally, he has served five terms as Chairman of the Nashville Songwriters Hall of Fame Foundation (NaSHOF), and two consecutive terms as president of the Nashville Songwriters Association International (NSAI).

== Number one hits ==
- "Southern Rains" — Mel Tillis 1981
- "Life's Highway" — Steve Wariner 1986
- "Hearts Aren't Made to Break (They're Made to Love)" — Lee Greenwood 1986
- "It Takes a Little Rain (To Make Love Grow)" — Oak Ridge Boys 1987
- "This Crazy Love" — Oak Ridge Boys 1987
- "High Cotton" — Alabama 1989
- "Southern Star" — Alabama 1990
- "Don't Rock the Jukebox" — Alan Jackson 1991
- "I'm in a Hurry (And Don't Know Why)" — Alabama 1992
- "If I Could Make a Living" — Clay Walker 1994

== Awards ==
- 1988 BMI Songwriter of the Year
- 1980's BMI Songwriter of the Decade
- BMI Millionaire Airplay Award (for over one million radio performances of Al Jarreau's "We're in This Love Together.")
- 3rd BMI Millionaire Airplay Award (for over three million radio performances of Al Jarreau's "We're in This Love Together.")
- CMA Song Of The Year Nomination (1991) Alan Jackson's "Don't Rock the Jukebox."
- CMA Song Of The Year Nomination (1992) Alan Jackson's "Don't Rock the Jukebox."
- BMI 2nd Millionaire Airplay Award (for over two million radio performances of Alan Jackson's "Don't Rock the Jukebox.")
- BMI Millionaire Airplay Award (for over one million radio performances of Wynonna's "Only Love.")
- BMI 2nd Millionaire Airplay Award (for over two million radio performances of Alabama's "High Cotton.")
- BMI Millionaire Airplay Award (for over one million radio performances of Alabama's "Southern Star.")
- BMI 2nd Millionaire Airplay Award (for over two million radio performances of Alabama's "I'm In A Hurry (And Don't Know Why).")
- BMI 2nd Millionaire Airplay Award (for over two million radio performances of Tanya Tucker's "It's a Little Too Late.")
- BMI Millionaire Airplay Award (for over one million radio performances of The Oak Ridge Boys' "This Crazy Love.")
- BMI Millionaire Airplay Award (for over one million radio performances of Travis Tritt's "Where Corn Don't Grow.")
