= Duane Allen =

American singer (born 1943)

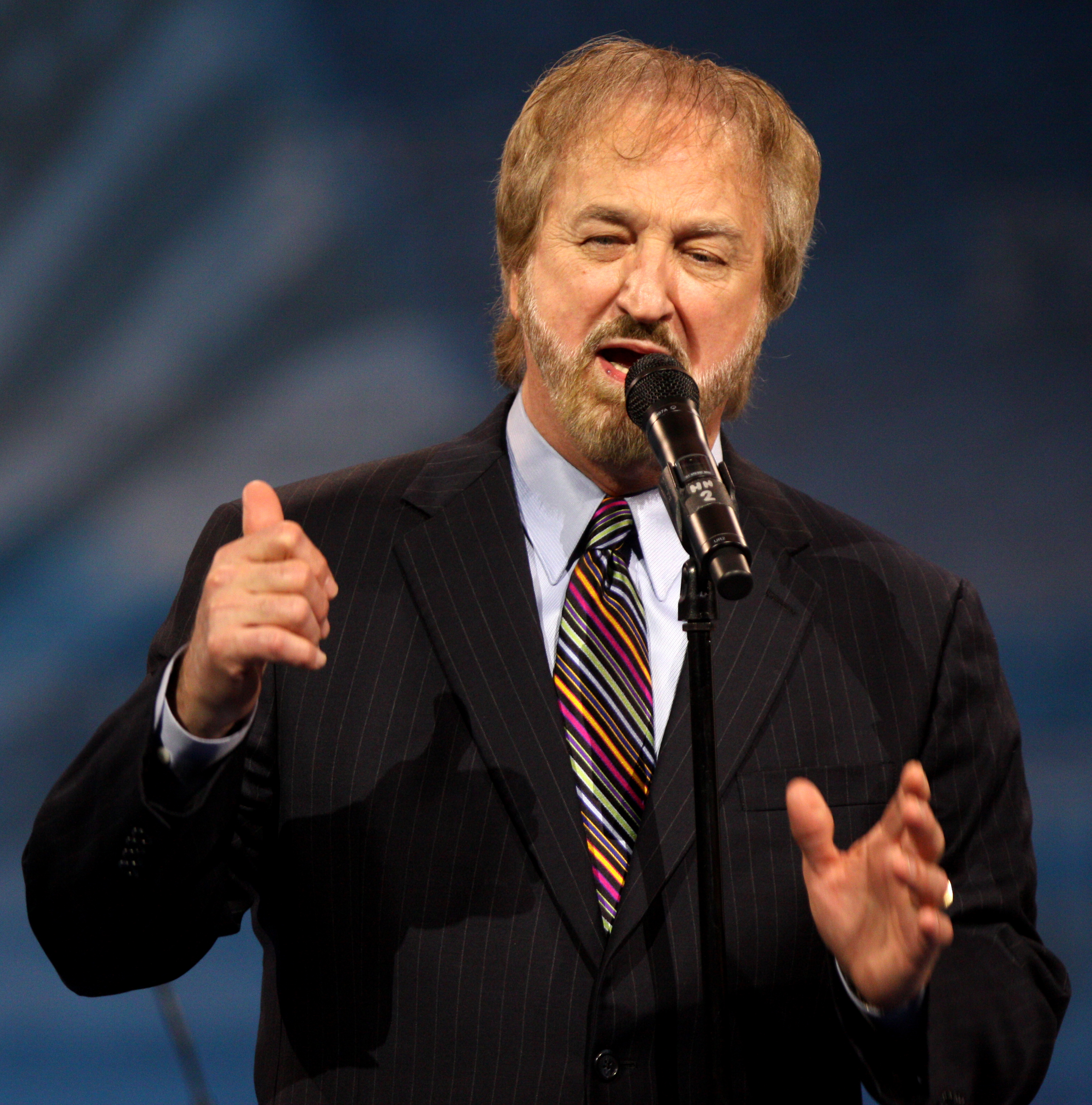
- Allen in 2013

Background information
- Born: Duane David Allen; April 29, 1943 (age 83)
- Origin: Cunningham, Lamar County, Texas
- Genres: Country, gospel
- Occupation: Singer
- Years active: 1966–present
- Member of: The Oak Ridge Boys

Duane David Allen (born April 29, 1943) is an American singer and songwriter, who had formal training in both operatic and quartet singing before becoming a member of the Oak Ridge Boys in 1966. Allen is the lead singer for the quartet and is heard on the majority of their most successful songs. Allen was inducted into the Country Music Hall of Fame in 2015 as a member of the Oak Ridge Boys. He was later inducted into the SGMA Hall of Fame in 2025, for his Gospel music contribution.

== Biography ==
Allen attended East Texas State University, graduating in 1966, where he was a member of Delta Tau Delta International Fraternity.

Allen was inducted in the Texas Gospel Music Hall of Fame, and in 2014, he was inducted into the Texas Country Music Hall of Fame.

== Honors ==
In 2014, Allen received a memorial bridge honor in his hometown in Texas.

== Personal life ==
Allen resides in Hendersonville, Tennessee. He was married to Norah Lee Allen, a backup singer on the Grand Ole Opry; she died in 2024. Their daughter Jamie is married to musician Paul Martin, formerly of Exile, and of Marty Stuart's band, the Fabulous Superlatives. The Martins formed a family band with their children called Rockland Road. Son Dee is also a musician; both Paul Martin and he have performed with the Oak Ridge Boys.
