= The Oak Ridge Boys =

American country and gospel vocal quartet

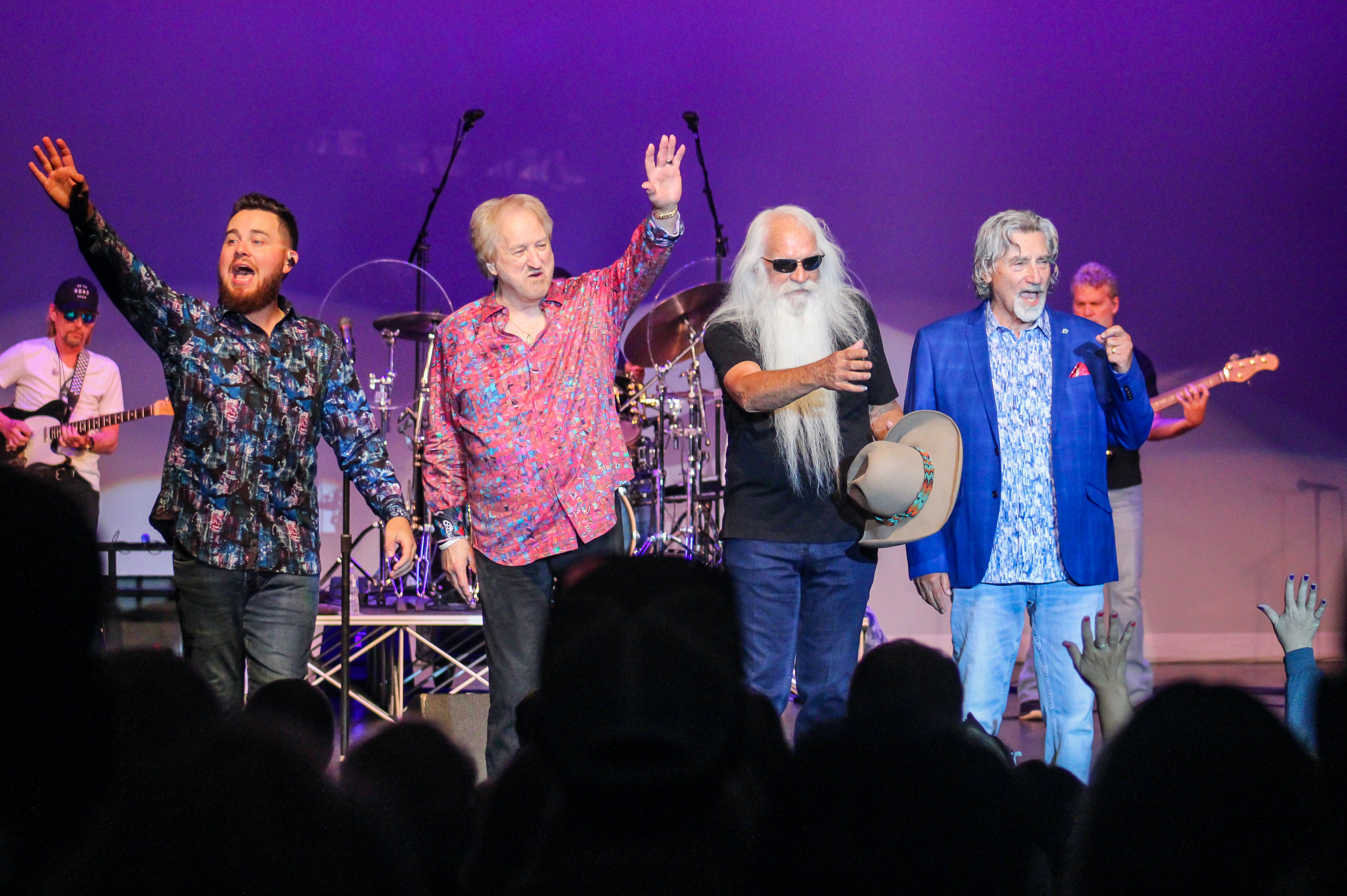
- The Oak Ridge Boys in 2024 (from left to right: Ben James, Duane Allen, William Lee Golden, and Richard Sterban)

Background information
- Also known as: Wally Fowler and the Georgia Clodhoppers (1943–1948); The Oak Ridge Quartet (1948–1961)
- Origin: Oak Ridge, Tennessee, U.S.
- Genres: Country, Gospel
- Years active: 1943–present
- Labels: ABC, MCA Nashville, Heart Warming Records, Columbia, Spring Hill, Gaither Music Group, Thirty Tigers, Lightning Rod Records
- Members: William Lee Golden; Duane Allen; Ben James
- Past members: Curly Kinsey; Lon Freeman; Wally Fowler; Johnny New; Monroe (Curley) Blaylock; Bob Weber; Pat Patterson; Joe Allred; Bob Prather; Carlos Cook; Calvin Newton; Cat Freeman; Les Roberson; Ron Page; Bill Smith; Ronnie Page; Smitty Gatlin; Hobert Evans; Bobby Clark; Tommy Fairchild; Herman Harper; James Metz; Willie Wynn; Gary McSpadden; Jim Hamill; Noel Fox; Joe Bonsall; Steve Sanders; Dee Allen; Richard Sterban
- Website: www.oakridgeboys.com

The Oak Ridge Boys are an American vocal quartet. The group consists of Duane Allen (lead), William Lee Golden (baritone), Aaron McCune (Bass), who replaced Richard Sterban in 2026, and Ben James, who replaced Joe Bonsall as tenor in December 2023. Allen, Bonsall, Golden, and Richard Sterban comprised the group's longest-lasting lineup, from 1973 until 2023, except for the period between 1987 and 1995 when Golden was replaced by Steve Sanders.

The band was founded in 1943 as Wally Fowler and the Georgia Clodhoppers, but were soon known as The Oak Ridge Quartet. They became popular in Southern gospel in the 1950s and their name was changed to Oak Ridge Boys in the 1960s. They moved from traditional southern gospel to contemporary gospel before going into country music in the mid-1970s.

The Oak Ridge Boys became mainstream in the late 1970s, including their appearance on "Slip Slidin' Away" with Paul Simon, and reached their commercial peak in 1981 with their cover of "Elvira", a top five hit on the Billboard Hot 100.

== History ==
=== The Oak Ridge Quartet ===
The core group that eventually led to the Oak Ridge Boys was a country group called Wally Fowler and the Georgia Clodhoppers, formed in 1943 in Knoxville, Tennessee. They were requested to perform for staff members and their families restricted during World War II at the Oak Ridge National Laboratory in nearby Oak Ridge, Tennessee. They were asked to sing there so often that eventually they changed their name to the Oak Ridge Quartet, and because their most popular songs were gospel, Fowler decided to focus solely on Southern gospel music. At the time, the quartet consisted of Wally Fowler, Lon "Deacon" Freeman, Curly Kinsey, and Johnny New. This group began recording in 1947. Wally Fowler and the Oak Ridge Quartet were members of the Grand Ole Opry in the 1940s. In 1949, the other three men split from Fowler to form a new group, Curley Kinsey and the Tennessee Ridge Runners, so Fowler hired an existing group, the Calvary Quartet, to reform the Oak Ridge Quartet. Walt Cornell sang baritone for the Oak Ridge Quartet in the early 1950s. In 1957, Fowler sold the rights to the "Oak Ridge Quartet" name to group member Smitty Gatlin in exchange for forgiveness of a debt. As a result of more personnel changes, the group lost its tenor, so they lowered their arrangements and had Gatlin sing tenor, while the pianist, Tommy Fairchild, sang lead. They recorded an album for Cadence Records, then in 1958, they hired Willie Wynn to sing the tenor part, and Fairchild returned exclusively to the piano. At this point, the group consisted of Fairchild, Wynn, Gatlin, baritone Ron Page, and bass Herman Harper. They recorded an album on the Checker Records label, one on Starday, and three on Skylite. In 1961, Gatlin renamed the group to "the Oak Ridge Boys" because their producer, Bud Praeger, thought "Oak Ridge Quartet" was too old-fashioned.

=== 1962–1973 ===
When Page left in 1962, Gary McSpadden, who had filled in for Jake Hess in The Statesmen Quartet, became baritone with the understanding that when Hess was ready to start a group, he would recruit McSpadden. They recorded another album on Skylite, and then two albums on Warner Bros. Records. When Hess followed through, McSpadden quit to join the Imperials. Jim Hamill (who later became a member of the Kingsmen Quartet) was hired as his replacement. They made one album for Festival Records, one for Stateswood (Skylite's budget label), and two for Skylite. Hamill did not get along with the other Oaks, and William Lee Golden, a relative newcomer to the music industry, felt Hamill was hurting the act and suggested himself as a replacement. After Hamill's departure in 1964, Golden joined as baritone.

The group recorded an album for Starday and another on Skylite before Gatlin left in 1966. On Golden's recommendation, Duane Allen, former baritone of the Prophets, was hired as their new lead singer. With Willie Wynn and Herman Harper still on board, the group made another album for Skylite and one for United Artists before making a dozen albums between 1966 and 1973 for Heart Warming. They also had an album on Vista (Heart Warming's budget label) consisting of unreleased songs from previous sessions. When Harper departed in 1968 to join the Don Light Talent Agency (before starting his own company, the Harper Agency), Noel Fox, formerly of the Tennesseans and the Harvesters, became the band's bass. In 1971, the Oak Ridge Boys won their first Grammy Award for a Jerry Reed song, "Talk About the Good Times"; Reed played guitar on the track.

In 1972, Richard Sterban, a member of the Stamps Quartet, joined the Oak Ridge Boys after the departure of Noel Fox. As a result, the quartet appearing on Hee Haw that year consisted of Allen, Wynn, Golden, and Sterban, and they collaborated in a single with Johnny Cash and the Carter Family, "Praise the Lord and Pass the Soup", that put the Oak Ridge Boys on the country charts for the first time. After completing their first Columbia album, Wynn departed and was replaced by Joe Bonsall in October 1973. (Bonsall replaced Wynn's vocals on half of the album.) The lineup remained constant for the next 14 years.

=== 1974–1986 ===
In 1975, the Oak Ridge Boys, after a brief flirtation with pop music, signed with country music promoter Jim Halsey, who as their new manager, encouraged them not only to leave gospel music behind by becoming a country act, the most fundamental change in their history, but also to present themselves as a singing quartet rather than as an eight-man band.

The group's move to Columbia resulted in three albums and several singles. In 1976, they toured Russia in support of Roy Clark. They were not a label priority, and their musical direction (pop, gospel, country) was unclear. While promoting the single "Heaven Bound", the Oak Ridge Boys made appearances on The Mike Douglas Show and The Merv Griffin Show. In an attempt to widen their appeal, they sang backup with Jimmy Buffett on one of his songs. Despite an offer by Paul Simon to sing backup on "Slip Slidin' Away", the group asked to be released from their contract after "Family Reunion", written by David Allan Coe, was not a hit. Columbia complied, and the band immediately made an album that was a mix of gospel, pop, and country on their own label, for sale at their concerts.

In 1977, the Oak Ridge Boys became a mainstream country artist with their first ABC Records album, Y'all Come Back Saloon. The cover photo was the last to depict them as an eight-man group, although the band did not play on the album as on prior releases. Room Service broadened their reach into pop music while having three more country hits, including "I'll Be True to You", which was featured on the previous album and became their first of seventeen number-one singles on the Billboard Hot Country Songs charts. The Oak Ridge Boys Have Arrived provided three more hits, two of which crossed over, in 1979. After MCA Records acquired ABC, Together was released in 1980, followed by a compilation in the autumn, Greatest Hits, with ten hits from their first four ABC/MCA albums.

Their next project, Fancy Free, released early in 1981, contained the Dallas Frazier song "Elvira". This remains their most widely known record, and Fancy Free their best-selling album. "Elvira" was recorded by other artists, including Frazier himself in the late 1960s and Kenny Rogers and the First Edition in 1970, but the Oak Ridge Boys were the first to make it a major hit. Their version sold platinum, hit number one on the country chart, and number five on the pop chart. In 1984, they became the first country act to be honored with the RIAA's multi-platinum award, recognizing double-platinum sales for their album Fancy Free.

The doo-wop-style title track from Bobbie Sue, their eighth album, was another crossover hit, reaching number one on the country chart and number 12 on the pop chart. That album also featured the group's first domestic music video, for their minor hit "So Fine". (A video was made for "Easy", from the Y'all Come Back Saloon album, but was never released in the U.S.) The group also recorded one of their biggest sellers, The Oak Ridge Boys Christmas, featuring their smash hit "Thank God for Kids" in 1982. Their all-pop ninth album, American Made, released in January 1983, was also a success. The title track was used as a television advertisement for Miller Beer, although the Oaks did not sing in the advertisement.

Their new MCA contract was among the biggest of its era in the music industry, with three new albums over the next four years. The 1983 album Deliver had two hit singles, one of which was their last major hit. "I Guess It Never Hurts to Hurt Sometimes", was written by Randy VanWarmer, best known for his soft rock classic "Just When I Needed You Most". They issued another compilation, Greatest Hits 2, in 1984. Unlike their first, Volume Two included two new songs, "Everyday" and "Make My Life with You", both of which became number-one hits.

In 1985, they released their eleventh album, Step On Out, the title song of which was written by former Byrd member Chris Hillman. Although it was a hit, Step On Out was their first ABC/MCA album to indicate declining sales, despite the success of the lead single, "Little Things". After "Little Things," only a few of their hit songs in the coming years matched the quality of their earlier work; the others, regardless of chart position, made little to no impact. In 1986, the group issued a top-10 album, Seasons, which had two minor hit singles (one of them written by Kix Brooks, and the more successful of the two by Orleans members Larry Hoppen and John Hall), as well as a second holiday album, which did not match the popularity of their first.

=== 1987–1999 ===
After several years of conflict within the group generally, exacerbated by Golden's solo album in 1986 (which coincided with Bonsall's solo hit with Sawyer Brown), Allen, Sterban, and Bonsall chose to stay together, but went forward without Golden. According to Golden, the other group members believed that Golden's long hair and beard did not suit the group's image. Shortly after releasing their first album with label boss Jimmy Bowen as producer, Golden left the band. Where the Fast Lane Ends included guest appearances by Patti LaBelle and Joe Walsh, both of whom were brought into the project by Golden. He was replaced by the band's guitarist, Steve Sanders, who was featured on most of their later hits.

The Oaks released three more albums at MCA and another greatest-hits project. In hopes of elevating their career, they moved to RCA Nashville for their next two albums, along with another compilation, Best of the Oak Ridge Boys, which included their minor hit cover of "(You're My) Soul and Inspiration" from the My Heroes Have Always Been Cowboys soundtrack. As with older artists in the early 1990s, the Oaks began to have decreased airplay with country radio by the end of 1991. They changed labels again and signed with Liberty Records, later Capitol Records Nashville, for which they made their third Christmas album, their final project with Sanders.

When Sanders quit the group in 1995, he was replaced for the rest of the tour first by Dee Allen, and later by Paul Martin (Duane Allen's son, and son-in-law, respectively); Martin had also replaced J.P. Pennington as lead singer of Exile a few years earlier. At midnight on January 1, 1996 in Chicago, Golden returned to the act. After departing Capitol, they released a two-disc set, Revival (their first gospel album since 1976) with Leon Russell producing, for television and mail-order distribution, in 1997. Sanders died by suicide in 1998.

Over the next few years, the group toured, hosted their own Las Vegas variety series for TNN, collaborated on an album with polka instrumentalist Jimmy Sturr, and made a one-off album for Platinum Records titled Voices.

=== 2000–2020 ===
After almost a decade of dealing with labels that had little interest in promoting the Oak Ridge Boys and poor sales, they were inducted into the Gospel Music Hall of Fame in 2000, and their fortunes improved when they signed with Spring Hill Records that same year. Over the next six years with producer Michael Sykes, they were nominated for four Grammy Awards. The quartet released two gospel albums, two Christmas albums, and three frontline albums, concluding with Front Row Seats in 2006, an unsuccessful attempt to marry a message album to mainstream country with modern, aggressive arrangements and song selection, including the single "It's Hard to Be Cool in a Mini-Van".

In 2007, they appeared on Shooter Jennings' The Wolf, which led to their own album, The Boys Are Back, in 2009. Named for the title song written by Jennings, it debuted at number 16 on the Billboard Country chart and number 77 on the Top 200. The album was produced by Dave Cobb, who was hired by Jennings. Reviews were mixed, but most praised their cover of The White Stripes' "Seven Nation Army".

In 2011, they became members of the Grand Ole Opry, making them the only group inducted twice, albeit in two different incarnations (the Fowler group was inducted in 1945). Also in 2011, thay released It's Only Natural, which debuted at number 16 on the Billboard Country albums chart, remaining in the country top 40 for almost two months. It contained five new songs, five re-recordings of hits from the Sanders era, a new version of Golden's 1990 solo single, "Louisiana Red Dirt Highway", and a 30th-anniversary re-recording of "Elvira".

In 2015, they were inducted into the Country Music Hall of Fame by Kenny Rogers, with whom the Oaks often toured during their peak years. Although featured on most of their later hits, Sanders was not inducted.

In 2018, they sang "Amazing Grace" at the funeral of George H. W. Bush, as he had requested.

=== 2021–present: 50th anniversary tour, deaths of Bonsall and Sterban ===
On September 19, 2023, due to a decline in Joe Bonsall's health, the Oak Ridge Boys announced that all remaining dates on the tour marking their golden anniversary under the then-current lineup would be billed as a farewell tour. Bonsall left the group at the end of their annual Christmas tour and was replaced by Ben James. James, previously of Doyle Lawson & Quicksilver, debuted as the Oaks' new tenor on December 30 in Biloxi, although Bonsall did not publicly announce his retirement until January. Bonsall's health was declining of what was subsequently revealed to be amyotropic lateral sclerosis, and died on July 9, 2024, aged 76.

In October 2024, the group released Mama's Boys, their first album with James. It was initially expected that Bonsall would be included in some way; ultimately having no part in the project. Dedicated to Bonsall, the album features a guest appearance from Willie Nelson. The addition of James to the lineup led the group to cancel its retirement plans and continue performing.

Under treatment for pancreatic cancer, Sterban withdrew from touring in May 2025. Bass singers Aaron McCune, formerly of Dailey & Vincent, and Tim Duncan, formerly with Ernie Haase & Signature Sound, filled in for Sterban. McCune sung bass for them in 2026 with Sterban taking a limited role when the group performs in Nashville. Sterban died from pancreatic cancer and complications of bronchitis and pneumonia on November 14, 2026.

== Discography ==
=== Studio albums ===
- The Oak Ridge Quartet (1958; as The Oak Ridge Quartet)
- Sing and Shout (1959; as The Oak Ridge Quartet)
- The Oak Ridge Quartet (1959; as The Oak Ridge Quartet)
- Master Showmen of Song (1960; as The Oak Ridge Quartet)
- Go Out to the Program (1960; as The Oak Ridge Quartet)
- You'll Never Walk Alone (1961; as The Oak Ridge Quartet)
- He Whispers Sweet Peace to Me (1962; as The Oak Ridge Quartet)
- With Sounds of Nashville (1962; first album as Oak Ridge Boys)
- Folk Minded Spirituals for Spiritual Minded Folk (1963)
- Together (with The Harvesters, 1964)
- Sing for You (1964)
- Singing the Gospel (1964)
- I Wouldn't Take Nothing for My Journey Now (1964)
- The Sensational Oak Ridge Boys from Nashville Tennessee (1965)
- The Solid Gospel Sound of the Oak Ridge Quartet (1965)
- River of Life (1966)
- Sing Serve Life (with Smitty Gatlin, 1966)
- Songs We Wish We'd Recorded First (1966)
- Duane Allen Out Front (1967)
- At Their Best (1967)
- A Great Day (1967)
- New Horizons (1968)
- It's Happening! (1969)
- Thanks (1969)
- Talk About the Good Times (1970)
- International (1970)
- Jesus Christ, What a Man! (1971)
- Performance (1971)
- Light (1972)
- Street Gospel (1973)
- The Lighthouse & Other Gospel Hits (1973)
- Hymns (1973)
- The Oak Ridge Boys (1974)
- Sky High (1975)
- Old Fashioned, Down Home, Hand Clappin', Foot Stompin', Southern Style, Gospel Quartet Music (1976)
- Live (1977)
- Y'all Come Back Saloon (1977)
- Room Service (1978)
- The Oak Ridge Boys Have Arrived (1979)
- Together (1980)
- Fancy Free (1981)
- Bobbie Sue (1982)
- Christmas (1982)
- American Made (1983)
- Deliver (1983)
- Step On Out (1985)
- Seasons (1986)
- Christmas Again (1986)
- Where the Fast Lane Ends (1987)
- Heartbeat (1987)
- Monongahela (1988)
- American Dreams (1989)
- Unstoppable (1991)
- The Long Haul (1992)
- Country Christmas Eve (1995)
- Revival (1997)
- Voices (1999)
- From the Heart (2001)
- An Inconvenient Christmas (2002)
- Colors (2003)
- The Journey (2004)
- Common Thread (2005)
- Christmas Cookies (2005)
- Front Row Seats (2006)
- A Gospel Journey (2009)
- The Boys Are Back (2009)
- It's Only Natural (2011)
- Back Home Again: Gospel Favorites (2012)
- Christmas Time's A-Coming (2012)
- Rock of Ages, Hymns and Gospel Favorites (2015)
- Celebrate Christmas (2016)
- 17th Avenue Revival (2018)
- Down Home Christmas (2019)
- Front Porch Singin' (2021)
- Mama's Boys (2024)

== Personnel ==
=== Current members ===
- William Lee Golden – baritone (1965–1987, 1996–present)
- Duane Allen – lead, occasional rhythm guitar (1966–present)
- Ben James – tenor (touring 2023–2024; 2024–present)

with

- Aaron McCune – bass (touring substitute 2022–present)

=== Former members ===
- Curly Kinsey – bass (1943–47; died 1964)
- Lon "Deacon" Freeman – baritone, guitar (1943–49; died 2003)
- Wally Fowler – lead (1943–52; died 1994)
- Johnny New – tenor (1943–49, 1952; deceased)
- Monroe (Curley) Blaylock – bass (1947–49; died 1972)
- Bob Weber – bass (1949–56)
- Pat Patterson – baritone (1949–52), lead (1952–53)
- Joe Allred – tenor (1949–52; died 1996)
- Bob Prather – baritone (1952)
- Carlos Cook – lead (1952–53); baritone (1953-54)
- Calvin Newton – lead (1953–56; died 2023)
- Cat Freeman – tenor (1954–56; died 1989)
- Les Roberson – baritone (1955–56)
- Ron Page – bass (1956; died 2021)
- Bill Smith – bass (1957)
- Ronnie Page – baritone (1957–62; died 2021)
- Smitty Gatlin – lead (1957–58, 1959–66); tenor (1958–59; died 1972)
- Hobert Evans – tenor (1957–58; died 2026)
- Wallace Edwards – tenor (substitute 1958; died 2001)
- Bobby Clark – tenor (1958; died 2014)
- Tommy Fairchild – lead (1958–59); piano (1959–60, 1961–72)
- Herman Harper – bass (1957–68; died 1993)
- Willie Wynn – tenor (1958–73)
- Gary McSpadden – baritone (1962–63; died 2020)
- Jim Hamill – baritone (1963–64; died 2007)
- Noel Fox – bass (1969–72; died 2003)
- Richard Sterban – bass (1972–2026; not touring 2025–2026; died 2026)
- Joe Bonsall – tenor (1973–2024; did not tour in 2024; died 2024)
- Steve Sanders – baritone (1987–95); rhythm guitar (1982–1987; died 1998)
- Dee Allen – baritone (substitute 1995)
- Paul Martin – baritone (substitute 1995); bass guitar (1997-2002)
- Rudy Gatlin - tenor (substitute 2022)
- Jimmy Fortune - tenor (substitute 2022)
- Woody Wright - lead (substitute 2024)
- Tim Duncan - bass (substitute 2025)

=== Band ===
==== Current members ====
- Rex Wiseman – fiddle, pedal steel guitar, mandolin, guitar (2003–present)
- Scotty Simpson – bass guitar (2013–present)
- Austin Curcuruto – drums, percussion (2017–present)
- Darin Favorite – lead guitar (2021–present)
- Andrew Ishee – piano (2024–present)

==== Former members ====
- Boyce Hawkins – piano (1949)
- Bobby Whitfield – piano (1950–52, 1954–1956)
- Glen Allred – guitar, vocals (1951–52)
- Powell Hassell – piano (1957–58)
- Gary Trusler – piano (1960)
- James Goss – piano (1960)
- Mark Ellerbee – drums (1969–79)
- Don Breland – bass guitar (1969–87)
- John Rich – guitar, steel guitar (1972–75)
- Tony Brown – piano and keyboards (1972–75)
- Garland Craft – piano (1975–80)
- B James Lowry - lead guitar (1976, 1987-1990)
- Skip Mitchell – guitar (1976–87)
- Marty Glisson – piano (1976)
- Michael Saleem – drums (1979)
- Fred Satterfield – drums (1980–98)
- Pete Cummings – lead guitar (1980–1982)
- Ron Fairchild – piano (1980–2001, 2002–09, 2013–2024; as substitute 2009–2012)
- Dewey Dorough – saxophone, harmonica (1982–1998)
- Paul Uhrig – bass guitar (1987–1988, 1995-1997)
- Dave Watson - bass guitar (1988-1994)
- Kent Wells - lead guitar (1991)
- Don Carr – lead guitar (1991–2014)
- Chris Golden – acoustic guitar, mandolin (1996-1998); drums (1998–2014); also baritone fill-in (2004)
- Jeff Douglas – guitar, dobro (1995–2021)
- Jimmy Fulbright – piano (2001); bass guitar (2003–12)
- Kyle Tullis - bass guitar (2002-2003)
- Ryan Pierce - steel guitar, fiddle (2003)
- Chris Nole – piano (2009–12)
- David Northup – drums, percussion (2014–2017)
- Roger Eaton – lead guitar (2014–2021)
- James Watkins – lead guitar (2021)

== Awards and honors ==
Grammy Awards

Year	Album	Category	Result
1967	The Oak Ridge Boys At Their Best	Best Sacred Performance (Musical)	Nominated
1968	Oak Ridge Boys	Best Gospel Performance	Nominated
1969	A Great Day	Best Gospel Performance	Nominated
1970	It's Happening	Best Gospel Performance	Nominated
1971	Talk About the Good Times	Best Gospel Performance (Other Than Soul Gospel)	Won
1972	Jesus Christ, What a Man!	Best Gospel Performance (Other Than Soul Gospel)	Nominated
1973	Light	Best Gospel Performance (Other Than Soul Gospel)	Nominated
1974	Street Gospel	Best Gospel Performance (Other Than Soul Gospel)	Nominated
1975	"The Baptism of Jesse Taylor"	Best Gospel Performance (Other Than Soul Gospel)	Won
1977	"Where the Soul Never Dies"	Best Gospel Performance (Other Than Soul Gospel)	Won
1978	"Just A Little Talk With Jesus"	Best Gospel Performance, Traditional	Won
1978	"Y’all Come Back Saloon"	Best Country Vocal Performance by a Duo or Group	Nominated
1979	"Cryin’ Again"	Best Country Vocal Performance by a Duo or Group	Nominated
1981	"Heart of Mine"	Best Country Performance by a Duo or Group with Vocal	Nominated
1982	"Elvira"	Best Country Performance by a Duo or Group with Vocal	Won
1983	"Would They Love Him Down in Shreveport"	Best Inspirational Performance	Nominated
1983	Bobbie Sue	Best Country Performance by a Duo or Group with Vocal	Nominated
1984	"American Made"	Best Country Performance by a Duo or Group with Vocal	Nominated
1989	"Gonna Take a Lot of River"	Best Country Performance by a Duo or Group with Vocal	Nominated
2002	From the Heart	Best Southern, Country or Bluegrass Gospel Album	Nominated
2003	An Inconvenient Christmas	Best Southern, Country or Bluegrass Gospel Album	Nominated
2004	"Colors"	Best Country Performance by a Duo or Group with Vocal	Nominated
2006	Common Thread	Best Southern, Country or Bluegrass Gospel Album	Nominated

American Music Awards

- 1982: Best Country Group
- 1985: Best Country Video – "Everyday"

Academy of Country Music Awards

- 1978: Top Vocal Group
- 1979: Top Vocal Group
- 1979: Best Album – Y'all Come Back Saloon
- 1982: Single of the Year – "Elvira"

Country Music Association Awards

- 1978: Instrumental Group of the Year (Oak Ridge Boys Band)
- 1978: Vocal Group of the Year
- 1981: Single of the Year – "Elvira"
- 1986: Instrumental Group of the Year (Oak Ridge Boys Band)

=== Other honors ===
- 2000: Inducted into the Gospel Music Hall of Fame
- 2015: Inducted into the Country Music Hall of Fame
