= T. G. Sheppard discography =

Artist discography

- Studio albums: 23
- Live albums: 1
- Compilation albums: 6
- Singles: 45

The discography of albums and singles released by American country music artist T. G. Sheppard comprises 23 studio albums, six compilation albums, one live album, and 45 singles. Between 1974 and 1991, Sheppard has charted 42 songs on the Billboard Hot Country Songs chart, including 14 that reached number one.

== Albums ==
=== Studio albums ===
Title	Album details	Peak positions		
Title	Album details	US Country	US	CAN Country
T.G. Sheppard	Release year: 1975; Label: Melodyland	12	—	—
Motels and Memories	Release year: 1976; Label: Melodyland	28	—	—
Solitary Man	Release year: 1976; Label: Hitsville	16	—	—
T.G.	Release year: 1978; Label: Curb / Warner Bros.	42	—	—
Daylight	Release year: 1978; Label: Curb / Warner Bros.	—	—	—
3/4 Lonely	Release year: 1979; Label: Curb / Warner Bros.	4	—	8
Smooth Sailin'	Release year: 1980; Label: Curb / Warner Bros.	19	—	—
I Love 'Em All	Release year: 1981; Label: Curb / Warner Bros.	7	119	—
Finally!	Release year: 1982; Label: Curb / Warner Bros.	4	152	—
Perfect Stranger	Release year: 1982; Label: Curb / Warner Bros.	25	—	—
Slow Burn	Release year: 1983; Label: Curb / Warner Bros.	17	204	—
One Owner Heart	Release year: 1984; Label: Curb / Warner Bros.	26	—	—
T.G.	Release year: 1985; Label: Curb / Warner Bros.	54	—	—
Livin' on the Edge	Release year: 1985; Label: Columbia	26	—	—
It Still Rains in Memphis	Release year: 1986; Label: Columbia	26	—	—
One for the Money	Release year: 1987; Label: Columbia	47	—	—
Crossroads	Release year: 1988; Label: Columbia	—	—	—
Nothin' On but the Radio	Release year: 1997; Label: Outwest	—	—	—
Timeless: Classic Love Songs	Release year: 2004; Label: Aspirion	—	—	—
Partners in Rhyme	Release year: 2007; Label: Sheppard	—	—	—
Because You Love Me	Release year: 2012; Label: Mansion Entertainment	—	—	—
T.G. Sheppard & Friends	Release year: 2015; Label: Cleopatra	—	—	—
Midnight in Memphis	Release year: 2019; Label: Leopard Entertainment	—	—	—
"—" denotes releases that did not chart

=== Compilation albums ===
Title	Album details	Peak positions	
Title	Album details	US Country	US
T. G. Sheppard's Greatest Hits	Release year: 1983; Label: Curb / Warner Bros.	5	189
Greatest Hits, Volume II	Release year: 1985; Label: Curb / Warner Bros.	—	—
Biggest Hits	Release year: 1988; Label: Columbia	—	—
All Time Greatest Hits	Release year: 1991; Label: Warner Bros.	—	—
The Best of T.G. Sheppard	Release year: 1992; Label: Curb	—	—
Super Hits Series	Release year: 2000; Label: Warner Bros.	—	—
"—" denotes releases that did not chart

=== Live albums ===
Title	Album details
Live at Billy Bob's Texas	Release year: 2002; Label: Smith Music Group

== Singles ==
=== As lead artist ===
Year	Single	Peak positions					Album
Year	Single	US Country	US	US AC	CAN Country	CAN AC	Album
1974	"Devil in the Bottle"	1	54	—	1	—	T.G. Sheppard
1975	"Tryin' to Beat the Morning Home"	1	95	—	2	—	T.G. Sheppard
1975	"Another Woman"	14	—	—	17	—	T.G. Sheppard
1975	"Motels and Memories"	7	— (Note: "Motels and Memories" did not enter the Hot 100, but peaked at number 2 on Bubbling Under Hot 100 Singles, which acts as a 25-song extension of the Hot 100.)	—	1	—	Motels and Memories
1976	"Solitary Man"	14	100	29	11	24	Solitary Man
1976	"Show Me a Man"	8	—	—	13	—	Solitary Man
1976	"May I Spend Every New Years with You"	37	—	—	—	—	Non-album single
1977	"Lovin' On"	20	—	—	18	—	T. G. (1977)
1977	"Mister D. J."	13	—	—	27	—	T. G. (1977)
1978	"Don't Ever Say Goodbye"	13	—	—	18	—	T. G. (1977)
1978	"When Can We Do This Again"	5	—	—	29	—	Daylight
1978	"Daylight"	7	—	—	9	—	Daylight
1978	"Happy Together"	8	—	—	6	—	Daylight
1979	"You Feel Good All Over"	4	—	—	20	—	3/4 Lonely
1979	"Last Cheater's Waltz"	1	—	—	7	—	3/4 Lonely
1979	"I'll Be Coming Back for More"	1	—	—	23	—	3/4 Lonely
1980	"Smooth Sailin'"	6	—	—	7	—	Smooth Sailin'
1980	"Do You Wanna Go to Heaven"	1	—	—	15	—	Smooth Sailin'
1980	"I Feel Like Loving You Again"	1	—	—	3	—	Smooth Sailin'
1981	"I Loved 'Em Every One"	1	37	3	3	8	I Love 'Em All
1981	"Party Time"	1	—	—	2	—	I Love 'Em All
1981	"Only One You"	1	68	20	1	—	Finally!
1982	"Finally"	1	58	17	10	—	Finally!
1982	"War Is Hell (On the Homefront Too)"	1	—	—	5	—	Perfect Stranger
1982	"Faking Love" (with Karen Brooks)	1	—	—	1	—	Perfect Stranger
1983	"Without You"	12	—	—	10	—	T.G. Sheppard's Greatest Hits
1983	"Slow Burn"	1	—	—	1	—	Slow Burn
1984	"Make My Day" (with Clint Eastwood)	12	62	36	11	—	Slow Burn
1984	"Somewhere Down the Line"	3	—	—	5	—	Slow Burn
1984	"One Owner Heart"	4	—	—	3	—	One Owner Heart
1985	"You're Going Out of My Mind"	10	—	—	8	—	T.G. (1985)
1985	"Fooled Around and Fell in Love"	21	—	—	34	—	Livin' on the Edge
1985	"Doncha?"	8	—	—	5	—	Livin' on the Edge
1985	"In Over My Heart"	9	—	—	28	—	Livin' on the Edge
1986	"Strong Heart"	1	—	—	1	—	It Still Rains in Memphis
1986	"Half Past Forever (Till I'm Blue in the Heart)"	2	—	—	3	—	It Still Rains in Memphis
1987	"You're My First Lady"	2	—	—	5	—	It Still Rains in Memphis
1987	"One for the Money"	2	—	—	2	—	One for the Money
1988	"Don't Say It with Diamonds (Say It with Love)"	48	—	—	63	—	Crossroads
1988	"You Still Do"	14	—	—	—	—	Crossroads
1991	"Born in a High Wind"	63	—	—	—	—	Non-album single
1991	"It's One A.M. (Do You Know Where Your Memories Are)"	—	—	—	—	—	Non-album single
1992	"(Everything I Do) I Do It for You"	—	—	—	—	—	The Best of T.G. Sheppard
2019	"I Wanna Live Like Elvis"	—	—	—	—	—	Midnight in Memphis
"—" denotes releases that did not chart

=== As featured artist ===
Year	Single	Peak positions		Album
Year	Single	US Country	US AC	Album
1984	"Home Again" (Judy Collins with T.G. Sheppard)	57	42	Home Again / One Owner Heart
