= T. G. Sheppard's Greatest Hits =

Greatest hits album by T. G. Sheppard
- Released: 1983
- Genre: Country
- Length: 34:45
- Label: Warner Bros./Curb
- Producer: Buddy Killen

T. G. Sheppard chronology
Perfect Stranger (1982)	T. G. Sheppard's Greatest Hits (1983)	Slow Burn (1983)

T. G. Sheppard's Greatest Hits is the first compilation album by American country music artist T. G. Sheppard. It was released in 1983 via Warner Bros. and Curb Records. The album includes the single "Without You"

== Track listing ==
No.	Title	Writer(s)	Length
1.	"I Loved 'Em Every One"	Phil Sampson	3:40
2.	"Party Time"	Bruce Channel	3:31
3.	"Finally"	Gary Chapman	3:50
4.	"War Is Hell (On the Homefront Too)"	Curly Putman, Bucky Jones, Dan Wilson	3:24
5.	"Without You"	Pete Ham, Tom Evans	4:05
6.	"You Feel Good All Over"	Sonny Throckmorton	3:13
7.	"Last Cheater's Waltz"	Throckmorton	3:43
8.	"I'll Be Coming Back for More"	Sterling Whipple, Putman	2:52
9.	"Do You Wanna Go to Heaven"	Putman, Jones	3:08
10.	"Only One You"	Michael Garvin, Jones	3:19

== Chart performance ==
Chart (1983)	Peak position
US Top Country Albums (Billboard)	5
US Billboard 200	189
