= Finally! (T. G. Sheppard album) =

Studio album by T. G. Sheppard
- Released: 1982
- Genre: Country
- Length: 32:12
- Label: Warner Bros./Curb
- Producer: Buddy Killen

T. G. Sheppard chronology
| I Love 'Em All (1981) | Finally! (1982) | Perfect Stranger (1982) |

Singles from Finally!
- 1. "Only One You" Released: November 1981; 2. "Finally" Released: March 1982

Finally! is the ninth studio album by American country music artist T. G. Sheppard. It was released in 1982 via Warner Bros. and Curb Records. The album includes the singles "Only One You" and "Finally".

== Track listing ==
| No. | Title | Writer(s) | Length |
|---|---|---|---|
| 1. | "Only One You" | Michael Garvin, Bucky Jones | 3:25 |
| 2. | "Finally" | Gary Chapman | 3:52 |
| 3. | "Crazy in the Dark" | Troy Seals, Eddie Setser | 2:54 |
| 4. | "Wasn't It a Short Forever" | Michael W. Smith, Alice Keister | 2:30 |
| 5. | "All My Cloudy Days Are Gone" | Alan Rhody | 2:48 |
| 6. | "In Another Minute" | Curly Putman, Michael Kosser | 2:43 |
| 7. | "We're Walking on Thin Ice" | Hillary Kanter | 3:45 |
| 8. | "You're the First to Last (This Long)" | Ron Hellard, Garvin, Jones | 3:05 |
| 9. | "She's Got Everything (To Make Me Stay)" | Kevin Welch, Mark Paden | 3:17 |
| 10. | "I Wish You Could Have Turned My Head (And Left My Heart Alone)" | Sonny Throckmorton | 3:40 |

== Chart performance ==
| Chart (1982) | Peak position |
|---|---|
| US Top Country Albums (Billboard) | 4 |
| US Billboard 200 | 152 |
