= 3/4 Lonely =

Studio album by T. G. Sheppard
- Released: 1979
- Genre: Country
- Length: 31:26
- Label: Warner Bros./Curb
- Producer: Buddy Killen

T. G. Sheppard chronology
Daylight (1978)	3/4 Lonely (1979)	Smooth Sailin' (1980)

Singles from 3/4 Lonely
- 1. "You Feel Good All Over" Released: April 21, 1979; 2. "Last Cheater's Waltz" Released: August 1979; 3. "I'll Be Coming Back for More" Released: November 1979

3/4 Lonely is the sixth studio album by American country music artist T. G. Sheppard. It was released in 1979 via Warner Bros. and Curb Records. The includes the singles "You Feel Good All Over", "Last Cheater's Waltz" and "I'll Be Coming Back for More".

== Track listing ==
No.	Title	Writer(s)	Length
1.	"You Feel Good All Over"	Sonny Throckmorton	3:15
2.	"I Wish That I Could Hurt That Way Again"	Curly Putman, Rafe Van Hoy, Don Cook	3:14
3.	"My Ship's Coming In"	Bobby Braddock, Van Hoy	3:20
4.	"You Look Like Love"	Red Lane	3:22
5.	"I Came Home to Make Love to You"	Kieran Kane	2:33
6.	"You Do It to Me Every Time"	Putman, Van Hoy, Cook	2:35
7.	"It's Only Love"	Deborah Allen, Van Hoy	3:01
8.	"(She Wanted to Love) Faster Than I Could Dream"	Putman, Alan Rhody	3:24
9.	"I'll Be Coming Back for More"	Sterling Whipple, Putman	2:55
10.	"Last Cheater's Waltz"	Throckmorton	3:47

== Chart performance ==
Chart (1979)	Peak position
US Top Country Albums (Billboard)	4
Canadian RPM Country albums	8
