= One Owner Heart =

One Owner Heart may refer to:

- "One Owner Heart" (song), a 1984 song by T. G. Sheppard
- One Owner Heart (album), a 1985 album by T. G. Sheppard
