= One for the Money (disambiguation) =

One for the Money is an English children's rhyme.

"One for the Money" may also refer to:

- One for the Money (novel), by Janet Evanovich
- One for the Money (musical), a 1939 musical with Gene Kelly
- One for the Money (play), by Warren Manzi

== Film and television ==
- One for the Money (film), a 2012 adaptation of the novel, starring Katherine Heigl
- One for the Money (2002 film), a 2002 television film, starring Lynn Collins
- "One for the Money" (The Golden Girls), an episode of The Golden Girls
- "One for the Money", an episode of Hawaii Five-O

== Music ==
- One for the Money (T. G. Sheppard album), 1987

"One for the Money" (song), the album's title track

- One for the Money (The Whispers album), 1976 album by the Whispers and its title track
- One for the Money, 1997 album by Sheep on Drugs
- "One for the Money", a song by Conway Twitty from I Love You More Today, 1969
- "One for the Money", a song by Escape the Fate from Ungrateful, 2013
- "One for the Money", a song by Horace Brown from Horace Brown, 1996
- "One for the Money", a song by Jesus Jones from Liquidizer, 1989
- "One for the Money", a song by Status Quo from Ain't Complaining, 1988
- "One's 4 da Money", a song by Shyheim from AKA the Rugged Child, 1994
