= Perfect Stranger (T. G. Sheppard album) =

Studio album by T. G. Sheppard
- Released: 1982
- Genre: Country
- Length: 32:21
- Label: Warner Bros./Curb Records
- Producer: Buddy Killen

T. G. Sheppard chronology
Finally! (1982)	Perfect Stranger (1982)	T. G. Sheppard's Greatest Hits (1983)

Singles from Perfect Stranger
- 1. "War is Hell (On the Homefront Too)" Released: July 1982; 2. "Faking Love" Released: October 1982

Perfect Stranger is the tenth studio album by American country music artist T. G. Sheppard. It was released in 1982 via Warner Bros. and Curb Records. The album includes the singles "War Is Hell (On the Homefront Too)" and "Faking Love".

== Track listing ==
Perfect Stranger track listing
No.	Title	Writer(s)	Length
1.	"War Is Hell (On the Homefront Too)"	Curly Putman Bucky Jones, Dan Wilson	3:25
2.	"Back in Your Arms"	Joey Huffman	3:03
3.	"Faking Love" (duet with Karen Brooks)	Matraca Berg, Bobby Braddock	2:52
4.	"Reno and Me"	John Hadley	3:11
5.	"The Sun's Gonna Shine on Me"	T. G. Sheppard, Ron Moore	3:24
6.	"Where Did We Go Right"	Richard Grossman	3:33
7.	"A Pretty Diamond Ring"	Glenn Martin	3:26
8.	"Spare Hearts"	Tom Shapiro, Chris Waters	3:09
9.	"Gonna Keep on Tryin'"	Sterling Whipple	3:32
10.	"Close Brush with Life"	Larry Gatlin	2:45

== Chart performance ==
Chart (1982)	Peak position
US Top Country Albums (Billboard)	25
