= Smooth Sailing =

Smooth Sailing or Smooth Sailin' may refer to:

== Albums ==
- Smooth Sailing (Arnett Cobb album) or the title song (see below), 1960
- Smooth Sailing (Rob Schneiderman album) or the title track, 1990
- Smooth Sailing (Teddy Edwards album), 2003
- Smooth Sailing, by Maysa Leak, 2004
- Smooth Sailin' (The Isley Brothers album), 1987
- Smooth Sailin' (T. G. Sheppard album), 1980

== Songs ==
- "Smooth Sailing" (Queens of the Stone Age song), by Queens of the Stone Age, 2013
- "Smooth Sailing" (Ella Fitzgerald song), a 1951 song composed by Arnett Cobb and recorded by Ella Fitzgerald; from Lullabies of Birdland, 1956
- "Smooth Sailing", by Old Dominion from Old Dominion (album), 2019
- "Smooth Sailin'" (Leon Bridges song), 2015
- "Smooth Sailin'" (Sonny Throckmorton song), 1980
- "Smooth Sailin'", by Jim Weatherly, 1979
- "Smooth Sailin'", by Roscoe from Young Roscoe Philaphornia, 2003

== Other uses ==
- Smooth Sailing, a 1947 short film by Jerry Hopper
- Smooth Sailin', a chocolate bar brand
