= Still Holding On (disambiguation) =

"Still Holding On" is a song by Clint Black

Still Holding On may also refer to:

== Film and TV ==
- Still Holding On: The Legend of Cadillac Jack, the debut film of Cody Linley

== Music ==
- "Still Holding On", a song written by Robert Corbin from The Oak Ridge Boys album Deliver
- "Still Holding On", a 2013 song by Conjure One (featuring Aruna)
