= War Is Hell =

"War is Hell" is a phrase attributed to American Civil War general William Tecumseh Sherman. It may also refer to:

- War Is Hell (comics), a 1973–1975 Marvel Comics series
- War Is Hell (film), a 1961 American war film by Burt Topper
- "War Is Hell (On the Homefront Too)", a 1982 song by T. G. Sheppard
- War Is Hell, a 2004 album by the Warriors
- "War Is Hell", a 2017 song by Ho99o9 from United States of Horror

== See also ==
- "War Is the H-Word", a 2000 episode of Futurama
