= Last Cheater's Waltz (album) =

Studio album by Sonny Throckmorton
- Released: 1978
- Genre: Country
- Label: Mercury
- Producer: Buddy Killen

Sonny Throckmorton chronology
Last Cheater's Waltz (1978)	Southern Train (1986)

Last Cheater's Waltz is the debut album by American country music artist Sonny Throckmorton. It was released in 1978. Its title song reached number 47 on the Hot Country Songs charts that year.

== Singles ==
"Last Cheater's Waltz" was released as a single with "Smooth Sailin'" on the B-side. "I Wish You Could Have Turned My Head (And Left My Heart Alone)" was released as a single with "She Sure Makes Leaving Look Easy" on the B-side (Mercury 55039).

== Critical reception ==
An uncredited review in Cash Box was favorable, stating, "His first outing is a fine blend of up-tempo tunes, ballads, and even a touch of R&B. Production is completely supportive of Sonny's honest, sensitive vocals. Each cut is good, but 'If We're Not Back in Love by Monday' is outstanding for its creativity."

== Track listing ==
All songs written by Sonny Throckmorton; co-writers in parentheses

Side A

1. "I Wish You Could Have Turned My Head (And Left My Heart Alone)"
2. "Last Cheater's Waltz"
3. "I'm Knee Deep in Loving You"
4. "Middle Age Crazy"
5. "She Sure Makes Leavin' Look Easy"

Side B

1. "Smooth Sailin'" (Curly Putman)
2. "If We're Not Back in Love by Monday" (Glenn Martin)
3. "I Feel Like Loving You Again" (Bobby Braddock)
4. "I'm Turning You Loose" (Putman)
5. "Drink It Down, Lady"
