= I Love 'Em All =

Studio album by T. G. Sheppard
- Released: 1981
- Genre: Country
- Length: 35:34
- Label: Warner Bros./Curb
- Producer: Buddy Killen

T. G. Sheppard chronology
Smooth Sailin' (1980)	I Love 'Em All (1981)	Finally! (1982)

Singles from I Love 'Em All
- 1. "I Loved 'Em Every One" Released: March 1981; 2. "Party Time" Released: June 1981

I Love 'Em All is the eighth studio album by American country music artist T. G. Sheppard. It was released in 1981 via Warner Bros. and Curb Records. The album includes the singles "I Loved 'Em Every One" and "Party Time".

== Track listing ==
No.	Title	Writer(s)	Length
1.	"We Belong in Love Tonight"	Mark Paden	3:19
2.	"What's Forever For"	Rafe Van Hoy	3:12
3.	"Party Time"	Bruce Channel	3:32
4.	"Silence on the Line"	Sterling Whipple	4:25
5.	"Touch Me All Over Again"	Jamie O'Hara	2:44
6.	"I Loved 'Em Every One"	Phil Sampson	3:41
7.	"You Waltzed Yourself Right into My Life"	Ron Moore	3:54
8.	"Face the Night Alone"	Curly Putman, Don Cook	3:37
9.	"Troubled Waters"	Chip Hardy, Rick Carnes	3:16
10.	"The State of Our Union"	Hardy, Jim Rushing	3:49

== Chart performance ==
Chart (1981)	Peak position
US Top Country Albums (Billboard)	7
US Billboard 200	119
