= Texas Tornados (album) =

- English version cover

Studio album by Texas Tornados
- Released: August 1990
- Genre: Tex-Mex
- Length: 31:09
- Label: Reprise
- Producer: Texas Tornados, Bill Halverson

Texas Tornados chronology
Los Texas Tornados (1990)	Texas Tornados (1990)	Zone of Our Own (1991)

Los Texas Tornados
- Spanish version cover

Texas Tornados is the debut album by supergroup Texas Tornados, released in August, 1990, through Reprise Records. This album was recorded in both English and Spanish, with Los Texas Tornados being the title of the Spanish version. In 1992, the track "Soy de San Luis", earned the band a Grammy Award for Best Mexican/Mexican-American Album. The track "If That's What You're Thinking" was originally recorded by Karen Brooks in 1982.

== Track listing ==
No.	Title	Writer(s)	Length
1.	"Who Were You Thinkin' Of?"	Cathie Pelletier; Jim Glaser; Paul Gauvin	2:27
2.	"(Hey Baby) Que Paso"	Augie Meyers; Bill Sheffield	2:58
3.	"Laredo Rose"	Rich Minus	3:12
4.	"A Man Can Cry"	Freddy Fender; Wayne Duncan	3:38
5.	"Soy de San Luis"	Santiago Jiménez, Sr.; translated by Louis Ortega	3:46
6.	"Adios Mexico"	Doug Sahm	2:42
7.	"If That's What You're Thinking"	Randy Sharp	3:51
8.	"She Never Spoke Spanish to Me"	Butch Hancock	3:19
9.	"Dinero"	Augie Meyers	2:47
10.	"Baby! Heaven Sent Me to You"	Huey P. Meaux	2:29
Total length:			31:09

Spanish version
No.	Title	Writer(s)	Length
1.	"En Que Pensabas Tu"	Cathie Pelletier; Jim Glaser; Paul Gauvin	2:27
2.	"(Hey Baby) Que Paso"	Augie Meyers, Bill Sheffield	2:58
3.	"Rosa De Amor"	Rich Minus	3:12
4.	"El Hombre Llora"	Freddy Fender, Wayne Duncan	3:38
5.	"Soy de San Luis"	Santiago Jiménez, Sr.	3:46
6.	"Adios Mexico"	Doug Sahm	2:42
7.	"Si Eso Es Lo Que Piensas"	Randy Sharp	3:51
8.	"Bonito Es El Español"	Butch Hancock	3:19
9.	"Dinero"	Augie Meyers	2:47
10.	"El Cielo Un Angel Me Mando"	Huey P. Meaux	2:29
Total length:			31:09

== Charts and certifications ==
=== Weekly charts ===
Chart (1990)	Peak position
US Billboard 200	154
US Top Country Albums (Billboard)	25

=== Year-end charts ===
Chart (1991)	Position
US Top Country Albums (Billboard)	54
