= I Wish You Could Have Turned My Head (And Left My Heart Alone) =

Single by The Oak Ridge Boys

from the album Bobbie Sue
- B-side: "Back in Your Arms Again"
- Released: July 31, 1982
- Genre: Country
- Length: 3:24
- Label: MCA
- Songwriter: Sonny Throckmorton
- Producer: Ron Chancey

The Oak Ridge Boys singles chronology
"So Fine" (1982)	"I Wish You Could Have Turned My Head (And Left My Heart Alone)" (1982)	"Thank God for Kids" (1983)

"I Wish You Could Have Turned My Head (And Left My Heart Alone)" is a song written by Sonny Throckmorton. He was also the first artist to release it, doing so on Last Cheater's Waltz in 1978. His version went to number 54 on the country music chart that year.

Conway Twitty recorded the song on Cross Winds in 1979.

T. G. Sheppard recorded the song in 1982 on Finally!.

The Oak Ridge Boys released it in July 1982 as the third single from Bobbie Sue, peaking at number two.

The posthumous B.W. Stevenson 2013 album Southern Nights includes a cover version.

== Chart performance ==
Chart (1982)	Peak position
US Hot Country Songs (Billboard)	2
Canadian RPM Country Tracks	4
