= Doncha? =

Single by T. G. Sheppard

from the album Livin' on the Edge
- B-side: "Hunger for You"
- Released: September 7, 1985
- Genre: Country
- Length: 4:27
- Label: Columbia
- Songwriter: Walt Aldridge
- Producer: Rick Hall

T. G. Sheppard singles chronology
"Fooled Around and Fell in Love" (1985)	"Doncha?" (1985)	"In Over My Heart" (1985)

"Doncha?" is a song written by Walt Aldridge, and recorded by American country music artist T. G. Sheppard. It was released in September 1985 as the second single from the album Livin' on the Edge. The song reached #8 on the Billboard Hot Country Singles & Tracks chart.

== Chart performance ==
Chart (1985)	Peak position
US Hot Country Songs (Billboard)	8
Canadian RPM Country Tracks	5
