= Soy de San Luis =

Song by Texas Tornados

from the album Texas Tornados
- Released: 1990
- Genre: Tex-Mex, norteño, conjunto
- Length: 3:46
- Label: Reprise
- Songwriters: Santiago Jiménez, Sr., Louis Ortega
- Producer: Texas Tornados

"Soy de San Luis" is a song written by Santiago Jiménez Sr. and Louis Ortega. The song came to prominence in 1990 when American supergroup Texas Tornados recorded it on their album Texas Tornados, earning a Grammy Award for Best Mexican/Mexican-American Performance.

== Track listing ==
Digital download

1. "Soy de San Luis" – 3:46
