= You're Going Out of My Mind =

Single by T. G. Sheppard

from the album T. G.
- B-side: "Heat Lightning"
- Released: March 9, 1985
- Genre: Country
- Length: 3:20
- Label: Warner Bros./Curb
- Songwriter(s): Wayland Holyfield, Jerry McBee
- Producer(s): Jim Ed Norman

T. G. Sheppard singles chronology
"One Owner Heart" (1985)	"You're Going Out of My Mind" (1985)	"Fooled Around and Fell in Love" (1985)

"You're Going Out of My Mind" is a song written by Wayland Holyfield and Jerry McBee, and recorded by American country music artist T. G. Sheppard. Originally recorded for the 1984 album One Owner Heart, it was released in March 1985 as the only single from the album T. G.. The song reached number 10 on the Billboard Hot Country Singles & Tracks chart.

== Chart performance ==
Chart (1985)	Peak position
US Hot Country Songs (Billboard)	10
Canadian RPM Country Tracks	8
