= I Feel Like Loving You Again =

Single by T. G. Sheppard

from the album Smooth Sailin'
- B-side: "Let the Little Bird Fly"
- Released: November 1980
- Genre: Country
- Length: 3:06
- Label: Warner Bros./Curb
- Songwriter(s): Bobby Braddock; Sonny Throckmorton
- Producer(s): Buddy Killen

T. G. Sheppard singles chronology
"Do You Wanna Go to Heaven" (1980)	"I Feel Like Loving You Again" (1980)	"I Loved 'Em Every One" (1981)

"I Feel Like Loving You Again" is a song written by Bobby Braddock and Sonny Throckmorton, and recorded by American country music artist T. G. Sheppard. It was first released in 1978 on Throckmorton's debut album, Last Cheater's Waltz. It was re-released in November 1980 as the third single from Sheppard's album Smooth Sailin'. The song was Sheppard's sixth number one on the country chart. The single stayed at number one for one week and spent a total of ten weeks on the country chart.

== Cover versions ==
John Conlee recorded a version of the song for his 1981 album With Love.

== Charts ==
Chart (1980–1981)	Peak position
US Hot Country Songs (Billboard)	1
Canadian RPM Country Tracks	3
