= Bobbie Sue =

Studio album by the Oak Ridge Boys
- Released: 1982
- Recorded: 1981
- Studio: Woodland (Nashville, Tennessee); FAME (Muscle Shoals, Alabama)
- Genre: Country
- Length: 31:11
- Label: MCA
- Producer: Ron Chancey

The Oak Ridge Boys chronology
Fancy Free (1981)	Bobbie Sue (1982)	Christmas (1982)

Singles from Bobbie Sue
- 1. "Bobbie Sue" Released: 1981; 2. "So Fine" Released: 1982; 3. "I Wish You Could Have Turned My Head (And Left My Heart Alone)" Released: 1982

Professional ratings
Review scores
Source	Rating
The Rolling Stone Album Guide	2/5 stars

Bobbie Sue is the eighth album by the Oak Ridge Boys, released in 1982. The title song was a No. 1 country chart hit and a No. 12 hit on the Hot 100 singles chart.

The album includes cover versions of "So Fine", a song originally by the Fiestas; and "Up on Cripple Creek", originally by the Band.

== Track listing ==
No.	Title	Writer(s)	Length
1.	"Bobbie Sue"	Wood Newton, Dan Tyler, Adele Tyler, Jerry Lieber, Mike Stoller	2:49
2.	"I Wish You Were Here (Oh My Darlin')"	Michael Foster	3:36
3.	"Doctor's Orders"	Rory Bourke, Bruce Channel, Kieran Kane	3:33
4.	"Old Kentucky Song"	Kix Brooks, Ed Hunnicutt	2:37
5.	"So Fine"	Johnny Otis	2:47
6.	"I Wish You Could Have Turned My Head (And Left My Heart Alone)"	Sonny Throckmorton	3:34
7.	"Back in Your Arms Again"	Rusty Golden	2:58
8.	"Up on Cripple Creek"	Robbie Robertson	3:19
9.	"Until You"	Rusty Golden, Jimbeau Hinson	3:14
10.	"Would They Love Him Down in Shreveport?"	Bobby Braddock	2:25

== Personnel ==
The Oak Ridge Boys

- Duane Allen
- Joe Bonsall
- William Lee Golden
- Richard Sterban

Musicians

- Jimmy Capps - acoustic guitar
- Jerry Carrigan - drums, percussion
- Gene Chrisman - drums, percussion
- Farrell Morris - percussion
- Weldon Myrick - steel guitar
- Ron Oates - keyboards
- Billy Sanford - electric guitar, acoustic guitar
- Jack Williams - bass guitar
- Chip Young - acoustic guitar
- Reggie Young - electric guitar

The Muscle Shoals Horns

- Harrison Calloway - trumpet
- Ronnie Eades - baritone saxophone
- Charles Rose - trombone
- Harvey Thompson - tenor saxophone, alto saxophone

Strings arranged by Bergen White

== Chart performance ==
=== Album ===
Chart (1982)	Peak position
U.S. Billboard Top Country Albums	1
U.S. Billboard 200	20
Canadian RPM Top Albums	27

=== Singles ===
Year	Single	Peak chart positions					
Year	Single	US Country	US	US AC	CAN Country	CAN	CAN AC
1982	"Bobbie Sue"	1	12	19	1	20	1
1982	"So Fine"	22	76	—	16	—	—
1982	"I Wish You Could Have Turned My Head (And Left My Heart Alone)"	2	—	—	4	—	—
