= If That's What You're Thinking =

1983 song by Karen Brooks

Single by Karen Brooks

from the album Walk On
- B-side: "Every Beat of My Heart"
- Released: February 1983
- Genre: Country
- Length: 3:25
- Label: Warner
- Songwriter(s): Randy Sharp
- Producer(s): Brian Ahern

Karen Brooks singles chronology
| "Faking Love" (1982) | "If That's What You're Thinking" (1983) | "Walk On" (1983) |

"If That's What You're Thinking" is a song by American country music singer Karen Brooks. It is the second single from her 1982 album Walk On, and it was written by Randy Sharp.

== History ==
Karen Brooks recorded "If That's What You're Thinking" on her 1982 album Walk On. The song features two verses, a refrain, a bridge sung in Spanish, followed by a repeat of the chorus and first verse. Erin E. Bauer, in the book Flaco's Legacy: The Globalization of Conjunto describes the song as being about "fear on the part of the vocalist to express vulnerability in the face of a loving relationship." John Lomax III of United Feature Syndicate described the song as having a "Spanish touch". Brian Ahern produced the track, which was written by Randy Sharp.

Texas Tornados covered the song on their 1990 Reprise Records album Texas Tornados. Their rendition adds a verse not present in the original by Brooks, while also altering the words of the Spanish-language bridge. Bauer thought this rendition combined elements of country and conjunto.

== Charts ==
Weekly chart performance for "If That's What You're Thinking"
| Chart (1983) | Peak position |
|---|---|
| US Hot Country Songs (Billboard) | 21 |
