= Smooth Sailin' (T. G. Sheppard album) =

Studio album by T. G. Sheppard
- Released: 1980
- Genre: Country
- Length: 31:53
- Label: Warner Bros./Curb
- Producer: Buddy Killen

T. G. Sheppard chronology
| 3/4 Lonely (1979) | Smooth Sailin' (1980) | I Love 'Em All (1981) |

Singles from Smooth Sailin'
- 1. "Smooth Sailin" Released: April 5, 1980; 2. "Do You Wanna Go to Heaven" Released: July 1980; 3. "I Feel Like Loving You Again" Released: November 1980

Smooth Sailin' is the seventh studio album by American country music artist T. G. Sheppard. It was released in 1980 via Warner Bros. and Curb Records. The album includes the singles "Smooth Sailin'", "Do You Wanna Go to Heaven", and "I Feel Like Loving You Again".

== Track listing ==
| No. | Title | Writer(s) | Length |
|---|---|---|---|
| 1. | "Do You Wanna Go to Heaven" | Curly Putman, Bucky Jones | 3:10 |
| 2. | "I Never Saw the Light of Day Again" | Jamie O'Hara | 3:32 |
| 3. | "I Feel Like Loving You Again" | Sonny Throckmorton, Bobby Braddock | 3:06 |
| 4. | "I Could Never Dream the Way You Feel" | Kieran Kane | 2:59 |
| 5. | "How Far Our Love Goes" | Putman, Jan Crutchfield, Buddy Killen | 2:53 |
| 6. | "Smooth Sailin'" | Throckmorton, Putman | 3:12 |
| 7. | "My Mind's Already Home" | Throckmorton, Chris Dodson | 2:49 |
| 8. | "Do It Again" | Deborah Allen, Rafe Van Hoy, Roy Culbertson | 3:11 |
| 9. | "Don't Touch Me" | Hank Cochran | 3:11 |
| 10. | "Let the Little Bird Fly" | Putman, Killen | 3:50 |

== Chart performance ==
| Chart (1980) | Peak position |
|---|---|
| US Top Country Albums (Billboard) | 19 |
