= Livin' on the Edge (album) =

Studio album by T. G. Sheppard
- Released: 1985
- Genre: Country
- Length: 35:15
- Label: Columbia
- Producer: Rick Hall

T. G. Sheppard chronology
T. G. (1985)	Livin' on the Edge (1985)	It Still Rains in Memphis (1986)

Singles from Livin' on the Edge
- 1. "Fooled Around and Fell in Love" Released: July 1985; 2. "Doncha?" Released: September 7, 1985; 3. "In Over My Heart" Released: December 28, 1985

Livin' on the Edge is the fourteenth studio album by American country music artist T. G. Sheppard. It was released in 1985 via Columbia Records. The album includes the singles "Fooled Around and Fell in Love", "Doncha?" and "In Over My Heart"

== Track listing ==
No.	Title	Writer(s)	Length
1.	"Doncha?"	Walt Aldridge	4:20
2.	"Crazy in the Heart"	Bob Garfrerick, Billy Henderson	3:16
3.	"Like a Time Bomb"	Roger Murrah	3:29
4.	"Fooled Around and Fell in Love"	Elvin Bishop	3:30
5.	"Love It Out on Me"	Lisa Angelle, Stephen Salyers	3:39
6.	"In Over My Heart"	Aldridge, Tom Brasfield, James Rutledge	3:24
7.	"You're Mine Tonight"	Rafe Van Hoy	3:32
8.	"A Great Work of Art"	Garfrerick, Wayne Counts, Billy Lawson	3:14
9.	"Hunger for You"	Russell Smith, John Hooker	3:48
10.	"Banging My Heart Against the Wall"	Aldridge	2:58

== Chart performance ==
Chart (1986)	Peak position
US Top Country Albums (Billboard)	26
