= Faking Love =

1982 song by T. G. Sheppard and Karen Brooks

Single by T. G. Sheppard and Karen Brooks

from the album Perfect Stranger
- B-side: "Reno and Me"
- Released: October 1982
- Genre: Country
- Length: 2:52
- Label: Warner Bros./Curb
- Songwriter(s): Matraca Berg; Bobby Braddock
- Producer(s): Buddy Killen

T. G. Sheppard singles chronology
"War Is Hell (On the Homefront Too)" (1982)	"Faking Love" (1982)	"Without You" (1983)

Karen Brooks singles chronology
"New Way Out" (1982)	"Faking Love" (1982)	"If That's What You're Thinking" (1983)

"Faking Love" is a song written by Matraca Berg and Bobby Braddock, and recorded by American country music artists T. G. Sheppard and Karen Brooks. It was released in October 1982 as the second single from Sheppard's album Perfect Stranger. The single went to number one for one week and spent a total of thirteen weeks within the Top 40.

== Charts ==
=== Weekly charts ===
Chart (1982–1983)	Peak position
US Hot Country Songs (Billboard)	1
Canadian RPM Country Tracks	1

=== Year-end charts ===
Chart (1983)	Position
US Hot Country Songs (Billboard)	15
