= Christmas (The Oak Ridge Boys album) =

Studio album by The Oak Ridge Boys
- Released: September 23, 1982
- Genre: Country, Christmas
- Label: MCA
- Producer: Ron Chancey

The Oak Ridge Boys chronology
Bobbie Sue (1982)	Christmas (1982)	American Made (1983)

Singles from Christmas
- 1. "Thank God for Kids" Released: November 20, 1982

Professional ratings
Review scores
Source	Rating
allmusic	2.5/5 stars

Christmas is a holiday album released via MCA Records by The Oak Ridge Boys in 1982. It yielded one single in "Thank God for Kids", which hit number three on the Hot Country Songs charts.

== Track listing ==
1. "Jesus Is Born Today (It Is His Birthday)"
2. "Christmas Is Paintin' the Town"
3. "Christmas Carol"
4. "Silver Bells"
5. "Santa's Song"
6. "White Christmas"
7. "Happy Christmas Eve"
8. "Thank God for Kids"
9. "Silent Night"
10. "Little One"
11. "Mary Christmas"
12. "Oh Holy Night"

== Personnel ==
=== Group members ===
- Duane Allen
- Joe Bonsall
- William Lee Golden
- Richard Sterban

=== Other musicians ===
- Jimmy Capps - acoustic guitar
- Gene Chrisman - drums
- Ferrell Morris - percussion
- Steve Nathan - keyboards
- Ron Oates - keyboards
- Cindy Reynolds - harp
- Billy Sanford - acoustic guitar, electric guitar
- Jack Williams - bass guitar
- Reggie Young - electric guitar

Backing vocals

- Dee Allen
- Jamie Allen
- Monica Boulanger
- Jamie Burris
- Melissa Burris
- Julie Horne
- Desiree Ladd
- Teri Martin
- Dale Miller
- Mindy Miller
- Robbie Mitchell
- Ginger Morgan
- Christopher Sterban
- Tara Slate
- Ginna Tarbutton

Horns

- Billy Puett
- Bobby Taylor
- Don Sheffield
- George Tidwell
- Rex Peer
- Roger Bissell

Strings

- George Binkley III
- John David Boyle
- Marvin D. Chantry
- Roy Christensen
- Virginia Christensen
- Margaret Estill
- Lawrence Evans Harvin
- Pauli Ewing
- Daniel Furth
- Carl Gorodetzky
- Lennie Haight
- Phyllis E. Hiltz
- Rebecca Lynch
- Dennis W. Malchan
- Craig Nelson
- Walter Schwede
- Harris Shilakowsky
- Garry Vanosdale
- Pamela Vanosdale

== Chart performance ==
=== Album ===
Chart (1982)	Peak position
U.S. Billboard Top Country Albums	9
U.S. Billboard 200	73

=== Singles ===
Year	Single	Peak positions	
Year	Single	US Country	CAN Country
1982	"Thank God for Kids"	3	24
