= Slow Burn (T. G. Sheppard album) =

Studio album by T. G. Sheppard
- Released: 1983
- Genre: Country
- Length: 36:39
- Label: Warner Bros./Curb
- Producer: Buddy Killen, Jim Ed Norman

T. G. Sheppard chronology
T. G. Sheppard's Greatest Hits (1983)	Slow Burn (1983)	One Owner Heart (1984)

Singles from Slow Burn
- 1. "Slow Burn" Released: September 1983; 2. "Make My Day" Released: February 18, 1984; 3. "Somewhere Down the Line" Released: June 2, 1984

Slow Burn is the eleventh studio album by American country music artist T. G. Sheppard. It was released in 1983 via Warner Bros. and Curb Records. The album includes the singles "Slow Burn", "Make My Day" and "Somewhere Down the Line." "Make My Day" was not included in the initial 1983 album release, which included the song "How Lucky We Are" instead, but the 1984 novelty song with Clint Eastwood was added with a revised release of the album in that year while "How Lucky We Are" was left off of that release, resulting in two versions of the album with slightly different track listings.

== Track listings ==
=== 1983 release ===
No.	Title	Writer(s)	Length
1.	"Somewhere Down the Line"	Lewis Anderson, Casey Kelly	3:11
2.	"Don't Fight the Night"	Tom Shapiro, Chris Waters, Bucky Jones	3:02
3.	"She Put the Sad in All His Songs"	Mac McAnally, Robert Byrne	4:42
4.	"Baby I'm-a Want You"	David Gates	2:31
5.	"Slow Burn"	Tommy Rocco, Charlie Black	4:16
6.	"Blank Check (On My Love)"	Michael Garvin, Jones	2:49
7.	"Arthur and Alice"	Bobby Braddock	3:40
8.	"How Lucky We Are"	Charles Calhoun, Paul Jerry	3:35
9.	"First Things First"	Rafe Van Hoy, Don Cook	2:54
10.	"It's a Bad Night for Good Girls"	Mitch Johnson, Harry Shannon	2:42

=== 1984 release ===
No.	Title	Writer(s)	Length
1.	"Somewhere Down the Line"	Lewis Anderson, Casey Kelly	3:11
2.	"Don't Fight the Night"	Tom Shapiro, Chris Waters, Bucky Jones	3:02
3.	"She Put the Sad in All His Songs"	Mac McAnally, Robert Byrne	4:42
4.	"Baby I'm a Want You"	David Gates	2:31
5.	"Slow Burn"	Tommy Rocco, Charlie Black	4:16
6.	"Blank Check (On My Love)"	Michael Garvin, Jones	2:49
7.	"Arthur and Alice"	Bobby Braddock	3:40
8.	"First Things First"	Rafe Van Hoy, Don Cook	2:54
9.	"It's a Bad Night for Good Girls"	Mitch Johnson, Harry Shannon	2:42
10.	"Make My Day" (duet with Clint Eastwood)	Dewayne Blackwell	3:17

== Charts ==
Chart (1983)	Peak position
US Top Country Albums (Billboard)	17
