= Alabama State Route 65 =

State highway in Alabama, United States

State Route 65

Route information
- Maintained by ALDOT
- Length: 27.540 mi (44.321 km)
- Existed: 1940–present

Major junctions
- South end: US 72 in Paint Rock
- SR 146 in Swaim
- North end: SR 97 at the Tennessee state line north of Francisco

Location
- Country: United States
- State: Alabama
- Counties: Jackson

Highway system
- Alabama State Highway System; Interstate; US; State
← I-65	→ SR 66

State Route 65 (SR 65) is a 27.540-mile-long (44.321 km) state highway in western Jackson County, in the U.S. state of Alabama. The southern terminus of the highway is at an intersection with U.S. Route 72 (US 72) at Paint Rock. The northern terminus of the highway is at the Tennessee state line, north of Francisco. North of the state line, the highway continues as Tennessee State Route 97 (SR 97).

== Route description ==
SR 65 and Tennessee State Route 97 serve as a connecting route between US 72 in northern Alabama and US 64 in Franklin County, Tennessee. From SR 65's southern terminus, the highway is aligned along a two-lane road with numerous curves as it travels through the mountainous regions of northeastern Alabama and southern Tennessee. North of Paint Rock, SR 65 travels through the unincorporated communities of Garth, Trenton, Hollytree, Princeton, Swaim, and Francisco, before it crosses into Tennessee. The route is notable because it travels through the entire length of the Paint Rock valley, a scenic valley in the Cumberland Plateau. This highway is also known as the Curly Putman Highway, named after the songwriter who lived in the northern portion of the valley.

== Major intersections ==
The entire route is in Jackson County.

Location	mi	km	Destinations	Notes
	0.000	0.000	US 72 (SR 2) – Huntsville, Gurley, Paint Rock, Scottsboro	Southern terminus
Swaim	17.543	28.233	SR 146 east – Estillfork	Western terminus of SR 146
	27.540	44.321	SR 97 north – Huntland	Tennessee state line; northern terminus
1.000 mi = 1.609 km; 1.000 km = 0.621 mi
