= You Still Do =

Single by T. G. Sheppard

from the album Crossroads
- B-side: "Something Worth Waiting For"
- Released: October 1988
- Genre: Country
- Length: 2:33
- Label: Columbia
- Songwriter(s): Casey Kelly, Lonnie Wilson
- Producer(s): Bob Montgomery

T. G. Sheppard singles chronology
"Don't Say It with Diamonds" (1988)	"You Still Do" (1988)	"Born in a High Wind" (1991)

"You Still Do" is a song recorded by American country music artist T. G. Sheppard. It was released in October 1988 as the second single from his album Crossroads. The song peaked at number 14 on the Billboard Hot Country Singles chart. The song was written by Casey Kelly and Lonnie Wilson.

== Chart performance ==
Chart (1988–1989)	Peak position
US Hot Country Songs (Billboard)	14
