= Make My Day (T. G. Sheppard and Clint Eastwood song) =

Single by T. G. Sheppard with Clint Eastwood

from the album Slow Burn
- B-side: "How Lucky We Are"
- Released: February 18, 1984
- Genre: Country
- Length: 3:16
- Label: Warner Bros./Curb
- Songwriter(s): Dewayne Blackwell
- Producer(s): Jim Ed Norman

T. G. Sheppard singles chronology
"Slow Burn" (1983)	"Make My Day" (1984)	"Somewhere Down the Line" (1984)

Clint Eastwood singles chronology
"Beers to You" (1980)	"Make My Day" (1984)

"Make My Day" is a novelty song recorded by American country music artist T. G. Sheppard featuring Clint Eastwood. It was released in February 1984 as the second single from Sheppard's 1983 album Slow Burn, although it was not included on the album until a 1984 revised release. The song reached #12 on the Billboard Hot Country Singles & Tracks chart. The song was written by Dewayne Blackwell.

== Content ==
The song describes the activities of Eastwood's film character Harry Callahan, with a variation of Callahan's trademark line "Go ahead, punk. Make my day" as the chorus.

== Chart performance ==
Chart (1984)	Peak position
US Billboard Hot 100	62
US Hot Country Songs (Billboard)	12
Canadian RPM Country Tracks	11
