= Princeton, Alabama =

Unincorporated community in Alabama, United States

- Unincorporated community
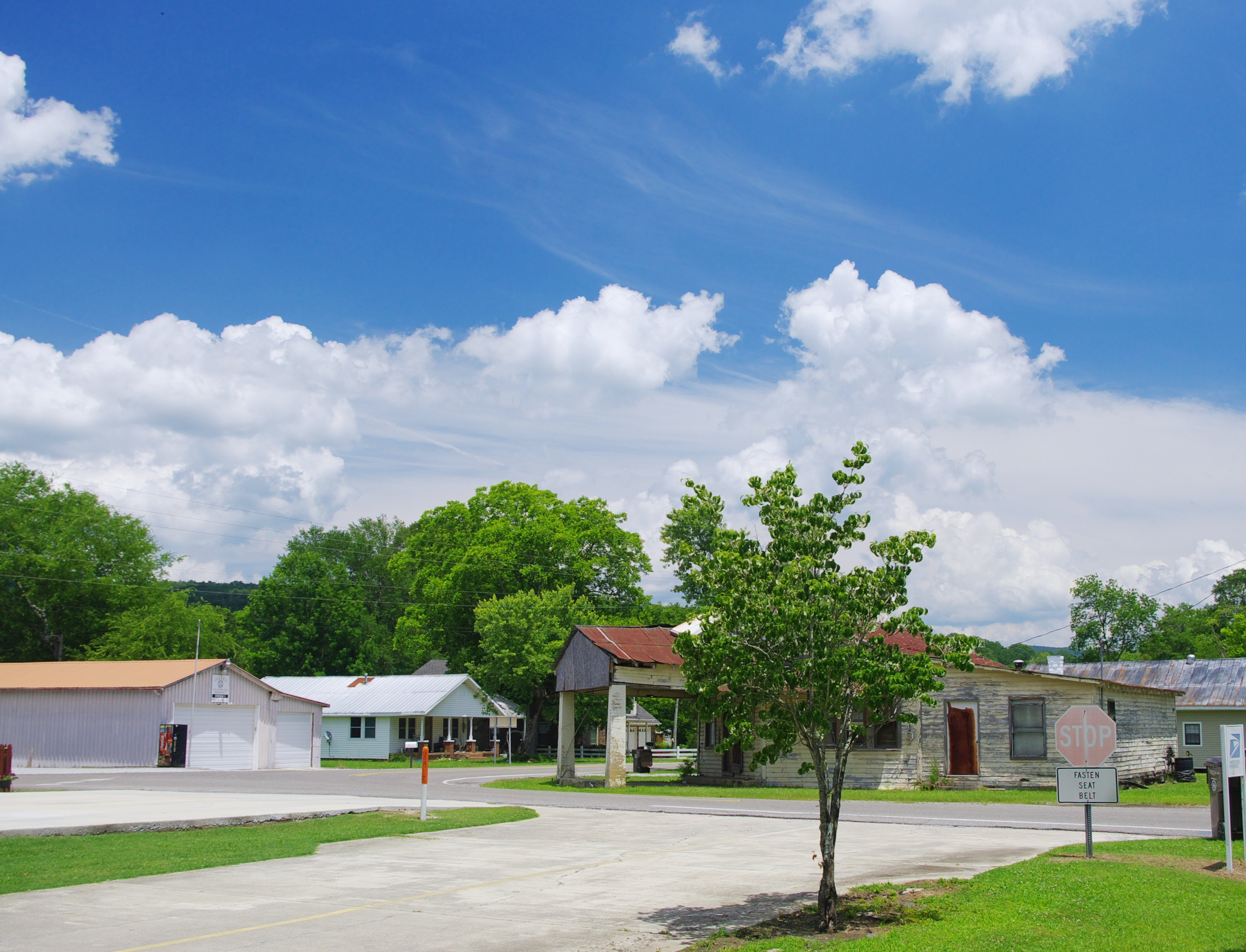
- Buildings along SR 65 in Princeton

- Location within Alabama Location within the United States
- Coordinates: 34°50′36″N 86°14′35″W
- Country: United States
- State: Alabama
- County: Jackson
- Elevation: 646 ft (197 m)
- Time zone: UTC-6 (Central (CST))
  - Summer (DST): UTC-5 (CDT)
- ZIP code: 35766
- Area codes: 256 & 938
- GNIS feature ID: 153067

Princeton is an unincorporated community in Jackson County, Alabama, United States. Princeton is located on Alabama State Route 65 in the upper Paint Rock Valley. Skyline lies just over 7 miles (11 km) miles to the east atop the Cumberland Plateau, and the Alabama–Tennessee state line passes several miles to the north. Princeton has a post office with ZIP code 35766.

== Notable people ==
- Henry Hollis Horton, Governor of Tennessee from 1927 to 1933
- Curly Putman, country music songwriter
