= Trust Your Heart =

Studio album by Judy Collins
- Released: 1987
- Recorded: "The Life You Dream", "Trust Your Heart" and "Moonfall" recorded at Blank Tapes, New York City.
- Genre: Folk, Pop/Rock
- Length: 35:47
- Label: Gold Castle
- Producer: Judy Collins

Judy Collins chronology
Amazing Grace (1985)	Trust Your Heart (1987)	The Stars of Christmas (1988)

Professional ratings
Review scores
Source	Rating
AllMusic	3/5 stars
The Encyclopedia of Popular Music	2/5 stars
The Rolling Stone Album Guide	2.5/5 stars

Trust Your Heart is an album by Judy Collins, released in 1987 by Gold Castle. The album liner notes credit Judy Collins with "overall production". It was released simultaneously with her autobiography of the same name. It is composed of seven of the 16 songs from an album she made for the British label, Telstar, titled Amazing Grace. In addition, she recorded two original songs, Trust Your Heart, and The Life You Dream, as well as a cover of Moonfall from the 1985 Broadway musical, Drood, aka "The Mystery of Edwin Drood".

== Track listing ==
1. "Trust Your Heart" (Judy Collins) – 3:21
2. "Amazing Grace" (John Newton) – 3:50
3. "Jerusalem" (William Blake, Hubert Parry) – 2:19
4. "Day by Day (Godspell)" (Stephen Schwartz, John-Michael Tebelak) – 3:11
5. "The Life You Dream" (Judy Collins) – 5:49
6. "The Rose" (Amanda McBroom) – 5:04
7. "Moonfall" (Rupert Holmes) – 3:30
8. "Morning Has Broken" (Eleanor Farjeon, Cat Stevens) – 2:48
9. "When a Child is Born" (Fred Jay (translator), Ciro Dammicco (alias Zacar)) – 3:23
10. "When You Wish Upon a Star" (Leigh Harline, Ned Washington) – 2:45

== Personnel ==
- Judy Collins – vocals, guitar, keyboards, background vocals
- Warren Odze - drums, percussion
- Shelton Becton - Piano, vocals
- Lou Volpe - Guitar
- Zev Katz - bass

=== Production ===
- Ted Jensen at Sterling Sound, NYC - mastering
