= American Made (The Oak Ridge Boys album) =

Studio album by Oak Ridge Boys
- Released: January 20, 1983
- Genre: Country
- Length: 36:34
- Label: MCA
- Producer: Ron Chancey

Oak Ridge Boys chronology
Christmas (1982)	American Made (1983)	Deliver (1983)

Singles from American Made
- 1. "American Made" Released: February 1983; 2. "Love Song" Released: June 4, 1983

American Made is the ninth album by The Oak Ridge Boys, released in 1983. It featured yet another "crossover hit" with the song "American Made", which hit #1 on the country charts (on April 23, 1983) and #72 on the U.S. Hot 100 singles chart.

== Track listing ==
No.	Title	Writer(s)	Length
1.	"Love Song"	Steve Runkle	3:51
2.	"She's Not Just Another Pretty Face"	Sam Lorber, JD Martin	3:26
3.	"Amity"	Doug Flett, Guy Fletcher	3:47
4.	"You're the One"	Rock Killough	3:49
5.	"Down the Hall"	Mike Reid, Troy Seals	3:21
6.	"American Made"	Bob DiPiero, Pat McManus	2:42
7.	"Any Old Time You Choose"	Ken Bell, Terry Skinner, JL Wallace	3:54
8.	"Heart on the Line (Operator, Operator)"	Janet Willoughby, Larry Willoughby	3:07
9.	"You Made It Beautiful"	Richard Kerr, Troy Seals	3:24
10.	"I'm So Glad I'm Standing Here Today"	Will Jennings, Joe Sample	5:46

== Personnel ==
As listed in liner notes.

=== The Oak Ridge Boys ===
- Duane Allen
- Joe Bonsall
- William Lee Golden
- Richard Sterban

=== Musicians ===
- Barry Beckett - keyboards
- Mickey Buckins - percussion
- Jimmy Capps - acoustic guitar
- Gene Chrisman - drums, percussion
- Lloyd Green - steel guitar
- Roger Hawkins - drums
- David Hood - bass guitar
- Jimmy Johnson - electric guitar
- Kenneth Lovelace - fiddle
- Steve Nathan - keyboards, synthesizer
- Ron Oates - keyboards
- Wayne Perkins - electric guitar, acoustic guitar
- Billy Sanford - electric guitar, mandolin
- Bobby Thompson - banjo
- Jack Williams - bass guitar
- Chip Young - acoustic guitar
- Reggie Young - electric guitar
- The Nashville Hornworks - horns

== Production ==
- Produced By Ron Chancey
- Engineer & Mixing: Les Ladd
- Assistant Engineers: Ken Corlew, Ken Criblez, Tim Farmer, Pete Greene, Russ Martin, David McKinley, Mary Beth McLemore

== Chart performance ==
=== Album ===
Chart (1983)	Peak position
U.S. Billboard Top Country Albums	2
U.S. Billboard 200	51

=== Singles ===
Year	Single	Peak chart positions		
Year	Single	US Country	US	CAN Country
1983	"American Made"	1	72	12
1983	"Love Song"	1	—	1
