= Amazing Grace (Judy Collins album) =

Studio album by Judy Collins
- Released: 1985
- Studio: Olympic, Barnes, England
- Genre: Folk, pop/rock
- Length: 56:08
- Label: Telstar
- Producer: Tony Britten, Keith Grant, Judy Collins

Judy Collins chronology
Home Again (1984)	Amazing Grace (1985)	Trust Your Heart (1987)

Professional ratings
Review scores
Source	Rating
AllMusic	link
The Encyclopedia of Popular Music	3/5 stars

Amazing Grace is an album by Judy Collins, released in 1985 by the UK record label Telstar. It was her first album after ending her 24-year association with Elektra and was recorded and released in 1985 in the UK as a Christmas offering. It has only been available in the United States as an import, although seven of the tracks can be found on her 1987 US release from Gold Castle, Trust Your Heart.

At 16 tracks and nearly an hour in duration, this was Collins' longest album to date. It is the first album the artist had released where she has recorded covers of songs that could be considered the "signature songs" of several other artists, including Simon and Garfunkel, Joni Mitchell, Bette Midler and Cat Stevens.

== Track listing ==
1. "Amazing Grace" (John Newton) – 3:53
2. "Day by Day" (Godspell) (Stephen Schwartz, John-Michael Tebelak) – 3:14
3. "Bridge Over Troubled Water" (Paul Simon) – 4:32
4. "I Don't Know How To Love Him" (Jesus Christ Superstar) (Tim Rice, Andrew Lloyd Webber) – 3:50
5. "Both Sides Now" (Joni Mitchell) – 3:32
6. "Abide With Me" (Henry Francis Lyte, William Henry Monk) – 3:05
7. "Just a Closer Walk with Thee" (Traditional) – 3:27
8. "When You Wish Upon a Star" (Leigh Harline, Ned Washington) – 2:47
9. "When a Child is Born" (Fred Jay (translator), Ciro Dammicco (alias Zacar)) – 3:23
10. "The Rose" (Amanda McBroom) – 5:08
11. "One Day at a Time" (Kris Kristofferson, Marijohn Wilkin) – 3:46
12. "Oh Happy Day" (Edwin Hawkins) – 3:32
13. "Morning Has Broken" (Eleanor Farjeon, Cat Stevens) – 2:48
14. "Send in the Clowns" (Stephen Sondheim) – 4:08
15. "The Lord is my Shepherd" – 2:44
16. "Jerusalem" (William Blake, Hubert Parry) – 2:19

== Personnel ==
- Judy Collins – vocals, guitar, keyboards, background vocals, arrangements
- Christopher Warren-Green – violin solo
- Stephen Hill Singers – vocals
- Trinity Boys Choir – vocals
- United Kingdom Symphony Orchestra – background orchestral music
- Tony Britten – conductor, arrangements
- Rolf Wilson – orchestra leader
- Roy Gillard – orchestra leader
- Eric Knight – arrangements
- Shelton Knight – arrangements
- Jonathan Tunick – arrangements

== Charts ==
Chart performance for Amazing Grace
Chart (1985)	Peak position
Australian Albums (Kent Music Report)	85
UK Albums (OCC)	34
