= Smooth Sailin' (Sonny Throckmorton song) =

Single by T. G. Sheppard

from the album Smooth Sailin'
- B-side: "I Came Home to Make Love to You"
- Released: April 5, 1980
- Genre: Country
- Length: 3:14
- Label: Warner Bros./Curb
- Songwriter(s): Sonny Throckmorton, Curly Putman
- Producer(s): Buddy Killen

T. G. Sheppard singles chronology
| "I'll Be Coming Back for More" (1979) | "Smooth Sailin'" (1980) | "Do You Wanna Go to Heaven" (1980) |

"Smooth Sailin" is a song co-written by Curly Putman and Sonny Throckmorton. Connie Smith released this song as a single on Monument Records in 1978 that peaked at No. 68 on the U.S. Hot Country Songs list.. Throckmorton also released this song on his 1978 debut album, Last Cheater's Waltz. His version was re-released in 1979 on Mercury Records as a double-A-side with "Last Cheater's Waltz". This double-sided single peaked at number 47 on the country music charts that year.

T. G. Sheppard then covered this song on his 1980 album of the same name. Sheppard's version was the most successful and went to number six on the same chart in 1980.

== Charts ==
=== Weekly charts ===
| Chart (1980) | Peak position |
|---|---|
| US Hot Country Songs (Billboard) | 6 |
| Canadian RPM Country Tracks | 7 |

=== Year-end charts ===
| Chart (1980) | Position |
|---|---|
| US Hot Country Songs (Billboard) | 39 |
