= Louie and the Lovers =

American rock band

- Origin: Salinas, California, U.S.
- Genres: Rock
- Labels: Epic Records
- Past members: Louie Ortega; Frank Paredes; Steve Vargas; Albert Parra

Louie and the Lovers was an American rock band based in Salinas, California.

== History ==
While still in high school, the group (then known as Country Fresh) was discovered by Doug Sahm and his wife Violet Sahm; Doug went on to produce the group's debut album. This album, Rise, was released on Epic Records in 1970, but sold poorly. Reviewing it in Christgau's Record Guide (1981), Robert Christgau wrote:

Doug Sahm produced these four young Chicanos from Salinas, and they share his uncomplicated commitment to the pleasure of making music with a good beat. Even more than Sahm, though, they're influenced by the ballroom—leader Louis Ortega's sincere, one-dimensional lyricism harks back to early Airplane and Dead, as does the band's flowing, literally laid-back 4/4. Good lyrics, too. Inspirational Verse: "Once you said you loved me baby/Now I cry for that one time."

The group recorded a second album for Epic (later re-recorded with Atlantic Records) which was never released, and Louie and the Lovers disbanded soon after. Lead singer and songwriter Louie Ortega continued performing with Sahm after the group's breakup, later playing with the Sir Douglas Quintet and the Texas Tornados.

Long out of print, Rise was reissued on CD by Acadia Records in 2003, and in 2009, Bear Family Records reissued the band's shelved sophomore album, packaged as part of a complete recordings compilation.

== Members ==
- Louie Ortega (vocals)
- Frank Paredes (guitar)
- Steve Vargas (bass)
- Albert Parra (drums)
