= American Made (song) =

Single by The Oak Ridge Boys

from the album American Made
- B-side: "The Cure for My Broken Heart"
- Released: February 1983
- Genre: Country
- Length: 2:42
- Label: MCA
- Songwriters: Bob DiPiero; Pat McManus
- Producer: Ron Chancey

The Oak Ridge Boys singles chronology
"Thank God for Kids" (1982)	"American Made" (1983)	"Love Song" (1983)

"American Made" is a song written by Bob DiPiero and Pat McManus, and recorded by The Oak Ridge Boys. It was released in February 1983 as the first single and title track from American Made. It was The Oak Ridge Boys' seventh number one on the country chart, staying at number one for a week. It spent a total of thirteen weeks on the country chart. "American Made” also reached number 72 on the Hot 100.

== Chart performance ==
Chart (1983)	Peak position
US Hot Country Songs (Billboard)	1
US Billboard Hot 100	72
Canadian RPM Country Tracks	12

== In popular culture ==
"American Made" was later made into a TV commercial jingle for Miller Beer, with the line in the song's chorus being changed from "My baby is American made" to "Miller's made the American way." The Oak Ridge Boys did not sing in the ad.
