= Hollytree, Alabama =

Unincorporated community in Alabama, United States

- Unincorporated community
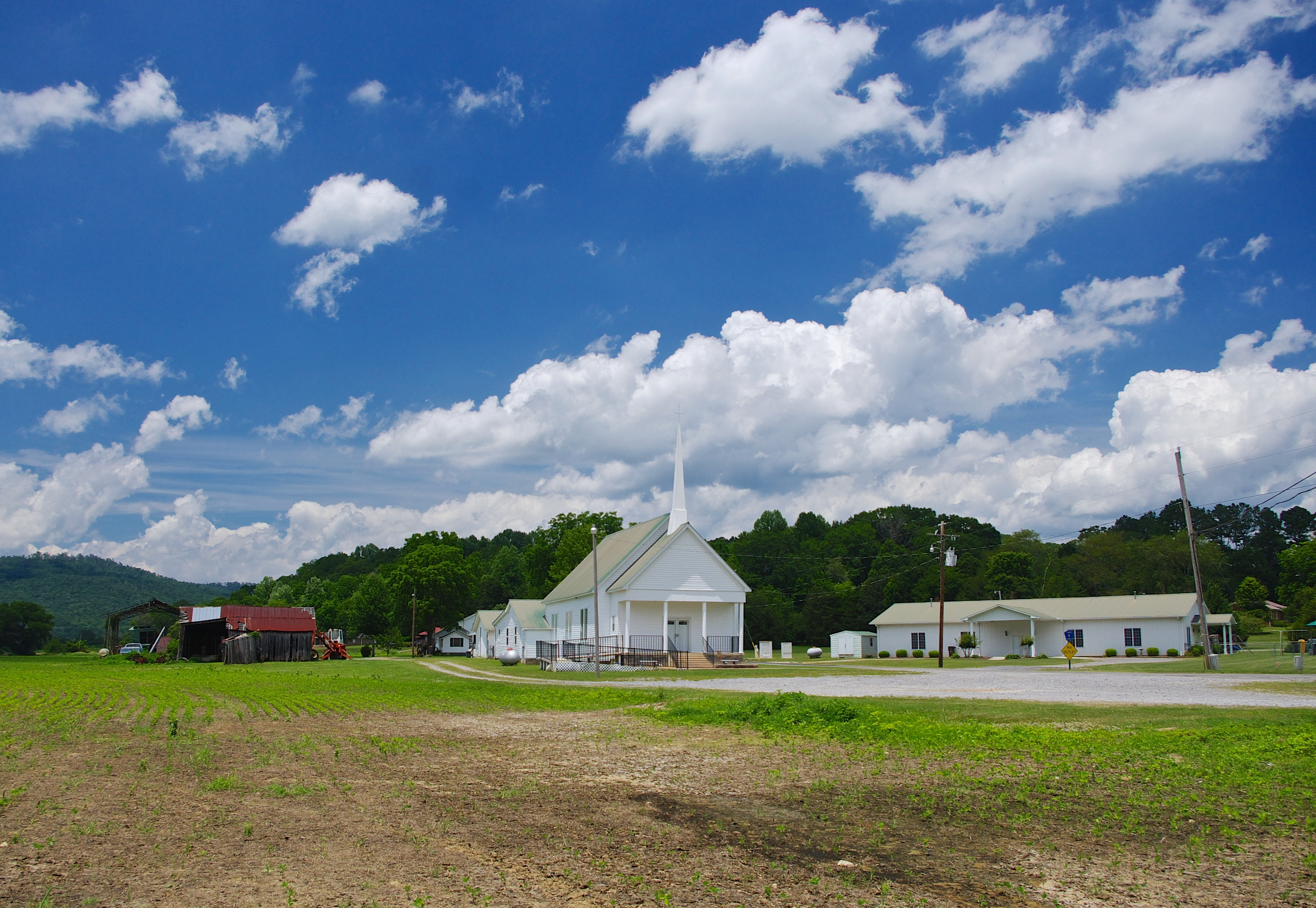
- Mount Nebo Baptist Church in Hollytree

- Location within Alabama Location within the United States
- Coordinates: 34°47′56″N 86°15′12″W
- Country: United States
- State: Alabama
- County: Jackson
- Elevation: 669 ft (204 m)
- Time zone: UTC-6 (Central (CST))
  - Summer (DST): UTC-5 (CDT)
- ZIP code: 35751
- Area codes: 256 & 938
- GNIS feature ID: 156488

Hollytree is an unincorporated community in Jackson County, Alabama, United States. It is located on Alabama State Route 65, 9.7 miles (15.6 km) northeast of Gurley in the Paint Rock Valley. Hollytree has a post office with ZIP code 35751.
