= It Still Rains in Memphis =

Studio album by T. G. Sheppard
- Released: May 21, 1986
- Recorded: 1985
- Genre: Country
- Length: 36:46
- Label: Columbia
- Producer: Rick Hall

T. G. Sheppard chronology
Livin' on the Edge (1985)	It Still Rains in Memphis (1986)	One for the Money (1987)

Singles from It Still Rains in Memphis
- 1. "Strong Heart" Released: May 1986; 2. "Half Past Forever (Till I'm Blue in the Heart)" Released: October 11, 1986; 3. "You're My First Lady" Released: March 21, 1987

It Still Rains in Memphis is the fifteenth studio album by American country music artist T. G. Sheppard. It was released in 1986 via Columbia Records. The includes the singles "Strong Heart", "Half Past Forever (Till I'm Blue in the Heart)" and "You're My First Lady"

== Track listing ==
No.	Title	Writer(s)	Length
1.	"It Still Rains in Memphis"	Mike Reid, Naomi Martin	3:39
2.	"Love Is on a Fade"	Stephen Allen Davis, Dennis Morgan	4:08
3.	"You're My First Lady"	Mac McAnally	3:24
4.	"Paintin' the Town Blue"	Bob Garfrerick, Don Parsons, Steven Dale Jones	3:58
5.	"The Bad Thing About Good Love"	Walt Aldridge, Billy Henderson, Waylon Caylor	4:11
6.	"Movin and Shakin' on Business Street"	Roger Murrah, Steve Dean	3:35
7.	"Half Past Forever (Till I'm Blue in the Heart)"	Robert Byrne, Tom Brasfield	3:36
8.	"She Don't Think Much of Me Anymore"	Mike McGuire, Bud McGuire, Billy Maddox	3:40
9.	"Strong Heart"	Tommy Rocco, Charlie Black, Austin Roberts	3:32
10.	"What You Gonna Do About Her"	McAnally, Gary Baker, Quentin Powers	3:05

== Chart performance ==
Chart (1986)	Peak position
US Top Country Albums (Billboard)	26
