= You're My First Lady =

Single by T. G. Sheppard

from the album It Still Rains in Memphis
- B-side: "Paintin' the Town Blue"
- Released: March 21, 1987
- Genre: Country
- Length: 3:27
- Label: Columbia
- Songwriter: Mac McAnally
- Producer: Rick Hall

T. G. Sheppard singles chronology
"Half Past Forever (Till I'm Blue in the Heart)" (1986)	"You're My First Lady" (1987)	"One for the Money" (1987)

"You're My First Lady" is a song written by Mac McAnally, and recorded by American country music artist T. G. Sheppard. It was released in March 1987 as the third single from the album It Still Rains in Memphis. The song reached #2 on the Billboard Hot Country Singles & Tracks chart.

== Chart performance ==
Chart (1987)	Peak position
US Hot Country Songs (Billboard)	2
Canadian RPM Country Tracks	5
