= Thank God for Kids =

Single by The Oak Ridge Boys

from the album Christmas
- B-side: "Christmas Is Paintin' the Town"
- Released: November 20, 1982
- Genre: Country
- Length: 2:33
- Label: MCA
- Songwriter: Eddy Raven
- Producer: Ron Chancey

The Oak Ridge Boys singles chronology
"I Wish You Could Have Turned My Head (And Left My Heart Alone)" (1982)	"Thank God for Kids" (1982)	"American Made" (1983)

"Thank God for Kids" is a song written by Eddy Raven. It was released as the b-side to his 1976 single "The Curse of a Woman". It was later included on the 1984 MCA Records album of the same name.

It was later recorded by The Oak Ridge Boys, as the only single from their 1982 Christmas album. The song spent sixteen weeks on the Hot Country Songs charts and peaked at number three. They later covered it on their albums Country Christmas Eve in 1995 and Colors in 2003.

In 2004, Kenny Chesney covered the song on All I Want for Christmas Is a Real Good Tan. His version spent one week at number 60 on the country singles chart. In 2011, John Rich covered it on For the Kids.

Raven wrote the song in 1973 after his son said he wanted to help his father write a song about Mickey Mouse or Big Bird; both characters are referenced in the song ("We'd all live in a quiet house/Without Big Bird or Mickey Mouse...").

== Chart performance ==
=== The Oak Ridge Boys ===
Chart (1982–1983)	Peak position
U.S. Billboard Hot Country Singles	3
Canadian RPM Country Tracks	24

=== Kenny Chesney ===
Chart (2004)	Peak position
US Hot Country Songs (Billboard)	60
