= You Feel Good All Over =

Single by T. G. Sheppard

from the album 3/4 Lonely
- B-side: "I Wish That I Could Hurt That Way Again"
- Released: April 21, 1979
- Genre: Country
- Length: 3:16
- Label: Warner Bros/Curb
- Songwriter(s): Sonny Throckmorton
- Producer(s): Buddy Killen

T. G. Sheppard singles chronology
"Happy Together" (1979)	"You Feel Good All Over" (1979)	"Last Cheater's Waltz" (1979)

"You Feel Good All Over" is a song written by Sonny Throckmorton, and recorded by American country music artist T. G. Sheppard. It was released in April 1979 as the first single from the album 3/4 Lonely. The song reached #4 on the Billboard Hot Country Singles & Tracks chart.

== Charts ==
=== Weekly charts ===
Chart (1979)	Peak position
US Hot Country Songs (Billboard)	4
Canadian RPM Country Tracks	20

=== Year-end charts ===
Chart (1979)	Position
US Hot Country Songs (Billboard)	46
