= I Guess It Never Hurts to Hurt Sometimes =

Single by The Oak Ridge Boys

from the album Deliver
- B-side: "Through My Eyes"
- Released: February 25, 1984
- Genre: Country
- Length: 4:01
- Label: MCA
- Songwriter: Randy VanWarmer
- Producer: Ron Chancey

The Oak Ridge Boys singles chronology
"Ozark Mountain Jubilee" (1983)	"I Guess It Never Hurts to Hurt Sometimes" (1984)	"Everyday" (1984)

"I Guess It Never Hurts to Hurt Sometimes" is a song written and originally recorded by Randy VanWarmer on his album Beat of Love. It was covered by The Oak Ridge Boys in 1983 and released as the second single from Deliver. The song was The Oak Ridge Boys' ninth number one on the country chart. The single stayed at number one for one week and spent a total of twelve weeks on the country chart.

== Background ==
Randy VanWarmer wrote the song following the death of his father. While The Oak Ridge Boys' music video depicts the end of a romantic relationship, Joe Bonsall said he preferred the original intent and named it his favorite song to sing on stage.

== Music video ==
The music video was filmed at the old WSM Radio studios in Nashville. Charlie Chase is seen briefly in the hallway. The disc jockey at the end of the video is Lorrie Morgan.

== Charts ==
=== Weekly charts ===
Chart (1984)	Peak position
US Hot Country Songs (Billboard)	1
Canadian RPM Country Tracks	1

=== Year-end charts ===
Chart (1984)	Position
US Hot Country Songs (Billboard)	24
