= Half Past Forever (Till I'm Blue in the Heart) =

Single by T. G. Sheppard

from the album It Still Rains in Memphis
- B-side: "The Bas Thing About Good Love"
- Released: October 11, 1986
- Genre: Country
- Length: 3:34
- Label: Columbia
- Songwriters: Robert Byrne, Tom Brasfield
- Producer: Rick Hall

T. G. Sheppard singles chronology
"Strong Heart" (1986)	"Half Past Forever (Till I'm Blue in the Heart)" (1986)	"You're My First Lady" (1987)

"Half Past Forever (Till I'm Blue in the Heart)" is a song written by Robert Byrne and Tom Brasfield, and recorded by American country music artist T.G. Sheppard. It was released in October 1986 as the second single from the album It Still Rains in Memphis. The song reached #2 on the Billboard Hot Country Singles & Tracks chart.

== Charts ==
=== Weekly charts ===
Chart (1986–1987)	Peak position
US Hot Country Songs (Billboard)	2
Canadian RPM Country Tracks	3

=== Year-end charts ===
Chart (1987)	Position
US Hot Country Songs (Billboard)	2
