= Ozark Mountain Jubilee =

Single by The Oak Ridge Boys

from the album Deliver
- B-side: "Down Deep Inside"
- Released: October 22, 1983
- Genre: Country
- Length: 3:20
- Label: MCA
- Songwriters: Scott Anders, Roger Murrah
- Producer: Ron Chancey

The Oak Ridge Boys singles chronology
"Love Song" (1983)	"Ozark Mountain Jubilee" (1983)	"I Guess It Never Hurts to Hurt Sometimes" (1984)

"Ozark Mountain Jubilee" is a song written by Scott Anders and Roger Murrah and recorded by The Oak Ridge Boys. It was released in October 1983 as the first single from Deliver. The song reached #5 on the Billboard Hot Country Singles & Tracks chart.

== Chart performance ==
Chart (1983–1984)	Peak position
US Hot Country Songs (Billboard)	5
Canadian RPM Country Tracks	1
