= In Over My Heart =

Single by T. G. Sheppard

from the album Livin' on the Edge
- B-side: "A Great Work of Art"
- Released: December 28, 1985
- Genre: Country
- Length: 3:17
- Label: Columbia
- Songwriters: Walt Aldridge, Tom Brasfield, James Rutledge
- Producer: Rick Hall

T. G. Sheppard singles chronology
"Doncha?" (1985)	"In Over My Heart" (1985)	"Strong Heart" (1986)

"In Over My Heart" is a song written by Walt Aldridge, Tom Brasfield and James Rutledge, and recorded by American country music artist T. G. Sheppard. It was released in December 1985 as the third single from the album Livin' on the Edge. The song reached #9 on the Billboard Hot Country Singles & Tracks chart.

== Chart performance ==
Chart (1985–1986)	Peak position
US Hot Country Songs (Billboard)	9
Canadian RPM Country Tracks	28
