= Love Song (The Oak Ridge Boys song) =

Single by The Oak Ridge Boys

from the album American Made
- B-side: "Heart on the Line (Operator, Operator)"
- Released: June 4, 1983
- Genre: Country
- Length: 3:53
- Label: MCA
- Songwriter: Steven Runkle
- Producer: Ron Chancey

The Oak Ridge Boys singles chronology
"American Made" (1983)	"Love Song" (1983)	"Ozark Mountain Jubilee" (1983)

"Love Song" is a song written by Steven Runkle, and recorded by The Oak Ridge Boys. It was released in June 1983 as the second single from American Made. It was The Oak Ridge Boys' eighth number one country single. It stayed at number one for one week and spent a total of twelve weeks on the country chart.

== Charts ==
=== Weekly charts ===
Chart (1983)	Peak position
US Hot Country Songs (Billboard)	1
Canadian RPM Country Tracks	1

=== Year-end charts ===
Chart (1983)	Position
US Hot Country Songs (Billboard)	27
