= Times of Our Lives =

Studio album by Judy Collins
- Released: February 1982
- Recorded: 1981
- Studios: Skyline Studios (New York City); A&R Studios (New York City)
- Genre: Folk
- Label: Elektra
- Producers: Judy Collins; Lew Hahn

Judy Collins chronology
Running for My Life (1980)	Times of Our Lives (1982)	Home Again (1984)

Professional ratings
Review scores
Source	Rating
AllMusic	3.5/5 stars
The Encyclopedia of Popular Music	2/5 stars
The Rolling Stone Album Guide	2.5/5 stars

Times of Our Lives is the fourteenth studio album by American singer-songwriter Judy Collins, released in February 1982 by Elektra Records. It peaked at No. 190 on the Billboard Pop Albums charts. In 1981, prior to the album's release, Collins appeared on the CBS soap opera Guiding Light, performing two songs from the (then) forthcoming album: "Great Expectations" and "It's Gonna Be One of Those Nights" (both having penned by Hugh Prestwood).

The single of "Memory" by Andrew Lloyd Webber from the West End musical Cats was the earliest released version of the song by a singer (apart from its London Cast Album). It was quickly followed by a version by Barbra Streisand.

== Track listing ==
Side one

1. "Great Expectations" (Hugh Prestwood) – 3:54
2. "The Rest of Your Life" (Judy Collins) – 4:43
3. "Grandaddy" (Collins) – 3:24
4. "It's Gonna Be One of Those Nights" (Hugh Prestwood) – 3:38
5. "Memory" (T. S. Eliot, Andrew Lloyd Webber, Trevor Nunn) – 4:13

Side two

1. "Sun Son" (Anna McGarrigle) – 4:18
2. "Mama Mama" (Collins) – 3:38
3. "Drink a Round to Ireland" (Hugh Prestwood) – 3:48
4. "Angel on My Side" (Collins) – 4:31
5. "Don't Say Goodbye Love" (Collins) – 4:39

== Personnel ==
- Judy Collins – vocals, guitar, piano; arrangement and conductor on "Don't Say Goodbye Love"
- Hugh McCracken – acoustic and electric guitar, mandolin
- Steve Khan – electric guitar
- Tony Levin – bass guitar
- Randy Kerber – piano, Fender Rhodes, Prophet-5, CS80 and Omni synthesizer, Omni strings
- Vinnie Colaiuta – drums
- Jimmy Madison – drums
- Rubens Bassini – percussion, congas
- Richard Rimbaugh – drums, tabla, tambourine, finger cymbals
- George Marge – oboe
- Dominic Cortese – accordion
- Margaret Ross – harp
- Max Pollikoff – violin
- Eddie Daniels – alto saxophone
- Bill Keith – banjo
- Dick Hyman – celesta, piano
- Ken Bichel – piano
- Lew Hahn – Casiotone MT30
- Gordon Grody, Shelton Becton, Ula Hedwig – backing vocals
- Cengiz Yaltkaya – arrangement and conductor on "The Rest of Your Lives", "Sun Son", "Mama Mama" and "Angel On My Side"
- Jonathan Tunick – arrangement and conductor on "Grandaddy" and "Drink a Round to Ireland"
- Arif Mardin – arrangement and conductor on "It's Gonna Be One of Those Nights"
- William David Brohn – arrangement and conductor on "Memory"
- David Nadien – concertmaster

Technical

- Arif Mardin – executive producer
- Jim Houghton – photography

== Charts ==
Chart performance for Times of Our Lives
Chart (1982)	Peak position
US Top LPs & Tape (Billboard)	190
US Top 101 to 200 Albums (Cash Box)	178
