= Francisco, Alabama =

Unincorporated community in Alabama, United States

- Unincorporated community
- Location within Alabama Location within the United States
- Coordinates: 34°59′14″N 86°14′57″W
- Country: United States
- State: Alabama
- County: Jackson
- Elevation: 771 ft (235 m)
- Time zone: UTC-6 (Central (CST))
  - Summer (DST): UTC-5 (CDT)
- Area code: 256
- GNIS feature ID: 156378

Francisco is an unincorporated community in northern Jackson County, Alabama, United States. It is located on Alabama State Route 65, 19.1 miles (30.7 km) northwest of Skyline.

== History ==
Francisco is named in honor of Francisco Rice, who served in the Confederate Army and as a member of the Alabama Senate. A post office operated under the name Francisco from 1875 to 1957.
