= Zone of Our Own =

Studio album by Texas Tornados
- Released: 1991
- Genre: Tex-Mex
- Label: Reprise
- Producer: Bill Halverson, Texas Tornados

Texas Tornados chronology
Texas Tornados (1991)	Zone of Our Own (1991)	Hangin' on by a Thread (1992)

Zone of Our Own is an album by the American supergroup Texas Tornados, released in 1991. The first two singles were "Is Anybody Goin' to San Antone" and "La Mucura". Videos for the singles were shot in San Antonio.

The album was nominated for a Grammy Award for "Best Country Performance by a Duo or Group with Vocal".

== Production ==
The album was produced by Bill Halverson and the band. The members often recorded separately, which they determined that they didn't like. "El Pantalon Blue Jean" was written by the father of Flaco Jimenez. "Volver" and "La Mucura" are traditional folk tunes. Three songs are sung solely in Spanish.

== Critical reception ==
Professional ratings
Review scores
Source	Rating
AllMusic	4.5/5 stars
Chicago Tribune	3/4 stars
The Encyclopedia of Popular Music	2/5 stars
MusicHound Rock: The Essential Album Guide	3/5 stars
The Rolling Stone Album Guide	4/5 stars
USA Today	3.5/4 stars

The Austin American-Statesman wrote: "While there's too much soulful artistry involved to be properly showcased within the space of a single album, Zone of Our Own underscores the crucial connections between the Sir Douglas Quintet-style rock of Doug Sahm, the border (and border-transcending) musics of Freddy Fender and Flaco Jimenez and the Tejano-flavored country of Augie Meyers." USA Today noted that the band uses "everything from German polkas to psychedelic rock to Mexican boleros."

The Edmonton Journal determined that "the one true riveting moment on Zone of Our Own comes from a pan-fried, rollicking reworking of 'Is Anyone Goin' to San Antone'." The Chicago Tribune stated that the band has "a clear understanding of and deep love for the many musics that swirl across the Lone Star State."

AllMusic concluded that, "for all the sonic diversity of the Texas Tornados, Zone of Our Own still sounds like it's all of a piece, like the play list of some blessedly eclectic radio station beaming out along the border, as the four frontmen bounce off each other with joyous aplomb." The Rolling Stone Album Guide opined that "swagger this assured takes years to muster."

== Track listing ==
No.	Title	Length
1.	"Is Anybody Goin' to San Antone"
2.	"La Mucura"
3.	"Bailando"
4.	"I'm Not That Kat Anymore"
5.	"Oh Holy One"
6.	"He Is a Tejano"
7.	"El Pantalon Blue Jean"
8.	"Just Can't Fake It"
9.	"Did I Tell You"
10.	"Volver"
