= Motels and Memories =

Single by T. G. Sheppard

from the album Motels and Memories
- B-side: "Pig Skin Charade"
- Released: November 1975
- Genre: Country
- Label: Melodyland
- Songwriter(s): Ron Birmann, Donald Miller

T. G. Sheppard singles chronology
"Another Woman" (1975)	"Motels and Memories" (1975)	"Solitary Man" (1976)

"Motels and Memories" is a song written Ron Birmann and Donald Miller, and recorded by American country music artist T. G. Sheppard. It was released in November 1975 as the first single and title track from his album Motels and Memories. The song peaked at number 7 on the Billboard Hot Country Singles chart. It also reached number 1 on the RPM Country Tracks chart in Canada.

== Chart performance ==
Chart (1975–1976)	Peak position
U.S. Billboard Hot Country Singles	7
U.S. Billboard Bubbling Under Hot 100	2
Canadian RPM Country Tracks	1
