= Somewhere Down the Line =

Single by T.G. Sheppard

from the album Slow Burn
- B-side: "It's a Bad Night for Good Girls"
- Released: June 2, 1984
- Genre: Country
- Length: 3:12
- Label: Warner Bros./Curb
- Songwriter(s): Lewis Anderson, Casey Kelly
- Producer(s): Jim Ed Norman

T.G. Sheppard singles chronology
"Make My Day" (1984)	"Somewhere Down the Line" (1984)	"Home Again" (1984)

"Somewhere Down the Line" is a song written by Lewis Anderson and Casey Kelly, recorded by American country music artist T. G. Sheppard. It was released in June 1984 as the third single from the album Slow Burn. The song reached #3 on the Billboard Hot Country Singles & Tracks chart.

== Charts ==
=== Weekly charts ===
Chart (1984)	Peak position
US Hot Country Songs (Billboard)	3
Canadian RPM Country Tracks	5

=== Year-end charts ===
Chart (1984)	Position
US Hot Country Songs (Billboard)	50
