= Deliver (The Oak Ridge Boys album) =

Studio album by The Oak Ridge Boys
- Released: October 20, 1983
- Recorded: 1983
- Genre: Country
- Length: 35:19
- Label: MCA
- Producer: Ron Chancey

The Oak Ridge Boys chronology
American Made (1983)	Deliver (1983)	Greatest Hits 2 (1984)

Singles from American Made
- 1. "Ozark Mountain Jubilee" Released: October 22, 1983; 2. "I Guess It Never Hurts to Hurt Sometimes" Released: February 25, 1984

Deliver is the tenth album by The Oak Ridge Boys, released in 1983. It includes two singles: "Ozark Mountain Jubilee" and "I Guess It Never Hurts to Hurt Sometimes", both of them hits on Billboard's Hot Country Songs.

== Track listing ==
No.	Title	Writer(s)	Length
1.	"Ozark Mountain Jubilee"	Scott Anders, Roger Murrah	3:14
2.	"When You Get to the Heart"	Tony Brown, Wayland Holyfield, Norro Wilson	3:50
3.	"Alice is in Wonderland"	Brenda Barnett, Charles Chalmers, Sandra Rhodes	3:24
4.	"Ain't No Cure for the Rock N' Roll"	Walter Carter	3:13
5.	"In the Pines"	Traditional; arr. by The Oak Ridge Boys and Ron Chancey	3:32
6.	"I Guess It Never Hurts to Hurt Sometimes"	Randy VanWarmer	4:01
7.	"Through My Eyes"	Doc James	3:52
8.	"Break My Mind"	John D. Loudermilk	3:25
9.	"Still Holding On"	Bob Corbin	3:16
10.	"Down Deep Inside"	Michael Foster, Jimbeau Hinson	3:25

== Personnel ==
=== The Oak Ridge Boys ===
- Joe Bonsall - tenor
- Duane Allen - lead
- William Lee Golden - baritone
- Richard Sterban - bass

=== Additional Musicians ===
- Acoustic Guitar: Kenny Bell, Jimmy Capps, Jerry Shook
- Bass guitar: David Hood, Joe Osborn, Jack Williams
- Drums: Clyde Brooks, Gene Chrisman, Roger Hawkins, Jerry Kroon
- Electric guitar: Jimmy Johnson, Wayne Perkins, Billy Sanford, Reggie Young
- Fiddle: Kenny Lovelace
- Harmonica: Dewey Dorough
- Horns: Harrison Calloway Jr., Jim Horn, Charles Rose, Harvey Thompson
- Keyboards: Barry Beckett, Clayton Ivey, Steve Nathan, Ron Oates
- Percussion: Mickey Buckins
- Saxophone: Dewey Dorough, Denis Solee
- Steel Guitar: Pete Drake, Weldon Myrick
- String Arranger: Bergen White
- Synthesizer: Steve Nathan

== Chart performance ==
=== Album ===
Chart performance for Deliver
Chart (1983)	Peak position
US Top Country Albums (Billboard)	1
US Billboard 200	121

=== Singles ===
Year	Single	Peak positions	
Year	Single	US Country	CAN Country
1983	"Ozark Mountain Jubilee"	5	1
1984	"I Guess It Never Hurts to Hurt Sometimes"	1	1
