= One for the Money (song) =

Single by T. G. Sheppard

from the album One for the Money
- B-side: "Come to Me"
- Released: September 5, 1987
- Genre: Country
- Length: 4:17
- Label: Columbia
- Songwriters: Buck Moore, Mentor Williams
- Producer: Rick Hall

T. G. Sheppard singles chronology
"You're My First Lady" (1987)	"One for the Money" (1987)	"Don't Say It with Diamonds" (1988)

"One for the Money" is a song written by Buck Moore and Mentor Williams, and recorded by American country music artist T. G. Sheppard. It was released in September 1987 as the first single and title track from the album One for the Money. The song reached No. 2 on the Billboard Hot Country Singles & Tracks chart. It was Sheppard's last top 10 hit.

== Content ==
The song is a story about a woman who is torn between her husband and a man with whom she has been having an affair while her husband travels for business.

== Chart performance ==
Chart (1987)	Peak position
US Hot Country Songs (Billboard)	2
Canadian RPM Country Tracks	2
