= One Owner Heart (song) =

Single by T. G. Sheppard

from the album One Owner Heart
- B-side: "I Could Get Used to This"
- Released: November 10, 1984
- Genre: Country
- Length: 2:49
- Label: Warner Bros./Curb
- Songwriter(s): Walt Aldridge, Mac McAnally, Tom Brasfield
- Producer(s): Jim Ed Norman

T. G. Sheppard singles chronology
"Home Again" (1984)	"One Owner Heart" (1984)	"You're Going Out of My Mind" (1985)

"One Owner Heart" is a song written by Walt Aldridge, Mac McAnally and Tom Brasfield, and recorded by American country music artist T. G. Sheppard. It was released in November 1984 as the second single and title track from the album One Owner Heart. The song reached #4 on the Billboard Hot Country Singles & Tracks chart.

== Chart performance ==
Chart (1984–1985)	Peak position
US Hot Country Songs (Billboard)	4
Canadian RPM Country Tracks	3
