= Home Again (Judy Collins album) =

Studio album by Judy Collins
- Released: September 1984
- Recorded: 1983–1984
- Length: 42:03
- Label: Elektra
- Producers: Dave Grusin; Larry Rosen; Michael Masser

Judy Collins chronology
Times of Our Lives (1982)	Home Again (1984)	Amazing Grace (1985)

Professional ratings
Review scores
Source	Rating
AllMusic	3/5 stars
The Encyclopedia of Popular Music	2/5 stars

Home Again is the fifteenth studio album by American singer-songwriter Judy Collins, released in September 1984 by Elektra Records.

Collins had completed the tracks intended for her twentieth album release by Christmas of 1983: however Elektra president Bruce Lundvall recommended that she additionally record the Michael Masser and Gerry Goffin composition "Home Again": Collins' first two studio album releases of the 1980s had evinced a marked decline in her popularity and Lundvall hoped that Collins, a product of the folk music boom, might score a career-boosting C&W hit with "Home Again" were she to duet with an established C&W star. Eventually T. G. Sheppard was recruited to partner Collins on "Home Again" with the track being cut in the summer of 1984 – that being the earliest that Michael Masser's schedule permitted his producing the session with Collins and Sheppard – and the Home Again album and its title cut being released in September 1984. The "Home Again" single would in fact prove a mild C&W chart success stalling at No. 57 and the Home Again album became Collins' first to fall short of the Billboard 200 album chart since her first two albums, issued in respectively 1962 and 1963, signalling Collins' departure from Elektra, who had issued all twenty of her albums.

== Track listing ==
1. "Only You" (Vince Clarke) – 3:22
2. "Sweetheart on Parade" (Elton John, Gary Osborne) – 4:42
3. "Everybody Works in China" (Henry Gross) – 4:24
4. "Yellow Kimono" (Graham Lyle) – 4:58
5. "From Where I Stand" (Amanda McBroom) – 3:36
6. "Home Again" (duet with T. G. Sheppard) (Gerry Goffin, Michael Masser) – 3:36
7. "Shoot First" (Collins) – 6:10
8. "Don't Say Love" (Randy Goodrum, Brent Maher) – 4:10
9. "Dream On" (Collins) – 4:23
10. "The Best Is Yet to Come" (Clifford T. Ward) – 2:42

== Personnel ==
- Judy Collins – lead and backing vocals, guitar, keyboards
- Adrienne Albert – backing vocals
- Tony Battaglia – bass, guitar
- Thomas Bogdan – backing vocals
- Henry Gross – backing vocals
- Dave Grusin – synthesizer, percussion, piano, keyboards, drum programming
- Dann Huff – guitar
- Anthony Jackson – bass
- Paul Jackson Jr. – guitar
- Randy Kerber – keyboards
- Steve Khan – guitar
- Hugh McCracken – guitar
- Yolanda McCullough – backing vocals
- Chris Parker – drums
- Lee Ritenour – guitar
- T. G. Sheppard – backing vocals
- Terry Textor – backing vocals
- Ed Walsh – Fairlight CMI
- Buddy Williams – drums
