= I'll Be Coming Back for More =

Single by T. G. Sheppard

from the album 3/4 Lonely
- B-side: "(She Wanted to Live) Faster Than I Could Dream"
- Released: November 1979
- Recorded: May 1979
- Genre: Country
- Length: 2:55
- Label: Warner Bros./Curb
- Songwriter(s): Curly Putman and Sterling Whipple
- Producer(s): Buddy Killen

T. G. Sheppard singles chronology
"Last Cheater's Waltz" (1979)	"I'll Be Coming Back for More" (1979)	"Smooth Sailin'" (1980)

"I'll Be Coming Back for More" is a song written by Curly Putman and Sterling Whipple, and recorded by American country music artist T. G. Sheppard. It was released in November 1979 as the third single from the album 3/4 Lonely. The song was Sheppard's fourth number one on the country chart. The single stayed at number one for two weeks and spent a total of eleven weeks on the chart.

== Chart performance ==
Chart (1979–1980)	Peak position
US Hot Country Songs (Billboard)	1
Canadian RPM Country Tracks	23

=== Year-end charts ===
Chart (1980)	Position
US Hot Country Songs (Billboard)	12
