= One Owner Heart (album) =

Studio album by T. G. Sheppard
- Released: 1984
- Genre: Country
- Length: 35:36
- Label: Warner Bros./Curb
- Producer: Jim Ed Norman

T. G. Sheppard chronology
| Slow Burn (1983) | One Owner Heart (1984) | Greatest Hits, Volume II (1985) |

Singles from One Owner Heart
- 1. "One Owner Heart" Released: November 10, 1984

One Owner Heart is the thirteenth studio album by American country music artist T. G. Sheppard. It was released in 1985 via Warner Bros. and Curb Records. The album includes the singles "One Owner Heart" and "You're Going Out of My Mind"

== Track listing ==
| No. | Title | Writer(s) | Length |
|---|---|---|---|
| 1. | "You're Going Out of My Mind" | Wayland Holyfield, Jerry McBee | 3:17 |
| 2. | "Sad Song" | Tom Shapiro, Michael Garvin, Bucky Jones | 3:28 |
| 3. | "One Owner Heart" | Walt Aldridge, Mac McAnally, Tom Brasfield | 2:49 |
| 4. | "Looking Out fore Number One" | Shapiro, Garvin | 3:18 |
| 5. | "Love Burning Down" | Ron Moore, Doug Horseman | 4:15 |
| 6. | "I Can' Help but Love You" | Jerry Gillespie, Stan Webb | 3:11 |
| 7. | "Later On" | Bobby Arvon | 4:26 |
| 8. | "In My Dreams" | Troy Seals, Dean Pitchford | 3:19 |
| 9. | "I Could Get Used to This" | Doug Gilmore, Jane Mariash, Bobby Springfield | 2:54 |
| 10. | "Home Again" | Gerry Goffin, Michael Masser | 3:39 |

== Chart performance ==
| Chart (1984) | Peak position |
|---|---|
| US Top Country Albums (Billboard) | 26 |
