= Party Time (song) =

Single by T. G. Sheppard

from the album I Love 'Em All
- B-side: "You Waltzed Yourself Right Into My Life"
- Released: June 1981
- Genre: Country
- Length: 3:33
- Label: Warner Bros./Curb
- Songwriter: Bruce Channel
- Producer: Buddy Killen

T. G. Sheppard singles chronology
"I Loved 'Em Every One" (1981)	"Party Time" (1981)	"Only One You" (1981)

"Party Time" is a song written by Bruce Channel, and recorded by American country music artist T. G. Sheppard. It was released in June 1981 as the second single from the album I Love 'Em All. The song was Sheppard's eighth number one on the country chart. The single stayed at number one for one week and spent a total of thirteen weeks on the country chart.

== Charts ==
Chart (1981)	Peak position
US Hot Country Songs (Billboard)	1
Canadian RPM Country Tracks	2
