= Only One You =

Single by T. G. Sheppard

from the album Finally!
- B-side: "We Belong in Love Tonight"
- Released: November 1981
- Genre: Country
- Length: 3:26
- Label: Warner Bros./Curb
- Songwriters: Michael Garvin; Bucky Jones
- Producer: Buddy Killen

T. G. Sheppard singles chronology
"Party Time" (1981)	"Only One You" (1981)	"Finally" (1982)

"Only One You" is a song written by Michael Garvin and Bucky Jones, and recorded by American country music artist T. G. Sheppard. It was released in November 1981 as the first single from the album Finally!. The song was his ninth No. 1 hit on the Billboard Hot Country Singles chart in February 1982, spending one week atop the chart as part of a 13-week run within the country chart's top 40.

== Content ==
In contrast to some of his earlier hits—including "I Loved 'Em Every One" -- "Only One You" pays tribute to monogamy and uniqueness of a single object of affection. Here, a man illustrates this uniqueness by referencing world landmarks such as the Leaning Tower of Pisa and the Eiffel Tower, masterpieces such as da Vinci's Mona Lisa, the cities New York Town and Paris, Fifth Avenue and one Finest Hour, before telling the woman "there's only one you."

== Charts ==
=== Weekly charts ===
Chart (1981–1982)	Peak position
US Billboard Hot 100	68
US Adult Contemporary (Billboard)	20
US Hot Country Songs (Billboard)	1
Canadian RPM Country Tracks	1

=== Year-end charts ===
Chart (1982)	Position
US Hot Country Songs (Billboard)	33
