= One for the Money (T. G. Sheppard album) =

Studio album by T. G. Sheppard
- Released: August 19, 1987
- Recorded: In 1987 at Fame Recording Studios, Muscle Shoals, Alabama
- Genre: Country
- Length: 35:31
- Label: Columbia
- Producer: Rick Hall

T. G. Sheppard chronology
It Still Rains in Memphis (1987)	One for the Money (1987)	Biggest Hits (1988)

Singles from One for the Money
- 1. "One for the Money" Released: September 5, 1987

One for the Money is the sixteenth studio album by American country music artist T. G. Sheppard. It was released in 1987 via Columbia Records. The albums includes the single "One for the Money".

== Track listing ==
No.	Title	Writer(s)	Length
1.	"One for the Money"	Buck Moore, Mentor Williams	4:14
2.	"Echoes in My Heart"	Anathalee Sandlin, Debi Cochran, Will Robinson	3:38
3.	"So Much for Love"	Robert Byrne, Robinson	3:26
4.	"One of Those Days"	T. G. Sheppard, Mac McAnally	3:21
5.	"Walk of Life"	Mark Knopfler	3:47
6.	"Let's Do It Again"	Earl Bud Lee, Dewayne Blackwell, Herb McCullough	3:38
7.	"Changes"	Billy Henderson, Billy Maddox	3:40
8.	"Everybody Loved Us"	McAnally, Byrne	3:45
9.	"Come to Me"	Vince Gill, Don Schlitz	3:56
10.	"Some Bridges Never Burn"	Keith Stegall, Wayland Holyfield	3:08

== Chart performance ==
Chart (1987)	Peak position
US Top Country Albums (Billboard)	47
