= Strong Heart (T. G. Sheppard song) =

Single by T. G. Sheppard

from the album It Still Rains in Memphis
- B-side: "What You Gonna Do?"
- Released: May 1986
- Recorded: 1985
- Genre: Country
- Length: 3:36
- Label: Columbia
- Songwriters: Austin Roberts; Charlie Black; Tommy Rocco
- Producer: Rick Hall

T. G. Sheppard singles chronology
"In Over My Heart" (1985)	"Strong Heart" (1986)	"Half Past Forever (Till I'm Blue in the Heart)" (1986)

"Strong Heart" is a song written by Tommy Rocco, Charlie Black, and Austin Roberts, and recorded by American country music artist T. G. Sheppard. It was released in May 1986 as the first single from the album It Still Rains in Memphis. The song was Sheppard's fourteenth and final number-one on the U.S. country singles chart. The single spent one week at number one on the U.S. country singles chart in August 1986.

== Chart performance ==
Chart (1986)	Peak position
US Hot Country Songs (Billboard)	1
Canadian RPM Country Tracks	1
