= Slow Burn (T. G. Sheppard song) =

Single by T. G. Sheppard

from the album Slow Burn
- Released: September 1983
- Recorded: June 1983
- Genre: Country
- Length: 3:31 (single edit); 4:17 (album version)
- Label: Warner Bros./Curb
- Songwriter(s): Charlie Black; Tommy Rocco
- Producer(s): Jim Ed Norman

T. G. Sheppard singles chronology
"Without You" (1983)	"Slow Burn" (1983)	"Make My Day" (1984)

"Slow Burn" is a song written by Tommy Rocco and Charlie Black, and recorded by American country music artist T. G. Sheppard. It was released in September 1983 as the first single and title track from the album Slow Burn.

The song was Sheppard's 13th number one on the Billboard Hot Country Singles chart, and spent one week atop the chart as part of a 14-week run within the chart's Top 40.

== Content ==
The song is about a deeply emotional but long-lasting love affair.

== Single and album edits ==
The single edit has an earlier fade than the full album version.

== Chart performance ==
=== Weekly charts ===
Chart (1983–1984)	Peak position
Canadian RPM Country Tracks	1
US Hot Country Songs (Billboard)	1

=== Year-end charts ===
Chart (1984)	Position
US Hot Country Songs (Billboard)	39
