= Do You Wanna Go to Heaven =

Single by T. G. Sheppard

from the album Smooth Sailin'
- B-side: "How Far Our Love Goes"
- Released: July 1980
- Genre: Country
- Length: 3:10
- Label: Warner Bros./Curb
- Songwriter(s): Curly Putman; Bucky Jones
- Producer(s): Buddy Killen

T. G. Sheppard singles chronology
"Smooth Sailin'" (1980)	"Do You Wanna Go to Heaven" (1980)	"I Feel Like Loving You Again" (1980)

"Do You Wanna Go to Heaven" is a song written by Curly Putman and Bucky Jones, and recorded by American country music artist T. G. Sheppard. It was released in July 1980 as the second single from the album Smooth Sailin'. The song was Sheppard's fifth number one on the country chart. The single went to number one for one week and spent a total of eleven weeks on the country chart.

== Content ==
The song is told through the eyes of a promiscuous young man who has had many sexual experiences, and plays upon the double-meaning of the word "heaven." He first recalls his baptism and how the preacher asked the protagonist (then a young boy), "Do you want to go to Heaven," referring to the religious concept of the afterlife (where good people go after their death).

Later in the song, the man recalls his sexual awakening, where—after a high school dance—he and his teen-aged girlfriend, Bonnie Lou, are alone. Bonnie Lou uses her charms to come on to her boyfriend, asking him before they initiate sex, "Do you want to go to heaven." In this sense, "heaven" refers to the blissful experience of sexual intercourse.

In the final verse, the man is broken down and drowning his sorrows at a tavern. He sees a possible sexual partner at the end of the bar and thinks "she would be a prize to win." Neither one shows any resistance as the two begin their encounter, as once again the term "heaven" refers to the intense pleasure of sex.

At the end of each verse, the man says, "I'll never forget, I remember it yet, that taste of that clear, pure water," before recalling to various degrees the words of the preacher and his expectations that he will live a Christ-centered life. The man, as a young boy and teenager, upholds this promise until—as the song progresses—they become dimmer (his first experience with Bonnie Lou) to totally forgotten (the drunken encounter with the woman at the end of the bar).

== Charts ==
Chart (1980)	Peak position
US Hot Country Songs (Billboard)	1
Canadian RPM Country Tracks	15
