= War Is Hell (On the Homefront Too) =

Single by T. G. Sheppard

from the album Perfect Stranger
- B-side: "In Another Minute"
- Released: July 1982
- Genre: Country
- Length: 3:25
- Label: Warner Bros./Curb
- Songwriter(s): Curly Putman; Bucky Jones; Dan Wilson
- Producer(s): Buddy Killen

T. G. Sheppard singles chronology
"Finally" (1982)	"War Is Hell (On the Homefront Too)" (1982)	"Faking Love" (1982)

"War Is Hell (On the Homefront Too)" is a song written by Curly Putman, Bucky Jones and Dan Wilson, and recorded by American country music artist T. G. Sheppard. It was released in July 1982 as the first single from the album Perfect Stranger. The song was Sheppard's 11th No. 1 song on the Hot Country Singles chart in the fall of 1982. The single went to number one for one week and spent a total of thirteen weeks on the country chart.

== Content ==
The story about a teenaged boy's sexual initiation by a married woman whose husband was stationed on the front lines in World War II. The song is sung in the first person, from the perspective of the teenage boy.

== Charts ==
Chart (1982)	Peak position
US Hot Country Songs (Billboard)	1
Canadian RPM Country Tracks	5

== See also ==
- List of anti-war songs
