= Last Cheater's Waltz =

Single by T. G. Sheppard

from the album 3/4 Lonely
- B-side: "You Do It to Me Every Time"
- Released: August 1979
- Recorded: February 1979
- Genre: Country
- Length: 3:47
- Label: Warner Bros. Nashville/Curb
- Songwriter(s): Sonny Throckmorton
- Producer(s): Buddy Killen

T. G. Sheppard singles chronology
"You Feel Good All Over" (1979)	"Last Cheater's Waltz" (1979)	"I'll Be Coming Back for More'" (1979)

"Last Cheater's Waltz" is the title track from Sonny Throckmorton's 1978 album Last Cheater's Waltz. Throckmorton released the song as a double-A-side with "Smooth Sailin'" and charted at number 47 on the Hot Country Songs charts that year.

In late 1979, T. G. Sheppard covered both songs. He released "Last Cheater's Waltz" as a single in 1979, reaching number one on Hot Country Songs. Emmylou Harris covered the song on her 1981 album Cimmaron

== Charts ==
=== Weekly charts ===
Chart (1979)	Peak position
US Hot Country Songs (Billboard)	1
Canadian RPM Country Tracks	7

=== Year-end charts ===
Chart (1979)	Position
US Hot Country Songs (Billboard)	11
