= Fooled Around and Fell in Love =

Song written and performed by Elvin Bishop

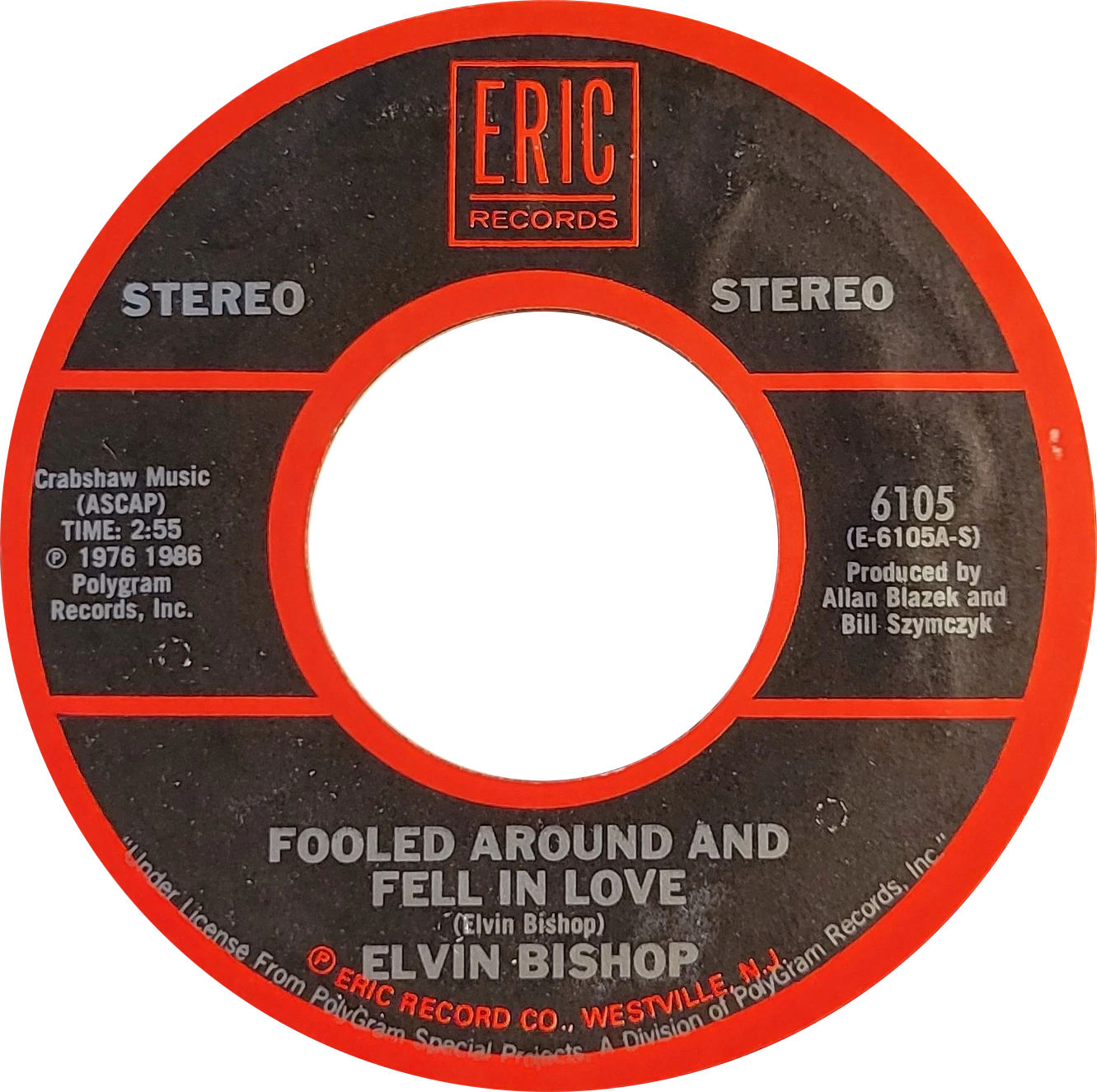
- 1986 US reissue

Single by Elvin Bishop

from the album Struttin' My Stuff
- B-side: "Have a Good Time"
- Released: February 1976
- Recorded: 1975
- Studio: Criteria (Miami)
- Genre: Southern rock; soft rock; R&B
- Length: 4:35 (album version); 2:55 (single version)
- Label: Capricorn
- Songwriter: Elvin Bishop
- Producer: Bill Szymczyk

Elvin Bishop singles chronology
"Sure Feels Good" (1975)	"Fooled Around and Fell in Love" (1976)	"Struttin' My Stuff" (1976)

Official audio
- "Fooled Around And Fell In Love" on YouTube

"Fooled Around and Fell in Love" is a song written and performed by blues guitarist Elvin Bishop with Mickey Thomas on lead vocals. It appeared on Bishop's 1975 album Struttin' My Stuff, and was released as a single the following year.

== Background ==
Bishop does not sing lead vocals on the track. He felt that his gravelly voice would not do the song justice; he invited vocalist Mickey Thomas, who was a background singer in his band at the time, to sing it. It peaked at No. 3 on the Billboard Hot 100 singles chart in May 1976. The record was certified gold by the Recording Industry Association of America on June 23, 1976. In Canada, the song reached #22 on the singles chart and #8 on the Adult Contemporary chart. The single reached #3 in the New Zealand Singles Chart.

Based on his work with Bishop, Thomas was invited to become the lead singer for Jefferson Starship (which would later evolve into simply Starship).

The song was offered to The Osmonds, who rejected it because they felt the record did not meet their moral standards.

== Critical reception ==
Reviewing the single, Cashbox said that the song's chorus "works well in this gospel chorded rock ballad" and also praised the vocals, saying that they were sung with "confidence and strength rarely heard in rock n roll." In their 1990 essay "Rock and Sexuality", Simon Frith and Angela McRobbie suggest the song "lyrically captures" the distinction in rock music between "cock rock" and "teeny bop".

== Personnel ==
- Mickey Thomas - lead and backing vocals
- Elvin Bishop - lead guitar
- Johnny 'V' Vernazza - lead and rhythm guitar (duelling guitar leads with Bishop), backing vocals.
- Philip Aaberg – piano
- Mike Keck – organ
- Donny Baldwin – drums, percussion
- Michael Brooks – bass
- Reni Slais – backing vocals
- Bill Szymczyk – producer

== Chart performance ==
=== Weekly charts ===
Elvin Bishop

Chart (1976)	Peak position
Australia (Kent Music Report)	16
Canada RPM Top Singles	22
Canada RPM Adult Contemporary	8
New Zealand (RIANZ)	3
UK Singles (OCC)	34
U.S. Billboard Hot 100	3
U.S. Cash Box Top 100	3

Julian Laxton Band

Chart (1978)	Peak position
South Africa (Springbok)	13

=== Year-end charts ===
Chart (1976)	Rank
Canada RPM Top Singles	167
New Zealand	13
U.S. Billboard Hot 100	56
U.S. Cash Box	28

== Certifications ==
Region	Certification	Certified units/sales
United Kingdom (BPI)	Silver	200,000^{‡}
United States (RIAA)	Gold	1,000,000^{^}
^{^} Shipments figures based on certification alone.^{‡} Sales+streaming figures based on certification alone.

== Cover versions ==
- In 1978, the Julian Laxton Band from South Africa reached #13 there.
- In 1985, T. G. Sheppard covered the song on his album Livin' on the Edge and it peaked at number 21 on the Billboard Hot Country Songs chart.
- In 2019, Miranda Lambert released a track featuring her Roadside Bars & Pink Guitars Tour support acts Maren Morris, Ashley McBryde, Tenille Townes, Elle King and Caylee Hammack. It won the Academy of Country Music Award for Vocal Event of the Year and was nominated for the Country Music Association Award for Musical Event of the Year.
- In 2006, Rod Stewart performed his rendition of the song on Still the Same... Great Rock Classics of Our Time.
