= Finally (T. G. Sheppard song) =

Single by T. G. Sheppard

from the album Finally!
- B-side: "All My Cloudy Days Are Gone"
- Released: March 1982
- Genre: Country
- Length: 3:54
- Label: Warner Bros./Curb
- Songwriter(s): Gary Chapman
- Producer(s): Buddy Killen

T. G. Sheppard singles chronology
"Only One You" (1981)	"Finally" (1982)	"War Is Hell (On the Homefront Too)" (1982)

"Finally" is a song written by Gary Chapman, and recorded by American country music artist T. G. Sheppard. It was released in March 1982 as the second single and title track from the album Finally!. The song was Sheppard's tenth number one on the country chart. The single stayed at number one for one week and spent a total of ten weeks on the country chart.

== Music video ==
A music video was produced for the song, a rarity in country music at the time.

== Charts ==
Chart (1982)	Peak position
US Hot Country Songs (Billboard)	1
US Adult Contemporary (Billboard)	17
US Billboard Hot 100	58
Canadian RPM Country Tracks	10
