= Texas Tornados =

American band

- Origin: San Francisco, California, U.S.
- Genres: Country, tejano, texas country, country rock
- Years active: 1989–present
- Labels: Reprise; Virgin; New West; Bismeaux
- Members: Shawn Sahm; Louie Ortega; Ernie Durawa
- Past members: Freddy Fender; Augie Meyers; Flaco Jiménez; Doug Sahm; Oscar Tellez; Speedy Sparks

Texas Tornados is an American Tejano supergroup, composed of some of country music's biggest artists who modernized the Tex-Mex style including Flaco Jiménez, Augie Meyers, Doug Sahm, and Freddy Fender. Its music is a fusion of conjunto (German and Norteño Mexican fusion music of Texas) with rock, country, and various Mexican styles.

== History ==
The initial combination of Flaco Jiménez, Augie Meyers, and Doug Sahm performed in front of a San Francisco audience. After they initially performed as the Tex-Mex Revue, they took the title Texas Tornados, after Sahm's song "Texas Tornado", from the album of the same name.

Another account of the group's birth says they formed when record company executives looking to cash in on regional music sales approached Sahm and Meyers around 1990, and they brought in longtime friends and collaborators Fender and Jiménez. Sahm had released albums under the name Texas Tornados as early as the 1970s, some featuring Fender or Meyers. Jiménez and Meyers played on Sahm's Atlantic Records debut in 1971. As Fender once said, "You've heard of New Kids on the Block? We're the Old Guys in the Street."

Individually, this quartet has had major success:

- Freddy Fender was a cross-over success story around the world, with hits like "Before the Next Teardrop Falls" and "Wasted Days and Wasted Nights".
- Flaco Jiménez has played with acts such as The Rolling Stones and Dwight Yoakam. He also is known as the "Father of Conjunto Music" (he played the Conjunto accordion).
- Augie Meyers has shared the stage with the likes of the Allman Brothers Band and Bob Dylan. He is also a member of the Texas Music Hall of Fame.
- Doug Sahm and Augie Meyers were both members of the 1960s pop-rock band the Sir Douglas Quintet, with hits such as "She's About a Mover" and "Mendocino" to their credit. Meyers's signature sound on the Vox organ was a prominent feature of the band's sound. Sahm, Meyers, and Jiménez are from the San Antonio area.

The band's 1990 debut was recorded in both English and Spanish versions. The Texas Tornados were asked to perform all over the world, such as at the presidential inauguration of Bill Clinton and the Montreux Jazz Festival, and made regular appearances at Farm Aid and the Houston Livestock and Rodeo Show. They won a Grammy award in 1990 for Best Mexican/American Performance. Their 1996 single "A Little Bit Is Better Than Nada" accompanied the opening credits of the golf movie Tin Cup, which was released the same year, and is included in the official soundtrack.

Among their other albums is Live From the Limo, the last album to be recorded with the original lineup, as Sahm died in 1999, the year of its release. Fender, who had health problems in later years, died in 2006. Their 2005 Live from Austin album was a recording of a 1990 performance on the TV series Austin City Limits.

People sometimes refer to their lyrics as Spanglish because of the mixture of English and Spanish in the same song, in addition to pronouncing the Spanish lyrics in an American accent, which is evident in their hit, "(Hey Baby) Que Pasó?". An example is the lyric "Don't you know I love you / and my corazón is real?", in which the word corazón (Spanish for "heart") is improperly pronounced /ˌkɔːrəˈsoʊn/, with an obvious American accent, instead of [koɾaˈson]. The band's self-titled debut album was offered in Spanish and English-language versions.

In 2022, the Congressional Hispanic Caucus proposed "Hey Baby (Que Pasó)?" among the songs to be nominated for their inclusion on the National Recording Registry.

== 2010 - Está Bueno! ==
Augie Meyers and Flaco Jiménez reunited with the son of Doug Sahm, Shawn Sahm, in a new recording that includes five previously unreleased vocal performances from the legendary Freddy Fender. The collection, entitled "Está Bueno," includes new songs written by Fender, such as the swamp pop ballad "If I Could Only"; an instant new Tornados-style classic written by Doug and Shawn Sahm, "Who's to Blame, Señorita?"; and several Augie Meyers songs recorded for the first time by the Tornados, such as "Velma from Selma" and "My Sugar Blue." The album was produced by Shawn Sahm and was released nationally by Ray Benson's Bismeaux Records on March 2, 2010.

Playing together again for the first time since the '90s and feeling what Shawn calls "the Tornado vibe," the group enlisted Shawn to take over and "drive the bus" for their first album in over a decade. His goal for the record was "to keep it a straight up Tex-Mex rock and roll record." When they first began recording, Shawn was very pleased but not surprised to hear them "sounding like they are playing at the top of their game." He stated, "When you hear this record, you hear why they are the legends they are."

Shawn Sahm has been around the music industry since he was 13 and was the perfect person to entrust with preserving the Tornados' legacy. He fine-tuned each track according to the group's feedback, giving each detail serious attention. Throughout the process, he insisted to all of them, "It is not done until you are happy." For the album's release, Benson's Bismeaux Records, in Austin, was an obvious choice. Shawn Sahm commented, "Everyone knew they had a great record and they felt it would be important to go with someone who understood the legacy of the Texas Tornados. I knew Ray was the right guy. They have been friends for a long time. If anyone understood the legacy of the band, it was Ray."

"Having known the original Texas Tornados, I was delighted when Shawn brought me the tracks of the new Texas Tornados CD," said Benson. "Besides the wonderful Freddy Fender songs recorded shortly before his passing, Augie, Flaco and Shawn have recorded an album true to the Tornados sound and vision. I am honored to present their CD on Bismeaux Records for old fans and I am sure a host of new ones, too."

In addition to the featured members, the recordings include Tornado original musicians Louie Ortega, Speedy Sparks, and Ernie Durawa. Flaco Jiménez stated, "The groove is back."

== Deaths ==
Doug Sahm died on November 18, 1999, at the age of 58. Oscar Tellez died in a vehicle collision on May 26, 2002, at the age of 56. Freddy Fender died on October 14, 2006, at the age of 69.

On July 31, 2025, Flaco Jiménez died at the age of 86. Augie Meyers died on March 07, 2026, at the age of 85.

Miller "Speedy" Sparks died in October 2025, at the age of 79.

== Discography ==
=== Albums ===
Year	Album	Chart Positions			Label
Year	Album	US Country	US	US Regional Mexican	Label
1990	Los Texas Tornados				Reprise
1990	Texas Tornados	25	154		Reprise
1991	Zone of Our Own	50			Reprise
1992	Hangin' on by a Thread			5	Reprise
1994	Best of The Texas Tornados				Reprise
1996	4 Aces				Reprise
1999	Live from the Limo, Vol. 1				Virgin
2005	Live from Austin, TX				New West
2010	Está Bueno!				Bismeaux

=== Singles ===
Year	Single	Album
1990	"Who Were You Thinkin' Of"	Texas Tornados
1991	"A Man Can Cry"	Texas Tornados
1991	"Adios Mexico"	Texas Tornados
1991	"Is Anybody Goin' to San Antone"	Zone of Our Own
1992	"Guacamole"	Hangin' on By a Thread
1996	"A Little Bit is Better Than Nada"	4 Aces
1996	"The Cibola Mixes"	re-mixed versions from 4 Aces
2010	"Chicano"	Esta Bueno!

=== Music videos ===
Year	Video	Director
1990	"Who Were You Thinking Of"	D. Gorton
1990	"Rosa de Amor"	
1991	"Adios Mexico"	Sherman Halsey
1991	"Is Anybody Goin' to San Antone"	
1992	"Guacamole"	Thom Oliphant
1996	"A Little Bit Is Better Than Nada"	R. Brad Murano/Steven T. Miller

== Awards and nominations ==
=== Grammy Awards ===
The Grammy Awards are awarded annually by the National Academy of Recording Arts and Sciences of the United States.

Year	Nominee / work	Award	Result
1991	Soy De San Luis	Best Mexican-American Performance	Won
1992	Zone Of Our Own (Album)	Best Country Performance By A Duo Or Group With Vocal	Nominated
1997	Little Bit Is Better Than Nada (Track)	Best Country Performance By A Duo Or Group With Vocal	Nominated
