= Karen Brooks (singer) =

American singer-songwriter

- Born: April 30, 1954 (age 72)
- Origin: Dallas, Texas, United States
- Genres: Country
- Occupation: singer
- Instrument: Vocals
- Years active: 1982–1992
- Labels: Warner; Mercury

Karen Brooks (born April 30, 1954) is an American country music singer and songwriter who is best known for a series of singles recorded by Emmylou Harris, Rosanne Cash, Patty Loveless, Tanya Tucker, Russell Smith, David Allan Coe, Crystal Gayle and Exile. She recorded a duet with Johnny Cash, "I Will Dance With You", and also with T. G. Sheppard, "Faking Love", which was a number one hit on the Billboard country chart in February 1983. She also had a number of top 40 songs as a recording artist on Warner Records.

Brooks was born in Dallas, Texas, United States. She attended Justin F. Kimball High School with schoolmate Stevie Ray Vaughan (Class of '72). She was formerly married to Gary P. Nunn, with whom she had one child, a son, Lukin Tolliver Nunn. Her mother, Lynn Brooks, was a make-up artist in the motion-picture industry. During the latter half of the 1970s and the early half of the 1980s, she lent her vocals to recordings by Jerry Jeff Walker, David Allan Coe, Steven Fromholz, Gary P. Nunn, Townes Van Zandt, Anne Murray and Emmylou Harris.

She remained a popular background singer for much of the late 1970s. She then headed to California to work alongside Rodney Crowell, where she eventually picked up a recording contract with Warner Bros. Records. Both "New Way Out" and "Faking Love" hit the Top 20 of Billboard.

== Discography ==
=== Albums ===
Year	Album	Peak positions		Label
Year	Album	US Country	CAN Country	Label
1982	Walk On	38	—	Warner
1984	Hearts on Fire	40	21	Warner
1985	I Will Dance with You	—	—	Warner
1992	That's Another Story (with Randy Sharp)	—	—	Mercury
"—" denotes releases that did not chart

=== Singles ===
Year	Single	Peak positions		Album
Year	Single	US Country	CAN Country	Album
1982	"New Way Out"	17	—	Walk On
1982	"Faking Love" (with T.G. Sheppard)	1	1	Perfect Stranger
1983	"If That's What You're Thinking"	21	—	Walk On
1983	"Walk On"	30	—	Walk On
1984	"Born to Love You"	40	—	Hearts on Fire
1984	"Tonight I'm Here with Someone Else"	19	14	Hearts on Fire
1985	"A Simple I Love You"	63	—	Hearts on Fire
1985	"I Will Dance with You" (with Johnny Cash)	45	—	I Will Dance with You
1992	"Baby I'm the One" (with Randy Sharp)	—	—	That's Another Story
1992	"That's Another Story" (with Randy Sharp)	—	—	That's Another Story
"—" denotes releases that did not chart

== Awards and nominations ==
Year	Organization	Award	Nominee/Work	Result
1983	Academy of Country Music Awards	Top New Female Vocalist	Karen Brooks	Won
1984	Academy of Country Music Awards	Top Vocal Duo of the Year	T.G. Sheppard and Karen Brooks	Nominated
