= I Loved 'Em Every One =

Single by T. G. Sheppard

from the album I Love 'Em All
- B-side: "I Could Never Dream the Way You Feel"
- Released: March 1981
- Genre: Country
- Length: 3:41
- Label: Warner Bros./Curb
- Songwriter: Phil Sampson
- Producer: Buddy Killen

T. G. Sheppard singles chronology
"I Feel Like Loving You Again" (1980)	"I Loved 'Em Every One" (1981)	"Party Time" (1981)

"I Loved 'Em Every One" is a song written by Phil Sampson, and recorded by American country music artist T. G. Sheppard. It was released in March 1981 as the first single from the album I Love 'Em All. The song was Sheppard's seventh number one on the country chart. The single stayed at number one for one week and spent ten weeks on the country chart. "I Loved' Em Every One" was also Sheppard's only Top 40 single on Billboard's Hot 100, reaching #37.

== Content ==
The song is a man's tribute to all the women he had encountered through the years. The women apparently come from a variety of backgrounds and sizes ("big or little, or short or tall"), and have had as few as one meeting with him. The man then says he wishes he could have "kept them all."

== Charts ==
Chart (1981)	Peak position
US Hot Country Songs (Billboard)	1
US Adult Contemporary (Billboard)	3
US Billboard Hot 100	37
Canadian RPM Country Tracks	3
Canadian RPM Adult Contemporary Tracks	8
