= Sonny Throckmorton =

American songwriter (born 1941)

- Born: James Fron Throckmorton; April 2, 1941 (age 85); Carlsbad, New Mexico, U.S.
- Genre: Country
- Occupations: Songwriter, singer
- Years active: 1965–1988

James Fron "Sonny" Throckmorton (born April 2, 1941) is an American country music songwriter. He has had more than 1,000 of his songs recorded by various country singers. He has also had minor success as a recording artist, having released two major-label albums: The Last Cheater's Waltz in 1978 on Mercury Records and Southern Train in 1986 on Warner Bros. Records. Throckmorton is a member of the Nashville Songwriters Hall of Fame, and has been awarded Songwriter of the Year by both Broadcast Music Incorporated and the Nashville Songwriters Association International.

== Biography and career ==
Throckmorton was born in Carlsbad, New Mexico, and his family moved to Wichita Falls, Texas, shortly after his birth. After graduating from college, he moved to San Francisco, California, and first played rock and roll before switching his focus to country music at record producer Pete Drake's suggestion. By 1964, he played bass guitar for Carl Butler and Pearl, and was signed to a publishing contract; his first hit as a songwriter was "How Long Has It Been", which was a top-10 country hit for Bobby Lewis. Throckmorton was later signed to a contract with Sony/Tree Publishing, but was fired after none of his songs became hits.

Throckmorton returned to Texas in 1975. However, other songwriters had continued selling his songs, and he was soon rehired by Tree Publishing. Over 150 of his songs were recorded in only nine months, including Johnny Duncan's first number-one hit, "Thinking of a Rendezvous". Other artists who had hits with his songs included John Conlee, Dave & Sugar, Merle Haggard, the Oak Ridge Boys, and Jerry Lee Lewis. Throckmorton was also signed to a recording contract with Mercury Records in 1976, although none of the singles from his debut album The Last Cheater's Waltz reached the top 40. He was also named Songwriter of the Year by the Nashville Songwriters Association International in 1978, 1979, and 1980, and by Broadcast Music Incorporated in 1980. Between 1976 and 1980, at least one of his songs appeared on the country charts almost every week, and overall, more than a thousand of his songs were recorded by country artists. Throckmorton's streak of songwriting continued into the 1980s and 1990s, with Mel McDaniel, George Strait, and Doug Stone recording his material, as well.

Throckmorton was inducted into the Nashville Songwriters Hall of Fame in 1985. Three years later, he signed to a second recording contract with Warner Bros. Records, releasing the album Southern Train, but no singles. Throckmorton retired to his ranch in Texas in 1988 to care for his dying father.

In 2019, Willie Nelson recorded a version of "Ride Me Back Home" by Sonny Throckmorton and released an album with the same title.

== Discography ==
=== Albums ===
- Last Cheater's Waltz (1978)
- Southern Train (1986)

=== Singles ===
Year	Single	US Country
1976	"Rosie"	76
1977	"Lovin' You, Lovin' Me"	73
1978	"I Wish You Could Have Turned My Head (And Left My Heart Alone)"	54
1979	"Smooth Sailin'"/"Last Cheater's Waltz"	47
1979	"Can't You Hear That Whistle Blow"	66
1980	"Friday Night Blues"	89
1981	"A Girl Like You"	77
