= Curly Putman =

American country music singer-songwriter (1930–2016)

- Born: Claude Putman Jr. November 20, 1930; Princeton, Alabama, U.S.
- Died: October 30, 2016 (aged 85) Lebanon, Tennessee, U.S.
- Genres: Country music
- Occupation: Songwriter

Claude "Curly" Putman Jr. (November 20, 1930 – October 30, 2016) was an American songwriter.

Born in Princeton, Alabama, his greatest success was "Green, Green Grass of Home" (1964, sung by Porter Wagoner), which was covered by Roger Miller, Elvis Presley, Kenny Rogers, Don Williams, Johnny Paycheck, Burl Ives, Johnny Darrell, Gram Parsons, Joan Baez, Jerry Lee Lewis, The Grateful Dead, Johnny Cash, Roberto Leal, Dean Martin, George Jones, Merle Haggard, Bobby Bare, Joe Tex, Nana Mouskouri, Charley Pride, and Tom Jones. Among other songs he wrote were "D-I-V-O-R-C-E" and "He Stopped Loving Her Today".

== Biography ==
Putman was the son of a sawmill worker. He joined the Navy and spent four years on the aircraft carrier USS Valley Forge.

He married Bernice Soon in 1956. Putman penned his first hit, "Green, Green Grass of Home", when working in Nashville plugging songs for Tree Records.

== Death ==
Putman died of congestive heart failure and kidney failure at his home in Lebanon, Tennessee at age 85.

== Legacy ==
Alabama State Route 65 through the Paint Rock Valley in North Alabama is named in Putman's honor, as well as a community park in Princeton.

== Pop influence ==
The Paul McCartney & Wings hit "Junior's Farm" was inspired by their short stay at Putman's farm in rural Wilson County, Tennessee in 1974.

== Awards ==
- Inducted into the Nashville Songwriters Hall of Fame in 1976.
- Inducted into the Alabama Music Hall of Fame in 1993.
- Won – 1980 – CMA Song of the Year – He Stopped Loving Her Today (Bobby Braddock, Curly Putman).
- Won – 1980 ACM – Song of the Year – He Stopped Loving Her Today (Bobby Braddock, Curly Putman).
- Won – 1981 CMA – Song of the Year – He Stopped Loving Her Today (Bobby Braddock, Curly Putman).
- Nominated – 1967 CMA – Song of the Year – My Elusive Dreams (Billy Sherrill, Curly Putman).
- Nominated – 1968 CMA – Song of the Year – D-I-V-O-R-C-E (Bobby Braddock, Curly Putman).
- Nominated – 1968 Grammy Awards – Best Country Song – D-I-V-O-R-C-E (Bobby Braddock, Curly Putman).
- Nominated – 1980 Grammy Awards – Best Country Song – He Stopped Loving Her Today (Bobby Braddock, Curly Putman).

== Selected list of Curly Putman recorded songs ==
- "Baby I'll Be Coming Back For More" (Curly Putman, Sterling Whipple) // Released by T.G. Sheppard
- "Baby You're Something" (Curly Putman, Don Cook, Rafe Van Hoy) // Released by John Conlee
- "Ballad Of Two Brothers" (Curly Putman, Buddy Killen, Bobby Braddock) // Released by Autry Inman (1968)
- "Blood Red And Going Down" (Curly Putman) // Released by Tanya Tucker, Graham Blvd, Melba Montgomery, Knightsbridge
- "Change My Mind" (Curly Putman) // Released by Waylon Jennings (1969)
- "Couldn't Love Have Picked A Better Place To Die" (Curly Putman, Bucky Jones) // Released by Gene Watson (2016), Curly Putman (2010), Clinton Gregory, George Jones, Mickey Gilley
- "D-I-V-O-R-C-E" (Putman, Bobby Braddock) // Released by Conway Twitty (1968), Tammy Wynette (1968), Kitty Wells (1968), Dolly Parton (1969), Dottie West (1969), Billy Connolly (1975), Hourglass, Countdown Singers
- "Dad Blame Anything A Man Can't Quit" (Curly Putman, Roger Miller) // Released by Roger Miller (1966)
- "Deep Dark Hollow Road" (Curly Putman, Glen Duncan, Adam Engelhardt) // Released by The Del McCoury Band (2018)
- "Do You Wanna Go to Heaven" (Curly Putman, Bucky Jones) // Released by T.G. Sheppard, Lorraine Jordan & Carolina Road (2015)
- "Don't It Seem To Rain A Lot" (Curly Putman) // Released by George Hamilton IV (1972)
- "Dumb Blonde" (Curly Putman) // Released by Dolly Parton (1967), Liz Anderson (1968), Dolly Parton & Miranda Lambert (2020)
- "Dying To Live Again" (Curly Putman, Dan Lomax) // Released by Junior Sisk (2017)
- "Easy Look" (Curly Putman, Sonny Throckmorton) // Released by Charlie Rich
- "Ever-Changing Woman" (Curly Putman, Dave Kirby) // Released by Merle Haggard (1980), Randy Travis (2013), J.D. Crowe & The New South (1994), Brother Phelps (1993), Noel Cassidy (2014)
- "Every Step Of The Way" (Curly Putman) // Released by Ferlin Husky (1970)
- "Famous Last Words" (Curly Putman, Ron Hellard, Bucky Jones) // Released by George Jones (1983)
- "Green, Green Grass of Home" (Putman) // Released by Ben Colder (1963), Del Reeves (1965), Jerry Lee Lewis (1965, 1967), Conway Twitty (1965), Porter Wagoner (1966), Stu Phillips (1966), The Statler Brothers (1966), Ferlin Husky (1966), Roy Drusky (1966), Charley Pride (1966), Ben Colder (1967), Dean Martin (1967), Roger Miller (1967), George Jones (1967), Dallas Frazier (1967), Tom Jones (1967), Johnny Paycheck (1967), Trini Lopez (1968), Frankie Laine (1968), Joe Tex (1968), Henson Cargill (1968), Merle Haggard (1968), Hank Snow (1968), Johnny Cash (1968), Floyd Cramer (1968), Jack Palance (1969), Joan Baez (1969), George Melachrino & His Orchestra (1970), Carolina the Band (2022), Ferlin Husky
- "He Stopped Loving Her Today" (Curly Putman, Bobby Braddock) // Released by George Jones
- "Hopelessly Yours" (Curly Putman, Don Cook, Keith Whitley) // Released by John Conlee, George Jones (1986), Lee Greenwood and Suzy Bogguss, Lorrie Morgan (2018)
- "I Meant Every Word He Said" (Curly Putman, Bucky Jones, Joe Chambers) // Released by Ricky Van Shelton (1990)
- "I Think I Know" (Curly Putman) // Released by Marion Worth (1963)
- "I Turn To You" (Curly Putman, Max D Barnes) // Released by George Jones (1986)
- "I Wish That I Could Hurt That Way Again" (Curly Putman, Rafe Van Hoy, Don Cook) // Released by Debby Boone, John Conlee, Brenda Lee, Kenny Rogers, Tina Adair (2023), T. Graham Brown (2022)
- "If You Think I Love You Now (I've Just Started)" (Curly Putman, Billy Sherrill) // Released by Tammy Wynette (1971), Jody Miller (1970)
- "It Don't Feel Like Sinnin' To Me" (Curly Putman, Michael Kosser) // Released by The Kendalls (1988)
- "It's a Cheating Situation" (Curly Putman, Sonny Throckmorton) // Released by Moe Bandy, Billy Taylor, John Prine & Dolores Keane (1999)
- "I'm Not The Boy I Used To Be" (Curly Putman) // Released by Tommy Cash (1966)
- "Jailbirds Can't Fly" (Curly Putman) // Released by Tommy Cash (1966)
- "Just For You" (Curly Putman, Larry Butler) // Released by Ferlin Husky
- "Last Laugh" (Curly Putman, Bobby Braddock) // Released by Jim Ed Brown (1967)
- "Let's Keep It That Way" (Curly Putman, Rafe Van Hoy)
- "Let's Wait A Little Longer" (Curly Putman/ Billy Sherrill) // Released by Loretta Lynn & Ernest Tubb (1969), Dottie West & Don Gibson (1969)
- "Little Boy Soldier" (Curly Putman) // Released by Wanda Jackson (1968)
- "Made For Loving You" (Curly Putman, Sonny Throckmorton) // Released by Doug Stone (1990), Dan Seals (1990),
- "My Arms Stay Open Late" (Curly Putman, Dan Lomax) // Released by Billie Jo Spears (1969)
- "My Elusive Dreams" (Curly Putman, Billy Sherrill) // Released by David Houston & Tammy Wynette (1967), Margie Singleton (1967), Jack Greene (1968), Nancy Sinatra & Lee Hazlewood (1968), Lloyd Green (1968), Bobbie Gentry (1968), Roger Miller (1968), James Burton & Ralph Mooney (1969), Ernest Ranglin (1969), Bobby Bare (1970), Don Gibson (1970), Bobby Vinton (1970), Bill Anderson (1970), Tex Ritter (1970)
- "Older The Violin, The Sweeter The Music" (Curly Putman) // Released by Hank Thompson, Curly Putman (2010)
- "One Dime For The Wine" (Curly Putman) // Released by Porter Wagoner (1967)
- "Sally Trash" (Curly Putman, Chet Atkins) // Released by Tammy Wynette (1970)
- "Set Me Free" (Curly Putman, Marvin Walters) // Released by Tammy Wynette (1967), Clarence Carter (1968), Ray Price (1968), Charlie Rich (1968), Dottie West & Don Gibson (1969), Brook Benton (1969), Ferlin Husky (1970)
- "She's Got My Love and Goes Again" (Curly Putman, Red Lane) // Released by Tommy Cash (1966)
- "Smooth Sailing" (Curly Putman, Sonny Throckmorton) // Released by T.G. Sheppard
- "There's A New Kid In Town" (Curly Putman, Don Cook, Keith Whitley) // Released by Kenny Rogers (2015), Chris Young (2016)
- "War Is Hell (On The Homefront Too)" (Curly Putman, Bucky Jones, Dan Wilson) // Released by T.G. Sheppard
- "What I'd Give To Be The Wind" (Curly Putman, Red Lane) // Released by Roger Miller (1968)
- "When Can We Do This Again" (Curly Putman, Sonny Throckmorton) // Released by T.G. Sheppard
- "Whole Lotta Laying Around" (Curly Putman, Glen Duncan, Adam Engelhardt) // Released by Chris Roberts (2018)
- "You Can't Have Your Kate And Edith, Too" (Curly Putman, Bobby Braddock) // Released by The Statler Brothers (1966)
- "You Moved Up In Your World" (Curly Putman, Dale Dodson, Brett Eldredge) // Released by Mark Chesnutt (2016)

== Discography ==
=== Albums ===
- 1967: Lonesome Country of Curly Putman (ABC)
- 1969: World of Country Music (ABC)
- 2010: Write 'em Sad – Sing 'em Lonesome (Curly Putman / Engelhardt Music Group)

=== Singles ===
Year	Single	Chart Positions	
Year	Single	US Country	US Bubbling
1960	"The Prison Song"	23	—
1967	"My Elusive Dreams"	41	34
1967	"Set Me Free"	67	—
