= T. G. Sheppard =

American country music singer (born 1944)

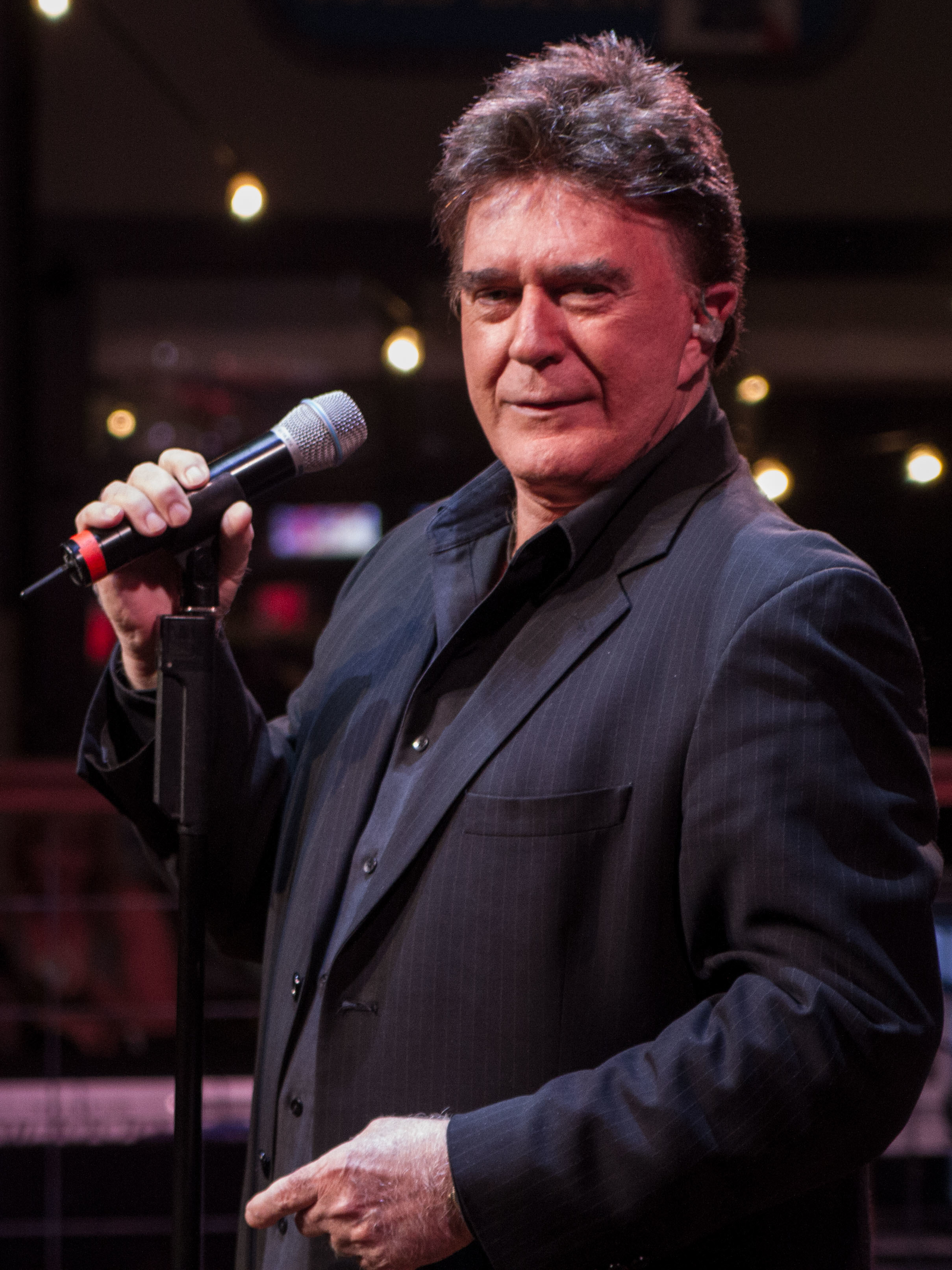
- Sheppard in 2015

Background information
- Also known as: Brian Stacy
- Born: William Neal Browder; July 20, 1944 (age 81); Humboldt, Tennessee, U.S.
- Genres: Country; countrypolitan
- Occupation: Singer
- Years active: 1966–present
- Labels: Melodyland; Hitsville; Warner Bros.; Curb; Columbia
- Website: tgsheppard.com

William Neal Browder (born July 20, 1944) is an American country music singer, known professionally as T. G. Sheppard. He had 22 number-one hits on the US country charts between 1974 and 1986, including 14 consecutive number ones between 1980 and 1982.

== Early life ==
Browder was born in Humboldt, Tennessee, United States. He dropped out of high school at age 15 and ran away from home to become involved in the music industry in Memphis, Tennessee.

== Career ==
William Browder, as he was then known, first recorded for Atco Records as Brian Stacy in 1966. Browder worked as an executive at RCA during the early 1970s, but in 1974, signed with Melodyland (later Hitsville) Records, a short-lived country label owned by Motown Records. He used the stage name T.G. Sheppard to avoid jeopardizing his job with RCA, due to his recording material with a different label. According to Browder, "The T.G. in my stage name is really and truly just initials. A lot of people through the years have had fun putting what they want the initials to stand for, but they really don't mean anything, they are just initials."

He recorded the song "Devil in the Bottle", which became a No. 1 hit on Billboard's Hot Country Singles chart and also became a top 60 Pop hit in 1975. The follow-up, "Tryin' to Beat the Morning Home", also went to No. 1 and cracked the top 100 during the summer of 1975. Several subsequent releases during 1975–77 made the top 10 like "Motels and Memories" and "Show Me a Man".

In 1977, Sheppard signed with Warner Bros. Records. Starting with that summer's "When Can We Do This Again", he had a series of fifteen consecutive top 10 releases, including 10 No. 1 songs. The biggest included "Last Cheater's Waltz" (1979); "I'll Be Coming Back for More" and "Do You Wanna Go to Heaven" (1980); "I Loved 'Em Every One" and "Party Time" (1981); "Only One You", "Finally", and "War Is Hell (On the Homefront Too)" (1982). Another major hit came in 1984: "Slow Burn". "I Loved 'Em Every One" also reached the top forty on the U.S. Billboard Hot 100. In 1984 he recorded, as a duet with Judy Collins, the title track of Home Again, her final album for Elektra Records.

In 1985, he moved from Warner Bros. to Columbia Records. After just missing the top 20 with "Fooled Around and Fell in Love" (a remake of the Elvin Bishop hit), he returned to the top 10, with his biggest success during this time frame coming with 1986's "Strong Heart" (the last of his No. 1 hits, as it turned out). Three more songs peaked at No. 2 in 1987: "Half Past Forever (Till I'm Blue in the Heart)", "You're My First Lady", and "One for the Money".

Sheppard's success continued until about 1988, when rootsy neo-traditionalist artists began to eclipse more polished pop-country artists. In 1995, he took a two-year hiatus from the road to perform exclusively for eight months a year at T.G. Sheppard's Theater in the Smokies, a state-of-the-art theater in the heart of the Great Smoky Mountains. When the theater was sold in 1997, he returned to the road. He continued to tour and play throughout the 1990s, but did not sign a new record contract, and did not release any new material until 1997. His 2002 live release, T.G. Sheppard: Live at Billy Bob's, found Sheppard performing his classic hits for an enthusiastic crowd at the famed honky tonk in Fort Worth, Texas. Sheppard released Timeless in 2004, an album that had him singing songs from the big band era. In the mid to late 1980s, he was an associate sponsor on the No. 25 Folgers Chevrolet driven on the NASCAR Cup Series by Tim Richmond and Ken Schrader. In 1990, the Folgers sponsorship moved to Roush racing and driver Mark Martin.

T.G. Sheppard currently tours throughout the year and, after a two-decade hiatus, he released a new single "I Wanna Live Like Elvis" in January 2019 with a new album set to be released at a later date.

Sheppard was a friend of Elvis Presley's and hosts his own show on SiriusXM's Elvis Radio. Sheppard's show was created to replace new broadcasts of disc jockey and Presley friend George Klein's show after Klein's death in 2019.

== Personal life ==
Sheppard is married to singer-songwriter Kelly Lang and resides in Hendersonville, Tennessee. Sheppard owned a small chain of now-defunct restaurants under the name of "T.G.'s North of the Border Cafe and Cantina" in Tennessee. The restaurant had locations in Gatlinburg and Chattanooga.

== Filmography ==
Year	Title	Role	Notes
1974	The Second Coming of Suzanne	John	
1983	Twice Upon a Time	Rusher of Din – Office Executive	
