= Willie Nelson's Fourth of July Picnic =

Annual music festival

- Genre: music festival
- Date: around July 4th
- Frequency: Annually
- Location: Variable
- Years active: 1973–2019, 2021–
- Inaugurated: 4 July 1973
- Most recent: 4 July 2026 (Austin, Texas)
- Website: williespicnic.com

Willie Nelson's Fourth of July Picnic is an annual concert hosted by country music singer Willie Nelson. Nelson was inspired to create the annual concert after his participation in the 1972 Dripping Springs Reunion, that was hosted at Hurlbut Ranch in Dripping Springs, Texas. As part of the lineup, Nelson performed on the third day. The event failed to meet the expected attendance due to the concert being poorly promoted.

Interested in the concept, Nelson decided to host the inaugural Willie Nelson's Fourth of July Picnic in the same place, as it was already prepared to host a concert. The success of the event led to other concerts. During the late 1970s, the bad reputation of the concert for recurrent problems with safety of the audience made it difficult to find venues. During the 1980s the security improved, and the event recovered the trust of the potential venues.

== History ==
=== Dripping Springs Reunion ===
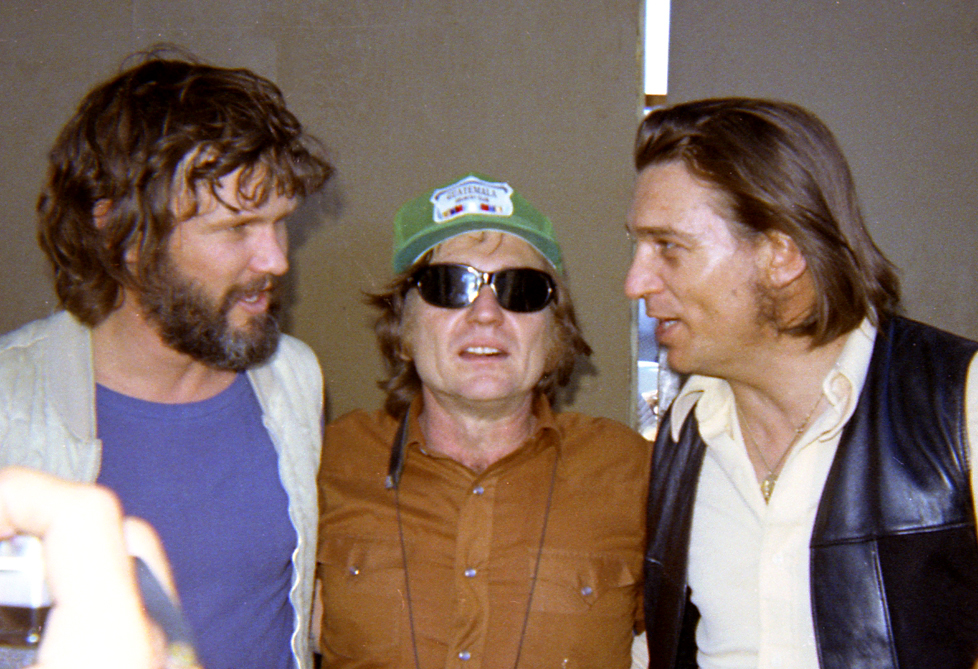
(L-R) Kris Kristofferson, Willie Nelson, Waylon Jennings at Dripping Springs reunion

Willie Nelson was inspired to start a yearly festival by the 1972 Dripping Springs Reunion, where he was a part of the lineup. In 1971, four music promoters from Dallas, Texas decided to create a massive music festival for country music audiences. Edward Allen, Michael McFarland, Don Snyder and Peter Smith, chose the Hurlbut Ranch, owned by James Hurlbut in Dripping Springs, Texas, to be the place for the festival. After working on the grounds for months to prepare the site, the festival was set to last three days, between March 17-19, 1972. The lineup included Earl Scruggs, Hank Snow, Sonny James, Tom T. Hall, Tex Ritter, Roy Acuff, Willie Nelson, Waylon Jennings, Charlie Rich, The Collins Kids, and Kris Kristofferson. Due to the lack of funds, the event was poorly promoted. The expected total attendance was 180,000 to 225,000 for the three days, but it failed to reach 40,000. Security was provided by 123 men on foot, 40 perimeter horse riders, highway patrolmen and two helicopters. According to Nelson's biographer Joe Nick Patoski, the concert "helped spark the rise of progressive country music and recognition of Austin as a music hub".

=== The picnic ===
In 1973, Willie Nelson's first 4th of July picnic took place in the same ranch. Nelson selected the place because it was already prepared to hold a concert. The event attracted an estimated attendance of 40,000, and became an annual festival. Before the concert, the Texas Senate Resolution 687 proclaimed July 4, 1975, as "Willie Nelson Day". The organization provided only few portable toilets, while trash was left around the concert site and the town. The event was qualified as "moral pollution" by the local residents. For the bad organization of the concert, Nelson was fined US$1,000 for violating the Texas Mass Gatherings Act. During the late 1970s the bad reputation of the concert often led to problems finding a venue. In 1976, the planned three-day concert had an estimated attendance of 80,000, the largest in the history of the picnic. The concert ended on July 5 after the rain shorted the PA system. One attendee drowned while four were stabbed. There were 140 arrests, four kidnappings, and three reported rapes. Nelson was sued by the ranch owner, the ambulance service and two attendants.

During the 1980s the security was reinforced in the picnics, improving the reputation of the event. The outdoors were fenced and the number of negative incidents reduced. During the 1990s the picnic was often held in Luckenbach, Texas, while in the 2000s the recurrent location was Billy Bob's Texas, at the Fort Worth Stockyards.

In 2020 the Picnic was set to return to the Texas hill country on Nelson's "Luck, TX" property, home to the annual Luck Reunion "anti-festival". In lieu of an in-person festival, Luck Productions produced a virtual event that consisted of live-streamed performances and a 90-minute short film commemorating the history of the event. Participants included: Willie Nelson; Nathaniel Rateliff; Steve Earle; Lyle Lovett; Robert Earl Keen; Margo Price; Edie Brickell; and more.

In 2024, the Picnic will be held in Camden, New Jersey.

In 2024, Texas A&M University Press published a history of the Picnic, titled Picnic: Willie Nelson's Fourth of July Tradition, written by Austin author Dave Dalton Thomas.

== List of concerts ==
Willie Nelson's Fourth of July Picnic has been hosted on the following occasions:

Year	City	Venue	Lineup included	Notes
1973	Dripping Springs, Texas	Hurlbut Ranch	Willie Nelson, Waylon Jennings, Kris Kristofferson, John Prine, Doug Sahm, Sammi Smith and Tom T. Hall	First picnic
1974	College Station, Texas	Texas World Speedway	Willie Nelson, Rick Nelson and the Stone Canyon Band, Jimmy Buffett, Townes Van Zandt and Kinky Friedman	The festival was held on 4–6 July. A fire destroyed the car of Robert Earl Keen; a photo of which was depicted on the album cover Picnic
1975	Liberty Hill, Texas	Overton Ranch	Willie Nelson, Johnny Bush, Rita Coolidge and the Pointer Sisters	Nelson was fined with 1,000 for violating the Texas Mass Gatherings Act
1976	Gonzales, Texas	Sterling Kelly Ranch	Willie Nelson, Waylon Jennings, Doug Sahm, Ernest Tubb, Roger Miller, Kris Kristofferson, Jerry Jeff Walker, Leon Russell, Ray Wiley Hubbard, George Jones and B.W. Stevenson	The concert was held on July 3–5. The attendance rounded 80,000. A person drowned while four were stabbed. There were 140 arrests, four kidnaps and three reported rapes
1977	Tulsa, Oklahoma	Tulsa Fairgrounds Speedway	Willie Nelson, Lynyrd Skynyrd, Waylon Jennings, Jesse Colter, Jerry Jeff Walker, Asleep at the Wheel, Leon Russell, and Jerry Jeff Walker	The concert was held on July 3
1978	Kansas City, Missouri	Arrowhead Stadium	Willie Nelson, Grateful Dead, Waylon Jennings, Jessie Colter, Jerry Jeff Walker, Missouri (band)	The concert was held on July 1 Hell's Angels worked stage security
1979	Austin, Texas	Pedernales Country Club	Willie Nelson, Ernest Tubb and Johnny Paycheck	—
1980	Austin, Texas	Pedernales Country Club	Willie Nelson, Ray Price and Faron Young	—
1981	—	—	—	—
1982	—	—	—	—
1983	Atlanta, Georgia [Hampton]	Atlanta International Raceway	Willie Nelson, Waylon & Jessie, Linda Ronstadt, David Allan Coe and Stray Cats	300,000 people, 99 degrees
1984	Austin, Texas	Southpark Meadows	Willie Nelson, Johnny Rodriguez, Moe Bandy and Joe Ely	—
1985	Austin, Texas	Southpark Meadows	Willie Nelson, Waylon Jennings, Kris Kristofferson, Johnny Cash, Neil Young, Hank Snow and June Carter Cash	—
1986	—	—	—	The concert coincided with Farm Aid II
1987	Hillsboro, Texas	Carl's Corner	Willie Nelson, Bruce Hornsby, Jackie King and Roger Miller	—
1988	—	—	—	—
1989	—	—	—	—
1990	Austin, Texas	Zilker Park	The Highwaymen, Shelby Lynne and Little Joe	—
1991	—	—	—	—
1992	—	—	—	—
1993	—	—	—	—
1994	—	—	—	—
1995	Luckenbach, Texas	—	Willie Nelson, Robert Earl Keen and T. Bingo	—
1996	Luckenbach, Texas	—	Willie Nelson, Asleep at the Wheel, Waylon Jennings, Souvenirs, Supersuckers, Billy Joe Shaver	—
1997	Luckenbach, Texas	—	Willie Nelson, Dwight Yoakam, Joe Ely	—
1998	Luckenbach, Texas	—	Willie Nelson, Emmylou Harris, Asleep at the Wheel, Derek O'Brien and Toni Price	—
1999	Luckenbach, Texas	—	Willie Nelson, Larry Gatlin and Pat Green	—
2000	Austin, Texas	Southpark Meadows	Willie Nelson, Jimmie Dale Gilmore and Mark David Manders	—
2001	Luckenbach, Texas	—	Willie Nelson, Ray Price, Pat Green, Leon Russell, Cory Morrow, David Allen Coe	Cancelled
2002	—	—	—	—
2003	Spicewood, Texas	Two River Canyon Amphitheater	Willie Nelson, Pat Green, Neil Young and Crazy Horse, The Dead, Merle Haggard, Leon Russell, Toby Keith, Patty Griffin and Billy Bob Thornton	Concert performed on July 4–5
2004	Fort Worth, Texas	Billy Bob's Texas	'Willie Nelson, Kris Kristofferson, Cross Canadian Ragweed and Clarence Brown	—
2005	Fort Worth, Texas	Billy Bob's Texas	Willie Nelson, Bob Dylan, Doobie Brothers, Lightnin' Willie & the Poorboys and Pauline Reese	—
2006	Fort Worth, Texas	Billy Bob's Texas	Willie Nelson, Paula Nelson, Noel Haggard, Shooter Jennings, Lucas Hubbard, Nitty Gritty Dirt Band and Folk Uke	—
2007	George, WA	The Gorge Amphitheatre	Son Volt, Old 97s, Drive-By Truckers and 40 Points	—
2008	Selma, Texas/Houston, Texas	Verizon Wireless Amphitheater/Sam Houston Race Park	Ray Price, Paula Nelson, David Allan Coe, Ray Wylie Hubbard, Los Lonely Boys and Del Castillo	—
2009	South Bend, IN	Stanley Coveleski Stadium	Willie Nelson, Bob Dylan, John Mellencamp	The concert was held July 4th
2010	Bee Cave, Texas	The Backyard	Tim O'Connor, Ray Wylie Hubbard, Kris Kristofferson, The Reflectacles, Jamey Johnson, Billy Bob Thornton and Jack Ingram	—
2011	Fort Worth, Texas	Billy Bob's Texas	Willie Nelson, Country Throwdown tour, Billy Joe Shaver and David Allan Coe	—
2012	Fort Worth, Texas	Billy Bob's Texas	Willie Nelson, Asleep at the Wheel, Billy Joe Shaver, Ray Price, Johnny Bush	—
2013	Fort Worth, Texas	Fort Worth Stockyards, Billy Bob's Texas	Willie Nelson, Asleep at the Wheel, Billy Joe Shaver, Ray Price, Johnny Bush, Leon Russell, Kris Kristofferson, David Allan Coe, Ray, Ray Wylie Hubbard, Jamey Johnson, Paula Nelson	40th anniversary picnic
2014	Fort Worth, Texas	Fort Worth Stockyards, Billy Bob's Texas	Willie Nelson, Charley Pride, David Allan Coe, Ryan Bingham, Jamey Johnson, Ray Wylie Hubbard, Dierks Bentley	—
2015	Austin, Texas	Circuit of The Americas	Willie Nelson, Eric Church, Merle Haggard, Kacey Musgraves, Jason Isbell, Asleep at the Wheel, Sturgill Simpson, Leon Russell, Chris Stapleton, Billy Joe Shaver, Johnny Bush, Kris Kristofferson, David Allan Coe, Ray Wylie Hubbard, Jamey Johnson, Paula Nelson, Greezy Wheels, Raelyn Nelson Band, Folk Uke, Hudson Moore, Amber Digby, Pauline Reese	—
2016	Austin, Texas	Austin360 Amphitheater	Willie Nelson, Alison Krauss, Amber Digby, Asleep at the Wheel, Billy Joe Shaver, Brantley Gilbert, Cody Johnson, Dallas Wayne, David Allan Coe, Folk Uke, Jamestown Revival, Jamey Johnson, Johnny Bush, Kris Kristofferson, Lee Ann Womack, Leon Russell, Margo Price, Paula Nelson, Ray Wylie Hubbard, Shakey Graves	—
2017	Austin, Texas	Austin360 Amphitheater	Willie Nelson, Asleep at the Wheel, Billy Joe Shaver, David Allan Coe, Folk Uke, Hayes Carll, Insects vs Robots, Jamey Johnson, Johnny Bush, Kacey Musgraves, Lukas Nelson & Promise of the Real, Margo Price, Ray Wylie Hubbard, Sheryl Crow, Steve Earle & The Dukes, Turnpike Troubadours	
2018	Austin, Texas	Austin360 Amphitheater	Willie Nelson, Asleep at the Wheel, Billy Joe Shaver, David Allan Coe, Edie Brickell & New Bohemians, Folk Uke, Gene Watson, Jamestown Revival, Johnny Bush, Lukas Nelson & Promise of the Real, Margo Price, Particle Kid, Ray Wylie Hubbard, Ryan Bingham, Sturgill Simpson, The Head and the Heart, The Wild Feathers	—
2019	Austin, Texas	Austin360 Amphitheater	Willie Nelson, Alison Krauss, Billy Joe Shaver, Colter Wall, David Allan Coe, Folk Uke, Gene Watson, Hayes Carll, Jamey Johnson, Johnny Bush, Luke Combs, Nathaniel Rateliff, Ray Wylie Hubbard, Steve Earle & The Dukes	—
2022	Austin, Texas	Q2 Stadium	Willie Nelson, Jason Isbell and the 400 Unit, Tyler Childers, Midland, Charley Crockett, Brothers Osborne, Allison Russell, Particle Kid, Steve Earle & the Dukes, Asleep at the Wheel	—
2023	Austin, Texas	Q2 Stadium	Willie Nelson, Tyler Childers, Shakey Graves, Particle Kid, Asleep at the Wheel, Sierra Ferrell, Dwight Yoakam, Shane Smith and the Saints	—
2024	Camden, New Jersey	Freedom Mortgage Pavilion	Willie Nelson, Bob Dylan, Robert Plant & Alison Krause, Maren Morris, Mavis Staples, Celisse	—
2025	Austin, Texas	Germania Insurance Amphitheater	Willie Nelson, Bob Dylan, The Avett Brothers, The Mavericks, Asleep at the Wheel, Tami Neilson	—
2026	Austin, Texas	Germania Insurance Amphitheater	Willie Nelson, Billy Strings, Wilco, Sheryl Crow, Lukas Nelson, Stephen Wilson Jr., Rodney Crowell, Margo Price, Lily Meola	—
