= Farm Aid =

Annual benefit music festival for American farmers

- Genre: Country, Folk, Rock
- Location: United States
- Years active: 1985–present
- Founders: Willie Nelson, Neil Young, and John Mellencamp
- Next event: September 26, 2026
- Website: Official website

Farm Aid is an American benefit concert and non-profit organization founded in 1985 by musicians Willie Nelson, Neil Young, and John Mellencamp.

The goal of the benefit concert is to provide financial relief to family farmers in the United States, to improve agricultural conditions in soil and water, and to support domestic, locally owned farms as they compete against large-scale agribusiness. The concept for a farm benefit was originally proposed by Bob Dylan at Live Aid, which inspired Nelson, Young, and Mellencamp to create what is now Farm Aid.

Farm Aid is one of the longest-running benefit concerts in the United States, spanning over four decades.

== History ==
Willie Nelson at Farm Aid 2010. Nelson, who picked cotton and pulled corn as a boy in Abbott, Texas, developed deep sympathies with family farmers and rural communities.

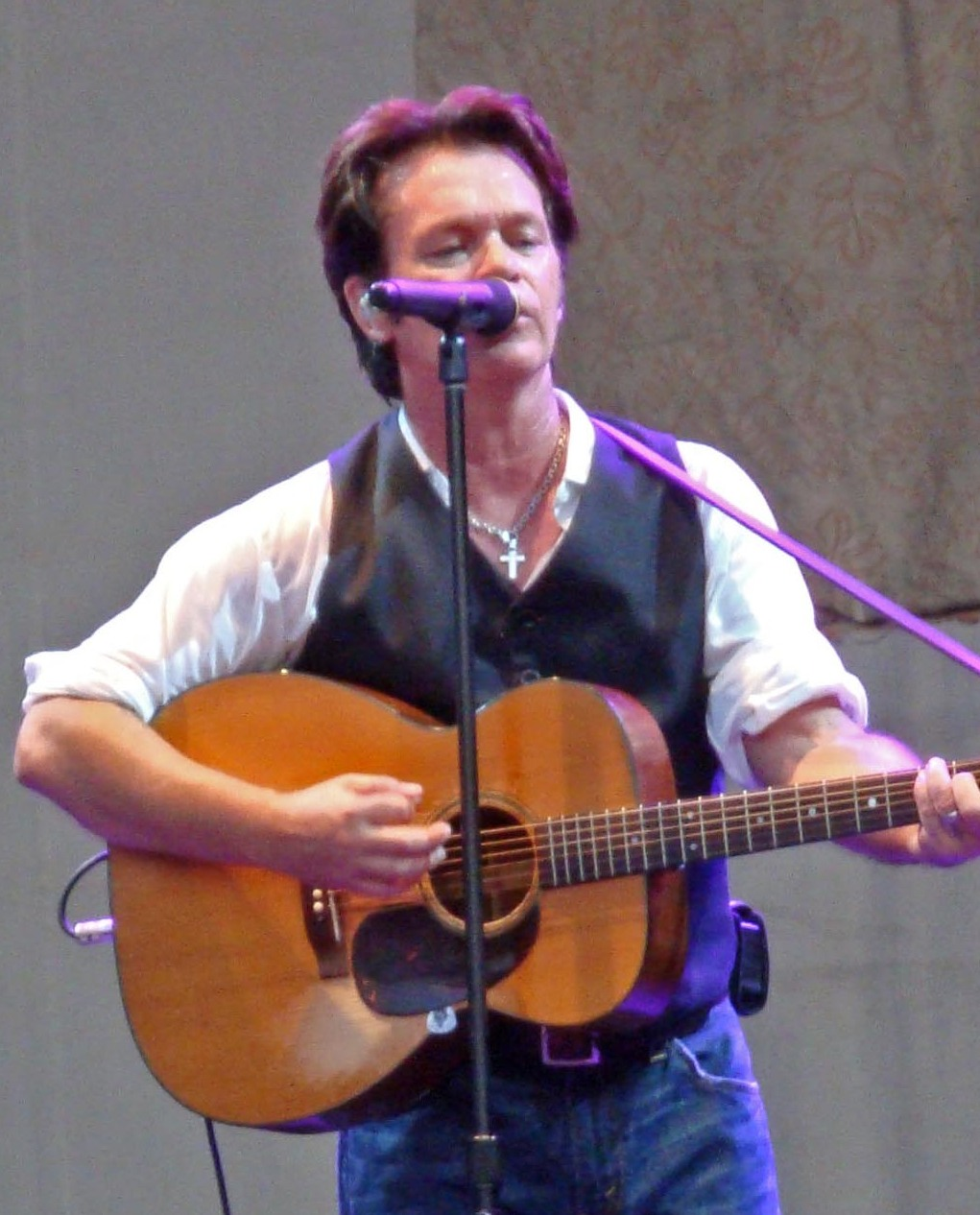
John Mellencamp in 2009. Mellencamp grew up in both Seymour and Bloomington, Indiana. His 1985 song "Rain on the Scarecrow" caught the attention of Willie Nelson, who saw the song as an allegory to the plight of farmers.

On July 13, 1985, before performing "When the Ship Comes In" with Keith Richards and Ron Wood at the Live Aid benefit concert for the 1983–1985 Ethiopian famine, Bob Dylan remarked about family farmers within the United States in danger of losing their farms through mortgage debt, saying to the worldwide audience exceeding one billion people, "I hope that some of the money ... maybe they can just take a little bit of it, maybe ... one or two million, maybe ... and use it, say, to pay the mortgages on some of the farms and, the farmers here, owe to the banks." He is often misquoted, as on Farm Aid's official website, as saying "Wouldn't it be great if we did something for our own farmers right here in America?"

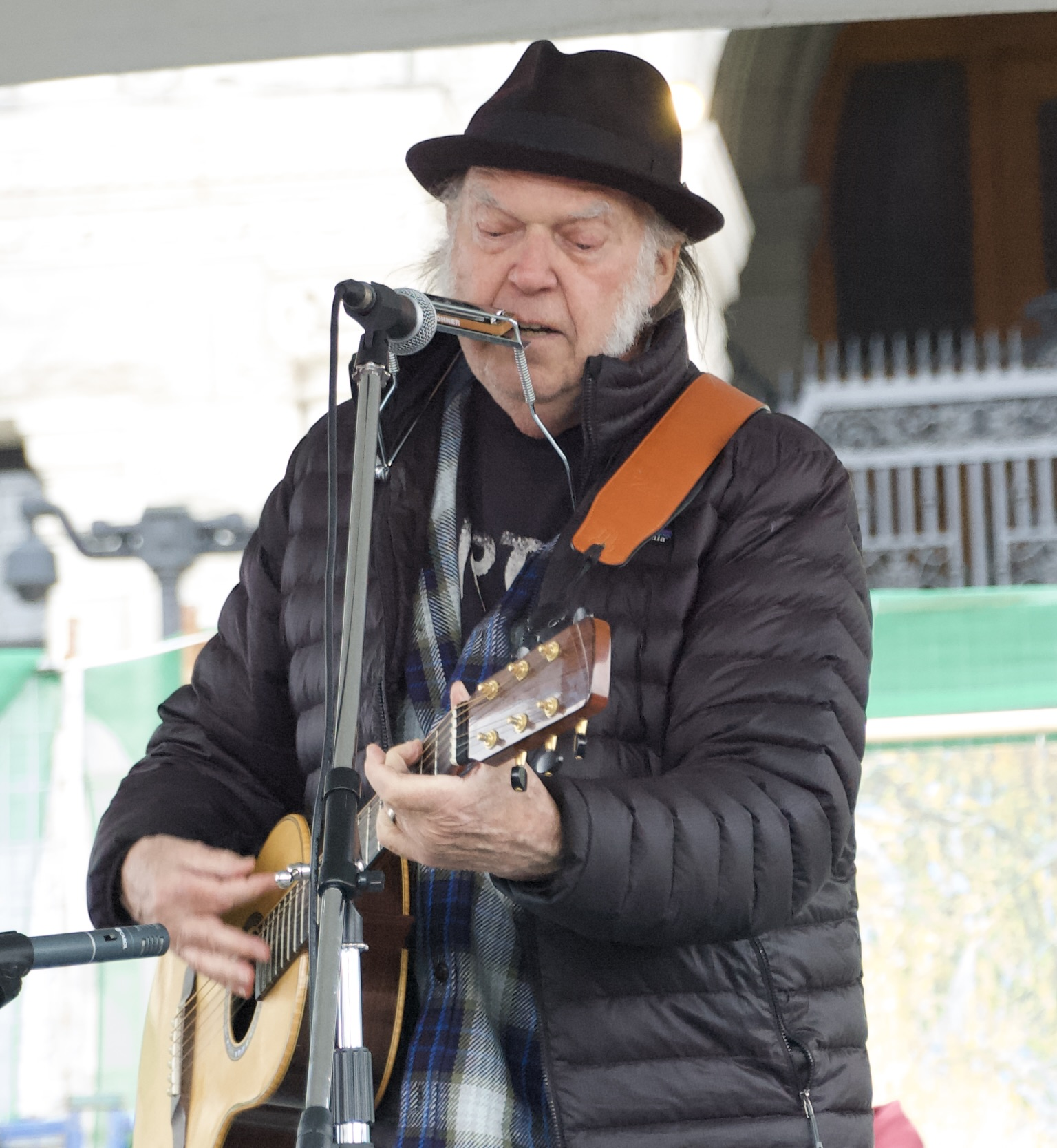
Neil Young in 2023. A Canadian, Young spent much of his "formative" early childhood in rural Ontario, in the town of Omemee.

Although his comments were heavily criticised, they inspired fellow musicians Willie Nelson, John Mellencamp and Neil Young to organize the Farm Aid benefit concert to raise money for and help family farmers in the United States. The first concert was held on September 22, 1985, at Memorial Stadium in Champaign, Illinois, before a crowd of 80,000 people. Performers included Bob Dylan, Billy Joel, B.B. King, Loretta Lynn, Roy Orbison, and Tom Petty, among others, and raised over $9 million for U.S. family farmers.

In 2022, Farm Aid sought national recognition for the effort to encourage Americans to buy domestic beef.

== Structure ==
Willie and the other founders had originally thought that they could have one concert and the problem would be solved, but they admitted that the challenges facing family farmers were more complex than anyone realized.

As a result, decades after the first show, Farm Aid, under the direction of Carolyn Mugar, has been working to increase awareness of the importance of family farms, and puts on an annual concert of country, blues and rock music with a variety of music artists. The board of directors includes Nelson, Mellencamp, Young, and Dave Matthews, as well as David Anderson, Joel Katz, Lana Nelson, Mark Rothbaum, and Evelyn Shriver.

On April 8, 2021, it was announced that Annie Nelson and Margo Price joined as board members. Board member Paul English, who was Willie Nelson's longtime drummer, died in February 2020.

== Service ==
The organization operates an emergency hotline that offers farmers resources and advice about challenges they're experiencing. Early on, Nelson and Mellencamp brought family farmers before Congress to testify about the state of family farming in America. Congress subsequently passed the Agricultural Credit Act of 1987 to help save family farms from foreclosure. Farm Aid also operates a disaster fund to help farmers who lose their belongings and crops through natural disasters, such as the victims of Hurricane Katrina and massive flooding in 2019. The funds raised are used to pay the farmer's expenses and provide food, legal and financial help, and psychological assistance.

== List of concerts ==
Farm Aid events
Event	Date	Location	Venue	Lineup	Notes
Farm Aid	September 22, 1985	Champaign, Illinois	Memorial Stadium	Alabama, Hoyt Axton, The Beach Boys, The Blasters, Bon Jovi, Jimmy Buffett, Glen Campbell, Johnny Cash, David Allan Coe, John Conlee, Charlie Daniels Band, John Denver, Bob Dylan, John Fogerty, Foreigner, Vince Gill, Vern Gosdin, Arlo Guthrie, Sammy Hagar, Merle Haggard, Daryl Hall, Emmylou Harris, Don Henley, Waylon Jennings, Billy Joel, Randy Newman, George Jones, Rickie Lee Jones, B.B. King, Carole King, Kris Kristofferson, Huey Lewis, Lone Justice, Loretta Lynn, Roger McGuinn, John Mellencamp, Roger Miller, Joni Mitchell, Nitty Gritty Dirt Band, Willie Nelson, Roy Orbison, Tom Petty and the Heartbreakers, Charley Pride, Bonnie Raitt, Lou Reed, Kenny Rogers, Brian Setzer, Sissy Spacek, Tanya Tucker, Eddie Van Halen, Debra Winger, The Winters Brothers Band, Neil Young, Dave Millsap, Joe Ely, Judy Rodman, X	First public appearance of Sammy Hagar and Eddie Van Halen together shortly after Hagar joined Van Halen.
Farm Aid II	July 4, 1986	Manor, Texas	Manor Downs Racetrack	Alabama, The Beach Boys, The Bellamy Brothers, The Blasters, Judy Collins, Rita Coolidge, Bob Dylan, Steve Earle, Joe Ely, Exile, The Fabulous Thunderbirds, William Lee Golden & The Goldens, Grateful Dead, Emmylou Harris, Julio Iglesias, Rick James, Jason & the Scorchers, Waylon Jennings, George Jones, Bon Jovi, Doug Kershaw, Kris Kristofferson, Nicolette Larson, Los Lobos, John Mellencamp, Vince Neil, Willie Nelson, Tom Petty and the Heartbreakers, Bonnie Raitt, Steppenwolf, Taj Mahal, Stevie Ray Vaughan, Joe Walsh, Neil Young, X, The Unforgiven	The Grateful Dead, Bob Dylan and Tom Petty and the Heartbreakers joined via satellite from Rich Stadium in Buffalo, NY
Farm Aid III	September 19, 1987	Lincoln, Nebraska	Memorial Stadium	Alex Harvey, Emmylou Harris, Steppenwolf, Vince Gill, William Lee Golden & The Goldens, Lyle Lovett, John Denver, Lou Reed, John Mellencamp, Neil Young, Bandaloo Doctors, Joe Walsh, Willie Nelson, The Unforgiven	The Grateful Dead joined via satellite from Madison Square Garden
Farm Aid 1989	1989	Various (as part of a tour of Willie Nelson in 16 US cities)	Various (as part of a tour of Willie Nelson in 16 US cities)	Willie Nelson	Farm Aid President Willie Nelson took Farm Aid on the road for 16 of his own show dates
Farm Aid IV	April 7, 1990	Indianapolis, Indiana	Hoosier Dome	Bonnie Raitt, John Mellencamp, John Hiatt, Carl Perkins, Arlo Guthrie, Gorky Park, Garth Brooks, John Denver, Bill Monroe, Alan Jackson, Asleep at the Wheel, Jackson Browne, Bruce Hornsby, Poco, Elton John, William Lee Golden & The Goldens, Lou Reed, Don Henley, Taj Mahal, Crosby, Stills, Nash & Young, Neil Young, Willie Nelson, Guns N' Roses, KT Oslin, Iggy Pop, Henry Lee Summer, Roadmaster	Steven Adler's last show with Guns N' Roses and participation of rock-band from U.S.S.R. "Gorky Park"
Farm Aid V	March 14, 1992	Irving, Texas	Texas Stadium	Arlo Guthrie, Asleep At The Wheel, Kentucky Headhunters, Texas Tornados, Bandaloo Doctors, Bonnie Raitt, Little Village, Tracy Chapman, Lynyrd Skynyrd, William Lee Golden & The Goldens, Petra, Paul Simon, Mary Chapin Carpenter, The Highwaymen, Lorrie Morgan, Ricky Van Shelton, Willie Nelson, Neil Young, John Mellencamp	
Farm Aid VI	April 24, 1993	Ames, Iowa	Jack Trice Stadium	Arlo Guthrie, Asleep At The Wheel, The Jayhawks, Jann Arden, Lyle Lovett, Johnny Cash, Neil Young, Ricky Van Shelton, John Mellencamp, Willie Nelson, Kentucky Headhunters, Marty Stuart, Charlie Daniels Band, Martina McBride, Bruce Hornsby, Bryan Adams, Ringo Starr, Black 47, The Highwaymen, Dwight Yoakam, Mickey Newbury	
Farm Aid VII	September 18, 1994	New Orleans, Louisiana	Louisiana Superdome	Neville Brothers, Spin Doctors, Gin Blossoms, John Conlee, Kris Kristofferson, Willie Nelson, Neil Young & Crazy Horse, Deana Carter, Shaver, Al Hirt, Pete Fountain, David Allan Coe, Titty Bingo	
Farm Aid '95: 10th Anniversary	October 1, 1995	Louisville, Kentucky	Cardinal Stadium	Hootie and the Blowfish, Dave Matthews Band, BlackHawk, John Conlee, The Supersuckers, Steve Earle, Willie Nelson, John Mellencamp, Neil Young	The 10th Anniversary of Farm Aid
Farm Aid '96	October 12, 1996	Columbia, South Carolina	Williams-Brice Stadium	Hootie and the Blowfish, Marshall Chapman, Beach Boys, Son Volt, Robert Earl Keen, Martina McBride, John Conlee, Jewel, Willie Nelson, John Mellencamp, Neil Young	
Farm Aid '97	October 4, 1997	Tinley Park, Illinois	Tweeter Center	Willie Nelson, Neil Young, John Fogerty, Beck, Dave Matthews Band, Billy Ray Cyrus, Steve Earle, The V-Roys, Mary Cutrufello, The Allman Brothers Band, Chris Knight	
Farm Aid '98	October 3, 1998	Tinley Park, Illinois	Tweeter Center	Willie Nelson, Phish, Neil Young, John Mellencamp, Steve Earle, Del McCoury Band, Wilco	
Farm Aid '99	September 12, 1999	Bristow, Virginia	Nissan Pavilion	Susan Tedeschi, Keb' Mo', Deana Carter, Barenaked Ladies, Dave Matthews Band, John Mellencamp, Willie Nelson, Neil Young	
Farm Aid 2000	September 17, 2000	Bristow, Virginia	Nissan Pavilion	Crosby, Stills, Nash & Young, Arlo Guthrie, Sawyer Brown, Alan Jackson, Travis Tritt, North Mississippi Allstars, Barenaked Ladies, Tipper Gore, Willie Nelson	The 15th Anniversary of Farm Aid
Farm Aid 2001: A Concert for America	September 29, 2001	Noblesville, Indiana	Verizon Wireless Music Center	Willie Nelson, Neil Young, John Mellencamp, Dave Matthews, Doobie Brothers, Martina McBride	
Farm Aid '02	September 21, 2002	Burgettstown, Pennsylvania	Post-Gazette Pavilion	Willie Nelson, Neil Young, John Mellencamp, Dave Matthews, Keith Urban, Lee Ann Womack, Kid Rock, Gillian Welch, Duane Cahill, Kenny Wayne Shepherd with Double Trouble, The Drive-By Truckers, Los Lonely Boys, Anthony Smith	
Farm Aid '03	September 7, 2003	Columbus, Ohio	Germain Amphitheater	Willie Nelson, John Mellencamp, Dave Matthews, Neil Young and Crazy Horse, Emmylou Harris, Hootie & the Blowfish, Los Lonely Boys, Sheryl Crow, Brooks & Dunn, Titty Bingo, Trick Pony, Billy Bob Thornton, Daniel Lanois	
Farm Aid '04	September 18, 2004	Auburn, Washington	White River Amphitheatre	Willie Nelson, Neil Young, John Mellencamp, Dave Matthews, Lucinda Williams, Steve Earle, Jerry Lee Lewis, Trick Pony, Tony Coleman, Blue Merle, Tegan and Sara, Kate Voegele, Kitty Jerry, Marc Broussard	
Farm Aid 2005: 20th Anniversary	September 18, 2005	Tweeter Center in Tinley Park, Illinois	First Midwest Bank Amphitheatre	Willie Nelson, John Mellencamp, Neil Young, Dave Matthews, Arlo Guthrie, Buddy Guy, Congressman Collin Peterson and the Second Amendments, Drew Davis Band, Elizabeth Rainey, Emmylou Harris, James McMurtry, Jimmy Sturr & His Orchestra, John Mayer, Kate Voegele, Kathleen Edwards, Kenny Chesney, Los Lonely Boys, Shannon Brown, Supersuckers, Susan Tedeschi, Widespread Panic, Wilco, Barack Obama	The 20th Anniversary of Farm Aid
Farm Aid 2006	September 30, 2006	Camden, New Jersey	Tweeter Center	Willie Nelson, John Mellencamp, Neil Young, Dave Matthews, Jerry Lee Lewis with Roy Head, Los Lonely Boys, Arlo Guthrie, Gov't Mule, Steve Earle and Allison Moorer, Steel Pulse, Shelby Lynne, Nitty Gritty Dirt Band, Jimmy Sturr & his Orchestra, Pauline Reese, Danielle Evin	
Farm Aid 2007: A Homegrown Festival	September 9, 2007	New York City	Randall's Island	Willie Nelson, John Mellencamp, Neil Young and Dave Matthews with Merle Haggard, Ray Price, Billy Joe Shaver, Tim Reynolds, Gregg Allman, The Allman Brothers Band, Counting Crows, Matisyahu, Guster, The Derek Trucks Band, Warren Haynes, Supersuckers, The Ditty Bops, Montgomery Gentry, Jimmy Sturr, Danielle Evin, Jesse Lenat, Pauline Reese, Paula Nelson, Titty Bingo, 40 Points	The Concert was recorded in High Definition to be broadcast on HDNet as a 2 Hour Special highlighting many of the performances from the Allman Brothers and Counting Crows to John Mellencamp and Willie Nelson.
Farm Aid 2008	September 20, 2008	Mansfield, Massachusetts	Comcast Center	Willie Nelson, John Mellencamp, Neil Young, Dave Matthews and Tim Reynolds with Jerry Lee Lewis, Kenny Chesney, The Pretenders, moe., Arlo Guthrie, Steve Earle, Nation Beat, Grace Potter and the Nocturnals, Jakob Dylan and The Gold Mountain Rebels, Danielle Evin, Jamey Johnson, Jesse Lenat, Will Dailey, One Flew South, The Elms	
Farm Aid 2009	October 4, 2009	Maryland Heights, Missouri	Verizon Wireless Amphitheater	Willie Nelson, John Mellencamp, Neil Young, Dave Matthews and Tim Reynolds with Jamey Johnson, Jason Mraz, Phosphorescent, Wilco, Will Dailey	
Farm Aid 2010: 25th Anniversary	October 2, 2010	Milwaukee, Wisconsin	Miller Park	Willie Nelson, John Mellencamp, Dave Matthews & Tim Reynolds, Neil Young, Jeff Tweedy, Kenny Chesney, Jason Mraz, Norah Jones, Band of Horses, Amos Lee, Robert Francis, The BoDeans, Jamey Johnson	The 25th Anniversary of Farm Aid
Farm Aid 2011	August 13, 2011	Kansas City, Kansas	Livestrong Sporting Park	Willie Nelson, John Mellencamp, Neil Young, Dave Matthews, Jason Mraz, Jamey Johnson, Jakob Dylan, Lukas Nelson & Promise of the Real, Will Dailey & The Rivals, Billy Joe Shaver, Robert Francis, Ray Price, Rebecca Pidgeon, Hearts of Darkness, John Trudell, The Blackwood Quartet	
Farm Aid 2012	September 22, 2012	Hershey, Pennsylvania	Hersheypark Stadium	Willie Nelson, John Mellencamp, Neil Young, Kenny Chesney, Dave Matthews & Tim Reynolds, Jack Johnson, ALO, Pegi Young & The Survivors, Lukas Nelson & Promise of the Real, Grace Potter & the Nocturnals, Dale Watson, Jamey Johnson	
Farm Aid 2013	September 21, 2013	Saratoga Springs, New York	Saratoga Performing Arts Center	Willie Nelson, Neil Young, Pete Seeger, John Mellencamp, Dave Matthews & Tim Reynolds, Jack Johnson, Jamey Johnson, Kacey Musgraves, Toad the Wet Sprocket, Sasha Dobson, Amos Lee, Carlene Carter, Lukas Nelson & Promise of the Real, Will Dailey, Bahamas, Pegi Young & The Survivors, Jesse Lenat, Insects vs Robots, The Blackwood Quartet	
Farm Aid 2014	September 13, 2014	Raleigh, North Carolina	Walnut Creek Amphitheatre	Willie Nelson, Neil Young, John Mellencamp, Dave Matthews & Tim Reynolds, Jack White, Gary Clarke Jr., Preservation Hall Jazz Band, Jamey Johnson, Delta Rae, Todd Snider, Raelyn Nelson Band, Carlene Carter, ~~Pegi Young & The Survivors~~, Lukas Nelson & Promise of the Real, Insects vs Robots	
Farm Aid 2015	September 19, 2015	Chicago	FirstMerit Bank Pavilion at Northerly Island	Willie Nelson, Neil Young, John Mellencamp, Dave Matthews & Tim Reynolds, Imagine Dragons, Jack Johnson, Kacey Musgraves, Old Crow Medicine Show, Jamey Johnson, Mavis Staples, Lukas Nelson & Promise of the Real, Holly Williams, Insects vs Robots, Blackwood Quartet	The 30th Anniversary of Farm Aid
Farm Aid 2016	September 17, 2016	Bristow, Virginia	Jiffy Lube Live	Willie Nelson, Neil Young, John Mellencamp, Dave Matthews & Tim Reynolds, Alabama Shakes, Sturgill Simpson, Nathaniel Rateliff & The Night Sweats, Jamey Johnson (with special guest Alison Krauss), Margo Price, Lukas Nelson & Promise of the Real, Insects vs Robots, Ian Mellencamp, The Wisdom Indian Dancers, Star Swain	
Farm Aid 2017	September 16, 2017	Burgettstown, Pennsylvania	KeyBank Pavilion	Willie Nelson, Neil Young, John Mellencamp, Dave Matthews & Tim Reynolds, Jack Johnson, The Avett Brothers, Sheryl Crow, Jamey Johnson, Blackberry Smoke, Valerie June, Lukas Nelson & Promise of the Real, Insects vs Robots	
Farm Aid 2018	September 22, 2018	Hartford, Connecticut	Xfinity Theatre	Willie Nelson, Neil Young, John Mellencamp, Dave Matthews & Tim Reynolds, Chris Stapleton, Kacey Musgraves, Sturgill Simpson, Nathaniel Rateliff & The Night Sweats, Jamey Johnson, Margo Price, Lukas Nelson & Promise of the Real, Particle Kid	
Farm Aid 2019	September 21, 2019	East Troy, Wisconsin	Alpine Valley Music Theatre	Willie Nelson, Neil Young, John Mellencamp, Dave Matthews & Tim Reynolds, Bonnie Raitt, Luke Combs, Nathaniel Rateliff & the Night Sweats, Jamey Johnson, Margo Price, Lukas Nelson & Promise of the Real, Yola, Tanya Tucker, Jamestown Revival, Particle Kid, Ian Mellencamp, Wisdom Indian Dancers, Ho-Chunk Thundercloud Singers	This was Combs' first show at Farm Aid.
At Home with Farm Aid	April 11, 2020	Various	Entertainers' homes	Black Pumas, Bonnie Raitt, Boz Scaggs, Brandi Carlile, Chris Stapleton, Dave Matthews, Edie Brickell, Jack Johnson, Jamey Johnson, Jon Batiste, John Mellencamp, Kelsey Waldon, Willie Nelson with Lukas and Micah Nelson, Neil Young, The Record Company, Valerie June & The War and Treaty.	Due to Covid artists streamed their performances from home, Neil Young would miss the next 2 years due to concerns from the virus
Farm Aid 2021	September 26, 2021	Hartford, Connecticut	Xfinity Theatre	Willie Nelson, John Mellencamp, ~~Sturgill Simpson~~, Dave Matthews & Tim Reynolds, Tyler Childers, Margo Price, Nataniel Rateliff & the Night Sweats, Bettye LaVette, Jamey Johnson, Lukas Nelson & Promise of the Real, Allison Russell, Particle Kid, Ian Mellencamp & Wisdom Indian Dancers	
Farm Aid 2022	September 24, 2022	Raleigh, North Carolina	Walnut Creek Amphitheatre	Willie Nelson, John Mellencamp, Dave Matthews & Tim Reynolds, Margo Price, Chris Stapleton, Sheryl Crow, Lukas Nelson & Promise of the Real, Particle Kid, Allison Russell, Charley Crockett, Brittney Spencer, Wisdom Indian Dancers	
Farm Aid 2023	September 23, 2023	Noblesville, Indiana	Ruoff Music Center	Willie Nelson, Bob Dylan, Neil Young, John Mellencamp, Dave Matthews & Tim Reynolds, Margo Price, Bobby Weir & Wolf Bros, Nathaniel Rateliff & the Night Sweats, Lukas Nelson & Promise of the Real, Allison Russell, the String Cheese Incident, Particle Kid, The Black Opry featuring Lori Rayne, Tylar Bryant and Kyshona, The Jim Irsay Band featuring Ann Wilson, Clayton Anderson, Wisdom Indian Dancers, Native Pride Productions	Featured an unannounced appearance of Bob Dylan. This was Dylan's first appearance at Farm Aid since 1986.
Farm Aid 2024	September 21, 2024	Saratoga Springs, New York	Broadview Stage, Saratoga Performing Arts Center	Willie Nelson, Neil Young, John Mellencamp, Dave Matthews & Tim Reynolds, Mavis Staples, Nathaniel Rateliff & the Night Sweats, Lukas Nelson with The Travelin' McCourys, Charley Crockett, Joy Oladokun, Southern Avenue, Cassandra Lewis, Jesse Welles	
Farm Aid 2025	September 20, 2025	Minneapolis, Minnesota	Huntington Bank Stadium	Willie Nelson, Neil Young, Bob Dylan, John Mellencamp, Dave Matthews & Tim Reynolds, Margo Price, Kenny Chesney, Billy Strings, Nathaniel Rateliff & the Night Sweats, Lukas Nelson, Trampled By Turtles, Wynonna Judd, Steve Earle, Waxahatchee, Eric Burton of Black Pumas, Jesse Welles	40th Anniversary
Farm Aid 2026	September 26, 2026	Virginia Beach, Virginia	Veterans United Home Loans Amphitheater	Willie Nelson and Family, Neil Young and the Chrome Hearts, John Mellencamp, Dave Matthews and Tim Reynolds, Margo Price, Nathaniel Ratleliff, Turnpike Troubadours, Lukas Nelson, Mike Campbell and The Dirty Knobs, Jesse Welles, Ty Myers, Sierra Ferrel, Mon Rovia, I'm With Her, Amythyst Kiah, Lily Meola, Chris Pierce, Wisdom Indian Dancers	Ty Myers was a special guest during Willie Nelson and Neil Young's 2 day tour just prior to Farm Aid and was added to the line up.

== Board of directors ==
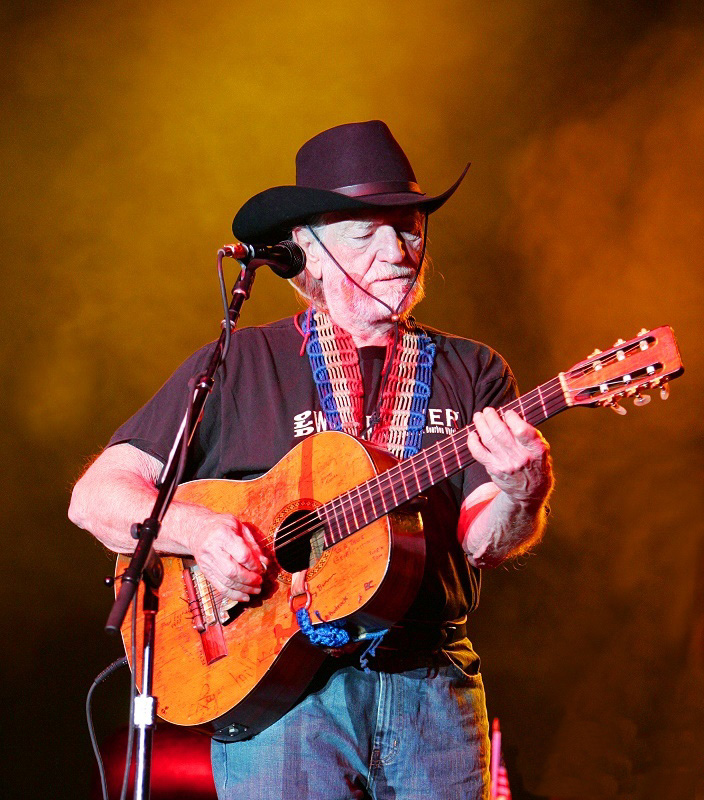
Willie Nelson

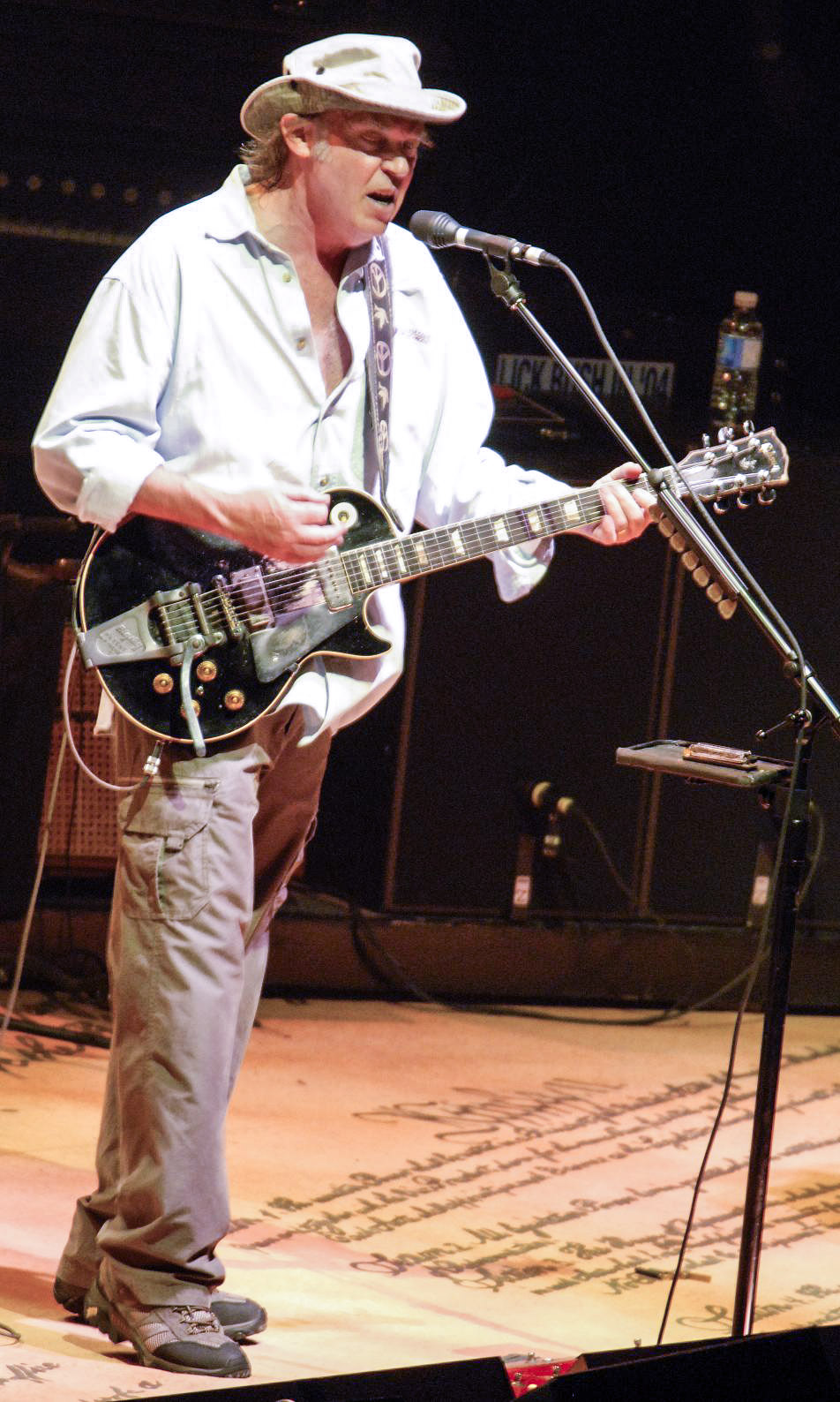
Neil Young

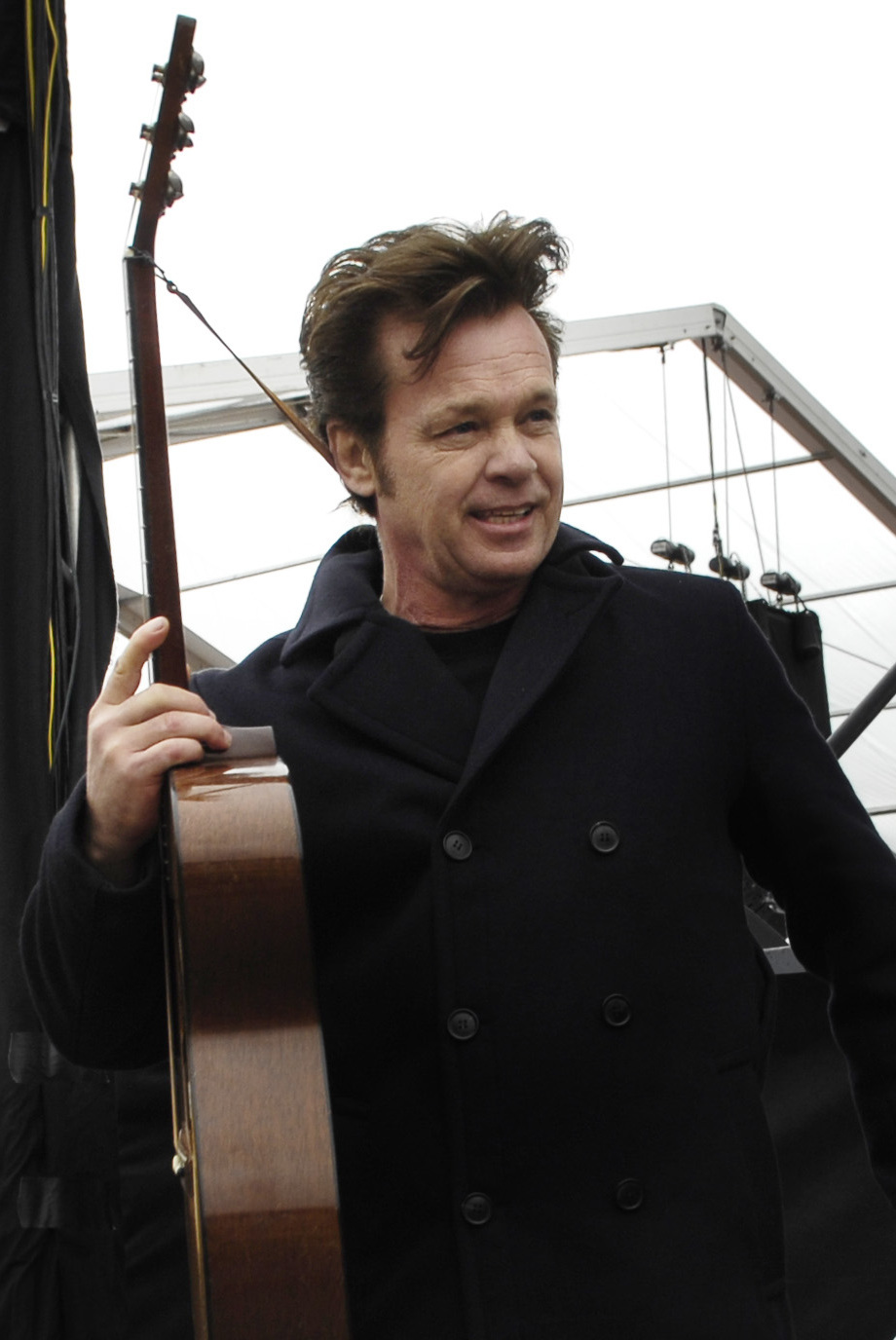
John Mellencamp

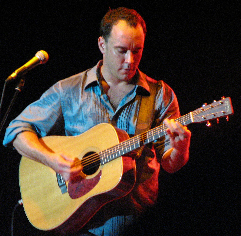
Dave Matthews

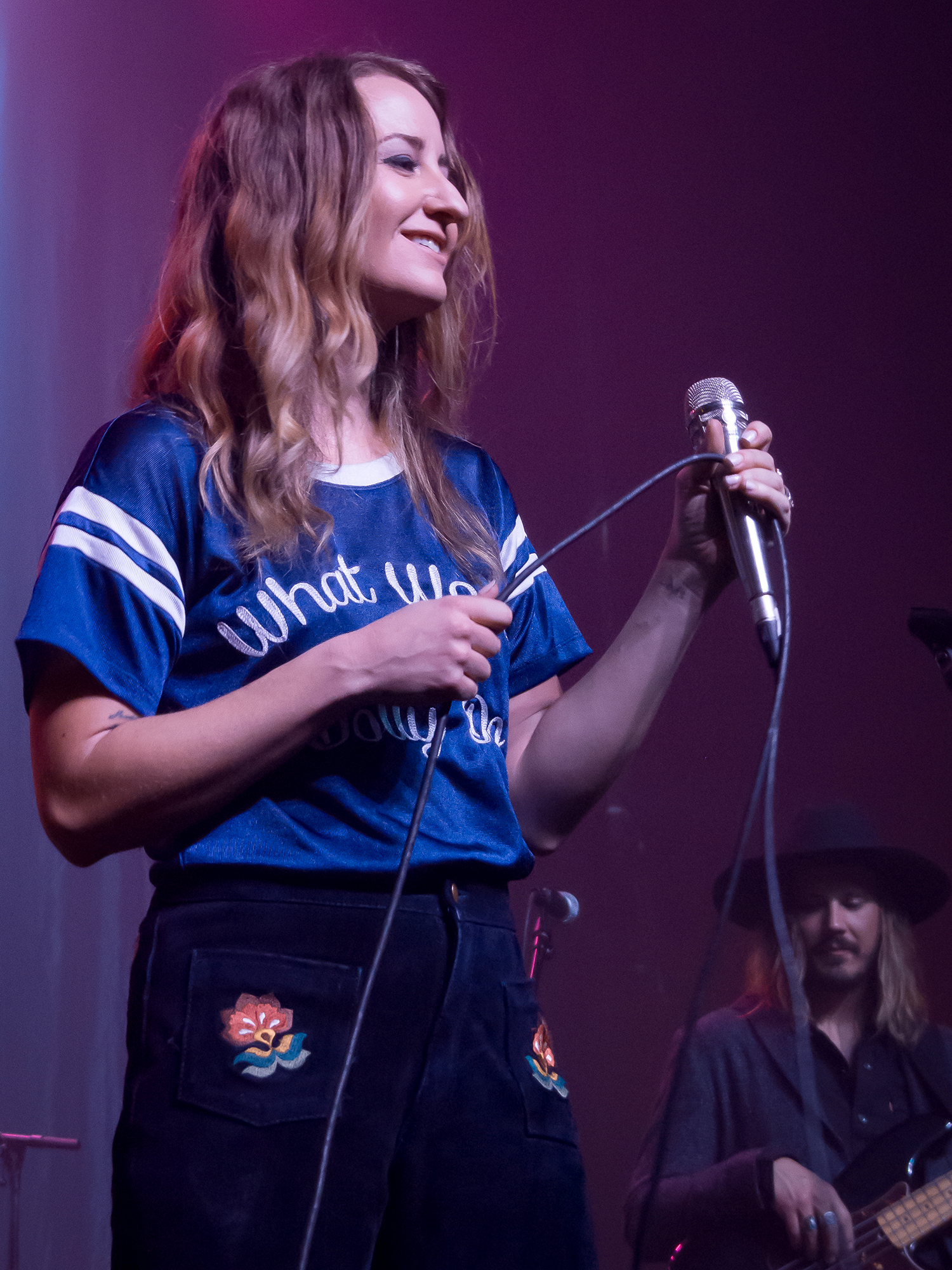
Margo Price

== See also ==
- 1980s farm crisis
- Farmers' suicides in the United States
- List of highest-grossing benefit concerts
