= Down to the Wire =

Down to the Wire may refer to:

== Books ==
- Down to the Wire: UPI's Fight for Survival by Gregory Gordon and Ronald E. Cohen about United Press International

== Music ==
- "Down to the Wire", a song on the album Decade by Neil Young
- "Down to the Wire", a song on the album Demoz by Marcella Detroit
- "Down to the Wire", a song on the album Far from Over by Vijay Iyer
- "Down to the Wire", a song on the album Greatest Hints by Michael Stanley Band
- "Down to the Wire", a song on the album Inside Out by Fates Warning
- "Down to the Wire", a song on the album Light of the Fearless by Hybrid
- "Down to the Wire", a song on the album Oceanview Motel by Mae Moore
- "Down to the Wire", a song on the compilation album Rarities by The Living End
- "Down to the Wire", a song on the album Red Earth by Crash Vegas
- "Down to the Wire", a song on the album Resilient by Running Wild
- "Down to the Wire", a song on the album Stop the World by Ghost Dance
- "Down to the Wire", a song on the album The Grapes of Wrath by The Grapes of Wrath
- "Down to the Wire", a song on the album Under the Gun by Poco
- Down to the Wire, an album by Paul Peterson
- Down to the Wire: 4th Ave Edition, an album by Mozzy

== Television ==
- "Down to the Wire", an episode in season 2 of Airline
- "Down to the Wire", an episode in season 6 of CSI: Miami
- "Down to the Wire", an episode in season 1 of Jade Fever
- "Down to the Wire", an episode in season 1 of The Apprentice
- "Down to the Wire", an episode in season 14 of The Biggest Loser
- "Down to the Wire", an episode in season 16 of The Challenge
- "Down to the Wire", an episode in season 2 of Top Shot
