= Jonah Koslen =

American singer-songwriter and musician (born 1952)

- Born: February 9, 1952 (age 74)
- Origin: Cleveland, Ohio, United States
- Genres: Rock
- Occupation: Singer-songwriter
- Instruments: Guitar, vocals

Jonah Koslen is an American singer-songwriter and musician best known for his work with the Michael Stanley Band and Breathless in the 1970s and 1980s.

== Biography ==
After graduating from Beachwood High School, Koslen joined the Cleveland, Ohio-based band, Snake Eyes, with former Eli Radish Band bassist Danny Sheridan. In 1974, he joined with Michael Stanley, Daniel Pecchio, formerly of Glass Harp, and Tommy Dobeck to form The Michael Stanley Band. During his tenure with the band, they released three albums for Epic Records and became popular in Northeast Ohio. Sharing songwriting duties with Stanley, Koslen contributed two of the group's classic songs: "Strike Up the Band" and "Nothing's Gonna Change My Mind".

Koslen left the Michael Stanley Band in 1977 and formed the band Breathless the following year. Breathless consisted of Koslen, bassist Bob Benjamin, drummer Kevin Valentine, percussionist Rodney Psyka, guitarist Alan Greene and keyboardist Mark Avsec, formerly with Wild Cherry. Signed to EMI America Records, the group released their debut album Breathless, produced by Don Gehman, in July 1979. Following the album's release, Breathless toured as an opening act, including a dozen shows opening for Kiss. The single, "Takin' It Back", scratched the Billboard Hot 100 at No. 92, but the album did not chart. With support from Cleveland radio station WMMS, Breathless became a popular act locally, headlining Blossom Music Center in June 1980. The band released its second album, Nobody Leaves This Song Alive in October 1980. Again, the album received airplay in Northeast Ohio but failed to catch on nationally. Breathless disbanded in 1981, with Avsec and Valentine joining Donnie Iris' band "The Cruisers".

Koslen formed another band, Jonah Koslen and the Heroes, that released the album Aces, in 1983, and the albums Orange and Agora Live, but they soon broke up. After that Koslen moved to California and worked on various music projects. He briefly reunited with Michael Stanley in 1993 for the album The Ghost Poets.

== Discography ==
=== Albums ===
Michael Stanley Band

- 1975: You Break It...You Bought It!
- 1976: Ladies' Choice
- 1977: Stagepass
- 1992: Right Back at Ya (1971–1983)
- 1997: Misery Loves Company: More of the Best 1975–1983

Solo

- 1978: Back Tracks
- 2008: Telling on Myself

Breathless

- 1979: Breathless
- 1980: Nobody Leaves This Song Alive
- 1993: Picture This...The Best of Breathless

Jonah Koslen and the Heroes

- 1983: Aces
- 1984: Orange
- Agora Live

The Ghost Poets

- 1993: The Ghost Poets

== Other sources ==
- Adams, Deanna. Rock 'n' Roll and the Cleveland Connection (2002): pp. 261–268, pp. 416–418
