= Eli Radish Band =

American band

- Genres: Outlaw Country, Rock

The Eli Radish Band was a Cleveland, Ohio-based band active from 1968 to 1973. They were closely tied to the development of the outlaw country and alt-country music genres.

The group signed with Capitol Records in 1969 and released its only album I Didn't Raise My Boy To Be A Soldier, which featured tracks with anti-war messages ironically reminiscent of World War I and II era patriotic music. After recording for Capitol Records and Olympia Records, the group eventually disbanded in 1973.

== Post-Breakup ==
Eli Radish's founder and bassist Danny Sheridan continued to compose and produce songs for David Crosby, Scarlet Rivera, actress Amy Madigan and other CD, TV and film projects. He helped to launch his then girlfriend Nina Blackwood's MTV career. Sheridan continued to produce her national radio shows and oversee her SiriusXM career. He co-hosted a talk show on 97.1 KLSX in Los Angeles and is a frequent speaker on various songwriter and music industry panels, often performing for charity events including Farm Aid and the Los Angeles Musician's Picnic.

Eli Radish incorporated the drumming skills of Skip Heil from South Euclid, Ohio in its inception, through its recording years and into the final days when members went their separate ways. Skip now resides in the wine country of northern California, continuing his songwriting activities. Rick "Muskrat" Kennedy who replaced original singer Ken <The Rev> Frak, plays acoustic solo shows at various resorts. Pedal steel player/guitarist Tom "The Foss" Foster tours the U.S. with several groups, and violinist "Little" Eva Karasik, who has recorded on a number of CDs including Jorma Kaukonen's Quah, now performs with the San Francisco Opera.

In 1969, Eli Radish signed with rock and roll promoter Roger Abramson. During these years throughout the 1970s, Roger Abramson included the band on concerts with many nationally known groups, such as The Doors and Country Joe and the Fish.

When David Allan Coe began writing a string of hits that included “Would You Lay with Me (In a Field of Stone)” for a then teenage Tanya Tucker, and the tune, “Take This Job And Shove It”, Coe called on Sheridan to join him on his tours. Coe's hits include “You Never Even Call Me By My Name”, “Willie, Waylon, And Me” and "Longhaired Redneck".

== Discography ==
- I Didn't Raise My Boy To Be A Soldier (LP, Album) (1969) Capitol Records
