= Greatest Hints =

Studio album by Michael Stanley Band
- Released: 1979
- Recorded: February–March 1979
- Genre: Rock
- Length: 41:38
- Label: Arista
- Producer: Harry Maslin

Michael Stanley Band chronology
Cabin Fever (1978)	Greatest Hints (1979)	Heartland (1980)

Greatest Hints is an album by the Cleveland, Ohio-based Michael Stanley Band that was released on Arista Records in 1979 and reached #148 on the Billboard magazine charts. The album cover art prominently features the members of the band in black-and-white photographs. This was a direct attempt to introduce the world to Michael and his bandmates.

== Album name ==
At this point the band was almost five years old and had not yet been able to crack into the top third (at least #50) of the all-important Billboard magazine charts, nor would they ever. Their highest-charting album would be their last for EMI America, the ironically titled You Can't Fight Fashion (1983). There have been many opinions over the succeeding decades as to why this was not accomplished, but in any event the band had failed to secure a foothold outside of the Midwest market. This might have been owing to a lack of promotion by Arista, or perhaps a lack of success in the charts by the band or bad timing on a rich landscape of crowded rock groups vying for national attention.

The band was extremely popular in rock-heavy Cleveland and the state of Ohio in general, parts of the Midwest including Michigan, Pennsylvania and St. Louis, but its popularity did not generally extend to other parts of the country. The band embodied so many values of the Cleveland mentality. Their constant touring and performing, and reputation as a working man's band, would in the 1980s allow MSB to set attendance records at the Cleveland Agora and Richfield Coliseum that stand to this day. In essence, the title 'Greatest Hints' was the band's way of poking fun at their inability to reach their musical career goals despite the fact that on the last album, Cabin Fever, they worked with legendary producer Robert John Mutt Lange, who would go on to produce AC/DC, Billy Ocean, Foreigner, Shania Twain and Def Leppard. The name is also a play on the music industry standard of bands having greatest hits albums after producing several studio albums. The band to this point had already produced three studio albums, You Break It... You Bought It (1975), Ladies' Choice (1976), and Cabin Fever (1978), along with the live Stagepass (1977) album.

== Kevin Raleigh ==
This MSB (Michael Stanley Band) album is notable for the introduction of keyboardist and lyricist Kevin Raleigh. Raleigh would eventually join Stanley as the main songwriter of the band, and he wrote "He Can't Love You", "Save a Little Piece for Me", "When Your Heart Says It's Right", "You're My Love" and many other MSB classics. Raleigh provided a sharp contrast to Stanley's low register singing with his soaring high vocals and harmonies, which would become a hallmark of the group.

== The songs ==
"Beautiful Lies", "Lights Out" and "Promises" would become fan favorites and give the group the unique harmonic melodies with which they became synonymous. There are saxophone licks featured for the first time on Stanley's "Down to the Wire" and the Holland-Dozier-Holland cover "Back in My Arms Again" by Gismondi, which would become a feature of later hits on subsequent albums by MSB. The songs on this album are decidedly more catchy and hook filled than the albums that preceded this offering. The ballads and the love songs are in supreme form, and we have the first taste of what the MSB style in the future would hold.

== Track listing ==
No.	Title	Writer(s)	Length
1.	"Last Night"	Kevin Raleigh, Michael Stanley	3:42
2.	"Don't Lead with Your Love"	Stanley	4:17
3.	"Promises"	Raleigh	4:01
4.	"Down to the Wire"	Stanley	4:12
5.	"No Turning Back"	Raleigh	4:55
6.	"Back in My Arms Again"	Holland-Dozier-Holland	3:42
7.	"Beautiful Lies"	Pelander, Stanley	4:39
8.	"Lights Out"	Pelander, Stanley	4:25
9.	"Hold Your Fire"	Raleigh	4:25
10.	"We're Not Strangers Anymore"	Pelander, Stanley	3:45
Total length:			41:38

== Personnel ==
- Michael Stanley – lead and backing vocals, electric and acoustic guitars, percussion
- Gary Markasky – vocals, lead electric guitar, acoustic guitar
- Bob Pelander – vocals, grand piano, clavinet, synthesizer
- Kevin Raleigh – vocals, organ, Fender Rhodes, synthesizer, chimes
- Michael Gismondi – bass, saxophone, percussion
- Tommy Dobeck – drums, percussion
