= To All the Girls... =

Studio album by Willie Nelson
- Released: October 15, 2013
- Genre: Country
- Length: 65:55
- Label: Legacy
- Producer: Buddy Cannon

Willie Nelson chronology
Let's Face the Music and Dance (2013)	To All the Girls... (2013)	Band of Brothers (2014)

Singles from For All the Girls...
- 1. "From Here to the Moon and Back" Released: August 6, 2013; 2. "Grandma's Hands" Released: August 6, 2013; 3. "It Won't Be Long" Released: September 24, 2013; 4. "Somewhere Between" Released: October 1, 2013; 5. "Have You Ever Seen the Rain" Released: July 24, 2019

To All the Girls... is the 62nd studio album by country music singer-songwriter Willie Nelson, released on October 15, 2013, by Legacy Recordings. The tracks consist of duets recorded by Nelson with female singers, mostly from the country music genre. The album is named after the song "To All the Girls I've Loved Before", which had been a hit for Nelson and Julio Iglesias when they recorded it in 1985.

The week of its release, the album entered Billboard's Top Country Albums chart at number two, marking Nelson's highest position on the chart since 1989. It also peaked at number nine on the Billboard 200, becoming his first top ten album on that chart since 1982.

== Recording ==
The album consists of a collection of duets featuring Nelson along with a variety of female singers, including prominent country singers (Dolly Parton, Miranda Lambert, Loretta Lynn, Carrie Underwood, Rosanne Cash, Wynonna Judd), Americana and alternative country singers (The Secret Sisters, Brandi Carlile, Alison Krauss, Shelby Lynne, Emmylou Harris), prominent singers mostly associated with other genres (Sheryl Crow, Mavis Staples, Norah Jones), singers mostly known for being the daughters of country artists (Melonie Cannon, daughter of Buddy Cannon; Tina Rose, daughter of Leon Russell; and Nelson's own daughter Paula Nelson), and Nelson protégée Lily Meola.

== Release and reception ==
The album was released on October 15, 2013 on Legacy Recordings.

The first single "From Here to the Moon and Back", a duet with Dolly Parton that she wrote for the 2012 movie Joyful Noise, was released on August 2, 2013. (The song also appeared on Parton's concurrent album Blue Smoke.) It was followed by the release of the single "Grandma's Hands", with Mavis Staples, on August 6. "It Won't Be Long", featuring the Secret Sisters was released on September 24; while "Somewhere Between" with Loretta Lynn was released on October 1.

Upon its full release, on October 15, 2013; the album entered Billboard's Top Country Albums at number two. It marked Nelson's highest position on the chart since the release of his 1989 album A Horse Called Music, and it extended his record to a total of 46 top ten albums on the country charts. Nelson scored as well his second top ten album on the Billboard 200, with the release entering at number nine.

Professional ratings
Aggregate scores
Source	Rating
Metacritic	71/100
Review scores
Source	Rating
AllMusic	3.5/5 stars
The Austin Chronicle	3/5 stars
Mojo	3/5 stars
Q	4/5 stars
Record Collector	4/5 stars
Rolling Stone	3/5 stars
The Telegraph	4/5 stars
Tom Hull – on the Web	B+
Uncut	7/10

The Seattle Post-Intelligencer called the release "a wonderful album" composed by "great material", performed with "style and grace". The Telegraph rated it with four stars out of five, qualifying the diversity of music genres contained on the recordings as "impressive". The review described Nelson's guitar playing "sweet and distinctive as ever", and remarked that his voice was "holding up well". AllMusic delivered a favorable review, rating the album with three-and-a-half stars out of five. The website defined the tracks as "assured, easy, impeccably tasteful work from (Nelson) and his partners", but stated that the seventy-minute length "make(s) the album feel a little samey".

Rolling Stone offered a mixed review, rating the album with three stars out of five. The review noted that "several of the pairings [...] lament unions that couldn't work", while it remarked that Nelson "holds his unmistakable own throughout". Record Collector rated the release with four stars, calling it a "fine addition" to Nelson's collection of duets. The Associated Press felt that the duets were "custom-made for the download age", alleging that Nelson's usual audience would not "connect with all 16 songs", calling the set "too eclectic and too inconsistent". It also remarked that "plenty of gold nuggets shine through for those willing to pick through the miscues and throwaways". Roughstock rated it with four stars and called the album "a delight" with "18 tracks of fantastic duets". The review aggregator website Metacritic gave the album a Metascore of 72/100, based on six reviews.

== Track listing ==
No.	Title	Writer(s)	Duet partner	Length
1.	"From Here to the Moon and Back"	Dolly Parton	Dolly Parton	4:01
2.	"She Was No Good for Me"	Waylon Jennings	Miranda Lambert	3:47
3.	"It Won't Be Very Long"	Willie Nelson; Buddy Cannon	The Secret Sisters	2:36
4.	"Please Don't Tell Me How the Story Ends"	Kris Kristofferson	Rosanne Cash	4:18
5.	"Far Away Places"	Joan Whitney; Alex Kramer	Sheryl Crow	4:56
6.	"Bloody Mary Morning"	Willie Nelson	Wynonna Judd	3:05
7.	"Always on My Mind"	Wayne Carson; Johnny Christopher; Mark James	Carrie Underwood	3:55
8.	"Somewhere Between"	Merle Haggard	Loretta Lynn	3:13
9.	"No Mas Amor"	Keith Gattis; Sammy Barrett	Alison Krauss	4:12
10.	"Back To Earth"	Willie Nelson	Melonie Cannon	3:30
11.	"Grandma's Hands"	Bill Withers	Mavis Staples	3:10
12.	"Walkin'"	Willie Nelson	Norah Jones	3:39
13.	"'Til The End of the World"	Vaughn Horton	Shelby Lynne	2:01
14.	"Will You Remember Mine"	Willie Nelson	Lily Meola	4:34
15.	"Dry Lightning"	Bruce Springsteen	Emmylou Harris	4:21
16.	"Making Believe"	Jimmy Work	Brandi Carlile	3:16
17.	"Have You Ever Seen the Rain"	John Fogerty	Paula Nelson	4:38
18.	"After the Fire Is Gone"	L. E. White	Tina Rose	2:43
Total length:				1:05:55

== Personnel ==
- Wayne Benson – mandolin
- Jim "Moose" Brown – Hammond B-3 organ, percussion, piano, Wurlitzer
- Buddy Cannon – acoustic guitar, background vocals
- Melonie Cannon – duet vocals on "Back To Earth"
- Brandi Carlile – duet vocals on "Making Believe"
- Rosanne Cash – duet vocals on "Please Don't Tell Me How the Story Ends"
- Chad Cromwell – drums
- Dennis Crouch – upright bass
- Sheryl Crow – duet vocals on "Far Away Places"
- Fred Eltringham – drums
- Keith Gattis – electric guitar, gut string guitar
- Steve Gibson – electric guitar
- Kevin "Swine" Grantt – upright bass
- Emmylou Harris – duet vocals on "Dry Lightning"
- Steve Herrmann – trumpet
- John Hobbs – Hammond B-3 organ, piano, string arrangements
- Mike Johnson – steel guitar
- Norah Jones – piano and duet vocals on "Walkin'"
- Wynonna Judd – duet vocals on "Bloody Mary Morning"
- Alison Krauss – duet vocals on "No Mas Amor"
- Miranda Lambert – duet vocals on "She Was No Good for Me"
- Loretta Lynn – duet vocals on "Somewhere Between"
- Shelby Lynne – duet vocals on "'Til the End of the World"
- Lily Meola – duet vocals on "Will You Remember Mine"
- The Nashville String Machine – strings
- Lukas Nelson – background vocals
- Paula Nelson – duet vocals on "Have You Ever Seen the Rain"
- Willie Nelson – acoustic guitar, lead vocals
- Dolly Parton – duet vocals on "From Here to the Moon and Back"
- Mickey Raphael – bass harmonica, echo harp, harmonica
- Lyndel Rhodes – harmonica
- Laura Rogers – vocals on "It Won't Be Very Long"
- Lydia Rogers – vocals on "It Won't Be Very Long"
- Tina Rose – duet vocals on "After the Fire Is Gone"
- John Wesley Ryles – background vocals
- Mavis Staples – duet vocals on "Grandma's Hands"
- Bobby Terry – acoustic guitar, electric guitar, gut string guitar
- Dan Tyminski – acoustic guitar, mandolin, background vocals
- Carrie Underwood – duet vocals on "Always on My Mind"
- Tommy White – steel guitar
- Kris Wilkinson – string contractor
- Lonnie Wilson – drums
- Bobby Wood – synthesizer

== Chart performance ==
The week of its release, the album entered Billboard's Top Country Albums chart at number two, marking Nelson's highest position on the chart since 1989, as well as his second top ten album on the Billboard 200, entering at number nine. It is Nelson's 46th top ten debut, the most of any country singers on that chart. It sold 43,000 in its first week. As of January 2014, the album has sold 114,000 copies in the US.

In the UK, the album debuted at No. 72 on the album chart, selling 1,452 copies for the week.

== Charts ==
=== Weekly charts ===
Chart (2013)	Peak position
Australian Albums (ARIA)	129
Belgian Albums (Ultratop Flanders)	176
Belgian Albums (Ultratop Wallonia)	188
Canadian Albums (Billboard)	21
Norwegian Albums (VG-lista)	25
Scottish Albums (Official Charts)	56
Swiss Albums (Schweizer Hitparade)	66
UK Albums (Official Charts)	72
US Billboard 200	9
US Top Country Albums (Billboard)	2

=== Year-end charts ===
Chart (2013)	Position
US Top Country Albums (Billboard)	54
