= Michael Stanley =

American musician (1948–2021)

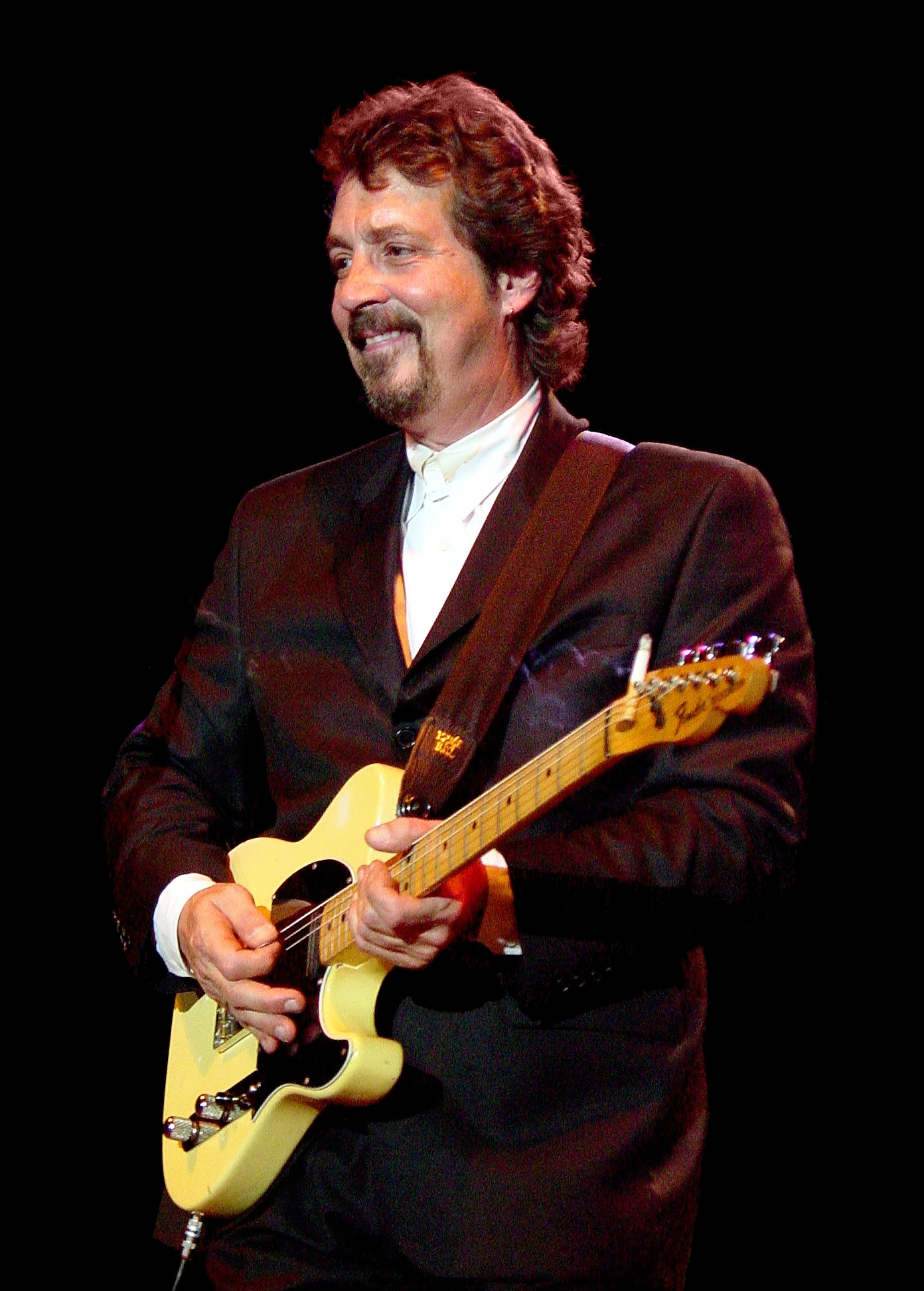
- Stanley performing in 2002

Background information
- Born: Michael Stanley Gee; March 25, 1948
- Origin: Cleveland, Ohio, United States
- Died: March 5, 2021 (aged 72)
- Genres: Rock; folk rock; heartland rock
- Occupations: Singer-songwriter; disc jockey
- Instruments: Guitar; vocals

Michael Stanley (born Michael Stanley Gee; March 25, 1948 – March 5, 2021) was an American singer-songwriter, musician, and radio and television personality. As a solo artist and with the Michael Stanley Band (MSB), and Michael Stanley and the Resonators (MS&R), his brand of heartland rock was popular in Cleveland, Ohio, and around the American Midwest in the 1970s and 1980s.

== Early life, family, and education ==
Michael Stanley Gee graduated from Rocky River High School in 1966. He attended Hiram College on a baseball scholarship and graduated with a bachelor's degree in 1970.

== Career ==
=== Early career ===
While in college, Michael Stanley was in the band Silk (called initially the Tree Stumps), which released an album, Smooth As Raw Silk, on ABC Records in 1969.

A few years after his graduation, while working as a regional manager for a record store chain, Stanley released his first solo album, Michael Stanley, on Tumbleweed Records in 1973. The album was produced by Bill Szymczyk and featured contributions from Joe Walsh, Todd Rundgren, Rick Derringer, and Joe Vitale. Its first song, "Rosewood Bitters," would become a lifetime fixture in Stanley's shows and was later recorded by Walsh in 1985. Stanley's second solo album, Friends and Legends, released later in 1973 on MCA Records, was again produced by Szymczyk and included support from members of Barnstorm and Stephen Stills' Manassas, among others: Walsh, Vitale, Kenny Passarelli, Paul Harris, Joe Lala, Al Perkins, David Sanborn, Dan Fogelberg, and Richie Furay, with J. Geils contributing to the production.

=== Michael Stanley Band ===
The Michael Stanley Band was formed by Stanley in 1974 with singer-songwriter and lead guitarist Jonah Koslen, former Glass Harp bassist Daniel Pecchio and drummer Tommy Dobeck from the band Circus. Several personnel changes over the years, and by 1982, the group had evolved into a seven-piece band.

Nicknamed MSB by their fans, the band set several attendance records at Cleveland area venues, including a record 20,320 at the Richfield Coliseum on July 20, 1979, and a record 40,529 for two Coliseum concerts on December 31, 1981, and January 1, 1982. The band's greatest achievement was a total attendance of 74,404 during a four-night stand at Blossom Music Center on August 25, 26, 30 and 31, 1982.

The group reached the peak of their popularity nationally in 1981 when the single "He Can't Love You" from the album Heartland (written and sung by keyboardist Kevin Raleigh) made the Top 40 (#33 Billboard, #27 Cash Box) and "In the Heartland" from the album North Coast went to #6 on Billboard's Top Tracks chart. Their video for "He Can't Love You" was the 47th video ever played on MTV. The band's last Top 40 hit was "My Town" in 1983. "My Town" has been played by the Ohio State University Marching Band since 1986. The special all-brass and percussion arrangement is a favorite in Ohio Stadium.

The band dissolved in 1987 with 12 farewell shows at the Front Row Theater in Highland Heights, Ohio (suburban Cleveland) during the 1986–87 holiday season.

In 2004, the sketch comedy troupe Last Call Cleveland produced Michael Stanley Superstar: The Unauthorized Autobiography of the Cuyahoga Messiah, a play which parodied Stanley's status as a local celebrity.

Personnel

- Michael Stanley – guitar, vocals
- Jonah Koslen – lead guitar, vocals (1974–77)
- Daniel Pecchio – bass, vocals (1974–79)
- Tommy Dobeck – drums
- Bob Pelander – keyboards (1976–87)
- Gary Markasky – lead guitar (1978–83)
- Kevin Raleigh – keyboards, vocals (1978–87)
- Michael Gismondi – bass (1979–87)
- Rick Bell – saxophone (1982–84)
- Danny Powers – lead guitar (1983–87)

=== Television and radio ===
Stanley was the co-host of PM Magazine on WJW Channel 8 from 1987 to 1990 and its follow-up, Cleveland Tonight, until 1991. He also appeared on The Drew Carey Show, playing himself.

Following a short stint on Cleveland radio station WNCX 98.5, from 1990 until a few weeks before he died in 2021, Stanley was the afternoon drive disc jockey for classic rock radio station WNCX, in Cleveland.

In 1993, he appeared on the Howard Stern Radio Show during one of his Birthday Shows and played “Rosewood Bitters” with Joe Walsh live.

=== Later musical career ===
In addition to his broadcasting career, after the breakup of the Michael Stanley Band, Stanley continued to write songs, record, and perform with bands (often with some former members of MSB), including Michael Stanley and Friends, the Ghost Poets, the Resonators, and Midlife Chryslers. In 2019, he estimated that the Resonators played about 25 shows yearly, many in Northeast Ohio but also "from the East Coast to Atlanta to St. Louis." He released about sixteen more albums on Razor & Tie or his label, Line Level.

== Personal life ==
Stanley was married four times: to Libby Hill Blake, a teacher, from 1970 to 1990, when they divorced; to Mary McCrone, a television producer, for eight years until they divorced in about 2000; to Denise Skinner, a former marketing staffer, from 2002 until her death of cancer in 2011; (Note: A different date for Skinner's death, 2017, is listed in Stanley's Akron Beacon-Journal obituary (compare the 2019 Cleveland Magazine profile of Stanley saying 2011, both linked in the footnotes). The 2017 date appears wrong, based on an August 2012 source that discusses "Stanley’s wife, Denise Skinner, who died last September." https://www.mytownneo.com/article/20120805/ENTERTAINMENT/308059697) and to her best friend, Ilsa Glanzberg, an elementary school instructional aide, from 2017 until he died in 2021. He had twin daughters, Anna and Sarah, born in 1974, and five grandchildren.

== Health and death ==
Stanley had a first heart attack in 1991, at age 43. In 2017, he was diagnosed with prostate cancer. Later that year, he suffered a second heart attack and underwent quadruple bypass surgery.

Stanley died in his sleep on March 5, 2021, after suffering for seven months with lung cancer.

He is buried in Lake View Cemetery in Cleveland, OH.

== Awards and honors ==
- 1987–1991 – either one, or "a couple," or eleven, local Emmy awards
- 2012 – Cleveland Association of Broadcasters Excellence in Radio Award
- 2019 – Cleveland Arts Prize’s Lifetime Achievement Award
- 2019 – The City of Cleveland renamed a section of Huron Avenue in downtown Cleveland as Michael Stanley Way.
- 2021 – March 25, which would have been his 73rd birthday, declared Michael Stanley Day by the Cleveland City Council

== Discography ==
=== Albums ===
==== Silk ====
| Year | Title | Label | Billboard 200 |
|---|---|---|---|
| 1969 | Smooth As Raw Silk | ABC S-694 | 191 |

==== Solo ====
| Year | Title | Label | Billboard 200 |
|---|---|---|---|
| 1973 | Michael Stanley | Tumbleweed TWS 106 | 206 |
| 1973 | Friends and Legends | MCA 372 | 207 |

==== Michael Stanley Band ====
| Year | Title | Label | Billboard 200 | RPM 100 |
|---|---|---|---|---|
| 1975 | You Break It...You Bought It! | Epic PE 33492 | 184 | — |
| 1976 | Ladies' Choice | Epic PE 33917 | — | — |
| 1977 | Stage Pass | Epic PEG 34661 | 207 | — |
| 1978 | Cabin Fever | Arista AL 4182 | 99 | 97 |
| 1979 | Greatest Hints | Arista AL 4236 | 148 | — |
| 1980 | Heartland | EMI America SW–17040 | 86 | — |
| 1981 | North Coast | EMI America SW–17056 | 79 | — |
| 1982 | MSB | EMI America ST–17071 | 136 | — |
| 1983 | You Can't Fight Fashion | EMI America ST–17100 | 64 | — |
| 1984 | Fourth and Ten... | MSB 101 | — | — |
| 1986 | Inside Moves | MSB 201 | — | — |
| 1992 | Right Back at Ya (1971–1983) | Razor & Tie RE 1991 | — | — |
| 1997 | Misery Loves Company: More of the Best 1975–1983 | Razor & Tie RE 2125 | — | — |
| 2015 | Live at the Ritz NYC 1983 | Line Level | — | — |

==== The Ghost Poets ====
| Year | Title | Label | Billboard 200 |
|---|---|---|---|
| 1993 | The Ghost Poets | Razor & Tie RT 2812 | — |

==== Post-MSB solo ====
| Year | Title | Label | Billboard 200 |
|---|---|---|---|
| 1996 | Coming Up for Air | Intersound 9174 | — |
| 1998 | Live in Tangiers: The Acoustic Shows | Razor & Tie 82836 | — |
| 2000 | MS-LIVE 2K | MK 2000-2 | — |
| 2000 | Eighteen Down | Razor & Tie 82851 | — |
| 2003 | The Ground | Line Level 201 | — |
| 2005 | American Road | Line Level 202 | — |
| 2006 | The Farrago Sessions | Line Level 203 | — |
| 2007 | The Soft Addictions | Line Level 204 | — |
| 2008 | Just Another Night | Line Level 205 | — |
| 2009 | Shadowland | Line Level 206 | — |
| 2012 | The Hang | Line Level 207 | — |
| 2013 | The Ride | Line Level 208 | — |
| 2014 | The Job | Line Level 209 | — |
| 2014 | The Solo Years 1995–2014 | Line Level 222 | — |
| 2015 | And Then... | Line Level 210 | — |
| 2016 | In a Very Short Time | Line Level 211 | — |
| 2017 | Stolen Time | Line Level 212 | — |
| 2018 | The Compact Michael Stanley | Line Level | — |
| 2021 | Tough Room | Line Level 213 | — |

=== Singles ===
| Year | A-Side | B-Side | Label | US Pop | CAN Pop | Album |
|---|---|---|---|---|---|---|
| 1973 | "Rock and Roll Man" | "Denver Rain" | Tumbleweed 1010 | — | — | Michael Stanley |
| 1973 | "Rosewood Bitters" | "Good Time Charlie" | Tumbleweed 1014 | — | — | Michael Stanley |
| 1974 | "Yours For a Song" | "Roll On" | MCA 40177 | — | — | Friends and Legends |
| 1975 | "I'm Gonna Love You" | "Step the Way" | Epic 50116 | — | — | You Break It...You Bought It! |
| 1975 | "Face the Music" | "Song for My Children" | Epic 50151 | — | — | You Break It...You Bought It! |
| 1976 | "Ladies' Choice" | "Sweet Refrain" | Epic 50242 | — | — | Ladies' Choice |
| 1977 | "Nothing's Gonna Change My Mind" | "Love Hasn't Been Here" | Epic 50416 | — | — | Stagepass |
| 1978 | "Why Should Love Be This Way" | "Late Show" | Arista 0348 | — | — | Cabin Fever |
| 1978 | "Baby If You Wanna Dance" | "Fool's Parade" | Arista 0368 | — | — | Cabin Fever |
| 1979 | "Last Night" | "Down to the Wire" | Arista 0436 | — | — | Greatest Hints |
| 1980 | "He Can't Love You" | "Carolyn" | EMI America 8063 | 33 | 10 | Heartland |
| 1981 | "Lover" | "Save a Little Piece for Me" | EMI America 8064 | 68 | — | Heartland |
| 1981 | "Falling in Love Again" | "Does It Hurt" | EMI America 8090 | 64 | — | North Coast |
| 1981 | "When Your Heart Says It's Right" | "Victim of Circumstance" | EMI America 8097 | — | — | North Coast |
| 1982 | "When I'm Holding You Tight" | "In Between the Lines" | EMI America 8130 | 78 | — | MSB |
| 1982 | "Take the Time" | "Just a Little Bit Longer" | EMI America 8146 | 81 | — | MSB |
| 1983 | "My Town" | "Just How Good" | EMI America 8178 | 39 | — | You Can't Fight Fashion |
| 1983 | "Someone Like You" | "Highlife" | EMI America 8189 | 75 | — | You Can't Fight Fashion |
| 1985 | "Show Me Something" | "Somebody Else's Woman" | MSB 701 | — | — | Inside Moves |
| 1986 | "When All Is Said and Done" | "Here Come the Kids" | MSB 801 | — | — | Inside Moves |
| 1986 | "Poor Side of Town" | "Headlights" | MSB 901 | — | — | Inside Moves |
