= Heartland (Michael Stanley Band album) =

Studio album by Michael Stanley Band
- Released: September 8, 1980
- Recorded: April–May 1980
- Genre: Rock
- Length: 39:43
- Label: EMI America
- Producer: Michael Stanley Band

Michael Stanley Band chronology
Greatest Hints (1979)	Heartland (1980)	North Coast (1981)

Heartland is an album by the Michael Stanley Band released in 1980. It reached No. 86 on the Billboard 200 album chart in 1981. The album stayed in the top 100 for over eight weeks and was in the top 200 for an additional ten weeks.

== Recording and release ==
Arguably the biggest album of the Cleveland, Ohio–based rock group, Heartland was released in 1980, after the band was dropped from Arista Records following their mediocre-charting Greatest Hints album. The band was not convinced that they could come back from a fall down the charts, as Greatest Hints only reached number No. 148 on the Billboard magazine album chart. The band continued on without a label and recorded the album that would become their US breakthrough, Heartland. The band planned to release the masterwork independently, however, EMI America Records picked up both the band and the Heartland album upon its completion. The album peaked at No. 86 in Billboard in 1981.

== Chart successes and fallout ==
Heartland proved to be the album the band had been waiting since the 1970s to see. However, speculation regarding lack of touring, limited radio play, weak support from EMI America, and the band being exhausted from trying year after year to crack the top of the charts have been blamed for the apparent fall that occurred after the Heartland bonanza the band enjoyed.

== Singles ==
The album spawned the band's highest-charting single, "He Can't Love You", which reached No. 33 on the Billboard Hot 100 chart in 1981. The song features a sax lick by Clarence Clemons that makes it instantly recognizable. The album featured another single, "Lover", rising to a respectable No. 68 on the charts and staying there for over two weeks. It featured the iconic lyric "thank God for the man who put the white lines on the highway", which was sung back by the audiences to Stanley whenever he performed the song live.

=== Weekly charts ===
Chart (1981)	Song	Peak position	Reference
U.S. Billboard Hot 100	"He Can't Love You"	33	
U.S. Billboard Hot 100	"Lover"	68	
Canada RPM Top 100	"He Can't Love You"	10	

"He Can't Love You" was No. 92 in the Canadian Top 100 Singles of 1981.

== Aftermath ==
Although MSB went on to more chart successes after Heartland, which the band considered to be its definitive album, MSB never again fully felt the instantaneous relief following the release of Heartland. The band's next album, North Coast, released in 1981 would go on to top the chart position of Heartland surging up to the No. 79 spot. After the first two successful EMI America albums, the third, MSB, released in 1982, stalled at No. 136 on the Billboard album chart, failing to crack the top 100.

== Track listing ==
All tracks written by Michael Stanley, except where noted.

No.	Title	Writer(s)	Length
1.	"I'll Never Need Anyone More (Than I Need You Tonight)"		3:16
2.	"Lover"		4:52
3.	"Don't Stop the Music"		3:38
4.	"He Can't Love You"	Kevin Raleigh	3:37
5.	"Working Again"		3:56
6.	"All I Ever Wanted"		3:11
7.	"Say Goodbye"	Raleigh	3:27
8.	"Hearts on Fire"		2:49
9.	"Voodoo"		4:32
10.	"Carolyn"	Stanley, Bob Pelander	3:02
11.	"Save a Little Piece for Me"	Gary Markasky, Raleigh	3:19
Total length:			39:43

== Personnel ==
Michael Stanley Band

- Michael Stanley – lead and backing vocals, electric and acoustic guitars, percussion
- Kevin Raleigh – lead and backing vocals, organ, piano, percussion
- Michael Gismondi – bass, synthesizer
- Gary Markasky – lead electric guitars
- Bob Pelander – piano, organ, electric piano, synthesizer, orchestra bells, percussion, vocals
- Tommy Dobeck – drums, percussion
- Danny Powers – lead guitar and vocals on live bonus tracks

Additional performers

- Clarence Clemons – saxophone
- Dan Montecalvo – choke

Production

- Produced by the Michael Stanley Band
- Engineered by Arnie Rosenberg and Paul Schwartz, assisted by Lydia Terrion
- Mixed by Fred Mollin, Michael Verdick, and the Michael Stanley Band
- Mastered by Mike Reese
- Art direction by Bob Rath; Reissue art direction by Kristian Lawing
- Photography by Anastasia Pantsios and Dan Montecalvo
