= Kevin Raleigh =

American singer and keyboardist (born 1952)

- Born: February 27, 1952 (age 74); Cleveland, Ohio, United States
- Origin: United States
- Genres: Rock, pop
- Instruments: Vocals, keyboards
- Years active: 1969–1990
- Labels: Mainstream, Arista, EMI, MSB, Atlantic, Razor & Tie

Kevin Raleigh is an American singer and keyboardist best known for his tenure with the Michael Stanley Band.

== History ==
Born in Cleveland, Ohio, on February 27, 1952, Raleigh came to local prominence in 1969 with the band Paper Sun, later known as Freeport Express and Freeport. As Freeport, the band cut an album in Miami for Mainstream Records.

In 1973, Raleigh was recruited by former Raspberries members Jim Bonfanti and Dave Smalley to join them in the band Dynamite, who cut an album of Smalley-Raleigh originals which was never released.

Raleigh would also be a member of Bonfanti's subsequent band, Pictures, formed in 1977. That same year he was in a band with Paper Sun/Freeport bandmate Roger Lewis and guitarist Neil Giraldo.

Raleigh first performed with the Michael Stanley Band when they toured behind their 1978 album Cabin Fever. His first recording with the band was Greatest Hints in 1978, on which he emerged—in tandem with Stanley—as one of the band's singers and songwriters.

Remaining with MSB until its 1987 dissolution, Raleigh was responsible for several of MSB's most high-profile cuts, including "Someone Like You", "When I'm Holding You Tight" and the band's most successful single, "He Can't Love You" (featuring Raleigh on lead vocals), which peaked on the Hot 100 at #33 in January 1981.

Raleigh went on to record a solo album, Delusions of Grandeur, released on Atlantic Records in the spring of 1989. The album included two tracks, "I Should've Known Better" and "The Art of War", produced by Neil Giraldo, who had gone on to become Pat Benatar's guitarist, songwriter and husband. The track "Moonlight on Water"—one of only two of the album's ten tracks not written by Raleigh—was produced by Peter Coleman, who had also worked extensively with Benatar.

Issued as a single, "Moonlight on Water" reached #60 on the Billboard Hot 100, but otherwise Raleigh's bid for a solo career was largely overlooked. (A 1990 version by Laura Branigan had a single release whose chart performance echoed that of Raleigh's original; Branigan took the song to #59.)

Raleigh subsequently moved into the field of artist management and in 2008 he was listed as an owner of the L.A.-based Associated Talent Management (ATM).

== Discography ==
=== Studio albums ===
- Delusions of Grandeur (1989)

=== with Freeport ===
- Freeport (1970)

=== with Michael Stanley Band ===
- Greatest Hints (1979)
- Heartland (1980)
- North Coast (1981)
- MSB (1982)
- You Can't Fight Fashion (1983)
- Inside Moves (1986)

=== Singles ===
- "Anyone With a Heart" (1989)
- "Moonlight on Water" (1989)
