= Bandaloo Doctors =

Bandaloo Doctors was a Los Angeles supergroup, playing their own "revolutionary hard-rockin' blues" - From 1988 until 1996 they became darlings of the media and a number of Hollywood celebrities.

They toured until 1994, on their own, or paired with acts like Edgar Winter, The Fabulous T-Birds or John Mayall. The group even supported Ringo Starr & His All-Starrs for one tour. This hard rock / blues based foursome consisted of former Aerosmith guitar hero Jimmy Crespo; CSN&Y drummer Dallas Taylor; bassist/songwriter Danny Sheridan and his then wife, vocalist Bonnie Bramlett.

The group's first recordings were composed and produced in 1986 with Sheridan's longtime friend Jonah Koslen, and released as the soundtrack for an episode of MGM's TV series F.A.M.E. which guest starred Bramlett. Soon The Knack's drummer Bruce Gary suggested that they add Crespo to their line up. After Koslen left the group, they tried a series of notable drummers until Taylor ultimately fit best.

In spite of the critic's raves and great national press and television exposure, the group split apart due to drug problems and the eventual marital breakup of founders Sheridan and Bramlett. Several CDs worth of material still await a number of legal battles before they can be released.
