= North Coast (album) =

Studio album by Michael Stanley Band
- Released: July 13, 1981
- Recorded: April – May 1981
- Studio: Suma (Painesville, Ohio)
- Genre: Rock
- Length: 49:20
- Label: EMI America
- Producer: Michael Stanley Band, Eddie Kramer

Michael Stanley Band chronology
Heartland (1980)	North Coast (1981)	MSB (1982)

North Coast is an album by the Cleveland based Michael Stanley Band which was released in 1981. It reached No. 79 on the Billboard charts and included the hit Falling in Love Again which reached No. 64 on the Billboard hot singles list. It was the second album for the group on EMI America. The album's title refers to Cleveland, Ohio's "North Coast", which is the city's lakefront district. Stanley also used the term to portray Cleveland as its own "coast," separate from the East Coast and West Coast of the U.S.

== Album origin ==
Following the success of Heartland, the band gathered at the Suma Recording studios in Cleveland, Ohio to record another collection of "solid rock" tunes, as Stanley put it. The album was produced by Eddie Kramer, who worked with the Beatles, the Rolling Stones, Led Zeppelin, Kiss, and the Jimi Hendrix Experience, and was mixed at the Electric Lady Studios in Greenwich Village, New York City. Reviewers and Stanley himself claimed the album best approximated how the band sounds when it is performing in concert.

== The songs ==
The album opens with In the Heartland, Stanley's ode to the life of a typical midwestern American. This was also a nod to the band's previous album, Heartland. This was followed by keyboardist Kevin Raleigh's When Your Heart Says It's Right, Stanley/Pelander's Somewhere in the Night, and Stanley's Heaven and Hell, all of which became standards at the band's performances for sold out crowds in the midwest states. One of the most ambitious tracks on the record was the New Wave-sounding Chemistry. The sole hit was "Falling in Love Again" written by Michael Stanley and keyboardist Bob Pelander. It reached No. 64 on the Billboard charts. The B-side was "Does It Hurt". The album concludes with another blue-collar rock anthem, "Let's Hear It."

=== Weekly charts ===
Chart (1981)	Song	Peak position	Reference
U.S. Billboard Hot 100	"Falling in Love Again"	64	

== Track listing ==
No.	Title	Writer(s)	Length
1.	"In the Heartland"	Michael Stanley	3:32
2.	"When Your Heart Says It's Right"	Kevin Raleigh	3:30
3.	"Somewhere in the Night"	Stanley, Bob Pelander	3:21
4.	"You're My Love"	Raleigh	2:44
5.	"Heaven and Hell"	Stanley	3:32
6.	"Don't You Do That to Me"	Raleigh	3:34
7.	"Falling in Love Again"	Stanley, Pelander	3:56
8.	"Tell Me"	Stanley, Pelander	3:29
9.	"Chemistry"	Stanley	2:53
10.	"Victim of Circumstance"	Stanley, Pelander	2:55
11.	"We Can Make It"	Raleigh	3:08
12.	"Let's Hear It"	Stanley	3:47
Total length:			49:20

== Personnel ==
- Michael Stanley – guitar, vocals
- Gary Markasky – lead guitar
- Kevin Raleigh – keyboards, vocals
- Michael Gismondi – bass guitar
- Tommy Dobeck – drums
- Bob Pelander – keyboards, vocals
- Rick Bell – saxophone
