= MSB (album) =

Studio album by Michael Stanley Band
- Released: August 23, 1982
- Recorded: March – June 1982
- Genre: Rock
- Label: EMI America
- Producer: Michael Stanley Band, Don Gehman

Michael Stanley Band chronology
North Coast (1981)	MSB (1982)	You Can't Fight Fashion (1983)

MSB is an album by the Cleveland, Ohio-based Michael Stanley Band that was released in August 1982 on the EMI America label. It was the band's third release on the EMI America label. The record reached #136 on the Billboard Magazine Album Charts in 1982 and was lead guitarist Gary Markasky's last outing with the group.

== Meaning behind album name ==
The Michael Stanley Band is commonly referred to as "MSB" by their fan base. The album, MSB, was titled in homage to this tradition. However, the record failed to ignite further fire as many record buyers did not know what MSB stood for. This hampered an otherwise well-produced and potential single hits-filled album.

== The third EMI America/MSB offering ==
Following the albums Heartland and North Coast in 1980 and 1981 respectively, the Michael Stanley Band came out with this effort in 1982. By this point in their career, the Michael Stanley Band had become known as a rock outfit always capable of writing "good solid rock," and this album is hardly an exception to that rule.

The recordings were laid down at the Recording Connection in Cleveland, Ohio and the Bee Gees' Middle Ear Studio in Miami, Florida.

== The Michael Stanley/Kevin Raleigh collaboration continues ==
By this time, Michael Stanley and Kevin Raleigh were writing fan favorites without much of an issue over getting Cleveland (and mid-western markets in general) coveted radio station airplay. EMI America seemed to be exactly what the band needed to put a fire in its belly and crank out hit after hit. The powerful "doo wop-ish" styled "Night by Night" is an instant recognizable Stanley (with help from Becker and Fagen) harmony-layered composition. The disc also gave fans another ballad titled "Spanish Nights." Written once again by frontman Stanley, the tune is an ebbing and flowing tale of love and life in accordance with Stanley's unique real-life references. In line with the previous and future MSB platters, the Raleigh-penned song "One of Those Dreams" is bolstered by a blistering sax line by Bell. The LP lead vocals/main writing credits are equally divided (five and five) between group dominants Stanley and Raleigh.

== Continued singles success ==
Following in the tradition set forth by the two previous LPs, this record highlights two more of the band's top selling singles of all time. Raleigh's "When I'm Holding You Tight," which was coupled with Stanley's guttural self-letter-styled song "In Between the Lines," was the first of the two. The single hit the Billboard Hot 100 in 1982, charting at more-than-acceptable #78. Incidentally, "In Between the Lines" is to this day a live favorite with audiences. The track features a beautiful piano lick by Bob Pelander and iconic Stanley growl style vocals, shouting out "some six-string, front-page temporary loss of sanity.....but you ain't reading, baby, in between the lines." The song is a farewell open letter to John Lennon (who died in 1980). Michael Stanley said he wrote it almost as a nod to himself for finally achieving his dream of becoming a famous singer/songwriter, thereby following the steps of his much more successful hero John Lennon of the Beatles.

The second single features the second Stanley-scored offering, called "Take the Time," which hit the charts and peaked at #81 in mid-1983. The song was well-received and a companion MTV video was produced to bolster the sales of the song. The song was a cautionary tale about not rushing into judgement over decisions of love and life in general. The A side was backed with, as was the custom on this album, a strong Kevin Raleigh tune called "Just a Little Bit Longer."

== Track listing ==
No.	Title	Writer(s)	Length
1.	"In Between the Lines"	Michael Stanley	5:16
2.	"If You Love Me"	Kevin Raleigh	3:50
3.	"Night by Night"	Stanley	4:38
4.	"When I'm Holding You Tight"	Raleigh	4:10
5.	"Spanish Nights"	Stanley	5:42
6.	"One of Those Dreams"	Raleigh	3:58
7.	"Love Hurts"	Raleigh	3:38
8.	"Hang Tough"	Stanley	4:02
9.	"Just a Little Bit Longer"	Raleigh	3:50
10.	"Take the Time"	Stanley	5:34
Total length:			49:38

== Personnel ==
- Michael Stanley – guitar, percussion, vocals
- Gary Markasky – lead guitar, acoustic guitar
- Kevin Raleigh – piano, electric piano, organ, synthesizer, percussion, vocals
- Michael Gismondi – bass guitar, saxophone
- Tommy Dobeck – drums
- Bob Pelander – piano, electric piano, organ, synthesizer, acoustic guitar, percussion, backing vocals
- Rick Bell – saxophone

Production

- Produced and arranged by Don Gehman and the Michael Stanley Band
- Engineered by Don Gehman, assisted by "Massive" Jim Carroccio, Dale Peterson, and Samii Taylor Porter
- Mixed by Don Gehman
- Mastered by George Marino
- Art direction by Bill Burks
- Design by Jonathan Louie
- Photography by Dan Montecalvo

=== Weekly charts ===
Chart (1981)	Song	Peak position	Reference
U.S. Billboard Hot 100	"When I'm Holding You Tight"	78	
U.S. Billboard Hot 100	"Take The Time"	81	
