= Danny Sheridan =

American songwriter

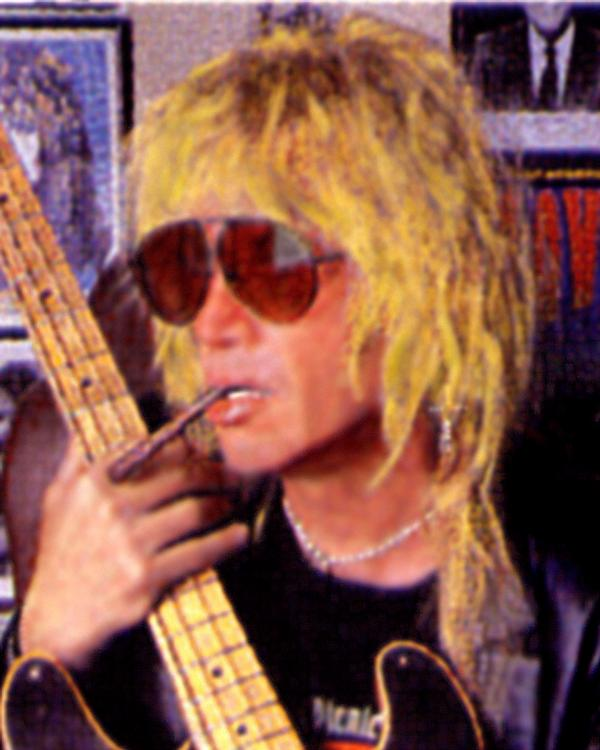
- Danny Sheridan with his 1951 Fender Precision Bass in a photograph that appeared in Bass Player Magazine, October 2001. (Photo by Carol Sheridan. Used with permission)

Background information
- Born: October 11, 1950
- Died: May 24, 2016 (aged 65)
- Genres: Outlaw country, rock, blues
- Occupation(s): Songwriter, bassist, record producer, actor, manager
- Instrument(s): Bass, guitar, piano, drums, backing vocals

Danny Sheridan (October 11, 1950 – May 24, 2016) was an American musician, songwriter, producer, actor, and entertainment manager. In 2006 he also became a radio personality on 97.1 KLSX Free FM (CBS Los Angeles). He is credited as an influential electric bass player, and as the founder of the Eli Radish Band, pioneers of the so-called outlaw country music genre. This is a style that Sheridan's former band-mate/vocalist David Allan Coe continues to perform today, with a string of hit songs like "Would You Lay with Me (In a Field of Stone)" and the anti-boss tune, "Take This Job And Shove It". Still in his teens, Sheridan's Eli Radish toured with such notable acts as The Who and The Doors. The lyrics of Coe's "Longhaired Redneck" forever memorialized the concerts he performed with Sheridan while fronting the Eli Radish Band. In 2014 Sheridan began managing Coe and co-produced his new CD "Just As I Am", with Boris Menart.

Sheridan also helped launch and manage his then-girlfriend Playboy model Nina Blackwood’s TV career as MTV’s first video jockey (VJ), and in October 1983 US Magazine praised his "astute management" for "orchestrating her meteoric rise". Sheridan continued to represent Blackwood and keep her active in music culture for the majority of her career.

In 1988, Sheridan married blues vocalist Bonnie Bramlett of Delaney, Bonnie & Friends and On Tour with Eric Clapton fame, soon managing her 1990s career comeback where he wrote and produced the "Revolutionary Hard Rockin’ Blues" of their group, Bandaloo Doctors. The Doctors' music attracted the admiration of many Hollywood celebrities including Tom and Roseanne Arnold, and the musical couple was soon cast for several seasons of the hit ABC series Roseanne: Bramlett as the recurring character "Bonnie Watkins, the Waitress", with Sheridan writing music and appearing on-camera as "Hank the Bass Player" in "The Bowling Alley" episode, during which Bramlett, Sheridan and David Crosby perform Sheridan's song, "Roll On Down." People Magazine and Robin Leach's Lifestyles of the Rich and Famous (who followed the Bandaloo Doctors during their tenure with the 1992 Ringo Starr Tour) praised Sheridan for "reinventing Bramlett’s career". Sheridan later went on to act with Pauly Shore.

In 2009, Sheridan began collaborating with his fiancé, Angelle Sheridan. The two collected a catalog of songs that the couple had planned to publish and record together. Danny and Angelle had planned to marry in a ceremony held at the Rock and Roll Hall of Fame on Halloween 2017. Angelle began using Sheridan's last name professionally when the couple became engaged in 2010.

Sheridan's songs have been performed by many artists, including Bramlett, Coe, Amy Madigan, Nia Peeples, Angelle Sheridan and David Crosby. Sheridan has also composed for TV and film, most notably CHiPs, Fame, and the feature film Gang Related.

A musician-spokesman for the non-profit House Ear Institute, Sheridan's charity work has included: Farm Aid, Jerry Lewis’s Muscular Dystrophy Association Telethons and the MDA's Harley Davidson "Love Rides", the March of Dimes Telethons, the VH-1 Homeless video, the annual Musicians' Picnic, Recovery Net Radio, and the co-production of Easy Rider Magazine's 1997 "Run For The Wild" concert to benefit the animal rescue Wildlife WayStation.

Through the years, Sheridan has been a speaker for Broadcast Music Incorporated (BMI), the Durango Songwriters Expo and, in 2009, hosted the first annual Songwriters Experience workshops and seminars with Angelle in Palm Springs, California. He has also lectured about songwriting and publishing at UCLA. Sheridan co-authored "Carl’s Jr." founder Carl Karcher's biography, and was an original advisory board member to top bass amplifier manufacturer SWR Sound Corporation

== Illness and death ==
In 2011, Sheridan's mental and physical health began a serious decline that would eventually take his life in 2016. That May he was hospitalized with cirrhosis, and the initial symptoms of alcoholic dementia. His eyes and skin had become dark yellow, as he refused to seek medical treatment when the symptoms first appeared.

== Rock and Roll Hall of Fame ==
In 2002, Danny Sheridan and the Eli Radish Band were featured in Deanna Adams' book, Rock and Roll and the Cleveland Connection, recounting the band's early years forming in the Northeast Ohio area. In 2004 the Rock and Roll Hall Of Fame Museum added some of Sheridan's memorabilia to their permanent collection. Pictured here: one of his bass guitar cases, a rhinestone shirt and a "Ringo & His All Starrs" artist pass.

Recently Sheridan had co-produced 'House' re-mixes for Rock Star: Supernova's Dilana with Barcelona DJ Franco Munoz and continued to compose for and produce other musicians and radio shows, including Nina Blackwood's syndicated "Absolutely 80s", "New Wave Nation" and her "80s On 8" shows on Sirius XM Radio.
