= Micah Nelson =

American singer, songwriter, producer and artist

- Also known as: Particle Kid
- Born: Jacob Micah Nelson; Austin, Texas, US
- Genres: Psychedelia; folk-rock; experimental
- Occupations: Musician; singer; songwriter; producer; artist; painter; activist
- Instruments: Vocals; guitar; bass; drums; percussion; keyboards; harmonica; surdo; charango; cello; whistling
- Years active: 2008–present
- Member of: Neil Young and the Chrome Hearts
- Formerly of: Insects vs Robots; Promise of the Real
- Website: www.particlekid.com

Jacob Micah Nelson is an American singer, songwriter, multi-instrumentalist, producer, and multimedia artist. He performs and records under the name Particle Kid and has released four albums under that moniker; he was also a longtime member of the band Insects vs Robots. The youngest son of Willie Nelson and his wife Annie D'Angelo, and the brother of Lukas Nelson, Micah Nelson also works with his father as co-writer and producer and has appeared on Willie Nelson albums. He has served as the guitarist with Neil Young and Crazy Horse and is a founder with Young of the Chrome Hearts.

== Early life and education ==
Jacob Micah Nelson was born in Austin, Texas. He grew up on his father's tour bus, along with living in homes in both Austin and Maui, Hawaii.

Nelson has led a musical life since early childhood. He has recalled playing harmonica in Willie Nelson's band at the age of three. His father taught him guitar. Both Micah and Lukas are whistlers themselves, using it in their songs along with a song with Neil Young, another whistler. He considers his father a major influence, and has also cited Beck as an early musical inspiration.

Willie Nelson gave Micah the nickname "Particle Kid" when Micah was 14. Micah believes Willie misspoke while trying to say "prodigal son." The nickname stuck and Micah went on to use it as a stage and band name in future years.

== Career ==
=== Insects vs Robots ===
From 2008 to 2017, Nelson was a member of the band Insects vs Robots, which released three albums and an EP. From 2009 to 2010, he lived with the band at The Cozy Castle, a blue warehouse building converted to a venue and recording studio in Los Angeles, recording and performing as part of an underground creative community based there. The title of the band's 2011 album Tales from the Blue House reflected the color of the Cozy Castle building.

=== Music: 2010s ===
During the later 2010s, Nelson toured extensively as Particle Kid with former Insects vs Robots bandmates Tony Peluso and Jeff Smith. He also toured with Neil Young, the Flaming Lips, the Claypool Lennon Delirium, and Promise of the Real with his brother Lukas Nelson.

In 2012, Nelson released on the Teaching Machine label the Particle Kid EP Shapes, recorded in a solar-powered yellow recording-studio van he named "Vincent Van Gogh".

On September 27, 2014, Nelson performed with Neil Young and Promise of the Real at the Harvest the Hope concert in Nebraska opposing the proposed Keystone XL pipeline.

Since 2016, Nelson has maintained a close relationship with Hen House Studios (also a record label) in Venice, California and its owner Harlan Steinberger. He has recorded various Particle Kid projects there over the years including Window Rock, Time Capsule, his self-titled album, and Particle War, his collaborative album with Sunny War, and made Particle Kid and Insects vs Robots videos there.

In November 2018, Org Music released Lucky Wheel, a split 12-inch 45 rpm EP by Nelson (as Particle Kid) and X guitarist John Doe. Credited to "Kid Doe", the release features the two musicians covering one of each other's songs, with Doe performing Nelson's "Wheels" and Nelson performing Doe's "Lucky Penny". The EP also includes Doe's cover of "Hello Stranger" (the Carter Family) and Nelson's cover of "Captain Kidd" (Michael Hurley). Lucky Wheel was issued as a Record Store Day exclusive for Small Business Saturday. "Wheels" was later recorded by Willie Nelson on Last Leaf on the Tree (2024), which Micah Nelson also produced.

In 2019, Nelson released the Particle Kid album Window Rock. Premier Guitar named it one of the best albums of the year.

=== Music: 2020s ===
In 2020, during the COVID-19 pandemic, Nelson released the Particle Kid album Live! Underground and worked on an animation project with Neil Young called Trans: The Animated Story.

Nelson performed on the studio recording of the Flaming Lips single "Will You Return/When You Come Down" from their 2020 album American Head and performed it live with them on Jimmy Kimmel's show the following year. Later in the year, he opened for and sat in with the band on their fall tour.

In 2021, Nelson and Sean Lennon released the single "Velocirapture (The Serpent Flew)".

On April 22, 2022, Nelson released his fourth album as Particle Kid, the double-LP Time Capsule. Critics described it as "avant-folk" and "trippy Americana...a decade-spanning image of American spacetime troubadour music." It includes collaborations with J Mascis, Sean Lennon, Willie Nelson, Jim James of My Morning Jacket and others. That spring, Particle Kid toured as the opening act for the Flaming Lips.

=== 2020s: Collaborations (Neil Young, Willie Nelson, Arcade Fire etc.) ===
In June 2022, Nelson and his father released a collaborative single, "Die When I'm High (Halfway to Heaven)", a tribute to the elder Nelson. The two toured together with the Outlaw Music Festival that year.

In spring 2023, Nelson collaborated with Margo Price on a cover of Willie Nelson's "Hands on the Wheel" as part of Willie Nelson's 90th-birthday celebrations.

In 2024, he joined Neil Young and Crazy Horse for their Love Earth summer tour, replacing Nils Lofgren on guitar. In 2024, he also formed a new band with Neil Young called the Chrome Hearts. Nelson contributed animation to the 2024 Neil Young film Coastal.

Also in 2024, he produced Willie Nelson's album Last Leaf on the Tree and was featured on the Arcade Fire track "Year of the Snake". In 2025, he performed with Arcade Fire at the Luck Reunion Festival.

=== Multimedia ===
In 2011, Nelson and artist/VJ David Wexler (aka Strangeloop) formed the "avant-cinephile" audiovisual collective Teaching Machine and proceeded to collaborate on experimental projects including the animated short film "Anamnesia."

In the early 2010s, Nelson experimented with the "cymatics" technique of performing live music through water held in a speaker cone, and visually projecting the emerging surface patterns.

Nelson's visual artwork is featured and sold at the Moonlight Arts Collective.

Through his Spitball Pictures production studio, Nelson produces and in some cases directs music videos and films for artists such as Edie Brickell & New Bohemians, Neil Young, Sunny War, Folk Uke, Anthony LoGerfo of Promise of the Real, and Tinariwen as well as Nelson's own musical projects. He does animation work such as creating the character animation for the 2016 "Blast" video from Clams Casino.

== Activism ==
Nelson has served on the board of directors of the National Hemp Association. He participates in Farm Aid events and music festivals. He championed a Change.org petition that helped enact the Industrial Hemp Farming Act of 2018.

== Personal life ==
Nelson married Alexandra Dascalu (now Alexandra Dascalu-Nelson) in 2019.

== Discography ==
=== Albums and EPs ===
| Title | Artist | Year | Label | Producer |
|---|---|---|---|---|
| Geryl & the Great Homunculus | Insects vs Robots | 2010 | | |
| GWALCHMAi (live in Austin...) (EP) | Particle Kid | 2011 | | |
| Aftertaste (EP) | Particle Kid | 2012 | | |
| Attics (EP) | Particle Kid | 2012 | | |
| Shapes (EP) | Particle Kid | 2012 | Teaching Machine | Micah Nelson |
| Tales from the Blue House | Insects vs Robots | 2013 | Dome of Doom Records | |
| Insects vs Robots | Insects vs Robots | 2013 | Dome of Doom Records | |
| Toe Tappers (Songs for a Mediocre Depression (EP) | Particle Kid | 2013 | | |
| Hollows (EP) | Particle Kid | 2014 | | |
| Soundtrack to a Non-existent Film (EP) | Particle Kid | 2014 | | |
| Demo-itis | Particle Kid | 2014 | | |
| Stupid Dreams (EP) | Insects vs Robots | 2016 | | |
| Theyllkillyaa | Insects vs Robots | 2016 | Hen House Studios | |
| Particle Kid | Particle Kid | 2017 | | |
| Everything Is Bullshit | Particle Kid | 2017 | Gnarburger Records | |
| Particle War | Sunny War & Particle Kid | 2018 | Org Music | |
| Lucky Wheel | Particle Kid & John Doe (as "Kid Doe") | 2018 | | |
| Window Rock | Particle Kid | 2019 | Overseas Artists Recordings (OAR)/Hen House | Micah Nelson |
| Live! Underground | Particle Kid | 2020 | | |
| Time Capsule | Particle Kid | 2022 | Overseas Artists Recordings (OAR)/Hen House | Micah Nelson |
| Super Bloom: A Benefit for Los Angeles Fire Relief | Various Artists | 2025 | | |

=== Singles as artist ===
| Title | Artist | Year | Label | Producer |
|---|---|---|---|---|
| "Die When I'm High (Halfway to Heaven)" | Micah Nelson and Willie Nelson | 2022 | | |
| "Someone Else's Dream" | Particle Kid, J Mascis, Sunny War | 2022 | | |

=== Singles/tracks as featured artist ===
| Title | Artist | Year | Label | Producer |
|---|---|---|---|---|
| "Year of the Snake" | Arcade Fire | 2024 | | |
| "Hands on the Wheel" | Margo Price | 2022 | | |
