= The Goldens =

American country music duo

- Origin: Brewton, Alabama, United States
- Genres: Country
- Years active: 1987–1996, 2022-2024
- Labels: Epic, Capitol/SBK
- Past members: Rusty Golden; Chris Golden

The Goldens were an American country music duo from Brewton, Alabama composed of Rusty and Chris Golden, sons of The Oak Ridge Boys member William Lee Golden. Before forming The Goldens, Chris was a member of Cedar Creek and Rusty was a member of The Boys Band. Supporting musicians in The Goldens included Greg Gordon, Don Breland, John Rich, Skip Mitchell, Buster Phillips, Bobby Randall, and John Sturdivant, Jr.

The Goldens' self-titled debut album was released by Epic Records in 1987. Two singles from the album, Put Us Together Again and Sorry Girls charted on the Billboard Hot Country Singles & Tracks chart. The Goldens moved to Capitol/SBK Records for the release of their second album, Rush for Gold, in 1990. The album produced three charting singles and videos, 'Take Me Back To The Country', 'Keep The Faith', and 'Long Gone'. After disbanding, Rusty released three solo albums and continued to perform live and write songs. Chris was in The Oak Ridge Boys band from 1996-2014 and later played with Alabama and Restless Heart. Chris started a solo career, releasing seven albums and garnering eight number one songs as an Inspirational country act, and produced and released award winning videos in that format as well. During the pandemic, the brothers reunited, and together with their father recorded three albums as William Lee Golden & The Goldens. They toured in support of those albums each year, beginning in 2022, with an all-star band.

Rusty Golden died in 2024 at the age of 65.

== Discography ==
=== Albums ===
Title	Album details
The Goldens	Release date: 1987; Label: Epic Records
Live '89	Release date: October 1989; Label: 24k Records
Rush for Gold	Release date: September 18, 1990; Label: Capitol/SBK Records

=== Singles ===
Year	Single	Peak positions	Album
Year	Single	US Country	Album
1988	"Put Us Together Again"	55	The Goldens
1988	"Sorry Girls"	63	The Goldens
1991	"Take Me Back to the Country"	—	Rush for Gold
1991	"Keep the Faith"	67	Rush for Gold
1991	"Little Piece of Land"	—	Rush for Gold
"—" denotes releases that did not chart

=== Music videos ===
Year	Video	Director
1991	"Take Me Back to the Country"	Bob Burwell
1991	"Keep the Faith"	Bob Burwell
1991	"Little Piece of Land"	Chris Golden
