= William Lee Golden =

American singer (born 1939)

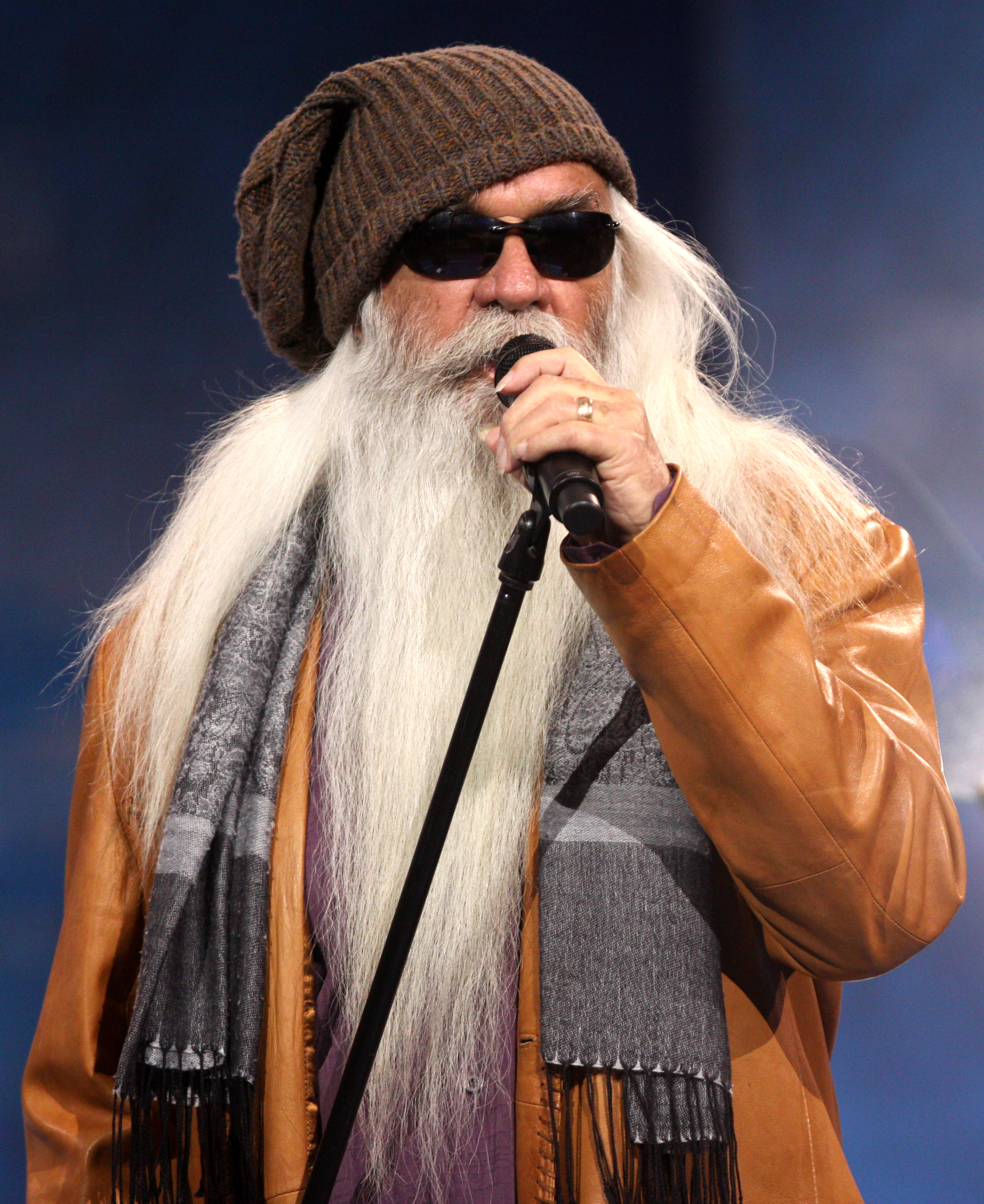
- Golden in 2013

Background information
- Born: William Lee Golden; January 12, 1939 (age 87)
- Origin: Brewton, Alabama, U.S.
- Genres: Country, gospel
- Occupations: Singer, painter
- Instrument: Vocals (baritone)
- Years active: 1965–present
- Labels: MCA, Mercury
- Member of: The Oak Ridge Boys
- Website: www.williamleegolden.com

William Lee Golden (born January 12, 1939) is an American country music singer. Between 1965 and 1987, and again since 1996, he has been the baritone singer in the country vocal group the Oak Ridge Boys. Golden was inducted into the Country Music Hall of Fame in 2015 as a member of the Oak Ridge Boys.

== Career ==
Golden joined the Oak Ridge Boys (then a Southern gospel music group) in 1965. Golden is widely known for his waist-length beard and hair. He was voted out of the Oak Ridge Boys in 1987, as the other three members wanted to change the band's image. Golden was replaced by Steve Sanders after releasing his own album as a solo artist titled American Vagabond, which included two chart singles. In 1990, he moved to Mercury Records and released "Louisiana Red Dirt Highway" as a single only. Sanders left the group in 1995, and Golden returned on New Year's Eve of the same year.

== Personal life ==
He has been married four times. Golden was married to Frogene Normand from 1957 to 1975. He married Luetta Callaway in 1984 and they divorced in 1987. He was married to Brenda Kaye Hall from 1990 to 2013. Golden married Simone De Staley in 2015. He has four sons, Rusty, Craig, Chris, and Solomon, a stepdaughter, and seven grandchildren. Golden's sons Rusty (who died in 2024) and Chris recorded as the Goldens for Epic Records and Capitol Records from 1988 to 1991. They also played in his band on his solo dates and on his albums.

== The "Golden Era Plantation" ==
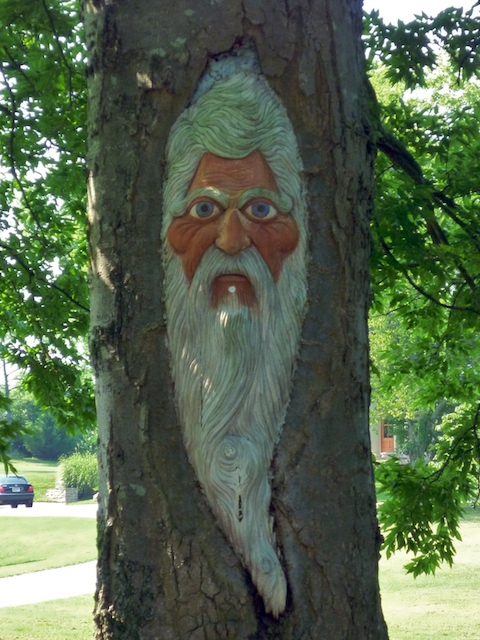
Golden's likeness carved into the side of an oak tree on the edge of his property, which is visible from the road

Golden's home is called the Golden Era Plantation. Built in 1786, it is recognized as the oldest brick home in Sumner County, Tennessee. The Federal-style structure was built in 1786, then called Pilot's Knob, on a military outpost by American Revolutionary War Captain James Franklin, the father of planter and slave trader Isaac Franklin (1789–1846). After the war, he was awarded a land grant to the property.

During the Civil War, the plantation became a station camp for Confederate soldiers. To protect their valuable gold and silver from approaching Union soldiers, the occupants buried the metals in the ground surrounding the house. This gold was later discovered during renovation of the home in 1976.

The area has been struck twice by tornadoes, once in 1892 and again on April 6, 2006. Originally a two-story building, the second story was removed by the first tornado. Repairs were made, leaving it as a single-story home. Following the second tornado, the home's architecture was restored, adding a second story. As of 2016, William Lee Golden still resided at Golden Era.

== Discography ==
=== Albums ===
Year	Album	US Country	Label
1986	American Vagabond	53	MCA
2000	My Life's Work	—	Audio Visual Arts III
2010	The Artist	—	self-released
2022	The Old Country Church	—	DAVA
2022	Country Roads	—	DAVA
2022	Southern Accents	—	DAVA

=== Singles ===
Year	Single	Chart positions		Album
Year	Single	US Country	CAN Country	Album
1986	"Love Is the Only Way Out"	53	58	American Vagabond
1986	"You Can't Take It with You"	72	52	American Vagabond
1990	"Keep Lookin' Up"	—	—	Non-album singles
1990	"Louisiana Red Dirt Highway"	—	—	Non-album singles

=== Guest singles ===
Year	Single	Artist	US Country	Album
1990	"Tomorrow's World"	Various artists	74	Single only

=== Music videos ===
Year	Single
1990	"Keep Lookin' Up"
1990	"Louisiana Red Dirt Highway"
