= You Can't Fight Fashion =

Studio album by Michael Stanley Band
- Released: 1983
- Recorded: April – June 1983
- Genre: Heartland rock
- Label: EMI America
- Producer: Michael Stanley Band, Bob Clearmountain

Michael Stanley Band chronology
MSB (1982)	You Can't Fight Fashion (1983)	Fourth and Ten... (1984)

Professional ratings
Review scores
Source	Rating
Allmusic	3/5 stars

You Can't Fight Fashion is the final major-label album by the rock band Michael Stanley Band. The album was the band's highest-charting album reaching #64 on the Billboard Magazine Top 200 in late 1983 and staying there for almost three weeks. The album features the hit singles "My Town" and "Someone Like You" as well as Stanley's song about a mining disaster called Fire in the Hole.

== Album recording and EMI America's offer ==
All seemed to be going as planned when the band recorded the album for EMI America, jointly produced by MSB themselves (Michael Stanley Band), and the in-demand music engineer, mixer and producer Bob Clearmountain, and was released in 1983.

However, the band's contract with EMI America was nearing its end. EMI America would only offer the Cleveland, Ohio based band a six-month extension on their existing contract. Group leader, Michael Stanley felt unfairly slighted by the offer and for not being given due consideration for what he saw as the band's obvious success in the preceding albums and singles. Based on this instinct, Stanley turned down the offer by the record label.

Immediately, EMI America dropped The Michael Stanley Band and terminated all subsequent tour support and on-air radio promotion. Stanley later said he honestly believed that their initial offer was just that, that they would reconsider his position, and he wholly felt EMI would come back with a better deal after he turned down their "opening" bid, but they "called his bluff" and cancelled negotiations. EMI appears to have never had the intention of granting the issue anymore time, felt the six-month extension was a more than fair offer, and when Stanley said he was not interested, the label took this as a sign that their services were no longer wanted.

The album highlights tenor saxophonist Rick Bell throughout the record which is ironic as he would leave following EMI dropping the group, most notably on the song Highlife written by Michael Stanley. The band also experienced personnel changes during the lead up to the recording of this album, lead guitarist Gary Markasky left the unit and replacement Danny Powers joined, showcased on the offering is his considerable skills at playing leads.

== Final single successes for the band ==
You Can't Fight Fashion produced two noteworthy singles, including the band's second biggest hit, rock anthem "My Town", reaching number #39 on the Billboard Hot 100 in 1983. This "call to arms" would be the second highest-charting single ever for the group. The song is rumored to have been recorded in up to one hundred city specific versions as is stated by the reviews of the album, and is played by The Ohio State University Marching Band during athletic events. The haunting love song "Someone Like You" (sung by the band's Kevin Raleigh) was their final hit and reached #75 on the Billboard Magazine charts in 1984.

== Track listing ==
No.	Title	Writer(s)	Length
1.	"Hard Time"	Michael Stanley	4:25
2.	"Just Give Me Tonight"	Stanley	4:31
3.	"Someone Like You"	Kevin Raleigh	5:47
4.	"Highlife"	Stanley	5:04
5.	"My Town"	Stanley	3:58
6.	"The Damage Is Done"	Raleigh	5:04
7.	"Fire in the Hole"	Stanley	4:12
8.	"How Can You Call This Love"	Raleigh	4:20
9.	"Just How Good (A Bad Woman Feels)"	Stanley	4:41
Total length:			42:02

== Production ==
- Recorded at: Boogie Hotel (Port Jefferson, New York, Bearsville Sound Studio (Bearsville, New York), The Power Station (New York, New York)

=== Weekly charts ===
Chart (1983)	Song	Peak position	Reference
U.S. Billboard Hot 100	"My Town"	39	
U.S. "Billboard" Hot 100	"Someone Like You"	75	
