= Insects vs Robots =

American band (2009–2016)

- Origin: Venice, California, U.S.
- Genres: Folk, psychedelic rock
- Years active: 2009–2016
- Labels: Nice and Friendly; United Jams Foundation
- Past members: Milo Gonzalez; Micah Nelson; Jeff Smith; Nikita Sorokin; Tony Peluso; Maggie Lally
- Website: Official website

Insects vs Robots was a five-piece band from Venice, California. They were known to employ unusual instruments such as the violin, charango, harp, banjo, kazoo, harmonium, and sitar. They gained a reputation for having a captivating live performance and diverse sound, created from a large blend of influences.

== Discography ==
=== Albums ===
- Geryl & the Great Homunculus (2010)
- Tales from the Blue House (2011)
- Insects vs Robots (2013)
- Theyllkillyaa (2016)

=== EPs ===
- Insects vs Robots (2009)
- Stupid Dreams (2016)
