= Paula Nelson =

American singer and disc jockey (born 1969)

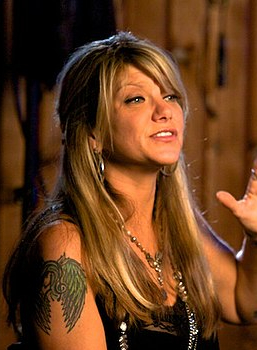
- Nelson in 2011
- Born: Paula Carlene Nelson; October 27, 1969 (age 56); Houston, Texas, U.S.
- Occupations: Singer; musician; songwriter; DJ
- Father: Willie Nelson
- Relatives: Bobbie Nelson (aunt)

Paula Carlene Nelson (born October 27, 1969) is an American country music singer and disc jockey. She is the daughter of country music singer and musician Willie Nelson.

== Early life ==
Nelson was born to Willie Nelson and Connie Koepke, while Willie Nelson was married to Shirley Collie Nelson. When Shirley found out about the birth, she divorced him. Willie Nelson then married Koepke. Nelson and Koepke had another daughter, Amy Lee Nelson, before divorcing in 1988.

As a child, Paula often went on tour with her father. Country singers such as Waylon Jennings and Jessi Colter were frequently around.

When Paula was a child, the family moved to Colorado; they lived in Conifer, Colorado, and Upper Bear Creek, near Evergreen, Colorado. At age 16, the family moved to Austin, Texas, and Paula attended Westlake High School. She began to do drugs, including cocaine, then attended a drug rehabilitation clinic in San Diego.

== Career ==
She has released the following albums:

- Coming Home (1998)
- Fireflies (2000)
- Lucky 13 (2008) (with the Paula Nelson Band)
- Little City (2010)
- Under the Influence (covers album, 2014)

She sang a duet with Willie Nelson, a cover of "Have You Ever Seen the Rain?", on his 2013 album of duets, To All the Girls....

For four years, she was a DJ at the Texas radio station KDRP-LP, or "Sun Radio". She hosts "The Paula Nelson Show" on weekdays on the Outlaw Country channel on Sirius XM Radio. Since 2016, she has also hosted a Monday-to-Thursday show on the Willie's Roadhouse channel (named after her father), also on Sirius XM.

Nelson is also a car racing aficionado, and was an occasional stunt driver for the TV show Friday Night Lights.

In October 2016, she was awarded "Female Artist of Year" by the Country Music Association of Texas.

== Personal life ==
Nelson was briefly married in the mid-2000s.

She holds a black belt in Taekwondo.

In 2014, Nelson was arrested for possession of marijuana while on tour in Menard, Texas, and briefly jailed. Police had originally stopped her tour bus for speeding, then decided to search the bus for drugs when they found out that she was on board.
