= Greatest Hits (The Oak Ridge Boys album) =

Greatest hits album by The Oak Ridge Boys
- Released: October 30, 1980
- Genre: Country
- Length: 30:37
- Label: MCA
- Producer: Ron Chancey

The Oak Ridge Boys chronology
Together (1980)	Greatest Hits (1980)	Fancy Free (1981)

Greatest Hits is a compilation album by the Oak Ridge Boys, released in 1980. It includes ten hits from their first four albums.

== Track listing ==
1. "You're the One" (Bob Morrison) (2:58) from the album Y'all Come Back Saloon
2. "I'll Be True to You" (Alan Rhody) (3:39) from the album Y'all Come Back Saloon
3. "Trying to Love Two Women" (Sonny Throckmorton) (2:28) from the album Together
4. "Cryin' Again" (Rafe Van Hoy, Don Cook) (2:29) from the album Room Service
5. "Dream On" (Dennis Lambert, Brian Potter) (3:15) from the album The Oak Ridge Boys Have Arrived
6. "Leaving Louisiana in the Broad Daylight" (Rodney Crowell, Donivan Cowart) (3:00) From the album The Oak Ridge Boys Have Arrived
7. "Heart of Mine" (Michael Foster) (3:27) from the album Together
8. "Come On In" (Michael Clark) (2:56) from the album Room Service
9. "Sail Away" (Van Hoy) (3:30) from the album The Oak Ridge Boys Have Arrived
10. "Y'all Come Back Saloon" (Sharon Vaughn) (2:55) from the album Y'all Come Back Saloon

== Personnel ==
- Duane Allen
- Joe Bonsall
- William Lee Golden
- Richard Sterban

== Charts ==
=== Weekly charts ===
Chart (1980)	Peak position
Canadian Country Albums (RPM)	13
US Billboard 200	99
US Top Country Albums (Billboard)	5

=== Year-end charts ===
Chart (1981)	Position
US Top Country Albums (Billboard)	9
Chart (1982)	Position
US Top Country Albums (Billboard)	20
