= Greatest Hits (Sawyer Brown album) =

Greatest hits album by Sawyer Brown
- Released: August 27, 1990
- Recorded: 1984–1990
- Genre: Country
- Length: 30:36
- Label: Capitol/Curb
- Producer: Various

Sawyer Brown chronology
The Boys Are Back (1989)	Greatest Hits (1990)	Buick (1991)

Singles from Greatest Hits
- 1. "When Love Comes Callin'" Released: October 6, 1990

Professional ratings
Review scores
Source	Rating
Allmusic	4/5 stars

Greatest Hits is the first compilation album by American country music band Sawyer Brown. It was released in 1990 on Capitol Records, and it features nine singles from the band's first six albums, as well as the track "When Love Comes Callin'", which was released as a single. No songs from Somewhere in the Night or Wide Open are included, despite the former yielding a No. 2 hit ("This Missin' You Heart of Mine").

== Track listing ==
No.	Title	Writer(s)	Length
1.	"Step That Step"	Mark Miller	2:47
2.	"Heart Don't Fall Now"	Bill LaBounty, Carolyn Swilley, Beckie Foster	3:21
3.	"Betty's Bein' Bad"	Marshall Chapman	3:15
4.	"The Race Is On"	Don Rollins	2:53
5.	"When Love Comes Callin'"	Miller, Randy Scruggs	2:44
6.	"Puttin' the Dark Back into the Night"	Miller	3:06
7.	"Leona"	Bill Shore, David Wills	3:01
8.	"Used to Blue"	LaBounty, J. Fred Knobloch	3:19
9.	"Out Goin' Cattin'" (featuring Cat Joe Bonsall)	Miller, Scruggs	2:52
10.	"Shakin'"	Miller, Scruggs	3:16

== Charts ==
=== Weekly charts ===
Chart (1990)	Peak position
US Top Country Albums (Billboard)	26

=== Year-end charts ===
Chart (1991)	Position
US Top Country Albums (Billboard)	52

== Certifications ==
Region	Certification	Certified units/sales
Canada (Music Canada)	Gold	50,000^{^}
^{^} Shipments figures based on certification alone.
