= A Tribute to the Delmore Brothers =

Studio album by The Louvin Brothers
- Released: 1960
- Recorded: May 12–16, 1960
- Genre: Country
- Label: Capitol
- Producer: Ken Nelson

The Louvin Brothers chronology
| My Baby's Gone (1960) | A Tribute to the Delmore Brothers (1960) | Encore (1961) |

A Tribute to the Delmore Brothers is an album by American country music duo The Louvin Brothers, released in 1960.

The Delmore Brothers were country music pioneers and stars of the Grand Ole Opry in the 1930s.

== Reception ==
Professional ratings
Review scores
| Source | Rating |
|---|---|
| Allmusic | 5/5 stars |
| No Depression | A |

In his Allmusic review, Bruce Eder stated: "You could listen to music for 50 years and not hear harmonies as sweet or playing as nimble as what's on A Tribute to the Delmore Brothers. The album was one top-flight brother harmony duo paying tribute to the first great brother harmony duo in recording history."

Music critic Bob Yates of No Depression wrote, "...the great songs of the Delmores sung by country music’s finest brother duet... rightly ranks as one of the music’s best tribute albums."

== Reissues ==
- In 1992, all of the tracks from A Tribute to the Delmore Brothers were included in the Close Harmony 8-CD box set issued by Bear Family Records.
- A Tribute to the Delmore Brothers was reissued on CD by Capitol in 1996.
- A Tribute to the Delmore Brothers was reissued on CD by Capitol in 1999 with Country Love Ballads.
- A Tribute to the Delmore Brothers was reissued on CD by Capitol Nashville in 2007.

== Track listing ==
All songs by Alton Delmore and Rabon Delmore unless otherwise noted.

1. "Weary Lonesome Blues" – 2:42
2. "Midnight Special" (Traditional) – 2:40
3. "Blues Stay Away From Me" (A. Delmore, R. Delmore, Wayne Raney, Henry Glover) – 3:21
4. "Sand Mountain Blues" – 2:28
5. "Southern Moon" – 2:38
6. "Nashville Blues" – 2:53
7. "Brown's Ferry Blues" – 2:53
8. "When It's Time for the Whippoorwill to Sing" – 2:09
9. "Freight Train Boogie" – 3:01
10. "Put Me on the Trail to Carolina" – 3:10
11. "Gonna Lay Down My Old Guitar" – 2:45
12. "The Last Old Shovel" (Traditional) – 2:20

== Personnel ==
- Charlie Louvin – vocals, guitar
- Ira Louvin – vocals, tenor guitar
- Jimmy Capps – guitar
- Junior Huskey – bass

Production notes:

- Ken Nelson – producer
