= Ira and Charlie =

Studio album by The Louvin Brothers
- Released: 1958
- Genre: Country
- Length: 31:10
- Label: Capitol

The Louvin Brothers chronology
Nearer My God to Thee (1957)	Ira and Charlie (1958)	The Family Who Prays (1958)

Ira and Charlie is an album by American country music duo The Louvin Brothers, released in 1958.

== Reception ==
Professional ratings
Review scores
Source	Rating
Allmusic	3/5 stars

Writing for Allmusic, music critic Richie Unterberger wrote of the album "It's solid enough, but some of their other Capitol work (such as the 1960 LP My Baby's Gone) is more imaginative, and places a greater weight on original material."

== Reissues ==
- In 2008, Ira and Charlie was reissued by Raven records along with Country Love Ballads. Six bonus tracks were included.
- In 1992, all of the tracks from Ira and Charlie were included in the Close Harmony 8-CD box set issued by Bear Family Records.

== Track listing ==
1. "Don't Let Your Sweet Love Die" (Zeke Manners, Clark Van Ness) – 2:36
2. "We Could" (Felice Bryant) – 2:13
3. "Tennessee Waltz" (Redd Stewart, Pee Wee King) – 2:26
4. "Are You Teasing Me" (Charlie Louvin, Ira Louvin) – 2:54
5. "Too Late" (Jimmy Wakely) – 3:06
6. "Here Today and Gone Tomorrow" (Wally Fowler) – 2:19
7. "I Wonder Where You Are Tonight" (Peter Bond) – 2:41
8. "Have I Stayed Away Too Long" (Frank Loesser) – 2:29
9. "Nobody's Darling But Mine" (Jimmie Davis) – 2:44
10. "Why Not Confess" (Ralph Hamrick) – 2:33
11. "Making Believe" (Jimmy Work) – 2:23
12. "Take Me Back into Your Heart" (Gene Autry, Fred Rose) – 2:46

== Personnel ==
- Charlie Louvin – vocals, guitar
- Ira Louvin – vocals, mandolin
