= Satan Is Real =

Studio album by The Louvin Brothers
- Released: November 16, 1959
- Recorded: August 8–10, 1958
- Genre: Gospel country
- Length: 31:54
- Label: Capitol
- Producer: Ken Nelson, John Johnson (Reissue)

The Louvin Brothers chronology
Country Love Ballads (1958)	Satan Is Real (1959)	My Baby's Gone (1960)

Satan Is Real is a gospel country album by American country music duo The Louvin Brothers, released in 1959.

== History ==
Producer Ken Nelson set up recording sessions in August 1958 to record enough tracks for two albums. The first was to become Country Love Ballads, the second the gospel music for Satan is Real. Over 20 songs were recorded in a seven-day span.

The 3-minute title-track, with only two sung choruses, is largely taken up by a personal narrative monologue describing the dangers of Satan.

== Cover ==
Designed by Ira Louvin, the cover features the brothers standing in a rock quarry, dressed in matching spotless white suits and black ties, in front of a 12-foot-tall (3.7 m) plywood rendition of the Devil, as several hidden tires soaked in kerosene burn behind them as fire and brimstone.

== Reception ==
Professional ratings
Review scores
Source	Rating
Allmusic	5/5 stars
No Depression	(A)
PopMatters	5/5 stars

While reviewers have generally commented on the distinctive album cover, they have also highly praised the song writing and performances. Mark Deming stated in his AllMusic review: "You don't need to share the Louvin Brothers' spiritual beliefs to be moved by the grace, beauty and lack of pretension of this music; Satan Is Real is music crafted by true believers sharing their faith, and its power goes beyond Christian doctrine into something at once deeply personal and truly universal, and the result is the Louvin Brothers' masterpiece."

Don Yates of No Depression called the album a "bold statement of its title signified the uncompromising nature of the Louvins’ beliefs. Whereas much country gospel of the ’50s was filled with feel-good platitudes that reflected the general optimism of the time, the Louvins’ gospel songs mirrored their own fire-and-brimstone Christianity... the album is an essential document of a side of the Louvins’ music that was at least as important to them as their more famous secular recordings."

Critic Scott Walden compared the Louvins' music to the Velvet Underground; "Their comprehension of the tortured throes of a drunkard's Satan-infested soul are no less profound than Lou Reed's own understanding of a heroin junkie wrestling with a world devoid of meaning beyond the piercing tip of the needle... The depth is there in Satan is Real. This album transcends the immediate kitsch appeal of its cover. There is a reason why songs from this album have been performed by the more commonly accepted genius of artists such as Gram Parsons, Johnny Cash, and Emmylou Harris."

Singer-songwriter Brennen Leigh called Satan is Real "an absolutely beautiful, sincere, wonderful gospel album." She added, "It's got some stuff in it that might be off-putting to some modern audiences, but I would urge the listener of this record, if you're new to it -- if you can appreciate the spirituality in it, do. If you can't, listen to it for sonic value. Because the sonic value and the musical value of this record, there isn't anything better."

== Cultural legacy ==
"The Christian Life" was covered by The Byrds on their 1968 country rock album Sweetheart of the Rodeo.

"Satan's Jeweled Crown" was covered by Emmylou Harris on her 1975 album Elite Hotel.

The opening bars of the album's title track "Satan is Real" can be heard at the beginning of Hank Williams III's "Medley: Straight to Hell / Satan is Real", on his Straight to Hell album of 2006. It is also excerpted in Will Ferrell's 2009 one-man Broadway show You're Welcome America. A Final Night With George W Bush.

In 2009, They Might Be Giants released Here Comes Science, their fourth children's album. One of the album's songs was titled "Science is Real", and was accompanied by merchandise that parodied this album's cover, replacing the image of Satan with an erupting volcano.

The 2010 Christmas album Santa Is Real, by social media site Red State Update, parodies both the album's title and cover.

Martin Guitars released a commemorative guitar featuring the Satan Is Real album cover in 2014.

In 2020, Oakland, California band Idiot Grins released Thoughts and Prayers, a song for song cover of Satan is Real.

In 2024, Gravity Falls creator Alex Hirsch parodied the cover and title with a fictional song called Cipher Is Real for The Book of Bill. It was later officially released.

== Reissues ==
- In 1992, all of the tracks from Satan Is Real were included in the Close Harmony 8-CD box set issued by Bear Family Records.
- Satan is Real was reissued on CD by Capitol in 1996.
- In 2007, Satan Is Real was reissued by Raven records along with Tragic Songs of Life. Four bonus tracks were included.
- In 2011, a remastered CD reissue included an interview of Charlie Louvin, and a second disc of Louvin Brothers songs picked by such songwriters as Beck, Kris Kristofferson and Dolly Parton. It was reissued on vinyl on the Light in the Attic label.

== Track listing ==
1. "Satan Is Real" (Charlie Louvin, Ira Louvin) – 3:00
2. "There's a Higher Power" (Louvin, Louvin) – 2:21
3. "The Christian Life" (Louvin, Louvin) – 2:16
4. "The River of Jordan" (Hazel Houser) – 2:17
5. "The Kneeling Drunkard's Plea" (Maybelle Carter, Anita Carter, Helen Carter, June Carter Cash) – 2:51
6. "Are You Afraid to Die" (Louvin, Louvin, Eddie Hill) – 2:33
7. "He Can Be Found" (Ella Barrett, Faye Cunningham) – 2:14
8. "Dying from Home, And Lost" (Traditional) – 2:46
9. "The Drunkard's Doom" (Louvin, Louvin) – 3:14
10. "Satan's Jeweled Crown" (Edgar Eden) – 2:56
11. "The Angels Rejoiced Last Night" (Louvin, Louvin) – 2:18
12. "I'm Ready to Go Home" (Houser) – 3:08

== Personnel ==
- Charlie Louvin – vocals, guitar
- Ira Louvin – vocals, mandolin
- George McCormick – guitar, vocals
- Jimmy Capps – guitar
- Paul Yandell – guitar
- Ray Edenton – guitar
- Marvin Hughes – piano, organ
- Floyd "Lightnin'" Chance – bass
- Buddy Harman – drums

Production notes:

- Ken Nelson – producer
- John Johnson – reissue producer
- Joe Allison – liner notes
- Charles K. Wolfe – reissue liner notes
