= Tragic Songs of Life =

Studio album by The Louvin Brothers
- Released: October 1956
- Recorded: May 2–4, 1956
- Studio: Bradley's Recording Studios (later Columbia Studios Nashville)
- Genre: Country; folk
- Length: 35:55
- Label: Capitol
- Producer: Ken Nelson

The Louvin Brothers chronology
Tragic Songs of Life (1956)	Nearer My God to Thee (1957)

Alternative Cover
- Cover of the CD reissue.

Singles from Tragic Songs of Life
- 1. "Knoxville Girl"/"I Wish It Had Been a Dream" Released: 1959

Tragic Songs of Life is the debut album by American country music duo The Louvin Brothers, released in 1956. "Knoxville Girl" was released as a single three years later and reached number 19 on the Billboard Country Singles chart.

== History ==
Having previously recorded one single for Apollo Records and a series of sides for Decca, the Louvins signed with Capitol Records in 1952. They recorded over ten singles for Capitol, with the earliest all Gospel songs, before "When I Stop Dreaming" became their first secular release in 1955. Tragic Songs of Life was their Capitol debut, and served as somewhat of a concept album, drawing heavily on artists they admired such as Bill Monroe, The Monroe Brothers, The Blue Sky Boys, and The Callahan Brothers. The majority of the songs are tragic heartbreak and misfortune songs and classic murder ballads.

== Reception ==
Professional ratings
Review scores
Source	Rating
Allmusic	5/5 stars
No Depression	(A)

Mark Deming stated in his Allmusic review "...this is a landmark of traditional country music that remains powerful more than fifty years after it was recorded." Don Yates of No Depression magazine singled out the Louvins' version of “In The Pines” writing "It’s perhaps their most powerful rendering of traditional folk music’s bleak vision of a dark and forlorn land, where love is absent and death is the only certainty. It’s the centerpiece of what is arguably the Louvins' finest album." The album is also included in the book 1001 Albums You Must Hear Before You Die.

== Reissues ==
- In 1992, all of the tracks from Tragic Songs of Life were included in the Close Harmony 8-CD box set issued by Bear Family Records.
- Tragic Songs of Life was reissued on CD by Capitol in 1996.
- Tragic Songs of Life was reissued on CD by Raven records in 2007 along with Satan Is Real. Four bonus tracks were included.

== Track listing ==
1. "Kentucky" (Karl Davis) – 2:40
2. "I'll Be All Smiles Tonight" (A. P. Carter) – 3:14
3. "Let Her Go, God Bless Her" (Traditional) – 2:55
4. "What Is Home Without Love" (Traditional) – 3:00
5. "A Tiny Broken Heart" (Charlie Louvin, Ira Louvin, Eddie Hill) – 2:34
6. "In the Pines" (Traditional, Alan Riggs) – 3:15
7. "Alabama" (C. Louvin, I. Louvin, Hill) – 2:43
8. "Katie Dear" (William Bolick) – 2:34
9. "My Brother's Will" (Ken Nelson) – 3:16
10. "Knoxville Girl" (Traditional) – 3:49
11. "Take the News to Mother" (Walter "Joe" Callahan, Homer "Bill" Callahan, W. R. Caloway) – 2:48
12. "Mary of the Wild Moor" (Traditional, Dennis Turner) – 3:11

== Personnel ==
- Charlie Louvin – vocals, guitar
- Ira Louvin – vocals, mandolin
- Paul Yandell – guitar

Production notes:

- Ken Nelson – producer
- John Johnson – reissue producer
