= Encore (The Louvin Brothers album) =

Compilation album by The Louvin Brothers
- Released: 1961
- Recorded: 1956–1960
- Genre: Country
- Length: 29:02
- Label: Capitol
- Producer: Ken Nelson

The Louvin Brothers chronology
A Tribute to the Delmore Brothers (1960)	Encore (1961)	Christmas with the Louvin Brothers (1961)

Encore is an album by American country music duo The Louvin Brothers, released in 1961. It is made up of singles and B-sides previously released by Capitol, dating as far back as 1957. It includes the Louvin's number 7 Country Singles hit, "Cash on the Barrel Head".

== Reissues ==
- In 1992, all of the tracks from Encore were included in the Close Harmony 8-CD box set issued by Bear Family Records.
- Encore was reissued on CD by Capitol Nashville in 2007.

== Track listing ==
All songs by Ira Louvin and Charlie Louvin unless otherwise noted.

1. "Childish Love" – 2:32
2. "Love Is a Lonely Street" (Ella Barrett, Faye Cunningham) – 2:41
3. "If You Love Me Stay Away" – 2:10
4. "Cash on the Barrel Head " – 2:39
5. "New Partner Waltz" – 2:19
6. "Stagger" – 2:10
7. "Ruby's Song" – 2:22
8. "Nellie Moved to Town" – 2:43
9. "What a Change One Day Can Make" (Grady Cole) – 2:21
10. "Call Me" – 2:18
11. "You're Learning" – 2:21
12. "My Curly Headed Baby" (Traditional) – 2:26

== Personnel ==
- Charlie Louvin – vocals, guitar
- Ira Louvin – vocals, mandolin
- Jimmy Capps – guitar
- Paul Yandell – lead guitar
- Don Helms – pedal steel guitar
- George McCormick – rhythm guitar
- Floyd Chance – bass
- Buddy Harman – drums

Production notes:

- Ken Nelson – producer
