= Nearer My God to Thee (album) =

Studio album by The Louvin Brothers
- Released: 1957
- Genre: Bluegrass gospel
- Label: Capitol
- Producer: Ken Nelson

The Louvin Brothers chronology
Tragic Songs of Life (1956)	Nearer My God to Thee (1957)	Ira and Charlie (1958)

Professional ratings
Review scores
Source	Rating
Allmusic	4.5/5 stars

Nearer My God to Thee is a bluegrass gospel album by American country music duo The Louvin Brothers, released in 1957.

It was the duo's first Gospel album for Capitol after the release of several Gospel singles from 1952 to 1955. All those single releases would later be collected on one album, The Family Who Prays.

== Reissues ==
- In 1992, all of the tracks from Nearer My God to Thee were included in the Close Harmony 8-CD box set issued by Bear Family Records.
- In 2002, Nearer My God to Thee was reissued by King Records.
- In 2007, Nearer My God to Thee was reissued by Capitol Nashville Records.

== Track listing ==
1. "Are You Washed in the Blood?" (Mark Johnson, Traditional) – 2:25
2. "Nearer, My God, to Thee" (Lowell Mason, Traditional) – 2:49
3. "Wait a Little Longer, Please Jesus" (Hazel Houser, Smith) – 2:48
4. "I Can't Say No" (Ira Louvin, Charlie Louvin) – 2:37
5. "I Won't Have to Cross Jordan Alone" (C. E. Dunham, T. Ramsey) – 2:26
6. "There's No Excuse" (Louvin, Louvin) – 3:02
7. "This Little Light of Mine" (Traditional) – 2:32
8. "Praying" (Hazel Houser) – 2:43
9. "Thankful" (Louvin, Louvin) – 2:57
10. "Lord, I'm Coming Home" (Traditional) – 3:15
11. "Last Chance to Pray" (Louvin, Louvin) – 2:42
12. "I Steal Away and Pray" (Louvin, Louvin) – 2:28

== Personnel ==
- Charlie Louvin – vocals, guitar
- Ira Louvin – vocals, mandolin
