= Somewhere in the Night =

Somewhere in the Night may refer to:

- Somewhere in the Night (film), a 1946 film noir by Joseph L. Mankiewicz
- Somewhere in the Night (Sawyer Brown album), 1987
- Somewhere in the Night (Teri Thornton album), 1963
- "Somewhere in the Night" (Helen Reddy song), 1975; also recorded by Batdorf & Rodney and others; covered by Barry Manilow (1978)
- "Somewhere in the Night" (The Oak Ridge Boys song), 1981; covered by Sawyer Brown, 1987
