= Less and Less =

Studio album by Charlie Louvin
- Released: December 1964
- Recorded: 1964
- Genre: Country
- Label: Capitol
- Producer: Marvin Hughes

Charlie Louvin chronology
Less and Less (1964)	The Many Moods of Charlie Louvin (1965)

Less and Less (more completely Less and Less & I Don't Love You Anymore) is the debut album by American country music singer Charlie Louvin, released in 1964. The album is titled after Louvin's first two solo singles. Both reached the Billboard Country Singles top 40 chart; "Less and Less" reached number 27 and "I Don't Love You Anymore" peaked at number 4. "See the Big Man Cry" was released as a single in 1965 and reached number 7. The album reached number 6 on the Billboard Country Albums chart.

== History ==
Louvin performed country and Gospel music with his brother Ira for many years as the successful duo The Louvin Brothers. They recorded twelve Top 40 Country singles and over a dozen albums. After breaking up in 1963, each began a solo career. Ira died on June 20, 1965, when a drunken driver struck his car.

"Just Between the Two of Us" later became a hit for Merle Haggard and Bonnie Owens.

== Reception ==
Professional ratings
Review scores
Source	Rating
Allmusic	4/5 stars

Greg Adams has since called it a strong album and wrote in his Allmusic review: "Although his solo sides for Capitol are less essential and were less successful on the charts overall [than later releases], they are very good and deserve to be reissued."

== Track listing ==
All songs by Charlie & Ira Louvin unless otherwise noted.

1. "I Don't Love You Anymore" (Bill Anderson) – 2:30
2. "I'll Have Made It to the Bridge" – 2:45
3. "Once a Day" (Bill Anderson) – 2:20
4. "Just Between the Two of Us" (Liz Anderson) – 2:58
5. "I'm No Longer in Your Heart" – 2:30
6. "I Don't Want It" (Lonnie Coleman) – 2:18
7. "Less and Less" (Roger Miller) – 2:23
8. "See the Big Man Cry" – 3:03
9. "I Think I'll Live" – 2:49
10. "Plenty of Everything But You" – 2:33
11. "What Can Any Man Do" – 2:49
12. "Tall Dark Stranger" – 3:14
