= My Baby's Gone =

My Baby's Gone may refer to:

- My Baby's Gone (album), a 1960 album by the Louvin Brothers, or the title song
- "My Baby's Gone" (song), a song by the Judds, also recorded by Sawyer Brown
