= My Baby's Gone (album) =

Studio album by The Louvin Brothers
- Released: 1960
- Genre: Country
- Length: 28:48
- Label: Capitol
- Producer: Ken Nelson

The Louvin Brothers chronology
Satan Is Real (1959)	My Baby's Gone (1960)	A Tribute to the Delmore Brothers (1960)

Singles from My Baby's Gone
- 1. "My Baby Came Back"/"She Didn't Even Know I Was Gone" Released: 1958; 2. "My Baby's Gone"/"Lorene" Released: 1958

My Baby's Gone is an album by American country music duo The Louvin Brothers, released in 1960. The lead-off single "My Baby Came Back" b/w "She Didn't Even Know I Was Gone" did not chart although the follow-up single "My Baby's Gone" b/w "Lorene" reached number 9 on the Billboard Country Singles chart.

== Background ==
The majority of the songs were recorded in 1958 and four had been released as singles that year. The duo had previously recorded gospel songs written by Hazel Houser, but "My Baby's Gone" was the only secular song of hers they recorded. It stayed on the Billboard Country Singles chart for over 20 weeks and peaked at number 9. "I Wish It Had Been a Dream" had also been released as a single although it didn't chart well. The album cover featuring a despondent looking man was designed by the brothers.

== Reissues ==
- In 1992, all of the tracks from My Baby's Gone were included in the Close Harmony 8-CD box set issued by Bear Family Records.

== Reception ==
Professional ratings
Review scores
Source	Rating
Allmusic	4.5/5 stars
Record Collector	3/5 stars

In his review for Allmusic, critic Timothy Monger wrote the album "finds them back on the dark side, delivering a dozen haunting songs of heartbreak and woe that are every bit as masterful as the fire-and-brimstone fury of their previous LP... If Satan Is Real is the height of the duo's gospel style, then My Baby's Gone is the Louvin Brothers at their country best." Kris Needs of Record Collector called the album "an overlooked masterpiece, essential for anyone partial to a time-honoured wallow in the saddest music known to man. When those vocals seem to realise they have nothing but themselves to hold on to the effect is spine-chilling."

== Track listing ==
All songs by Charlie Louvin and Ira Louvin unless otherwise noted.

1. "My Baby's Gone" (Hazel Houser) – 2:40
2. "Blue From Now On" (Jim Leisy) – 2:11
3. "When I Loved You" – 2:35
4. "She Didn't Even Know I Was Gone" – 2:18
5. "You're Running Wild" (Don Winters, Ray Edenton) – 2:14
6. "Plenty of Everything But You" – 2:26
7. "I Wish You Knew" – 2:26
8. "While You're Cheating on Me" – 2:02
9. "Lorene" – 1:58
10. "I Wish It Had Been a Dream" – 2:29
11. "The First One to Love You" (Helen Carter) – 2:37
12. "My Baby Came Back" – 2:11

== Personnel ==
- Charlie Louvin – vocals, guitar
- Ira Louvin – vocals, mandolin
- Paul Yandell – guitar
- "Smiley" Wilson – guitar
- Floyd T. "Lightning' Chance – bass
- Buddy Harman – drums
- Marvin Hughes – piano

Production notes:

- Ken Nelson – producer
