= The Family Who Prays =

Compilation album by The Louvin Brothers
- Released: 1958
- Recorded: 1952–1958
- Genre: Country, gospel
- Label: Capitol

The Louvin Brothers chronology
Ira and Charlie (1958)	The Family Who Prays (1958)	Country Love Ballads (1958)

The Family Who Prays is a Gospel album by American country music duo The Louvin Brothers, released in 1958.

All the songs had previously been singles released by Capitol from 1952-1955.

== Reissues ==
- In 1992, all of the tracks from The Family Who Prays were included in the Close Harmony 8-CD box set issued by Bear Family Records.
- In 2008, The Family Who Prays was reissued by Country Stars Records along with fourteen additional tracks. "Swing Low Sweet Chariot" and "God Bless Her (Cause She's My Mother)" were omitted.

== Track listing ==
All songs by Ira Louvin and Charlie Louvin unless otherwise noted.

1. "The Family Who Prays (Shall Never Part)"
2. "Born Again"
3. "If We Forget God"
4. "Satan Lied to Me"
5. "God Bless Her (Cause She's My Mother)"
6. "Love Thy Neighbor as Thy Self"
7. "Preach the Gospel"
8. "Just Rehearsing"
9. "Pray for Me"
10. "Satan and the Saint"
11. "Swing Low, Sweet Chariot" (Traditional)
12. "Make Him a Soldier"

== Personnel ==
- Charlie Louvin – vocals, guitar
- Ira Louvin – vocals, mandolin
