= Together (The Oak Ridge Boys album) =

Studio album by Oak Ridge Boys
- Released: March 30, 1980
- Genre: Country
- Label: MCA
- Producer: Ron Chancey

Oak Ridge Boys chronology
The Oak Ridge Boys Have Arrived (1979)	Together (1980)	Greatest Hits (1980)

Singles from Together
- 1. "Trying to Love Two Women" Released: April 19, 1980; 2. "Heart of Mine" Released: July 19, 1980; 3. "Beautiful You" Released: November 15, 1980

Together is the sixth major studio album by The Oak Ridge Boys, released in 1980. The album appeared on the Billboard 200 on March 29, 1980, staying for six weeks and reaching a peak position of #154, and made the Top 10 on the Top Country Albums chart.

== Track listing ==
No.	Title	Writer(s)	Length
1.	"Whiskey Lady"	Glenn Ashworth, Gregg Owen, Dana Sigmon, Jack Watts	2:54
2.	"Ready to Take My Chances"	Helen Cornelius, Dewayne Orender	2:32
3.	"Trying to Love Two Women"	Sonny Throckmorton	2:28
4.	"Heart of Mine"	Michael Foster	3:26
5.	"Beautiful You"	Dave Hanner	4:07
6.	"Take This Heart"	Robin Batteau	3:47
7.	"Love Takes Two"	Red Lane, Danny Morrison	3:01
8.	"A Little More Like Me (The Crucifixion)"	Sonny Throckmorton	3:12
9.	"I Can't Imagine Laying Down (With Anyone but You)"	Don Schlitz	2:29
10.	"Holdin' on to You"	Dennis Linde, Alan Rush	3:50

== Personnel ==
=== The Oak Ridge Boys ===
- Duane Allen - lead
- Joe Bonsall - tenor
- William Lee Golden - baritone
- Richard Sterban - bass

=== Additional Musicians ===
- Jimmy Capps, Bobby Thompson, Chip Young - acoustic guitar
- Joe Osborn, Jack Williams - bass guitar
- Kenny Buttrey - drums
- Billy Sanford, Reggie Young - electric guitar
- Buddy Spicher - fiddle
- Ron Oates - keyboards
- Weldon Myrick - steel guitar
- George Binkley III, John Catchings, Marvin Chantry, Roy Christensen, Carl Gorodetzky, Sheldon Kurland, Wilfred Lehmann, Dennis Molchan, Samuel Terranova, Gary Vanosdale, Stephanie Woolf - strings
- Bergen White - string arrangements

== Chart performance ==
=== Album ===
Chart (1980)	Peak position
U.S. Billboard Top Country Albums	10
U.S. Billboard 200	154
Canadian RPM Country Albums	1

=== Singles ===
Year	Single	Peak chart positions			
Year	Single	US Country	US	US AC	CAN Country
1980	"Trying to Love Two Women"	1	—	—	1
1980	"Heart of Mine"	3	105	49	3
1980	"Beautiful You"	3	—	—	27
