= Shakin' (album) =

Studio album by Sawyer Brown
- Released: 1985
- Studio: Scruggs Sound (Berry Hill, Tennessee)
- Genre: Country
- Length: 31:43
- Label: Capitol/Curb
- Producer: Randy Scruggs

Sawyer Brown chronology
Sawyer Brown (1984)	Shakin' (1985)	Out Goin' Cattin' (1986)

Singles from Shakin'
- 1. "Betty's Bein' Bad" Released: September 1985; 2. "Heart Don't Fall Now" Released: February 1, 1986; 3. "Shakin'" Released: May 5, 1986

Shakin' is the second studio album of American country music band Sawyer Brown, released in 1985 on Capitol Records. It features the singles, "Betty's Bein' Bad," "Heart Don't Fall Now," and "Shakin'," all of which charted on the Hot Country Singles charts.

== Track listing ==
No.	Title	Writer(s)	Length
1.	"When Your Heart Goes (Woo, Woo, Woo)"	Mark Miller, Randy Scruggs	2:28
2.	"The Secretary's Song"	Beckie Foster, Bill LaBounty, Quentin Powers	2:45
3.	"Heart Don't Fall Now"	Foster, LaBounty, Carolyn Swilley	3:22
4.	"Shakin'"	Miller, Scruggs	3:15
5.	"Sharin' the Moonshine"	Miller, Scruggs	3:42
6.	"Betty's Bein' Bad"	Marshall Chapman	3:15
7.	"I Believe"	Greg Guidry, David Martin	3:50
8.	"Lonely Girls"	Miller, Scruggs	3:15
9.	"That's a No No"	Miller, Scruggs	3:07
10.	"Billy Does Your Bulldog Bite"	Ronny Scaife, Bobby Neal	2:44

== Personnel ==
- Mark Miller – lead vocals
- Gregg "Hobie" Hubbard – keyboards, backing vocals
- Bobby Randall – acoustic guitar, electric guitars, backing vocals
- Jim Scholten – bass
- Joe "Curley" Smyth – drums, percussion

== Production ==
- Randy Scruggs – producer
- Mike Bradley – engineer
- Tom Semmes – engineer
- Gene Eichelberger – remixing
- Milan Bogdan – editing
- Glenn Meadows – mastering at Masterfonics (Nashville, Tennessee)
- Roy Kohara – art direction
- John O'Brien – design
- Greg Gorman – photography

== Charts ==
=== Weekly charts ===
Chart (1986)	Peak position
US Top Country Albums (Billboard)	3

=== Year-end charts ===
Chart (1986)	Position
US Top Country Albums (Billboard)	9
