= The Knoxville Girl =

Song performed by Outlaws

Song
- Genre: Murder ballad

"The Knoxville Girl" is an Appalachian murder ballad.

== Origins ==
It is derived from the 19th-century Irish ballad "The Wexford Girl", itself derived from the earlier English ballad "The Bloody Miller or Hanged I Shall Be" (Roud 263, Laws P35) about a murder, in 1683, at Hogstow Mill, 12 miles (19 km) south of Shrewsbury. This ballad was collected by Samuel Pepys, who wrote about the murder of Anne Nichols by the Mill's apprentice Francis Cooper. Other versions are known as the "Waxweed Girl", "The Wexford Murder". These are in turn derived from an Elizabethan era poem or broadside ballad, "The Cruel Miller".

Possibly modelled on the 17th-century broadside William Grismond's Downfall, or A Lamentable Murther by him Committed at Lainterdine in the county of Hereford on March 12, 1650: Together with his lamentation., sometimes known as The Bloody Miller.

== Lyrics ==
I met a little girl in Knoxville, a town we all know well
And every Sunday evening, out in her home, I'd dwell
We went to take an evening walk about a mile from town
I picked a stick up off the ground and knocked that fair girl down

She fell down on her bended knees, for mercy she did cry
"Oh Willy dear, don't kill me here, I'm unprepared to die"
She never spoke another word, I only beat her more
Until the ground around me within her blood did flow

I took her by her golden curls and I drug her round and around
Throwing her into the river that flows through Knoxville town
Go down, go down, you Knoxville girl with the dark and roving eyes
Go down, go down, you Knoxville girl, you can never be my bride

I started back to Knoxville, got there about midnight
My mother, she was worried and woke up in a fright
Saying "Dear son, what have you done to bloody your clothes so?"
I told my anxious mother I was bleeding at my nose

I called for me a candle to light myself to bed
I called for me a handkerchief to bind my aching head
Rolled and tumbled the whole night through, as troubles was for me
Like flames of hell around my bed and in my eyes could see

They carried me down to Knoxville and put me in a cell
My friends all tried to get me out but none could go my bail
I'm here to waste my life away down in this dirty old jail
Because I murdered that Knoxville girl, the girl I loved so well

== Recordings ==
Year	Artist	Release	Notes
1924	Riley Puckett & Gid Tanner	"Knoxville Girl"	Earliest recording
1937	The Carter Family	"Never Let the Devil Get the Upper Hand of You"	
1938	The Blue Sky Boys	"In My Little Home In Tennessee/The Knoxville Girl"	
1947	Cope Brothers	Knoxville Girl / She Sleeps Beneath The Norris Dam	KING 589
1956	The Louvin Brothers	Tragic Songs of Life	(US Country #19)
1959	The Wilburn Brothers	"The Knoxville Girl/Which One Is To Blame"	(US Country #18)
1961	Kevin Shegog	?	
1963	John Duffey and the Country Gentlemen	Hootenanny – A Bluegrass Special	
1969	Jim & Jesse	Saluting The Louvin Brothers	
1972	Osborne Brothers	Bobby and Sonny	
1974	Dave Loggins	Apprentice (In A Musical Workshop)	
1975	Outlaws	Outlaws	
1978	Jimmy Martin	Me 'N Ole Pete	
1996	BR5-49	Live From Robert's	
1996	The Lemonheads	Car Button Cloth	
1996	DQE	Move into the villa villakula	
1996	Nick Cave	"Henry Lee/Knoxville Girl"	
2002	Pine Valley Cosmonauts w/Brett Sparks	The Executioner's Last Songs	
2003	The Handsome Family	Smothered and Covered	
2005	Okkervil River	Black Sheep Boy	
2005	Sweetwater	The Ballads	
2005	Roger Alan Wade	All Likkered Up	
2006	The Singing Hall Sisters	Searching for the Wrong-Eyed Jesus	
2008	Rachel Brooke	Rachel Brooke	
2009	The Fox Hunt	America's Working So We Don't Have To	
2008	The Boxmasters	The Boxmasters	
2013	Vandaveer	Oh, Willie, Please...	
2014	Beaches In Boise	Autocantata	
2015	The Ghosts Of Johnson City	Am I Born To Die?	

=== Samples ===
- Plan B in the bootleg mash-up "Paint It Blacker" (2007) as a reference to violent music existing before modern rap.

=== Parodies ===
- Patrick Sky on his album Songs That Made America Famous, as "Yonkers Girl".
- GG Allin on his album Carnival of Excess, as "Watch Me Kill".

== Uses in other media ==
The song features prominently in If Ever I Return, Pretty Peggy-O, the first book in the Ballad mystery series by Sharyn McCrumb.

== Bibliography ==
- Collin Escott. Roadkill on the Three-chord Highway: Art and Trash in American Popular Music. New York: Routledge, 2002.
