= Y'all Come Back Saloon =

Studio album by the Oak Ridge Boys
- Released: September 2, 1977
- Genre: Country
- Length: 31:42
- Label: ABC, Dot
- Producer: Ron Chancey

The Oak Ridge Boys chronology
Old Fashioned, Down Home, Hand Clappin', Foot Stompin', Southern Style, Gospel Quartet Music (1976)	Y'all Come Back Saloon (1977)	Room Service (1978)

Singles from Y'all Come Back Saloon
- 1. "Y'all Come Back Saloon" Released: July 16, 1977; 2. "I'll Be True to You" Released: April 15, 1978

Professional ratings
Review scores
Source	Rating
AllMusic	4.5/5 stars
The Rolling Stone Album Guide	3/5 stars

Y'all Come Back Saloon is a 1977 album by American vocal quartet the Oak Ridge Boys. It was their third frontline album, and their first to only include country music. Their band was included on the album cover but not heard on the album; prior releases had included the band.

Four singles were released: the title song, "You're the One", "I'll Be True to You", and "Easy". The first three singles all sold well, "Easy" was a pop hit overseas, and "I'll Be True to You" hit number one on the Billboard Hot Country Songs chart.

== Track listing ==
No.	Title	Writer(s)	Length
1.	"Y'all Come Back Saloon"	Sharon Vaughn	2:55
2.	"I'll Be True to You"	Alan Rhody	3:39
3.	"An Old Time Family Bluegrass Band"	Michael Huffman	2:46
4.	"Didn't She Really Thrill Them (Back in 1924)"	Allan Chapman	3:26
5.	"Old Time Lovin'"	Gerry House	2:47
6.	"Freckles"	Sterling Whipple	3:28
7.	"You're the One"	Bob Morrison	2:57
8.	"Let Me Be the One"	Jimbeau Hinson	3:29
9.	"Easy"	Chick Rains	3:50
10.	"Emmylou"	Buzz Cason	2:25

== Personnel ==
The Oak Ridge Boys

- Duane Allen - lead
- Joe Bonsall - tenor
- William Lee Golden - baritone
- Richard Sterban - bass

Additional musicians

- Jimmy Capps, Victor Jordan, Jerry Shook, Bobby Thompson, Chip Young - acoustic guitar
- Victor Jordan, Bobby Thompson - banjo
- Joe Osborn, Henry Strzelecki - bass guitar
- Hayward Bishop, Jerry Carrigan - drums
- Billy Sanford, Pete Wade, Reggie Young - electric guitar
- Johnny Gimble - fiddle
- David Briggs, Ron Oates - piano
- Lloyd Green - steel guitar
- Marvin Chantry, Roy Christensen, Virginia Christensen, Carl Gorodetzky, Lennie Haight, Sheldon Kurland, Steven Smith, Donald Teal, Gary Vanosdale, Stephanie Woolf - strings
- Bergen White - string arrangements
