= Nearer My God to Thee (disambiguation) =

"Nearer, My God, to Thee" is a 19th-century Christian hymn by Sarah Flower Adams.

Nearer My God to Thee may also refer to:

- Nearer My God to Thee (film), a 1917 British silent film
- "Nearer My God to Thee" (Homicide: Life on the Street), a 1994 television episode
- Nearer My God to Thee (album), a 1957 album by The Louvin Brothers
- Nearer My God to Thee, a 1995 album by Pat Boone

== See also ==
- Nearer My God, a 2018 album by Foxing
