= The Oak Ridge Boys Have Arrived =

Studio album by the Oak Ridge Boys
- Released: March 30, 1979
- Genre: Country
- Length: 33:37
- Label: ABC
- Producer: Ron Chancey

The Oak Ridge Boys chronology
| Room Service (1978) | The Oak Ridge Boys Have Arrived (1979) | Together (1980) |

Singles from The Oak Ridge Boys Have Arrived
- 1. "Sail Away" Released: April 7, 1979; 2. "Dream On" Released: August 18, 1979; 3. "Leaving Louisiana in the Broad Daylight" Released: December 1, 1979

The Oak Ridge Boys Have Arrived is the fifth frontline album by the Oak Ridge Boys, released in 1979. It reached the Top 5 on the "Billboard" Top Country Albums chart and all three singles were hits.

"Leaving Louisiana in the Broad Daylight" was previously recorded by Rodney Crowell and by Emmylou Harris. "Dancing the Night Away" was previously recorded by the Amazing Rhythm Aces, Tanya Tucker, and by Leo Sayer. "Sail Away" was previously recorded by Kenny Rogers, "Dream On" by the Righteous Brothers and Donny and Marie Osmond, and "My Radio Sure Sounds Good to Me" by Graham Central Station.

== Track listing ==
| No. | Title | Writer(s) | Length |
|---|---|---|---|
| 1. | "Sail Away" | Rafe Van Hoy | 3:30 |
| 2. | "There Must Be Something About Me That She Loves" | Sonny Throckmorton | 3:04 |
| 3. | "Sometimes the Rain Won't Let Me Sleep" | Pat Bunch, Dan Mitchell, James Price | 3:51 |
| 4. | "I Gotta Get Over This" | Don White | 2:49 |
| 5. | "My Radio Sure Sounds Good to Me" | Larry Graham | 3:11 |
| 6. | "Dream On" | Dennis Lambert, Brian Potter | 3:15 |
| 7. | "Leaving Louisiana in the Broad Daylight" | Donivan Cowart, Rodney Crowell | 2:59 |
| 8. | "Every Now and Then" | Shayne Dolan, Rock Killough | 3:11 |
| 9. | "Dig a Little Deeper In the Well" | Roger Bowling, Jody Emerson | 2:45 |
| 10. | "Dancing the Night Away" | James Brown Jr., Russell Smith | 5:02 |

== Personnel ==
The Oak Ridge Boys

- Duane Allen - lead
- Joe Bonsall - tenor
- William Lee Golden - baritone
- Richard Sterban - bass (lead vocals on "Dream On")

Additional musicians

- Jimmy Capps, Jerry Shook, Chip Young - acoustic guitar
- Bobby Thompson - banjo
- Joe Osborn - bass guitar
- Kenny Buttrey - drums
- Reggie Young - electric guitar
- Buddy Spicher - fiddle
- Roger Bissell, Dennis Good, Bill Puett, Don Sheffield, George Tidwell - horns
- Ron Oates - keyboards
- George Binkley, Marvin Chantry, Roy Christensen, Carl Gorodetzky, Lennie Haight, Sheldon Kurland, Martha McCrory, Steven Smith, Gary Vanosdale, Pamela Vanosdale, Samuel Terranova, Stephanie Woolf - strings
- Bergen White - string and horn arrangements

== Charts ==
=== Weekly charts ===
| Chart (1979) | Peak position |
|---|---|
| US Top Country Albums (Billboard) | 5 |

=== Year-end charts ===
| Chart (1979) | Position |
|---|---|
| US Top Country Albums (Billboard) | 25 |

== Singles ==
- Sail Away
- Dream On
- Leaving Louisiana in the Broad Daylight
