= Country Love Ballads =

Studio album by The Louvin Brothers
- Released: 1958
- Recorded: August 1958
- Genre: Country
- Length: 28:19
- Label: Capitol
- Producer: Ken Nelson

The Louvin Brothers chronology
The Family Who Prays (1958)	Country Love Ballads (1958)	Satan Is Real (1959)

Professional ratings
Review scores
Source	Rating
Allmusic	3.5/5 stars

Country Love Ballads is an album by American country music duo The Louvin Brothers, released in 1958.

Producer Ken Nelson set up recording sessions in August 1958 to record enough tracks for two albums. The first was to become Country Love Ballads, the second the gospel music for Satan Is Real. Over 20 songs were recorded in a seven-day span.

"If I Could Only Win Your Love" was covered by Emmylou Harris and became her first solo hit in 1975.

== Reissues ==
- In 1992, all of the tracks from Country Love Ballads were included in the Close Harmony 8-CD box set issued by Bear Family Records.
- Country Love Ballads was reissued on CD by Capitol in 1999 with A Tribute to the Delmore Brothers.
- In 2008, Country Love Ballads was reissued by Raven records along with Ira and Charlie. Six bonus tracks were included.

== Track listing ==
1. "Are You Wasting My Time" (Charlie Louvin, Ira Louvin) – 2:19
2. "If I Could Only Win Your Love" (Louvin, Louvin) – 2:19
3. "Today" (Hank Thompson) – 2:22
4. "Read What's in My Heart " (Dell Shirley) – 2:09
5. "I Wonder If You Know" (Ella Barrett) – 3:14
6. "Memories and Tears" (Jimmy Rule) – 2:19
7. "On My Way to the Show" (Louvin, Louvin) – 2:05
8. "My Heart Was Trampled on the Street" (Louvin, Louvin) – 2:28
9. "She'll Get Lonesome" (Louvin, Louvin) – 2:20
10. "Red Hen Hop" (Louvin, Louvin) – 2:11
11. "Blue" (Freddie Hart) – 2:15
12. "Send Me the Pillow That You Dream On" (Hank Locklin) – 2:18

== Personnel ==
- Charlie Louvin – vocals, guitar
- Ira Louvin – vocals, mandolin
- George McCormick – guitar, vocals
- Jimmy Capps – guitar
- Paul Yandell – guitar
- Ray Edenton – guitar
- Marvin Huges – piano, organ
- Lightning Chance – bass
- Buddy Harman – drums

Production notes:

- Ken Nelson – producer
