= Idiot Grins =

Background information
- Origin: Oakland, California
- Genres: Rock, soul
- Years active: 2010–present
- Website: http://www.idiotgrins.com/

Idiot Grins are a Rock/Soul Band from Oakland, California formed in 2010. They are best known for their single "Get Busy Dying" which was a top 10 digital radio hit, and "Not Reggae" which reached #3. The band consists of Mike Conner (Piano and Organ), Evan Eustis (Bass, Mandolin, and Vocals), John Hansen (Vocals), Michael Melgoza (Drums), and Randy Strauss (Guitars). Elmore Magazine praised the bands ability to "create their own pastiche that works to their advantage."

== Musical career ==
Idiot Grins are a Rock and Soul band from Oakland, California. They have released six albums starting with Quarry from 2012, Big Man from 2015 and 2017's State of Health featuring the Byrd Sisters. State Of Health featured the Top 10 digital radio hit "Get Busy Dying" and Top 20 digital radio hit "Take it Back".

Big Man was well received by the press. Key praise included: "Big Man is an amalgamation of music that's near and dear to them; a blend of what they accomplished before and their admiration of Stax classics. If putting a new spin on a vintage sound was their goal, then mission accomplished." by Elmore Magazine and "The entire length of Big Man is a classy, burning slice of soul, and would have easily found a home in the record shops of the 60’s." by Big Takeover.

State Of Health was perhaps the bands most critically acclaimed album. HuffPost wrote of the record: "State of Health is a scrumptious album. The melodies are catchy and drenched in charming harmonics, while the vocal harmonies set the entire album apart, especially the dulcet tones of The Byrd Sisters. If you're in the mood for some tasty, fun music, look no further." Blogcritics wrote of State of Health: "... and that's precisely what the Idiot Grins do on State of Health - resurrect the persistent, flamboyant grooves, gooey wah-wah pedals, fluid vocal harmonies, and the braying brass of Hayes' blend of psychedelia, soul, and deep southern blues." Seattle PI said of the single 'Get Busy Dying': "a dynamite soul number full of bright horns and the radiant harmonies of The Byrd Sisters. I love the intro on this song, the way it simmers with bubbling energy and then takes off. This is probably the best song on the album."

They released their new album, Thoughts & Prayers on November 6, 2020. The record is a reinterpretation of the Louvin Brothers 1959 country-gospel album Satan is Real. On Thoughts & Prayers, the band cover songs including "Satan is Real", "The Christian Life" and "The Angels Rejoiced." Obscure Sound wrote: "Passionate vocals join throughout the album with a straightforward arsenal of guitar, bass, piano, and drums, appealing to those enamored by roots, Americana, and country music."

Hounds of Mess Around was released in March 2024. The lead single, Not Reggae, reached #3 on the Digital Radio Tracker Independent chart and #30 on the Rock chart as of May 30, 2024.

Idiot Grin's sixth album, Golf Cart Life, was released on April 6, 2026.

== Discography ==
- Quarry (2010)
- Big Man (2015)
- State of Health (2017)
- Thoughts & Prayers (2020)
- Hounds of Mess Around (2024)
- Golf Cart Life (2026)
