= Room Service (The Oak Ridge Boys album) =

Studio album by Oak Ridge Boys
- Released: May 25, 1978
- Genre: Country
- Length: 34:30
- Label: ABC
- Producer: Ron Chancey

Oak Ridge Boys chronology
Y'all Come Back Saloon (1977)	Room Service (1978)	The Oak Ridge Boys Have Arrived (1979)

Singles from Room Service
- 1. "Cryin' Again" Released: September 2, 1978; 2. "Come On In" Released: December 1978

Room Service is the fourth album by The Oak Ridge Boys, released in 1978. It peaked at number three on the Billboard Top Country Albums chart. It includes the hits "I'll Be True to You", "Cryin' Again", and "Come On In". AllMusic gave it a professional rating of 4 stars out of 5.

== Track listing ==
No.	Title	Writer(s)	Length
1.	"If You Can't Find Love"	Peter McCann	2:58
2.	"But I Do"	Dave Parkinson, Troy Seals	3:30
3.	"Callin' Baton Rouge"	Dennis Linde	2:36
4.	"It Could Have Been Ten Years Ago"	Dennis Wilson	2:51
5.	"Lots of Matchbooks"	Harry Middlebrooks	3:07
6.	"If There Were Only Time For Love"	Wayne Moss	3:39
7.	"Cryin' Again"	Don Cook, Rafe Van Hoy	2:32
8.	"I'll Be True to You"	Alan Rhody	3:36
9.	"Come On In"	Michael Clark	2:58
10.	"Lay Down Your Sword and Shield"	Freddy Weller-Spooner Oldham	3:43
11.	"I Can Love You"	Garland Craft	3:00

== Personnel ==
The Oak Ridge Boys

- Duane Allen - lead
- Joe Bonsall - tenor
- William Lee Golden - baritone
- Richard Sterban - bass

Additional musicians

- James Burton, Jimmy Capps, Al Casey, Wayne Moss, Jerry Shook, Bobby Thompson, Chip Young - acoustic guitar
- Bobby Thompson - banjo
- Joe Osborn, Henry Strzelecki - bass guitar
- Lloyd Green - Dobro
- Hayward Bishop, Kenny Buttrey, Jerry Carrigan, John Guerin - drums
- James Burton, Billy Sanford, Pete Wade, Reggie Young - electric guitar
- Johnny Gimble, Tommy Williams - fiddle
- Charlie McCoy - harmonica
- David Briggs, Bobby Emmons, Randy Goodrum, John Hobbs, Ron Oates - keyboards
- Johnny Gimble - mandolin
- Farrell Morris - percussion
- Lloyd Green, Weldon Myrick - steel guitar
- Bergen White - string arrangements
