= Beautiful You (The Oak Ridge Boys song) =

Single by The Oak Ridge Boys

from the album Together
- B-side: "Ready to Take My Chances"
- Released: November 15, 1980
- Genre: Country
- Length: 4:08
- Label: MCA
- Songwriter: Dave Hanner
- Producer: Ron Chancey

The Oak Ridge Boys singles chronology
"Heart of Mine" (1980)	"Beautiful You" (1980)	"Elvira" (1981)

"Beautiful You" is a song written by Dave Hanner of Corbin/Hanner and recorded by The Oak Ridge Boys. It was released in November 1980 as the third single from Together. The song reached number 3 on the Billboard Hot Country Singles & Tracks chart.

== Chart performance ==
Chart (1980–1981)	Peak position
US Hot Country Songs (Billboard)	3
Canadian RPM Country Tracks	27
