= Gypsies on Parade =

Single by Sawyer Brown

from the album Out Goin' Cattin'
- B-side: "Not Ready to Let You Go"
- Released: December 17, 1986
- Genre: Country
- Length: 3:52
- Label: Capitol/Curb
- Songwriter(s): Mark Miller
- Producer(s): Randy Scruggs

Sawyer Brown singles chronology
"Out Goin' Cattin'" (1986)	"Gypsies on Parade" (1986)	"Savin' the Honey for the Honeymoon" (1987)

"Gypsies on Parade" is a song recorded by American country music group Sawyer Brown. It was released in December 1986 as the second single from the album Out Goin' Cattin'. The song reached #25 on the Billboard Hot Country Singles & Tracks chart. The song was written by Sawyer Brown's lead vocalist Mark Miller.

== Chart performance ==
Chart (1986–1987)	Peak position
US Hot Country Songs (Billboard)	25
Canadian RPM Country Tracks	23
