= Out Goin' Cattin' =

Studio album by Sawyer Brown
- Released: 1986
- Studio: Scruggs Sound (Berry Hill, Tennessee); Acorn Sound (Hendersonville, Tennessee)
- Genre: Country
- Length: 34:06
- Label: Capitol/Curb
- Producer: Randy Scruggs

Sawyer Brown chronology
Shakin' (1985)	Out Goin' Cattin' (1986)	Somewhere in the Night (1987)

Singles from Out Goin' Cattin'
- 1. "Out Goin' Cattin'" Released: September 8, 1986; 2. "Gypsies on Parade" Released: December 17, 1986

Out Goin' Cattin' is the third studio album by American country music band Sawyer Brown, released in 1986. Its title track, along with "Savin' the Honey for the Honeymoon" and "Gypsies on Parade", were all released as singles.

== Track listing ==
No.	Title	Writer(s)	Length
1.	"Lady of the Evening"	Mark Miller	3:43
2.	"Better Be Some Tears"	Kerry Chater, Bill LaBounty, Beckie Foster	3:33
3.	"Not Ready to Let You Go"	Steve Dorff, Miller	3:14
4.	"Out Goin' Cattin'" (featuring Cat Joe Bonsall)	Randy Scruggs, Miller	2:53
5.	"The House Won't Rock"	Frank J. Myers, Miller	2:55
6.	"New Shoes"	LaBounty, Foster, Susan Longacre	3:02
7.	"Graveyard Shift"	Gene Nelson, Paul Nelson	3:51
8.	"Night Rockin'"	Scruggs, Miller	3:56
9.	"Savin' the Honey for the Honeymoon"	Jeff Barry, Rick Vito	3:07
10.	"Gypsies on Parade"	Miller	3:52

== Personnel ==
Sawyer Brown

- Mark Miller – lead vocals
- Gregg Hubbard – keyboards, backing vocals
- Bobby Randall – guitars, backing vocals
- Jim Scholten – bass
- Joe Smyth – drums, percussion

Additional musicians

- John Barlow Jarvis – acoustic piano
- Shane Keister – synthesizers
- Gary Prim – keyboards
- Gene Sisk – keyboards
- Bill LaBounty – guitars
- Randy Scruggs – guitars
- Dennis Wilson – guitars
- Bob Wray – bass
- Jerry Kroon – drums
- Quitman Dennis – saxophones
- Jim Horn – saxophones
- Wayne Jackson – trombone, trumpet
- Mike Haynes – trumpet
- Cat Joe Bonsall – vocals (4)

== Production ==
- Randy Scruggs – producer
- Gene Eichelberger – engineer, remixing
- Ron "Snake" Reynolds – engineer
- Glenn Meadows – mastering at Masterfonics (Nashville, Tennessee)
- Roy Kohara – art direction
- Mark Shoolrey – design
- Dennis Keeley – photography, tinting

== Chart performance ==
Chart (1986)	Peak position
U.S. Billboard Top Country Albums	8
