= When Love Comes Callin' =

Single by Sawyer Brown

from the album Greatest Hits
- Released: October 6, 1990
- Genre: Country
- Length: 2:46
- Label: Capitol/Curb
- Songwriters: Mark Miller, Randy Scruggs
- Producers: Randy Scruggs, Mark Miller

Sawyer Brown singles chronology
"Puttin' the Dark Back into the Night" (1990)	"When Love Comes Callin'" (1990)	"One Less Pony" (1991)

"When Love Comes Callin'" is a song written by Mark Miller and Randy Scruggs, and recorded by American country music group Sawyer Brown. It was released in October 1990 as the first single from their Greatest Hits compilation album. The song reached #40 on the Billboard Hot Country Singles & Tracks chart.

== Chart performance ==
Chart (1990)	Peak position
Canada Country Singles (RPM)	18
US Hot Country Songs (Billboard)	40
