= The Boys Are Back (Sawyer Brown album) =

Studio album by Sawyer Brown
- Released: September 19, 1989
- Studio: Scruggs Sound (Berry Hill, Tennessee)
- Genre: Country
- Length: 38:24
- Label: Capitol/Curb
- Producer: Mark Miller; Randy Scruggs

Sawyer Brown chronology
Wide Open (1988)	The Boys Are Back (1989)	Greatest Hits (1990)

Singles from The Boys Are Back
- 1. "The Race Is On" Released: September 2, 1989; 2. "Did It for Love" Released: March 3, 1990; 3. "Puttin' the Dark Back into the Night" Released: May 26, 1990

The Boys Are Back is the sixth studio album released by the American country music band Sawyer Brown. Released in 1989 on Capitol Records, it features three singles: "The Race Is On" (a cover of a George Jones song), "I Did It for Love", and "Puttin' the Dark Back into the Night".

== Track listing ==
All tracks are written by Mark Miller, unless otherwise noted.

CD
No.	Title	Writer(s)	Length
1.	"Puttin' the Dark Back into the Night"		3:08
2.	"Rosie Knows"	Mark Miller, Gregg Hubbard	3:47
3.	"Did It for Love"		4:35
4.	"The Race Is On"	Don Rollins	2:53
5.	"Hey, Hey"	Jennifer Kimball, Ed Arkin	2:47
6.	"Good While It Lasted"	Don Cook, Bill LaBounty	2:56
7.	"Locomotive"		3:34
8.	"The Heartland"	Miller, Randy Scruggs	4:05
9.	"I'm Gonna Miss You After All"	Tony Haselden, Keith Worsham	3:19
10.	"Gettin' Tough (Good Ol' Boy)"	Steve Earle, Richard Bennett	4:01
11.	"Passing Train"	Hubbard	3:19
Total length:			38:24

== Personnel ==
Sawyer Brown

- Mark Miller – lead vocals, prempensua
- Gregg "Hobie" Hubbard – keyboards, backing vocals
- Bobby Randall – lead guitars, backing vocals
- Jim Scholten – bass
- Joe "Curley" Smyth – drums, percussion

Additional musicians

- John Barlow Jarvis – keyboards, acoustic piano
- Mike Lawler – synthesizers
- Steve Gibson – acoustic guitar, electric guitar
- Don Potter – acoustic guitar
- Randy Scruggs – guitars
- Eddie Bayers – drums, percussion
- Jerry Kroon – drums, percussion
- Terry McMillan – harmonica, percussion
- Mark O'Connor – fiddle
- Mac McAnally – vocal arrangements

== Production ==
- Mark Miller – producer
- Randy Scruggs – producer
- Ron "Snake" Reynolds – recording, mixing
- John Kliner – backing engineer
- Milan Bogdan – digital editing
- Glenn Meadows – mastering at Masterfonics (Nashville, Tennessee)
- Bonnie Rasmussen – art coordinator
- Bill Brunt Designs – art direction
- Greg Gorman – photography

== Charts ==
=== Weekly charts ===
Chart (1989)	Peak position
Canadian Albums (RPM)	85
US Top Country Albums (Billboard)	5

=== Year-end charts ===
Chart (1990)	Position
US Top Country Albums (Billboard)	9

== Certifications ==
Region	Certification	Certified units/sales
Canada (Music Canada)	Platinum	100,000^{^}
^{^} Shipments figures based on certification alone.
