= Did It for Love =

Single by Sawyer Brown

from the album The Boy Are Back
- B-side: "The Heartland"
- Released: March 3, 1990
- Genre: Country
- Length: 4:35
- Label: Capitol/Curb
- Songwriter(s): Mark Miller
- Producer(s): Randy Scruggs, Mark Miller

Sawyer Brown singles chronology
| "The Race Is On" (1989) | "Did It for Love" (1990) | "Puttin' the Dark Back into the Night" (1990) |

"Did It for Love" is a song recorded by American country music group Sawyer Brown. Written by lead vocalist Mark Miller, it was released in March 1990 as the second single from the album The Boys Are Back. The song reached #33 on the Billboard Hot Country Singles & Tracks chart.

== Chart performance ==
| Chart (1990) | Peak position |
|---|---|
| US Hot Country Songs (Billboard) | 33 |
| Canadian RPM Country Tracks | 23 |
