= I Don't Love You Anymore =

Single by Charlie Louvin

from the album Less and Less/I Don't Love You Anymore
- B-side: "Book of Memories"
- Released: May 1964
- Genre: Country
- Length: 2:30
- Label: Capitol
- Songwriter: Bill Anderson
- Producer: Marvin Hughes

Charlie Louvin singles chronology
"I Don't Love You Anymore" (1964)	"Less and Less" (1965)

"I Don't Love You Anymore" is a single by the American country music artist Charlie Louvin. Released in May 1964, it was the first single from his album Less and Less/I Don't Love You Anymore. In the US, it peaked at number 4 on the Billboard Hot Country Singles chart. It also reached number 1 on the RPM Country Tracks chart in Canada.

It was also covered by many other prominent country singers including Kitty Wells, Webb Pierce, Connie Smith, Norma Jean, George Jones and Carl Smith.

== Chart performance ==
Chart (1964)	Peak position
U.S. Billboard Hot Country Singles	4
Canadian RPM Country Tracks	1
