= Old Photographs =

Single by Sawyer Brown

from the album Somewhere in the Night
- B-side: "In This Town"
- Released: April 23, 1988
- Genre: Country
- Length: 2:54
- Label: Capitol/Curb
- Songwriters: Kix Brooks, Kenneth Beal, Bill McClelland
- Producer: Ron Chancey

Sawyer Brown singles chronology
"This Missin' You Heart of Mine" (1987)	"Old Photographs" (1988)	"My Baby's Gone" (1988)

"Old Photographs" is a song recorded by American country music group Sawyer Brown. It was released in April 1988 as the third single from the album Somewhere in the Night. The song reached #27 on the Billboard Hot Country Singles & Tracks chart. The song was written by Kix Brooks, Kenneth Beal and Bill McClelland.

== Chart performance ==
Chart (1988)	Peak position
US Hot Country Songs (Billboard)	27
Canadian RPM Country Tracks	35
