= Shakin' (Sawyer Brown song) =

Single by Sawyer Brown

from the album Shakin'
- B-side: "Billy Does Your Bulldog Bite"
- Released: May 5, 1986
- Genre: Country
- Length: 3:14
- Label: Capitol/Curb
- Songwriter(s): Mark Miller, Randy Scruggs
- Producer(s): Randy Scruggs, Mark Miller

Sawyer Brown singles chronology
"Heart Don't Fall Now" (1986)	"Shakin'" (1986)	"Out Goin' Cattin'" (1986)

"Shakin'" is a song written by Mark Miller and Randy Scruggs, and recorded by American country music group Sawyer Brown. It was released in May 1986 as the third single and title track from the album Shakin'. The song reached number 15 on the Billboard Hot Country Singles & Tracks chart.

== Music video ==
The music video was directed by Martin Kahan and premiered in mid-1986.

== Chart performance ==
Chart (1986)	Peak position
US Hot Country Songs (Billboard)	15
Canadian RPM Country Tracks	7
