= Y'all Come Back Saloon (song) =

Single by The Oak Ridge Boys

from the album Y'all Come Back Saloon
- B-side: "Emmylou"
- Released: July 16, 1977
- Genre: Country
- Length: 2:54
- Label: Dot
- Songwriter: Sharon Vaughn
- Producer: Ron Chancey

The Oak Ridge Boys singles chronology
"Family Reunion" (1976)	"Y'all Come Back Saloon" (1977)	"You're the One" (1977)

"Y'all Come Back Saloon" is a song written by Sharon Vaughn, and recorded by The Oak Ridge Boys. It was released in July 1977 as the first single and title track from Y'all Come Back Saloon, peaking at number 3 on the Billboard Hot Country Singles & Tracks chart.

== Charts ==
=== Weekly charts ===
Chart (1977)	Peak position
US Hot Country Songs (Billboard)	3
Canadian RPM Country Tracks	2

=== Year-end charts ===
Chart (1977)	Position
US Hot Country Songs (Billboard)	32
