= Dream On (The Righteous Brothers song) =

1974 single by The Righteous Brothers

Single by The Righteous Brothers

from the album Give It to the People
- B-side: "Dr. Rock and Roll"
- Released: November 1974
- Genre: Pop
- Length: 2:58
- Label: Capitol
- Songwriters: Dennis Lambert, Brian Potter
- Producers: Dennis Lambert, Brian Potter

The Righteous Brothers singles chronology
| "Give It to the People" (1974) | "Dream On" (1974) | "Never Say I Love You" (1975) |

"Dream On" is a song written by Dennis Lambert and Brian Potter. In 1974, The Righteous Brothers had a hit version, reaching No. 32 on the Billboard Hot 100, and No. 6 on the U.S. and Canadian Adult Contemporary charts. Bill Medley and Bobby Hatfield alternate lead vocals.

== Critical reception ==
Billboard described it as "a powerful ballad" that is "reminiscent in parts of some of the Righteous Brothers earlier Phil Spector material" and praised the vocal performance.

=== Chart performance ===
| Chart (1974) | Peak position |
|---|---|
| Australia (Kent Music Report) | 97 |
| Canada Top Singles (RPM) | 41 |
| US Adult Contemporary (Billboard) | 6 |
| US Billboard Hot 100 | 32 |

== The Oak Ridge Boys recording ==
"Dream On"

Single by The Oak Ridge Boys

from the album The Oak Ridge Boys Have Arrived
- B-side: "Sometimes the Rain Won't Let Me Sleep"
- Released: August 18, 1979
- Genre: Country
- Length: 3:16
- Label: MCA
- Songwriters: Dennis Lambert, Brian Potter
- Producer: Ron Chancey

The Oak Ridge Boys singles chronology
| "Rhythm Guitar" (1979) | "Dream On" (1979) | "Leaving Louisiana in the Broad Daylight" (1979) |

In 1979, the song was covered by The Oak Ridge Boys and was the second single from The Oak Ridge Boys Have Arrived. This is the only Oak Ridge Boys single to feature Richard Sterban as lead vocalist. It spent thirteen weeks within the top 40 Hot Country Songs charts and peaked at number seven. In Canada, the song spent three weeks at the number one position on the RPM Country Tracks chart, reaching that position on the November 3, 1979 chart and staying there for one week.

=== Chart performance ===
| Chart (1979) | Peak position |
|---|---|
| US Hot Country Songs (Billboard) | 7 |
| US Adult Contemporary (Billboard) | 45 |
| Canadian RPM Country Tracks | 1 |
| Canadian RPM Adult Contemporary | 23 |
