= Puttin' the Dark Back into the Night =

Single by Sawyer Brown

from the album The Boys Are Back
- Released: May 26, 1990
- Genre: Country
- Length: 3:08
- Label: Capitol/Curb
- Songwriter: Mark Miller
- Producers: Randy Scruggs, Mark Miller

Sawyer Brown singles chronology
"Did It for Love" (1990)	"Puttin' the Dark Back into the Night" (1990)	"When Love Comes Callin'" (1990)

"Puttin' the Dark Back into the Night" is a song written by Mark Miller, and recorded by American country music group Sawyer Brown. It was released in May 1990 as the third single from the album The Boys Are Back. The song reached #33 on the Billboard Hot Country Singles & Tracks chart.

== Chart performance ==
Chart (1990)	Peak position
Canada Country Singles (RPM)	19
US Hot Country Songs (Billboard)	33
