= Leroy Troy =

American banjo player (born 1966)

- Born: Troy Boswell; May 23, 1966 (age 60)
- Origin: Goodlettsville, Tennessee, U.S.
- Genres: Bluegrass; country rock; bro-country
- Occupation: Musician
- Instruments: Vocals; banjo
- Years active: 1988–present
- Labels: Bos Records, Rounder Records, Not On Label, Spring Fed

Troy Boswell (born May 23, 1966), known professionally as Leroy Troy, is an old-time banjo player from Goodlettsville, Tennessee. His banjo style is the clawhammer or frailing style, distinct from more commonly found Scruggs style in modern bluegrass banjo playing. He often performs humorous or comedy songs from the old-time music genre. Troy often uses a washboard with various sound-making devices affixed to it. The "Bicycle Wreck" song is often played by Troy on the washboard. His major musical influences are attributed to Uncle Dave Macon and others taught by him. Troy debuted on the Grand Ole Opry in 1988 and was the National Old-Time Banjo Champion in 1996.

Troy is known as "the Tennessee Slicker" and "the Sultan of Goodlettsville" and plays with the Tennessee Mafia Jugband and Marty Stuart; he appeared weekly on The Marty Stuart Show on RFD-TV.

== Discography ==
Solo

- Banjo Salute (Bos, 1985)
- Backroads (Bos, 1993)
- Son of the South (Bos, 1994)
- The Old Grey Mare (Rounder Select, 2001)

Terry Eldridge & Larry Perkins

- Three Fingers And A Clawhammer (Not On Label, 2008)

Tennessee Mafia Jug Band

- Poor Leroy's Almanack (Spring Fed, 2010)
- Barnyard Frolic (Spring Fed, 2011)
- Screams From The Holler (Spring Fed, 2012)
- Tales From Short Mountain (Spring Fed, 2013)
- Lester's Loafin Lounge (Not On Label, 2014)

Miscellaneous

- Suppertime Serenade (Bos, 2012)
