= My Baby's Gone (song) =

Single by Sawyer Brown

from the album Wide Open
- B-side: "Blue Denim Soul"
- Released: October 1, 1988
- Genre: Country
- Length: 3:28
- Label: Capitol/Curb
- Songwriter(s): Dennis Linde
- Producer(s): Ron Chancey

Sawyer Brown singles chronology
"Old Photographs" (1988)	"My Baby's Gone" (1988)	"Old Pair of Shoes" (1989)

"My Baby's Gone" is a song written by Dennis Linde, and originally recorded by American country music duo The Judds for their 1984 studio album Why Not Me.

American country music band Sawyer Brown released their version in October 1988, as the first single from the studio album Wide Open. The song reached number 11 on the Billboard Hot Country Singles chart.

== Chart performance ==
Chart (1988)	Peak position
US Hot Country Songs (Billboard)	11
Canadian RPM Country Tracks	5
