= You're the One (Glen Campbell song) =

Single by The Oak Ridge Boys

from the album Y'all Come Back Saloon
- B-side: "Morning Glory Do"
- Released: December 3, 1977
- Genre: Country
- Length: 2:59
- Label: ABC
- Songwriter: Bob Morrison
- Producer: Ron Chancey

The Oak Ridge Boys singles chronology
"Y'all Come Back Saloon" (1977)	"You're the One" (1977)	"I'll Be True to You" (1978)

"You're the One" is a song written by Bob Morrison, and recorded by The Oak Ridge Boys. It was released in December 1977 as the second single from Y'all Come Back Saloon, peaking at #2 on the Billboard Hot Country Singles & Tracks chart.

== Charts ==
=== Weekly charts ===
Chart (1977–1978)	Peak position
US Hot Country Songs (Billboard)	2
Canadian RPM Country Tracks	1

=== Year-end charts ===
Chart (1978)	Position
US Hot Country Songs (Billboard)	37

== Other versions ==
Glen Campbell originally recorded the song on his 1973 album I Knew Jesus (Before He Was a Star), which influenced the Oak Ridge Boys' rendition. The song was adapted twice—once by Hovie Lister and the Statesmen Quartet in 1974 with gospel-themed verses, and by the American Broadcasting Company in 1978 into their "We're The One" advertising campaign with a more 70's pop style, frequently featuring their network stars lip-syncing the song.
