= Come On In (The Oak Ridge Boys song) =

Single by The Oak Ridge Boys

from the album Room Service
- B-side: "Morning Glory Do"
- Released: December 1978
- Genre: Country
- Length: 2:58
- Label: ABC
- Songwriter: Michael Clark
- Producer: Ron Chancey

The Oak Ridge Boys singles chronology
"Cryin' Again" (1978)	"Come On In" (1978)	"Sail Away" (1979)

"Come On In" is a song written by Michael Clark, recorded by The Oak Ridge Boys. It was released in December 1978 as the third and final single from their album Room Service. The song spent fifteen weeks on the Hot Country Songs charts between December 1978 and early 1979, peaking at number three.

The song was also covered by Dave & Sugar, who included it on their 1978 Tear Time album under the title "Baby, Take Your Coat Off".

It is not to be confused with the Oak Ridge Boys' 1986 hit "Come On In (You Did the Best You Could Do)".

== Chart performance ==
Chart (1978–1979)	Peak position
US Hot Country Songs (Billboard)	3
Canadian RPM Country Tracks	3
