= Sail Away (Sam Neely song) =

Single by The Oak Ridge Boys

from the album The Oak Ridge Boys Have Arrived
- B-side: "The Only One"
- Released: April 7, 1979
- Genre: Country
- Length: 3:30
- Label: MCA
- Songwriter: Rafe Van Hoy
- Producer: Ron Chancey

The Oak Ridge Boys singles chronology
"Come On In" (1978)	"Sail Away" (1979)	"Rhythm Guitar" (1979)

"Sail Away" is a song written by Rafe Van Hoy, and first recorded by Sam Neely in 1977. The single peaked at number 98 on Hot Country Songs and 84 on the Billboard Hot 100. Kenny Rogers recorded it for Love or Something Like It.

It was then covered by The Oak Ridge Boys, and was the first single from The Oak Ridge Boys Have Arrived in April 1979. It spent thirteen weeks on the Hot Country Songs charts, peaking at number two. In Canada, the song spent three weeks in the number one position on the RPM Country Tracks chart, reaching that position on the June 2, 1979 chart. Rogers' version was singled in the United Kingdom and is included on The Kenny Rogers Singles Album.

== Charts ==
=== Weekly charts ===
Chart (1979)	Peak position
US Hot Country Songs (Billboard)	2
US Adult Contemporary (Billboard)	29
Canadian RPM Country Tracks	1
Canadian RPM Adult Contemporary	8

=== Year-end charts ===
Chart (1979)	Position
US Hot Country Songs (Billboard)	39
