= Leaving Louisiana in the Broad Daylight =

Single by The Oak Ridge Boys

from the album The Oak Ridge Boys Have Arrived
- B-side: "I Gotta Get Over This"
- Released: December 1, 1979
- Genre: Country
- Length: 2:59
- Label: MCA
- Songwriter(s): Rodney Crowell, Donivan Cowart
- Producer(s): Ron Chancey

The Oak Ridge Boys singles chronology
"Dream On" (1979)	"Leaving Louisiana in the Broad Daylight" (1979)	"Trying to Love Two Women" (1980)

"Leaving Louisiana in the Broad Daylight" is a song written by Rodney Crowell and Donivan Cowart. The song was initially covered by Emmylou Harris (in whose band Crowell had played during the late 1970s), who included it on her 1978 album Quarter Moon in a Ten Cent Town.

== The Oak Ridge Boys version ==
The Oak Ridge Boys released the song in December 1979 as the third single from their album The Oak Ridge Boys Have Arrived. "Leaving Louisiana in the Broad Daylight" was The Oak Ridge Boys' second number one country single, remaining at number one for a single week in February 1980, spending a total of eleven weeks on the chart.

== Chart performance ==
Chart (1979–1980)	Peak position
US Hot Country Songs (Billboard)	1
Canadian RPM Country Tracks	1
