= I'll Be True to You =

Single by The Oak Ridge Boys

from the album Y'all Come Back Saloon
- B-side: "An Old Time Family Bluegrass Band"
- Released: April 15, 1978
- Genre: Country
- Length: 3:40
- Label: Dot
- Songwriter: Alan Rhody
- Producer: Ron Chancey

The Oak Ridge Boys singles chronology
"You're the One" (1977)	"I'll Be True to You" (1978)	"Cryin' Again" (1978)

"I'll Be True to You" is a song written by Alan Rhody and recorded by The Oak Ridge Boys. It was released in April 1978 as the third single from Y'all Come Back Saloon and the first from the follow-up album Room Service. "I'll Be True to You" was the third Oak Ridge Boys' single to be a hit on the country chart and the first of their 17 number one hits. It stayed at number one for a week and spent a total of eleven weeks on the country chart.

== Chart performance ==
Chart (1978)	Peak position
US Hot Country Songs (Billboard)	1
US Bubbling Under Hot 100 (Billboard)	2
Canadian RPM Country Tracks	8
