= Out Goin' Cattin' (song) =

Single by Sawyer Brown with Cat Joe Bonsall

from the album Out Goin' Cattin'
- B-side: "The House Won't Rock"
- Released: September 8, 1986
- Genre: Country
- Length: 2:53
- Label: Capitol/Curb
- Songwriters: Randy Scruggs, Mark Miller
- Producer: Randy Scruggs

Sawyer Brown singles chronology
"Shakin'" (1986)	"Out Goin' Cattin'" (1986)	"Gypsies on Parade" (1986)

"Out Goin' Cattin'" is a song written by Mark Miller and Randy Scruggs and released by American country music group Sawyer Brown. It features guest vocals from Joe Bonsall (credited as Cat Joe Bonsall) of the Oak Ridge Boys. The song was released in September 1986 as the lead-off single and title tracks to Sawyer Brown's third album Out Goin' Cattin'. It peaked at number 11 on the Billboard Hot Country Songs chart and number 4 the Canadian RPM country singles chart.

== Music video ==
The music video was directed by Martin Kahan and premiered in September 1986.

== Chart performance ==
Chart (1986)	Peak position
US Hot Country Songs (Billboard)	11
Canadian RPM Country Tracks	4
