= Somewhere in the Night (The Oak Ridge Boys song) =

Single by Sawyer Brown

from the album Somewhere in the Night
- B-side: "My Baby Drives a Buick"
- Released: August 22, 1987
- Genre: Country
- Length: 3:20
- Label: Capitol/Curb
- Songwriters: Rafe Van Hoy, Don Cook
- Producer: Ron Chancey

Sawyer Brown singles chronology
| "Savin' the Honey for the Honeymoon" (1987) | "Somewhere in the Night" (1987) | "This Missin' You Heart of Mine" (1987) |

"Somewhere in the Night" is a song originally recorded by The Oak Ridge Boys on their 1981 album Fancy Free. The song was later recorded by American country music group Sawyer Brown. It was released in August 1987 as the first single and title track from the album Somewhere in the Night. The song reached #29 on the Billboard Hot Country Singles & Tracks chart. The song was written by Rafe Van Hoy and Don Cook.

== Chart performance ==
| Chart (1987) | Peak position |
|---|---|
| US Hot Country Songs (Billboard) | 29 |
| Canadian RPM Country Tracks | 26 |
