= Heart Don't Fall Now =

Single by Sawyer Brown

from the album Shakin'
- B-side: "That's a No No"
- Released: February 1, 1986
- Genre: Country
- Length: 3:22
- Label: Capitol/Curb
- Songwriter(s): Carolyn Swilley, Bill LaBounty, Beckie Foster
- Producer(s): Randy Scruggs

Sawyer Brown singles chronology
"Betty's Bein' Bad" (1985)	"Heart Don't Fall Now" (1986)	"Shakin'" (1986)

"Heart Don't Fall Now" is a song written by Carolyn Swilley, Bill LaBounty and Beckie Foster, and recorded by American country music group Sawyer Brown. It was released in February 1986 as the second single from the album Shakin'. The song reached #14 on the Billboard Hot Country Singles & Tracks chart.

== Chart performance ==
Chart (1986)	Peak position
US Hot Country Songs (Billboard)	14
Canadian RPM Country Tracks	16
