= Trying to Love Two Women =

Single by The Oak Ridge Boys

from the album Together
- B-side: "Hold On Til Sunday"
- Released: April 19, 1980
- Genre: Country
- Length: 2:30
- Label: MCA
- Songwriter: Sonny Throckmorton
- Producer: Ron Chancey

The Oak Ridge Boys singles chronology
"Leaving Louisiana in the Broad Daylight" (1979)	"Trying to Love Two Women" (1980)	"Heart of Mine" (1980)

"Trying to Love Two Women" is a song written by Sonny Throckmorton, and recorded by The Oak Ridge Boys. It was released in April 1980 as the first single from Together. It was The Oak Ridge Boys' third number one hit on the Billboard country chart. The single stayed at number one for a week and spent a total of twelve weeks on the chart.

== Chart performance ==
Chart (1980)	Peak position
US Hot Country Songs (Billboard)	1
Canadian RPM Country Tracks	1

=== Year-end charts ===
Chart (1980)	Position
US Country Songs (Billboard)	11
