= Cryin' Again =

Single by The Oak Ridge Boys

from the album Room Service
- B-side: "I Can Love You"
- Released: September 2, 1978
- Genre: Country
- Length: 2:34
- Label: ABC
- Songwriters: Rafe Van Hoy, Don Cook
- Producer: Ron Chancey

The Oak Ridge Boys singles chronology
| "I'll Be True to You" (1978) | "Cryin' Again" (1978) | "Come On In" (1978) |

"Cryin' Again" is a song written by Rafe Van Hoy and Don Cook, and recorded by The Oak Ridge Boys. It was released in September 1978 as the second single from Room Service. The song reached number 3 on the Billboard Hot Country Singles & Tracks chart.

== Chart performance ==
| Chart (1978) | Peak position |
|---|---|
| US Hot Country Songs (Billboard) | 3 |
| US Bubbling Under Hot 100 (Billboard) | 7 |
| Canadian RPM Country Tracks | 1 |
