= Heart of Mine (The Oak Ridge Boys song) =

Single by The Oak Ridge Boys

from the album Together
- B-side: "Love Takes Two"
- Released: July 19, 1980
- Genre: Country
- Length: 3:30
- Label: MCA
- Songwriter: Michael Foster
- Producer: Ron Chancey

The Oak Ridge Boys singles chronology
"Trying to Love Two Women" (1980)	"Heart of Mine" (1980)	"Beautiful You" (1980)

"Heart of Mine" is a song written by Michael Foster, and recorded by The Oak Ridge Boys. It was released in July 1980 as the second single from Together. The song reached number 3 on the Billboard Hot Country Singles & Tracks chart.

== Chart performance ==
Chart (1980)	Peak position
US Hot Country Songs (Billboard)	3
US Bubbling Under Hot 100 (Billboard)	5
US Adult Contemporary (Billboard)	49
Canadian RPM Country Tracks	3
