= Rachel Brooke =

American country musician

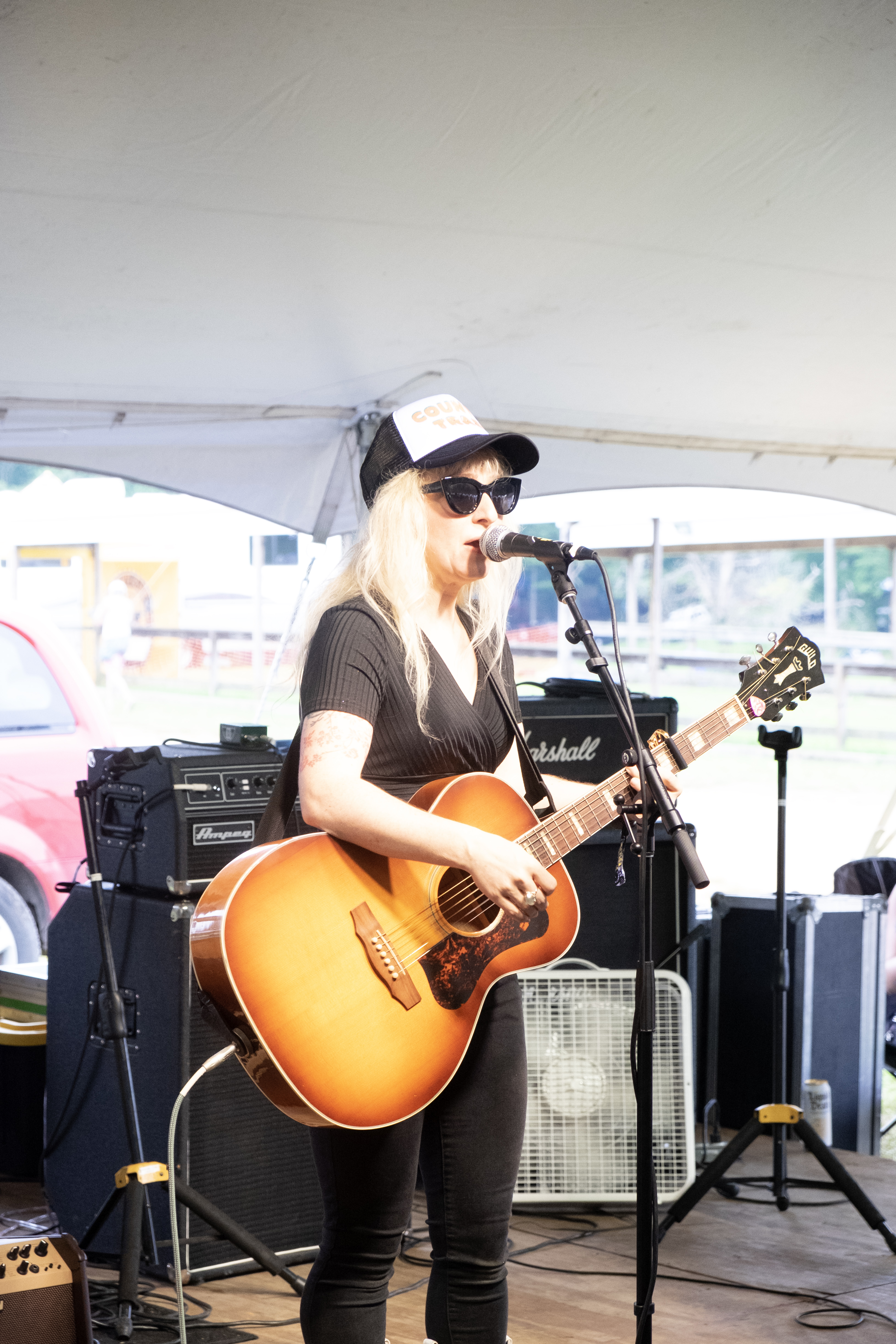
- Brooke performing at Muddy Roots, August 2021

Background information
- Origin: Michigan
- Genres: Country
- Years active: 2008–present

Rachel Brooke is an American country musician. Since 2008 she has released five full-length records, two collaboration records with Lonesome Wyatt of Those Poor Bastards several EPs and other side projects. She is considered a key member of the underground country movement of the early 21st century, with sounds rooted in traditional Americana rather than modern corporate Nashville country music.

== Early life ==
Brooke grew up in Lovells, Michigan. She was largely influenced by her father Barry Van Guilder, a banjo player and guitarist who introduced her to several genres and music and eventually brought her to perform with him at a country fair.

== Career ==
Prior to her solo career, Brooke spent her teenage years playing in an all-girl punk band.

Brooke's first two records, A Killer's Dream (2008) and Down at the Barnyard (2010) both had a sound rooted in country bluegrass and gothic blues. Her next two efforts, A Killer's Dream (2012) and The Loneliness In Me (2020) incorporated more elements of blues and jazz, while still retaining the classic sound from her earlier records.

She has performed at many festivals including Muddy Roots, South by Southwest, the Americana Music Festival & Conference and the Rochester International Jazz Festival.

== Discography ==
Studio albums

- Rachel Brooke (2008)
- Down In The Barnyard (2011)
- A Killer's Dream (2012)
- The Loneliness in Me (2020)
- This One's For You (2026)

Collaborative albums

- A Bitter Harvest (with Lonesome Wyatt) (2009)
- Bad Omen (2015)

Appears on

- Misanthrope Family Album (Modern Mal) (2017)

EPs

- Junk (2009)
- Late Night Lover (2012)
- Sinner Man / Mystery of Death (split EP with Exene, Sean & Zander) (2013)
- The World's Greatest Anchor (2016)
