= This Missin' You Heart of Mine =

Single by Sawyer Brown

from the album Somewhere in the Night
- B-side: "A Mighty Big Boom"
- Released: November 23, 1987
- Genre: Country
- Length: 2:40
- Label: Capitol/Curb
- Songwriters: Mike Geiger, Woody Mullis
- Producer: Ron Chancey

Sawyer Brown singles chronology
"Somewhere in the Night" (1987)	"This Missin' You Heart of Mine" (1987)	"Old Photographs" (1988)

"This Missin' You Heart of Mine" is a song written by Mike Geiger and Woody Mullis, and recorded by American country music group Sawyer Brown. It was released in November 1987 as the second single from the album Somewhere in the Night. The song reached No. 2 on the Billboard Hot Country Singles & Tracks chart.

== Charts ==
=== Weekly charts ===
Chart (1987–1988)	Peak position
US Hot Country Songs (Billboard)	2
Canadian RPM Country Tracks	1

=== Year-end charts ===
Chart (1988)	Position
Canadian RPM Country Tracks	9
US Hot Country Songs (Billboard)	36
