= Wide Open (Sawyer Brown album) =

Studio album by Sawyer Brown
- Released: October 4, 1988
- Studio: New River Studios (Fort Lauderdale, Florida); The Music Mill, Eleven Eleven Studios and Woodland Studios (Nashville, Tennessee).
- Genre: Country
- Length: 36:58
- Label: Capitol/Curb
- Producer: Ron Chancey

Sawyer Brown chronology
| Somewhere in the Night (1987) | Wide Open (1988) | The Boys Are Back (1989) |

Singles from Wide Open
- 1. "My Baby's Gone" Released: October 1, 1988

Wide Open is the fifth studio album by American country music band Sawyer Brown. It was released in June 1988 on Capitol Records, and features the singles "My Baby's Gone", "It Wasn't His Child", and "Old Pair of Shoes". The title track was co-written by Alan LeBoeuf, one-third of Baillie & the Boys.

== Track listing ==
| No. | Title | Writer(s) | Length |
|---|---|---|---|
| 1. | "My Baby's Gone" | Dennis Linde | 3:28 |
| 2. | "Old Pair of Shoes" | Mark Miller | 2:45 |
| 3. | "What Am I Going to Tell My Heart" | Gregg Hubbard, Bobby Randall | 3:44 |
| 4. | "Blue Denim Soul" | Miller | 3:52 |
| 5. | "It Wasn't His Child" | Skip Ewing | 3:38 |
| 6. | "Wide Open" | Beckie Foster, Bill LaBounty, Alan LeBoeuf | 4:06 |
| 7. | "Falling Apart at the Heart" | Hubbard, Miller | 4:00 |
| 8. | "Axe to Grind" | Miller | 3:10 |
| 9. | "Running Out of Reasons to Run" | Jim Rushing, J. D. Martin | 3:38 |
| 10. | "Field Hand" | Miller | 4:37 |

== Personnel ==
Sawyer Brown

- Mark Miller – lead vocals
- Gregg "Hobie" Hubbard – keyboards, backing vocals
- Bobby Randall – electric guitar, backing vocals
- Jim Scholten – bass
- Joe "Curley" Smyth – drums, percussion

Additional musicians

- David Briggs – keyboards
- Mark Casstevens – acoustic guitar
- Brent Rowan – guitars
- Sonny Garrish – steel guitar
- Jack Williams – bass
- Jerry Kroon – drums, percussion
- Terry McMillan – harmonica
- Buddy Spicher – fiddle
- The Jordanaires – backing vocals (1)
- Beckie Foster – backing vocals
- Beverly Randall – backing vocals

== Production ==
- Ron Chancey – producer
- Blake Chancey – recording
- Joe Scaife – recording
- Billy Sherrill – recording
- Hoot Borden – traffic engineer
- John Abbott – assistant engineer
- Paul Goldberg – assistant engineer
- Rodney Good – assistant engineer
- Greg Parker – assistant engineer
- John Port – assistant engineer
- Denny Purcell – mastering at Georgetown Masters (Nashville, Tennessee)
- Virginia Team – art direction, design
- Jerry Joyner – design
- Mark Tucker – photography

== Chart performance ==
| Chart (1988) | Peak position |
|---|---|
| U.S. Billboard Top Country Albums | 33 |
