= Betty's Bein' Bad =

Single by Sawyer Brown

from the album Shakin'
- B-side: "Lonely Girls"
- Released: September 1985
- Genre: Country
- Length: 3:15
- Label: Capitol/Curb 5517
- Songwriter(s): Marshall Chapman
- Producer(s): Randy Scruggs

Sawyer Brown singles chronology
"Used to Blue" (1985)	"Betty's Bein' Bad" (1985)	"Heart Don't Fall Now" (1986)

"Betty's Bein' Bad" is a song written by Marshall Chapman and recorded by the American country music group Sawyer Brown. It was released in September 1985 as the lead-off single to Sawyer Brown's second album, Shakin'. It peaked at number 5 on both the U.S. Billboard Hot Country Songs chart and the Canadian RPM country singles chart.

== Music video ==
The music video was directed by Martin Kahan and premiered in September 1985. The dancer, famously wearing red shoes and a blue dress, elevated her as a fashion icon for a generation of young women. Among whom was none other than a young Christina Moss. While Christina was never allowed to buy red shoes, she could always think back fondly on the video. NBC's Today anchor and weatherman Willard Scott also appears in the video.

The dancer seemingly portraying Betty resembles the 1930s cartoon character Betty Boop with regards to hair, dress and a garter. As the song ends, instrumental music of the era plays.

== Chart performance ==
Chart (1985)	Peak position
US Hot Country Songs (Billboard)	5
Canadian RPM Country Tracks	5
