= Somewhere in the Night (Sawyer Brown album) =

Studio album by Sawyer Brown
- Released: August 12,1987
- Recorded: Muscle Shoals (Sheffield, Alabama); Eleven Eleven (Nashville, Tennessee); Woodland (Nashville, Tennessee)
- Genre: Country
- Length: 32:43
- Label: Capitol/Curb
- Producer: Ron Chancey

Sawyer Brown chronology
| Out Goin' Cattin' (1986) | Somewhere in the Night (1987) | Wide Open (1988) |

Singles from Somewhere in the Night
- 1. "Somewhere in the Night" Released: August 22, 1987; 2. "This Missin' You Heart of Mine" Released: November 23, 1987; 3. "Old Photographs" Released: April 23, 1988

Somewhere in the Night is the fourth studio album by American country music band Sawyer Brown. Its title track was a single, as were "This Missin' You Heart of Mine" and "Old Photographs". All three singles charted on the Hot Country Singles charts. The title track, which is not related to Barry Manilow's hit song, was previously recorded by The Oak Ridge Boys on their 1981 album, Fancy Free. "Lola's Love" would later be covered by Ricky Van Shelton on his album Love and Honor and released as a single in 1994.

== Track listing ==
| No. | Title | Writer(s) | Length |
|---|---|---|---|
| 1. | "Somewhere in the Night" | Don Cook, Rafe Van Hoy | 3:20 |
| 2. | "Little Red Caboose" | Steve Gibson, Dave Loggins | 4:07 |
| 3. | "This Missin' You Heart of Mine" | Woody Mullis, Mike Geiger | 2:40 |
| 4. | "Dr. Rock N. Roll" | Dennis Linde | 3:12 |
| 5. | "Still Hold On" | Kim Carnes, Eric Kaz, Wendy Waldman, Dave Ellingson | 3:42 |
| 6. | "Lola's Love" | Linde | 3:55 |
| 7. | "In This Town" | Tom Shapiro, Michael Garvin | 3:04 |
| 8. | "A Mighty Big Broom" | Mark Miller | 2:52 |
| 9. | "Still Life in Blue" | Linde | 2:49 |
| 10. | "Old Photographs" | Kenneth Beal, Kix Brooks, Bill McClelland | 2:54 |

== Personnel ==
As listed in liner notes.

Sawyer Brown

- Mark Miller – lead vocals
- Gregg Hubbard – keyboards, vocals
- Bobby Randall – lead guitars, vocals
- Jim Scholten – bass, vocals
- Joe Smyth – drums, vocals

Additional musicians

- David Briggs – keyboards
- Steve Nathan – keyboards
- Jimmy Johnson – electric guitar
- Mac McAnally – acoustic guitar
- Brent Rowan – lead guitars, acoustic guitar, dobro
- David Hood – bass
- Roger Hawkins – drums
- Terry McMillan – harmonica, percussion
- Jim Horn – saxophones
- Andrew Love – saxophones
- Jack Hale – trombone
- Wayne Jackson – trumpet

== Production ==
- Ron Chancey – producer
- Les Ladd – recording, mixing
- John Abbott – assistant engineer
- Pete Greene – assistant engineer
- Greg Parker – assistant engineer
- Todd Sholar – assistant engineer
- Carlos Grier – mastering
- Denny Purcell – mastering
- Norma Jean Owen – album coordinator
- Virginia Team – art direction, design
- Jerry Joyner – logo design
- Empire Studio – photography
- Mixed at Sound Emporium (Nashville, Tennessee)
- Mastered at Georgetown Masters (Nashville, Tennessee).

== Chart performance ==
| Chart (1987) | Peak position |
|---|---|
| U.S. Billboard Top Country Albums | 16 |

== References and external links ==
- Somewhere in the Night at Allmusic
