= Marshall Chapman =

American singer-songwriter and author (born 1949)

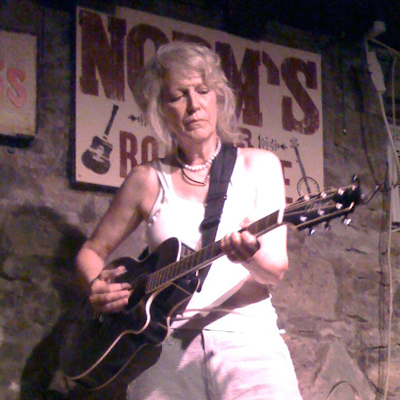
- Chapman performing in Nashville (2009)

Background information
- Born: January 7, 1949 (age 77); Spartanburg, South Carolina, United States
- Genres: Country; Rock
- Occupations: Singer-songwriter, author, actress
- Instrument: Guitar
- Years active: 1970s–present
- Website: Tallgirl.com

Marshall Chapman (born January 7, 1949) is an American singer-songwriter and author.

== Biography ==
=== Early life ===
Marshall Chapman was born in Spartanburg, South Carolina, United States. She was the daughter of a cotton mill owner. After she attended a concert by Elvis Presley in 1956, she became interested in rock and roll. She was educated at Salem Academy in Winston-Salem, North Carolina. She then graduated from Vanderbilt University in Nashville, Tennessee in 1971.

=== Career ===
She embarked upon a music career in the 1970s. Her songs have been recorded by such diverse artists as Conway Twitty, Joe Cocker, Jimmy Buffett, Emmylou Harris, Wynonna, Jessi Colter, John Hiatt, Dion, Olivia Newton-John, Irma Thomas, Rattlesnake Annie and Ronnie Milsap. Her song "Betty's Bein' Bad" was a hit for Sawyer Brown.

Her 1978 album, Jaded Virgin (Epic), was voted Record of the Year by Stereo Review. In 1998, Marshall and Matraca Berg contributed 14 songs to Good Ol' Girls, a country musical based on the stories of Lee Smith and Jill McCorkle. The musical continues to play theaters throughout the South.

She has written two books. Her memoir, Goodbye, Little Rock and Roller, was published in 2003 by St. Martin's Press. Her second book, They Came to Nashville, was published in 2010 by Vanderbilt University Press – Country Music Foundation Press. It is a 2010 Fall Okra Pick of the Southern Independent Booksellers Association.

== Discography ==
- Me, I'm Feelin' Free – Epic/CBS – 1977
- Jaded Virgin – Epic/CBS – 1978
- Marshall – Epic – 1979
- Take It On Home – Rounder – 1982
- Dirty Linen – Tall Girl – 1987
- Inside Job – Tall Girl – 1991
- It's About Time… – Tallgirl/Island/Margaritaville – 1995
- Love Slave – Tallgirl/Island/Margaritaville – 1996
- Goodbye, Little Rock And Roller – Tall Girl – 2003
- Live! The Bitter End – Tall Girl – 2004
- Mellowicious! – Thirty Tigers/Tallgirl – 2006
- Big Lonesome – Tall Girl – 2011
- Blaze Of Glory – Tall Girl – 2013
- Songs I Can't Live Without – Tall Girl – 2020
