= The Louvin Brothers =

American country music duo

Louvin Brothers
- Charlie (left) and Ira Louvin

Background information
- Origin: Henagar, Alabama, US
- Genres: Country; bluegrass; gospel
- Years active: 1940–1963
- Label: Capitol
- Members: Ira Louvin; Charlie Louvin

The Louvin Brothers were an American musical duo composed of brothers Ira and Charlie Louvin (né Loudermilk).

The brothers wrote and performed country, bluegrass, and gospel music. Ira played mandolin and generally sang lead vocal in the tenor range, while Charlie played rhythm guitar and offered supporting vocals in a lower pitch. They helped popularize the vocal technique of close harmony in country and country-rock.

After becoming regulars at the Grand Ole Opry and scoring a string of hit singles in the late 1950s and early '60s, the Louvin Brothers broke up in 1963 due in large part to Charlie growing tired of Ira's addictions and reckless behavior. Ira died in a traffic accident in 1965. They were inducted into the Country Music Hall of Fame in 2001, and Charlie died of cancer in 2011. Rolling Stone ranked the Louvin Brothers number four on its list of the 20 Greatest Duos of All Time.

== Background ==
Brothers Ira (April 21, 1924 – June 20, 1965) and Charlie (July 7, 1927 – January 26, 2011) Louvin (né Loudermilk) adopted the name Louvin Brothers in the 1940s as they began their career in gospel music. They grew up listening to and singing shape note music, which influenced the rest of their musical output. Their first foray into secular music was the minor hit "The Get Acquainted Waltz", recorded with Chet Atkins. Their other hits include "Cash on the Barrelhead" and "When I Stop Dreaming". They joined the Grand Ole Opry in 1955 and stayed there until breaking up in 1963. The brothers are cousins to songwriter John D. Loudermilk.

Their songs were heavily influenced by their Baptist faith and often included hymns or original songs that promoted principles in line with their religious upbringing. Nevertheless, Ira Louvin was notorious for his drinking, womanizing, and volcanic temper. He was married four times; his third wife Faye shot him four times in the chest and twice in the hand after he allegedly tried to strangle her with a telephone cord. Although seriously injured, he survived. When performing and drinking, Ira would sometimes become angry enough on stage to smash his mandolin when he was unable to tune it, and – when sober – glue it back together. His style was heavily influenced by Bill Monroe, and his brother Charlie Monroe, who had a tempestuous relationship with Ira, considered him one of the top mandolin players in Nashville.

In his New York Times review of Charlie's biography Satan Is Real, Alex Abramovich said, "Ira Louvin was a full head taller than his younger brother, played the mandolin like Bill Monroe, and sang in an impossibly high, tense, quivering tenor. Charlie strummed a guitar, grinned like a vaudevillian, and handled the bottom register. But every so often, in the middle of a song, some hidden signal flashed and the brothers switched places – with Ira swooping down from the heights, and Charlie angling upward – and even the most careful listeners would lose track of which man was carrying the lead. This was more than close-harmony singing; each instance was an act of transubstantiation." (Note: In musical analysis this technique is called voice exchange.)

In 1963, fed up with Ira's drinking and abusive behavior, Charlie started a solo career, and Ira also went on his own.

Ira died on June 20, 1965, at the age of 41. His fourth wife, Anne Young, and he were on the way home from a performance in Kansas City when they came to a section of construction on Highway 70 outside of Williamsburg, Missouri, where traffic had been reduced down to one lane. A drunken driver struck their car head-on, and both Ira and Anne were killed.

Charlie died of pancreatic cancer on January 26, 2011, at age 83.

== Legacy ==
Country-rock band The Byrds recorded the Louvin-penned "The Christian Life" for their 1968 release Sweetheart of the Rodeo.

Emmylou Harris had a hit with the brothers' tune "If I Could Only Win Your Love" in 1975. Her cover version reached number four on the Billboard Hot Country Singles chart and earned the top spot on the RPM Country Tracks chart in Canada.

In 2001, the Louvin Brothers were inducted into the Country Music Hall of Fame. The tribute CD Livin', Lovin', Losin': Songs of the Louvin Brothers, produced by Carl Jackson and Kathy Louvin and released in 2003, won the 2004 Grammy Award for Best Country Album.

=== Satan Is Real album ===
Satan Is Real album cover

Although the brothers are still remembered today for their musical talent, they are also remembered for the unusual cover used for their 1959 album, Satan Is Real. Designed by Ira Louvin, the cover features the brothers standing in a rock quarry in front of a 12-foot-tall (3.7 m) plywood rendition of the Devil as several hidden tires soaked in kerosene burn behind them as fire and brimstone. Some reviewers count this as being one of the "greatest iconic album covers of all time."

The opening bars of the album's title track "Satan Is Real" can be heard at the beginning of Hank Williams III's "Medley: Straight to Hell / Satan Is Real", on his Straight to Hell album of 2006. It is also excerpted in Will Ferrell's 2009 one-man Broadway show, You're Welcome America. A Final Night With George W Bush.

== Partial discography ==
- 1956: The Louvin Brothers (MGM)
- 1956: Tragic Songs of Life (Capitol)
- 1957: Nearer My God to Thee (Capitol)
- 1958: Ira and Charlie (Capitol)
- 1958: The Family Who Prays (Capitol)
- 1958: Country Love Ballads (Capitol)
- 1959: Satan Is Real (Capitol)
- 1960: My Baby's Gone (Capitol)
- 1960: A Tribute to the Delmore Brothers (Capitol)
- 1961: Encore (Capitol)
- 1961: Christmas with the Louvin Brothers (Capitol)
- 1962: The Weapon of Prayer (Capitol)
- 1963: Keep Your Eyes on Jesus (Capitol)
- 1964: The Louvin Brothers Sing and Play Their Current Hits (Capitol)
- 1965: Thank God for My Christian Home (Capitol)
- 1966: Ira and Charles (Hilltop)
- 1967: Two Different Worlds (Capitol)
- 1967: The Great Roy Acuff Songs (Capitol)
- 1968: Country Heart and Soul (Capitol)
- 1973: The Great Gospel Singing of The Louvin Brothers (Capitol)
- 1975: Live at New River Ranch (Copper Creek)
- 1976: I Don't Believe You Met My Baby (Hilltop)
- 1978: Songs That Tell a Story (Rounder)
- 1990: Early MGM Recordings (Rounder)
- 1992: Close Harmony (Bear Family Records)
- 1995: Greatest Hits (Capitol)
- 1995: When I Stop Dreaming: The Best of the Louvin Brothers (Razor & Tie)
- 2006: The Essential Louvin Brothers 1955–1964: My Baby's Gone (Raven)

== Charted singles ==
Year	Single	Chart Positions
Year	Single	US Country
1955	"When I Stop Dreaming"	8
1956	"I Don't Believe You've Met My Baby"	1
1956	"Hoping That You're Hoping"	7
1956	"You're Running Wild"	7
1956	"Cash on the Barrelhead"^{A}	7
1957	"Don't Laugh"	11
1957	"Plenty of Everything but You"	14
1958	"My Baby's Gone"	9
1959	" Knoxville Girl"	19
1961	"I Love You Best of All"	12
1961	"How's the World Treating You"	26
1962	"Must You Throw Dirt in My Face"	21

- ^{A}B-side to "You're Running Wild".
