= Richard Sterban =

American quartet bass singer (1943–2026)

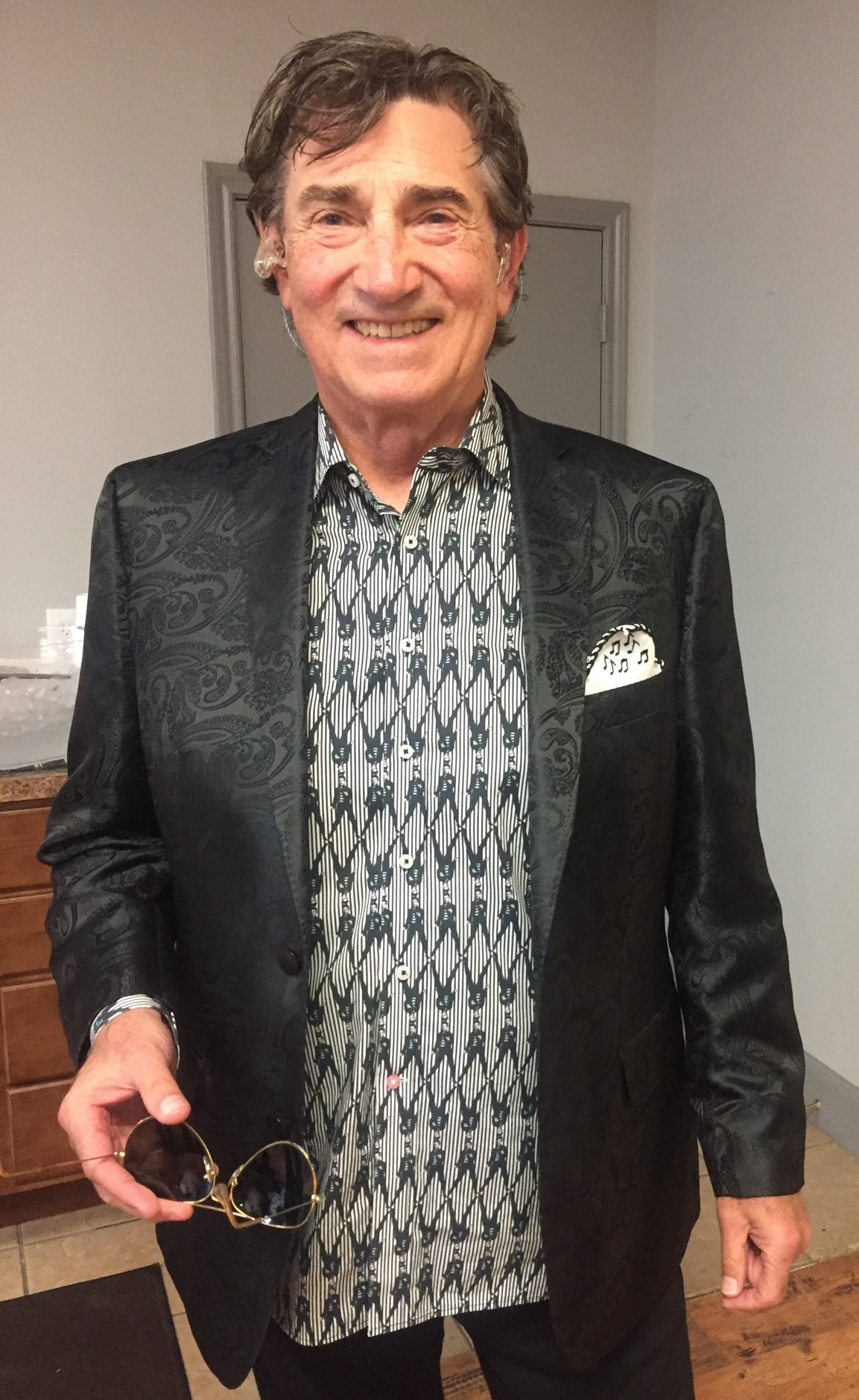
- Sterban in 2019

Background information
- Born: Richard Anthony Sterban; April 24, 1943; Camden, New Jersey, U.S.
- Died: November 14, 2026 (aged 83) Hendersonville, Tennessee, U.S.
- Genres: Country; pop; gospel
- Occupation: Bass singer
- Years active: 1962–2026
- Formerly of: The Keystones; The Oak Ridge Boys
- Website: Oak Ridge Boys website (as of June 27, 2026)

Richard Anthony Sterban (April 24, 1943 – November 14, 2026) was an American singer. In 1972, he joined the country and gospel quartet the Oak Ridge Boys, in which he sang bass.

Sterban was inducted into the Country Music Hall of Fame in 2015 as a member of the Oak Ridge Boys.

== Background ==
Born in Camden, New Jersey, Sterban grew up in Collingswood, New Jersey. After graduating from Collingswood High School, Sterban attended Trenton State College (now The College of New Jersey).

== Career ==
Prior to joining the Oak Ridge Boys, Sterban was a founding member of the Keystones, a gospel quartet based in the northeastern United States, and later toured with J. D. Sumner and the Stamps Quartet backing Elvis Presley, including appearing in the fîlm Elvis On Tour. Sterban is best known for his "oom-papa-oom-papa-mow-mow" bass solo in the Oak Ridge Boys' 1981 single "Elvira" and his lead vocal on a cover of the Righteous Brothers' hit "Dream On", which made the top ten.

Sterban recorded public service announcements for NOAA Weather Radio. He served as the voice of The Roadhouse, the classic country Sirius Satellite Radio channel. Sterban was a minority owner of the Nashville Sounds minor league baseball team from 1978 to 2008.

During his later years, Sterban had prolonged absences from the Oak Ridge Boys' tours. Therein, Aaron McCune, the bass vocalist for Dailey & Vincent, served as his fill-in. Sterban again took leave following their appearance at the 60th Academy of Country Music Awards on May 8, 2025; he announced in September that this was due to treatment for pancreatic cancer. On occasion, Tim Duncan also replaced him on tour. Sterban made his first appearances with the band since his diagnosis during its Grand Ole Opry appearances on January 30 and 31, 2026, and noted that he hoped to resume touring later in the year since he still felt well enough to perform.

== Personal life and death ==
Sterban's first marriage to Sandra Wilson ended in divorce. He later married Donna Summers. He had three sons from his first marriage and two daughters from his second marriage. He also had nine grandchildren and three great-grandchildren. He resided in Hendersonville, Tennessee for more than five decades.

Sterban sold men's wear in a Gimbels department store prior to joining the Oak Ridge Boys, and became noted for his well-dressed appearances on stage. He was also a devout Christian and very open about his faith.

Sterban died from complications of bronchitis and pneumonia after a long battle with pancreatic cancer in Hendersonville, Tennessee, on November 14, 2026, at the age of 83.
