= Joe Bonsall =

American singer (1948–2024)

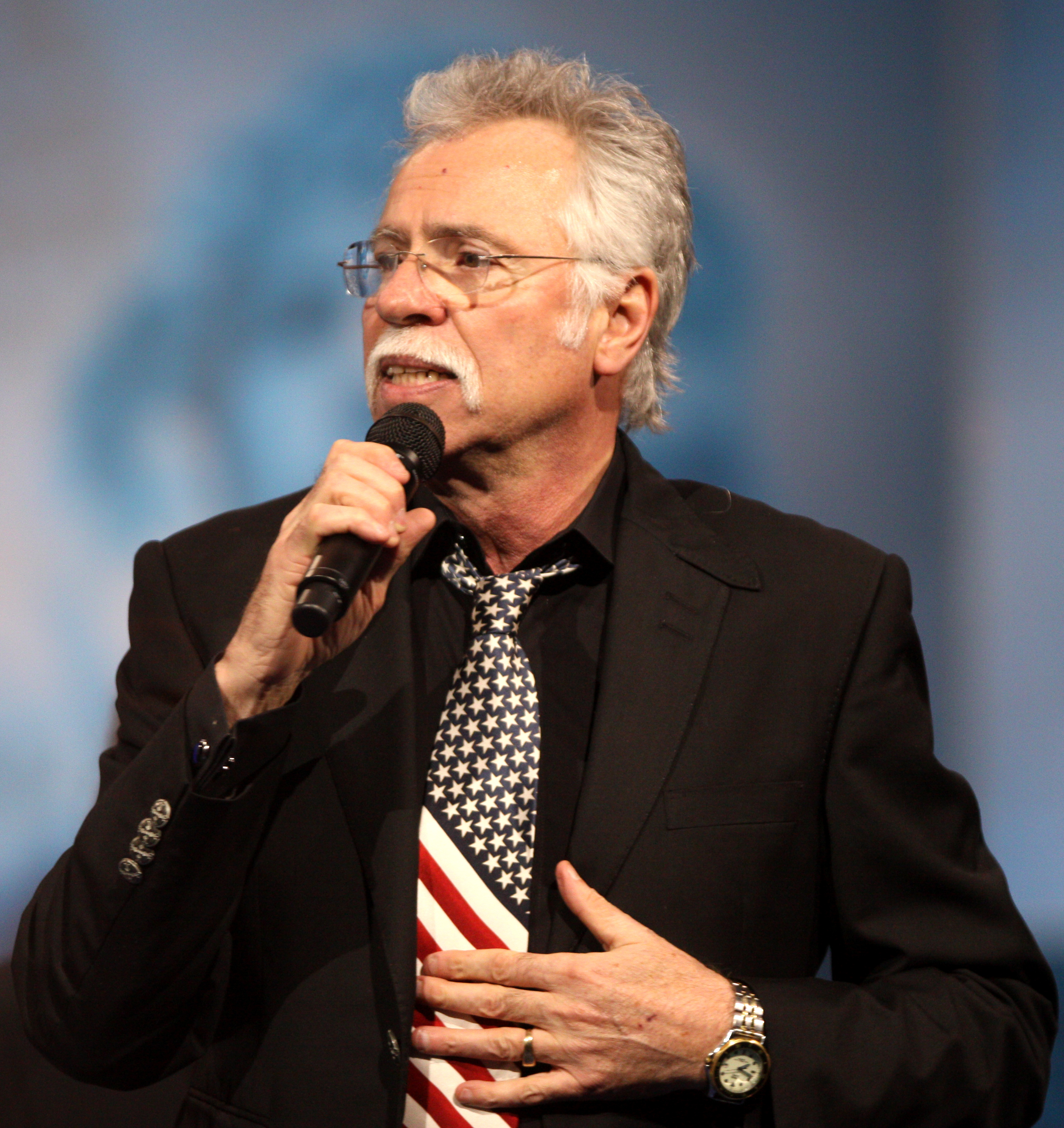
- Bonsall in 2013

Background information
- Born: Joseph Sloan Bonsall Jr. May 18, 1948; Philadelphia, Pennsylvania, U.S.
- Died: July 9, 2024 (aged 76) Hendersonville, Tennessee, U.S.
- Genres: Country, Pop, gospel
- Occupations: Singer, author
- Years active: 1968–2024
- Formerly of: The Oak Ridge Boys
- Website: josephsbonsall.com

Joseph Sloan Bonsall Jr. (May 18, 1948 – July 9, 2024) was an American singer who was tenor vocalist of the Oak Ridge Boys from 1973 to 2023. Besides charting numerous hits as a member of the Oak Ridge Boys, Bonsall had a solo hit guesting with Sawyer Brown on their 1986 single "Out Goin' Cattin'".

== Biography ==
Bonsall was born on May 18, 1948, in Philadelphia, to Joseph Sloan Bonsall Sr., and Lillie Maude Collins, who both served in World War II. He also had a sister, Nancy Marie.

Bonsall performed in the Keystones, a gospel group based in the Northeastern United States until joining the Oak Ridge Boys in 1973. As an author, he released a four-part children's book series in 1997 titled The Molly Books and in 2003 published GI Joe and Lillie, a book about his parents' lives during and after World War II. He also authored On The Road With The Oak Ridge Boys, An American Journey, From My Perspective, and An Inconvenient Christmas. His last book, I See Myself, a memoir, was released posthumously in November 2024.

Bonsall was inducted into the Country Music Hall of Fame in 2015 as a member of the Oak Ridge Boys.

=== Illness and death ===
Bonsall missed tour dates in 2022 due to a pulmonary embolism. Mobility issues required him to perform most of his 2023 tour dates while seated.

On January 3, 2024, Bonsall released a statement announcing his retirement from The Oak Ridge Boys due to a "slow-onset neuromuscular disease", posthumously revealed to be amyotrophic lateral sclerosis (ALS), with which he was diagnosed in 2019. It had not initially affected his breathing or singing ability. Ben James had already replaced him in the group by the time of the announcement.

Bonsall died from complications of ALS in Hendersonville, Tennessee, July 9, 2024, aged 76.

== Discography ==
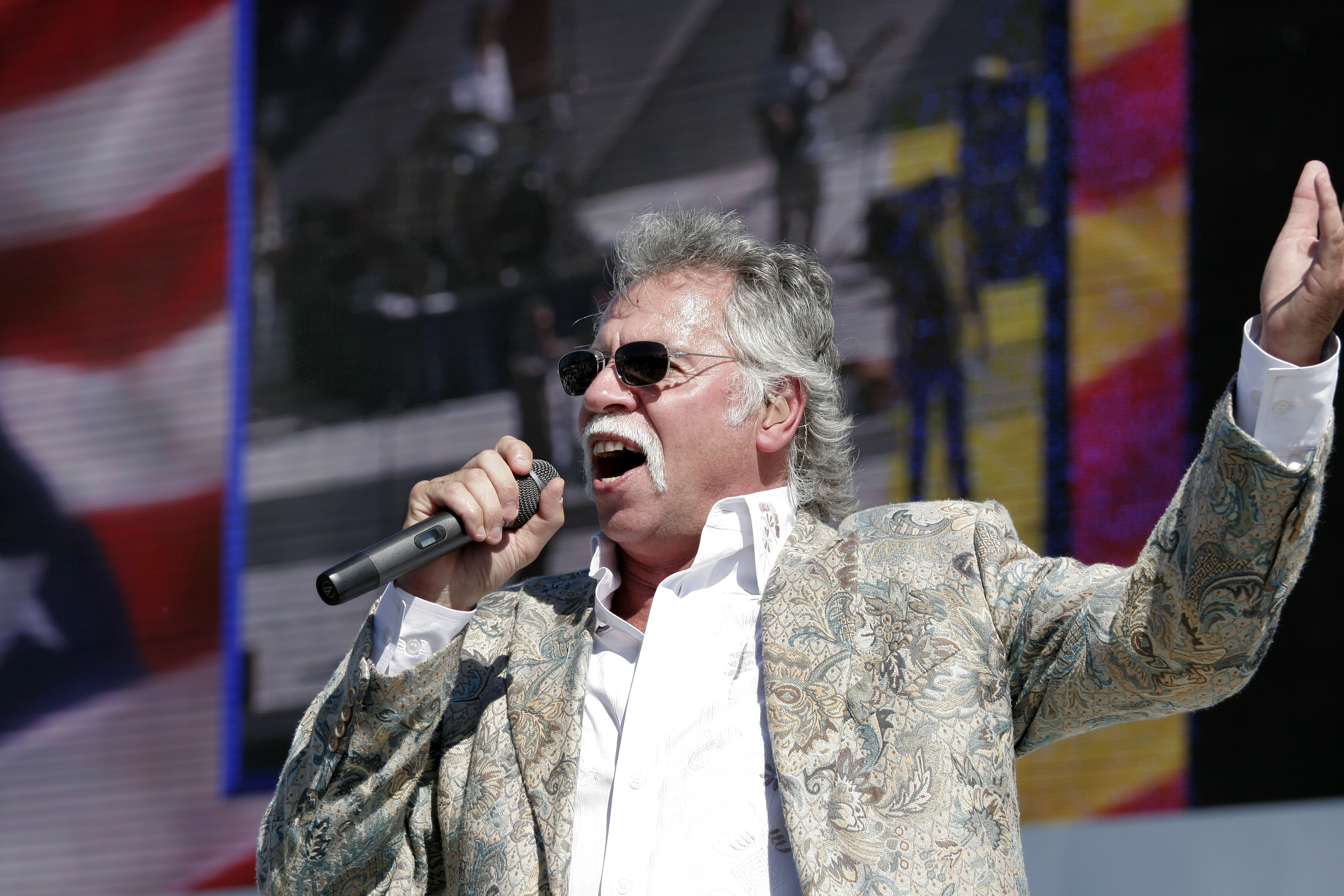
Bonsall performing in 2008

=== Singles ===
Year	Single	Peak positions		Album
Year	Single	US Country	CAN Country	Album
1986	"Out Goin' Cattin'" (Sawyer Brown with "Cat" Joe Bonsall)	11	4	Out Goin' Cattin'
