= Close Harmony (album) =

Box set by The Louvin Brothers
- Released: 1992
- Recorded: December 18, 1947 – September 12, 1963
- Genre: Country, Gospel
- Label: Bear Family
- Producer: Ken Nelson, Fred Rose, Paul Cohen

Close Harmony is a box set of The Louvin Brothers recordings. It is an eight-CD box set and was released in 1992.

== History ==
Close Harmony contains 219 songs from the duo's years with Capitol, Decca, MGM, and Apollo, presented in chronological order along with session notes.

The recordings include such artists as Chet Atkins, Grandpa Jones, The Jordanaires, Jerry Byrd, Pete Drake, Floyd Cramer, Hank Garland and many others.

The annotations for the songs that accompanied the box set were expanded into a book titled In Close Harmony: The Story of the Louvin Brothers by Charles K. Wolfe.

== Reception ==
Professional ratings
Review scores
Source	Rating
Allmusic	5/5 stars

In his Allmusic review, Thom Jurek describes the release, concluding " Charlie and Ira took harmony singing to a new level and the creation of full-length albums far out of the sphere of one or two singles and filler. It's true that this is mainly for the fanatics, but it's also for libraries and historians of the music... This set is a treasure. Period."

== Personnel ==
- Charlie Louvin – vocals, guitar
- Ira Louvin – vocals, tenor guitar, mandolin
- Chet Atkins – guitar
- Grandpa Jones – banjo
- The Jordanaires – vocals
- Harold Bradley – guitar, bass
- Owen Bradley – vibraphone
- Paul Buskirk – mandolin
- Jerry Byrd – pedal steel guitar
- Lightning Chance – bass
- Roy Madison "Junior" Huskey – bass
- Floyd Cramer – piano
- Faye Cunningham – vocals
- Pete Drake – pedal steel guitar
- Ray Edenton – guitar, banjo
- Hank Garland – guitar
- Smiley Wilson – guitar
- Buddy Harman – drums
- William Paul Ackerman – drums
- Don Helms – pedal steel guitar
- Eddie Hill – fiddle, guitar
- Jimmy Capps – guitar
- Paul Yandell – guitar
- Odell Martin – guitar
- George McCormick – guitar, baritone guitar, vocal harmony
- Marvin H. Hughes – piano, organ
- Shot Jackson – dobro
- Thomas Lee Jackson Jr. – fiddle
- Dale Potter – fiddle
- Jimmy Riddle – harmonica

Production notes:

- Paul Cohen – producer
- Ken Nelson – producer
- Fred Rose – producer
- Bob Jones – mastering
- Eddie Stubbs – discography
- Larry Walsh – mixing
- Richard Weize – reissue producer, research
- Mark Wilder – disc dub
- Hoffmann Nienburg – artwork
- Charles K. Wolfe – liner notes, photography, illustrations, discography
- Brad Benedict – photography, illustrations
- Manfred Bersebach – photography, illustrations
- David Freeman – photography, illustrations

== See also ==
- Close harmony
