= Charlie Louvin =

American country music singer and songwriter

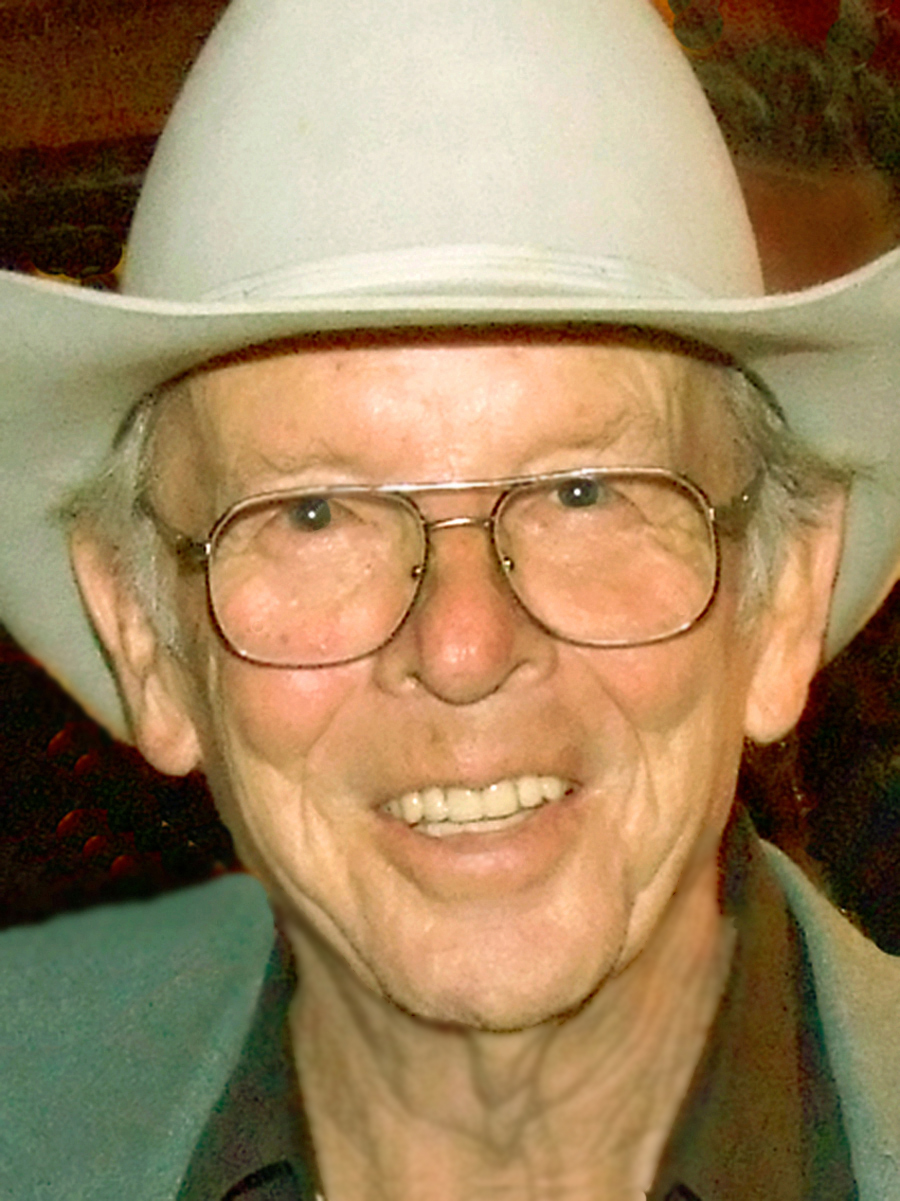
- Charlie Louvin at Banjo Jim's NYC 2008

Background information
- Born: Charles Elzer Loudermilk; July 7, 1927; Section, Alabama, U.S.
- Died: January 26, 2011 (aged 83) Wartrace, Tennessee, U.S.
- Genre: Country
- Occupations: Singer, songwriter
- Instruments: Guitar, vocals
- Years active: 1940s–2000s
- Labels: MGM, Capitol, United Artists, First Generation Records, Playback, Watermelon, Tompkins Square, Audiograph
- Formerly of: The Louvin Brothers, Melba Montgomery

Charles Elzer Loudermilk (July 7, 1927 – January 26, 2011), known professionally as Charlie Louvin, was an American country music singer and songwriter. He is best known as one of the Louvin Brothers, and was a member of the Grand Ole Opry since 1955.

== Biography ==
Born in Section, Alabama, Louvin was one of seven children and grew up working on the family farm in nearby Henagar. He started singing when he was eight years old.

Louvin began singing professionally with his brother Ira as a teenager on local radio programs in Chattanooga, Tennessee. The boys sang traditional and gospel music in the harmony style they had learned while performing in their church's choir.

After Charlie left the act briefly in 1945 to serve in the Army Air Forces during World War II, the brothers moved first to Knoxville and later to Memphis, working as postal clerks by day, while making appearances in the evening. Another brief disbandment due to Charlie's service in the Korean War led to the brothers' relocation to Birmingham, Alabama.

External audio
- Country Music Performer Charlie Louvin, interviewed by Terry Gross on Fresh Air, 22:00, October 24, 2003.

Primarily known as gospel artists, the Louvins were convinced by a sponsor, "you can't sell tobacco with gospel music," and began adding secular music to their repertoire. They began making appearances on the famed Grand Ole Opry during the 1950s, becoming official members in 1955. The Louvin Brothers released numerous singles, such as "When I Stop Dreaming", with over 20 recordings reaching the country music charts. Their rich harmonies served as an influence for later artists, such as Emmylou Harris, Gram Parsons, and The Byrds.

By the 1960s, Charlie and Ira's popularity had waned and the brothers split up in 1963. In 1965, Ira was killed in a car accident. Charlie continued to perform solo, making numerous appearances on the Grand Ole Opry and in later years acting as an elder statesman for country music.

In 2001, the Louvin Brothers were inducted into the Country Music Hall of Fame.

In the 2000s, Charlie had begun rebuilding his career. Although he readily admitted he was never much of a writer, Louvin released a disc of classics containing one new song, a tribute to Ira, and a gospel album on Tompkins Square Records produced by Mark Nevers. The songs mainly pair Louvin with other singers, such as George Jones, Jeff Tweedy of Wilco, Alex McManus of Bright Eyes, Elvis Costello and Derwin Hinson. He also wrote two songs with Rockabilly Hall of Famer Colonel Robert Morris, one of which is on Morris' trucking CD, Highway Hero.

As of 2003, Louvin lived in Manchester, Tennessee. He closed his Louvin Brothers museum in Nashville and was looking to open another one in Monteagle, Tennessee, near Chattanooga. He was a cousin of songwriter John D. Loudermilk.

After his July 2010 cancer surgery, Louvin made his first public appearance, and second to last, at Nashville's Americana Music Conference, Sept. 10th. He performed with Emmylou Harris and longtime Harris and Gram Parsons accompanist Al Perkins on steel guitar.

Louvin made one final public appearance on RFD-TV's The Marty Stuart Show, alongside his son, Sonny Louvin. He performed "See the Big Man Cry", after which country music icon Connie Smith spoke of her admiration for Louvin, before performing "I Don't Love You Anymore". Leroy Troy, alongside Lester Armistead and Dan Kelly, then performed "Bald Knob, Arkansas", which was written by Charlie's brother, Ira Louvin. Marty Stuart and his Fabulous Superlatives then performed the Louvin Brothers gospel song "The Family Who Prays". The show then closed with Louvin singing the Tom T. Hall song "Back When We Were Young", with Stuart accompanying him on mandolin. The show aired on January 29, 2011, three days after Louvin's death. The show ended with a memorial message: "This episode was taped on December 2, 2010. It was to be Mr. Louvin's last televised performance."

Louvin underwent surgery for pancreatic cancer on July 22, 2010. Doctors expected a full recovery, but "the surgery did not go as planned," according to Louvin's son Sonny, and "he will begin using alternative methods of treatment, going forward". Louvin died from its complications in the early morning of January 26, 2011, in his Wartrace, Tennessee, home, aged 83.

== Discography ==
=== Albums ===
Year	Album	US Country	Label
1965	Less and Less & I Don't Love You Anymore	6	Capitol
1966	The Many Moods of Charlie Louvin	9	Capitol
1966	Lonesome Is Me	13	Capitol
1967	I'll Remember Always	22	Capitol
1967	I Forgot to Cry	25	Capitol
1968	Will You Visit Me On Sundays?	—	Capitol
1969	Hey Daddy	37	Capitol
1969	The Kind of Man I Am	32	Capitol
1970	Here's a Toast to Mama	44	Capitol
1970	Ten Times Charlie	—	Capitol
1971	Something to Brag About (w/ Melba Montgomery)	45	Capitol
1971	Baby, You've Got What It Takes (w/ Melba Montgomery)	45	Capitol
1972	The Best of Charlie Louvin	—	Capitol
1974	It Almost Felt Like Love	—	United Artists
1982	Jim and Jesse and Charlie (w/ Jim & Jesse)	—	Soundwaves
1996	The Longest Train (w/ Julian Dawson and Steuart Smith)	—	Watermelon
2006	Echoes of the Louvin Brothers	—	Varèse Sarabande
2007	Charlie Louvin	—	Tompkins Square
2007	Live at Shake It Records	—	Tompkins Square
2008	Steps to Heaven	—	Tompkins Square
2008	Sings Murder Ballads and Disaster Songs	—	Tompkins Square
2009	Hickory Wind: Live at the Gram Parsons Guitar Pull	—	True North Records
2010	The Battles Rage On	—	True North Records

=== Singles ===
Year	Single	Chart Positions		Album
Year	Single	US Country	CAN Country	Album
1964	"I Don't Love You Anymore"	4	1	Less and Less / I Don't Love You Anymore
1965	"Less and Less"	27	—	Less and Less / I Don't Love You Anymore
1965	"See the Big Man Cry"	7	—	Less and Less / I Don't Love You Anymore
1965	"Think I'll Go Somewhere and Cry Myself to Sleep"	26	—	The Many Moods of Charlie Louvin
1966	"You Finally Said Something Good (When You Said Goodbye)"	15	—	Lonesome Is Me
1966	"Something's Wrong"	—	—	Lonesome Is Me
1966	"The Proof Is in the Kissing"	58	—	Will You Visit Me On Sundays?
1967	"Off and On"	38	—	I Forgot to Cry
1967	"On the Other Hand"	44	—	I Forgot to Cry
1967	"I Forgot to Cry"	46	—	I Forgot to Cry
1967	"The Only Way Out (Is to Walk Over Me)"	36	—	Will You Visit Me On Sundays?
1968	"Will You Visit Me On Sundays?"	20	22	Will You Visit Me On Sundays?
1968	"Hey Daddy"	15	21	Hey Daddy
1969	"What Are Those Things (With Big Black Wings)"	19	—	The Kind of Man I Am
1969	"Let's Put Our World Back Together"	27	—	The Kind of Man I Am
1969	"Little Reasons"	29	—	Here's a Toast to Mama
1970	"Here's a Toast to Mama"	42	—	Here's a Toast to Mama
1970	"Tiny Wings"	—	—	Ten Times Charlie
1970	"Come and Get It Mama"	47	—	Ten Times Charlie
1970	"Something to Brag About" (w/ Melba Montgomery)	18	26	Something to Brag About
1970	"Sittin' Bull"	54	—	single only
1971	"Did You Ever" (w/ Melba Montgomery)	26	—	Baby, You've Got What It Takes
1971	"Love Has to Die by Itself"	—	—	The Best of Charlie Louvin
1971	"Baby, You've Got What It Takes" (w/ Melba Montgomery)	30	—	Baby, You've Got What It Takes
1971	"I'm Gonna Leave You" (w/ Melba Montgomery)	60	—	singles only
1972	"I Placed a Call"	—	—	singles only
1972	"Just in Time (To Watch Love Die)"	70	—	singles only
1972	"Baby, What's Wrong with Us" (w/ Melba Montgomery)	66	—	singles only
1973	"A Man Likes Things Like That" (w/ Melba Montgomery)	59	—	singles only
1973	"Bottom of the Fifth"	—	—	singles only
1973	"Funny Man"	—	—	singles only
1974	"You're My Wife, She's My Woman"	36	—	It Almost Felt Like Love
1974	"It Almost Felt Like Love"	76	—	It Almost Felt Like Love
1974	"I Want to See You (One More Time)"	—	—	singles only
1975	"I Just Want a Happy Life"	—	—	singles only
1975	"Is I Love You That Easy to Say"	—	—	singles only
1976	"Sweet Texas"	—	—	singles only
1976	"Store Up Love"	—	—	singles only
1978	"When I Was Your Man"	—	—	singles only
1979	"Two of a Kind"	—	—	singles only
1979	"Love Don't Care" (w/ Emmylou Harris)	91	—	singles only
1982	"North Wind" (w/ Jim & Jesse)	56	—	Jim and Jesse and Charlie
1982	"Showboat Gamblin'" (w/ Jim & Jesse)	—	—	Jim and Jesse and Charlie
1989	"The Precious Jewel" (w/ Roy Acuff)	87	—	singles only
1989	"He Keeps Crying Over You"	—	—	singles only
2007	"Ira"	—	—	Charlie Louvin
2010	"Back When We Were Young"	—	—	"Single Only"
