= Ira Louvin =

American singer-songwriter (1924–1965)

- Born: Ira Lonnie Loudermilk; April 21, 1924
- Origin: Section, Alabama, U.S.
- Died: June 20, 1965 (aged 41) Williamsburg, Missouri, U.S.
- Genres: Country, gospel
- Occupation(s): Singer, songwriter
- Instrument: Mandolin
- Years active: 1940–1965
- Labels: MGM, Capitol

Ira Lonnie Loudermilk (April 21, 1924 – June 20, 1965), known professionally as Ira Louvin, was an American country music singer, mandolinist and songwriter. He was a cousin of songwriter John D. Loudermilk.

== Biography ==
Ira Louvin was born in Section, Alabama, and played together with his brother, Charlie, in the close harmony tradition as the Louvin Brothers. They were heavily influenced by the Delmore Brothers and Monroe Brothers. Ira played mandolin with Charlie Monroe, guitar player of the Monroe Brothers in the early 1940s. The Louvin Brothers' songs were heavily influenced by their Baptist faith and warned against sin.

Ira was notorious for his drinking and short temper. He married four times, his third wife having shot him multiple times in the chest and hand after he allegedly beat her. He died on June 20, 1965, when a drunken driver struck his car in Williamsburg, Missouri. At the time, a warrant for Louvin's arrest had been issued on a DUI charge.
