= Sawyer Brown discography =

Discography of American country music band

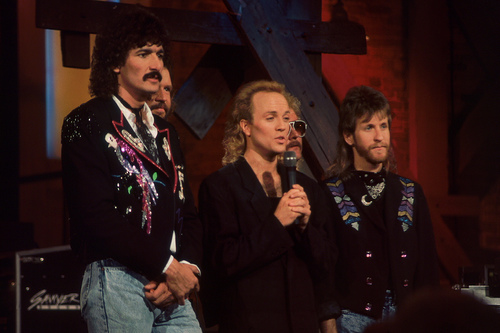
- Sawyer Brown in 1987
- Studio albums: 18
- Live albums: 1
- Compilation albums: 5
- Singles: 60
- Music videos: 36

Sawyer Brown is an American country music band founded in 1981. Their discography comprises 18 studio albums, one live album, and five compilation albums. Of their albums, three have been certified gold by the RIAA: 1992's The Dirt Road, 1993's Outskirts of Town and 1995's Greatest Hits 1990–1995. The latter two are certified gold by the CRIA, as is their 1990 Greatest Hits album, while 1989's The Boys Are Back is certified platinum by the CRIA.

Sawyer Brown has also released 60 singles, of which 51 have charted on the Billboard Hot Country Songs chart between 1984 and 2005. Three of their singles have topped this chart: "Step That Step" in 1985, "Some Girls Do" in 1992, and "Thank God for You" in 1993. Sixteen additional singles have reached Top Ten on the same chart.

== Studio albums ==
=== 1980s ===
| Title | Album details | Peak positions | | | Certifications (sales thresholds) |
| Title | Album details | US Country | US | CAN | Certifications (sales thresholds) |
|---|---|---|---|---|---|
| Sawyer Brown | Release date: 1984; Label: Capitol/Curb Records; Formats: LP, CD, cassette | 2 | 140 | — | |
| Shakin' | Release date: 1985; Label: Capitol/Curb Records; Formats: LP, CD, cassette | 3 | — | — | |
| Out Goin' Cattin' | Release date: 1986; Label: Capitol/Curb Records; Formats: LP, CD, cassette | 8 | — | — | |
| Somewhere in the Night | Release date: August 12, 1987; Label: Capitol/Curb Records; Formats: LP, CD, cassette | 16 | — | — | |
| Wide Open | Release date: October 4, 1988; Label: Capitol/Curb Records; Formats: LP, CD, cassette | 33 | — | — | |
| The Boys Are Back | Release date: September 19, 1989; Label: Capitol/Curb Records; Formats: LP, CD, cassette | 5 | — | 85 | CAN: Platinum |
"—" denotes releases that did not chart

=== 1990s ===
| Title | Album details | Peak positions | | | Certifications (sales thresholds) |
| Title | Album details | US Country | US | CAN Country | Certifications (sales thresholds) |
|---|---|---|---|---|---|
| Buick | Release date: January 7, 1991; Label: Capitol/Curb Records; Formats: CD, cassette | 23 | 140 | — | |
| The Dirt Road | Release date: January 6, 1992; Label: Capitol/Curb Records; Formats: CD, cassette | 12 | 68 | 8 | US: Gold |
| Cafe on the Corner | Release date: August 25, 1992; Label: Curb Records; Formats: CD, cassette | 23 | 117 | 10 | |
| Outskirts of Town | Release date: August 10, 1993; Label: Curb Records; Formats: CD, cassette | 13 | 81 | 2 | CAN: Gold; US: Gold |
| This Thing Called Wantin' and Havin' It All | Release date: August 29, 1995; Label: Curb Records; Formats: CD, cassette | 10 | 77 | — | |
| Six Days on the Road | Release date: April 15, 1997; Label: Curb Records; Formats: CD, cassette | 8 | 73 | — | |
| Hallelujah, He Is Born | Release date: August 19, 1997; Label: Curb Records; Formats: CD, cassette | 42 | — | — | |
| Drive Me Wild | Release date: March 2, 1999; Label: Curb Records; Formats: CD, cassette | 10 | 99 | 9 | |
"—" denotes releases that did not chart

=== 2000s, 2010s, and 2020s ===
| Title | Album details | Peak positions |
| Title | Album details | US Country |
|---|---|---|
| Can You Hear Me Now | Release date: July 9, 2002; Label: Curb Records; Formats: CD, cassette | 39 |
| Mission Temple Fireworks Stand | Release date: August 23, 2005; Label: Curb Records; Formats: CD, music download | 47 |
| Rejoice | Release date: November 1, 2008; Label: O-Seven; Formats: CD, music download | — |
| Travelin' Band | Release date: October 10, 2011; Label: Beach Street Records; Formats: CD, music download | — |
| Desperado Troubadours | Release date: March 8, 2024; Label: Curb Records; Formats: CD, music download | — |
"—" denotes releases that did not chart

== Compilation albums ==
| Title | Album details | Peak positions | | | | Certifications (sales thresholds) |
| Title | Album details | US Country | US | CAN Country | CAN | Certifications (sales thresholds) |
|---|---|---|---|---|---|---|
| Greatest Hits | Release date: August 27, 1990; Label: Capitol/Curb Records; Formats: CD, cassette | 26 | — | — | — | CAN: Gold |
| Greatest Hits 1990–1995 | Release date: January 24, 1995; Label: Curb Records; Formats: CD, cassette | 5 | 44 | 7 | 35 | CAN: Gold; US: Platinum |
| True Believer | Release date: April 8, 2003; Label: Curb Records; Formats: CD | — | — | — | — | |
| Best of Sawyer Brown | Release date: May 6, 2008; Label: Curb Records; Formats: CD, music download | — | — | — | — | |
| All-Time Greatest Hits | Release date: September 15, 2017; Label: Curb Records; Formats: Music download | — | — | — | — | |
"—" denotes releases that did not chart

== Live albums ==
| Title | Album details | Peak positions |
| Title | Album details | US Country |
|---|---|---|
| The Hits Live | Release date: November 7, 2000; Label: Curb Records; Formats: CD, cassette | 35 |

== Singles ==
=== 1980s ===
| Year | Single | Peak positions | | Certifications | Album |
| Year | Single | US Country | CAN Country | Certifications | Album |
|---|---|---|---|---|---|
| 1984 | "Leona" | 16 | — | | Sawyer Brown |
| 1985 | "Step That Step" | 1 | 1 | | Sawyer Brown |
| 1985 | "Used to Blue" | 3 | 1 | | Sawyer Brown |
| 1985 | "Betty's Bein' Bad" | 5 | 5 | | Shakin' |
| 1986 | "Heart Don't Fall Now" | 14 | 16 | | Shakin' |
| 1986 | "Shakin'" | 15 | 7 | | Shakin' |
| 1986 | "Out Goin' Cattin'" (with "Cat" Joe Bonsall) | 11 | 4 | | Out Goin' Cattin' |
| 1986 | "Gypsies on Parade" | 25 | 23 | | Out Goin' Cattin' |
| 1987 | "Savin' the Honey for the Honeymoon" | 58 | — | | Out Goin' Cattin' |
| 1987 | "Somewhere in the Night" | 29 | 26 | | Somewhere in the Night |
| 1987 | "This Missin' You Heart of Mine" | 2 | 1 | | Somewhere in the Night |
| 1988 | "Old Photographs" | 27 | 35 | | Somewhere in the Night |
| 1988 | "My Baby's Gone" | 11 | 5 | | Wide Open |
| 1989 | "Old Pair of Shoes" | 50 | — | | Wide Open |
| 1989 | "The Race Is On" | 5 | 3 | RIAA: Gold | The Boys Are Back |
"—" denotes releases that did not chart

=== 1990s ===
| Year | Single | Peak positions | | | | Certifications | Album |
| Year | Single | US Country | US | US AC | CAN Country | Certifications | Album |
|---|---|---|---|---|---|---|---|
| 1990 | "Did It for Love" | 33 | — | — | 23 | | The Boys Are Back |
| 1990 | "Puttin' the Dark Back into the Night" | 33 | — | — | 19 | | The Boys Are Back |
| 1990 | "When Love Comes Callin'" | 40 | — | — | 18 | | Greatest Hits |
| 1991 | "One Less Pony" | 70 | — | — | 49 | | Buick |
| 1991 | "Mama's Little Baby Loves Me" | 68 | — | — | — | | Buick |
| 1991 | "The Walk" | 2 | — | — | 5 | | Buick / The Dirt Road |
| 1991 | "The Dirt Road" | 3 | — | — | 1 | | The Dirt Road |
| 1992 | "Some Girls Do" | 1 | — | — | 2 | RIAA: Platinum | The Dirt Road |
| 1992 | "Cafe on the Corner" | 5 | — | — | 2 | | Cafe on the Corner |
| 1992 | "All These Years" | 3 | — | 42 | 2 | | Cafe on the Corner |
| 1993 | "Trouble on the Line" | 5 | — | — | 7 | | Cafe on the Corner |
| 1993 | "Thank God for You" | 1 | — (Note: "Thank God for You" did not enter the Hot 100, but peaked at number 17 on Bubbling Under Hot 100 Singles.) | — | 1 | | Outskirts of Town |
| 1993 | "The Boys and Me" | 4 | — | — | 2 | | Outskirts of Town |
| 1994 | "Outskirts of Town" | 40 | — | — | 32 | | Outskirts of Town |
| 1994 | "Hard to Say" | 5 | — | — | 20 | | Outskirts of Town |
| 1994 | "This Time" | 2 | — | — | 5 | | Greatest Hits 1990–1995 |
| 1995 | "I Don't Believe in Goodbye" | 4 | — | — | 8 | | Greatest Hits 1990–1995 |
| 1995 | "(This Thing Called) Wantin' and Havin' It All" | 11 | — | — | 5 | | This Thing Called; Wantin' and Havin' It All |
| 1995 | "'Round Here" | 19 | — | — | 19 | | This Thing Called; Wantin' and Havin' It All |
| 1996 | "Treat Her Right" | 3 | — | — | 19 | | This Thing Called; Wantin' and Havin' It All |
| 1996 | "She's Gettin' There" | 46 | — | — | 89 | | This Thing Called; Wantin' and Havin' It All |
| 1997 | "Six Days on the Road" | 13 | — (Note: "Six Days on the Road" did not enter the Hot 100, but peaked at number 17 on Bubbling Under Hot 100 Singles.) | — | 9 | | Six Days on the Road |
| 1997 | "This Night Won't Last Forever" | 6 | — (Note: "This Night Won't Last Forever" did not enter the Hot 100, but peaked at number 9 on Bubbling Under Hot 100 Singles.) | — | 11 | | Six Days on the Road |
| 1998 | "Another Side" | 55 | — | — | 53 | | Six Days on the Road |
| 1998 | "Small Talk" | 60 | — | — | — | | Six Days on the Road |
| 1998 | "Drive Me Wild" | 6 | 44 | — | 1 | | Drive Me Wild |
| 1999 | "I'm in Love with Her" | 47 | — | — | 50 | | Drive Me Wild |
"—" denotes releases that did not chart

=== 2000s–present ===
| Year | Single | Peak positions | | Album |
| Year | Single | US Country | US Christ | Album |
|---|---|---|---|---|
| 2000 | "800 Pound Jesus" | 40 | — | Drive Me Wild |
| 2000 | "Perfect World" (Note: "Perfect World" peaked at number 81 on the RPM Country Tracks chart in Canada.) | 50 | — | The Hits Live |
| 2000 | "Lookin' for Love" | 44 | — | The Hits Live |
| 2002 | "Circles" | 45 | — | Can You Hear Me Now |
| 2002 | "Can You Hear Me Now" | 57 | — | Can You Hear Me Now |
| 2002 | "I Need a Girlfriend" | — | — | Can You Hear Me Now |
| 2003 | "I'll Be Around" | 48 | — | —N/a |
| 2004 | "Mission Temple Fireworks Stand" (with Robert Randolph) | 55 | — | Mission Temple Fireworks Stand |
| 2005 | "They Don't Understand" | 36 | 15 | Mission Temple Fireworks Stand |
| 2006 | "Keep Your Hands to Yourself" | — | — | Mission Temple Fireworks Stand |
| 2011 | "Smokin' Hot Wife" | — | — | Travelin' Band |
| 2011 | "Travelin' Band" | — | — | Travelin' Band |
| 2012 | "Ain't Goin' Out That Way" | — | — | Travelin' Band |
| 2013 | "Shadows of the Heartland" | — | — | —N/a |
| 2014 | "Walk Out of the Rain" | — | — | Travelin' Band |
| 2015 | "We Got the Night" | — | — | —N/a |
| 2023 | "Under This Ole Hat" | — | — | Desperado Troubadours |
| 2024 | "Desperado Troubadours" | — | — | Desperado Troubadours |
"—" denotes releases that did not chart

=== Christmas singles ===
| Year | Single | Peak positions | Album |
| Year | Single | US Country | Album |
|---|---|---|---|
| 1989 | "It Wasn't His Child" | 51 | Wide Open |
| 2012 | "Joseph's Prayer" | — | —N/a |
"—" denotes releases that did not chart

== Videography ==
=== Music videos ===
| Year | Title | Director |
|---|---|---|
| 1985 | "Step That Step" | Mark Rezyka/David Hogan |
| 1985 | "Betty's Bein' Bad" | Martin Kahan |
| 1986 | "Heart Don't Fall Now" | Martin Kahan |
| 1986 | "Shakin'" | Martin Kahan |
| 1986 | "Out Goin' Cattin'" (with "Cat" Joe Bonsall) | Martin Kahan |
| 1987 | "Somewhere in the Night" | Jack Cole/John Lloyd Miller |
| 1988 | "My Baby's Gone" | Martin Kahan |
| 1989 | "The Race Is On" | John Lloyd Miller |
| 1990 | "Did It for Love" | Marc Ball |
| 1990 | "When Love Comes Callin'" | David Montgomery |
| 1991 | "One Less Pony" | Brett Darken |
| 1991 | "Superman's Daughter" | Brett Darken |
| 1991 | "The Walk" | Michael Salomon |
| 1992 | "The Dirt Road" | Michael Salomon |
| 1992 | "Some Girls Do" | Michael Salomon |
| 1992 | "Cafe on the Corner" | Michael Salomon |
| 1993 | "All These Years" | Michael Salomon |
| 1993 | "Thank God for You" | Michael Salomon |
| 1993 | "The Boys and Me" | Michael Salomon |
| 1994 | "Outskirts of Town" | Michael Salomon |
| 1994 | "Hard to Say" | Michael Salomon |
| 1995 | "This Time" | Michael Salomon |
| 1995 | "I Don't Believe in Goodbye" | Michael Salomon |
| 1995 | "(This Thing Called) Wantin' and Havin' It All" | Michael Salomon |
| 1995 | "'Round Here" | Michael Salomon |
| 1996 | "Treat Her Right" | Michael Salomon |
| 1997 | "Six Days on the Road" | Michael Salomon |
| 1997 | "This Night Won't Last Forever" (with Mac McAnally and Steve Wariner) | Michael Salomon |
| 1997 | "Hallelujah He Is Born" | Michael McNamara |
| 1998 | "Another Side" | Michael Salomon |
| 1998 | "Drive Me Wild" | Michael Salomon |
| 2000 | "800 Pound Jesus" | Michael Salomon |
| 2000 | "Lookin' for Love" (live) | |
| 2002 | "I Need a Girlfriend" | Michael Salomon |
| 2005 | "Mission Temple Fireworks Stand" | Shaun Silva |
| 2005 | "They Don't Understand" | Jason Epperson/Lark Watts |
| 2023 | "Under This Ole Hat" | Trey Fanjoy |
| 2024 | "Desperado Troubadours" | Peter Zavadil |
