= The Hits Live =

Live album by Sawyer Brown
- Released: November 7, 2000
- Recorded: 1999–2000
- Genre: Country
- Length: 60:55
- Label: Curb
- Producer: Mark A. Miller; Brian Tankersley

Sawyer Brown chronology
Drive Me Wild (1999)	The Hits Live (2000)	Can You Hear Me Now (2002)

Professional ratings
Review scores
Source	Rating
Allmusic	3/5 stars

The Hits Live is the title of a live compilation album released in 2000 by the American country music band Sawyer Brown. The album comprises fourteen live renditions of their 1980s and 1990s country hits recorded on tour from late 1999 to early 2000, with the majority coming from a show in Ogden, Utah. The single "800 Pound Jesus" is from their 1999 album Drive Me Wild. The other three tracks—"Perfect World", "Garage Band" and a cover of Johnny Lee's "Lookin' for Love"—are new to this album. "Perfect World" and "Lookin' for Love" were both released as singles, respectively peaking at #50 and #44 on the country charts.

== Track listing ==
1. "Six Days on the Road" (Carl Montgomery, Earl Green) – 2:58
  - Recorded live December 17, 1999 in Joliet, Illinois
2. "Hard to Say" (Mark Miller) – 3:19
  - Recorded live February 25, 2000 in Ogden, Utah
3. "This Time" (Miller, Mac McAnally) – 2:38
  - Recorded live February 25, 2000 in Ogden, Utah
4. "Cafe on the Corner" (McAnally) – 3:20
  - Recorded live November 6, 1999 in Taylorville, Illinois
5. "The Walk" (Miller) – 3:47
  - Recorded live December 19, 1999 in Spirit Lake, Idaho
6. "Step That Step" (Miller) – 3:01
  - Recorded live January 26, 2000 in Mt. Pleasant, Michigan
7. "The Dirt Road" (Gregg Hubbard, Miller) – 3:08
  - Recorded live December 17, 1999 in Joliet, Illinois
8. "This Night Won't Last Forever" (Bill LaBounty, Roy Freeland) – 3:43
  - Recorded live November 6, 1999 in Taylorville, Illinois
9. "All These Years" (McAnally) – 3:49
  - Recorded live December 28, 1999 in Nashville, Tennessee
10. "The Boys and Me" (McAnally, Miller) – 4:27
  - Recorded live February 25, 2000 in Ogden, Utah
11. "Thank God for You" (McAnally, Miller) – 2:56
  - Recorded live February 25, 2000 in Ogden, Utah
12. "The Race Is On" (Don Rollins) – 3:04
  - Recorded live February 25, 2000 in Ogden, Utah
13. "Drive Me Wild" (Hubbard, Miller, Mike Lawler) – 3:29
  - Recorded live November 19, 1999 in Warsaw, Indiana
14. "Some Girls Do" (Miller) – 3:47
  - Recorded live February 25, 2000 in Ogden, Utah
15. "Perfect World" (Miller, Chuck Cannon, Billy Maddox, Paul Thorn) – 3:18
16. "Garage Band" (Miller) – 3:34
17. "800 Pound Jesus" (Maddox, Thorn) – 2:51
18. "Lookin' for Love" (Wanda Mallette, Bob Morrison, Pat Ryan) – 3:36

== Personnel ==
As listed in liner notes.

Sawyer Brown

- Mark Miller – lead vocals
- Gregg "Hobie" Hubbard – keyboards, backing vocals
- Duncan Cameron – lead guitars, backing vocals
- Joe Erkman – rhythm guitars (support on live shows)
- Jim Scholten – bass
- Joe "Curley" Smyth – drums, percussion
- Jimmy Myers – percussion (support on live shows)

Additional musicians

- Bernie Herms – keyboards, acoustic piano
- Blair Masters – keyboards
- Brian Tankersley – programming
- George Cocchini – guitars
- Michael Hodge – guitars
- Jerry McPherson – guitars
- Dale Oliver – guitars
- Lonnie Wilson – drums, percussion

== Production ==
- Mark A. Miller – producer
- Brian Tankersley – producer, recording, mixing
- Bob Blesius – live music recording
- Sam Hewitt – recording assistant, additional live recording
- Sandy Williams – recording assistant, additional live recording
- Hank Williams – mastering
- Monica Mercer – art direction, design
- Dean Dixon – photography
- Henry Diltz – live photography
- Rick Malkin – live photography
- Paige Molesworth – hair, make-up

Studios

- Recorded at GBT Studio (Nashville, Tennessee); Sound Kitchen (Franklin, Tennessee); Dream Valley.
- Mixed at GBT Studio
- Mastered at MasterMix (Nashville, Tennessee).

== Chart performance ==
Chart (2000)	Peak position
U.S. Billboard Top Country Albums	35
