= Greatest Hits 1990–1995 =

Greatest hits album by Sawyer Brown
- Released: January 24, 1995
- Genre: Country
- Length: 32:14
- Label: Curb
- Producer: Mark Miller, Mac McAnally

Sawyer Brown chronology
Outskirts of Town (1993)	Greatest Hits 1990–1995 (1995)	This Thing Called Wantin' and Havin' It All (1995)

Singles from Greatest Hits 1990-1995
- 1. "This Time" Released: November 14, 1994; 2. "I Don't Believe in Goodbye" Released: March 6, 1995

Professional ratings
Review scores
Source	Rating
Allmusic	link

Greatest Hits 1990–1995 is the second compilation album by American country music band Sawyer Brown. It features eight top 5 hits from four albums for Capitol/Curb: 1990's Buick, 1992's The Dirt Road and Cafe on the Corner, and 1993's Outskirts of Town. Two new tracks — "This Time" and "I Don't Believe in Goodbye" — are also included on this album. These songs were both released in 1995, peaking at #2 and #4, respectively, on the Billboard Hot Country Singles & Tracks (now Hot Country Songs) charts.

== Track listing ==
No.	Title	Writer(s)	Length
1.	"Some Girls Do"	Mark Miller	3:12
2.	"Thank God for You"	Miller, Mac McAnally	3:17
3.	"All These Years"	McAnally	3:21
4.	"The Dirt Road"	Miller, Gregg Hubbard	2:52
5.	"This Time"	Miller, McAnally	2:42
6.	"The Walk"	Miller	3:43
7.	"Trouble on the Line"	Miller, Bill Shore	2:31
8.	"Cafe on the Corner"	McAnally	3:22
9.	"I Don't Believe in Goodbye"	Miller, Scotty Emerick, Bryan White	3:51
10.	"The Boys and Me"	Miller, McAnally	3:23

== Charts ==
=== Weekly charts ===
Chart (1995)	Peak position
Canadian Albums (RPM)	35
Canadian Country Albums (RPM)	7
US Billboard 200	44
US Top Country Albums (Billboard)	5

=== Year-end charts ===
Chart (1995)	Position
US Billboard 200	175
US Top Country Albums (Billboard)	28

== Certifications ==
Region	Certification	Certified units/sales
Canada (Music Canada)	Gold	50,000^{^}
United States (RIAA)	Platinum	1,000,000^{‡}
^{^} Shipments figures based on certification alone.^{‡} Sales+streaming figures based on certification alone.
