= Michael Salomon =

American music video/film director

- Born: Whitefish Bay, Wisconsin
- Occupations: music video director filmmaker
- Years active: 1990s–present

Michael Salomon (born in Whitefish Bay, Wisconsin, United States) is an American music video/film director, who has directed many music videos, including many of Toby Keith's music videos. He directed the video for Metallica's "One", which was nominated for "Best Heavy Metal Video" at the MTV awards, and was declared one of the "Top 75 Videos Of All Time" in Rolling Stone's critics' poll.

He later won numerous awards, including the CMT (Country Music Television) "Director of the Year" awards in 1994, 1995 and 1996, Michael again performed his work, creating award-winning videos for Toby Keith, Trisha Yearwood, Alan Jackson, Lonestar, Brooks & Dunn, over twenty videos for Sawyer Brown and others. His association with Toby earned Salomon the CMT Flameworthy Awards in 2002, including one for "Director of the Year" and awards in 2003 including "Video of the Year."

Most recently, Salomon teamed up again with Toby and directed the 2008 film Beer For My Horses, which starred Toby Keith, with guest stars Rodney Carrington, and Willie Nelson. Salomon had also directed the music video for "Beer for My Horses" in 2003.

Salomon also worked on projects for Garth Brooks, Madonna, Mick Jagger, Janet Jackson, Billy Joel, Whitney Houston, Bon Jovi, Ozzy Osbourne and many others as an editor.

In addition to the list of music videos, Salomon has directed and or segment-directed a wide variety of longform home videos, commercials, network specials and syndicated series. He directed the NBC Special, "Garth Brooks: Live From Dublin." The special garnered an Emmy nomination for Salomon.

== Filmography ==
- Beer for My Horses (2008)

== Videography ==
=== Videos directed ===
160 music videos are currently listed here.

Year	Video	Artist
1987	"The Weekend"	Steve Wariner
1988	"Can't Stop Now"	New Grass Revival
1988	"I Knew Love"	Nanci Griffith
1988	"I Should Be with You"	Steve Wariner
1988	"Light Years"	Glen Campbell
1989	"One" (with Bill Pope)	Metallica
1989	"Beneath the Texas Moon"	J.C. Crowley
1989	"Home to Alaska"	Lee Greenwood
1989	"Callin' Baton Rouge"	New Grass Revival
1990	"Closer to the Flame"	Dave Edmunds
1990	"Sixteen Tons"	Eric Burdon
1990	"Black Coffee"	Lacy J. Dalton
1990	"Nobody's Talking" (with Jim May)	Exile
1990	"Is It Love" (with Bud Schaetzle)	Foster & Lloyd
1990	"Everybody Wants to Be Hank Williams"	Larry Boone
1990	"Comin' Back For More"	C. W. McCall
1990	"Rollin' Home"	Pirates of the Mississippi
1990	"You Don't Miss a Thing"	Eddy Arnold
1991	"Rockin' Years"	Dolly Parton with Ricky Van Shelton
1991	"Goin' by the Book" (with Coke Sams)	Johnny Cash
1991	"Bing Bang Boom"	Highway 101
1991	"Shadow of a Doubt"	Earl Thomas Conley
1991	"If the Devil Danced (In Empty Pockets)"	Joe Diffie
1991	"The Walk"	Sawyer Brown
1991	"Picture of You"	Great Plains
1992	"The Dirt Road"	Sawyer Brown
1992	"Some Girls Do"	Sawyer Brown
1992	"If You Can't Find a Reason to Be Happy"	Buck Owens
1992	"Cafe on the Corner"	Sawyer Brown
1992	"The Trouble with Diamonds"	Mac McAnally
1992	"All These Years"	Sawyer Brown
1993	"Standing Knee Deep in a River (Dying of Thirst)"	Kathy Mattea
1993	"Cleopatra, Queen of Denial"	Pam Tillis
1993	"Daddy Laid the Blues on Me"	Bobbie Cryner
1993	"Thank God for You"	Sawyer Brown
1993	"The Boys and Me"	Sawyer Brown
1993	"For Your Love"	Chris LeDoux
1994	"Outskirts of Town"	Sawyer Brown
1994	"Hard to Say"	Sawyer Brown
1994	"Summertime Blues"	Alan Jackson
1994	"Honky Tonk World"	Chris LeDoux
1994	"Nothin' but Good"	Dawn Sears
1994	"Baby Likes to Rock It"	The Tractors
1994	"Shut Up and Kiss Me"	Mary Chapin Carpenter
1994	"This Time"	Sawyer Brown
1994	"Tender When I Want to Be"	Mary Chapin Carpenter
1995	"I Don't Believe in Goodbye"	Sawyer Brown
1995	"I Believe"	Blessid Union of Souls
1995	"House of Cards"	Mary Chapin Carpenter
1995	"What Do You Want With His Love"	David Ball
1995	"Where Do I Go from You"	Jon Secada
1995	"(This Thing Called) Wantin' and Havin' It All"	Sawyer Brown
1995	"That's as Close as I'll Get to Loving You"	Aaron Tippin
1995	"The Car"	Jeff Carson
1995	"'Round Here"	Sawyer Brown
1996	"Treat Her Right"	Sawyer Brown
1996	"Meant to Be"	Sammy Kershaw
1996	"Wild at Heart"	Lari White
1996	"The Road You Leave Behind"	David Lee Murphy
1996	"Don Juan d'Bubba"	Hank Williams, Jr.
1996	"Betty's Got a Bass Boat"	Pam Tillis
1996	"Five Dollar Fine"	Chris LeDoux
1996	"All I Do Is Love Her"	James Bonamy
1996	"Shangri-La"	The Rutles
1996	"She's Really Something to See"	David Lee Murphy
1996	"Good as I Was to You"	Lorrie Morgan
1997	"Feels Like Heaven (With You)"	BeBe & CeCe Winans
1997	"Six Days on the Road"	Sawyer Brown
1997	"I Could Love a Man Like That"	Anita Cochran
1997	"We Were in Love"	Toby Keith
1997	"This Night Won't Last Forever"	Sawyer Brown with Steve Wariner and Mac McAnally
1997	"In Another's Eyes"	Garth Brooks with Trisha Yearwood
1997	"Love of My Life"	Sammy Kershaw
1997	"Hillbilly Town"	Seminole
1998	"Dream Walkin'"	Toby Keith
1998	"Another Side"	Sawyer Brown
1998	"Holes in the Floor of Heaven"	Steve Wariner
1998	"Tired"	Toby Keith
1998	"Getcha Some"	Toby Keith
1998	"One Day Left to Live"	Sammy Kershaw
1998	"Tearin' It Up (And Burnin' It Down)"	Garth Brooks
1998	"It's Your Song"	Garth Brooks
1998	"Drive Me Wild"	Sawyer Brown
1999	"Life Is a Highway"	Chris LeDoux
1999	"When Love Fades"	Toby Keith
1999	"Until You Loved Me"	The Moffatts
1999	"Stampede"	Chris LeDoux
1999	"How Do You Like Me Now?!"	Toby Keith
2000	"800 Pound Jesus"	Sawyer Brown
2000	"Almost Doesn't Count"	Mark Wills
2000	"Silence on the Line"	Chris LeDoux
2000	"You Shouldn't Kiss Me Like This"	Toby Keith
2001	"I'm Just Talkin' About Tonight"	Toby Keith
2001	"I'm Already There"	Lonestar
2001	"I Wanna Talk About Me"	Toby Keith
2002	"My List"	Toby Keith
2002	"Courtesy of the Red, White and Blue (The Angry American)"	Toby Keith
2002	"I Need a Girlfriend"	Sawyer Brown
2002	"Who's Your Daddy?"	Toby Keith
2002	"Chrome"	Trace Adkins
2003	"Beer for My Horses"	Toby Keith with Willie Nelson
2003	"Where's Your Mommy?"	Cledus T. Judd
2003	"I Love This Bar"	Toby Keith
2003	"I Can't Take You Anywhere"	Scotty Emerick
2003	"Hot Mama"	Trace Adkins
2003	"You Can't Take the Honky Tonk Out of the Girl"	Brooks & Dunn
2003	"American Soldier"	Toby Keith
2004	"The Coast Is Clear"	Scotty Emerick
2004	"Whiskey Girl"	Toby Keith
2004	"Men Don't Change"	Amy Dalley
2004	"Rough & Ready"	Trace Adkins
2004	"The Girl's Gone Wild"	Travis Tritt
2004	"The Watch"	Scotty Emerick
2004	"You Do Your Thing"	Montgomery Gentry
2004	"Stays in Mexico"	Toby Keith
2004	"That's What It's All About"	Brooks & Dunn
2005	"I Would Cry"	Amy Dalley
2005	"Songs About Me"	Trace Adkins
2005	"Honkytonk U"	Toby Keith
2005	"As Good as I Once Was"	Toby Keith
2005	"Play Something Country"	Brooks & Dunn
2005	"Big Blue Note"	Toby Keith
2005	"Honky Tonk Badonkadonk"	Trace Adkins
2006	"Get Drunk and Be Somebody"	Toby Keith
2006	"A Little Too Late"	Toby Keith
2006	"Swing"	Trace Adkins
2006	"Crash Here Tonight"	Toby Keith
2006	"Ladies Love Country Boys"	Trace Adkins
2006	"Hillbilly Deluxe"	Brooks & Dunn
2007	"High Maintenance Woman"	Toby Keith
2007	"Thinkin' 'Bout You"	Fred Eaglesmith
2007	"Love Me If You Can"	Toby Keith
2007	"I Got My Game On"	Trace Adkins
2007	"Go Tell It on the Mountain"	Toby Keith with Jewel
2008	"Things a Mama Don't Know"	Mica Roberts
2008	"Off the Hillbilly Hook"	Trailer Choir
2008	"God Love Her"	Toby Keith
2009	"Marry for Money"	Trace Adkins
2009	"Sideways"	Dierks Bentley
2009	"American Ride"	Toby Keith
2009	"Cryin' for Me (Wayman's Song)"	Toby Keith
2010	"Daddy Phone"	Marty Raybon
2010	"I Keep On Loving You"	Reba McEntire
2010	"Rollin' Through the Sunshine"	Trailer Choir
2010	"This Ain't No Love Song"	Trace Adkins
2010	"Trailerhood"	Toby Keith
2010	"Bullets in the Gun"	Toby Keith
2011	"Look It Up"	Ashton Shepherd
2011	"Brown Chicken, Brown Cow"	Trace Adkins
2011	"Made in America"	Toby Keith
2011	"Red Solo Cup"	Toby Keith
2012	"I Like Girls That Drink Beer"	Toby Keith
2012	"Hope on the Rocks"	Toby Keith
2013	"Daddy Dance with Me"	Krystal Keith
2013	"Too Drunk to Karaoke"	Jimmy Buffett with Toby Keith
2014	"Drunk Americans"	Toby Keith
2017	"Shitty Golfer"	Toby Keith
