= Drive Me Wild (disambiguation) =

Drive Me Wild is an album by Sawyer Brown.

Drive Me Wild may also refer to:

- "Drive Me Wild" (song), by Sawyer Brown
- Drive Me Wild, a romance novel by Vicki Lewis Thompson
- "Drive Me Wild", a song by Nona Hendryx from the 1987 album Female Trouble
- "Drive Me Wild", a song by Vanity 6, 1982
