= Small Town Hero =

Small Town Hero or Small Town Heroes may refer to:

- "Small Town Hero" (song), a song by Sawyer Brown from their album This Thing Called Wantin' and Havin' It All
- Small Town Heroes, studio album by Hurray for the Riff Raff
- Small Town Hero EP, 2012 EP by English indie/ska, new tone band Heavyball
