= Six Days on the Road (album) =

Studio album by Sawyer Brown
- Released: April 15, 1997
- Recorded: 1996
- Studio: Javelina (Nashville, Tennessee); LaLa Land (Louisville, Kentucky)
- Genre: Country
- Length: 44:53
- Label: Curb
- Producer: Mac McAnally; Mark Miller

Sawyer Brown chronology
| This Thing Called Wantin' and Havin' It All (1995) | Six Days on the Road (1997) | Hallelujah, He Is Born (1997) |

Singles from Six Days on the Road
- 1. "Six Days on the Road" Released: 1997; 2. "This Night Won't Last Forever" Released: June 16, 1997

Six Days on the Road is the twelfth studio album by American country music band Sawyer Brown. It was released in 1997 on Curb Records. Its title track and lead-off single is a cover of the Dave Dudley hit from 1963. This cover reached number 13 on the Billboard country charts. Following this song was another cover, this time of "This Night Won't Last Forever", which was a pop hit for Bill LaBounty in 1978 and later for Michael Johnson in 1979. Sawyer Brown's cover was a number 6 country hit in late 1997. Also released from this album were "Another Side" and "Small Talk", both of which failed to make the country Top 40.

== Content ==
"The Nebraska Song" is a tribute to Nebraska Cornhuskers quarterback Brook Berringer, who was killed in a plane crash in 1996. The song is track number 18, the same as Berringer's jersey number. (To make this possible, tracks 13 through 17 are blank.)

== Critical reception ==
Bob Cannon of New Country magazine rated the album 3.5 stars out of 5. He wrote that the band "serve up a batch of tunes that, while never matching the emotional depth of 1992's 'All These Years', is a top-shelf collection that stresses the group's versatility." He praised the rock influences on some tracks and called "The Nebraska Song" "intimate", criticizing only the cover of "This Night Won't Last Forever" by saying that it was "as bland as the original."

== Track listing ==
1. "Another Side" (Mark Miller) – 4:11
2. "Talkin' 'bout You" (Mark Alan Springer) – 3:39
3. "This Night Won't Last Forever" (Bill LaBounty, Roy Freeland) – 3:56
4. "Six Days on the Road" (Earl Green, Carl Montgomery) – 2:53
5. "Small Talk" (Mac McAnally, Miller) – 3:42
6. "With This Ring" (McAnally) – 3:12
7. "Transistor Rodeo" (Miller) – 3:06
8. "Night and Day" (McAnally) – 3:35
9. "Half a Heart" (Gregg Hubbard, Miller) – 3:02
10. "Between You and Paradise" (Neal Coty, Springer) – 4:15
11. "A Love Like This" (Miller, Bill Shore) – 2:50
12. "Every Twist and Turn" (Hubbard, Miller) – 3:11
13. (blank track) – 0:04
14. (blank track) – 0:04
15. (blank track) – 0:04
16. (blank track) – 0:04
17. (blank track) – 0:05
18. "The Nebraska Song" (Miller) – 2:53

== Personnel ==
As listed in liner notes

=== Sawyer Brown ===
- Duncan Cameron - acoustic and electric guitars, backing vocals
- Gregg "Hobie" Hubbard - keyboards, backing vocals
- Mark Miller - lead vocals, producer
- Jim Scholten - bass guitar
- Joe Smyth - drums

=== Additional musicians ===
- Dan Dugmore - lap steel guitar
- Scott Emerick - acoustic guitar
- Paul Franklin - steel guitar
- Joe Erkman - electric guitar
- Rob Hajacos - fiddle
- Roger Hawkins - drums, percussion
- Clayton Ivey - keyboards, piano
- Mike Lawler - synthesizer
- Mac McAnally - acoustic guitar, producer
- Steve Nathan - keyboards
- Matt Rollings - piano
- Rick Vito - electric guitar, slide guitar

== Chart performance ==
| Chart (1997) | Peak position |
|---|---|
| U.S. Billboard Top Country Albums | 8 |
| U.S. Billboard 200 | 73 |
