= Round Here (disambiguation) =

"Round Here" is a song by Counting Crows.

Round Here may also refer to:

- "Round Here" (Florida Georgia Line song)
- "Round Here" (George Michael song)
- "Round Here" (Memphis Bleek song)
- "'Round Here", a song by Sawyer Brown from This Thing Called Wantin' and Havin' It All
