= Mission Temple Fireworks Stand =

Studio album by Sawyer Brown
- Released: August 23, 2005
- Studio: Sound Kitchen and Zoo Studios (Franklin, Tennessee).
- Genre: Country
- Length: 41:20
- Label: Curb
- Producer: Mark A. Miller

Sawyer Brown chronology
True Believer (2003)	Mission Temple Fireworks Stand (2005)	Best of Sawyer Brown (2008)

Professional ratings
Review scores
Source	Rating
Allmusic	link

Mission Temple Fireworks Stand is the fifteenth studio album by the American country music band Sawyer Brown. Their first studio album since Can You Hear Me Now three years previous, it produced three singles. The first of these, which was the title track, was a collaboration with Robert Randolph. Following it was "They Don't Understand", which in late 2005 became the band's first Top 40 country hit since "800 Pound Jesus" in 2000. "They Don't Understand" was also a Top 15 on the Hot Christian Songs charts. A cover of The Georgia Satellites' "Keep Your Hands to Yourself", the third single from this album, failed to chart.

== Track listing ==
No.	Title	Writer(s)	Length
1.	"Mission Temple Fireworks Stand" (featuring Robert Randolph)	Billy Maddox, Paul Thorn	3:08
2.	"Tarzan and Jane"	Steven Curtis Chapman	3:19
3.	"They Don't Understand"	Dean Chance, Teresa Chance, Steve Miller, Jeff Wood	4:17
4.	"With You Daddy"	Danny Green, Doug Johnson	4:07
5.	"Your Faith"	Mark Miller	3:40
6.	"Keep Your Hands to Yourself"	Dan Baird	2:41
7.	"Ole' Kentuck"	M. Miller, Dale Oliver	3:10
8.	"All I Want Is You"	Gregg Hubbard, M. Miller	3:55
9.	"One Little Heartbeat at a Time"	Chapman	4:06
10.	"Ladies' Man"	Chapman, M. Miller	2:48
11.	"There Was a Time"	Hubbard	2:50
12.	"Tryin' to Find (A Way to Make It Last)"	Chapman, M. Miller	3:20

== Personnel ==
Sawyer Brown

- Mark Miller – lead vocals
- Joe Erkman – rhythm guitars
- Shayne Hill – lead guitars, backing vocals
- Hobie Hubbard – keyboards, backing vocals
- Jim Scholten – bass
- Joe Smyth – drums

Youth choir on "One Little Heartbeat at a Time"

- Caleb Chapman
- Will Franklin Chapman
- Gunnar Miller
- Hunter Miller
- Madison Miller
- Logan Miller

Additional musicians

- Tim Akers – keyboards
- Bernie Herms – keyboards
- Blair Masters – keyboards
- Duncan Cameron – additional lead guitars
- John Deadrick – acoustic guitars
- Michael Hodge – guitars
- Mac McAnally – acoustic guitars
- Jerry McPherson – guitars
- Dale Oliver – guitars
- Robert Randolph – pedal steel guitar (1)
- Richard "Buck" Reed – steel guitar
- Jonathan Yudkin – mandolin
- Robert Graves – bass
- Eddie Bayers – drums, percussion
- Bobby Huff – drums, percussion
- Paul Leim – drums, percussion
- Chris McHugh – drums, percussion

== Production ==
- Mark A. Miller – producer
- Sam Hewitt – engineer
- John Lewis – engineer
- Dale Oliver – additional engineer
- J.C. Monterrosa – assistant engineer
- Jeff Balding – mixing
- David Bryant – mix assistant
- Richard Dodd – mastering
- Glenn Sweitzer – art direction, design
- Marina Chavez – photography
- Amanda Friedland – wardrobe

== Chart performance ==
Chart (2005)	Peak position
U.S. Billboard Top Country Albums	47
