= 800 Pound Jesus =

Single by Sawyer Brown

from the album Drive Me Wild
- Released: January 29, 2000
- Genre: Country
- Length: 2:54
- Label: Curb
- Songwriter(s): Billy Maddox, Paul Thorn
- Producer(s): Mark Miller, Mac McAnally

Sawyer Brown singles chronology
"I'm in Love with Her" (1999)	"800 Pound Jesus" (2000)	"Perfect World" (2000)

"800 Pound Jesus" is a song recorded by American country music group Sawyer Brown. It was released in January 2000 as the third single from the album Drive Me Wild. The song reached number 40 on the Billboard Hot Country Singles & Tracks chart. The song was written by Billy Maddox and Paul Thorn.

== Content ==
The song is about a man who purchases a statue of Jesus. He attempts to commit suicide by hanging himself, but his attempt is thwarted by landing in the statue's arms. Co-writer Paul Thorn previously recorded the song on his 1997 album Hammer and Nail; when Sawyer Brown lead singer Mark Miller heard the song on that album, he contacted Thorn and asked for permission to record it.

== History ==
In 2000, the song was nominated by the Christian Country Music Association for both Song of the Year and Video of the Year.

== Critical reception ==
Billboard published a positive review of the song, which described both Mark Miller's lead vocals and the production as "on target". The review also called the song "quirky but extremely likable" and "an amusing little ditty with a deeper message".

== Chart performance ==
Chart (2000)	Peak position
US Hot Country Songs (Billboard)	40
