= Treat Her Right (disambiguation) =

Treat Her Right is an American blues band.

Treat Her Right may also refer to:

- "Treat Her Right" (Roy Head song)
- "Treat Her Right" (Sawyer Brown song)
