= Outskirts of Town =

Studio album by Sawyer Brown
- Released: August 10, 1993
- Genre: Country
- Length: 41:22
- Label: Curb
- Producer: Mark Miller, Mac McAnally; "The Boys and Me" dance mix produced by Brian Tankersley

Sawyer Brown chronology
Cafe on the Corner (1992)	Outskirts of Town (1993)	Greatest Hits 1990–1995 (1995)

Singles from Outskirts of Town
- 1. "Thank God for You" Released: June 28, 1993; 2. "The Boys and Me" Released: October 11, 1993; 3. "Outskirts of Town" Released: February 19, 1994; 4. "Hard to Say" Released: June 20, 1994

Outskirts of Town is the 10th studio album by American country music band Sawyer Brown, released in 1993 on Curb Records. The third and final album of their career to receive RIAA gold certification, it produced four hit singles on the Billboard country charts: "Thank God for You" (the band's third and final number one), "The Boys and Me" (number four), the title track (number 40), and "Hard to Say" (number 5). A dance mix of "The Boys and Me" is also included as a bonus track.

== Track listing ==
No.	Title	Writer(s)	Length
1.	"The Boys and Me"	Mac McAnally, Mark Miller	3:23
2.	"Farmer Tan"	Gregg Hubbard, Miller	4:07
3.	"Outskirts of Town"	Duncan Cameron, Hubbard	3:41
4.	"Thank God for You"	McAnally, Miller	3:18
5.	"Listenin' for You"	Hubbard, Miller	2:56
6.	"Eyes of Love"	Cameron, Hubbard, Miller	3:06
7.	"Hard to Say"	Miller	3:24
8.	"Drive Away"	Miller, Bill LaBounty	3:47
9.	"Heartbreak Highway"	Miller, John Flannigan	2:34
10.	"Love to Be Wanted"	Miller, Bill Shore	2:31
11.	"Hold On"	Hubbard	3:30
12.	"The Boys and Me (Dance Remix)"	McAnally, Miller	5:05

== Personnel ==
Sawyer Brown

- Duncan Cameron – electric, acoustic and resonator guitars, mandolin, backing vocals
- Gregg "Hobie" Hubbard – keyboards, background vocals
- Mark Miller – lead vocals, producer
- Jim Scholten – bass guitar
- Joe "Curley" Smyth – drums, percussion

Additional musicians

- Eddie Bayers – drums
- Sam Bush – mandolin
- Roger Hawkins – drums, percussion
- James Hooker – keyboards
- Roy Huskey Jr. – upright bass
- Mike Lawler – synthesizer
- Mac McAnally – acoustic guitar, producer
- Terry McMillan – harmonica
- Dana McVicker – duet vocals on "Drive Away"
- JayDee Maness – pedal steel guitar
- Matt Rollings – piano

== Chart performance ==
=== Weekly charts ===
Chart (1993)	Peak position
Canadian Country Albums (RPM)	2
US Billboard 200	81
US Top Country Albums (Billboard)	13

=== Year-end charts ===
Chart (1993)	Position
US Top Country Albums (Billboard)	75
Chart (1994)	Position
US Top Country Albums (Billboard)	62

== Certifications ==
Region	Certification	Certified units/sales
Canada (Music Canada)	Gold	50,000^{^}
United States (RIAA)	Gold	500,000^{^}
^{^} Shipments figures based on certification alone.
