= Back Where I Come From =

Single by Mac McAnally

from the album Simple Life
- B-side: "Company Time"
- Released: January 1990
- Recorded: 1990
- Genre: Country
- Length: 3:32
- Label: Warner Bros.
- Songwriter: Mac McAnally
- Producers: Jim Ed Norman, Mac McAnally

Mac McAnally singles chronology
"Minimum Love" (1983)	"Back Where I Come From" (1990)	"Down the Road" (1990)

"Back Where I Come From" is a song written and recorded by American country music artist Mac McAnally. It was released in January 1990 as the first single from his album Simple Life. The song reached number 14 on the Billboard Hot Country Singles & Tracks chart. Its B-side, "Company Time", was later a single for Linda Davis in 1994. "Back Where I Come From" was also recorded by Kenny Chesney in 1996.

== Content ==
The song is a mid-tempo in which the narrator expresses nostalgia towards his hometown in Mississippi. Regarding its content, McAnally told American Songwriter, "When I wrote 'Back Where I Come From' I thought that it was a hit, but also that it said something that I personally wanted to be the first to say." The song, the first cut on Simple Life, has a play length of 3 minutes and 32 seconds; a 1-minute and 20 second reprise, performed by McAnally on piano with backing from the Nashville String Machine, is the album's sixth track.

== Cover versions ==
"Back Where I Come From" was covered by Kenny Chesney on his 1996 album Me and You, produced by Barry Beckett. Chesney also included a live version of the song on his 2000 Greatest Hits album. Of Chesney's recordings, McAnally said that "As a publisher I knew I was devaluing the copyright by singing it myself instead of passing it onto better and bigger singers, but I did it anyway. One of many of my classically bad business choices, but thankfully Kenny Chesney was kind enough to bail me out and cut it again." Although it was not released as a single, Chesney's rendition has been certified gold by the Recording Industry Association of America (RIAA).

== Personnel (Mac McAnally) ==
From Simple Life liner notes.

- Eddie Bayers - drums
- Vince Gill - background vocals
- Mac McAnally - vocals, acoustic guitar, electric guitar, keyboards
- "The Mississippi Choir" (Tammy Wynette, J. Fred Knobloch, Tricia Walker, Johnny Crocker, Mark Gray) - background vocals
- Steve Nathan - keyboards
- Mark O'Connor - fiddle
- Tom Roady - percussion
- Leland Sklar - bass guitar

== Chart performance (Mac McAnally) ==
Chart (1990)	Peak position
Canada Country Singles (RPM)	18
US Hot Country Songs (Billboard)	14

== Certifications (Kenny Chesney) ==
Region	Certification	Certified units/sales
United States (RIAA)	Gold	500,000^{‡}
^{‡} Sales+streaming figures based on certification alone.
