= Word of Mouth (Mac McAnally album) =

Studio album by Mac McAnally
- Released: June 1, 1999
- Genre: Country
- Length: 33:59
- Label: DreamWorks Nashville
- Producer: Mac McAnally

Mac McAnally chronology
Knots (1994)	Word of Mouth (1999)	Semi-True Stories (2004)

Professional ratings
Review scores
Source	Rating
AllMusic	3/5 stars

Word of Mouth is the ninth studio album by American country music singer Mac McAnally. It was released by DreamWorks Nashville in 1999.

== Content ==
Restless Heart covered "Looking Back" on their 2004 album Still Restless, which McAnally co-produced.

== Critical reception ==
Heather Phares of AllMusic says, "Mac McAnally's Word of Mouth features the singer/songwriter/producer/arranger's multiple talents in effect." Geoffrey Himes of The Washington Post writes, "Mac McAnally makes such a good living in Nashville writing songs and playing sessions for the likes of Jimmy Buffett, Sawyer Brown, Steve Wariner and Randy Travis that he doesn't have to rely on his own albums to support himself. So when he gets around to releasing the occasional album (this is his first in five years), he needn't worry about trying to please country radio. Instead he indulges his yen for left-field genre exercises and more personal songs, as on his latest release, Word of Mouth." Jon Weisberge of Country Standard Time states that "it's easy to see why McAnally has enjoyed only intermittent success as a solo artist: he doesn't fit easily into any category. If you like well-crafted, polished songs in a variety of styles, though, this fits the bill."

== Track listing ==
All tracks are written by Mac McAnally, unless otherwise noted.

No.	Title	Writer(s)	Length
1.	"Looking Back"		3:30
2.	"Cold Day in Hell"		3:12
3.	"Things to Do Today"		3:50
4.	"The Ass and the Hole" (featuring the Coral Reefer Band)		2:44
5.	"Pop Top Hop"		4:09
6.	"Better than the Good Old Days"	Mac McAnally; Alan Schulman	3:23
7.	"Out the Window"		3:13
8.	"The Way It Goes"		4:09
9.	"Just One Forever" (featuring Bryan White)	Mac McAnally; Bryan White	2:50
10.	"Against the Odds"		2:59
Total length:			33:59

== Personnel ==
Adapted from Word of Mouth liner notes.

Musicians

- Richard Bennett – electric guitar (1, 3, 4, 6, 9), acoustic guitar (2, 7, 8)
- Duncan Cameron – electric guitar (2, 3)
- Chad Cromwell – drums (1–4, 6, 7, 9)
- Stuart Duncan – fiddle (1, 2, 4, 6–9), mandolin (3)
- Roger Guth – drums (5, 10)
- John Lovell – muted trumpet (5)
- Jim Mayer – bass guitar (5, 10)
- Mac McAnally – acoustic guitar (1–4, 6, 7, 9), acoustic fingerstyle guitar (9), slide guitar (1), piano (1, 2, 5, 6, 8, 10), percussion (1), vibraphone (5), electric guitar (4, 6, 7, 8), electric piano (6, 10), 12-string guitar (10), gut string guitar (10)
- Steve Nathan – keyboards (1, 2, 4, 6–9), Wurlitzer electric piano (3), organ (4)
- Peter Mayer – electric guitar (5, 10)
- Tom Roady – percussion (1–4, 6–9)
- Steuart Smith – electric guitar (1–4, 6–9)
- James Stroud – drums (8)
- Greg "Fingers" Taylor – harmonica (3)
- Glenn Worf – bass guitar (1–4, 6–9)

Vocals

- Coral Reefer Band (Peter Mayer, Jim Mayer, Tina Gullickson, Nadirah Shakoor, Michael Utley) – 4
- Derek George – 9
- Mac McAnally – 1, 3, 4, 6, 7, 9
- Kim Richey – 6, 7
- Harry Stinson – 2, 4, 6, 7
- Bryan White – 9

Technical

- Eric Conn – digital editing
- Tyler Gish – assistant
- Steve Lowery – assistant
- Mac McAnally – producer
- Denny Purcell – mastering
- Alan Schulman – recording, mixing
- Chris Stone – assistant
