= Minimum Love =

1983 single by Mac McAnally

Single by Mac McAnally

from the album Nothing But the Truth
- B-side: "Like Your Mother"
- Released: 1983
- Genre: Soft rock
- Length: 3:14
- Label: Geffen Records
- Songwriter(s): Jerry Wexler; Mac McAnally
- Producer(s): Clayton Ivey; Terry Woodford

Mac McAnally singles chronology
"How Cool" (1983)	"Minimum Love" (1983)	"History" (1986)

"Minimum Love" is a song by American singer-songwriter Mac McAnally. It was released as a single in 1983 from his album Nothing But the Truth.

The song narrowly missed the Top 40 on the Billboard Hot 100, peaking at No. 41. However, it was a Top 10 Adult Contemporary hit in both the United States and Canada.

== Reception ==
Some music critics have stated that McAnally had a voice similar to that of James Taylor. McAnally admitted it in an interview with Orange Coast, stating it was accidental.

== Chart performance ==
Chart (1983)	Peak position
U.S. Billboard Hot 100	41
U.S. Billboard Adult Contemporary	7
U.S. R&R Adult Contemporary	6
Canada RPM Adult Contemporary Tracks	5
