= Simple Life (Mac McAnally album) =

Studio album by Mac McAnally
- Released: February 13, 1990
- Recorded: 1989
- Genre: Country
- Length: 38:16
- Label: Warner Bros. Nashville
- Producer: Jim Ed Norman; Mac McAnally

Mac McAnally chronology
Finish Lines (1988)	Simple Life (1990)	Live and Learn (1992)

Simple Life is a studio album by American country music singer Mac McAnally. It was released in 1990 by Warner Bros. Records Nashville.

== Content ==
The album includes McAnally's only solo single to reach Top 40 on the Hot Country Songs charts, "Back Where I Come From", which peaked at No. 14 in 1990. The album's only other single, "Down the Road", peaked at No. 70. Kenny Chesney and McAnally recorded "Down the Road" as a duet on the former's Lucky Old Sun album, and this version was a No. 1 single in 2009. Chesney had previously recorded "Back Where I Come From" on his 1996 album Me and You, and included a live version on his 2000 Greatest Hits package.

Linda Davis covered "Company Time", the B-side of "Back Where I Come From", on her 1994 album Shoot for the Moon, and her version was a No. 43 country single that year. Also, Sammy Kershaw released "Southbound" as a single from his 1994 album Feelin' Good Train, taking the song to No. 27 on the country charts that year. Finally, Andy Childs covered the title track on his 1993 self-titled debut, taking it to No. 61 that year.

== Critical reception ==
Rating it 3 out of 5 stars, Michael McCall of Allmusic wrote that "The album features well-crafted lyrics, fastidious acoustic-pop arrangements and his unremarkable voice." A review in Cash Box was positive, saying that McAnally "makes the 'simple life' seem so intriguing, as he touches on every aspect of life" and "delights us with his own style of singing and musical accompaniment".

== Track listing ==
All songs written by Mac McAnally

No.	Title	Length
1.	"Back Where I Come From"	3:32
2.	"Simple Life"	2:58
3.	"Same Old Heart"	3:23
4.	"She's All I've Got Going"	3:34
5.	"Down the Road"	2:57
6.	"Back Where I Come From (Reprise)"	1:20
7.	"The Invisible Man"	3:02
8.	"Mobile Home"	3:33
9.	"Just That Way"	3:08
10.	"She's Going Out of My Mind"	3:29
11.	"Company Time"	3:31
12.	"Southbound"	3:49
