= Can You Hear Me Now =

Studio album by Sawyer Brown
- Released: July 11, 2002
- Studio: GBT Studio (Nashville, Tennessee).
- Genre: Country
- Length: 37:44
- Label: Curb
- Producer: Brian Tankersley

Sawyer Brown chronology
The Hits Live (2000)	Can You Hear Me Now (2002)	True Believer (2003)

Professional ratings
Review scores
Source	Rating
Allmusic	2.5/5 stars
Country Weekly	(not rated)
Dallas Morning News	B

Can You Hear Me Now is the fourteenth studio album by the American country music band Sawyer Brown. It was released in 2002 on Curb Records. The album's singles all failed to make Top 40 on the Hot Country Songs charts: "Circles" reached #45, the title track peaked at #47, and "I Need a Girlfriend" failed to chart. After the release of this album, the band recorded three new tracks for a religious-themed compilation, then left Curb for Lyric Street Records, where they released the #48-peaking "I'll Be Around" but no album. They would return to Curb in 2005 for the release of their fifteenth album, 2005's Mission Temple Fireworks Stand.

== Track listing ==
1. "Can You Hear Me Now" (Mark Miller, Dave Loggins) – 3:41
2. "I Need a Girlfriend" (Miller, Loggins) – 3:45
3. "Circles" (Loggins, Marv Green) – 3:33
4. "Where Was I" (Billy Maddox, Paul Thorn, Anne Graham) – 3:53
5. "Hard Hard World" (Jamie Hartford) – 2:54
6. "She's an I've Got to Have You Girl" (Miller, Loggins) – 3:53
7. "When the Sun Don't Always Shine" (Miller, Gregg Hubbard) – 2:54
8. "Someone" (Bill LaBounty, Rick Chudacoff) – 4:01
9. "Come Back Baby" (Miller) – 3:35
10. "I Got a Plan" (Miller, Loggins) – 5:35

== Personnel ==
Sawyer Brown

- Mark Miller – lead vocals
- Gregg "Hobie" Hubbard – keyboards, backing vocals
- Duncan Cameron – lead guitars, backing vocals
- Jim Scholten – bass
- Joe "Curley" Smyth – drums

Additional musicians

- Bernie Herms – keyboards, acoustic piano
- Blair Masters – keyboards
- Brian Tankersley – keyboards
- Joe Erkman – acoustic guitar
- Dale Oliver – electric guitar
- Pete Stewart – electric guitar
- Bobby Terry – acoustic guitar
- Paul Leim – drums, percussion
- Jimmy Myers – percussion
- Larry Franklin – fiddle
- Terry McMillan – harmonica
- Dave Loggins – backing vocals

== Production ==
- Mark A. Miller – producer
- Brian Tankersley – producer, recording, mixing
- Julian King – mixing
- Jake Burns – recording assistant, mix assistant
- Richard Hanson – recording assistant, mix assistant
- Sam Hewitt – recording assistant, mix assistant
- Hank Williams – mastering at MasterMix (Nashville, Tennessee)
- Glenn Sweitzer – art direction, design
- Russ Harrington – photography
- Claudia Fowler – wardrobe
- Melissa Schleicher – hair stylist, make-up

== Chart performance ==
Chart (2002)	Peak position
U.S. Billboard Top Country Albums	39
