= Down the Road (Mac McAnally song) =

1990 single by Mac McAnally

Single by Mac McAnally

from the album Simple Life
- B-side: "She's Going Out of My Mind"
- Released: June 1990
- Genre: Country
- Length: 2:42
- Label: Warner Bros.
- Songwriter: Mac McAnally
- Producers: Jim Ed Norman; Mac McAnally

Mac McAnally singles chronology
"Back Where I Come From" (1990)	"Down the Road" (1990)	"Live and Learn" (1992)

"Down the Road" is a song written and recorded by American country music artist Mac McAnally. McAnally has charted with the song on two separate occasions. The first of these two versions was released as the second single from his 1990 album Simple Life, and was a minor chart single for him that year. Eighteen years later, McAnally re-recorded the song as a duet with Kenny Chesney on Chesney's 2008 album Lucky Old Sun. This rendition is also McAnally's highest charting country hit, having reached Number One in February 2009.

== Content ==
"Down the Road" is a mid-tempo ballad. In it, the male narrator describes his childhood love interest — a girl who lives down the road from him. Eventually, the narrator proposes to marry her, only to find out the expectations her parents have of him.

In the second verse, the narrator is now an adult, and his daughter has a love interest who lives down the road. He then explains that he has the same expectations that his in-laws once had of him, but he will still let her go down the road.

According to Country Weekly magazine, McAnally was inspired to write the song one Christmas morning after thinking about what his two daughters' lives would be like in the future (he has since had a third).

== Mac McAnally version ==
Mac McAnally's original version is the second single from his 1990 album Simple Life, his only album for Warner Bros. Records. It peaked at No. 70 on the Hot Country Songs charts. McAnally later released it on his 1994 album Knots.

=== Music video ===
McAnally's rendition also features a music video, directed by John Lloyd Miller. It features McAnally performing the song on a porch while playing electric guitar.

=== Chart positions ===
Chart (1990)	Peak position
Canada Country Singles (RPM)	73
US Hot Country Songs (Billboard)	70

== Kenny Chesney version ==
"Down the Road"

Single by Kenny Chesney and Mac McAnally

from the album Lucky Old Sun
- Released: November 10, 2008
- Recorded: 2008
- Genre: Country
- Length: 3:01
- Label: Blue Chair/BNA
- Songwriter: Mac McAnally
- Producers: Buddy Cannon; Kenny Chesney

Kenny Chesney singles chronology
"Everybody Wants to Go to Heaven" (2008)	"Down the Road" (2008)	"Out Last Night" (2009)

Mac McAnally singles chronology
"Not That Long Ago" (1993)	"Down the Road" (2008)	"You First" (2009)

In 2008, Kenny Chesney covered the song on his album Lucky Old Sun. Chesney's version features guest vocals from McAnally, who sings the second verse and chorus. Unlike McAnally's original which is accompanied by electric guitar, Chesney's rendition is more acoustic in nature, featuring only accompaniment from two steel-string acoustic guitars and congas. According to McAnally, the song "was not supposed to be a duet", but he agreed to record it as a duet on Chesney's album. Chesney and McAnally were nominated for the Grammy Award for Best Country Collaboration with Vocals on December 2, 2009.

=== Composition ===
The Chesney and McAnally duet version is set in cut time in the key of E major. It has a moderate tempo and a main chord pattern of E-B-A-B. Chesney and McAnally's vocals range from B3-C♯5.

=== Reception ===
==== Critical ====
Chesney's rendition received a "thumbs-up" rating from The 9513. Critic Jim Malec said that the song "provid[ed] him a comfortable pocket from which he can weave a tale" and added, "'Down The Road' brings together the best of Chesney with the best of McAnally, a songwriter whose greatest strength is his ability to breath [sic] life into characters that seem unquestionably real, and which help us discuss life’s essential and often bittersweet truths." He also said that it was Chesney's "best vocal performance in years". Jacob Crogie of 411 Mania gave the Chesney version a four-out-of-five rating, saying "This re-recording is a classic example of good country! It's got some solid musicality and is acoustic based to suit the subject matter. McAnally's writing provides solid, believable, sympathetic characters which allows the listener to connect to the song emotionally."

==== Chart positions ====
Chesney's version of the song made its chart debut at number 59 on the country charts dated for November 1, 2008. It fell from the charts the next week, then re-entered at number 38 for the week of November 15. It is McAnally's second Top 40 country chart entry, eighteen years after his previous one, the number 14 "Back Where I Come From" in 1990. The duet version reached number one on the country chart dated for February 28, 2009, giving Chesney his sixteenth Number One and McAnally his first, and to date, only Number One.

Weekly chart performance
Chart (2008–2009)	Peak position
US Hot Country Songs (Billboard)	1
US Billboard Hot 100	47
Canada Country (Billboard)	1
Canada Hot 100 (Billboard)	57

=== Year-end charts ===
Annual chart rankings
Chart (2009)	Position
US Country Songs (Billboard)	30
US Radio Songs (Billboard)	82

=== Certifications ===
Region	Certification	Certified units/sales
United States (RIAA)	Gold	500,000^{‡}
^{‡} Sales+streaming figures based on certification alone.

== Cover Versions ==
Dennis Agajanian recorded "Down the Road" for his 1992 album "Out of the Wilderness", and included it again on his 1994 album "Best Picks".
