= Seminole (duo) =

American country music duo

- Origin: Florida
- Genre: Country
- Years active: 1997–1998
- Label: Curb/Universal
- Past members: Jimmy Myers; Donald "Butch" Myers

Seminole was an American country music duo from Florida composed of brothers Jimmy Myers and Donald "Butch" Myers. The duo got their start performing at the Cypress Lounge in Bunnell, Florida. They made their way to Nashville after slipping a demo tape to Mark Miller, the lead singer of Sawyer Brown.

Their debut single, "She Knows Me by Heart", was released by Curb/Universal on August 12, 1997. It peaked at number 69 on the Billboard Hot Country Singles & Tracks chart.

== Discography ==
=== Singles ===
Year	Single	Peak positions
Year	Single	US Country
1997	"She Knows Me by Heart"	69
1997	"Hillbilly Town"	—
1998	"What Am I Gonna Do (With All This Love)"	—
"—" denotes releases that did not chart

=== Music videos ===
Year	Video	Director
1997	"Hillbilly Town"	Michael Salomon
1998	"What Am I Gonna Do (With All This Love)"	Trey Fanjoy
