= Drive Me Wild =

Studio album by Sawyer Brown
- Released: March 2, 1999
- Genre: Country
- Length: 36:23
- Label: Curb
- Producer: Mac McAnally; Mark Miller

Sawyer Brown chronology
Hallelujah, He Is Born (1997)	Drive Me Wild (1999)	The Hits Live (2000)

Drive Me Wild is the thirteenth studio album by the American country music band Sawyer Brown. It was released on March 2, 1999 on the Curb Records label. The album produced three singles on the Billboard country charts: the title track at #6, "I'm in Love with Her" at #47, and "800 Pound Jesus" at #40.

== Track listing ==
No.	Title	Writer(s)	Length
1.	"Break My Heart Again"	Marc Jordan, Stephan Moccio	3:30
2.	"We're Everything to Me"	Mark Miller, Gregg Hubbard, Mike Lawler	3:14
3.	"I'm in Love with Her"	Chuck Cannon, Allen Shamblin	3:32
4.	"Drive Me Wild"	Miller, Hubbard, Lawler	3:35
5.	"Moon over Miami"	Scotty Emerick, Miller	3:57
6.	"All Wound Up"	Mac McAnally	2:47
7.	"800 Pound Jesus"	Billy Maddox, Paul Thorn	2:54
8.	"It All Comes Down to Love"	Cannon	3:05
9.	"Every Little Thing"	Emerick, John Scott Sherrill	2:47
10.	"Playin' a Love Song"	Hubbard, Miller	3:34
11.	"Soul Searchin'"	Miller, Lawler, Anthony Crawford	3:28

== Personnel ==
Sawyer Brown

- Mark Miller – lead vocals
- Gregg "Hobie" Hubbard – keyboards, backing vocals
- Duncan Cameron – lead guitars, backing vocals
- Jim Scholton – bass
- Joe "Curley" Smyth – drums

Additional musicians

- Mike Lawler – synthesizers
- Blair Masters – keyboards
- Steve Nathan – keyboards
- Bob Patin – acoustic piano
- Matt Rollings – acoustic piano
- Pete Wasner – keyboards
- Scotty Emerick – acoustic guitar
- Derek George – electric guitar
- Mac McAnally – acoustic guitar
- Randy Scruggs – acoustic guitar
- Lee Hendricks – bass
- David Hood – bass
- Eddie Bayers – drums
- Taz Bentley – drums
- Roger Hawkins – drums, percussion
- Paul Leim – drums, percussion
- Lynn Williams – drums
- Jimmy Myers – percussion
- Robert Greenidge – steel drums
- Doug Henry – woodwinds
- Stuart Duncan – fiddle
- John Catchings – cello
- Kristin Wilkinson – viola
- David Davidson – violin
- Connie Heard – violin
- Bob Bailey – backing vocals
- Lisa Cochran – backing vocals
- Vicki Hampton – backing vocals
- Buddy Ross – backing vocals
- Bryan White – backing vocals

== Production ==
- Mark A. Miller – producer
- Mac McAnally – producer
- Alan Schulman – recording, mixing
- Brian Tankersley – recording, mixing
- Bob Blesius – additional recording
- Chris Acton – recording assistant
- Tyler Gish – recording assistant, mix assistant
- Sandy Jenkins – recording assistant, mix assistant
- Steve Lowery – recording assistant, mix assistant
- Rich Schrimer – recording assistant, mix assistant
- Chris Stone – recording assistant, mix assistant
- Craig White – recording assistant, mix assistant
- Denny Purcell – mastering
- Monica Mercer – art direction, design
- Dean Dixon – photography

== Chart performance ==
=== Weekly charts ===
Chart (1999)	Peak position
Canadian Country Albums (RPM)	9
US Billboard 200	99
US Top Country Albums (Billboard)	10

=== Year-end charts ===
Chart (1999)	Position
US Top Country Albums (Billboard)	71
