= Brook Berringer =

American football player (1973–1996)

- Berringer in his football uniform in 1993
- Born: Brook Warren Berringer; July 9, 1973; Scottsbluff, Nebraska, U.S.
- Died: April 18, 1996 (aged 22); Raymond, Nebraska, U.S.
- Resting place: Goodland Cemetery; Goodland, Kansas, U.S.
- Height: 6 ft 3.5 in (191.8 cm)

Brook Warren Berringer (July 9, 1973 – April 18, 1996) was an American quarterback for the Nebraska Cornhuskers football team in the mid-1990s. Berringer came to Nebraska from Goodland, Kansas and played a backup role to Tommie Frazier. He was best known for replacing the injured Frazier during the 1994 season and leading the Cornhuskers to seven consecutive wins and to the Orange Bowl national championship game against the University of Miami Hurricanes.

Berringer died in a plane crash just two days before the 1996 NFL draft.

== Early life ==
Berringer was born in Scottsbluff, Nebraska. When Berringer was seven years old, his father died from cancer. He lived with his mother and two sisters in Goodland, Kansas. Throughout his childhood, he played several different sports.

== College career ==
=== Freshman and sophomore seasons ===
Because of his successful high-school career, Berringer was recruited by many Big 8 schools, ultimately committing to the University of Nebraska–Lincoln. In his freshman and sophomore seasons (1992 and 1993), he appeared in 15 games in a backup role.

=== Junior season ===
In 1994 as a junior, Berringer started seven games because starter Tommie Frazier had a blood clot in his leg. Berringer completed 94 of 151 passes (62%) for 1,295 yards, 10 touchdowns and five interceptions. Prior to that year, Berringer had completed only 17 passes. Frazier recovered in time to start the Orange Bowl. In the game's first quarter, Frazier threw an interception on Nebraska's second series. Berringer replaced Frazier and threw a 19-yard touchdown pass to Mark Gilman that drew the Huskers within three points. Nebraska eventually won the game 24–17, with Berringer playing through the middle quarters before coach Tom Osborne reinserted Frazier in the fourth quarter.

=== Senior season ===
As a senior, Berringer again was a backup. He played sparingly, completing 26 of 51 passes for 252 yards in nine games played. For the third consecutive year, the Cornhuskers played in the national championship game, the Fiesta Bowl. Berringer played at the end of the 62–24 blowout game, scoring a one-yard touchdown for Nebraska's final points in the win over Florida.

Pre-draft measurables
Height	Weight	Arm length	Hand span	40-yard dash	10-yard split	20-yard split	20-yard shuttle	Vertical jump
6 ft 3 1/2 in (1.92 m)	218 lb (99 kg)	34 in (0.86 m)	9 5/8 in (0.24 m)	4.69 s	1.66 s	2.74 s	4.13 s	33.0 in (0.84 m)

== Plane crash ==
Despite having spent most of his college career as a backup, Berringer had shown enough promise that he was expected to be selected in the 1996 NFL draft. However, he was killed in an airplane accident just two days before the draft. A private pilot, Berringer was in control of a 1946 Piper Cub over Raymond, Nebraska when the aircraft crashed in an alfalfa field. The National Transportation Safety Board ruled the probable cause to be a partially closed fuel valve, resulting in fuel starvation, engine failure and loss of control. Berringer's friend Tobey Lake, the brother of Berringer's girlfriend Tiffini, was also killed in the crash.

A memorial service for Berringer was held before a crowd of 48,659 on April 20 at Memorial Stadium before the start of the annual Red-White Spring football game. Berringer is interred at Goodland Cemetery in Goodland, Kansas.

== Legacy ==
The country group Sawyer Brown recorded "The Nebraska Song" in tribute to Berringer. (The song was actually written before his death.) The song appears as Track 18 (the same number as Berringer's jersey) on the group's 1997 album Six Days on the Road, and its first live performance was at the Devaney Center on the University of Nebraska campus during the 1997 Nebraska State Fair. Sawyer Brown lead vocalist Mark Miller was a pallbearer at Berringer's funeral.

Following Berringer's death, the Nebraska Cornhuskers football program established the Brook Berringer Citizenship Team in his honor. Awarded annually before the Spring Game, the Brook Berringer Citizenship Team recognizes Cornhuskers football players for leadership, involvement and service.

A trophy case dedicated to Berringer is located in the lobby of Goodland High School's Max Jones Fieldhouse. In 2006, the University of Nebraska erected a life-size bronze statue of Berringer with coach Tom Osborne.

== See also ==
- Albert Scott Crossfield
- Jessica Dubroff
- John F. Kennedy Jr. Piper Saratoga crash
- John T. Walton
- Paul Wellstone
- List of gridiron football players who died during their careers
