= Nothing but the Truth (Mac McAnally album) =

Studio album by Mac McAnally
- Released: 1983
- Studio: Wishbone Recording Studio
- Genre: Pop rock, soft rock
- Label: Geffen
- Producer: Clayton Ivey; Terry Woodford

Mac McAnally chronology
Cuttin' Corners (1980)	Nothing but the Truth (1983)	Finish Lines (1988)

Singles from Nothing but the Truth
- 1. "How Cool" Released: 1983; 2. "Minimum Love" Released: 1983

Nothing But the Truth is the fourth album by American singer Mac McAnally, released in 1983 on Geffen Records.

The album failed to chart. The single "Minimum Love" narrowly missed the top 40 on the Billboard Hot 100, peaking at No. 41. However, it was a top 10 hit on the Adult Contemporary chart, peaking at No. 7.

== Content and history ==
McAnally wrote the songs for the album over the course of two years. During this timespan, he also became a father for the first time, and his own father died as well. Keith Tuber of Orange Coast thought that the album reflected a theme of "compromise" given McAnally's life experiences leading up to its release. He also thought that it had a "fuller" sound than McAnally's previous works.

== Track listing ==
All songs are written by Mac McAnally, except where noted.

No.	Title	Writer(s)	Length
1.	"How Cool"		3:42
2.	"Middle Man"		3:43
3.	"On the Line"	Donny Lowery; McAnally	4:03
4.	"Minimum Love"	Jerry Wexler; McAnally	3:14
5.	"Lookin' for the Good Life"		3:44

No.	Title	Length
6.	"Like Your Mother"	3:31
7.	"The City"	3:17
8.	"Nothin' but the Truth"	3:44
9.	"Other People Say"	3:19
10.	"Dark Ages"	4:11

== Personnel ==
- Mac McAnally – lead vocals, guitar, keyboards, bass guitar
- David Hood, David Hungate – bass guitar
- Roger Hawkins, James Stroud – drums
- Hugh McCracken, John Willis, Duncan Cameron, Kenny Mims – guitar
- Tom Roady – percussion
- Clayton Ivey – keyboards
- Brandon Barnes, Steve Nathan – synthesizer
- Randall Bramblett – horns
- Lenny LeBlanc – backing vocals
- Mike Cunningham – backing vocals
- Robert Byrne – backing vocals
- Sarah McAnally – backing vocals
- Terry Woodford – backing vocals

Production

- Clayton Ivey, Terry Woodford – production
- Terry Woodford, Steve Melton, Alan Schulman, Lee Daley, Mary Beth McLemore – engineering
