= Cafe on the Corner =

Studio album by Sawyer Brown
- Released: August 25, 1992
- Studio: Music Mill (Nashville, Tennessee); Scruggs Sound (Berry Hill, Tennessee)
- Genre: Country
- Length: 30:55
- Label: Curb
- Producer: Mark Miller; Randy Scruggs

Sawyer Brown chronology
The Dirt Road (1992)	Cafe on the Corner (1992)	Outskirts of Town (1993)

Singles from Cafe on the Corner
- 1. "Cafe on the Corner" Released: August 3, 1992; 2. "All These Years" Released: November 23, 1992; 3. "Trouble on the Line" Released: March 22, 1993

Professional ratings
Review scores
Source	Rating
Allmusic	link

Cafe on the Corner is the ninth studio album by American country music band Sawyer Brown. Released in 1992 by Curb Records, it produced three singles on the Billboard country music charts: the title track, "All These Years", and "Trouble on the Line". "All These Years", previously recorded by writer Mac McAnally on his 1992 album Live and Learn.

== Track listing ==
No.	Title	Writer(s)	Length
1.	"Cafe on the Corner"	Mac McAnally	3:23
2.	"Trouble on the Line"	Mark Miller, Bill Shore	2:31
3.	"All These Years"	McAnally	3:20
4.	"Travelin' Shoes"	Miller, Gregg Hubbard	2:59
5.	"A Different Tune"	Miller, Hubbard	3:01
6.	"Lesson in Love"	Miller, Hubbard, Duncan Cameron	2:32
7.	"Chain of Love"	Miller, Hubbard	2:25
8.	"Homestead in My Heart"	Cameron, Michael Mikulka	3:52
9.	"I Kept My Motor Runnin'" (featuring Donna McElroy)	Miller, Hubbard, Randy Scruggs	2:55
10.	"Sister's Got a New Tattoo"	Miller, Hubbard	3:57

== Personnel ==
Sawyer Brown

- Duncan Cameron – Dobro, acoustic guitar, electric guitar, steel guitar, backing vocals
- Gregg "Hobie" Hubbard – keyboards, backing vocals
- Mark Miller – lead vocals
- Jim Scholten – bass guitar
- Joe "Curley" Smyth – drums, percussion

Additional Musicians

- Bob Bailey – background vocals
- John Catchings – cello on "All These Years"
- David Davidson – violin on "All These Years"
- Vicki Hampton – background vocals
- Mac McAnally – background vocals
- Donna McElroy – background vocals on "I Kept My Motor Runnin'"
- Edgar Meyer – string arrangements on "All These Years"
- Clara Olson – violin on "All These Years"
- Kris Wilkinson – viola on "All These Years"

== Chart performance ==
Chart (1992)	Peak position
U.S. Billboard Top Country Albums	23
U.S. Billboard 200	117
Canadian RPM Country Albums	10
