= Heavyball =

- Origin: London, England
- Genres: Ska, MOD, Indie
- Years active: November 2011-December 2025
- Labels: Magnetic North Melodies
- Website: www.heavyball.net

Heavyball were an indie/ska, new tone band based in London.

== Biography ==
Heavyball were formed in November 2011 by Nottingham brothers Matt (guitar and vocals) and Habs (Drums) Salisbury and school friend Johnny 'Iball' Eveson (bass). Their break came after a chance meeting between their manager and manager of Kaiser Chiefs, Mick Webster. Mick encouraged them to record their first EP Small Town Hero in Huddersfield with Embrace's former producer Dave Creffield. Small Town Hero received airplay on BBC Ulster's Gerry Anderson Show and by BBC Radio Nottingham's Dean Jackson as part of the BBC Introducing program.

In February 2013, Heavyball supported Kaiser Chiefs on their UK tour, including Kaiser Chiefs' warm up shows in Rotterdam and Utrecht.

Along with Kaiser Chiefs, Heavyball have played with various artists of note including The Selector and The Beat and other artists of note including Dodgy, The Cribs and Geno Washington.

Heavyball released their second EP Hands Up in March 2013, and the tracks "Lost Heroes" and "Hands Up" were played on BBC London's Gary Crowley Show. "Hands Up" was also played as part of BBC DJ Tom Robinson's mixtape.

At the beginning of 2014 they signed to the independent record label Magnetic North Melodies.

Heavyball have played many UK shows and festivals including the TT races and the Strawberry Fields Festival. The band have played several times across Europe including France, Germany, Switzerland, Austria and the Czech Republic. Heavyball have found particular success in the Netherlands, appearing at festivals such as Welcome to the Village.

They released their first album, Black Eye Diaries, in October 2015. The 2017 follow-up When Can You Start? enjoyed success in Europe, peaking at number 2 in the Austrian Indie charts in January 2018.

In May 2018, the band were recognised by the British Phonographic Industry with a Music Export Growth Scheme grant to support their growing popularity in mainland Europe.

== Band members ==
- Matt 'Bigface' Salisbury - lead vocals/guitar (2011–2025)
- Habs - drums, backing vocals (2011–2025)
- Johnny Eveson - bass guitar, backing vocals (2011–2025)
- Tom 'Stone Cold' Frost - guitar (2014–2025)

== Discography ==
=== Small Town Hero EP ===
1. "Automatic Hit Machine" (2:39)
2. "I Confess" (3:49)
3. "Small Town Hero" (3:47)

Released June 2012

=== Hands Up EP ===
1. "Hands Up" (3:08)
2. "Lost Heroes" (3:21)
3. "Wanted" (3:00)

Released March 2013

=== Black Eye Friday EP ===
1. "Black Eye Friday" (3:16)

Released January 2014

=== Another Country EP ===
1. "Another Country" (2:59)
2. "Unhappy Now" (3:48)

Released August 2014

=== Black Eye Diaries LP ===
1. "Small Town Hero" (3:47)
2. "I Confess" (3:47)
3. "Automatic Hit Machine" (2:40)
4. "Hands Up" (3:10)
5. "Lost Heroes" (3:20)
6. "Smalltown Boy" (2:59)
7. "Black Eye Friday" (3:17)
8. "Wanted" (3:02)
9. "Surfin' In Skegness" (3:11)
10. "Another Country" (2:59)
11. "Unhappy Now" (3:48)
12. "Lost Heroes" (Acoustic) (4:33)

Released October 2015

=== When Can You Start? LP ===
1. "Top of Your Game" (4:19)
2. "Heist" (3:36)
3. "Internet Detective" (2:44)
4. "People Person" (3:08)
5. "Yesterday’s Man" (5:09)
6. "A Quick Drink in the Worst Bar in the World" (1:30)
7. "The Perils of Midweek Drinking" (3:51)
8. "Office Party" (3:05)
9. "After Dark" (4:06)
10. "Retail is Detail" (1:15)
11. "Year Out" (3:27)
12. "No More 9 to 5" (5:31)

Released November 2017
