= Bonnie Bishop =

American singer-songwriter

Bonnie Elizabeth Bishop is a country rock singer-songwriter from Texas.

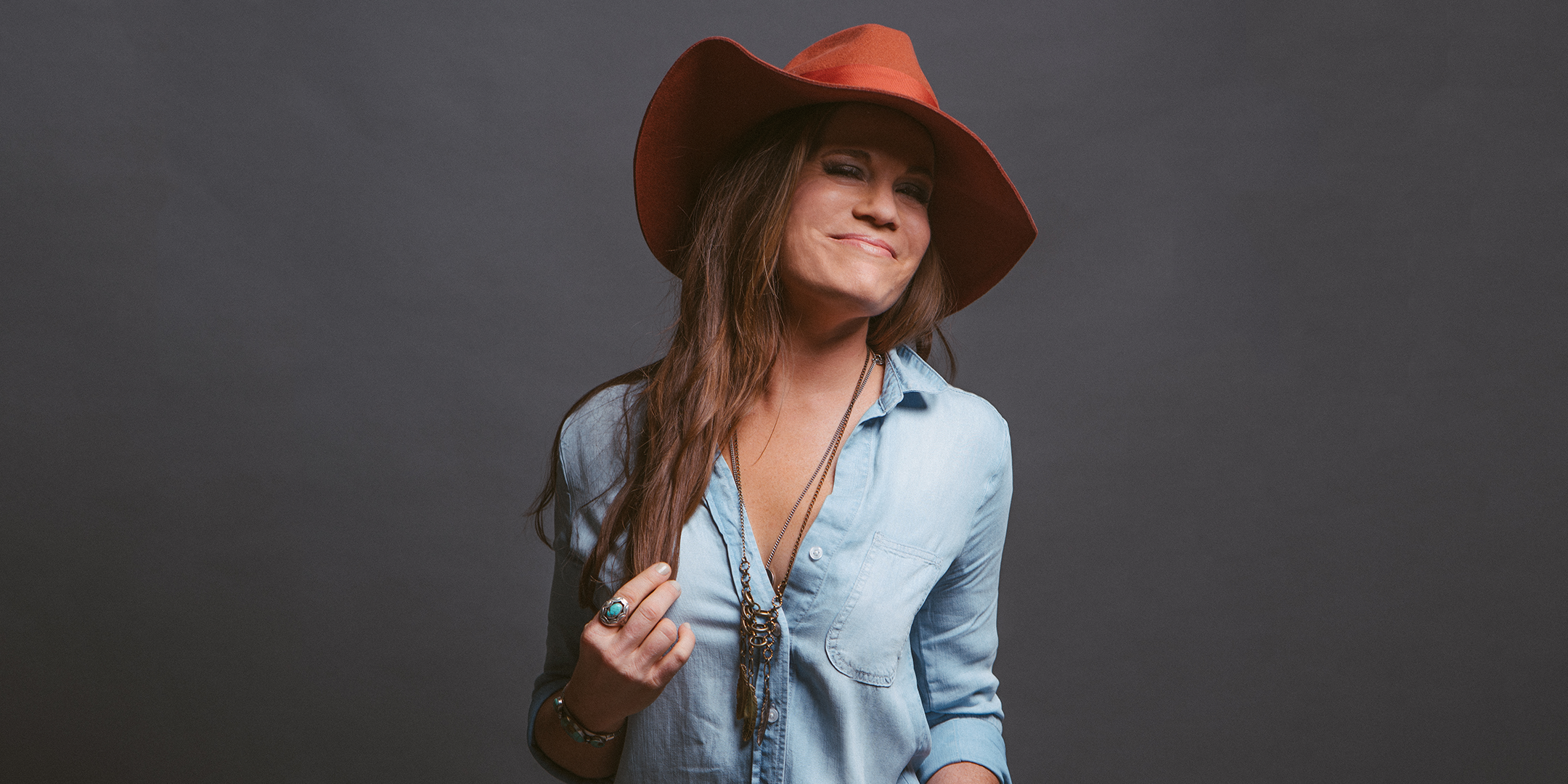
Bishop in 2016

== Education and early life ==
Bishop graduated with a sociology degree from the University of Texas at Austin in 2001.

== Career ==
In 2012, Bishop's idol Bonnie Raitt recorded the song "Not Cause I Wanted To." which she wrote with NRBQ guitarist "Big Al" Anderson. The song was selected as a New York Times Best Song of 2012 "Not Cause I Wanted To" and won a Grammy in 2013. Raitt later recorded Bishop's song "Undone." Another song Bishop wrote entitled "The Best Songs Come From Broken Hearts" appeared on the 2013 TV show Nashville.

After a decade of touring Bishop took a break and attended graduate school at Sewanee: The University of the South for creative writing. She was contacted by David Cobb and he produced her album "Ain’t Who I Was" which was released in 2016 .

In an interview with Nicole Huckabee in May 2024, Bishop announced that she is releasing a new album. She also announced that she had finished writing a book about her stepfather, NCAA football coach Jackie Sherrill.

== Albums ==
- Bonnie Bishop (2002)
- Long Way Home (2004)
- Soft to the Touch (2005)
- Bonnie Bishop and Friends: Live at Magnolia Avenue (2006)
- Things I Know (2009)
- Free (2012)
- Ain't Who I Was (2016)
- House Sessions Vol. 1 (2019)
- The Walk (2019)
- American Dream (2024)
