= 'Round Here =

Single by Sawyer Brown

from the album This Thing Called Wantin' and Havin' It All
- B-side: "I Will Leave the Light On"
- Released: November 13, 1995
- Genre: Country
- Length: 4:02
- Label: Curb
- Songwriters: Mark Miller, Gregg Hubbard, Scotty Emerick
- Producers: Mark Miller, Mac McAnally

Sawyer Brown singles chronology
"(This Thing Called) Wantin' and Havin' It All" (1995)	"'Round Here" (1995)	"Treat Her Right" (1996)

"'Round Here" is a song written by Mark Miller, Gregg Hubbard and Scotty Emerick, and recorded by American country music group Sawyer Brown. It was released in November 1995 as the second single from the album This Thing Called Wantin' and Havin' It All. The song reached number 19 on the Billboard Hot Country Singles & Tracks chart. It also peaked at number 19 on the Canadian RPM Country Tracks chart.

== Content ==
The song discusses an unyielding commitment to enduring love.

== Music video ==
The video for the song was directed by Michael Salomon, premiered in late 1995, and features former Major League Baseball player John Kruk.

== Chart performance ==
"'Round Here" debuted at number 73 on the U.S. Billboard Hot Country Singles & Tracks for the week of November 25, 1995.

Chart (1995–1996)	Peak position
Canada Country Singles (RPM)	19
US Hot Country Songs (Billboard)	19
