= This Thing Called Wantin' and Havin' It All =

Studio album by Sawyer Brown
- Released: August 29, 1995
- Studio: Muscle Shoals (Sheffield, Alabama); La La Land (Louisville, Kentucky); Scruggs Sound (Berry Hill, Tennessee); Recording Arts (Nashville, Tennessee); Javelina (Nashville, Tennessee); Sound Emporium (Nashville, Tennessee)
- Genre: Country
- Length: 36:30
- Label: Curb
- Producer: Mark Miller; Mac McAnally

Sawyer Brown chronology
Greatest Hits 1990-1995 (1995)	This Thing Called Wantin' and Havin' It All (1995)	Six Days on the Road (1997)

Singles from This Thing Called Wantin' and Havin' It All
- 1. "(This Thing Called) Wantin' and Havin' It All" Released: July 10, 1995; 2. "'Round Here" Released: November 13, 1995; 3. "Treat Her Right" Released: March 18, 1996

This Thing Called Wantin' and Havin' It All is the eleventh studio album by American country music band Sawyer Brown. Their fourth studio album for Curb Records, it produced four hit singles on the Billboard country music charts between 1995 and 1996: the title track, "'Round Here", "Treat Her Right", and "She's Gettin' There". "She's Gettin' There" was also the band's first single since 1991's "Mama's Little Baby Loves Me" to miss the country Top 40.

== Critical reception ==
Gary Graff and Brian Mansfield, in MusicHound Country: The Essential Album Guide, wrote that the album "continues to hone the band's direction as 'small town heroes'...The first three singles from the album...are probably the strongest trio of hits the group has ever had."

== Track listing ==
No.	Title	Writer(s)	Length
1.	"Nothing Less Than Love"	Mark Miller, Gregg Hubbard	3:38
2.	"Big Picture"	Miller, Mac McAnally	3:57
3.	"I Will Leave the Light On"	Duncan Cameron	3:10
4.	"(This Thing Called) Wantin' and Havin' It All"	Dave Loggins, Ronnie Samoset	3:28
5.	"Another Mile"	Miller, Hubbard	3:43
6.	"'Round Here"	Miller, Hubbard, Scotty Emerick	4:02
7.	"She's Gettin' There"	Miller, Emerick, John Northrup, M.C. Potts	4:04
8.	"Treat Her Right"	Lenny LeBlanc, Ava Aldridge	3:39
9.	"Like a John Deere"	Miller, Bill Shore	2:53
10.	"Small Town Hero"	Miller, Hubbard	3:56
Total length:			36:30

== Personnel ==
Sawyer Brown

- Mark Miller – lead vocals
- Gregg "Hobie" Hubbard – keyboards, backing vocals
- Duncan Cameron – guitars, mandolin, steel guitar, backing vocals
- Jim Scholten – bass
- Joe "Curley" Smyth – drums, percussion

Additional musicians

- John Hobbs – acoustic piano
- James Hooker – keyboards
- Mike Lawler – synthesizers
- Steve Nathan – keyboards
- Matt Rollings – acoustic piano
- Mac McAnally – acoustic guitar, electric guitar
- Dan Dugmore – steel guitar
- Paul Franklin – steel guitar
- JayDee Maness – steel guitar
- Roger Hawkins – drums, percussion
- Terry McMillan – harmonica
- The "A Strings" – strings (3)
- Jim Ed Norman – string arrangements (3)
- Bergen White – string arrangements (3)

== Production ==
- Mark Miller – producer
- Mac McAnally – producer, additional recording
- Alan Schulman – recording, mixing
- Ken Hutton – additional recording, recording assistant, mix assistant
- Steve Lowery – additional recording, recording assistant, mix assistant
- Kent Bruce – recording assistant, mix assistant
- Robert Charles – recording assistant
- Michelle Rahmani – recording assistant
- King Williams – recording assistant
- Paula Montondo – mix assistant
- Don Cobb – digital editing
- Denny Purcell – mastering
- Hank Williams – mastering
- Buddy Jackson – art direction, design
- Peter Nash – photography

Studios

- Recorded at Muscle Shoals Sound Studios (Sheffield, Alabama); La La Land Studio (Louisville, Kentucky); Scruggs Sound Studio, Recording Arts, Javelina Sound Studios and Sound Emporium (Nashville, Tennessee).
- Mixed at Scruggs Sound Studio, Sound Emporium and GroundStar Studios (Nashville, Tennessee); The Castle (Franklin, Tennessee).
- Mastered at Georgetown Masters and MasterMix (Nashville, Tennessee).

== Chart performance ==
Chart (1995)	Peak position
U.S. Billboard Top Country Albums	10
U.S. Billboard 200	77
