= (This Thing Called) Wantin' and Havin' It All =

Single by Sawyer Brown

from the album This Thing Called Wantin' and Havin' It All
- B-side: "I Will Leave the Light On"
- Released: July 10, 1995
- Genre: Country
- Length: 3:28
- Label: Curb
- Songwriters: Dave Loggins, Ronnie Samoset
- Producers: Mark Miller, Mac McAnally

Sawyer Brown singles chronology
"I Don't Believe in Goodbye" (1995)	"(This Thing Called) Wantin' and Havin' It All" (1995)	"'Round Here" (1995)

"(This Thing Called) Wantin' and Havin' It All" is a song written by Dave Loggins and Ronnie Samoset, and recorded by American country music group Sawyer Brown. It was released in July 1995 as the lead single from the album This Thing Called Wantin' and Havin' It All. The song reached number 11 on the Billboard Hot Country Singles & Tracks chart.

== Chart performance ==
"(This Thing Called) Wantin' and Havin' It All" debuted at number 57 on the U.S. Billboard Hot Country Singles & Tracks for the week of July 22, 1995.

Chart (1995)	Peak position
Canada Country Singles (RPM)	5
US Hot Country Songs (Billboard)	11

=== Year-end charts ===
Chart (1995)	Position
Canada Country Tracks (RPM)	65
