= I Don't Believe in Goodbye =

Single by Sawyer Brown

from the album Greatest Hits 1990–1995
- B-side: "Outskirts of Town"
- Released: March 6, 1995
- Genre: Country
- Length: 3:51
- Label: Curb
- Songwriters: Mark Miller, Bryan White, Scotty Emerick
- Producers: Mark Miller, Mac McAnally

Sawyer Brown singles chronology
"This Time" (1995)	"I Don't Believe in Goodbye" (1995)	"(This Thing Called) Wantin' and Havin' It All" (1995)

"I Don't Believe in Goodbye" is a song written by Mark Miller, Bryan White and Scotty Emerick, and recorded by American country music group Sawyer Brown. It was released in March 1995 as the second single from their compilation album Greatest Hits 1990–1995. The song reached number 4 on the Billboard Hot Country Singles & Tracks chart.

== Chart performance ==
"I Don't Believe in Goodbye" debuted at number 55 on the U.S. Billboard Hot Country Singles & Tracks for the week of March 18, 1995.

Chart (1995)	Peak position
Canada Country Singles (RPM)	8
US Hot Country Songs (Billboard)	4

=== Year-end charts ===
Chart (1995)	Position
US Country Songs (Billboard)	68
