= Buick (album) =

Studio album by Sawyer Brown
- Released: January 7, 1991
- Recorded: Fall 1989–Winter 1990
- Studio: Scruggs Sound (Berry Hill, Tennessee)
- Genre: Country
- Length: 33:25
- Label: Capitol/Curb
- Producer: Mark Miller; Randy Scruggs

Sawyer Brown chronology
Greatest Hits (1990)	Buick (1991)	The Dirt Road (1992)

Professional ratings
Review scores
Source	Rating
Allmusic	link
Entertainment Weekly	F link

Buick is the seventh studio album by American country music band Sawyer Brown. Released in 1991 on Capitol Records, it features the singles "One Less Pony", "Mama's Little Baby Loves Me" and "The Walk". Although these first two singles reached the lower portions of the Billboard country music charts, "The Walk" peaked at #2, and was reprised on the band's 1992 album The Dirt Road. Although "Superman's Daughter" was not released as a single, a video was filmed for it. This is Sawyer Brown's last album to feature guitarist Bobby Randall.

== Track listing ==
No.	Title	Writer(s)	Length
1.	"Mama's Little Baby Loves Me"	Gregg Hubbard, Mark Miller	3:08
2.	"My Baby Drives a Buick"	Miller, Randy Scruggs	3:01
3.	"When You Run from Love"	Mac McAnally, Miller	3:40
4.	"The Walk"	Miller	3:44
5.	"Forty-Eight Hours Till Monday"	Hubbard, Miller	2:46
6.	"Superman's Daughter"	Miller	2:18
7.	"One Less Pony"	Miller	3:22
8.	"Still Water" (with Donna McElroy)	Miller, Hubbard	3:19
9.	"Stealing Home"	Hubbard, Miller	3:13
10.	"Thunder Bay"	Miller, Scruggs	4:45

== Personnel ==
As listed in liner notes

Sawyer Brown

- Mark Miller – lead vocals
- Gregg "Hobie" Hubbard – keyboards, backing vocals
- Bobby Randall – lead guitars, backing vocals
- Jim Scholten – bass
- Joe "Curley" Smyth – drums, percussion

Additional musicians

- John Barlow Jarvis – keyboards, acoustic piano
- Mike Lawler – synthesizers
- Joe Erkman – electric guitar
- Steve Gibson – acoustic guitar
- Don Potter – acoustic guitar
- Randy Scruggs – acoustic guitar, electric guitar
- Glen Duncan – fiddle, mandolin
- Eddie Bayers – drums
- Donna McElroy – lead and backing vocals (8)
- Bob Bailey – backing vocals (8)
- Vicki Hampton – backing vocals (8)
- Mac McAnally – vocal arrangements

== Production ==
- Mark Miller – producer
- Randy Scruggs – producer
- Ron "Snake" Reynolds – recording, mixing
- Jeff Coppage – assistant engineer
- Milan Bogdan – digital editing
- Glenn Meadows – mastering at Masterfonics (Nashville, Tennessee)
- Buddy Jackson – art direction
- Beth Middleworth – design
- Peter Nash – photography
- T.K.O Artist Management – management

== Charts ==
=== Weekly charts ===
Chart (1991)	Peak position
US Billboard 200	140
US Top Country Albums (Billboard)	23

=== Year-end charts ===
Chart (1991)	Position
US Top Country Albums (Billboard)	46
