= Hard to Say (Sawyer Brown song) =

Single by Sawyer Brown

from the album Outskirts of Town
- Released: June 20, 1994
- Genre: Country
- Length: 3:24
- Label: Curb
- Songwriter: Mark Miller
- Producers: Mark Miller, Mac McAnally

Sawyer Brown singles chronology
"Outskirts of Town" (1994)	"Hard to Say" (1994)	"This Time" (1994)

"Hard to Say" is a song written by Mark Miller, and recorded by American country music group Sawyer Brown. It was released in June 1994 as the fourth single from the album Outskirts of Town. The song reached #5 on the Billboard Hot Country Singles & Tracks chart.

== Chart performance ==
"Hard to Say" debuted at number 71 on the U.S. Billboard Hot Country Singles & Tracks for the week of June 25, 1994.

Chart (1994)	Peak position
Canada Country Singles (RPM)	20
US Hot Country Songs (Billboard)	5

=== Year-end charts ===
Chart (1994)	Position
US Country Songs (Billboard)	67
