= Trouble on the Line =

Single by Sawyer Brown

from the album Cafe on the Corner
- Released: March 22, 1993
- Genre: Country
- Length: 2:31
- Label: Curb
- Songwriters: Mark Miller, Bill Shore
- Producers: Randy Scruggs, Mark Miller

Sawyer Brown singles chronology
"All These Years" (1992)	"Trouble on the Line" (1993)	"Thank God for You" (1993)

"Trouble on the Line" is a song written by Mark Miller and Bill Shore, and recorded by American country music group Sawyer Brown. It was released in March 1993 as the third single from the album Cafe on the Corner. The song reached number 5 on the Billboard Hot Country Singles & Tracks chart.

== Chart performance ==
Chart (1993)	Peak position
Canada Country Singles (RPM)	7
US Hot Country Songs (Billboard)	5

=== Year-end charts ===
Chart (1993)	Position
Canada Country Tracks (RPM)	98
