= Treat Her Right (Sawyer Brown song) =

Single by Sawyer Brown

from the album This Thing Called Wantin' and Havin' It All
- B-side: "She's Gettin' There"
- Released: March 18, 1996
- Genre: Country
- Length: 3:39
- Label: Curb
- Songwriters: Ava Aldridge, Lenny LeBlanc
- Producers: Mark Miller, Mac McAnally

Sawyer Brown singles chronology
"'Round Here" (1995)	"Treat Her Right" (1996)	"She's Gettin' There" (1996)

"Treat Her Right" is a song written by Ava Aldridge and Lenny LeBlanc, and recorded by American country music group Sawyer Brown. It was released in March 1996 as the third single from the album This Thing Called Wantin' and Havin' It All. The song reached number 3 on the Billboard Hot Country Singles & Tracks chart.

== Chart performance ==
"Treat Her Right" debuted at number 74 on the U.S. Billboard Hot Country Singles & Tracks for the week of March 23, 1996.

Chart (1996)	Peak position
Canada Country Singles (RPM)	19
US Hot Country Songs (Billboard)	3

=== Year-end charts ===
Chart (1996)	Position
US Country Songs (Billboard)	49
