= The Dirt Road =

Studio album by Sawyer Brown
- Released: January 6, 1992
- Recorded: 1991
- Studio: Scruggs Sound (Berry Hill, Tennessee); Masterfonics (Nashville, Tennessee); Muscle Shoals (Sheffield, Alabama)
- Genre: Country
- Length: 36:18
- Label: Curb/Capitol
- Producer: Randy Scruggs; Mark Miller

Sawyer Brown chronology
Buick (1991)	The Dirt Road (1992)	Cafe on the Corner (1992)

Singles from The Dirt Road
- 1. "The Walk" Released: June 25, 1991; 2. "The Dirt Road" Released: November 18, 1991; 3. "Some Girls Do" Released: March 4, 1992

Professional ratings
Review scores
Source	Rating
Allmusic	3/5 stars

The Dirt Road is the eighth studio album by American country music band Sawyer Brown. Released in 1992, it features the singles "The Dirt Road" and "Some Girls Do", both of which charted in the Top 5 on the Hot Country Singles & Tracks charts in 1992. "The Walk", a single from their previous album Buick, is also reprised here.

== Track listing ==
No.	Title	Writer(s)	Length
1.	"The Dirt Road"	Mark Miller, Gregg Hubbard	2:53
2.	"Some Girls Do"	Miller	3:12
3.	"Another Trip to the Well"	Miller, Hubbard	4:00
4.	"Time and Love"	Miller, Randy Scruggs	3:18
5.	"Ruby Red Shoes"	Miller, Hubbard	3:00
6.	"Fire in the Rain"	Miller, Butch D. Myers	3:03
7.	"Burnin' Bridges (On a Rocky Road)"	Miller	2:55
8.	"Sometimes a Hero"	Miller, Hubbard	3:47
9.	"Ain't That Always the Way"	Miller, Hubbard	2:40
10.	"When Twist Comes to Shout"	Miller, Hubbard, Terry McMillan	3:19
11.	"The Walk"	Miller	3:43

== Personnel ==
Sawyer Brown

- Mark Miller – lead vocals
- Gregg "Hobie" Hubbard – keyboards, backing vocals
- Duncan Cameron – lead guitars, dobro, mandolin, steel guitar, backing vocals
- Jim Scholten – bass
- Joe "Curley" Smyth – drums, percussion

Additional Musicians

- John Barlow Jarvis – keyboards, acoustic piano
- Mike Lawler – keyboards, synthesizers
- Steve Nathan – keyboards
- Bill Payne – keyboards
- Tommy Patterson – keyboards, backing vocals
- Bill Hinds – guitars, backing vocals
- Mac McAnally – guitars, backing vocals
- Randy Scruggs – guitars
- JayDee Maness – steel guitar
- Earl Scruggs – banjo (1)
- David Hood – bass
- Roger Hawkins – drums, percussion
- Paul Leim – drums, percussion
- Terry McMillan – harmonica, percussion

== Production ==
- Mark Miller – producer
- Randy Scruggs – producer
- Steve Melton – recording
- Ron "Snake" Reynolds – recording, mixing (2-11)
- Chuck Ainlay – overdub recording, mixing (1)
- Jay Johnson – assistant remix engineer
- Milan Bogdan – digital editing
- Glenn Meadows – mastering
- Buddy Jackson – art direction, design
- Chaim Mekel – photography

== Chart performance ==
Chart (1992)	Peak position
U.S. Billboard Top Country Albums	12
U.S. Billboard 200	68
Canadian RPM Country Albums	8

== Certifications ==
Region	Certification	Certified units/sales
United States (RIAA)	Gold	500,000^{^}
^{^} Shipments figures based on certification alone.
