= This Night Won't Last Forever =

1978 single by Bill LaBounty

Single by Bill LaBounty

from the album This Night Won't Last Forever
- B-side: "Corporate Rock & Roll"
- Released: July 21, 1978
- Recorded: 1978
- Genre: Soft rock
- Length: 4:25
- Label: Warner Bros., Curb
- Songwriters: Bill LaBounty, Roy Freeland
- Producer: Jay Senter

Bill LaBounty singles chronology
"Lie to Me" (1976)	"This Night Won't Last Forever" (1978)	"In 25 Words or Less" (1978)

"This Night Won't Last Forever" is a song written by Bill LaBounty and Roy Freeland, and originally recorded by LaBounty in 1978, whose version of the song was a minor Adult Contemporary and pop hit, reaching number 65 on the Billboard Hot 100.

== Michael Johnson version ==
"This Night Won't Last Forever"

Single by Michael Johnson

from the album Dialogue
- B-side: "I Just Can't Say No to You"
- Released: July 1979
- Genre: Soft rock
- Length: 3:59
- Label: EMI
- Songwriters: Bill LaBounty, Roy Freeland
- Producers: Brent Maher, Steve Gibson

Michael Johnson singles chronology
"Sailing Without a Sail" (1979)	"This Night Won't Last Forever" (1979)	"I'll Always Love You" (1979)

The following year, American singer-songwriter Michael Johnson covered "This Night Won't Last Forever", released as the lead single from his fifth album Dialogue, backed with a cover of Parker McGee's "I Just Can't Say No to You", also included on the album. Johnson's version of "This Night Won't Last Forever" reached number 19 on the US Billboard Hot 100, and was also a top 10 Adult Contemporary hit in the United States (#5) and Canada (#9).

== Bob Dylan version ==
In the early 1980s, Bob Dylan recorded a cover version of the song, which was issued on his 2021 compilation album The Bootleg Series Vol. 16: Springtime in New York 1980–1985.

== Lynn Anderson version ==
In 1979, Lynn Anderson covered the song on her album Outlaw Is Just a State of Mind.

== Moe Bandy version ==
In 1988, Moe Bandy covered the song on his album Many Mansions. His version peaked at number 49 on the U.S. Hot Country charts in 1989.

== Sawyer Brown version ==
"This Night Won't Last Forever"

Single by Sawyer Brown

from the album Six Days on the Road
- B-side: "Six Days on the Road"
- Released: June 16, 1997
- Genre: Country
- Length: 3:56
- Label: Curb
- Songwriters: Bill LaBounty, Roy Freeland
- Producers: Mark Miller, Mac McAnally

Sawyer Brown singles chronology
"Six Days on the Road" (1997)	"This Night Won't Last Forever" (1997)	"Another Side" (1997)

In 1997, Sawyer Brown covered the song. It was released in June 1997 as the second single from the album Six Days on the Road. Sawyer Brown's version went to number 6 on the U.S. Hot Country Songs charts.

== Critical reception ==
Larry Flick of Billboard reviewed Sawyer Brown's version and wrote, "It's a song that most people will remember and find themselves singing along with. The familiarity and strong performance should make for a potent combination at country radio."

== Chart performance ==
=== Weekly charts ===
==== Bill LaBounty ====
Chart (1978)	Peak position
U.S. Billboard Hot Adult Contemporary Tracks	46
US Billboard Hot 100	65
Canadian RPM Top Singles	81

==== Michael Johnson ====
Chart (1979)	Peak position
US Billboard Hot Adult Contemporary Tracks	5
US Billboard Hot 100	19
US Cash Box Top 100	18
Australia (Kent Music Report)	75
Canadian RPM Adult Contemporary	9
Canadian RPM Top Singles	66

==== Moe Bandy ====
Chart (1989)	Peak position
US Hot Country Songs (Billboard)	49

==== Sawyer Brown ====
Chart (1997)	Peak position
Canada Country Singles (RPM)	11
US Bubbling Under Hot 100 (Billboard)	9
US Hot Country Songs (Billboard)	6

=== Year-end charts ===
Chart (1997)	Position
Canada Country Tracks (RPM)	74
US Country Songs (Billboard)	69
