= Six Days on the Road =

1963 single by Dave Dudley

Single by Dave Dudley

from the album Songs About the Working Man
- B-side: "I Feel a Cry Coming On"
- Released: May 1963 (U.S.)
- Recorded: March 1963
- Studio: Kay Bank Studios (Minneapolis, Minnesota)
- Genre: Country, truck-driving country
- Length: 2:24
- Label: Golden Wing 3020
- Songwriters: Earl Green and Carl Montgomery
- Producer: Shelby Singleton

Dave Dudley singles chronology
"Under the Cover of the Night" (1962)	"Six Days on the Road" (1963)	"Cowboy Boots" (1963)

"Six Days on the Road" is a truck-driving country song written by Earl Green and Muscle Shoals Sound Studio songwriter Carl Montgomery, made famous by country music singer Dave Dudley. The song was initially recorded by Paul Davis (not to be confused with the singer) and released in 1961 on the Bulletin label. In 1963, the song became a major hit when released by Dudley, peaking at number two on the Billboard Hot Country Songs chart and cracking the top 40 (number 32) on the Hot 100, leading to it being hailed as the definitive celebration of the American truck driver.

In 1997, more than 30 years after Dudley's version charted, country music band Sawyer Brown took the song back to the Hot Country Songs chart, reaching number 13.

== Dave Dudley version ==
According to country music historian Bill Malone, "Six Days on the Road" was not the first truck driving song; Malone credits "Truck Driver's Blues" by Cliff Bruner, released in 1940, with that distinction. "Nor is it necessarily the best," said Malone, citing songs such as "Truck Drivin' Man" by Terry Fell and "White Line Fever" by Merle Haggard and the Strangers as songs that "would certainly rival it".

However, "Six Days", Malone continued, "set off a vogue for such songs" that continued for many years. "The trucking songs coincided with country music's growing identification as working man's music in the 1960s," he said. Many country music artists and bands—including Alabama, Dick Curless, Merle Haggard, Kathy Mattea, Ronnie Milsap, Jerry Reed, Del Reeves, Dan Seals, Red Simpson, Red Sovine, Joe Stampley, C.W. McCall, Steve Earle, and David Allen Coe, among many others—recorded successful truck driving songs during the next 25 years. Several of those artists—Dudley included—became almost exclusively associated with songs about truck drivers and life on the road.

Dudley "strikingly captures the sense of boredom, danger, and swaggering masculinity that often accompanies long-distance truck driving. His macho interpretation, with its rock-and-roll overtones, is perfect for the song."

Allmusic writer Bill Dahl, called "Six Days" the "ultimate overworked rig-driver's lament;" indeed, the song's lyrics bemoan highway patrolmen, scale weigh-ins, and loneliness for the narrator's girlfriend, and speak of using "little white pills" to keep him awake. Like Malone, Dahl also cited Dudley's voice as perfect for the song, as "his bottomless pipes were certainly the ultimate vehicle for its delivery, reeking of too much turbid coffee and too many nonfiltered cigarettes."

Dudley's version was also played during the STS-3 mission as a wake-up call.

=== Chart performance ===
Released in late-April 1963, "Six Days on the Road" became Dudley's first major hit, reaching number two on the Billboard Hot Country Singles chart that summer. The record spent 21 weeks on this chart, and it also became a minor hit on top 40 radio stations, peaking at number 32 on the Billboard Hot 100. It was also listed at number 13 on their easy listening survey.

Many truck-driving themed hits followed for Dudley, including "Last Day in the Mines," "Truck Drivin' Son-of-a-Gun", and "Truck Driver's Prayer."

Chart (1963)	Peak position
US Hot Country Songs (Billboard)	2
US Adult Contemporary (Billboard)	13
US Billboard Hot 100	32

== Sawyer Brown version ==
"Six Days on the Road"

Single by Sawyer Brown

from the album Six Days on the Road
- Released: 1997
- Genre: Country rock, rock and roll, rockabilly
- Length: 2:53
- Label: Curb
- Songwriters: Earl Green and Carl Montgomery
- Producers: Mark Miller, Mac McAnally

Sawyer Brown singles chronology
"She's Gettin' There" (1996)	"Six Days on the Road" (1997)	"This Night Won't Last Forever" (1997)

Sawyer Brown included the song on their 1997 album Six Days on the Road. Their version peaked at number 13 on the country charts that year. They changed the line "I'm taking little white pills" to "I'm passing little white lines", thus omitting the drug reference.

=== Chart performance ===
Chart (1997)	Peak position
Canada Country Singles (RPM)	9
US Bubbling Under Hot 100 (Billboard)	17
US Hot Country Songs (Billboard)	13

=== Year-end charts ===
Chart (1997)	Position
Canada Country Tracks (RPM)	87

== Other versions ==
- Tom Petty’s band Mudcrutch

=== "Six Tons of Toys" ===
Dudley recorded a re-written Christmas version entitled "Six Tons of Toys" on his 1982 album Trucker's Christmas. This was covered by Paul Brandt on his 1997 album A Paul Brandt Christmas: Shall I Play for You?.
