= This Time (Sawyer Brown song) =

Single by Sawyer Brown

from the album Greatest Hits 1990–1995
- B-side: "Hard to Say"
- Released: November 14, 1994
- Genre: Country
- Length: 2:42
- Label: Curb
- Songwriters: Mark Miller; Mac McAnally
- Producers: Mark Miller; Mac McAnally

Sawyer Brown singles chronology
| "Hard to Say" (1994) | "This Time" (1994) | "I Don't Believe in Goodbye" (1995) |

"This Time" is a song written by Mark Miller and Mac McAnally and recorded by American country music group Sawyer Brown. It was released in November 1994 as the first single from their compilation album Greatest Hits 1990–1995. The song reached number 2 on the Billboard Hot Country Singles & Tracks chart, behind Pam Tillis' "Mi Vida Loca (My Crazy Life)".

== Content ==
The narrator discusses constantly being in fights with his significant other but not being able to live without her.

== Music video ==
The music video was directed by Michael Salomon and premiered in early 1995.

== Chart performance ==
"This Time" debuted at number 61 on the U.S. Billboard Hot Country Singles & Tracks for the week of November 19, 1994.

| Chart (1994–1995) | Peak position |
|---|---|
| Canada Country Singles (RPM) | 5 |
| US Hot Country Songs (Billboard) | 2 |

=== Year-end charts ===
| Chart (1995) | Position |
|---|---|
| US Country Songs (Billboard) | 58 |
