= The Walk (Sawyer Brown song) =

Single by Sawyer Brown

from the album Buick
- Released: June 25, 1991
- Recorded: 1990
- Genre: Country
- Length: 3:44
- Label: Capitol Nashville/Curb
- Songwriter: Mark Miller
- Producers: Mark Miller; Randy Scruggs

Sawyer Brown singles chronology
"Mama's Little Baby Loves Me" (1991)	"The Walk" (1991)	"The Dirt Road" (1991)

"The Walk" is a song written by Mark Miller, and recorded by American country music band Sawyer Brown. It was written in their 1982 Eagle Model 10 entertainer style tour bus sold to them by C.K. Spurlock, a well known music promoter. The bus known as "Lonely Night Saloon", and "Betty" is now owned by Dan Wright and Josh Misner, garaged in Fredericksburg, Virginia.

“The Walk” was released in June 1991 as the third and final single from their album Buick. It peaked at number 2 in the United States, and number 5 in Canada. It is also included on their 1992 album The Dirt Road.

== Content ==
The song is a ballad in which the song's narrator tells about his life through walking. In the first verse, he is a boy who is reluctant to walk down the driveway to the school bus and go to school, until he is comforted by his father. In the second verse, the narrator is again comforted by his father after becoming an adult and going out into the world alone. By the third verse, the father is now very old and they are both walking down the driveway. The son is walking his father to a nursing home. The father understands because he too had to walk his father down the driveway. It is a song about cycles.

== Music video ==
The music video was directed by Michael Salomon, and it is entirely in black and white.

== Chart positions ==
Chart (1991)	Peak position
Canada Country Singles (RPM)	4
US Hot Country Songs (Billboard)	2

=== Year-end charts ===
Chart (1991)	Position
Canada Country Tracks (RPM)	18
US Country Songs (Billboard)	46
