= Some Girls Do (song) =

Single by Sawyer Brown

from the album The Dirt Road
- Released: March 4, 1992
- Recorded: 1991
- Genre: Country
- Length: 3:12
- Label: Liberty/Curb
- Songwriter: Mark Miller
- Producers: Mark Miller; Randy Scruggs

Sawyer Brown singles chronology
"The Dirt Road" (1992)	"Some Girls Do" (1992)	"Cafe on the Corner" (1992)

"Some Girls Do" is a song written by Mark Miller, and recorded by American country music band Sawyer Brown. It was released in March 1992 as the second (third if "The Walk" is counted) single from their album The Dirt Road. It was a number-one hit in the United States, while it peaked at number 2 in Canada.

American Aquarium covered the song on their 2021 album Slappers, Bangers, and Certified Twangers: Vol 1.

== Content ==
The narrator states that some girls don't like boys like him, but "some girls do.". The song begins with a potential object of his affection turning up her nose at his Cadillac as a way of rebuffing his attentions. Another woman witnesses the exchange from her front porch as she's painting her nails. She hints that it takes more than that to attract a woman, and they hook up with one another.

== Music video ==
The music video was directed by Michael Salomon.

== Chart positions ==
Chart (1992)	Peak position
Canada Country Singles (RPM)	2
US Hot Country Songs (Billboard)	1

=== Year-end charts ===
Chart (1992)	Position
Canada Country Tracks (RPM)	19
US Country Songs (Billboard)	10

== Certifications ==
Region	Certification	Certified units/sales
United States (RIAA)	Platinum	1,000,000^{‡}
^{‡} Sales+streaming figures based on certification alone.
