= Paul Thorn =

American singer-songwriter and boxer

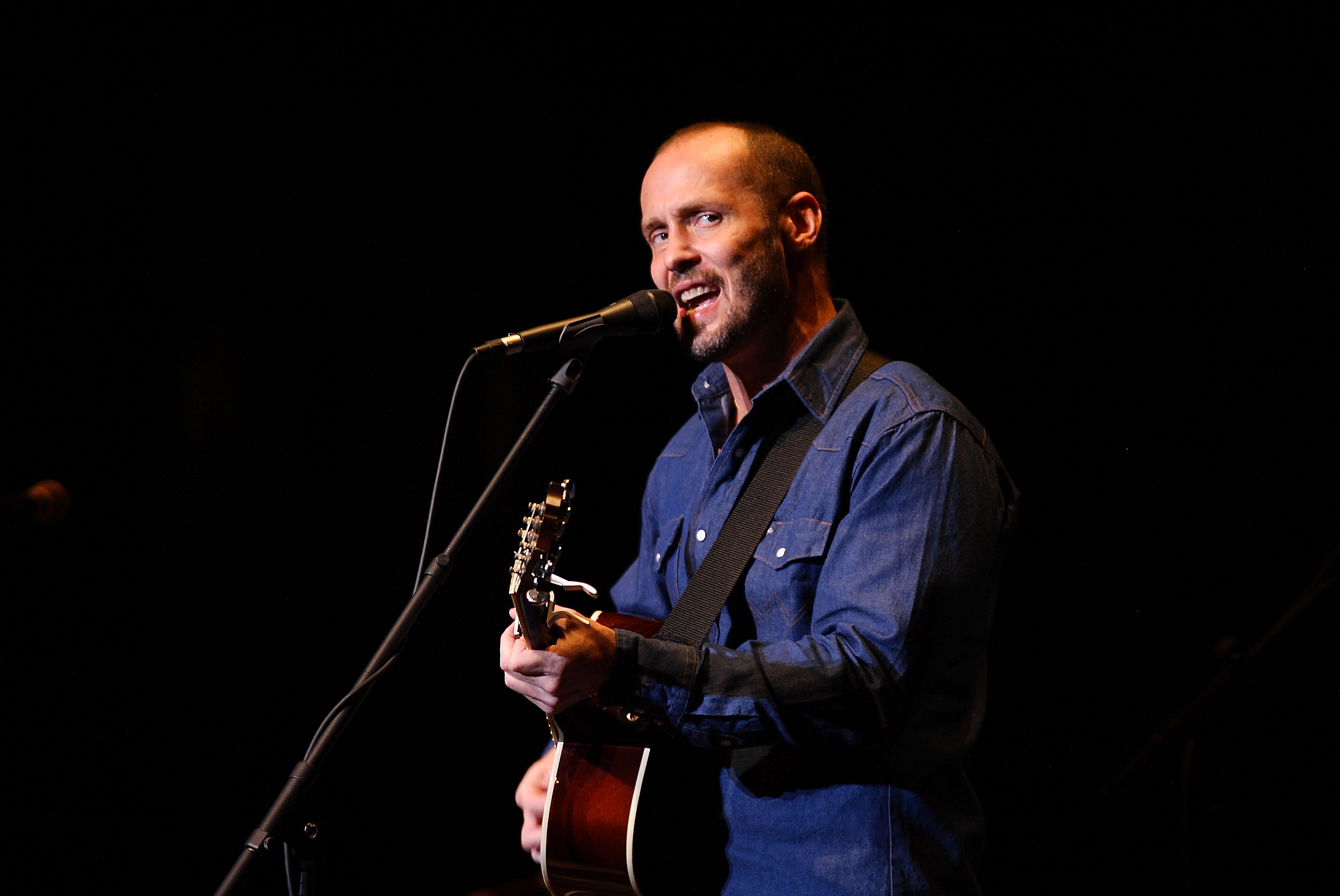
- Thorn at The Grand in Wilmington, Delaware, 2008

Background information
- Origin: Tupelo, Mississippi, U.S.
- Genres: Americana, Southern rock, Country, Blues, Blues rock
- Occupations: Singer; songwriter; boxer
- Instruments: Vocals, guitar
- Years active: 1997–present
- Labels: A&M Records, Perpetual Obscurity
- Website: www.paulthorn.com

Paul Thorn is an American Southern rock, country, Americana, and blues singer-songwriter, whose style is a mix of blues, country, and rock.

== Biography ==
Thorn was raised in Tupelo, Mississippi. Before his professional music career began, he was a professional boxer, where he established a respectable 14–4 record. Boxing career highlights include winning the Mid-South Middleweight Championship in Memphis, Tennessee and culminated with a nationally televised bout with former world champion Roberto Durán. After a few years of working in a Tupelo furniture factory and playing in local clubs, he was discovered by music professional Miles Copeland (brother of The Police drummer Stewart Copeland).

In 1997, while performing at a singer-songwriters night at a local pizza shop (Vanelli's), Roger Sovine, representing BMI, overheard Thorn and was impressed with his singing and songwriting ability. He asked Thorn if he had his permission to share his name with other record companies in Nashville. A couple weeks later, Thorn called vOz Vanelli (owner of Vanelli's) and mentioned that several record companies were coming to Tupelo to hear him perform. Thorn asked if he could come and play at Vanelli's which vOz agreed to. After hearing Thorn perform, Wyatt Easterling (an associate of Miles Copeland III) brought Thorn to Nashville and within thirty days, Thorn opened for Sting. Thorn was subsequently signed to a recording contract with A&M Records and recorded his first album, Hammer & Nail, in 1997. He left A&M soon after and followed Hammer & Nail with thirteen more albums, all self-released and self-produced with his writing and production partner, Billy Maddox.

Thorn's 2010 album Pimps and Preachers debuted at No. 83 on the Billboard 200 chart, his highest chart position to date. His 2012 album What the Hell Is Going On was the 12th Most Played Album of 2012 on the Americana Music Association Year-End Chart. What the Hell Is Going On was Thorn's first album to feature the songwriting of other artists and the second record of his to debut on the Billboard Top 100 during its first week of release.

Thorn has toured as an opening act for Huey Lewis & the News, Sting, John Prine, Marianne Faithfull, Mark Knopfler, Robert Cray, Bonnie Raitt, Jerry Jeff Walker, Toby Keith, Jeff Beck, and Tab Benoit.

In 2014, Thorn released Too Blessed to Be Stressed, which he described as a collection of "positive anthem songs." "I wrote these songs hoping they might put people in a positive mindset and encourage them to count their own blessings, like I count mine," Thorn observes. "There's no higher goal I could set for myself than to help other people find some happiness and gratitude in their lives."

In March 2018, Thorn released an album, titled Don't Let the Devil Ride, featuring several covers of gospel songs that were inspiration to him during his youth and adolescence. The album features several prominent artists in that genre such as the Blind Boys of Alabama, The McCrary Sisters, Bonnie Bishop, and the Preservation Hall Jazz Band. The album peaked at No. 1 in the Billboard Blues Albums Chart.

Later that month, the Mississippi House of Representatives named March 27 'Paul Thorn Day' in recognition of his constant support of his home state. On May 7, 2018, Mississippi Public Broadcasting premiered a special featuring Thorn's current tour titled "Mission Temple Fireworks Revival," which features special guests such as the Blind Boys of Alabama, The McCrary Sisters, Bonnie Bishop, and the Preservation Hall Jazz Band.

In 2019, Thorn's lead electric guitarist of 30 years, Bill Hinds, parted ways with the band. In a statement on Thorn's website, Hinds explains that he is starting a new chapter in his life, but will remain a musician. Hinds spot in the Paul Thorn Band has been filled by Chris Simmons, a guitarist from Alabama, who played in Leon Russell's band for five years.

In May 2020, multi-Grammy award-winning vocalist and pianist Diane Schuur released an album, featuring a cover of Thorn's, "Everybody Looks Good at the Starting Line."

=== Tales & Ales ===
On February 1, 2019, Thorn released the first episode of his interview and performance style video series, Tales & Ales. Since then, the show has featured several artists including John Oates, John Paul White, Foy Vance, Tommy Emmanuel, and Kingfish.

== Discography ==
=== Studio albums ===
Title	Details	Peak chart positions			
Title	Details	US	US Rock	US Heat	US Indie
Hammer and Nail	Release date: June 17, 1997; Label: A&M Records	—	—	—	—
Ain't Love Strange	Release date: July 27, 1999; Label: Ark Records	—	—	—	—
Live at Short Street Package Store	Release year: 2000; Label: Perpetual Obscurity	—	—	—	—
Mission Temple Fireworks Stand	Release date: August 13, 2002; Label: Narada/Perpetual Obscurity	—	—	—	—
Are You With Me?	Release date: 2004; Label: Back Porch	—	—	—	—
So Far So Good: Best of the Paul Thorn Band Live	Release year: 2005; Label: Perpetual Obscurity	—	—	—	—
A Long Way from Tupelo	Release date: February 19, 2008; Label: Perpetual Obscurity	191	—	7	27
Pimps and Preachers	Release date: June 21, 2010; Label: Perpetual Obscurity	83	24	—	12
What the Hell Is Goin' On?	Release date: May 8, 2012; Label: Perpetual Obscurity	88	31	—	12
Too Blessed to be Stressed	Release date: August 19, 2014; Label: Perpetual Obscurity	92	27	—	15
Don't Let the Devil Ride	Release date: March 23, 2018; Label: Perpetual Obscurity				
Never Too Late To Call	Release date: August 6, 2021; Label: Perpetual Obscurity	—	—	—	—
"—" denotes releases that did not chart
