= Thank God for You =

"Thank God For You"

Single by Sawyer Brown

from the album Outskirts of Town
- B-side: "Cafe on the Corner"
- Released: June 28, 1993
- Genre: Country
- Length: 3:17
- Label: Curb
- Songwriters: Mac McAnally; Mark Miller
- Producer: Mac McAnally

Sawyer Brown singles chronology
"Trouble on the Line" (1993)	"Thank God For You" (1993)	"The Boys and Me" (1993)

"Thank God For You" is a song recorded by American country music band Sawyer Brown. It was released in June 1993 as the lead single from their album, Outskirts of Town. Co-written by lead singer Mark Miller with Mac McAnally, the latter of whom also produced it, the song reached number one on the U.S. Billboard Hot Country Songs chart and on the Canadian RPM Country Tracks chart. It also peaked at number 17 on the U.S. Billboard Bubbling Under Hot 100 chart.

== Content ==
In this song, the narrator gives thanks for all the things that he has taken for granted in his life:

"I've got to thank mama for the cookin', Daddy for the whoopin', The Devil for the trouble that I get into. I've got to give credit where credit is due, I thank the bank for the money, thank God for you."

== Music video ==
The music video was directed by Michael Salomon and premiered in June 1993.

== Chart positions ==
"Thank God for You" debuted at number 63 on the U.S. Billboard Hot Country Singles and Tracks for the week of July 3, 1993.

Chart (1993)	Peak position
Canada Country Singles (RPM)	1
US Bubbling Under Hot 100 (Billboard)	17
US Hot Country Songs (Billboard)	1

=== Year-end charts ===
Chart (1993)	Position
Canada Country Tracks (RPM)	31
US Country Songs (Billboard)	4
