= Drive Me Wild (song) =

Single by Sawyer Brown

from the album Drive Me Wild
- B-side: "We're Everything to Me"
- Released: November 9, 1998
- Genre: Country
- Length: 3:35
- Label: Curb
- Songwriters: Mark Miller; Gregg Hubbard; Mike Lawler
- Producers: Mark Miller; Mac McAnally

Sawyer Brown singles chronology
"Small Talk" (1998)	"Drive Me Wild" (1998)	"I'm In Love with Her" (1999)

"Drive Me Wild" is a song written by Mark Miller, Gregg Hubbard and Mike Lawler, and recorded by American country music group Sawyer Brown. It was released in November 1998 as the first single and title track from the album Drive Me Wild. The song reached number 6 on the Billboard Hot Country Singles & Tracks chart. This was the band's last top 10 hit.

== Chart performance ==
"Drive Me Wild" debuted at number 65 on the U.S. Billboard Hot Country Singles & Tracks for the week of November 14, 1998.

Chart (1998–1999)	Peak position
Canada Country Singles (RPM)	1
US Billboard Hot 100	44
US Hot Country Songs (Billboard)	6

=== Year-end charts ===
Chart (1999)	Position
Canada Country Tracks (RPM)	11
US Country Songs (Billboard)	41
