= The Dirt Road (song) =

Single by Sawyer Brown

from the album The Dirt Road
- Released: November 18, 1991
- Recorded: 1991
- Genre: Country
- Length: 2:53
- Label: Curb
- Songwriters: Mark Miller, Gregg Hubbard
- Producer: Randy Scruggs

Sawyer Brown singles chronology
"The Walk" (1991)	"The Dirt Road" (1991)	"Some Girls Do" (1992)

"The Dirt Road" is a song written by Mark Miller and Gregg Hubbard, and recorded by American country music band Sawyer Brown. It was released in November 1991 as the lead-off (or the second if "The Walk" is counted) single from their 1992 album The Dirt Road. It peaked at number 3 in the United States, while it was a number-one hit in Canada.

== Content ==
The song's narrator is wanting to take the dirt road in his life, as he's been walking on it for years, and it has taken him where he needs to go. The dirt road represents working hard in life in contrast to walking on the a paved road which is considered "easy street."

== Music video ==
The song's music video was directed by Michael Salomon, and features a man walking on a road, and the band performing the song in a barn. The band's guest star is banjo legend Earl Scruggs.

== Chart positions ==
Chart (1991–1992)	Peak position
Canada Country Singles (RPM)	1
US Hot Country Songs (Billboard)	3

=== Year-end charts ===
Chart (1992)	Position
Canada Country Tracks (RPM)	11
US Country Songs (Billboard)	51
