= Cafe on the Corner (song) =

Single by Sawyer Brown

from the album Cafe on the Corner
- Released: August 3, 1992
- Genre: Country
- Length: 3:23
- Label: Curb
- Songwriter: Mac McAnally
- Producers: Randy Scruggs, Mark Miller

Sawyer Brown singles chronology
"Some Girls Do" (1992)	"Cafe on the Corner" (1992)	"All These Years" (1992)

"Cafe on the Corner" is a song written by Mac McAnally, and recorded by American country music group Sawyer Brown. It was released in August 1992 as the first single and title track from the album Cafe on the Corner. The song reached number 5 on the Billboard Hot Country Singles & Tracks chart and number 2 on the Canadian RPM Country chart.

== Content ==
The song is a ballad about the plight of a dispossessed farmer and others who are "down and out" in life.

== Critical reception ==
Deborah Evans Price, of Billboard magazine reviewed the song favorably saying that the song is supported by a "riveting video."

== Music video ==
The music video was directed by Michael Salomon and premiered in August 1992. The video starts off with a family moving all their belongings out of a farmhouse. It is revealed when the song starts that the farm was repossessed by the bank and will be sold for auction. The man is seen taking a job at a cafe in order to provide for his family and is shown doing various jobs such as busing tables and serving customers. The cafe is shown to have a disabled war veteran, a homeless man, who he provides a meal to, a couple of other dispossessed farmers and a businessman searching the classifieds for jobs amongst its clientele. The man, working at the café looks out the window and sees the bank officers across the street with the auction signs, implying the farm was successfully auctioned off. The sight upsets the man, who is consoled by the homeless man who he provided the free meal to. It was filmed in black-and-white, but the band's performance scenes have the grass and leaves on the trees colored green, while the rest of the shot is in b&w. The video concludes with the number for Farm Aid showing on the screen.

== Chart performance ==
"Cafe on the Corner" debuted at number 69 on the U.S. Billboard Hot Country Singles & Tracks for the week of August 8, 1992.

Chart (1992)	Peak position
Canada Country Singles (RPM)	2
US Hot Country Songs (Billboard)	5

=== Year-end charts ===
Chart (1992)	Position
Canada Country Tracks (RPM)	5
