= The Boys and Me =

Single by Sawyer Brown

from the album Outskirts of Town
- Released: October 11, 1993
- Genre: Country
- Length: 3:23
- Label: Curb
- Songwriters: Mark Miller, Mac McAnally
- Producers: Mark Miller, Mac McAnally

Sawyer Brown singles chronology
"Thank God for You" (1993)	"The Boys and Me" (1993)	"Outskirts of Town" (1994)

"The Boys and Me" is a song written by Mark Miller and Mac McAnally, and recorded by American country music group Sawyer Brown. It was released in October 1993 as the second single from the album Outskirts of Town. The song reached number 4 on the Billboard Hot Country Singles & Tracks chart.

Outskirts of Town also features a "dance mix" of the song, created by Brian Tankersley.

== Chart performance ==
Chart (1993–1994)	Peak position
Canada Country Singles (RPM)	2
US Hot Country Songs (Billboard)	4

=== Year-end charts ===
Chart (1994)	Position
Canada Country Tracks (RPM)	55
