= All These Years =

Single by Sawyer Brown

from the album Cafe on the Corner
- Released: November 23, 1992
- Genre: Country, acoustic, ballad
- Length: 3:20
- Label: Curb
- Songwriter: Mac McAnally
- Producers: Mark Miller, Randy Scruggs

Sawyer Brown singles chronology
"Cafe on the Corner" (1992)	"All These Years" (1992)	"Trouble on the Line" (1993)

"All These Years" is a song written by Mac McAnally, originally recorded on his 1992 album Live and Learn. It was later recorded by American country music group Sawyer Brown. It was released in November 1992 as the second single from their album Cafe on the Corner. Their version peaked at 3 on the Billboard Hot Country Singles & Tracks (now Hot Country Songs) chart, in addition to being a minor AC hit, peaking at 42 on the Hot Adult Contemporary Tracks chart.

== Content ==
The song opens with the story with an apparently serially unfaithful wife ("She likes adventure with security; and more than one man can provide") having an affair, and her husband catching her in a tryst ("She planned adventure feeling sure that he; Would not be home ‘til after five.") Frustrated at the betrayal, he tells her he's been responsible and has been working hard to provide, despite their issues ("And I'm still here, until I'm gone.") He frustratingly realizes he can't trust her: "Don't you rub it in too hard that I've been wrong."

The wife responds, "You're not the man you used to be" to which he clarifies "Neither is this guy." She acknowledges both of their roles in the couple's issues ("There's some things you refuse to see; But I guess sometimes so do I.") She states what she has done for the family, while he was working, she took care of their house and home and raised the family ("I made your supper and your daughter and your son,") and sees how much she stands to lose ("Still I'm here, and still confused; But I can finally see how much I stand to lose.")

The repeat of the final refrain, "I'm still here and so confused; But I can finally see how much I stand to lose; All these years," attributed to neither the husband nor the wife, indicates that both have seen what they have to lose, but are confused at the way forward.

== Critical reception ==
Larry Flick, of Billboard magazine reviewed the song favorably, calling it "a downer, but effectively presented for a dreary breakup number." He goes on to says that the positive is that listeners feel like there was a "meeting of the minds".

== Other versions ==
Mac McAnally recorded it on his 1992 album Live and Learn. McAnally's version was the b-side to the album's first single, which was its title track.

McAnally revisited the track on his 2017 album Southbound, a slightly more up-tempo and shorter version of "All These Years" at 3:00 (the 90's recording was 3:09).

== Chart positions ==
"All These Years" debuted at number 72 on the US Billboard Hot Country Singles & Tracks for the week of November 28, 1992.

Chart (1992–1993)	Peak position
Canada Country Singles (RPM)	2
US Adult Contemporary (Billboard)	42
US Hot Country Songs (Billboard)	3

=== Year-end charts ===
Chart (1993)	Position
Canada Country Tracks (RPM)	40
US Country Songs (Billboard)	73
