= Mac McAnally =

American singer-songwriter (born 1957)

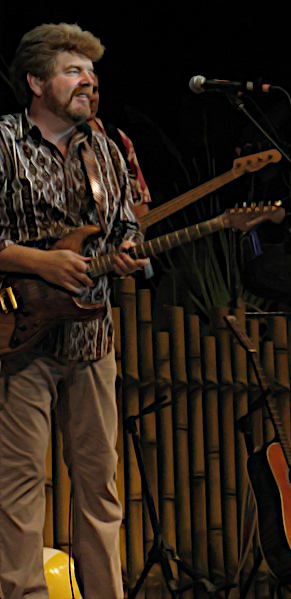
- McAnally in June 2009

Background information
- Born: Lyman Corbitt McAnally Jr. July 15, 1957 (age 68); Red Bay, Alabama, U.S.
- Origin: Belmont, Mississippi, U.S.
- Genres: Pop, Country
- Occupations: Singer-songwriter, session musician, record producer
- Instruments: Vocals, guitar
- Years active: 1977–present
- Labels: Ariola, Geffen, RCA, Warner Bros., MCA, DreamWorks Nashville, Mailboat, Show Dog
- Member of: The Coral Reefer Band

Lyman Corbitt McAnally Jr. (/ˈmækənæliː/; born July 15, 1957), known professionally as Mac McAnally, is an American singer-songwriter, session musician, and record producer. In his career, he has recorded ten studio albums and eight singles. Two of his singles were hits on the Billboard Hot 100, and six more on the Hot Country Songs chart. His ninth chart entry came in late 2008-early 2009 as a guest vocalist on Kenny Chesney's cover of his 1990 single "Down the Road".

In addition to his work as a solo artist, McAnally has written number-one singles for Alabama and Shenandoah, as well as songs for Sawyer Brown and T.G. Sheppard among others. He also holds a number of credits as a session musician, and has produced for Sawyer Brown, Restless Heart, and Jimmy Buffett. McAnally was also a longtime member of Buffett's backing band, the Coral Reefer Band, until Buffett's death in 2023, and has led the band since Buffett's death.

== Biography ==
=== Early life and career ===
Lyman Corbitt McAnally Jr. was born in Red Bay, Alabama. As a child, he began playing piano and singing in church at the Belmont First Baptist Church in Belmont, Mississippi, and by age fifteen, he had composed his first song. From there, he went on to become a session musician in Muscle Shoals, Alabama. During a session break, McAnally began to perform original material. The producers there encouraged him, and by 1977 he was signed to Ariola Records. His self-titled debut album produced the single "It's a Crazy World" which reached No. 37 on the Billboard Hot 100. Reviewing it in Christgau's Record Guide: Rock Albums of the Seventies (1981), Robert Christgau said, "although it does often sound pat, as folk stoicism will in a post-folk context, the first side comes across pretty outspoken for a Mississippi singer-songwriter with royalties in the bank—the heroine of one song is a rape victim who murders both assailant and judge after the latter lets off the former. Side two is Joe South."

A second album, No Problem Here, was issued in 1978, followed in 1980 by Cuttin' Corners on RCA Records. These latter two albums produced no chart singles. However, he found success as a songwriter for Jimmy Buffett, in addition to co-writing Alabama's Number One hit "Old Flame".

McAnally continued to record even while writing for Buffett. Mac eventually signed with Geffen Records with two albums (Nothin' but the Truth, which included the single "Minimum Love" which reached No. 41 on the Billboard Hot 100, and Finish Lines) being issued in 1983 and 1988, respectively. He and Walt Aldridge co-wrote Ricky Van Shelton's 1987 single "Crime of Passion".

=== 1990s and 2000s ===
In 1990, McAnally signed to Warner Bros. Records, releasing Simple Life that year. This album produced his first Top 40 country hit in the No. 14 "Back Where I Come From." Kenny Chesney would also record McAnally's "Back Where I Come From" for his 1996 album Me and You. Also in 1990, Steve Wariner released a McAnally co-write, the Top Ten hit "Precious Thing." The only other single from Simple Life was the No. 70 "Down the Road", and by year's end, he exited Warner Bros.' roster.

McAnally's seventh studio album, Live and Learn, followed in 1992, producing three low-charting singles. Also that year, he produced Sawyer Brown's album The Dirt Road, and continued to produce almost all of their subsequent albums, in addition to co-writing several of the band's singles between then and the late 1990s, including the Number One "Thank God for You", as well as the Top Five hits "All These Years", "Cafe on the Corner", "The Boys and Me", and "This Time". His second and final release for MCA, 1994's Knots, failed to produce any chart singles, although Linda Davis charted that year with "Company Time", which he wrote. Throughout the 1990s, McAnally also found work as a session musician, playing guitar on several artists' albums, in addition to joining Buffett's road band.

It was not until 1999, when he signed to DreamWorks Records Nashville, that McAnally released his next album. This album, Word of Mouth, also failed to produce any singles. Another album, Semi-True Stories, followed in 2004 on Mailboat Records, the same label to which Buffett is signed. Also in 2004, McAnally and Kyle Lehning produced Restless Heart's reunion album Still Restless, which included covers of three McAnally songs. In 2008, McAnally was awarded Musician of the Year by the Country Music Association. Also in 2008, he participated in the production of the album Psalngs, the debut release of Canadian musician John Lefebvre.

Kenny Chesney covered McAnally's 1990 single "Down the Road" on his 2008 album Lucky Old Sun, as a duet with McAnally. This rendition, released in late 2008 as its second single, became McAnally's first Top 40 country hit since "Back Where I Come From" in 1990. In February 2009, it became his first Number One as a singer. One month later, McAnally signed to Show Dog Nashville, a label owned by Toby Keith. His first single release for the label is "You First". His first album for the label, Down by the River, debuted at No. 56 on the Top Country Albums chart, becoming his first chart entry on that chart since 1990.

In 2011, Mac McAnally released the new album Live in Muscle Shoals on Mailboat Records, recorded in July 2010 at the W. C. Handy Music Festival in Muscle Shoals, Alabama. Appearing with him were the Coral Reefer Band’s bassist Jim Mayer and drummer Roger Guth.

In 2024, McAnally provided the voice of Terrence "Shaker" in the Country Bear Musical Jamboree at Walt Disney World's Magic Kingdom. Additionally, McAnally helped arrange the songs for the show.

McAnally lives in a home in the River Bluff section in Sheffield, Alabama, on the Tennessee River.

== Awards and nominations ==
Year	Award	Category	Result
2007	Nashville Songwriters Hall of Fame	Inducted to Hall of Fame	Inducted
2008	Country Music Association Awards	Musician of the Year	Won
2009	Country Music Association Awards	Musician of the Year	Won
2009	Country Music Association Awards	Musical Event of the Year — "Down the Road"	Nominated
2010	52nd Grammy Awards	Best Country Collaboration with Vocals — "Down the Road"	Nominated
2010	Country Music Association Awards	Musician of the Year	Won
2011	Country Music Association Awards	Musician of the Year	Won
2012	Country Music Association Awards	Musician of the Year	Won
2013	Country Music Association Awards	Musician of the Year	Won
2014	Country Music Association Awards	Musician of the Year	Won
2015	Country Music Association Awards	Musician of the Year	Won
2017	Country Music Association Awards	Musician of the Year	Won
2018	Country Music Association Awards	Musician of the Year	Won

== Discography ==
=== Albums ===
Year	Album	US Country	Label
1977	Mac McAnally	—	Ariola
1978	No Problem Here	—	Ariola
1980	Cuttin' Corners	—	RCA
1983	Nothing but the Truth	—	Geffen
1988	Finish Lines	—	Geffen
1990	Simple Life	63	Warner Bros.
1992	Live and Learn	—	MCA
1994	Knots	—	MCA
1999	Word of Mouth	—	DreamWorks; Nashville
1999	No Problem Here (re-release)	—	DreamWorks; Nashville
2004	Semi-True Stories	—	Mailboat
2006	Cuttin' Corners (re-release)	—	Magic
2009	Down by the River	56	Show Dog
2011	Live: In Muscle Shoals	72	Mailboat
2015	A.K.A. Nobody	—	Mailboat
2017	Southbound: The Orchestra Project	—	Mailboat
2020	Once in a Lifetime	—	Mailboat
"—" denotes releases that did not chart

=== Singles ===
Year	Single	Chart Positions						Album
Year	Single	US Country	US	US AC	CAN Country	CAN	CAN AC	Album
1977	"It's a Crazy World"	—	37	10	—	64	—	Mac McAnally
1978	"Opinion on Love"	—	—	47	—	—	—	No Problem Here
1983	"Minimum Love"	—	41	7	—	—	5	Nothin' but The Truth
1990	"Back Where I Come From"	14	—	—	18	—	—	Simple Life
1990	"Down the Road"	70	—	—	73	—	—	Simple Life
1992	"Live and Learn"	62	—	—	98	—	—	Live and Learn
1992	"The Trouble with Diamonds"	72	—	—	—	—	—	Live and Learn
1993	"Junk Cars"	72	—	—	87	—	—	Live and Learn
1993	"Not That Long Ago"	—	—	—	—	—	—	Live and Learn
2009	"You First"	—	—	—	—	—	—	Down by the River
"—" denotes releases that did not chart

=== Guest singles ===
Year	Single	Artist	Chart Positions			Album
Year	Single	Artist	US Country	US	CAN	Album
2008	"Down the Road" (re-recording)	Kenny Chesney	1	47	57	Lucky Old Sun

=== Music videos ===
Year	Video	Director
1990	"Back Where I Come From"	
1992	"The Trouble with Diamonds"	Michael Salomon
1993	"Not That Long Ago"	John Lloyd Miller
1994	"Down the Road"	John Lloyd Miller

=== Songs written or co-written by Mac McAnally ===
Title	Co-writer	Cover Artist	Peak Chart Position
"All These Years"	Not Applicable	Sawyer Brown	No. 3 Billboard Country Singles Chart
"Back Where I Come From"	Not Applicable	Kenny Chesney	No. 14 Billboard Country Singles Chart
"The Boys and Me"	Mark Miller	Sawyer Brown	No. 3 Billboard Country Singles Chart
"Cafe on the Corner"	Not Applicable	Sawyer Brown	No. 5 Billboard Country Singles Chart
"Crime of Passion"	Walt Aldridge	Ricky Van Shelton	No. 7 Billboard Country Singles Chart
"Down the Road"	Not Applicable	Kenny Chesney	No. 1 Billboard Country Singles Chart
"I'm Gonna Hurt Her on the Radio"	Tom Brasfield	David Allan Coe	No. 52 Billboard Country Singles Chart
"I'm Gonna Love Her on the Radio"	Tom Brasfield	Charley Pride	No. 13 Billboard Country Singles Chart
"It's My Job"	Not Applicable	Jimmy Buffett	No. 57 Billboard Hot 100 Singles Chart
"It's a Crazy World"	Not Applicable	Self-Recorded	No. 37 Billboard Hot 100 Singles Chart
"Minimum Love"	Jerry Wexler	Self-Recorded	No. 7 Billboard Adult Contemporary Singles Chart
"Old Flame"	Donny Lowery	Alabama	No. 1 Billboard Country Singles Chart
"One Owner Heart"	Walt Aldridge & Tom Brasfield	T.G. Sheppard	No. 4 Billboard Country Singles Chart
"Opinion on Love"	Not Applicable	Self-Recorded	No. 47 Billboard Adult Contemporary Singles Chart
"Precious Thing"	Steve Wariner	Steve Wariner	No. 8 Billboard Country Singles Chart
"She Put the Sad in All His Songs"	Robert Byrne	Ronnie Dunn	No. 59 Billboard Country Singles Chart
"Southbound"	Not Applicable	Sammy Kershaw	No. 27 Billboard Country Singles Chart
"Thank God for You"	Mark Miller	Sawyer Brown	No. 1 Billboard Country Singles Chart
"This Time"	Mark Miller	Sawyer Brown	No. 2 Billboard Country Singles Chart
"Two Dozen Roses"	Robert Byrne	Shenandoah	No. 1 Billboard Country Singles Chart
"You're My First Lady"	Not Applicable	T.G. Sheppard	No. 2 Billboard Country Singles Chart

=== Theme parks ===
Year	Title	Role	Note
2024	Country Bear Musical Jamboree	Terrence	
