= Shenandoah discography =

- Studio albums: 11
- Compilation albums: 8
- Singles: 31
- Music videos: 17
- No.1 Single (U.S.): 5

Shenandoah is an American country music band founded in 1984 by Marty Raybon, Ralph Ezell, Stan Thorn, Jim Seales and Mike McGuire. Its discography comprises eleven studio albums, a greatest hits package, a Christmas music album, and eight compilations. Two of Shenandoah's studio albums — The Road Not Taken (1989) and Extra Mile (1990) — have been certified gold by the Recording Industry Association of America (RIAA). The band's 1994 Super Hits compilation, part of a series issued by Sony BMG Special Markets, has been certified gold as well.

Shenandoah has also released 31 singles to country radio. Of these singles, five have reached Number One on the Billboard country charts: "The Church on Cumberland Road", "Sunday in the South" and "Two Dozen Roses" (all 1989), "Next to You, Next to Me" (1990), and "If Bubba Can Dance (I Can Too)" (1994). Ten more singles have reached Top Ten on that chart, including the late 1994-early 1995 "Somewhere in the Vicinity of the Heart", a collaboration with Alison Krauss, which was also her first Top 40 country hit.

== Studio albums ==
Title	Album details	Peak chart positions				Certifications (sales thresholds)
Title	Album details	US Country	US	US Heat	CAN Country	Certifications (sales thresholds)
Shenandoah	Release date: September 1987; Label: Columbia Records	—	—	—	—	
The Road Not Taken	Release date: January 31, 1989; Label: Columbia Records	6	—	—	10	US: Gold
Extra Mile	Release date: May 2, 1990; Label: Columbia Records	11	186	—	—	US: Gold
Long Time Comin'	Release date: May 12, 1992; Label: RCA Nashville	34	—	—	14	
Under the Kudzu	Release date: July 27, 1993; Label: RCA Nashville	38	—	33	8	
In the Vicinity of the Heart	Release date: November 15, 1994; Label: Liberty Records	31	182	11	—	
Shenandoah Christmas	Release date: September 17, 1996; Label: Capitol Nashville	—	—	—	—	
Shenandoah 2000	Release date: September 12, 2000; Label: Free Falls Records	—	—	—	—	
Journeys	Release date: January 17, 2006; Label: Cumberland Road Records	—	—	—	—	
Good News Travels Fast	Release date: April 29, 2016; Label: Daywood Roots Records	—	—	—	—	
Every Road	Release date: November 13, 2020; Label: Foundry Records	—	—	—	—	
"—" denotes releases that did not chart

== Compilation albums ==
Title	Album details	Peak chart positions			Certifications (sales thresholds)
Title	Album details	US Country	US Heat	CAN Country	Certifications (sales thresholds)
Greatest Hits	Release date: March 31, 1992; Label: Columbia Records	43	—	13	
Super Hits	Release date: May 31, 1994; Label: Columbia Records	65	19	—	US: Gold
The Best of Shenandoah	Release date: May 23, 1995; Label: RCA Nashville	—	—	—	
Now and Then	Release date: April 2, 1996; Label: Capitol Nashville	54	32	—	
15 Favorites	Release date: May 18, 1999; Label: Capitol Nashville	—	—	—	
Certified Hits	Release date: September 24, 2002; Label: Capitol Nashville	—	—	—	
All American Country	Release date: April 1, 2003; Label: BMG Special Products	—	—	—	
Reloaded	Release date: March 16, 2018; Label: BMG	—	—	—	
"—" denotes releases that did not chart

== Extended plays ==
Title	Album details
Christmas Comes Alive	Release date: November 19, 2014; Label: Cumberland Road Records

== Singles ==
Year	Single	Peak chart positions		Certifications (sales thresholds)	Album
Year	Single	US Country	CAN Country	Certifications (sales thresholds)	Album
1987	"They Don't Make Love Like We Used To"	54	59		Shenandoah
1987	"Stop the Rain"	28	—		Shenandoah
1988	"She Doesn't Cry Anymore"	9	36		Shenandoah
1988	"Mama Knows"	5	4		The Road Not Taken
1989	"The Church on Cumberland Road"	1	1		The Road Not Taken
1989	"Sunday in the South"	1	1		The Road Not Taken
1989	"Two Dozen Roses"	1	1	RIAA: 2× Platinum	The Road Not Taken
1990	"See If I Care"	6	5		The Road Not Taken
1990	"Next to You, Next to Me"	1	1		Extra Mile
1990	"Ghost in This House"	5	2		Extra Mile
1991	"I Got You"	7	4		Extra Mile
1991	"The Moon Over Georgia"	9	11		Extra Mile
1991	"When You Were Mine"	38	23		Extra Mile
1992	"Rock My Baby"	2	5		Long Time Comin'
1992	"Hey Mister (I Need This Job)"	28	22		Long Time Comin'
1992	"Leavin's Been a Long Time Comin'"	15	24		Long Time Comin'
1993	"Janie Baker's Love Slave"	15	7		Under the Kudzu
1993	"I Want to Be Loved Like That"	3	4		Under the Kudzu
1994	"If Bubba Can Dance (I Can Too)"	1	1		Under the Kudzu
1994	"I'll Go Down Loving You"	46	55		Under the Kudzu
1994	"Somewhere in the Vicinity of the Heart" (with Alison Krauss)	7	7		In the Vicinity of the Heart
1995	"Darned If I Don't (Danged If I Do)"	4	7		In the Vicinity of the Heart
1995	"Heaven Bound (I'm Ready)"	24	20		In the Vicinity of the Heart
1995	"Always Have, Always Will"	40	23		In the Vicinity of the Heart
1996	"All Over but the Shoutin'"	43	36		Now and Then
1996	"Deeper Than That"	—	—		Now and Then
2000	"What Children Believe"	65	—		Shenandoah 2000
2001	"Building a Home"	—	—		Shenandoah 2000
2017	"Noise"	—	—		Reloaded
2020	"Every Time I Look at You" (with Lady A)	—	—		Every Road
2021	"Then a Girl Walks In" (with Blake Shelton)	—	—		Every Road
2023	"Revival"	—	—		Non-album single
2023	"Two Dozen Roses" (with Luke Combs)	—	—		Non-album single
"—" denotes releases that did not chart

== Music videos ==
Year	Video	Director
1989	"The Church on Cumberland Road"	Larry Boothby
1989	"Sunday in the South"	Larry Boothby
1990	"Next to You, Next to Me"	Larry Boothby
1990	"Ghost in This House"	Marius Penczner
1992	"Rock My Baby"	Dale Heslip
1992	"Hey Mister (I Need This Job)"	Marius Penczner
1992	"Leavin's Been a Long Time Comin'"	Marius Penczner
1993	"Janie Baker's Love Slave"	Roger Pistole
1994	"If Bubba Can Dance (I Can Too)"	Roger Pistole
1994	"I'll Go Down Loving You"	Roger Pistole
1994	"Somewhere in the Vicinity of the Heart" (with Alison Krauss)	Steven Goldmann
1995	"Darned If I Don't (Danged If I Do)"	Steven Goldmann
1995	"Heaven Bound (I'm Ready)"	Michael Merriman
2000	"What Children Believe"	
2018	"That's Where I Grew Up (Featuring Michael Ray)"	The Edde Brothers
2019	"Freebird in the Wind (Featuring Charlie Daniels)"	Scott Innes
2020	"Every Time I Look at You (with Lady A)"	
