= Super Hits (Shenandoah album) =

Greatest hits album by Shenandoah
- Released: 31 May 1994
- Recorded: 1988–1992
- Genre: Country
- Length: 34:15
- Label: Columbia Nashville
- Producer: Robert Byrne; Rick Hall

Shenandoah chronology
Under the Kudzu (1993)	Super Hits (1994)	In the Vicinity of the Heart (1994)

Alternative Cover
- 2007 re-issue

Super Hits is a budget priced compilation album from country music group Shenandoah.

Super Hits was certified Gold by the RIAA for sales of 500,000 copies.

== Track listing ==
No.	Title	Writer(s)	Length
1.	"Any Ole Stretch of Blacktop"	Frank J. Myers, Bernie Nelson	3:49
2.	"Mama Knows"	Tony Haselden, Tim Mensy	3:26
3.	"Sunday in the South"	Jay Booker	4:02
4.	"The Church on Cumberland Road"	Bob DiPiero, Dennis Robbins, John Scott Sherrill	3:00
5.	"Two Dozen Roses"	Robert Byrne, Mac McAnally	3:44
6.	"(It's Hard to Live Up to) the Rock"	Steve Baccus, Steve Dukes, Stan Munsey, Russ Zavitson	3:12
7.	"Next to You, Next to Me"	Robert Ellis Orrall, Curtis Wright	3:39
8.	"Ghost in This House"	Hugh Prestwood	3:37
9.	"I Got You"	Byrne, Greg Fowler, Teddy Gentry	3:46
10.	"The Moon Over Georgia"	Mark Narmore	3:14

== Release history ==
Year	Type	Label	Catalogue
1994	Cassette	Columbia	64183
1994	CD	Columbia	64183
2007	CD	SBME Special Mkts	705369

== Critical reception ==
Professional ratings
Review scores
Source	Rating
Allmusic	3.5/5 stars

Super Hits received three and a half stars out of five from Stephen Thomas Erlewine of Allmusic. Erlewine concludes that the album is "a good bargain for the budget-conscious.".

== Chart performance ==
Super Hits peaked at #65 on the U.S. Billboard Top Country Albums chart the week of January 28, 1995.

Chart (1994–1995)	Peak position
U.S. Billboard Top Country Albums	65
