= Greatest Hits (Shenandoah album) =

Greatest hits album by Shenandoah
- Released: March 31, 1992
- Genre: Country
- Length: 35:20
- Label: Columbia Nashville
- Producer: Robert Byrne, Rick Hall

Shenandoah chronology
| Extra Mile (1990) | Greatest Hits (1992) | Long Time Comin' (1992) |

Professional ratings
Review scores
| Source | Rating |
|---|---|
| Allmusic | link |

Greatest Hits is the first compilation album by American country music band Shenandoah. It was released in 1992 on Columbia Records. The album includes four singles from each of their 1989 album The Road Not Taken and their 1990 album Extra Mile, as well as the new tracks "Any Ole Stretch of Blacktop" and "(It's Hard to Live Up to) The Rock". The former was previously recorded by Collin Raye on his 1991 debut album All I Can Be, and the latter was co-written by Stan Munsey, who would later become the band's keyboardist.

== Track listing ==
| No. | Title | Writer(s) | Length |
|---|---|---|---|
| 1. | "Any Ole Stretch of Blacktop" | Frank J. Myers, Bernie Nelson | 3:48 |
| 2. | "Mama Knows" | Tony Haselden, Tim Mensy | 3:23 |
| 3. | "Sunday in the South" | Jay Booker | 4:04 |
| 4. | "The Church on Cumberland Road" | Bob DiPiero, Dennis Robbins, John Scott Sherrill | 2:59 |
| 5. | "Two Dozen Roses" | Mac McAnally, Robert Byrne | 3:41 |
| 6. | "(It's Hard to Live Up To) The Rock" | Steve Baccus, Steve Dukes, Stan Munsey, Russ Zavitson | 3:12 |
| 7. | "Next to You, Next to Me" | Robert Ellis Orrall, Curtis Wright | 3:39 |
| 8. | "Ghost in This House" | Hugh Prestwood | 3:36 |
| 9. | "I Got You" | Byrne, Teddy Gentry, Greg Fowler | 3:45 |
| 10. | "The Moon Over Georgia" | Mark Narmore | 3:13 |

== Chart performance ==
| Chart (1992) | Peak position |
|---|---|
| U.S. Billboard Top Country Albums | 43 |
| Canadian RPM Country Albums | 13 |
