= FAME Studios =

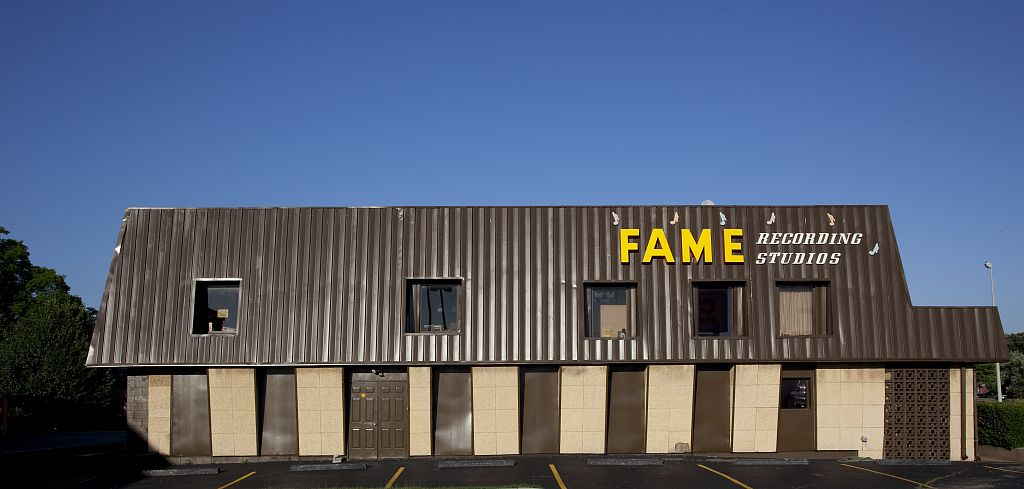
- FAME Recording Studios in 2010

- Location within Alabama
- 34.74506°N 87.66667°W
- Location: 603 Avalon Avenue, Muscle Shoals, Alabama 35661

Alabama Register of Landmarks and Heritage
- Official name: FAME Recording Studio
- Designated: Dec 15, 1997

U.S. National Register of Historic Places
- Official name: Florence, Alabama Music Enterprises (FAME) Recording Studios
- Designated: November 29, 2016
- Reference no.: 16000397

FAME (Florence Alabama Music Enterprises) Studios is a recording studio located at 603 East Avalon Avenue in Muscle Shoals, Alabama, United States, an area of northern Alabama known as the Shoals. Though small and distant from the main recording locations of the American music industry, FAME has produced many hit records and was instrumental in what came to be known as the Muscle Shoals sound. It was started in the 1950s by Rick Hall, known as the Founder of Muscle Shoals Music. The studio, owned by Linda Hall since 2018, is still actively operating. It was added to the Alabama Register of Landmarks and Heritage on December 15, 1997, and was listed on the National Register of Historic Places in 2016. The 2013 award-winning documentary Muscle Shoals features Rick Hall, the Muscle Shoals Rhythm Section (also called The Swampers), and the Muscle Shoals sound originally popularized by FAME.

== History ==
=== Early history ===
In 1959, Rick Hall and Billy Sherrill accepted an offer from Tom Stafford, the owner of a recording studio, to help set up a new music publishing company in the town of Florence, Alabama, to be known as Florence Alabama Music Enterprises, or FAME. The studio was first located above Florence's City Drug Store. Two doors down was a pawn shop – "Uncle Sams" – where aspiring artists would buy or pawn their instruments, depending on the trajectory of their careers. The studio was moved to a former tobacco warehouse on Wilson Dam Road in Muscle Shoals in 1960, when Hall split from Sherrill and Stafford, leaving Hall with rights to the studio's name.

Hall soon recorded the first hit record from the Muscle Shoals area, Arthur Alexander's "You Better Move On" in 1961. Hall took the proceeds from that recording to build the current facility, on Avalon Avenue in Muscle Shoals. The building was the first purpose-built recording studio in the Muscle Shoals region; the National Park Service, which lists it on the National Register of Historic Places, cites it as nationally significant for its role in the development of the Muscle Shoals Sound and Southern soul. In 1963, Hall recorded the first hit produced in that building, Jimmy Hughes's "Steal Away".

FAME studio prospered, and by the late 1960s pop and soul musicians such as Otis Redding, Wilson Pickett, Clarence Carter, and Solomon Burke had recorded there. Singer Aretha Franklin credited Hall for the "turning point" in her career when she recorded at FAME in early 1967, taking her from a struggling artist to the "Queen of Soul". According to Hall, one of the reasons for FAME's success at a time of stiff competition from studios in other cities was that he overlooked the issue of race, a perspective he called "colorblind". "It was a dangerous time, but the studio was a safe haven where blacks and whites could work together in musical harmony," Hall wrote in his autobiography. Decades later, a publication in Malaysia referred to Hall as a "white fiddler who became an unlikely force in soul music".

As the word about Muscle Shoals began to spread, other artists began coming there to record. The Nashville producer Felton Jarvis brought Tommy Roe and recorded Roe's song "Everybody" in 1963. The Atlanta music publisher Bill Lowery, who had mentored Hall in his early days, sent the Tams. The Nashville publisher and producer Buddy Killen brought Joe Tex. Leonard Chess encouraged Etta James to record there, and she made her 1967 hit "Tell Mama" and the Tell Mama album at FAME. Jerry Wexler of Atlantic Records brought both Wilson Pickett and Aretha Franklin to record. The recording session with Franklin brought unexpected conflict: one of the horn players sexually harassed the singer, and her husband had him fired from the session. Later that evening, Hall went over to make up with Franklin and her husband, but a fight ensued, and the recording session was canceled. Wexler swore to Hall he would never work with him again.

Duane Allman, later of the Allman Brothers Band, pitched a tent and camped out in the parking lot of FAME Studios in 1968 in order to be near the recording sessions occurring there. He soon befriended Rick Hall and Wilson Pickett, who was recording there. While on lunch break, Allman taught Pickett "Hey Jude"; their version of the song was recorded with Allman playing lead guitar. On hearing the session, people at Atlantic began asking who had played the guitar solos, and Hall responded with a hand-written note that read "some hippie cat who's been living in our parking lot." Shortly afterward, Allman was offered a recording contract; auditions for the Allman Brothers Band were later held at FAME Studios. Allman loved the area, and frequently returned to the Shoals for session work throughout his short life.

The session musicians who worked at the studio became known as the Muscle Shoals Horns and the Muscle Shoals Rhythm Section (or the Swampers). In 1969, just after Hall had signed a deal with Capitol Records, the four primary Muscle Shoals Rhythm Section members--Barry Beckett (keyboards), Jimmy Johnson (guitar), Roger Hawkins (drums), and David Hood (bass)--left to found a competing business, the Muscle Shoals Sound Studio, originally at 3614 Jackson Highway in nearby Sheffield, Alabama. Subsequently, Hall hired the Fame Gang as the new studio band. Also called the Third FAME Rhythm Section, it consisted of eight musicians plus arranger-producer Mickey Buckins. These groups backed up singers such as Wilson Pickett, Clarence Carter, Bobbie Gentry, Etta James, and Candi Staton during recording sessions at FAME Studios.

Aretha Franklin recorded at FAME on only one occasion, in early 1967; her hit "I Never Loved a Man (The Way I Love You)" was recorded at that time, with the Swampers providing the accompaniment. The track "Do Right Woman, Do Right Man" was also recorded during that session. Franklin later publicly acknowledged Rick Hall "for the turning point in her career, taking her from a struggling artist" to a major music star. The entire LP might have been recorded at FAME, but after Franklin's husband Ted White started an altercation, producer Jerry Wexler decided to continue recording in New York, including "Respect", again using the Swampers for the accompaniment.

=== 1970s to 1990s ===
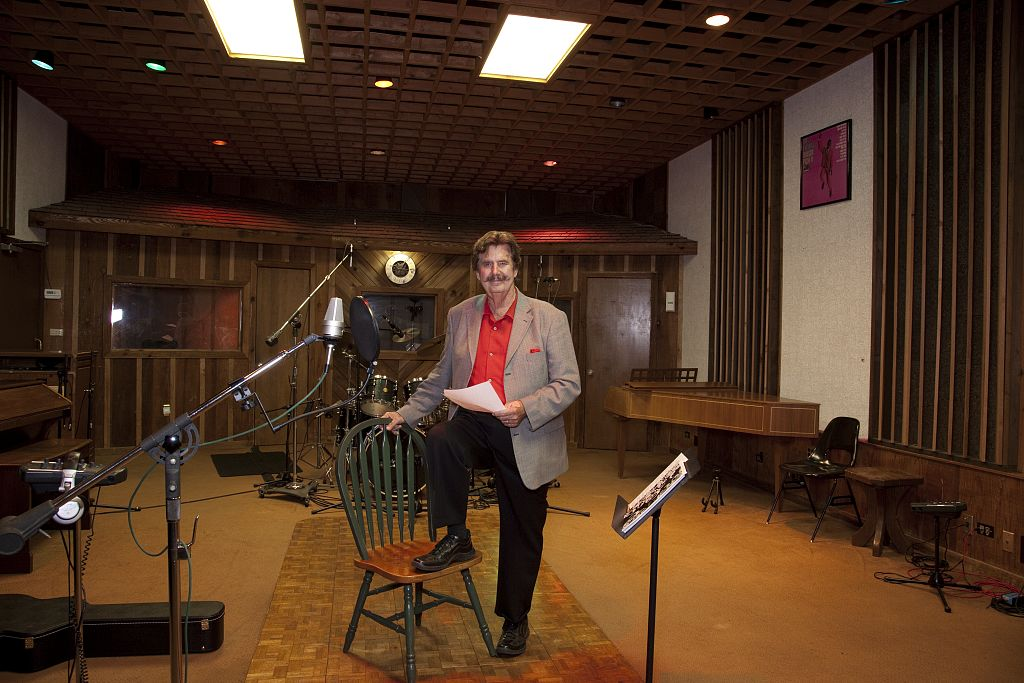
Rick Hall at FAME Studios in 2010

The studio continued to do well through the 1970s. Hall was able to convince Capitol Records to distribute FAME recordings. In 1971, Rick Hall was named Producer of the Year by Billboard magazine, a year after having been nominated for a Grammy Award in the same category.

As the hits kept coming, Hall expanded into the area of teen pop hits with the Osmonds, a vocal group from Utah, featuring the younger brother Donny Osmond. The collaboration resulted in the hit "One Bad Apple" in 1970, among others, and helped Hall to become named "Producer of the Year" in 1971. As the decade of the 70s rolled in, FAME moved toward country music, producing hits for Mac Davis, Bobbie Gentry, Jerry Reed, and the Gatlin Brothers. Hall also worked with the songwriter and producer Robert Byrne to help a local bar band, Shenandoah, top the national Hot Country Songs chart several times in the 1980s and 1990s. Hall's publishing staff of in-house songwriters wrote some of the biggest country hits in those decades. His publishing catalog included many significant items. In 1985, Rick Hall was inducted into the Alabama Music Hall of Fame, his citation referring to him as the "Father of Muscle Shoals Music."

Successful singers working at FAME included Bobbie Gentry, who recorded the album Fancy (1970), and the singer-songwriter Mac Davis, who topped both the pop and country charts with "Baby, Don't Get Hooked on Me" (1972). Davis recorded four gold albums at FAME, with the singles "Texas in My Rear View Mirror" and "Hooked on Music" becoming hits on both the country and pop charts. Many artists recorded with The Fame Gang, such as Joe Tex, Bobby Blue Bland, Eddie Floyd, Candi Staton, Clarence Carter, Little Milton, Sawyer Brown, Tony Joe White, Duane Allman, Elkie Brooks, and the Oak Ridge Boys.

Hall continued producing country hits in the 1980s, including Jerry Reed's number 1 records "She Got the Goldmine (I Got the Shaft)" and "The Bird" in 1982. He also started Gus Hardin's career with the popular "After the Last Good-bye" and had a hit album with Larry Gatlin and the Gatlin Brothers, Houston to Denver (1984). Hall's productions on T.G. Sheppard's LPs include Livin' on the Edge (1985), It Still Rains in Memphis (1986), and One for the Money (1987). Top 20 singles included "Fooled Around and Fell in Love" by the Elvin Bishop Group in 1975. Top 10 singles included "In Over My Heart" and "Doncha?" by T.G. Sheppard in 1985. Top 5 singles include "Strong Heart" (1985), "One for the Money" (1987), and a number 1 single, "You're My First Lady" (1987) by T.G. Sheppard also.

Hall then returned to the way he had begun, developing new artists. A local country band that was playing in a club down the street from FAME Studios came to his attention, and he and Robert Byrne co-produced an LP with the group Shenandoah. Hall made a record deal with CBS Records and the group thereafter had top 10 singles with "She Doesn't Cry Anymore" (1988) and "See If I Care" (1990), top 5 singles with "Mama Knows" (1988) and "The Moon Over Georgia" (1991), and six number 1 singles with "The Church on Cumberland Road" (1989), "Sunday in the South" (1989), "Two Dozen Roses" (1989), "Next to You, Next to Me" (1990), "Ghost in This House" (1990), and "I Got You" (1991).

In addition to FAME studios, Hall operated FAME Records, whose original roster included Clarence Carter, Candi Staton, Jimmy Hughes, Willie Hightower and the Fame Gang. The original run of the label was between 1964 and 1974, with distribution handled by Vee-Jay Records from 1964 to 1966, Atco Records from 1966 to 1967, Capitol Records from 1969 to 1972, and United Artists Records from 1972 through early 1974. In 2007, Hall reactivated the FAME Records label through a distribution deal with EMI.

=== Legacy ===
Rick Hall died in early 2018. In its obituary, The New Yorker concluded its coverage of Hall's career with FAME by saying, "Muscle Shoals remains remarkable not just for the music made there but for its unlikeliness as an epicenter of anything; that a tiny town in a quiet corner of Alabama became a hotbed of progressive, integrated rhythm and blues still feels inexplicable. Whatever Hall conjured there—whatever he dreamt, and made real—is essential to any recounting of American ingenuity. It is a testament to a certain kind of hope." An Alabama publication commented that Hall is survived by his family "and a Muscle Shoals music legacy like no other".

An article in the Anniston Star (Alabama) concludes with this epitaph, "If the world wants to know about Alabama — a state seldom publicized for anything but college football and embarrassing politics — the late Rick Hall and his legacy are worthy models to uphold".

In early 2018, Rolling Stone published this evaluation: "Hall's Grammy-winning production touched nearly every genre of popular music from country to R&B, and his Fame Studio and publishing company were a breeding ground for future legends in the worlds of songwriting and session work, as well as a recording home to some of the greatest musicians and recording artists of all time."

After Rick Hall died, his widow Linda Hall continued to run FAME Recording Studio. In 2023, Linda Hall was awarded a Woman In Music Award by the Muscle Shoals Music Association and the Muscle Shoals Songwriters Foundation.

=== 21st century developments (2010–present) ===
After founder Rick Hall’s death in 2018, son Rodney Hall (now FAME’s president) and Rick’s widow, Linda Hall, continued to operate FAME Studios and its affiliated record label and publishing business. Both remain fully active, attracting both veteran and contemporary artists. Gregg Allman recorded his final album Southern Blood at FAME in 2016, and Third Day cut their last album Revival there in 2017. Other artists who have recorded at FAME in recent years range from the Drive-By Truckers and singer-songwriter Jason Isbell to pop star Demi Lovato and gospel legends The Blind Boys of Alabama. Steven Tyler, Bettye Lavette, Alan Jackson, Jamey Johnson, the Revivalists, Anderson East, St. Paul & the Broken Bones, The Secret Sisters, Mike Farris, the Turnpike Troubadours, Keb Mo, and the Raconteurs have all brought projects to FAME. Emerging acts have also sought the studio’s magic. For example, country artist Ty Myers and blues musicians Marcus King and Mick Hayes recorded tracks at FAME. In 2025, Texas songwriter Kensie Coppin released her single “Texas in Me" on FAME Records and hit the Texas Music charts' top 10.

FAME’s musical legacy has been celebrated through high-profile events. On April 22, 2023, the City of Muscle Shoals marked its 100th anniversary with a free “Muscle Shoals 100th Birthday Bash” concert co-organized with FAME Studios. The once-in-a-century event, held on the lawn of City Hall, was headlined by country stars Kip Moore and Sara Evans alongside soul legend Candi Staton, backed by an all-star band of Muscle Shoals session veterans (including members of the Swampers rhythm section and the FAME Gang). In 2024, FAME Recording Studios itself celebrated its 65th anniversary with a weekend festival on October 4–5, 2024, culminating in an Orion Amphitheater concert in Huntsville, Alabama. The “65 Years of FAME” show featured artists such as The War and Treaty, Bettye LaVette, pedal-steel guitarist Robert Randolph, singer Maggie Rose, and others, with renowned Rolling Stones drummer/producer Steve Jordan serving as musical director and leading a house band of Muscle Shoals veterans (including original FAME session players like Spooner Oldham and Clayton Ivey). These events drew widespread attention to FAME’s enduring influence and honored the studio’s contributions to American music history.

FAME has also extended its presence into new recordings and technological initiatives. In September 2023, country group Shenandoah teamed with superstar Luke Combs to re-record Shenandoah’s 1989 hit “Two Dozen Roses” at FAME Studios – a collaboration that quickly hit No. 1 on iTunes’ Country and All-Genre charts and became Shenandoah’s first #1 song in 30 years. (Notably, the original “Two Dozen Roses” was also cut at FAME in the 1980s, highlighting the studio’s full-circle legacy). In early 2025, FAME launched a state-of-the-art “Studio X” immersive mix room in Florence, touted as the first fully immersive (Dolby Atmos-capable) mixing studio in Alabama. Developed in partnership with audio firm ADAM Audio and producer Glenn Rosenstein, Studio X is designed to offer three-dimensional sound production and attract top modern artists, blending FAME’s rich heritage with cutting-edge technology. These recent projects and upgrades underscore FAME Studios’ ongoing role at the intersection of music history and innovation, well into the 21st century.

== See also ==
- Category: Albums recorded at FAME Studios
- Muscle Shoals Sound Studio
- National Register of Historic Places listings in Colbert County, Alabama
