= I'd Rather Go Blind =

1967 blues song by Ellington Jordan

Single by Etta James

from the album Tell Mama
- A-side: "Tell Mama"
- B-side: "I'd Rather Go Blind"
- Released: 1967
- Recorded: 1967, FAME Studios, Muscle Shoals, Alabama
- Genre: Soul; blues; deep soul
- Length: 2:32
- Label: Cadet 5578
- Songwriters: Etta James; Ellington Jordan; Billy Foster
- Producer: Rick Hall

"I'd Rather Go Blind" is a blues song written by Ellington Jordan with co-writing credits to Billy Foster and Etta James. It was first recorded by Etta James in 1967, released the same year, and has subsequently become regarded as a blues and soul classic.

== Original version by Etta James ==
Etta James wrote in her autobiography Rage To Survive that she heard the song outlined by her friend Ellington "Fugi" Jordan when she visited him in prison. She then wrote the rest of the song with Jordan, but for tax reasons gave her songwriting credit to her partner at the time, Billy Foster, singer with doo-wop group The Medallions.

Etta James recorded the song at the FAME Studios in Muscle Shoals, Alabama. It was included on the album Tell Mama and as the B-side of the single of the same name which made number 10 on the Billboard R&B charts, and number 23 on the Billboard Hot 100. The song is also on the 1978 Jerry Wexler-produced album Deep in the Night, but there it is titled "Blind Girl" (track 10). Some critics have regarded "I'd Rather Go Blind" as of such emotional and poetic quality as to make that release one of the great double-sided singles of the period. Critic Dave Marsh put the song in his book The Heart of Rock and Soul: The 1001 Greatest Singles Ever Made. Noting that James had recorded the song during a break from heroin addiction, Marsh writes, "the song provides a great metaphor for her drug addiction and intensifies the story."

== Personnel ==
- Carl Banks – organ
- Charles Chalmers – tenor saxophone
- Roger Hawkins – drums
- David Hood – bass
- Jimmy Johnson – guitar
- Junior Lowe – guitar
- Gene "Bowlegs" Miller – trumpet
- Floyd Newman – baritone saxophone
- Spooner Oldham – piano
- Aaron Varnell – tenor saxophone

== Certifications ==
| Region | Certification | Certified units/sales |
|---|---|---|
| Denmark (IFPI Danmark) | Gold | 45,000^{‡} |
| New Zealand (RMNZ) | Platinum | 30,000^{‡} |
| Spain (PROMUSICAE) | Gold | 30,000^{‡} |
| United Kingdom (BPI) | Gold | 400,000^{‡} |
^{‡} Sales+streaming figures based on certification alone.

== Other versions ==
It has since been recorded by a wide variety of artists, including the blind-from-birth Clarence Carter, on his 1969 album The Dynamic Clarence Carter. Other recordings include those by Little Milton, Chicken Shack, Koko Taylor, Sydney Youngblood, Man Man, Rod Stewart, B.B. King, Elkie Brooks, Paul Weller, Trixie Whitley, Ruby Turner, Marcia Ball, Barbara Lynn, and Beyoncé for the Cadillac Records film soundtrack.

The song reached number 14 on the UK Singles Chart in 1969 in a version by the British blues band Chicken Shack, featuring Christine Perfect, later to become Christine McVie of Fleetwood Mac. After she left Chicken Shack, but before she joined Fleetwood Mac, Christine Perfect released her debut solo album, Christine Perfect. Being that she was on the same label as Chicken Shack, the Blue Horizon label included the same Chicken Shack recording of "I'd Rather Go Blind" on Christine Perfect's album since the song had only been released as a single for Chicken Shack and had not been included on any Chicken Shack LPs.

The song was also recorded in 1972 for Never a Dull Moment, the fourth album by Rod Stewart. Etta James refers to Stewart's version favorably in her autobiography, Rage to Survive.

Versions have been performed by Paolo Nutini, Australian musician Toby, and American folk singer Holly Miranda.

In 2011, Joe Bonamassa and Beth Hart included the song on their album Don't Explain. At the 2012 Kennedy Center Honors concert honoring Buddy Guy, Beth Hart received a standing ovation for a rendition of the song accompanied by Jeff Beck on guitar.

In 2012, Mick Hucknall recorded the song for his album American Soul.

The near note-for-note rendition of the song's melody can be heard in Chris Stapleton's 2015 track "Tennessee Whiskey".

In 2018, Grace Potter recorded the song at FAME Studios for the tribute album Muscle Shoals...Small Town, Big Sound.
