= Next to You =

Next to You or Next 2 You may refer to:

== Songs ==
- "Next to You" (The Police song), 1978, covered by The Offspring and by Ednaswap
- "Next to You", by Paula Abdul from Forever Your Girl, 1988
- "Next to You (Someday I'll Be)", a song by Wilson Phillips from their self-titled album, 1990
- "Next to You" (Darude song), 2003
- "Next to You", by Ciara featuring R. Kelly from Ciara's album Goodies, 2004
- "Next to You" (Melody song), 2005
- "Next 2 You" (Buckcherry song), 2006
- "Next to You", by Jordin Sparks from Jordin Sparks, 2007
- "Next to You" (Mike Jones song), 2008
- "Next to You" (Chris Brown song), 2011
- "Next to You" (L D R U song), 2016
- "Next to You", by Little Big Town from Nightfall, 2020
- "Next to you", a song by Craig Dillingham (1985)
- "Next to You", a song by Twista, 2016
- "Next to You, Next to Me", a 1990 song by Shenandoah from Extra Mile (album)
- "Wake Up (Next to You)" (Graham Parker song), 1985

== Other ==
- Next to You (Tammy Wynette album), 1989
- Next to You (film), a 2018 Peruvian romantic comedy film
