= WERH =

WERH refers to the following broadcasting stations in the United States:

- WERH (AM), a defunct radio station (970 AM) formerly licensed to Hamilton, Alabama
- WERH-FM, a defunct radio station (92.1 FM) formerly licensed to Hamilton, Alabama
