= Tell Mama =

Studio album by Etta James
- Released: February 1968
- Recorded: August 22 – December 6, 1967; FAME Studios, Muscle Shoals, Alabama
- Genre: Soul, R&B, blues
- Length: 29:39
- Label: Cadet (original release); MCA/Chess (re-release)
- Producer: Rick Hall

Etta James chronology
Call My Name (1967)	Tell Mama (1968)	Etta James Sings Funk (1970)

Singles from Tell Mama
- 1. "Tell Mama" Released: 1967; 2. "Security" Released: 1968

Tell Mama is the seventh studio album by American singer Etta James. Her second album release for Cadet Records, produced by Rick Hall at his FAME Studios in Muscle Shoals, Alabama, it was James's first album since 1964 to enter the Billboard 200 chart. It contained her first Top 10 R&B hits since 1964 – the title cut and "Security". The "Tell Mama" single gave James her all-time highest Billboard Hot 100 position, reaching number 23.

== Background ==
Tell Mama was recorded at the FAME Studios in Muscle Shoals, Alabama, on the encouragement of Leonard Chess. Allmusic reviewer, Bill Dahl praised the album's production, called its sessions, "skin-tight." At Muscle Shoals, producers were able to mix her voice in order for it to sound stronger on previously distorted high notes. The album's title track became one of the biggest hits of James's career, becoming her first Top 10 hit in four years and her highest-peaking single on the Billboard Pop chart, reaching #23. It has since been considered one of her all-time classics. The album's cover of Otis Redding's "Security" also became a major hit, reaching the Top 20 on the R&B singles chart, while also making the Pop Top 40.

Besides a cover version of Redding's composition, other cover versions included Jimmy Hughes's "Don't Lose Your Good Thing" and a pair of copyrights by Don Covay. It also featured the title track's B-side, "I'd Rather Go Blind," which was originally not a hit, however it later became one of James's signature songs. In the 1990s, Tell Mama was remastered and re-released on MCA/Chess. The album was remastered by Erick Labson at Universal Mastering Studios-West in North Hollywood, California. A compilation version of the album was later released and included ten additional bonus tracks, including cover versions of David Houston's, "Almost Persuaded" and Sonny & Cher's "I Got You Babe."

== Legacy ==
In a retrospective review for AllMusic, Bill Dahl felt the album to be "one of her best and most soul-searing Cadet albums." Dahl called the title track "relentlessly driving" and "I'd Rather Go Blind," "a moving soul ballad." He also said that the album's producers, "really did themselves proud behind Miss Peaches."

In 2000 it was voted number 667 in Colin Larkin's All Time Top 1000 Albums.

James' cover of "I Got You Babe" was featured in a 2021 TV commercial for Walmart.

== Track listing ==
Side one

1. "Tell Mama" – (Clarence Carter, Marcus Daniel, Wilbur Terrell) 2:20 (also released as a single: Cadet 5578a)
2. "I'd Rather Go Blind" – (Billy Foster, Ellington Jordan, Etta James) 2:33 (Cadet 5578b)
3. "Watch Dog" – (Don Covay) 2:06
4. "The Love of My Man" – (Ed Townsend) 2:37
5. "I'm Gonna Take What He's Got" – (Don Covay) 2:32 (Cadet 5594b)
6. "The Same Rope" – (Leonard Caston Jr., Lloyd Webster) 2:39

Side two

1. "Security" – (Otis Redding) 2:44 (Cadet 5594a)
2. "Steal Away" – (Jimmy Hughes) 2:19 (Cadet 5630b)
3. "My Mother In-Law" – (George David, Lee Diamond) 2:20
4. "Don't Lose Your Good Thing" – (Rick Hall, Spooner Oldham) 2:26
5. "It Hurts Me So Much" – (Charles Chalmers) 2:34
6. "Just a Little Bit" – (Rosco Gordon) 2:11

Bonus tracks

1. "Do Right Woman, Do Right Man - (Chips Moman, Dan Penn)"
2. "You Took It"
3. "I Worship the Ground You Walk On" (Cadet 5606b)
4. "I Got You Babe" (Cadet 5606a)
5. "You Got It" (Cadet 5620a)
6. "I've Gone Too Far"
7. "Misty"
8. "Almost Persuaded" (Cadet 5630a)
9. "Fire" (Cadet 5620b)
10. "Do Right Woman, Do Right Man (Alternate Version)"

== Personnel ==
- Etta James – lead vocals
- Gene "Bowlegs" Miller – trumpet
- James Mitchell, Aaron Varnell – tenor saxophone
- Floyd Newman – baritone saxophone
- George Davis, Spooner Oldham – keyboards
- Carl Banks, Barry Beckett – organ
- Marvell Thomas – piano
- Jimmy Ray Johnson, Albert S. Lowe Jr – guitar
- David Hood – bass guitar
- Roger Hawkins – drums
- Charles Chalmers – background vocals

== Chart positions ==
Album

Chart performance for Tell Mama
Chart (1968)	Peak position
US Billboard 200	82
US Top R&B/Hip-Hop Albums (Billboard)	21

Chart (2026)	Peak position
US Top Blues Albums (Billboard)	4

Singles - Billboard (United States)

Year	Single	Chart	Position
1967	"Tell Mama"	R&B Singles	10
1967	"Tell Mama"	Pop Singles	23
1967	"Security"	R&B Singles	11
1967	"Security"	Pop Singles	35
