= I Want to Be Loved =

I Want to Be Loved may refer to:

- "I Want to Be Loved (But Only by You)", a 1947 song written and performed by Savannah Churchill
- "I Wanna Be Loved", a 1933 popular song written by Johnny Green, Edward Heyman and Billy Rose
- "I Want to Be Loved", a 1955 blues song written by Willie Dixon, performed by Muddy Waters and the Rolling Stones
- "I Want to Be Loved", a song by Bon Jovi on their 2005 album Have a Nice Day

== See also ==
- I Wanna Be Loved by You, a song written by Herbert Stothart and Harry Ruby, with lyrics by Bert Kalmar, for the 1928 musical Good Boy
- I Want to Be Loved Like That, a country music song written by Phil Barnhart, Sam Hogin and Bill LaBounty
