= The Road Not Taken (album) =

Studio album by Shenandoah
- Released: January 31, 1989
- Recorded: 1988
- Studio: Fame Recording Studios; Muscle Shoals, Alabama
- Genre: Country
- Length: 35:32
- Label: Columbia Nashville
- Producer: Robert Byrne; Rick Hall

Shenandoah chronology
Shenandoah (1987)	The Road Not Taken (1989)	Extra Mile (1990)

Singles from The Road Not Taken
- 1. "Mama Knows" Released: August 1988; 2. "The Church on Cumberland Road" Released: January 1989; 3. "Sunday in the South" Released: May 1989; 4. "Two Dozen Roses" Released: August 1989; 5. "See If I Care" Released: January 1990

Professional ratings
Review scores
Source	Rating
Allmusic	link

The Road Not Taken is the second studio album by American country music group Shenandoah and their most successful album to date. Of the six singles released from 1988 to 1990, all charted within the top ten and three of those, "The Church on Cumberland Road", "Sunday in the South", and "Two Dozen Roses" were number 1 songs on both the U.S. and Canadian country charts. Also included on the disc is "She Doesn't Cry Anymore", a single from the band's self-titled debut from 1987.

== Track listing ==
No.	Title	Writer(s)	Length
1.	"Sunday in the South"	Jay Booker	4:11
2.	"Two Dozen Roses"	Robert Byrne, Mac McAnally	3:42
3.	"See If I Care"	Walt Aldridge, Byrne	3:14
4.	"Mama Knows"	Tony Haselden, Tim Mensy	3:22
5.	"She Doesn't Cry Anymore"	Byrne, Will Robinson	3:38
6.	"The Road Not Taken"	Rick Bowles, Byrne	3:56
7.	"The Church on Cumberland Road"	Bob DiPiero, John Scott Sherrill, Dennis Robbins	2:58
8.	"Changes"	Billy Henderson, Billy Maddox	3:41
9.	"She's All I've Got Going"	McAnally	3:40
10.	"Hard Country"	Bowles, Byrne	3:10

== Release history ==
Year	Type	Label	Catalogue
1989	Cassette	Columbia/CBS	FCT-44468
1989	CD	Columbia/CBS	CK-44468

== Personnel ==
Shenandoah

- Marty Raybon (vocals, rhythm guitar)
- Jim Seales (lead guitar)
- Stan Thorn (keyboards)
- Ralph Ezell (bass guitar)
- Mike McGuire (drums)

Additional musicians

- Walt Aldridge
- Wayne Bridges
- Robert Byrne
- Vassar Clements
- Bill Darnell
- Paul Franklin
- Owen Hale
- Bill Hinds
- Lenny LeBlanc
- Mac McAnally
- Steve Nathan
- Hershey Reeves
- Milton Sledge
- John Willis

Technical

- Robert Byrne - production, engineering
- Pete Greene - engineering
- Rick Hall - production, engineering
- M. C. Rather - engineering
- Alan Schulman - engineering

== Charts ==
=== Weekly charts ===
Chart (1989)	Peak position
Canadian Country Albums (RPM)	10
US Top Country Albums (Billboard)	6

=== Year-end charts ===
Chart (1989)	Position
US Top Country Albums (Billboard)	18
Chart (1990)	Position
US Top Country Albums (Billboard)	18

== Certifications ==
Region	Certification	Certified units/sales
United States (RIAA)	Gold	500,000^{^}
^{^} Shipments figures based on certification alone.
