= Hey Mister (I Need This Job) =

Single by Shenandoah

from the album Long Time Comin'
- B-side: "There Ain't No Beverly Hills in Tennessee"
- Released: August 8, 1992
- Genre: Country
- Length: 3:30
- Label: RCA Nashville
- Songwriters: Kerry Chater, Renee Armand
- Producers: Robert Byrne, Keith Stegall

Shenandoah singles chronology
"Rock My Baby" (1992)	"Hey Mister (I Need This Job)" (1992)	"Leavin's Been a Long Time Comin'" (1992)

"Hey Mister (I Need This Job)" is a song recorded by American country music group Shenandoah. It was released in August 1992 as the second single from the album Long Time Comin'. The song reached #28 on the Billboard Hto Country Singles & Tracks chart. The song was written by Kerry Chater and Renee Armand.

== Critical reception ==
An uncredited review in Cash Box was positive, stating that it "will remind country listeners of what Shenandoah is all about. Orchestrated morality, family values, and rural mores."

== Chart performance ==
Chart (1992)	Peak position
US Hot Country Songs (Billboard)	28
Canadian RPM Country Tracks	22
