= Shenandoah (album) =

Studio album by Shenandoah
- Released: September 1987
- Recorded: November 1986
- Studio: Fame Recording Studios, Muscle Shoals, Alabama
- Genre: Country
- Label: Columbia Nashville
- Producer: Robert Byrne; Rick Hall

Shenandoah chronology
Shenandoah (1987)	The Road Not Taken (1989)

Singles from Shenandoah
- 1. "They Don't Make Love Like We Used To" Released: May 1987; 2. "Stop the Rain" Released: December 12, 1987; 3. "She Doesn't Cry Anymore" Released: March 1988

Shenandoah is the debut studio album by American country music band Shenandoah. Released in 1987 on Columbia Records, it includes three singles: "They Don't Make Love Like We Used To" and "Stop the Rain." "Stop the Rain" was the band's first Top 40 country hit, peaking at #28 on Billboard Hot Country Singles (now Hot Country Songs). "She Doesn't Cry Anymore" carried over to the band's 1989 album The Road Not Taken, being released as a single from it.

== Track listing ==
No.	Title	Writer(s)	Length
1.	"Stop the Rain"	Wayland Holyfield, Richard Leigh	3:40
2.	"She Doesn't Cry Anymore"	Robert Byrne, Will Robinson	3:37
3.	"It Ain't Love Til It Hurts"	Waylon Caylor, Billy Henderson	3:42
4.	"The Show Must Go On"	Steven Dale Jones, Mike McGuire	3:18
5.	"They Don't Make Love Like We Used To"	John Rainey Adkins, Billy Henderson, George Rogers	3:15
6.	"What She Wants"	Bob Garfrerick, Billy Maddox, Henderson	3:14
7.	"She's Still Here"	Jim Seales	2:56
8.	"I'm Gonna Hurt Her on the Radio"	Tom Brasfield, Mac McAnally	2:55
9.	"Lily of the Alley"	Jones, McGuire, Marty Raybon	3:59
10.	"Can't Stop Now"	Gary Nicholson, Wendy Waldman	3:43

== Personnel ==
=== Shenandoah ===
- Ralph Ezell - bass guitar
- Mike McGuire - percussion, background vocals
- Marty Raybon - lead vocals
- Jim Seales - electric guitar, background vocals
- Stan Thorn - keyboards

=== Additional Musicians ===
- Walt Aldridge - electric guitar, background vocals
- Kenny Bell - acoustic guitar
- Robert Byrne - acoustic guitar, percussion, background vocals
- Duncan Cameron - steel guitar, Dobro
- Chalmers Davis - keyboards
- Paul Franklin - dobro
- Owen Hale - drums
- Rick Hall - background vocals
- Steve Jones - background vocals
- Mac McAnally - acoustic guitar
- Kenny Mims - electric guitar
- Steve Nathan - keyboards
- Jack Peck - trumpet
