= Mick Hayes (musician) =

American blues and rock musician (born 1978)

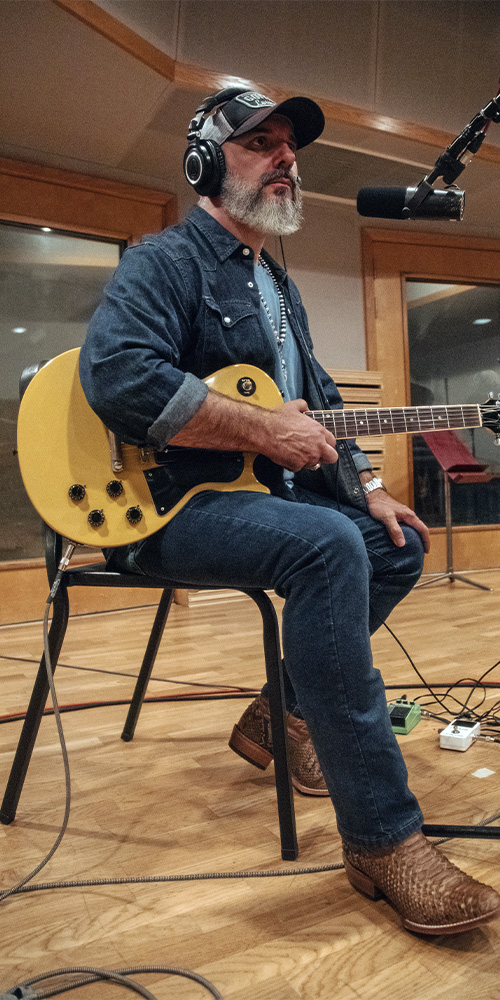
- Mick Hayes in studio, 2024

Background information
- Born: June 17, 1978 (age 48); Buffalo, New York, U.S.
- Origin: East Aurora, New York, U.S.
- Genres: Blues, Rock, Americana
- Occupations: Singer-songwriter, guitarist
- Instruments: Guitar, vocals
- Years active: 1990s–present
- Label: Independent
- Website: mickhayesmusic.com

Mick Hayes (born June 17, 1978) is an American blues, rock, and Americana singer-songwriter and guitarist from Buffalo, New York. Based in Franklin, Tennessee, he has been recognized by the Grammy Nomination Committee in multiple categories, performed with artists including Stevie Wonder and Joe Bonamassa, and released ten albums of original material. His 2020 album My Claim to Fame, recorded at FAME Studios in Muscle Shoals, Alabama, received positive reviews from multiple independent publications.

== Early life ==
Hayes was born in 1978 in Buffalo, New York and grew up in Lackawanna, New York and East Aurora, New York. He began playing guitar at the age of seven, learning from 45 rpm records his parents gave him. Hayes started performing live at 16 with local bands and headlined his first festival at 23.

== Career ==
Hayes began his career performing locally in New York while working as an auto mechanic by day. He expanded regionally, touring in New York, Pennsylvania, Ohio, and Canada. By his early twenties, he had formed his own band and was performing nationally.

He later relocated to Atlanta, Georgia to further his career in the Southeast, and appeared on television shows including Confessions of a Matchmaker and Season 6 of American Idol. After returning to New York, Hayes continued to perform along the East Coast and in Canada, opening for acts such as the Doobie Brothers, Deep Purple, Cheap Trick, and Peter Frampton.

== Albums and Collaborations ==
Since 2003, Hayes has released ten albums of original material. His 2020 release, My Claim to Fame, was recorded at FAME Studios in Muscle Shoals, Alabama, and received positive reviews from critics. The album featured members of the Muscle Shoals Rhythm Section and blended blues with soul influences.

Hayes has collaborated with jazz musician Najee, contributing to his album Guitar&B. In 2025, Hayes began releasing singles from his upcoming album Lies & Letdowns, produced by Joe Bonamassa and Josh Smith (musician).

== Recent Work ==
In 2023, Hayes relocated to Franklin, Tennessee, then in 2024 started to work on his upcoming album Lies & Letdowns, produced by Joe Bonamassa and Josh Smith (musician). The album also features Reese Wynans, Lemar Carter, Calvin Turner, and Jade Macrae. He has released singles from the project, including “Checkered Past,” and continues to perform live in the United States. Hayes remains an active touring artist, appearing at blues festivals and intimate venues, and has continued to build his fan base through regular live performances and new studio releases.

== Discography ==
- Michael...The Other Side of Me (2005)
- Segue EP (2005)
- Live at the Tap Room (2005)
- Self-Titled (2009)
- Recovery EP (2011)
- Cafe Artistry Live (2012)
- The Fuse (2016)
- GUITAR&B (2016)
- Medley 2005–2017 (2017)
- My Claim to Fame (2020)
- Lies & Letdowns (upcoming, 2026)
