= Extra Mile (album) =

Studio album by Shenandoah
- Released: May 2, 1990
- Recorded: 1989–90
- Studios: Fame Recording Studios; Muscle Shoals, Alabama
- Genre: Country
- Length: 34:51
- Label: Columbia Nashville
- Producers: Robert Byrne; Rick Hall

Shenandoah chronology
The Road Not Taken (1989)	Extra Mile (1990)	Greatest Hits (1992)

Singles from Extra Mile
- 1. "Next to You, Next to Me" Released: June 1990; 2. "Ghost in This House" Released: September 20, 1990; 3. "I Got You" Released: January 1991; 4. "The Moon Over Georgia" Released: April 1991; 5. "When You Were Mine" Released: August 1991

Professional ratings
Review scores
Source	Rating
Entertainment Weekly	B link

Extra Mile is the third studio album by the American country music band Shenandoah. It was released May 2, 1990 (see 1990 in country music) on Columbia Records. Their final album for the label, it produced five chart singles on the Billboard country charts. In order of release, these were "Next to You, Next to Me", "Ghost in This House", "I Got You", "The Moon Over Georgia" and "When You Were Mine". "Next to You, Next to Me" was the band's fourth Number One, and all the others except "When You Were Mine" were Top Ten hits. Extra Mile is certified gold by the RIAA.

== Track listing ==
No.	Title	Writer(s)	Length
1.	"Next to You, Next to Me"	Robert Ellis Orrall, Curtis Wright	3:38
2.	"Ghost in This House"	Hugh Prestwood	3:36
3.	"She Makes the Coming Home (Worth the Being Gone)"	Rory Bourke, Mike Reid	3:29
4.	"She's a Natural"	Lionel Cartwright	3:28
5.	"I Got You"	Robert Byrne, Teddy Gentry, Greg Fowler	3:45
6.	"Puttin' New Roots Down"	Larry Cordle, Larry Shell	3:00
7.	"When You Were Mine"	Byrne, Gene Nelson	3:03
8.	"Goin' Down with My Pride"	Byrne, Susan Longacre	3:34
9.	"The Moon Over Georgia"	Mark Narmore	3:13
10.	"Daddy's Little Man"	Billy Maddox, Mike McGuire	3:45

== Personnel ==
As listed in liner notes.

Shenandoah

- Ralph Ezell – bass guitar, backing vocals
- Mike McGuire – drums, backing vocals
- Marty Raybon – lead vocals
- Jim Seales – electric guitar, backing vocals
- Stan Thorn – keyboards, backing vocals

Other musicians

- Mickey Buckins – percussion
- Robert Byrne – acoustic and electric guitars
- Bill Darnell – backing vocals
- Paul Franklin – pedal steel guitar, Dobro
- Owen Hale – drums
- Rick Hall – backing vocals
- Carl Jackson – acoustic guitar
- Lenny LeBlanc – bass guitar, backing vocals
- Mac McAnally – acoustic guitar
- Steve Nathan – keyboards
- Mark O'Connor – fiddle, mandolin
- John Willis – acoustic guitar

== Charts ==
=== Weekly charts ===
Chart (1990–91)	Peak position
US Billboard 200	186
US Top Country Albums (Billboard)	11

=== Year-end charts ===
Chart (1990)	Position
US Top Country Albums (Billboard)	37
Chart (1991)	Position
US Top Country Albums (Billboard)	31

== Certifications ==
Region	Certification	Certified units/sales
United States (RIAA)	Gold	500,000^{^}
^{^} Shipments figures based on certification alone.
