= Long Time Comin' =

Studio album by Shenandoah
- Released: May 12, 1992
- Recorded: Late 1991 & Early 92.
- Genre: Country
- Length: 29:31
- Label: RCA Nashville
- Producer: Robert Byrne; Keith Stegall

Shenandoah chronology
Greatest Hits (1992)	Long Time Comin' (1992)	Under the Kudzu (1993)

Singles from Long Time Comin'
- 1. "Rock My Baby" Released: March 23, 1992; 2. "Hey Mister (I Need This Job)" Released: August 8, 1992; 3. "Leavin's Been a Long Time Comin'" Released: November 16, 1992

Professional ratings
Review scores
Source	Rating
Allmusic	link

Long Time Comin' is the fourth studio album by the American country music band Shenandoah. Released in May 1992 (see 1992 in country music), it was their first album for the RCA Nashville label. The album includes three singles: "Rock My Baby", "Hey Mister (I Need This Job)" and "Leavin's Been a Long Time Comin'". Respectively, these peaked at #2, #28 and #15 on the Billboard country singles charts in 1992.

== Track listing ==
No.	Title	Writer(s)	Length
1.	"Rock My Baby"	Curtis Wright, Bill Spencer, Phil Whitley	3:07
2.	"Hey Mister (I Need This Job)"	Renée Armand, Kerry Chater	3:30
3.	"Leavin's Been a Long Time Comin'"	Mike McGuire, Charlie Craig, Stowe Dailey	3:23
4.	"Same Old Heart"	Mac McAnally	3:23
5.	"Right Where I Belong"	Rick Bowles, Josh Leo	3:27
6.	"I Was Young Once Too"	Richard Leigh, Robert Byrne	2:50
7.	"Give Me Five Minutes"	Robert Ellis Orrall	2:52
8.	"Wednesday Night Prayer Meeting"	Billy Maddox, Paul Thorn	3:41
9.	"Rattle the Windows"	Troy Seals, Eddie Setser, Jerry Phillips	2:44
10.	"There Ain't No Beverly Hills in Tennessee"	Bud McGuire, Marty Raybon	3:24^{A}

- ^{A}Omitted from cassette version.

== Chart performance ==
Chart (1992)	Peak position
U.S. Billboard Top Country Albums	34
Canadian RPM Country Albums	14
