= See If I Care (song) =

Single by Shenandoah

from the album The Road Not Taken
- B-side: "Lily of the Valley"
- Released: January 1990
- Genre: Country
- Length: 3:14
- Label: Columbia Nashville
- Songwriters: Walt Aldridge; Robert Byrne
- Producers: Robert Byrne; Rick Hall

Shenandoah singles chronology
"Two Dozen Roses" (1989)	"See If I Care" (1990)	"Next to You, Next to Me" (1990)

"See If I Care" is a song written by Walt Aldridge and Robert Byrne, and recorded by American country music group Shenandoah. It was released in January 1990 as the fifth single from their album The Road Not Taken. The song reached number 6 on the Billboard Hot Country Singles & Tracks chart in May 1990. It also peaked at number 5 on the Canadian RPM Country Tracks chart.

== Chart performance ==
Chart (1990)	Peak position
Canada Country Singles (RPM)	5
US Hot Country Songs (Billboard)	6

=== Year-end charts ===
Chart (1990)	Position
Canada Country Tracks (RPM)	74
