= Tell Mama (song) =

Song performed by Etta James

"Tell Mama" is a song written by Clarence Carter, Marcus Daniel and Wilbur Terrell (though some recordings give the sole songwriting credit to Carter). It is best known in its 1967 recording by Etta James. An earlier version of the song was first recorded in 1966 by Carter, as "Tell Daddy".

== Clarence Carter version - "Tell Daddy" ==
Carter co-wrote "Tell Daddy", and recorded it at the FAME Studios in Muscle Shoals, Alabama, on 4 October 1966. His recording, released on the Fame label, became Carter's first chart hit, reaching No. 35 on the Billboard R&B chart in early 1967.

== Etta James version - "Tell Mama" ==
"Tell Mama"

Single by Etta James

from the album Tell Mama
- A-side: "Tell Mama"
- B-side: "I'd Rather Go Blind"
- Released: October 1967
- Recorded: August 1967, FAME Studios, Muscle Shoals, Alabama
- Genre: Southern soul
- Length: 2:20
- Label: Cadet 5578
- Songwriter: Clarence Carter
- Producer: Rick Hall

Etta James singles chronology
""I Prefer You"" (1967)	"Tell Mama" (1967)	""Security"" (1968)

Etta James was persuaded by Chess Records' executive Leonard Chess to record her second album for his company (on the Cadet label) at the FAME Studios in Muscle Shoals, Alabama: impressed by the studio's pedigree - FAME having generated a recent string of hits by the likes of Aretha Franklin, Wilson Pickett and Percy Sledge - Chess was also motivated to send James to rural Alabama so as to remove her from the urban environment which had recently fostered the singer's substance abuse issues to the point of hospitalization and incarceration.

In sessions produced by FAME owner Rick Hall, with personnel including Spooner Oldham on piano, Carl Banks on organ, Jimmy Johnson and Junior Lowe on guitar, David Hood on bass, Roger Hawkins on drums, Gene "Bowlegs" Miller on trumpet, Aaron Varnell and Charles Chalmers on tenor sax, and Floyd Newman on baritone sax (many of whom had played on Clarence Carter tracks), James recorded the album Tell Mama between August and December 1967, with the title cut recorded in the inaugural 22–24 August sessions. Rick Hall had to insist on James recording Carter's "Tell Daddy" as "Tell Mama", over James' objections such as "it's not a hit and it's driving me crazy."

With the original version of "I'd Rather Go Blind" as B-side, "Tell Mama" was released on the Cadet label in October 1967 as its parent album's advance single. Debuting on the R&B chart in November 1967, "Tell Mama" would peak there at number 10, while the track would afford James her all-time highest Pop ranking with a Billboard Hot 100 peak of number 23.

Rick Hall would recall a backstage visit at the Troubadour where Etta James was headlining during "Tell Mama"'s chart run: "She grabbed me and hugged me and cried:'Rick Hall, I love you! I'm so glad you made me do that damn song! It brought my career back to life and I'll always be grateful.'" However the track's success evidently did not totally assuage James' misgivings: she would state in her 2003 memoir Rage to Survive:

"There are folks who think 'Tell Mama' is the Golden Moment of the Golden Age of Soul; they rant and rave about the snappy horn chart and the deep-pocket guitar groove, about how I sang the shit out of it. I wish I could agree. Sure, the song made me money. It warmed Leonard Chess's heart to see the thing cross over to the pop charts, where it lingered for a long while. You might even say it became a classic. But I have to confess that it was never a favorite of mine. Never liked it. Never liked singing it - not then, not now. I almost never perform it. It's not that I don't admire the chart and the songwriter. Clarence Carter... is great. Maybe it's just that I didn't like being cast in the role of the Great Earth Mother, the gal you come to for comfort and easy sex. Nothing was easy back then...."

=== Chart performance ===
Chart (1967–68)	Peak position
US Billboard Hot 100	23
US Best Selling R&B Singles (Billboard)	10

== Other versions ==
- The song was recorded by Martha Veléz on her 1969 album Fiends and Angels.
- Janis Joplin, who greatly admired Etta James, sang this song at Festival Express in Toronto in 1970. The song was featured in the film about the tour.
- Terri Gibbs reached No. 65 on the Country chart with her November 1983 single release of "Tell Mama"; the track was taken from Gibbs' Over Easy album which had been recorded in the spring of 1983 at FAME Studios with producer Rick Hall - the same locale and producer as the Etta James version of "Tell Mama".
- The Clarence Carter version was recorded by the Soul Survivors with Duane Allman providing the session guitar work in 1969.
- The song was also later recorded by Diana Ross, and included on some versions of her 1987 album Red Hot Rhythm & Blues.
- A cover recorded by Mersh Bros. Band is featured during the credits of the 1996 comedy film Carpool.
- Vaneese Thomas, sister of Marvell Thomas who played keyboards on Etta James' version of "Tell Mama", recorded the song in 2009 for Soul Sister Vol. 1, a tribute album to R&B vocalists.
- The song was recorded by the Civil Wars on their second album.
