= Two of a Kind, Workin' on a Full House =

1991 single by Garth Brooks

"Two of a Kind (Workin' on a Full House)"

Single by Dennis Robbins
- B-side: "The Church on Cumberland Road"
- Released: August 31, 1987
- Recorded: April 1987
- Genre: Country
- Length: 2:39
- Label: MCA
- Songwriters: Dennis Robbins, Bobby Boyd, Warren Haynes
- Producers: Emory Gordy Jr. Buzz Stone

Dennis Robbins singles chronology
"Long Gone Lonesome Blues" (1986)	"Two of a Kind (Workin' on a Full House)" (1987)	"Home Sweet Home" (1992)

"Two of a Kind (Workin' on a Full House)" is a song co-written by Warren Haynes, Dennis Robbins, and Bobby Boyd. It was originally recorded by Robbins himself in 1987 for MCA Records and charted at number 71 on the Billboard country charts. The B-side to Robbins' version was "The Church on Cumberland Road," which was later a number-one hit in 1989 for Shenandoah.

== Content ==
The song is a moderate up-tempo with a fiddle intro. Its lyrics describe the relationship between the narrator and his wife, whom he considers a perfect complement. The title is a double entendre, using poker hands to describe how well the couple complements each other, and that they plan to have children.

In his book Redneck Liberation: Country Music as Theology, author David Fillingim cited "Two of a Kind, Workin' on a Full House" as an "upbeat honky-tonk romp" that showed his "more traditional country music styles".

== Chart positions ==
Chart (1987)	Peak position
U.S. Billboard Hot Country Singles	71

== Garth Brooks version ==
"Two of a Kind, Workin' on a Full House"

Single by Garth Brooks

from the album No Fences
- B-side: "Unanswered Prayers"
- Released: January 1991
- Recorded: 1990
- Studio: Jack's Tracks (Nashville, Tennessee)
- Genre: Country
- Length: 2:31
- Label: Capitol Nashville 44701
- Songwriters: Dennis Robbins, Bobby Boyd, Warren Haynes
- Producer: Allen Reynolds

Garth Brooks singles chronology
"Unanswered Prayers" (1990)	"Two of a Kind, Workin' on a Full House" (1991)	"The Thunder Rolls" (1991)

With a title change, removing the parentheses from "Workin' on a Full House," American country music artist Garth Brooks recorded the song for his second album No Fences in 1990. His rendition was released as the album's third single and his fifth consecutive number-one hit.

== Background and Production ==
Garth provided the following background information on the song in the CD booklet liner notes from The Hits:

This song came to me through Jon Northrup. He was doing a demo deal, and "Two of a Kind" was one of the four songs he was pitching for a demo. When I heard it, I said, "I wish you all the luck on your deal, but if for some reason it falls through, I'd love to have this." He called me three months later and told me I could have it if I wanted it. I immediately cut it. And to this day, even though it's a small song, it's one of the strongest parts of our live show. People just seem to connect with this song. This is a big point to writers and artists out there, especially myself, that sometimes intense gets the point across, but don't forget to show 'em your sense of humor.

== Chart positions ==
Chart (1991)	Peak position
Canada Country Singles (RPM)	1
US Hot Country Songs (Billboard)	1

=== Year-end charts ===
Chart (1991)	Position
Canada Country Tracks (RPM)	19
US Country Songs (Billboard)	15
