= In the Vicinity of the Heart =

Studio album by Shenandoah
- Released: November 15, 1994
- Genre: Country
- Length: 33:40
- Label: Liberty
- Producer: Don Cook

Shenandoah chronology
Under the Kudzu (1993)	In the Vicinity of the Heart (1994)	The Best of Shenandoah (1995)

Singles from In the Vicinity of the Heart
- 1. "Somewhere in the Vicinity of the Heart" Released: November 21, 1994; 2. "Darned If I Don't (Danged If I Do)" Released: April 10, 1995; 3. "Heaven Bound (I'm Ready)" Released: August 5, 1995; 4. "Always Have, Always Will" Released: January 1996

In the Vicinity of the Heart is the sixth studio album by the American country music band Shenandoah. Their only full studio album for Liberty Records, it was released in November 1994 (see 1994 in country music). It is also the final studio album to feature founding members Stan Thorn and Ralph Ezell.

== Content ==
The first single from the album, "Somewhere in the Vicinity of the Heart", features duet vocals from Alison Krauss. This song was Krauss' first Top 40 country hit, peaking at number 7 on the Billboard country charts in 1995. Following it were "Darned If I Don't (Danged If I Do)" at number 4 (it was also their last top 10 hit on the US Country charts), "Heaven Bound (I'm Ready)" at number 24, and "Always Have, Always Will" at number 40. "Heaven Bound (I'm Ready)" was previously recorded by the Oak Ridge Boys from their 1991 album Unstoppable, "Every Fire" was later recorded by Jason Sellers on his 1999 album A Matter of Time and Restless Heart on their 2004 album Still Restless and Neal McCoy on his 2012 album XII, "I Wouldn't Know" was recorded by Reba McEntire in 1998 for her album If You See Him, while "She Could Care Less" was later recorded by Joe Nichols on his 1996 self-titled debut.

== Critical reception ==
Jim Ridley of New Country magazine gave the album two-and-a-half stars out of five. He highlighted "I Wouldn't Know" and the title track as standouts for their production and vocal performances, but thought that the song selection otherwise followed too closely to that of Under the Kudzu and that the album did not seem to take any chances.

== Track listing ==
No.	Title	Writer(s)	Length
1.	"Darned If I Don't (Danged If I Do)"	Dean Dillon, Ronnie Dunn	2:29
2.	"Somewhere in the Vicinity of the Heart" (featuring Alison Krauss)	Bill LaBounty, Rick Chudacoff	4:05
3.	"Heaven Bound (I'm Ready)"	Dennis Linde	3:09
4.	"Always Have, Always Will"	Larry Boone, Paul Nelson, Woody Lee	3:50
5.	"Cabin Fever"	Marty Raybon, Bud McGuire, Lonnie Wilson	2:29
6.	"I Wouldn't Know"	Marc Beeson, Robert Byrne, Mike McGuire	3:33
7.	"Call It Love"	Tony Haselden	3:35
8.	"You Can Say That"	M. McGuire, Curtis Wright	3;22
9.	"Every Fire"	Cathy Majeski, John Scott Sherrill	3:51
10.	"She Could Care Less"	Billy Lawson	3:17

== Personnel ==
Shenandoah

- Ralph Ezell – bass guitar, background vocals
- Mike McGuire – drums, background vocals
- Marty Raybon – lead vocals, acoustic guitar
- Jim Seales – electric guitar, background vocals
- Stan Thorn – piano, keyboards, background vocals

Additional musicians

- Bruce Bouton – pedal steel guitar, slide guitar
- Dennis Burnside – piano, Hammond B-3 organ
- Mark Casstevens – acoustic guitar, ukulele
- Rob Hajacos – fiddle, "electric hoedown tools"
- John Barlow Jarvis – piano, synthesizer
- Alison Krauss – duet vocals on "Somewhere in the Vicinity of the Heart"
- Brent Mason – electric guitar
- John Wesley Ryles – background vocals
- Dennis Wilson – background vocals
- Lonnie Wilson – drums, percussion

== Chart performance ==
Chart (1994)	Peak position
U.S. Billboard Top Country Albums	31
U.S. Billboard 200	182
U.S. Billboard Top Heatseekers	11
