= Muscle Shoals (film) =

2013 American documentary film

- Muscle Shoals Theatrical Poster
- Directed by: Greg "Freddy" Camalier
- Produced by: Greg "Freddy" Camalier; Stephen M. Badger
- Starring: Bono; Clarence Carter; Jimmy Cliff; Aretha Franklin; Rick Hall; Roger Hawkins; David Hood; Mick Jagger; Jai Johanny Johanson; Donna Jean Godchaux; Jimmy Johnson; Alicia Keys; Ed King; Spooner Oldham; Dan Penn; Keith Richards; Percy Sledge; Candi Staton; John Paul White; Steve Winwood
- Cinematography: Anthony Arendt
- Edited by: Richard Lowe
- Distributed by: Magnolia Pictures
- Release dates: January 26, 2013 (Sundance Film Festival); September 27, 2013 (United States)
- Running time: 111 minutes
- Country: United States
- Language: English
- Box office: $524,288

Muscle Shoals is a 2013 American documentary film about FAME Studios in Muscle Shoals, Alabama, and the nearby Muscle Shoals Sound Studio. Directed by Greg "Freddy" Camalier, the film was released by Magnolia Pictures on September 27, 2013. It features numerous recording artists as well as the staff and musicians associated with the studios.

== Cast ==
- Gregg Allman
- Bono
- Clarence Carter
- Jimmy Cliff
- Aretha Franklin (final film appearance)
- Donna Jean Godchaux
- Rick Hall
- Roger Hawkins
- David Hood
- Mick Jagger
- Etta James
- Jai Johanny Johanson
- Jimmy Johnson
- Alicia Keys
- Ed King
- Spooner Oldham
- Dan Penn
- Keith Richards
- Percy Sledge
- Candi Staton
- John Paul White
- Steve Winwood
- Wilson Pickett

== Reception ==
Muscle Shoals has generally received positive reviews from critics. Katie Van Syckle of Rolling Stone remarked:

[T]he documentary’s real highlights are the musings of the musicians who recorded there. Performers including Aretha Franklin, Keith Richards, Mick Jagger, Jimmy Cliff, Ed King and Steve Winwood reflect on what went into creating the magical environment and the legendary recordings that it spawned. Artists were not only prolific in Colbert County, but their recordings were often infused with a recognizable sound Camalier describes as a "funky, soulful, propulsive kind of groove".

John DeFore of The Hollywood Reporter wrote, "The Next Must See Doc. A staple for Soul fans alongside 'Standing in the Shadows of Motown'." Film review aggregator Rotten Tomatoes reports that 97% of critics gave the film a positive review based on 69 reviews, with an average score of 7.6/10.

== Awards ==
- Grand Prize, Boulder International Film Festival
