= Rock My Baby =

Single by Shenandoah

from the album Long Time Comin'
- B-side: "Wednesday Night Prayer Meetin'"
- Released: March 23, 1992
- Genre: Country
- Length: 3:07
- Label: RCA Nashville
- Songwriters: Curtis Wright; Bill Spencer; Phil Whitley
- Producers: Robert Byrne; Keith Stegall

Shenandoah singles chronology
"When You Were Mine" (1991)	"Rock My Baby" (1992)	"Hey Mister (I Need This Job)" (1992)

"Rock My Baby" is a song written by Curtis Wright, Billy Spencer and Phil Whitley, and recorded by American country music group Shenandoah. It was released in March 1992 as the first single from their album Long Time Comin'. The song reached number two on the Billboard Hot Country Singles & Tracks chart in July, 1992, and peaked at number four in Canada.

== Music video ==
The music video was directed by Dale Heslip and premiered in early 1992.

== Chart performance ==
"Rock My Baby" debuted on the U.S. Billboard Hot Country Singles & Tracks for the week of April 4, 1992.

Chart (1992)	Peak position
Canada Country Singles (RPM)	4
US Hot Country Songs (Billboard)	2

=== Year-end charts ===
Chart (1992)	Position
Canada Country Tracks (RPM)	64
US Country Songs (Billboard)	24
