= Leavin's Been a Long Time Comin' =

Single by Shenandoah

from the album Long Time Comin'
- B-side: "I Was Young Once Too"
- Released: November 16, 1992
- Recorded: 1992
- Genre: Country
- Length: 3:23
- Label: RCA Nashville
- Songwriters: Charlie Craig, Stowe Dailey, Mike McGuire
- Producers: Robert Byrne, Keith Stegall

Shenandoah singles chronology
"Hey Mister (I Need This Job)" (1992)	"Leavin's Been a Long Time Comin'" (1992)	"Janie Baker's Love Slave" (1993)

"Leavin's Been a Long Time Comin'" is a song recorded by American country music group Shenandoah. It was released in November 1992 as the third and final single from their album Long Time Comin'. It peaked at number 15 in the United States, and number 24 in Canada. This song was written by Charlie Craig, Stowe Dailey and Mike McGuire.

== Critical reception ==
Deborah Evans Price, of Billboard magazine reviewed the song unfavorably, saying that Shenandoah is a "terrifically musical vocal group, but this song fails to knock the lights out." She goes on to say that production isn't "especially inventive either."

== Music video ==
The music video was directed by Marcus Penczner and premiered in late 1992. Filmed in black-and-white, the production was filmed at the Bedford County Courthouse in Shelbyville, Tennessee. The video features former Dallas Cowboys quarterback, Troy Aikman, who plays Cowboy Joe, the new gentleman friend of the woman playing the wife of Shenandoah lead singer Marty Raybon in a takeoff on a 1940s-vintage divorce trial. The judge is portrayed by Eddy Arnold. The wife of Raybon’s character was played by Tanda Fields. The story of this video is interspersed with scenes of Shenandoah performing this song in the courtroom (separate from the trial).

== Chart performance ==
"Leavin's Been a Long Time Comin'" debuted at number 62 on the U.S. Billboard Hot Country Singles & Tracks for the week of November 28, 1992.

Chart (1992–1993)	Peak position
Canada Country Singles (RPM)	24
US Hot Country Songs (Billboard)	15
