= Ellington Jordan =

American songwriter (1940–2020)

- Also known as: Fugi
- Born: 1940; Los Angeles, California
- Origin: Detroit, Michigan
- Died: June 18, 2020 (age 80); Fresno, California
- Genres: Psychedelic funk
- Occupation(s): Musician, songwriter, record producer
- Years active: 1960s-1970s, 1990s-2010s
- Labels: Cadet Records, Tuff City

Ellington Jordan (1940 – June 18, 2020), also known as Fugi, was an American musician, songwriter, and record producer based in Detroit, Michigan.

== Career ==
Ellington Jordan was originally from Los Angeles but moved to Detroit to start his music career. He began playing music in Detroit in the 1960s and collaborated with various local soul and funk musicians as a songwriter and sideman. In 1967 he co-wrote the blues song "I'd Rather Go Blind" for Etta James, based on his recent experiences in prison. The song was later covered by many artists including Rod Stewart and Beyonce.

In the late 1960s Jordan recorded as a one-man psychedelic funk act called Fugi, and released the song "Mary Don't Take Me on No Bad Trip" on Cadet Records (a subsidiary of Chess Records) in 1968. A full album of the same title was recorded, but was not released until 2005. It included Fugi's own version of "I'd Rather Go Blind". He was backed on the album by Black Merda, who were later signed to Chess at Jordan's suggestion. As Fugi, he signed with 20th Century Records in 1972 for a possible new album, though it was never released.

Jordan left music for several years and eventually relocated to Fresno, California. In 1994 he released a rap-oriented album called The Cold-Blooded City They Call the ‘No’ locally in Fresno under the Fugi name. In the early 2000s, interest in his music was revived when fans of lesser-known early funk music rediscovered "Mary Don't Take Me on No Bad Trip", and he benefited from his association with Black Merda when that band experienced a similar resurgence in popularity.

In 2005, the full album Mary Don't Take Me on No Bad Trip was released for the first time by Tuff City, and in the same year he released the new neo-soul album Almost Home. Jordan returned to occasional live performances, and collaborated with former members of Black Merda on new material in 2016-17. He died at age 80 in Fresno on June 18, 2020.

== Discography ==
- The Cold-Blooded City They Call the ‘No’ (1994)
- Mary Don't Take Me on No Bad Trip (2005; recorded 1968)
- Almost Home (2005)
