= Under the Kudzu =

Studio album by Shenandoah
- Released: July 27, 1993
- Recorded: Fall of 1992 & Early 1993 The Sound Shop Studio A; Nashville, Tennessee
- Genre: Country
- Length: 33:10
- Label: RCA Nashville
- Producer: Don Cook

Shenandoah chronology
| Long Time Comin' (1992) | Under the Kudzu (1993) | Super Hits (1994) |

Singles from Under the Kudzu
- 1. "Janie Baker's Love Slave" Released: May 24, 1993; 2. "I Want to Be Loved Like That" Released: September 27, 1993; 3. "If Bubba Can Dance (I Can Too)" Released: February 7, 1994; 4. "I'll Go Down Loving You" Released: June 1994

Under the Kudzu is the fifth studio album by American country music group Shenandoah. Released in 1993, it produced their fifth and last number one hit to date with "If Bubba Can Dance (I Can Too)", and first since “Next to You, Next to Me” in 1990. co-written by band members Marty Raybon, Mike McGuire and Bob McDill. Other singles included "Janie Baker's Love Slave", "I Want to Be Loved Like That", and "I'll Go Down Loving You". They charted at #15, #3 and #46, respectively. It is also the second and final album for the RCA Nashville label.

== Track listing ==
| No. | Title | Writer(s) | Length |
|---|---|---|---|
| 1. | "Janie Baker's Love Slave" | Dennis Linde | 3:13 |
| 2. | "If Bubba Can Dance (I Can Too)" | Marty Raybon, Mike McGuire, Bob McDill | 2:47 |
| 3. | "I Want to Be Loved Like That" | Phil Barnhart, Sam Hogin, Bill LaBounty | 3:43 |
| 4. | "One Kind of Woman I Like" | Raybon, M. McGuire, Don Cook | 3:10 |
| 5. | "Under the Kudzu" | Linde | 4:09 |
| 6. | "Nickel in the Well" | Chris Waters, Lonnie Wilson | 3:17 |
| 7. | "If It Takes Every Rib I've Got" | Raybon, Bud McGuire, Troy Seals | 3:10 |
| 8. | "I'll Go Down Loving You" | Chapin Hartford, Hogin, Monty Powell | 3:25 |
| 9. | "The Blues Are Comin' Over to Your House" | Cook, Kix Brooks | 2:31^{A} |
| 10. | "Just Say the Word" | M. McGuire | 3:45 |

- ^{A}Omitted from cassette version.

== Release history ==
| Year | Type | Label | Catalogue |
|---|---|---|---|
| 1993 | Cassette | RCA | 66267-4 |
| 1993 | CD | RCA | 66267-2 |

== Personnel ==
Shenandoah

- Marty Raybon - lead vocals, acoustic guitar
- Jim Seales - electric guitar, background vocals
- Stan Thorn - piano, keyboards, background vocals
- Ralph Ezell - bass guitar, background vocals
- Mike McGuire - drums, background vocals

Other musicians

- Bruce Bouton - steel guitar
- Dennis J. Burnside - piano
- Mark Casstevens - acoustic guitar
- Rob Hajacos - fiddle
- Brent Mason - electric guitar
- John Wesley Ryles - background vocals
- Tommy White - steel guitar
- Dennis Wilson - background vocals
- Lonnie Wilson - drums, percussion

== Production ==
- Don Cook: Producer
- Mike Bradley: Engineer, Mixing
- Mark Capps: Production Assistant, Assistant Engineer, Assistant Mixing
- Hank Williams: Mastering

== Chart performance ==
| Chart (1993) | Peak position |
|---|---|
| U.S. Billboard Top Country Albums | 38 |
| U.S. Billboard Top Heatseekers | 33 |
| Canadian RPM Country Albums | 8 |
