= WERH-FM =

- Hamilton, Alabama; United States
- Frequency: 92.1 MHz

Programming
- Format: Defunct (was Country)

Ownership
- Owner: Kate F. Fite
- Sister stations: WERH (AM)

History
- First air date: 1950
- Last air date: May 1, 2017
- Call sign meaning: "Where Entertainment Rates High"

Technical information
- Licensing authority: FCC
- Facility ID: 33473
- Class: A
- ERP: 3,000 watts
- HAAT: 37 meters (121 feet)

Links
- Public license information: Public file; LMS

WERH-FM (92.1 FM, "Country 92.1") was a radio station broadcasting a country music format. Formerly licensed to Hamilton, Alabama, United States, the station was licensed to Kate F. Fite.

Although Kate F. Fite was still listed as the station's licensee in the FCC database, she died on June 15, 2001, and the station's December 2003 license renewal application listed the licensee as "Kate F. Fite (deceased), Martha H. Fowler, & Megan Summerford."

The station was assigned the WERH-FM call letters by the Federal Communications Commission on December 8, 1978.

On Monday, May 1, 2017, at 10:35 a.m., WERH-FM played its last song; "Abba Dabba Honeymoon", which is the first song the station played when it went on the air in 1950. The FCC cancelled the station's license on March 12, 2019, due to the station having been silent since signing off in 2017.
