= Darned If I Don't (Danged If I Do) =

Single by Shenandoah

from the album In the Vicinity of the Heart
- B-side: "Somewhere in the Vicinity of the Heart"
- Released: April 10, 1995
- Recorded: 1994
- Genre: Country
- Length: 2:29
- Label: Liberty
- Songwriters: Dean Dillon, Ronnie Dunn
- Producer: Don Cook

Shenandoah singles chronology
"Somewhere in the Vicinity of the Heart" (1994)	"Darned If I Don't (Danged If I Do)" (1995)	"Heaven Bound (I'm Ready)" (1995)

"Darned If I Don't (Danged If I Do)" is a song written by Dean Dillon and Ronnie Dunn, and recorded by American country music group Shenandoah. It was released in April 1995 as the second single from their album In the Vicinity of the Heart. It peaked at number 4 in the United States, and number 7 in Canada. It would be their last Top 10 Hit.

"Darned If I Don't" was nominated for the Grammy Award for Best Country Performance by a Duo or Group with Vocal at the Grammy Awards of 1995.

== Critical reception ==
Deborah Evans Price, of Billboard magazine reviewed the song unfavorably, telling the reader to look at the title and make up their own song because it is "bound to be more interesting than what is going on here." She goes on to say that while Shenandoah has released many quality singles, this is not one of them.

== Music video ==
The music video was directed by Steven Goldmann, and has seven acts in a play stage style, involving the lead singer and his girlfriend. They meet, then they get married, but it turns out that the lead singer was only daydreaming while looking at her. This was also the last video to feature Stan Thorn, who was a member of the band from 1984 to 1995 before he left to pursue a career in jazz.

== Chart performance ==
"Darned If I Don't (Danged If I Do)" debuted at number 68 on the U.S. Billboard Hot Country Singles & Tracks for the week of April 22, 1995.

Chart (1995)	Peak position
Canada Country Singles (RPM)	7
US Hot Country Songs (Billboard)	4

=== Year-end charts ===
Chart (1995)	Position
US Country Songs (Billboard)	28
