= Ghost in This House =

- Cassette single cover art

Single by Shenandoah

from the album Extra Mile
- B-side: "She's Still Here"
- Released: September 20, 1990
- Genre: Country
- Length: 3:36
- Label: Columbia
- Songwriter: Hugh Prestwood
- Producers: Robert Byrne; Rick Hall

Shenandoah singles chronology
"Next to You, Next to Me" (1990)	"Ghost in This House" (1990)	"I Got You" (1991)

"Ghost in This House" is a song written by Hugh Prestwood, and recorded by American country music group Shenandoah. It was released in September 1990 as the second single from their album Extra Mile. The song reached number 5 on the Billboard Hot Country Singles & Tracks chart in December 1990.

It was covered by Alison Krauss on her 1999 album Forget About It. It was presented at the Grand Ole Opry by Kelsea Ballerini in 2016, and by contestant Lauren Duski on The Voice on May 15, 2017.

== Music video ==
The music video for Shenandoah's rendition of the song was directed by Marcus Penczner and premiered in late 1990. The video shows scenes of a woman wandering all alone in her house, intercut with scenes of Shenandoah's lead singer, Marty Raybon (the only band member to appear in the video), singing in a room with only minimal daylight seeping in. At the end of the video, the woman leaves her house.

== Chart performance ==
Chart (1990)	Peak position
Canada Country Singles (RPM)	2
US Hot Country Songs (Billboard)	5

=== Year-end charts ===
Chart (1990)	Position
Canada Country Tracks (RPM)	62

Chart (1991)	Position
US Country Songs (Billboard)	70
