= If Bubba Can Dance (I Can Too) =

Single by Shenandoah

from the album Under the Kudzu
- B-side: "If It Takes Every Rib I've Got"
- Released: February 7, 1994
- Recorded: 1993
- Genre: Country
- Length: 2:47
- Label: RCA Nashville
- Songwriters: Marty Raybon, Mike McGuire, Bob McDill
- Producer: Don Cook

Shenandoah singles chronology
"I Want to Be Loved Like That" (1993)	"If Bubba Can Dance (I Can Too)" (1994)	"I'll Go Down Loving You" (1994)

"If Bubba Can Dance (I Can Too)" is a song recorded by American country music group Shenandoah. It was written by Shenandoah drummer, Mike McGuire and lead singer Marty Raybon along with veteran Nashville writer Bob McDill. It was released in February 1994 as the third single from their album Under the Kudzu. It was a Number One hit in both the United States and Canada.

== Music video ==
The music video was directed by Roger Pistole, and premiered in early 1994.

== Chart performance ==
"If Bubba Can Dance (I Can Too)" debuted at number 74 on the U.S. Billboard Hot Country Singles & Tracks for the week of February 12, 1994.

Chart (1994)	Peak position
Canada Country Singles (RPM)	1
US Hot Country Songs (Billboard)	1

=== Year-end charts ===
Chart (1994)	Position
Canada Country Tracks (RPM)	14
US Country Songs (Billboard)	35
