= Janie Baker's Love Slave =

Single by Shenandoah

from the album Under the Kudzu
- B-side: "Right Where I Belong"
- Released: May 24, 1993
- Genre: Country
- Length: 3:13
- Label: RCA Nashville
- Songwriter: Dennis Linde
- Producer: Don Cook

Shenandoah singles chronology
"Leavin's Been a Long Time Comin'" (1992)	"Janie Baker's Love Slave" (1993)	"I Want to Be Loved Like That" (1993)

"Janie Baker's Love Slave" is a song written by Dennis Linde, and recorded by American country music band Shenandoah. It was released in May 1993 as the lead single from their album Under the Kudzu. The song reached a peak of number 15 on the U.S. Billboard Hot Country Singles & Tracks.

== Content ==
The song is an uptempo, in which the narrator states that he will do anything for a girl named Janie and cannot help himself.

== Music video ==
The music video was directed by Roger Pistole and premiered in mid-1993.

== Chart performance ==
"Janie Baker's Love Slave" debuted at number 70 on the U.S. Billboard Hot Country Singles & Tracks for the week of June 5, 1993.

Chart (1993)	Peak position
Canada Country Singles (RPM)	7
US Hot Country Songs (Billboard)	15

=== Year-end charts ===
Chart (1993)	Position
Canada Country Tracks (RPM)	93
