= The Church on Cumberland Road =

Single by Shenandoah

from the album The Road Not Taken
- B-side: "She Doesn't Cry Anymore"
- Released: January 1989
- Recorded: 1988
- Genre: Country
- Length: 2:58
- Label: Columbia
- Songwriters: Bob DiPiero; John Scott Sherrill; Dennis Robbins
- Producers: Rick Hall; Robert Byrne

Shenandoah singles chronology
"Mama Knows" (1988)	"The Church on Cumberland Road" (1989)	"Sunday in the South" (1989)

"The Church on Cumberland Road" is a song written by Bob DiPiero, John Scott Sherrill and Dennis Robbins, and recorded by American country music group Shenandoah. It was released in January 1989 as the second single from their album The Road Not Taken. It was their first number-one hit in both the United States and Canada. Robbins himself originally recorded the song and it served as the B-side to his 1987 MCA single "Two Of A Kind (Workin’ On A Full House)" which would later become a No. 1 country hit for Garth Brooks in 1991.

== Music video ==
The music video was directed by Larry Boothby. It was the band's first music video, which according to drummer Mike McGuire, helped create more recognition for the band and its members.

== Cover versions ==
In 2001, on a live CMT special, Rascal Flatts covered the song. It is also the first song the members of Rascal Flatts performed live together before officially forming in 1999.

== Nickelback Version ==
In 2025, Shenandoah partnered with Nickelback on a new version of the song. The idea for the collaboration came about when respective lead vocalists Marty Raybon and Chad Kroeger struck up a friendship at several music festivals. The song was released on November 7, 2025, with an accompanying animated music video.

== Chart performance ==
Chart (1989)	Peak position
Canada Country Singles (RPM)	1
US Hot Country Songs (Billboard)	1

=== Year-end charts ===
Chart (1989)	Position
Canada Country Tracks (RPM)	30
US Country Songs (Billboard)	29
