= Somewhere in the Vicinity of the Heart =

Single by Shenandoah with Alison Krauss

from the album In the Vicinity of the Heart
- B-side: "Darned If I Don't (Danged If I Do)"
- Released: November 21, 1994
- Genre: Country
- Length: 4:05
- Label: Liberty
- Songwriters: Bill LaBounty, Rick Chudacoff
- Producer: Don Cook

Shenandoah singles chronology
"I'll Go Down Loving You" (1994)	"Somewhere in the Vicinity of the Heart" (1994)	"Darned If I Don't (Danged If I Do)" (1995)

"Somewhere in the Vicinity of the Heart" is a song written by Bill LaBounty and Rick Chudacoff, and recorded by American country music band Shenandoah with a guest vocal from bluegrass singer Alison Krauss. It was released in November 1994 as the first single from Shenandoah's album In the Vicinity of the Heart, its only release for Liberty Records. The song was a Top Ten country hit in 1995, winning a Grammy Award and a Country Music Association award for both acts.

== History ==
In August 1994, Shenandoah left its previous label, RCA Records for Liberty Records, which at the time was the Nashville division of Capitol Records. RCA gave Liberty the master recordings of an album that the band was in the process of recording at the time, and the label added "Somewhere in the Vicinity of the Heart" to make the album meet its preferred album format. That album was released in November 1994 as In the Vicinity of the Heart, with the title track as the first single release from it. The track's B-side, "Darned If I Don't (Danged If I Do)," was later released in early 1995 as the second single from the album.

== Critical reception ==
Jim Ridley of New Country magazine cited "Somewhere in the Vicinity of the Heart" as a standout on the album, describing Krauss' vocal as "cut[ting] through the slick arrangement like sunlight through fog." David Zimmerman of USA Today wrote that the song "catapaulted [Krauss] onto country radio," and Associated Press writer Jim Patterson said that the song's success helped to boost sales of her independent album Now That I've Found You.

The song won Shenandoah and Krauss two awards in 1995: the Country Music Association's Vocal Event of the Year and the Grammy Award for Best Country Collaboration with Vocals. B-side "Darned If I Don't" received a nomination for Best Country Performance by a Duo or Group with Vocal at the Grammy Awards that same year.

== Chart performance ==
"Somewhere in the Vicinity of the Heart" spent 20 weeks on the Billboard Hot Country Singles & Tracks (now Hot Country Songs) charts, debuting on the chart week of December 3, 1994 and peaking at number 7 in early 1995. It reached the same peak on the Canadian RPM Country Tracks charts.

Chart (1994–1995)	Peak position
Canada Country Singles (RPM)	7
US Hot Country Songs (Billboard)	7

=== Year-end charts ===
Chart (1995)	Position
Canada Country Tracks (RPM)	56
