= Heaven Bound (I'm Ready) =

- Cassette single cover art

Single by Shenandoah

from the album In the Vicinity of the Heart
- B-side: "Cabin Fever"
- Released: August 5, 1995
- Genre: Country
- Length: 3:09
- Label: Liberty
- Songwriter: Dennis Linde
- Producer: Don Cook

Shenandoah singles chronology
"Darned If I Don't (Danged If I Do)" (1995)	"Heaven Bound (I'm Ready)" (1995)	"Always Have, Always Will" (1996)

"Heaven Bound (I'm Ready)" is a song written by Dennis Linde and originally recorded by the American country music group The Oak Ridge Boys on their 1991 album Unstoppable. It was released in August 1995 by American country music group Shenandoah as the third single from the album In the Vicinity of the Heart. Their version of the song reached No. 24 on the Billboard Hot Country Singles & Tracks chart.

== Content ==
The song is an up-tempo in which the narrator is excited about returning home from work to see his lover.

== Critical reception ==
Jim Ridley of New Country described the song negatively, saying that it sounded similar to "The Lion Sleeps Tonight". An uncredited review in the Indianapolis Star was more favorable, calling the song "a clever merger of spiritual and country".

== Chart performance ==
Chart (1995)	Peak position
Canada Country Singles (RPM)	20
US Hot Country Songs (Billboard)	24
