= Sunday in the South =

Single by Shenandoah

from the album The Road Not Taken
- B-side: "Changes"
- Released: May 1989
- Recorded: 1988
- Genre: Country
- Length: 4:11
- Label: Columbia
- Songwriter: Jay Booker
- Producers: Robert Byrne; Rick Hall

Shenandoah singles chronology
"The Church on Cumberland Road" (1989)	"Sunday in the South" (1989)	"Two Dozen Roses" (1989)

"Sunday in the South" is a song written by Jay Booker, and recorded by American country music group Shenandoah. It was released in May 1989 as the third single from their album The Road Not Taken. It was their second number-one hit in both the United States and Canada.

== Content ==
The song is a recollection of sacred Sundays, namely in the Southern United States.

== Music video ==
The music video was directed by Larry Boothby and premiered in mid-1989. It was shot on the grounds of the Colbert County Courthouse in Tuscumbia, Alabama. The storyline roughly follows those of the lyrics, with the band performing at a community potluck, as the backdrop for children's games, checkers and more.

== Chart performance ==
Chart (1989)	Peak position
Canada Country Singles (RPM)	1
US Hot Country Songs (Billboard)	1

=== Year-end charts ===
Chart (1989)	Position
Canada Country Tracks (RPM)	68
US Country Songs (Billboard)	19

== Other versions ==
Shenandoah remade "Sunday in the South" with Jason Aldean and Luke Bryan. It was released on September 13, 2024.
