= She Doesn't Cry Anymore =

Single by Shenandoah

from the album Shenandoah
- B-side: "What She Wants"
- Released: March 1988
- Genre: Country
- Length: 3:37
- Label: Columbia
- Songwriters: Robert Byrne; Will Robinson
- Producers: Robert Byrne; Rick Hall

Shenandoah singles chronology
| "Stop the Rain" (1987) | "She Doesn't Cry Anymore" (1988) | "Mama Knows" (1988) |

"She Doesn't Cry Anymore" is a song written by Robert Byrne and Will Robinson, and recorded by American country music group Shenandoah. It was released in March 1988 as the third and final single from their debut album Shenandoah. The song reached number 9 on the Billboard Hot Country Singles & Tracks chart in July 1988. It also peaked at number 36 on the Canadian RPM Country Tracks chart.

== Charts ==
=== Weekly charts ===
| Chart (1988) | Peak position |
|---|---|
| US Hot Country Songs (Billboard) | 9 |
| Canadian RPM Country Tracks | 36 |

=== Year-end charts ===
| Chart (1988) | Position |
|---|---|
| US Hot Country Songs (Billboard) | 64 |
