= Mama Knows =

Single by Shenandoah

from the album The Road Not Taken
- B-side: "The Show Must Go On"
- Released: August 1988
- Genre: Country
- Length: 3:22
- Label: Columbia
- Songwriters: Tony Haselden; Tim Mensy
- Producers: Robert Byrne; Rick Hall

Shenandoah singles chronology
| "She Doesn't Cry Anymore" (1988) | "Mama Knows" (1988) | "The Church on Cumberland Road" (1989) |

"Mama Knows" is a song written by Tony Haselden and Tim Mensy, and recorded by American country music group Shenandoah. It was released in August 1988 as the first single from their album The Road Not Taken. The song reached number 5 on the Billboard Hot Country Singles & Tracks chart in December 1988.

== Chart performance ==
| Chart (1988) | Peak position |
|---|---|
| US Hot Country Songs (Billboard) | 5 |
| Canadian RPM Country Tracks | 4 |
