= WERH (AM) =

- Hamilton, Alabama; United States
- Frequency: 970 kHz

Programming
- Format: Defunct

Ownership
- Owner: Kate F. Fite
- Sister stations: WERH-FM

History
- First air date: 1950
- Call sign meaning: "William Earnest Rankin Hugh" "Where Entertainment Rates High"

Technical information
- Facility ID: 33472
- Class: D
- Power: 5,000 watts (day only)
- Transmitter coordinates: 34°07′01″N 87°59′29″W

WERH (970 AM) was a radio station licensed to serve Hamilton, Alabama. The station was owned by Kate F. Fite. It aired a Southern Gospel music format on partial weekday mornings and all-day Sunday while playing a country music format on weekday mornings and afternoons.

WERH was established in 1950. Although Kate F. Fite was still listed as the station's licensee in the Federal Communications Commission (FCC) database, she died on June 15, 2001, and the station's December 2003 license renewal application lists the licensee as "Kate F. Fite (deceased), Martha H. Fowler, & Megan Summerford."

The station was assigned the WERH call letters by the FCC.

WERH's license was cancelled by the FCC on February 12, 2015, due to the station having been silent for more than twelve months (since November 8, 2012).
