= I Got You (Shenandoah song) =

Single by Shenandoah

from the album Extra Mile
- B-side: "The Road Not Taken"
- Released: January 1991
- Genre: Country
- Length: 3:45
- Label: Columbia
- Songwriters: Robert Byrne; Teddy Gentry; Greg Fowler
- Producers: Robert Byrne; Rick Hall

Shenandoah singles chronology
"Ghost in This House" (1990)	"I Got You" (1991)	"The Moon Over Georgia" (1991)

"I Got You" is a song written by Teddy Gentry, Robert Byrne and Greg Fowler, and recorded by American country music group Shenandoah. It was released in January 1991 as the third single from their album Extra Mile. The song reached number 7 on the Billboard Hot Country Singles & Tracks chart in March 1991. It also peaked at number 4 on the Canadian RPM Country Tracks chart.

== Chart performance ==
Chart (1991)	Peak position
Canada Country Singles (RPM)	4
US Hot Country Songs (Billboard)	7

=== Year-end charts ===
Chart (1991)	Position
Canada Country Tracks (RPM)	59
US Country Songs (Billboard)	52
