= I Want to Be Loved Like That =

Single by Shenandoah

from the album Under the Kudzu
- B-side: "Just Say the Word"
- Released: September 27, 1993
- Genre: Country
- Length: 3:43
- Label: RCA Nashville
- Songwriters: Phil Barnhart, Sam Hogin, Bill LaBounty
- Producer: Don Cook

Shenandoah singles chronology
"Janie Baker's Love Slave" (1993)	"I Want to Be Loved Like That" (1993)	"If Bubba Can Dance (I Can Too)" (1994)

"I Want to Be Loved Like That" is a song written by Phil Barnhart, Sam Hogin and Bill LaBounty, and recorded by American country music band Shenandoah. It was released in September 1993 as the second single from the album Under the Kudzu. The song spent 20 weeks on the Hot Country Songs charts, reaching a peak of number 3. It also went to number 2 on Gavin Report and number 1 on Radio & Records. The song also peaked at number 4 on the RPM Country Tracks charts dated January 24, 1994.

== Content ==
In this ballad, the narrator gives examples of relationships like Natalie Wood and James Dean, and his mother and father, then states he wants to be loved with the same affection they had for each other.

== Chart performance ==
"I Want to Be Loved Like That" debuted on the U.S. Billboard Hot Country Singles & Tracks for the week of October 9, 1993.

Chart (1993–1994)	Peak position
Canada Country Singles (RPM)	4
US Hot Country Songs (Billboard)	3

=== Year-end charts ===
Chart (1994)	Position
Canada Country Tracks (RPM)	82
