= Shenandoah (band) =

American country music group

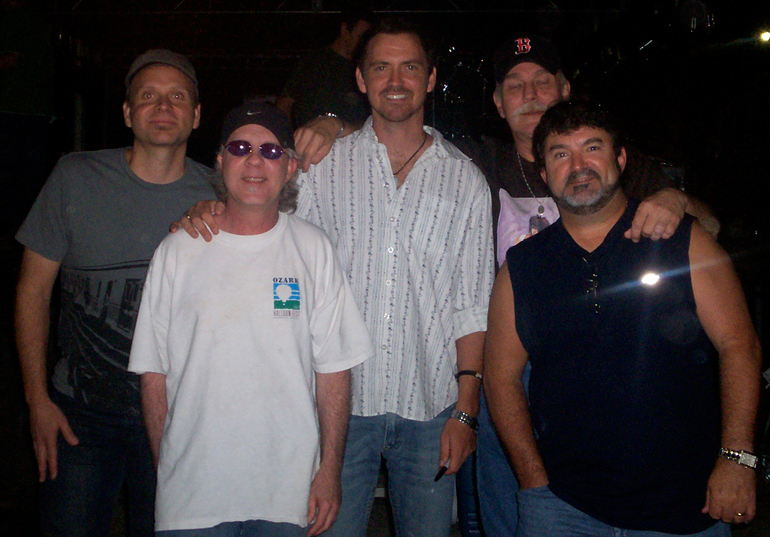
- Shenandoah in July 2008. L-R: Mike Folsom, Stan Munsey, Jimmy Yeary, Jim Seales, Mike McGuire.

Background information
- Origin: Muscle Shoals, Alabama, U.S.
- Genre: Country
- Years active: 1984–1997, 2000–present
- Labels: Columbia/CBS, RCA, Liberty, Capitol, Free Falls, Cumberland Road Records, Foundry Records
- Spinoffs: Raybon Brothers
- Members: Marty Raybon; Mike McGuire; Paul Sanders; Nicky Hines; Donnie Allen; Andrew Ishee
- Past members: See Band members
- Website: www.shenandoahband.com

Shenandoah is an American country music band founded in Muscle Shoals, Alabama, in 1984 by Marty Raybon (lead vocals, acoustic guitar), Ralph Ezell (bass guitar, backing vocals), Stan Thorn (keyboards, backing vocals), Jim Seales (lead guitar, backing vocals), and Mike McGuire (drums, background vocals). Thorn and Ezell left the band in the mid-1990s, with Rocky Thacker taking over on bass guitar; Keyboardist Stan Munsey joined the line up in 1995, until his departure in 2018. The band split up in 1997 after Raybon left. Seales and McGuire reformed the band in 2000 with lead singer Brent Lamb, who was in turn replaced by Curtis Wright and then by Jimmy Yeary. Ezell rejoined in the early 2000s, and after his 2007 death, he was replaced by Mike Folsom. Raybon returned to the band in 2014. That same year, Jamie Michael replaced the retiring Jim Seales on lead guitar.

Shenandoah has released nine studio albums, of which two have been certified gold by the Recording Industry Association of America. The band has also charted twenty-six singles on the Billboard Hot Country Songs charts, including the Number One hits "The Church on Cumberland Road," "Sunday in the South" and "Two Dozen Roses" from 1989, "Next to You, Next to Me" from 1990, and "If Bubba Can Dance (I Can Too)" from 1994. The late 1994-early 1995 single "Somewhere in the Vicinity of the Heart," which featured guest vocals from Alison Krauss, won both artists a Grammy Award for Best Country Collaboration with Vocals.

== History ==
The original lineup as depicted in Modern Screen's Country Music magazine, August 1994. Top, L-R: Stan Thorn, Marty Raybon, Jim Seales. Bottom: Mike McGuire (left) and Ralph Ezell.

Lead guitarist Jim Seales and drummer Mike McGuire formed Shenandoah in 1984 as a house band in Muscle Shoals, Alabama, with bass guitarist Ralph Ezell and keyboardist Stan Thorn, as well as lead singer Marty Raybon, who had been in his father's bluegrass band since childhood called American Bluegrass Express, as well as Heartbreak Mountain. Before that, Seales, Thorn, McGuire and Ezell were session musicians. McGuire invited songwriting friend Robert Byrne to one of the session band's shows. Byrne then invited them into his recording studio to record a demo, which he then pitched to Columbia Records' CBS Records division. The band first wanted to assume the name The MGM Band, a name which was rejected for legal reasons. CBS suggested Rhythm Rangers and Shenandoah as possible names, and Raybon chose the latter because he thought that the name Rhythm Rangers "sounded like an amateur band."

=== 1987–1990: Shenandoah and The Road Not Taken ===
In 1987, Shenandoah released its self-titled debut studio album, which Byrne and Rick Hall produced. This album accounted for the band's first two charting singles in "They Don't Make Love Like We Used To" and "Stop the Rain". The latter was the band's first Top 40 country hit, peaking at number 28 on the Billboard Hot Country Singles (now Hot Country Songs) charts. John Bush of Allmusic wrote that this album "leaned a little close to the pop-schmaltz they later rebelled against."

The Road Not Taken was the band's second album, released in 1988. This album's first two singles — "She Doesn't Cry Anymore", previously found on Shenandoah, and "Mama Knows" — brought the band to the Top Ten for the first time. After these singles came three consecutive Billboard number-one hits: "The Church on Cumberland Road", "Sunday in the South" and "Two Dozen Roses". "The Church on Cumberland Road," with its two-week run at Number One, marked the first time in country music history that a country music band's first number-one single spent more than one week at the top. This song was originally recorded by one of its three writers, former Rockets and Billy Hill member Dennis Robbins as the B-side to his 1987 single "Two of a Kind, Workin' on a Full House"; Garth Brooks would later reach number one in 1991 with a rendition of the latter song. Byrne co-wrote "Two Dozen Roses" with Mac McAnally, a veteran songwriter and session musician who has recorded both as a solo singer and as a member of Jimmy Buffett's Coral Reefer Band. The last single from The Road Not Taken, "See If I Care", reached number 6 on Billboard and number one on Gavin Report. On January 22, 1991, The Road Not Taken earned a gold certification from the Recording Industry Association of America (RIAA) for shipments of 500,000 copies in the United States. Tom Roland of Allmusic gave The Road Not Taken four-and-a-half stars out of five, with his review saying, "The songs mix the day-to-day struggles of everyday-Joe with a steady respect for love, personal roots, and family." In the wake of The Road Not Taken's success, the band played 300 shows in 1989.

=== 1990–1992: Extra Mile and lawsuits ===
The band achieved its biggest hit in 1990 with the three-week number-one single "Next to You, Next to Me." Written by then-solo singers Robert Ellis Orrall and Curtis Wright, this was the first of five singles from Shenandoah's third album, Extra Mile. "Ghost in This House," "I Got You" (co-written by Teddy Gentry of the band Alabama) and "The Moon Over Georgia" all peaked in the Billboard top ten between late 1990 and mid-1991, with the latter two reaching number one on Gavin Report; "When You Were Mine," the fifth single, stopped at number 38 on Billboard in 1991. Also that year, the band won the Academy of Country Music's Vocal Group of the Year award.

Alanna Nash of Entertainment Weekly gave Extra Mile a B rating, saying that it was "unflinchingly commercial" but adding that "the band goes beyond Alabama's jingoistic flag-waving and Restless Heart's vapid mood-brighteners to showcase intelligent ballads and jaunty rhythm numbers." An uncredited review in the Pittsburgh Post-Gazette said that the band "proved that no matter how overcrowded the field is, there's always room for quality." Extra Mile earned a gold certification in the United States.

Following the release of Extra Mile, a band from Kentucky threatened to sue Shenandoah over the use of the name Shenandoah. After a financial settlement was made with the Kentucky band, two other bands filed lawsuits over Shenandoah's name. The lawsuits depleted the money earned by the band on the road, which led to the band asking the label and their production company to all pay one-third of their legal costs. The production company refused, and Shenandoah was forced to file for Chapter 11 bankruptcy in early 1991 after paying more than 2 million dollars on court settlements and legal fees. Although the lawsuits allowed Shenandoah to keep its name, the bankruptcy filing terminated the contract with Columbia after a 1992 Greatest Hits package. The production company's officials then filed a lawsuit against the band, claiming that it had tried to void its agreement with them. After Shenandoah's departure, there were no other bands on Columbia's Nashville division; as a result, producer Larry Strickland assembled three musicians to create a new band called Matthews, Wright & King in an attempt to keep a commercially successful band on the label.

=== 1992–1994: Long Time Comin' and Under the Kudzu ===
In 1992, the band had moved to RCA Records Nashville, releasing Long Time Comin' on it that year. This album was produced by Byrne and Keith Stegall, a former solo singer best known for producing Alan Jackson's albums. "Rock My Baby" (another Curtis Wright co-write) led off the single releases, reaching number 2 on Billboard and Radio & Records and number 1 on Gavin Report. After it came the top 30 hits "Hey Mister (I Need This Job)" and "Leavin's Been a Long Time Comin'", whose music video featured a guest appearance by Dallas Cowboy quarterback and NFL hall of famer Troy Aikman as ‘Cowboy Joe’. Also guest appearing was Eddy Arnold. The band was nominated as Vocal Group of the Year at the Academy of Country Music again in 1992. Long Time Comin' received a three-and-a-half star rating from the Chicago Tribune, whose Jack Hurst said that it was "an excellent brand of rural-toned blue-collar music." Nash gave a B− rating in Entertainment Weekly, where she said that the album had a more country pop-oriented sound than its predecessors, but commended the "sincerity" of Raybon's voice and the themes of "family and friendship."

Under the Kudzu, Shenandoah's second RCA album, followed in 1993. It was produced by Don Cook, who was also Brooks & Dunn's producer at the time. "Janie Baker's Love Slave", written by "Burning Love" writer Dennis Linde, was a top 15 Billboard hit from the album early that year. Next came "I Want to Be Loved Like That", which peaked at number three on Billboard, number two on Gavin Report and number one on Radio & Records. The album also included the band's fifth and final Billboard number-one hit, "If Bubba Can Dance (I Can Too)", which Raybon and McGuire wrote with veteran Nashville songwriter Bob McDill after a conversation about line dancing instructions at the local bar Shenandoah started in. "I'll Go Down Loving You," the last single from the album, spent eleven weeks on the Billboard charts and peaked at number 46, thus becoming the band's first single to miss the Top 40 since "They Don't Make Love Like We Used To" in 1987. Michael Corcoran of The Dallas Morning News called Under the Kudzu "their strongest album to date", and Jack Hurst gave it three stars, saying, "Shenandoah carries most of this album with impassioned vocals rather than superior song content."

=== 1994–1995: In the Vicinity of the Heart and collaborations ===
Columbia's parent company Sony Music Entertainment released ten of the band's Columbia songs in a Super Hits compilation in May 1994, which was certified gold in 2002. Shenandoah also collaborated with country and bluegrass singer Ricky Skaggs on the 1994 Keith Whitley tribute Keith Whitley: A Tribute Album, recording a cover version of Whitley's "All I Ever Loved Was You". Later in 1994, the band left RCA for Liberty Records, then the name for the Nashville division of Capitol Records. RCA gave Liberty the master recordings for a nearly-completed album, to which Liberty added "Somewhere in the Vicinity of the Heart", a song featuring guest vocals from bluegrass musician Alison Krauss. Liberty released the album in November 1994 as In the Vicinity of the Heart, with the number seven-peaking title track also serving as the first single release. This song was also Krauss' first top 40 country hit, and its success helped boost sales of her album Now That I've Found You: A Collection.

Vicinity became the band's fastest-selling album, and the first 175,000 copies were distributed with prepaid telephone cards which included an 800 number that could be called to receive a greeting from the band members. The album also produced the band's last Top Ten hit in "Darned If I Don't (Danged If I Do)." Originally the B-side to "Somewhere in the Vicinity of the Heart," this song was co-written by Ronnie Dunn (of Brooks & Dunn) and songwriter Dean Dillon, best known for co-writing several of George Strait's singles. "Heaven Bound (I'm Ready)" (another Dennis Linde song) and "Always Have, Always Will," peaking at numbers 24 and 40, were the last two releases from the album. Jim Ridley gave the album a two-and-a-half star rating in New Country magazine, citing the vocal performances on the title track and "I Wouldn't Know" as standouts, but saying that the rest of the album did not take any risks.

Raybon released a solo gospel music album for Sparrow Records in July 1995, and in October of the same year, that label released a multi-artist country-gospel album entitled Amazing Grace — A Country Salute to Gospel, to which the band contributed a rendition of "Beulah Land." Shenandoah also covered The Beatles' "Can't Buy Me Love" on the mid-1995 album Come Together: America Salutes The Beatles. "Somewhere in the Vicinity of the Heart" won Shenandoah and Krauss won the 1995 Grammy Award for Best Country Vocal Collaboration and the Country Music Association award for Vocal Event, and "Darned If I Don't" was nominated for Grammy Award for Best Country Vocal by a Duo or Group the same year.

=== 1995–1996: Now and Then and Shenandoah Christmas ===
Stan Thorn and Ralph Ezell left in late 1995 and early 1996, respectively, with Rocky Thacker unofficially replacing Ezell, and songwriter/keyboardist Stan Munsey replacing Thorn. During this time, Liberty Records was renamed Capitol Records Nashville. The band's first album for Capitol, 1996's Now and Then, comprised re-recordings of eight Columbia singles, the original recording of "Somewhere in the Vicinity of the Heart", and five new songs. Among these new songs was the album's only single, "All Over but the Shoutin'," which peaked at number 43 on Billboard.

Nash gave this album an A− rating in Entertainment Weekly, saying that Raybon's voice "beautifully capture[s] the rites of passage in Small Town, USA." Larry Stephens of Country Standard Time also reviewed the album favorably, saying, "The familiar hits on this album have all been re-recorded, but they've lost none of their familiar and loved sound," while Allmusic critic William Ruhlmann gave it two stars out of five and referred to it as a "stopgap."

Shenandoah's first Christmas music album, Shenandoah Christmas, was released in September 1996, also on Capitol. Except for the original song "There's a Way in the Manger," it comprised acoustic renditions of popular Christmas songs. It received a two-and-a-half star rating from Allmusic, whose critic Thom Owens said that none of the renditions were "particularly noteworthy."

=== 1997: Departure of Marty Raybon and disbanding of Shenandoah ===
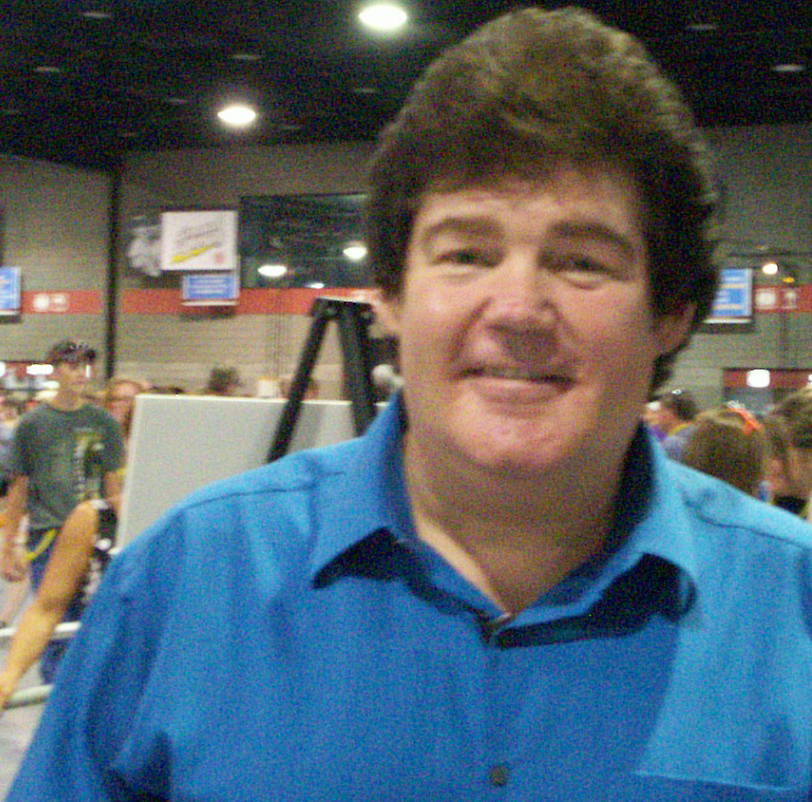
Marty Raybon at CMA Music Festival, June 2010.

Marty Raybon and his brother Tim recorded one album as the Raybon Brothers for MCA Nashville Records in mid-1997. They charted within the top 40 on both the country and Billboard Hot 100 charts with a rendition of the Bob Carlisle song "Butterfly Kisses," followed by the number 64 country release "The Way She's Lookin'." Marty continued to tour with Shenandoah until the end of the year, when the remaining members disbanded and he sold the naming rights. In 2000, he released a second solo album and charted his only solo country chart hit, the number 63 "Cracker Jack Diamond." Raybon remained a solo artist, while Thorn self-released a solo jazz album titled In a Curious Way in 2001.

=== 2000–present: Reunion and Shenandoah 2000 ===
Seales, McGuire, Munsey and Thacker reunited as Shenandoah in 2000, with two new members: lead singer Brent Lamb, and guitarist/vocalist Curtis Wright, who was also playing with Pure Prairie League at the time. Before joining Shenandoah, Wright had been a member of the Super Grit Cowboy Band in the 1980s, then a solo artist and one-half of the duo Orrall & Wright with Robert Ellis Orrall. Wright also wrote "Next to You, Next to Me" and "Rock My Baby", collaborating with Orrall on the former. In 2000, the new lineup recorded the band's next album, Shenandoah 2000, under the Free Falls label. It produced the band's last chart single in the number 65 "What Children Believe." Jolene Downs of About.com gave this album a positive review, saying that it was a "very strong country album" and "a slightly different sound from the original group, but not bad at all." The band toured small venues in 2001 to promote it.

Lamb left in 2002, with Wright succeeding him on lead vocals and original bassist Ralph Ezell later re-joining. In 2006, Shenandoah released the album Journeys on the Cumberland Road label. Ezell died of a heart attack on November 30, 2007, and Mike Folsom succeeded him on bass guitar. Also, Wright, after also finishing his stint in Pure Prairie League left the group to join Reba McEntire's band in early 2007, and songwriter Jimmy Yeary took over as lead singer. In April 2009, the lineup of Yeary, Folsom, McGuire, Munsey and Seales performed a benefit concert in Muscle Shoals, in which Wright and Raybon also participated.

Yeary and McGuire co-wrote a song entitled "You Never Know" as a tribute to Ezell. Darryl Worley recorded this song on his 2009 album Sounds Like Life, saying that he considered it "dead-on" for him. Shenandoah has continued to tour in 2009 and 2010 with Yeary on lead vocals, mostly playing at community festivals and county fairs. Yeary engaged country-gospel singer Sonya Isaacs (of The Isaacs) in November 2009. They have since become married and had one son in 2011. He has also written songs for other artists, including "In Another World" by Joe Diffie, "Why Wait" by Rascal Flatts, "Summer Thing" by Troy Olsen, "I'm Gonna Love You Through It" by Martina McBride, and "I Drive Your Truck" by Lee Brice. Yeary left in 2011, with Doug Stokes taking over on lead vocals, and Chris Lucas (Roach) on bass.

In August 2014, Marty Raybon re-joined as lead singer of the band, replacing Doug Stokes. At the time of his rejoining, the band consists of Raybon, McGuire, Munsey, and bassist Chris Lucas, later replaced by Paul Sanders. In October, Jamie Michael replaced the retiring Jim Seales on lead guitar, leaving Raybon and McGuire as the two remaining original members. In 2016, Brad Benge joined the group on bass and baritone vocals, until his departure in 2018.

In February 2016, Shenandoah signed with Johnstone Entertainment for management representation. "The confidence that you place in a person should be based on the true understanding you have of their integrity, wisdom and vision. We feel we made the right decision with Cole Johnstone as our manager as we set our sights on the future." said lead vocalist Marty Raybon

The band released a collaborative album in 2020 titled Every Road, which featured vocal collaborations with country music artists such as Brad Paisley and Luke Bryan. "Then a Girl Walks In", a duet with Blake Shelton, served as the lead single. This was followed in 2023 by the band announcing they would begin a 50-show Revival Tour in early 2023. Coinciding with this tour was a single titled "Revival", which was co-written by both members of Florida Georgia Line.

In September 2023, Shenandoah recorded a new version of "Two Dozen Roses" with Luke Combs. Released via 8 Track Entertainment, the track was recorded at the historic FAME Studios in Muscle Shoals, Alabama and was produced by Noah Gordon. Billboard premiered the track on September 21, 2023. The song will be included on a studio album titled If That Ain't Country, slated for release in February 2027. Other tracks on the album include re-recordings of "The Church on Cumberland Road" with Nickelback and "Sunday in the South" with Jason Aldean and Luke Bryan.

== Musical styles ==
The band's sound is defined by country, bluegrass and gospel influences. John Bush of Allmusic calls Shenandoah "one of the first groups to rebel against the urban cowboy image of the '80s and lead the way to the new traditionalism of the '90s." Marty Raybon's vocals have been described as "blend[ing] the soulfulness of rhythm and blues with the lonely intensity of great country music." Alanna Nash wrote that the band's work relies on "sentimental lyrics revolving around the Southern experience," and said that Shenandoah "forged its very commercial reputation on a soulful gospel-and-bluegrass blend, with lead singer Marty Raybon's searing sincerity making even the tritest songs about small-town Southern values and attitudes memorable." Logan Smith of the St. Petersburg Times said that the band has "woven together a highly polished sound built around precision musicianship and pristine harmonies, very much a hybrid of Raybon's bluegrass roots." Writing for the Associated Press, Joe Edwards cited the variety of sounds on the band's second album, referring to "The Church on Cumberland Road" as a "spirited up-tempo," also making note of the Southern imagery in "Sunday in the South" and the "truest country music tradition" of the ballad "She Doesn't Cry Anymore."

== Band members ==
=== Current ===
- Mike McGuire – drums, backing vocals (1984–1997, 2000–present)
- Marty Raybon – lead vocals, acoustic guitar (1984–1997, 2014–present)
- Donnie Allen – fiddle, acoustic guitar (1990–1997, 2014–present)
- Paul Sanders – bass guitar, backing vocals (2014–2016, 2018–present)
- Austin Brown – electric guitar (2024–present)

=== Former ===
- Ralph Ezell – bass guitar, backing vocals (1984–1996, 2002–2007; died 2007)
- Jim Seales – electric guitar, backing vocals (1984–1997, 2000–2014)
- Stan Thorn – keyboards, backing vocals (1984–1995)
- Rocky Thacker – bass guitar, backing vocals (1996–1997, 2000–2002)
- Brent Lamb – lead vocals, acoustic guitar (2000–2002)
- Curtis Wright – acoustic guitar (2000–2007), lead vocals (2002–2007), backing vocals (2000–2002)
- Mike Folsom – bass guitar, backing vocals (2007–2011)
- Jimmy Yeary – lead vocals, acoustic guitar (2007–2011)
- Doug Stokes – lead vocals (2011–2014)
- Travis Mobley – keyboards (2018–2022)
- Chris "Roach" Lucas – bass guitar (2011–2014)
- Brad Benge – bass guitar, backing vocals (2016–2018)
- Stan Munsey – keyboards (1995–1997, 2000–2018)
- Jamie Michael – electric guitar, backing vocals (2014–2020)
- Jeff Allen – bass guitar, backing vocals (2010–2011)
- Austin Crum – electric guitar (2020–2022)
- Nicky Hines – electric guitar (2022–2024)
- Andrew Ishee – keyboards (2022–2024)

== Discography ==
=== Studio albums ===
- Shenandoah (1987)
- The Road Not Taken (1989)
- Extra Mile (1990)
- Long Time Comin' (1992)
- Under the Kudzu (1993)
- In the Vicinity of the Heart (1994)
- Shenandoah Christmas (1996)
- Shenandoah 2000 (2000)
- Journeys (2006)
- Good Ole Fashioned Christmas (2014)
- Good News Travels Fast (2016)
- Reloaded (2018)
- Every Road (2020)

=== Billboard number-one hits ===
- "The Church on Cumberland Road" (2 weeks, 1989)
- "Sunday in the South" (1 week, 1989)
- "Two Dozen Roses" (1 week, 1989)
- "Next to You, Next to Me" (3 weeks, 1990)
- "If Bubba Can Dance (I Can Too)" (1 week, 1994)

== Awards and nominations ==
=== Grammy Awards ===
Year	Nominee / work	Award	Result
1991	"Ghost in This House"	Best Country Performance by a Duo or Group with Vocal	Nominated
1996	"Darned If I Don't (Danged If I Do)"	Best Country Performance by a Duo or Group with Vocal	Nominated
1996	"Somewhere in the Vicinity of the Heart"^{[A]}	Best Country Collaboration with Vocals	Won

=== American Music Awards ===
Year	Nominee / work	Award	Result
1991	Shenandoah	Favorite Country Band/Duo/Group	Nominated

=== TNN/Music City News Country Awards ===
Year	Nominee / work	Award	Result
1990	Shenandoah	Vocal Group of the Year	Nominated
1991	Shenandoah	Vocal Group of the Year	Nominated
1993	Shenandoah	Vocal Band of the Year	Nominated
1996	Shenandoah and Alison Krauss	Vocal Collaboration of the Year	Nominated

=== Academy of Country Music Awards ===
Year	Nominee / work	Award	Result
1990	Shenandoah	Top New Vocal Group or Duet	Nominated
1990	Shenandoah	Top Vocal Group of the Year	Nominated
1991	Shenandoah	Top Vocal Group of the Year	Won
1991	"Next to You, Next to Me"	Single Record of the Year	Nominated
1992	Shenandoah	Top Vocal Group of the Year	Nominated

=== Country Music Association Awards ===
Year	Nominee / work	Award	Result
1989	Shenandoah	Horizon Award	Nominated
1989	Shenandoah	Vocal Group of the Year	Nominated
1990	Shenandoah	Vocal Group of the Year	Nominated
1991	Shenandoah	Vocal Group of the Year	Nominated
1992	Shenandoah	Vocal Group of the Year	Nominated
1995	Shenandoah	Vocal Group of the Year	Nominated
1995	"Somewhere in the Vicinity of the Heart"^{[A]}	Vocal Event of the Year	Won

^[A]Nominated alongside Alison Krauss
