= The Moon Over Georgia =

Single by Shenandoah

from the album Extra Mile
- B-side: "Can't Stop Now"
- Released: April 1991
- Genre: Country
- Length: 3:13
- Label: Columbia
- Songwriter: Mark Narmore
- Producers: Robert Byrne; Rick Hall

Shenandoah singles chronology
"I Got You" (1991)	"The Moon Over Georgia" (1991)	"When You Were Mine" (1991)

"The Moon Over Georgia" is a song written by Mark Narmore and recorded by American country music group Shenandoah. It was released in April 1991 as the fourth single from their album Extra Mile. The song reached number 9 on the Billboard Hot Country Singles & Tracks chart in July 1991. It was previously recorded by Larry Boone for his 1990 album, Down That River Road.

== Chart performance ==
Chart (1991)	Peak position
Canada Country Singles (RPM)	11
US Hot Country Songs (Billboard)	9

=== Year-end charts ===
Chart (1991)	Position
US Country Songs (Billboard)	72
