= Two Dozen Roses =

Single by Shenandoah

from the album The Road Not Taken
- B-side: "Hard Country"
- Released: August 1989
- Recorded: 1988
- Genre: Country
- Length: 3:42
- Label: Columbia Nashville
- Songwriters: Robert Byrne, Mac McAnally
- Producers: Rick Hall, Robert Byrne

Shenandoah singles chronology
"Sunday in the South" (1989)	"Two Dozen Roses" (1989)	"See If I Care" (1990)

"Two Dozen Roses" is a song written by Mac McAnally and Robert Byrne, and recorded by American country music group Shenandoah. It was released in August 1989 as the fourth single from their album The Road Not Taken. It was their third number-one hit in both the United States and Canada.

The band released a new version of the song featuring Luke Combs in September 2023.

== Content ==
The song's narrator offers hypotheticals to what may have changed his lover's mind about leaving him, such as "two dozen roses" instead of one dozen or "an older bottle of wine" even going as far as asking "If I really could've hung the moon, would you change your mind?"

== Chart performance ==
Chart (1989–1990)	Peak position
Canada Country Singles (RPM)	1
US Hot Country Songs (Billboard)	1

=== Year-end charts ===
Chart (1989)	Position
Canada Country Tracks (RPM)	56

Chart (1990)	Position
US Country Songs (Billboard)	50

== Certifications ==
Region	Certification	Certified units/sales
United States (RIAA)	2× Platinum	2,000,000^{‡}
^{‡} Sales+streaming figures based on certification alone.
