= Next to You, Next to Me =

- Cassette single cover art

Single by Shenandoah

from the album Extra Mile
- B-side: "Daddy's Little Man"
- Released: June 1990
- Recorded: 1990
- Genre: Country
- Length: 3:38
- Label: Columbia Nashville
- Songwriters: Robert Ellis Orrall; Curtis Wright
- Producers: Robert Byrne; Rick Hall

Shenandoah singles chronology
"See If I Care" (1990)	"Next to You, Next to Me" (1990)	"Ghost in This House" (1990)

"Next to You, Next to Me" is a song written by Robert Ellis Orrall and Curtis Wright, and recorded by American country music group Shenandoah. It was released in June 1990 as the lead-off single from their album Extra Mile. It was a Number One hit in both the United States and Canada. It is also the band's longest-lasting number 1, at three weeks. As of 2006, no other single from Columbia had spent three weeks atop the country charts.

The song received a nomination for Single of the Year by the Academy of Country Music.

== Content ==
The song is an up-tempo, in which the narrator exclaims that he would rather be sitting next to his lover than be anywhere else.

== Other versions ==
It was covered by Rascal Flatts as a bonus track on the deluxe version of their 2012 album Changed.

== Music video ==
The music video was directed by Larry Boothby. It depicts the band singing the song in a basement, and various characters posing in front of a red pickup.

== Chart performance ==
Chart (1990)	Peak position
Canada Country Singles (RPM)	1
US Hot Country Songs (Billboard)	1

=== Year-end charts ===
Chart (1990)	Position
Canada Country Tracks (RPM)	23
US Country Songs (Billboard)	22
