= Robert Byrne (songwriter) =

American songwriter (1954–2005)

- Born: Robert Bellarmine Byrne; July 10, 1954; Detroit, Michigan, U.S.
- Origin: Muscle Shoals, Alabama
- Died: June 27, 2005 (aged 50) Nashville, Tennessee, U.S.
- Genre: Country
- Occupations: Songwriter, record producer
- Years active: 1977-2000

Robert Byrne (July 10, 1954 – June 27, 2005) was an American songwriter known primarily for his work in country music. He did most of his work at FAME Studios in Muscle Shoals, Alabama.

Between the 1980s and 2000s, Byrne co-wrote songs for several artists, including the number one singles "How Do I Turn You On" by Ronnie Milsap; "I Can't Win for Losin' You", "Once in a Blue Moon", "That Was a Close One" and "What I'd Say" for Earl Thomas Conley; "I Didn't Know My Own Strength" by Lorrie Morgan; and "Two Dozen Roses" by Shenandoah. He and Rick Hall also produced for Shenandoah.

Other artists who recorded his songs include Mindy McCready, The Forester Sisters, Phil Vassar, Johnny Lee, Randy Parton and Mike Reid. Byrne was found dead at his Nashville, Tennessee house on June 27, 2005, having died of unknown causes.

== Albums ==
- Blame It on the Night (Mercury, 1979)
- An Eye For An Eye (with Brandon Barnes as Byrne & Barnes) (Climax, 1981)
