= Ricky Van Shelton discography =

American country music artist

- Studio albums: 9
- Compilation albums: 4
- Singles: 28 (27 as a solo artist and 1as a featured artist)
- Music videos: 13
- Christmas albums: 2
- No.1 Single: 13

Ricky Van Shelton is an American country music artist. His discography consists of nine studio albums, two Christmas albums, four compilation albums, and twenty-eight singles. Of his singles, twenty-six have charted on Billboard country singles charts in the U.S., including ten Number Ones.

== Studio albums ==
Title	Album details	Peak chart positions				Certifications (sales threshold)
Title	Album details	US Country	US	CAN Country	CAN	Certifications (sales threshold)
Wild-Eyed Dream	Release date: February 26, 1987; Label: Columbia Nashville; Formats: LP, CD, cassette	1	76	—	—	CAN: Platinum; US: Platinum
Loving Proof	Release date: September 20, 1988; Label: Columbia Nashville; Formats: LP, CD, cassette	1	78	1	—	CAN: Platinum; US: Platinum
RVS III	Release date: January 16, 1990; Label: Columbia Nashville; Formats: LP, CD, cassette	1	53	—	—	CAN: Gold; US: Platinum
Backroads	Release date: May 21, 1991; Label: Columbia Nashville; Formats: CD, cassette	3	23	4	84	CAN: Gold; US: Platinum
Don't Overlook Salvation^{[A]}	Release date: April 28, 1992; Label: Columbia Nashville; Formats: CD, cassette	—	122	—	—	US: Gold
A Bridge I Didn't Burn	Release date: August 24, 1993; Label: Columbia Nashville; Formats: CD, cassette	17	91	—	—	CAN: Gold; US: Gold
Love and Honor	Release date: November 1, 1994; Label: Columbia Nashville; Formats: CD, cassette	62	—	—	—	
Making Plans	Release date: October 27, 1998; Label: Vanguard Records; Formats: CD, cassette	—	—	—	—	
Fried Green Tomatoes	Release date: May 23, 2000; Label: Audium/Koch Records; Formats: CD, cassette	—	—	—	—	
"—" denotes releases that did not chart

== Compilation albums ==
Title	Album details	Peak chart positions		Certifications (sales threshold)
Title	Album details	US Country	US	Certifications (sales threshold)
Greatest Hits Plus	Release date: August 11, 1992; Label: Columbia Nashville; Formats: CD, cassette	9	50	US: Platinum
Super Hits	Release date: May 2, 1995; Label: Columbia Nashville; Formats: CD, cassette	64	—	US: Gold
Super Hits Vol. 2	Release date: August 27, 1996; Label: Sony BMG; Formats: CD, cassette	—	—	
16 Biggest Hits	Release date: February 2, 1999; Label: Columbia Nashville; Formats: CD, cassette	—	—	
"—" denotes releases that did not chart

== Holiday albums ==
Title	Album details	Peak chart positions		Certifications (sales threshold)
Title	Album details	US Country	US Indie	Certifications (sales threshold)
Ricky Van Shelton Sings Christmas	Release date: July 20, 1989; Label: Columbia Records; Formats: LP, CD, cassette	32	—	US: Gold
Blue Christmas	Release date: October 10, 2000; Label: Audium/Koch Records; Formats: CD, cassette	58	46	
"—" denotes releases that did not chart

== Singles ==
Year	Single	Peak chart positions		Album
Year	Single	US Country	CAN Country	Album
1986	"Wild-Eyed Dream"	24	42	Wild-Eyed Dream
1987	"Crime of Passion"	7	5	Wild-Eyed Dream
1987	"Somebody Lied"	1	5	Wild-Eyed Dream
1987	"Life Turned Her That Way"	1	1	Wild-Eyed Dream
1988	"Don't We All Have the Right"	1	1	Wild-Eyed Dream
1988	"I'll Leave This World Loving You"	1	1	Loving Proof
1988	"From a Jack to a King"	1	1	Loving Proof
1989	"Hole in My Pocket"	4	1	Loving Proof
1989	"Living Proof"	1	1	Loving Proof
1989	"Statue of a Fool"	2	1	RVS III
1990	"I've Cried My Last Tear for You"	1	1	RVS III
1990	"I Meant Every Word He Said"	2	1	RVS III
1990	"Life's Little Ups and Downs"	4	9	RVS III
1991	"I Am a Simple Man"	1	1	Backroads
1991	"Keep It Between the Lines"	1	1	Backroads
1991	"After the Lights Go Out"	13	8	Backroads
1992	"Backroads"	2	3	Backroads
1992	"Wear My Ring Around Your Neck"	26	29	Honeymoon in Vegas (soundtrack)
1992	"Wild Man"	5	4	Greatest Hits Plus
1993	"Just as I Am"	26	28	Greatest Hits Plus
1993	"A Couple of Good Years Left"	44	35	A Bridge I Didn't Burn
1994	"Where Was I"	20	9	A Bridge I Didn't Burn
1994	"Wherever She Is"	49	36	Love and Honor
1995	"Lola's Love"	62	65	Love and Honor
1999	"The Best Is Yet to Come"	—	88	Making Plans
2000	"The Decision"	71	—	Fried Green Tomatoes
2000	"Call Me Crazy"	—	—	Fried Green Tomatoes
"—" denotes releases that did not chart

=== As a featured artist ===
Year	Single	Peak chart positions		Album
Year	Single	US Country	CAN Country	Album
1991	"Rockin' Years" (Dolly Parton featuring Ricky Van Shelton)	1	1	Eagle When She Flies

== Music videos ==
Year	Title	Director
1987	"Crime of Passion"	Marc Ball
1987	"Somebody Lied"	Jim May
1988	"Life Turned Her That Way"	Jim May
1988	"I'll Leave This World Loving You"	Jim May
1989	"Statue of a Fool"	Deaton Flanigen
1990	"Oh Pretty Woman" (live)	Gene Weed
1990	"I Meant Every Word He Said"	Deaton Flanigen
1991	"Rockin' Years" (with Dolly Parton)	Michael Salomon
1991	"I Am a Simple Man"	Deaton Flanigen
1991	"Keep It Between the Lines"	Deaton Flanigen
1991	"I'll Be Home for Christmas"	Deaton Flanigen
1992	"Wear My Ring Around Your Neck"	Deaton Flanigen
1992	"Wild Man"	Deaton Flanigen
1993	"A Couple of Good Years Left"	Deaton Flanigen
1994	"Where Was I"	Deaton Flanigen
1994	"Wherever She Is"	Deaton Flanigen
2000	"Call Me Crazy"	Deaton Flanigen

== Notes ==
- A Don't Overlook Salvation peaked at number 29 on the U.S. Billboard Top Christian Albums chart.
