= 26th TNN/Music City News Country Awards =

US country music awards ceremony in 1992

- Date: June 8, 1992
- Location: Grand Ole Opry House, Nashville, Tennessee
- Hosted by: Alan Jackson; Tanya Tucker

Highlights
- Most wins: Alan Jackson (3)
- Most nominations: Vince Gill (8)

Television/radio coverage
- Network: TNN

The 26th TNN/Music City News Country Awards was held on June 8, 1992, at the Grand Ole Opry House, in Nashville, Tennessee . The ceremony was hosted by Alan Jackson and Tanya Tucker.

== Winners and nominees ==
Winners are shown in bold.

Entertainer of the Year	Album of the Year
**Garth Brooks**; Vince Gill; Alan Jackson; Ricky Van Shelton; George Strait	**Don't Rock the Jukebox — Alan Jackson**; Backroads — Ricky Van Shelton; Chill of an Early Fall — George Strait; Pocket Full of Gold — Vince Gill; Ropin' the Wind — Garth Brooks
Female Artist of the Year	Male Artist of the Year
**Reba McEntire**; Patty Loveless; Lorrie Morgan; Tanya Tucker; Trisha Yearwood	**Alan Jackson**; Garth Brooks; Vince Gill; Ricky Van Shelton; George Strait
Vocal Group of the Year	Vocal Duo of the Year
**The Statlers**; Alabama; Diamond Rio; Oak Ridge Boys; Sawyer Brown	**The Judds**; Baillie and the Boys; Bellamy Brothers; Brooks & Dunn; Sweethearts of the Rodeo
Single of the Year	Video of the Year
"**Don't Rock the Jukebox**" — **Alan Jackson**; "Here's a Quarter (Call Someone Who Cares)" — Travis Tritt; "Keep It Between the Lines" — Ricky Van Shelton; "Look at Us" — Vince Gill; "Shameless" — Garth Brooks	**"Rockin' Years"** — **Dolly Parton** **and** **Ricky Van Shelton**; "Anymore" — Travis Tritt; "Don't Rock the Jukebox" — Alan Jackson; "Look at Us" — Vince Gill; "The Thunder Rolls" — Garth Brooks
Star of Tomorrow	Vocal Collaboration of the Year
**Travis Tritt**; Mark Chesnutt; Joe Diffie; Doug Stone; Trisha Yearwood	**Dolly Parton** **and** **Ricky Van Shelton**; Alan Jackson and George Jones; Patty Loveless and Vince Gill; Mark O'Connor, Vince Gill, Ricky Skaggs and Steve Wariner; Travis Tritt and Marty Stuart
Gospel Act of the Year	Comedian of the Year
**The Chuck Wagon Gang**; The Cathedrals; Cumberland Boys; Fox Brothers; J.D. Sumner and the Stamps	**Ray Stevens**; Andy Andrews; The Geezinslaw Brothers; Steve Hall and Shotgun Red; Williams and Ree
Instrumentalist of the Year
**Vince Gill**; Chet Atkins; Mark O'Connor; Ricky Skaggs; Mike Snider
Living Legend Award
**Roy Rogers**
Minnie Pearl Award
**Emmylou Harris**

== Performers ==
Performer(s)	Song(s)
Tanya Tucker	"If Your Heart Ain't Busy Tonight"
Travis Tritt; Marty Stuart	"This One's Gonna Hurt You (For a Long, Long Time)"
Vince Gill	"Look at Us"
Sawyer Brown	"Some Girls Do"
Alan Jackson	"Midnight in Montgomery"
Steve Wariner	"Midnight Fire"
Joe Diffie; Trisha Yearwood; Mark Chesnutt; Doug Stone	Star of Tomorrow Medley "Ships That Don't Come In" "Wrong Side of Memphis" "Old Flames Have New Names" "Come In Out of the Pain"
Ricky Van Shelton	"Backroads"

== Presenters ==
Presenter(s)	Notes
Patty Loveless; T. Graham Brown	Single of the Year
Diamond Rio; Shotgun Red	Gospel Act of the Year
Oak Ridge Boys; Crystal Gayle	Male Artist of the Year
Oak Ridge Boys; Crystal Gayle	Vocal Collaboration of the Year
The Statlers	Presented Living Legend Award to Roy Rogers
Brooks & Dunn; Linda Davis	Comedian of the Year
The Geezinslaw Brothers; Baillie & the Boys	Vocal Group of the Year
Sweethearts of the Rodeo; Williams and Ree	Video of the Year
Aaron Tippin; Michelle Wright	Vocal Duo of the Year
Billy Dean; Ricky Skaggs	Album of the Year
Holly Dunn; John Anderson	Instrumentalist of the Year
George Jones	Star of Tomorrow
Suzy Bogguss; Randy Travis	Female Artist of the Year
Richard Petty	Presented Minnie Pearl Award to Emmylou Harris
Reba McEntire	Entertainer of the Year

== See also ==
- CMT Music Awards
