= 28th TNN/Music City News Country Awards =

US country music awards ceremony in 1994

- Date: June 6, 1994
- Location: Grand Ole Opry House, Nashville, Tennessee
- Hosted by: Billy Dean; Waylon Jennings; Michelle Wright

Highlights
- Most wins: Alan Jackson (5)
- Most nominations: Vince Gill; Alan Jackson; Reba McEntire (6 each)

Television/radio coverage
- Network: TNN

The 28th TNN/Music City News Country Awards was held on June 6, 1994, at the Grand Ole Opry House, in Nashville, Tennessee . The ceremony was hosted by Billy Dean, Waylon Jennings and Michelle Wright.

== Winners and nominees ==
Winners are shown in bold.

Entertainer of the Year	Album of the Year
**Alan Jackson**; Garth Brooks; Vince Gill; Reba McEntire; George Strait	**A Lot About Livin' (And a Little 'Bout Love) — Alan Jackson**; A Bridge I Didn't Burn — Ricky Van Shelton; Common Thread: The Songs of the Eagles — Various Artists; Easy Come, Easy Go — George Strait; Honky Tonk Angels — Loretta Lynn, Dolly Parton, and Tammy Wynette
Female Artist of the Year	Male Artist of the Year
**Lorrie Morgan**; Reba McEntire; Tanya Tucker; Wynonna; Trisha Yearwood	**Alan Jackson**; Billy Ray Cyrus; Vince Gill; Ricky Van Shelton; George Strait
Vocal Group of the Year	Vocal Duo of the Year
**The Statlers**; The Forester Sisters; Matthews, Wright & King; Oak Ridge Boys; The Whites	**Brooks & Dunn**; Bellamy Brothers; Brother Phelps; Darryl & Don Ellis; Sweethearts of the Rodeo
Vocal Band of the Year	Vocal Collaboration of the Year
**Sawyer Brown**; Alabama; Confederate Railroad; Diamond Rio; Little Texas	**Reba McEntire** **and** **Linda Davis**; Clint Black and Wynonna; Alan Jackson and Keith Whitley; Reba McEntire and Vince Gill; Loretta Lynn, Dolly Parton, and Tammy Wynette
Single of the Year	Video of the Year
"**Chattahoochee**" — **Alan Jackson**; "Does He Love You" — Reba McEntire and Linda Davis; "I Love the Way You Love Me" — John Michael Montgomery; "One More Last Chance" — Vince Gill; "What Part of No" — Lorrie Morgan	"**Chattahoochee**" — **Alan Jackson**; "A Couple of Good Years Left" — Ricky Van Shelton; "Does He Love You" — Reba McEntire and Linda Davis; "I Don't Call Him Daddy" — Doug Supernaw; "One More Last Chance" — Vince Gill
Star of Tomorrow	Gospel Act of the Year
**John Michael Montgomery**; Mark Chesnutt; Billy Ray Cyrus; Sammy Kershaw; Aaron Tippin	**Paul Overstreet**; Cumberland Boys; Barbara Fairchild; Susie Luchsinger; Ricky Skaggs
Comedian of the Year	Instrumentalist of the Year
**Ray Stevens**; Jerry Clower; Jeff Foxworthy; The Geezinslaw Brothers; Lewis Grizzard	**Vince Gill**; Chet Atkins; Mark O'Connor; Marty Stuart; Steve Wariner
Living Legend Award
**Dolly Parton**
Minnie Pearl Award
**Dolly Parton**

== Performers ==
Performer(s)	Song(s)
Sawyer Brown	"The Boys and Me"
Tanya Tucker	"Hangin' In"
Brooks & Dunn	"That Ain't No Way to Go"
Alan Jackson	"Summertime Blues"
Reba McEntire	"She Thinks His Name Was John"
Sammy Kershaw; Aaron Tippin; Mark Chesnutt; John Michael Montgomery	Star of Tomorrow Medley "National Working Woman's Holiday" "Whole Lotta Love on the Line" "It Sure is Monday" "Be My Baby Tonight"
Billy Dean	"Cowboy Band"
Diamond Rio	"Love a Little Stronger"
Waylon Jennings	"You Don't Mess Around with Me"
Billy Ray Cyrus	"Ain't Your Dog No More"
Vince Gill	"Whenever You Come Around"
Michelle Wright	"One Good Man"
The Statlers	"What We Love to Do"
Billy Dean, Lari White, Waylon Jennings; Oak Ridge Boys	"God Bless America" "The Star Spangled Banner"

== Presenters ==
Presenter(s)	Notes
Linda Davis; Doug Stone	Female Artist of the Year
The Geezinslaw Brothers; Susie Luchsinger	Vocal Duo of the Year
Oak Ridge Boys	Album of the Year
Jeff Foxworthy; Lari White	Vocal Group of the Year
John Anderson; Trisha Yearwood	Single of the Year
Neal McCoy; Lisa Stewart	Star of Tomorrow
Dawn Sears; Steve Wariner	Comedian of the Year
Jerry Clower; John Berry	Gospel Act of the Year
Martina McBride; Marty Stuart	Vocal Band of the Year
Brother Phelps; Doug Supernaw	Instrumentalist of the Year
Mark Collie; Sweethearts of the Rodeo	Video of the Year
Ray Stevens; Tammy Wynette	Male Artist of the Year
Faith Hill; Little Texas	Vocal Collaboration of the Year
Vince Gill	Presented Living Legend and Minnie Pearl Award to Dolly Parton
George Jones; Lorrie Morgan	Entertainer of the Year

== See also ==
- CMT Music Awards
