= 29th TNN/Music City News Country Awards =

1995 awards show

- Date: June 5, 1995
- Location: Grand Ole Opry House, Nashville, Tennessee
- Hosted by: Martina McBride; Charley Pride; Marty Stuart

Highlights
- Most wins: Alan Jackson (5)
- Most nominations: Alan Jackson (7)

Television/radio coverage
- Network: TNN

The 29th TNN/Music City News Country Awards was held on June 5, 1995, at the Grand Ole Opry House, in Nashville, Tennessee . The ceremony was hosted by Martina McBride, Charley Pride, and Marty Stuart.

== Winners and nominees ==
Winners are shown in bold.

Entertainer of the Year	Album of the Year
**Alan Jackson**; Vince Gill; Reba McEntire; Ricky Van Shelton; George Strait	**Who I Am — Alan Jackson**; Love and Honor — Ricky Van Shelton; Not a Moment Too Soon — Tim McGraw; Read My Mind — Reba McEntire; When Love Finds You — Vince Gill
Female Artist of the Year	Male Artist of the Year
**Reba McEntire**; Patty Loveless; Lorrie Morgan; Pam Tillis; Tanya Tucker	**Alan Jackson**; Vince Gill; Ricky Van Shelton; George Strait; Marty Stuart
Vocal Group or Duo of the Year	Vocal Band of the Year
**Brooks & Dunn**; Oak Ridge Boys; Sweethearts of the Rodeo; The Statlers; John & Audrey Wiggins	**Sawyer Brown**; Alabama; Confederate Railroad; Diamond Rio; Little Texas
Single of the Year	Video of the Year
"**Livin' on Love**" — **Alan Jackson**; "I Swear" — John Michael Montgomery; "The Man in Love with You" — George Strait; "When Love Finds You" — Vince Gill; "Your Love Amazes Me" — John Berry	**"Independence Day"** — **Martina McBride**; "Livin' on Love" — Alan Jackson; "Summertime Blues" — Alan Jackson; "When Love Finds You" — Vince Gill; "Why Haven't I Heard from You" — Reba McEntire
Star of Tomorrow - Male	Star of Tomorrow - Female
**Tim McGraw**; David Ball; John Berry; Tracy Byrd; Clay Walker	**Faith Hill**; Linda Davis; Tareva Henderson; Alison Krauss; Lari White
Star of Tomorrow - Vocal Group or Duo	Vocal Collaboration of the Year
**BlackHawk**; Darryl & Don Ellis; Terry McBride & the Ride; The Tractors; John & Audrey Wiggins	**George Jones** **and** **Alan Jackson**; Suzy Bogguss and Chet Atkins; Amy Grant and Vince Gill; Conway Twitty and Sam Moore; Trisha Yearwood and Aaron Neville
Christian Country Artist of the Year	Comedian of the Year
**Ricky Van Shelton**; Alison Krauss and The Cox Family; Susie Luchsinger; Paul Overstreet; Ricky Skaggs	**Jeff Foxworthy**; Jeff Dunham and Walter; Steve Hall and Shotgun Red; Mike Snider; Ray Stevens
Living Legend Award
**Waylon Jennings**

== Performers ==
Performer(s)	Song(s)
Martina McBride	"Independence Day"
Alan Jackson	"I Don't Even Know Your Name"
Patty Loveless	"You Don't Even Know Who I Am"
Tracy Byrd; David Ball; Clay Walker; John Berry	Male Star of Tomorrow Medley "The Keeper of the Stars" "Thinkin' Problem" "This Woman and This Man" "Your Love Amazes Me"
Sawyer Brown	"(This Thing Called) Wantin' and Havin' It All"
Vince Gill	"I Can't Tell You Why"
Marty Stuart	"If I Ain't Got You"
Lorrie Morgan	"I Didn't Know My Own Strength"
Charley Pride	"Mountain of Love"
Faith Hill; Linda Davis; Lari White; Tareva Henderson	Female Star of Tomorrow Medley "Piece of My Heart" "If Promises Were Gold" "Now I Know" "The Son of a Preacher Man"
Willie Nelson; Waylon Jennings	Willie and Waylon Medley "Good Hearted Woman" "Mammas Don't Let Your Babies Grow Up to Be Cowboys"
Ricky Van Shelton	"Then for Them"

== Presenters ==
Presenter(s)	Notes
Marty Roe; Lisa Stewart	Album of the Year
Ray Stevens; Mike Snider; Kathie Baillie	Vocal Band of the Year
Sweethearts of the Rodeo; John Michael Montgomery	Male Star of Tomorrow
Tammy Wynette; George Jones	Presented Living Legend Award to Roy Rogers
The Tractors; Michelle Wright	Comedian of the Year
Mark Chesnutt; Ricky Skaggs	Vocal Group or Duo of Tomorrow
Chet Atkins; Suzy Bogguss; Steve Wariner	Male Artist of the Year
Sam Moore; Kenny Chesney; Tim Rushlow	Christian Country Artist of the Year
Aaron Tippin; Ronna Reeves; Ken Mellons	Vocal Group or Duo of the Year
Reba McEntire	Presented Minnie Pearl Award to Willie Nelson
Doug Stone; Susie Luchsinger; Paul Overstreet	Video of the Year
BlackHawk; Lee Roy Parnell	Female Star of Tomorrow
John & Audrey Wiggins; John Anderson; Mark Collie	Vocal Collaboration of the Year
Pam Tillis; Jeff Foxworthy	Single of the Year
The Statlers	Female Artist of the Year
Tanya Tucker	Entertainer of the Year

== See also ==
- CMT Music Awards
