= 31st TNN/Music City News Country Awards =

US country music awards ceremony in 1997

- Date: June 16, 1997
- Location: Grand Ole Opry House, Nashville, Tennessee
- Hosted by: George Jones; LeAnn Rimes; Randy Travis

Highlights
- Most wins: Alan Jackson; Lorrie Morgan (2 each)
- Most nominations: Alan Jackson (7)

Television/radio coverage
- Network: TNN

The 31st TNN/Music City News Country Awards was held on June 16, 1997, at the Grand Ole Opry House, in Nashville, Tennessee . The ceremony was hosted by George Jones, LeAnn Rimes, and Randy Travis.

== Winners and nominees ==
Winners are shown in bold.

Entertainer of the Year	Album of the Year
**Alan Jackson**; Billy Ray Cyrus; Vince Gill; Reba McEntire; George Strait	**Blue Clear Sky — George Strait**; Between Now and Forever — Bryan White; Everything I Love — Alan Jackson; High Lonesome Sound — Vince Gill; Trail of Tears — Billy Ray Cyrus
Female Artist of the Year	Male Artist of the Year
**Lorrie Morgan**; Terri Clark; Faith Hill; Patty Loveless; Reba McEntire	**Alan Jackson**; Billy Ray Cyrus; Vince Gill; George Strait; Bryan White
Vocal Group of the Year	Vocal Duo of the Year
**The Statlers**; 4 Runner; The Forester Sisters; The Moffatts; Oak Ridge Boys	**Brooks & Dunn**; Bellamy Brothers; Darryl & Don Ellis; Regina Regina; Sweethearts of the Rodeo
Vocal Band of the Year	Vocal Collaboration of the Year
**Sawyer Brown**; Alabama; BlackHawk; Diamond Rio; The Mavericks	**Lorrie Morgan** **and** **Jon Randall**; Alan Jackson and Jeff Foxworthy; Dolly Parton and Vince Gill; LeAnn Rimes and Eddy Arnold; Travis Tritt and Marty Stuart
Single of the Year	Video of the Year
"**Trail of Tears**" — **Billy Ray Cyrus**; "Blue" — LeAnn Rimes; "Blue Clear Sky" — George Strait; "Little Bitty" — Alan Jackson; "Worlds Apart" — Vince Gill	"**Then You Can Tell Me Goodbye**" — **Neal McCoy**; "Games Rednecks Play" — Alan Jackson and Jeff Foxworthy; "Little Bitty" — Alan Jackson; "Trail of Tears" — Billy Ray Cyrus; "Worlds Apart" — Vince Gill
Male Star of Tomorrow	Female Star of Tomorrow
**Wade Hayes**; Trace Adkins; Paul Brandt; Ty England; Ty Herndon	**LeAnn Rimes**; Deana Carter; Mindy McCready; Jo Dee Messina; MC Potts
Christian Country Artist of the Year	Comedian of the Year
**Ricky Van Shelton**; Amy Grant; Susie Luchsinger; Paul Overstreet; Ricky Skaggs	**Jeff Foxworthy**; Gary Chapman; Cledus T. Judd; Mike Snider; Ray Stevens
Living Legend Award
**Charley Pride**
Minnie Pearl Award
**George Lindsey**

== See also ==
- CMT Music Awards
