= 30th TNN/Music City News Country Awards =

1996 country music awards ceremony

- Date: June 10, 1996
- Location: Grand Ole Opry House, Nashville, Tennessee
- Hosted by: Martina McBride; Mark Miller; Lorrie Morgan

Highlights
- Most wins: George Strait (3)
- Most nominations: Vince Gill (6)

Television/radio coverage
- Network: TNN

The 30th TNN/Music City News Country Awards was held on June 10, 1996, at the Grand Ole Opry House, in Nashville, Tennessee . The ceremony was hosted by Martina McBride, Mark Miller, and Lorrie Morgan.

== Winners and nominees ==
Winners are shown in bold.

| Entertainer of the Year | Album of the Year |
|---|---|
| **Alan Jackson**; Billy Ray Cyrus; Vince Gill; Reba McEntire; George Strait | **Lead On — George Strait**; One — George Jones and Tammy Wynette; Standing on the Edge — John Berry; Storm in the Heartland — Billy Ray Cyrus; The Woman in Me — Shania Twain |
| Female Artist of the Year | Male Artist of the Year |
| **Lorrie Morgan**; Faith Hill; Martina McBride; Reba McEntire; Shania Twain | **Alan Jackson**; Billy Ray Cyrus; Vince Gill; Ricky Van Shelton; George Strait |
| Vocal Group of the Year | Vocal Duo of the Year |
| **The Statlers**; 4 Runner; The Forester Sisters; The Moffatts; Oak Ridge Boys | **Brooks & Dunn**; Bellamy Brothers; Darryl & Don Ellis; Sweethearts of the Rodeo; John & Audrey Wiggins |
| Vocal Band of the Year | Vocal Collaboration of the Year |
| **Sawyer Brown**; Alabama; Diamond Rio; Alison Krauss & Union Station; The Mavericks | **Vince Gill**, **Patty Loveless** **and** **Ricky Skaggs**; George Jones and Tammy Wynette; Reba McEntire, Linda Davis, Martina McBride and Trisha Yearwood; Dolly Parton and Vince Gill; Shenandoah and Alison Krauss |
| Single of the Year | Video of the Year |
| "**Check Yes or No**" — **George Strait**; "Go Rest High on That Mountain" — Vince Gill; "Gone Country" — Alan Jackson; "I Will Always Love You" — Dolly Parton and Vince Gill; "The Keeper of the Stars" — Tracy Byrd | "**Check Yes or No**" — **George Strait**; "Go Rest High on That Mountain" — Vince Gill; "I Don't Even Know Your Name" — Alan Jackson; "Sold (The Grundy County Auction Incident)" — John Michael Montgomery; "Tell Me I Was Dreaming" — Travis Tritt |
| Male Star of Tomorrow | Female Star of Tomorrow |
| **Bryan White**; Ty England; Wade Hayes; Ty Herndon; David Lee Murphy | **Terri Clark**; Lisa Brokop; Tareva Henderson; Alison Krauss; Chely Wright |
| Christian Country Artist of the Year | Comedian of the Year |
| **Ricky Van Shelton**; Alison Krauss and The Cox Family; Susie Luchsinger; Paul Overstreet; Ricky Skaggs | **Jeff Foxworthy**; Jeff Dunham; Steve Hall and Shotgun Red; Mike Snider; Ray Stevens |
Living Legend Award
**Willie Nelson**
Minnie Pearl Award
**Amy Grant**

== See also ==
- CMT Music Awards
