= 32nd TNN/Music City News Country Awards =

US country music awards ceremony in 1998

- Date: June 15, 1998
- Location: Grand Ole Opry House, Nashville, Tennessee
- Hosted by: Jeff Foxworthy

Highlights
- Most wins: Billy Ray Cyrus (5)
- Most nominations: Billy Ray Cyrus; Alan Jackson; George Strait (6 each)

Television/radio coverage
- Network: TNN

The 32nd TNN/Music City News Country Awards was held on June 15, 1998, at the Grand Ole Opry House, in Nashville, Tennessee . The ceremony was hosted by Jeff Foxworthy.

== Winners and nominees ==
Winners are shown in bold.

Entertainer of the Year	Album of the Year
**Neal McCoy**; Garth Brooks; Billy Ray Cyrus; Alan Jackson; George Strait	**The Best of Billy Ray Cyrus: Cover to Cover — Billy Ray Cyrus**; Carrying Your Love with Me — George Strait; Everything I Love — Alan Jackson; Making Plans — Ricky Van Shelton; You Light Up My Life: Inspirational Songs — LeAnn Rimes
Female Artist of the Year	Male Artist of the Year
**Lorrie Morgan**; Patty Loveless; Martina McBride; LeAnn Rimes; Trisha Yearwood	**Billy Ray Cyrus**; Vince Gill; Alan Jackson; George Strait; Ricky Van Shelton
Vocal Group or Duo of the Year	Vocal Band of the Year
**Brooks & Dunn**; Oak Ridge Boys; The Kinleys; The Lynns; The Statlers	**Sawyer Brown**; Alabama; BlackHawk; Diamond Rio; The Mavericks
Single of the Year	Song of the Year
"**It's All the Same to Me**" — **Billy Ray Cyrus**; "Between the Devil and Me" — Alan Jackson; "Carrying Your Love with Me" — George Strait; "How Do I Live" — Trisha Yearwood; "It's Your Love" — Tim McGraw and Faith Hill	"**It's All the Same to Me**" — **Kerry Kurt Phillips** **and** **Jerry Laseter**; "Carrying Your Love with Me" — Jeff Stevens and Steve Bogard; "How Do I Live" — Diane Warren; "It's Your Love" — Stephony Smith; "There Goes" — Alan Jackson
Male Star of Tomorrow	Female Star of Tomorrow
**Trace Adkins**; James Bonamy; Paul Brandt; Michael Peterson; Kevin Sharp	**Lee Ann Womack**; Deana Carter; The Lynns; Lila McCann; Mindy McCready
Comedian of the Year	Video of the Year
**Gary Chapman**; Bill Engvall; Jeff Foxworthy; Mike Snider; Ray Stevens	**"Three Little Words"** — **Billy Ray Cyrus**; "Carrying Your Love with Me" — George Strait; "It's Your Love" — Tim McGraw and Faith Hill; "The Shake" — Neal McCoy; "Who's Cheatin' Who" — Alan Jackson
Vocal Collaboration of the Year
**"What If I Said"** — **Anita Cochran** **and** **Steve Wariner**; "Helping Me Get Over You" — Lari White and Travis Tritt; "In Another's Eyes" — Trisha Yearwood and Garth Brooks; "It's Your Love" — Tim McGraw and Faith Hill; "You Don't Seem to Miss Me" — Patty Loveless and George Jones
Living Legend Award
**Porter Wagoner**
Minnie Pearl Award
**Reba McEntire**

== See also ==
- CMT Music Awards
