= 27th TNN/Music City News Country Awards =

US country music awards ceremony in 1993

- Date: June 7, 1993
- Location: Grand Ole Opry House, Nashville, Tennessee
- Hosted by: Suzy Bogguss; George Jones; Ricky Van Shelton

Highlights
- Most wins: Vince Gill (4)
- Most nominations: Vince Gill (6)

Television/radio coverage
- Network: TNN

The 27th TNN/Music City News Country Awards was held on June 7, 1993, at the Grand Ole Opry House, in Nashville, Tennessee . The ceremony was hosted by Suzy Bogguss, George Jones and Ricky Van Shelton.

== Winners and nominees ==
Winners are shown in bold.

Entertainer of the Year	Album of the Year
**Alan Jackson**; Garth Brooks; Vince Gill; Reba McEntire; George Strait	**I Still Believe in You — Vince Gill**; A Lot About Livin' (And a Little 'Bout Love) — Alan Jackson; The Chase — Garth Brooks; For My Broken Heart — Reba McEntire; Pure Country — George Strait
Female Artist of the Year	Male Artist of the Year
**Reba McEntire**; Suzy Bogguss; Lorrie Morgan; Tanya Tucker; Wynonna	**Alan Jackson**; Garth Brooks; Vince Gill; Ricky Van Shelton; George Strait
Vocal Group of the Year	Vocal Duo of the Year
**The Statlers**; The Forester Sisters; The Gatlin Brothers; Matthews, Wright & King; Oak Ridge Boys	**Brooks & Dunn**; Bellamy Brothers; Darryl & Don Ellis; The Judds; Sweethearts of the Rodeo
Vocal Band of the Year	Vocal Collaboration of the Year
**Sawyer Brown**; Alabama; Diamond Rio; McBride & the Ride; Shenandoah	**Marty Stuart** **and** **Travis Tritt**; Mary Chapin Carpenter and Joe Diffie; George Jones and Friends; Chris LeDoux and Garth Brooks; Roy Rogers and Clint Black
Single of the Year	Video of the Year
"**I Still Believe in You**" — **Vince Gill**; "Achy Breaky Heart" — Billy Ray Cyrus; "Boot Scootin' Boogie" — Brooks & Dunn; "I Cross My Heart" — George Strait; "The River" — Garth Brooks	**"Midnight in Montgomery"** — **Alan Jackson**; "Achy Breaky Heart" — Billy Ray Cyrus; "I Cross My Heart" — George Strait; "I Don't Need Your Rockin' Chair" — George Jones; "Is There Life Out There" — Reba McEntire
Star of Tomorrow	Gospel Act of the Year
**Doug Stone**; Suzy Bogguss; Billy Ray Cyrus; Billy Dean; Sammy Kershaw	**The Chuck Wagon Gang**; The Cathedrals; Cumberland Boys; Fox Brothers; J.D. Sumner and the Stamps
Comedian of the Year	Instrumentalist of the Year
**Ray Stevens**; Andy Andrews; The Geezinslaw Brothers; Steve Hall and Shotgun Red; Williams and Ree	**Vince Gill**; Chet Atkins; Mark O'Connor; Marty Stuart; Steve Wariner
Living Legend Award
**Kitty Wells**
Minnie Pearl Award
**Vince Gill**

== Performers ==
Performer(s)	Song(s)
George Jones; Ricky Van Shelton; Suzy Bogguss	"I Don't Need Your Rockin' Chair"
Alan Jackson	"Chattahoochee"
Lorrie Morgan	"I Guess You Had to Be There"
Ray Stevens	"If Ten Percent Is Good Enough for Jesus"
Brooks & Dunn	"We'll Burn That Bridge"
Vince Gill	"No Future in the Past"
Reba McEntire	"Fancy"
The Statlers	"Chattanoogie Shoe Shine Boy"
Sammy Kershaw; Shenandoah; Doug Stone; Sawyer Brown	New Talent Medley "Haunted Heart" "I Want to Be Loved Like That" "Too Busy Being in Love" "Thank God for You"
Suzy Bogguss	"Other Side of the Hill"
Ricky Van Shelton	"A Bridge I Didn't Burn"

== Presenters ==
Presenter(s)	Notes
Joe Diffie; Sweethearts of the Rodeo	Album of the Year
The Geezinslaw Brothers; Mark Chesnutt	Vocal Collaboration of the Year
Steve Wariner; Ronna Reeves	Comedian of the Year
Diamond Rio; Lisa Stewart	Vocal Duo of the Year
Hal Ketchum; Darryl & Don Ellis	Instrumentalist of the Year
Aaron Tippin; Matthews, Wright & King	Gospel Group of the Year
Ricky Skaggs	Presented Minnie Pearl Award to Vince Gill
Mark Collie; McBride & the Ride	Vocal Group of the Year
Marty Stuart; Patty Loveless	Star of Tomorrow
Marty Stuart; Patty Loveless	Single of the Year
Dolly Parton	Presented Living Legend Award to Kitty Wells
Billy Ray Cyrus; Michelle Wright	Female Artist of the Year
Martina McBride; Billy Dean	Vocal Band of the Year
Martina McBride; Billy Dean	Video of the Year
Carlene Carter; Oak Ridge Boys	Male Artist of the Year
George Jones; Ricky Van Shelton; Suzy Bogguss	Entertainer of the Year

== See also ==
- CMT Music Awards
