= Greatest Hits Plus =

Greatest hits album by Ricky Van Shelton
- Released: August 11, 1992
- Recorded: 1986–1992
- Genre: Country
- Length: 42:58
- Label: Columbia Nashville/TriStar
- Producer: Steve Buckingham

Ricky Van Shelton chronology
Don't Overlook Salvation (1992)	Greatest Hits Plus (1992)	A Bridge I Didn't Burn (1993)

Singles from Greatest Hits Plus
- 1. "Wear My Ring Around Your Neck" Released: July 1992; 2. "Wild Man" Released: October 24, 1992; 3. "Just as I Am" Released: March 13, 1993

Professional ratings
Review scores
Source	Rating
Allmusic	link

Greatest Hits Plus is the first compilation album by American country music artist Ricky Van Shelton. It contains the hit singles from his first four studio albums, not including his gospel and holiday album.

Three new tracks on the album, including a cover of Elvis Presley's "Wear My Ring Around Your Neck" originally featured on the Honeymoon in Vegas soundtrack, were released as singles and had some chart success.

== Track listing ==
No.	Title	Writer(s)	Length
1.	"Just as I Am" (previously unreleased)	Larry Boone, Paul Nelson	3:10
2.	"Wild Man" (previously unreleased)	Rick Giles. Susan Longacre	3:17
3.	"Somebody Lied"	Joe Chambers, Larry Jenkins	3:21
4.	"I've Cried My Last Tear for You"	Tony King, Chris Waters	2:29
5.	"I'll Leave This World Loving You"	Wayne Kemp, Mack Vickery	3:06
6.	"Statue of a Fool"	Jan Crutchfield	3:04
7.	"I Am a Simple Man"	Walt Aldridge	3:26
8.	"Life Turned Her That Way"	Harlan Howard	3:23
9.	"Keep It Between the Lines"	Russell Smith, Kathy Louvin	3:49
10.	"Rockin' Years" (duet with Dolly Parton)	Floyd Parton	3:25
11.	"From a Jack to a King"	Ned Miller	2:21
12.	"Living Proof"	Steve Clark, Johnny MacRae	3:22
13.	"Don't We All Have the Right"	Roger Miller	2:34
14.	"Wear My Ring Around Your Neck" (previously unreleased on a studio album)	Bert Carroll, Moody Russell	2:11

== Personnel ==
- Eddie Bayers - drums
- Steve Buckingham - acoustic guitar
- Gary Burr - background vocals
- Larry Byrom - acoustic guitar
- Richard Dennison - background vocals
- Paul Franklin - steel guitar, pedabro
- Sonny Garrish - steel guitar
- Steve Gibson - bass guitar, electric guitar, mandolin
- Rob Hajacos - fiddle
- Tommy Hannum - steel guitar
- Hoot Hester - fiddle
- Roy Husky Jr. - upright bass
- Carl Jackson - background vocals
- Bill Lloyd - electric guitar
- Patty Loveless - background vocals
- Randy McCormick - piano
- Terry McMillan - harmonica
- Jimmy Mattingly - fiddle
- Joey Miskulin - accordion
- Farrell Morris - percussion, vibraphone
- Louis Dean Nunley - background vocals
- Jennifer O'Brien - background vocals
- Mark O'Connor - fiddle
- Dolly Parton - duet vocals on "Rockin' Years"
- Don Potter - acoustic guitar
- Tom Robb - bass guitar
- Matt Rollings - piano
- John Wesley Ryles - background vocals
- Ricky Van Shelton - acoustic guitar, lead vocals
- Gary Smith - piano
- Howard Smith - background vocals
- Harry Stinson - background vocals
- Steve Turner - drums
- Paul Uhrig - bass guitar
- Bruce Watkins - acoustic guitar
- Biff Watson - acoustic guitar
- Tommy Wells - drums
- Bergen White - background vocals
- Dennis Wilson - background vocals
- Curtis Young - background vocals

== Chart performance ==
=== Album ===
Chart (1992)	Peak position
U.S. Billboard Top Country Albums	9
U.S. Billboard 200	50

=== Singles ===
Year	Single	Peak positions	
Year	Single	US Country	CAN Country
1992	"Wear My Ring Around Your Neck"	26	29
1992	"Wild Man"	5	4
1993	"Just as I Am"	26	28
