= 23rd Music City News Country Awards =

US country music awards ceremony in 1989

- Date: June 5, 1989
- Location: Grand Ole Opry House, Nashville, Tennessee
- Hosted by: Barbara Mandrell; Louise Mandrell; Irlene Mandrell

Highlights
- Most wins: Ricky Van Shelton (4)
- Most nominations: Ricky Van Shelton (5)

Television/radio coverage
- Network: TNN

The 23rd Music City News Country Awards was held on June 5, 1989, at the Grand Ole Opry House, in Nashville, Tennessee . The ceremony was hosted by Barbara, Louise, and Irlene Mandrell.

== Winners and nominees ==
Winners are shown in bold.

Entertainer of the Year	Album of the Year
**Randy Travis**; Reba McEntire; Ricky Van Shelton; The Statlers; George Strait	**Loving Proof — Ricky Van Shelton**; Chiseled in Stone — Vern Gosdin; If You Ain't Lovin' You Ain't Livin' — George Strait; Old 8x10 — Randy Travis; The Statlers' Greatest Hits — The Statlers
Female Artist of the Year	Male Artist of the Year
**Reba McEntire**; Rosanne Cash; Kathy Mattea; K.T. Oslin; Tanya Tucker	**Ricky Van Shelton**; Vern Gosdin; George Strait; Randy Travis; Hank Williams Jr.; Dwight Yoakam
Vocal Group of the Year	Vocal Duo of the Year
**The Statlers**; Alabama; The Forester Sisters; Highway 101; Oak Ridge Boys	**The Judds**; Bellamy Brothers; The Everly Brothers; The O'Kanes; Sweethearts of the Rodeo
Single of the Year	Video of the Year
"**I'll Leave This World Loving You**" — **Ricky Van Shelton**; "Chiseled in Stone" — Vern Gosdin; "Eighteen Wheels and a Dozen Roses" — Kathy Mattea; "Gonna Take a Lot of River" — Oak Ridge Boys; "Let's Get Started If We're Gonna Break My Heart" — The Statlers	**"I'll Leave This World Loving You"** — **Ricky Van Shelton**; "Eighteen Wheels and a Dozen Roses" — Kathy Mattea; "Gonna Take a Lot of River" — Oak Ridge Boys; "I Told You So" — Randy Travis; "Streets of Bakersfield" — Dwight Yoakam and Buck Owens
Star of Tomorrow	Vocal Collaboration of the Year
**Patty Loveless**; Rodney Crowell; Holly Dunn; Keith Whitley; Dwight Yoakam	**Dwight Yoakam** **and** **Buck Owens**; Rodney Crowell and Rosanne Cash; Loretta Lynn and Conway Twitty; Ricky Skaggs and Sharon White; Tanya Tucker, Paul Davis, and Paul Overstreet
Gospel Act of the Year	Comedian of the Year
**The Whites**; The Cathedrals; The Chuck Wagon Gang; Cumberland Boys; Fox Brothers	**Ray Stevens**; Andy Andrews; Jerry Clower; Shotgun Red; Williams and Ree
Instrumentalist of the Year	TV Series of the Year
**Ricky Skaggs**; Chet Atkins; Roy Clark; Charlie Daniels; Mike Snider	**Nashville Now**; Austin City Limits; Dolly; Hee Haw; This Week in Country Music
TV Special of the Year
**A Country Music Celebration: 30th Anniversary of the Country Music Association**; Grand Ole Opry Live Special; Hee Haw Anniversary; Merle Haggard: Poet of the Common Man; USO Celebrity Tour: Lee Greenwood
Living Legend Award
**Johnny Cash**

== See also ==
- CMT Music Awards
