= Inside Out (Charlie Major album) =

Studio album by Charlie Major
- Released: April 24, 2004
- Genre: Country
- Length: 40:29
- Label: Stony Plain
- Producer: Charlie Major

Charlie Major chronology
444 (2000)	Inside Out (2004)	Shadows and Light (2006)

Inside Out is the sixth album released by Canadian country music singer Charlie Major. The album was written and produced entirely by Major. Among the tracks is his own rendition of "Backroads", a song which Major originally wrote for Ricky Van Shelton, who released it as a single from his 1991 album Backroads.

== Track listing ==
All songs written by Charlie Major.

1. "When You're Good, You're Good" - 3:41
2. "You'd Better Go" - 4:05
3. "I'm Still Looking" - 3:43
4. "My Brother and Me" - 4:22
5. "Just for Old Times" - 4:03
6. "I'm Alright" - 3:03
7. "Last Peaceful Place" - 4:30
8. "The Face of Love" - 4:40
9. "Nothing but Alone Again" - 4:04
10. "Backroads" - 4:18

== Personnel ==
- Eddie Bayers - drums
- J. T. Corenflos - electric guitar
- Dan Dugmore - acoustic guitar
- B. James Lowry - acoustic guitar
- Brent Mason - electric guitar
- Mike McAdam - mandolin
- Garry Primm - piano
- Michael Rhodes - bass
- Popcorn Rondini - accordion
- Harry Stinson - backing vocals, percussion
- Pete Wasmer - organ
- Joy Lynn White - backing vocals
