= Shadows and Light =

Shadows and Light may refer to:

- Shadows and Light (Charlie Major album), 2006
- Shadows and Light (Joni Mitchell album), 1980
- Shadows and Light (Wilson Phillips album), 1992
- "Shadows and Light" (Yin Yang Yo!), a 2007 TV episode
- "Shadows and Light" (Star Wars Tales), a 2005 comics story
- "Shadows & Light" (Spider-Woman), a 2001 comics story

== See also ==
- Light and Shadows, a 1997 album by Casiopea
