= You've Got a Friend (disambiguation) =

"You've Got a Friend" is a 1971 song written and originally performed by Carole King.

You've Got a Friend may also refer to:

== Music ==
- You've Got a Friend (Andy Williams album), 1971
- You've Got a Friend (Susie Luchsinger album), 2003
- You've Got a Friend (Johnny Mathis album), 1971
- "You've Got a Friend" (Sonia and Big Fun song), 1990

== Television ==
- You've Got a Friend (TV program), a 2004 reality television program that aired on MTV

== See also ==
- "You've Got a Friend in Me", a 1995 song by Randy Newman
