= Just Say Goodbye =

Just Say Goodbye may refer to:

- A 1966 song by Petula Clark from My Love
- A 1998 song by Ricky Van Shelton from Making Plans
- A 2001 song written for the movie Turning Paige by Michael Shields
- A 2016 song by Wilco on their album Schmilco
