= Blue Christmas (Ricky Van Shelton album) =

Studio album by Ricky Van Shelton
- Released: October 10, 2000
- Genre: Country, Christmas
- Length: 27:59
- Label: Audium
- Producer: Ricky Van Shelton

Ricky Van Shelton chronology
Fried Green Tomatoes (2000)	Blue Christmas (2000)	His Very Best (2006)

Professional ratings
Review scores
Source	Rating
Allmusic	link

Blue Christmas is the second album of Christmas music by country music artist Ricky Van Shelton. It features one original song and several others that were reprised from his first Christmas album, Ricky Van Shelton Sings Christmas.

== Track listing ==
1. "Blue Christmas" (Bill Hayes, Jay Johnson) - 3:05
2. "Silver Bells" (Ray Evans, Jay Livingston) - 2:55
3. "Winter Wonderland" (Felix Bernard, Dick Smith) - 2:34
4. "Let It Snow! Let It Snow! Let It Snow!" (Sammy Cahn, Jule Styne) - 2:31
5. "Country Christmas" (Don Schlitz, Ricky Van Shelton) - 2:52
6. "Jingle Bell Rock" (Joe Beal, Jim Boothe) - 2:52
7. "Silent Night" (Franz Xaver Gruber, Joseph Mohr) - 3:25
8. "I Heard the Bells on Christmas Day" (Traditional) - 3:12
9. "O Come All Ye Faithful" (Frederick Oakeley, John Francis Wade) - 3:51
10. "Have Yourself a Merry Little Christmas" (Ralph Blane, Hugh Martin) - 3:34

== Personnel ==
- Eddie Bayers - drums, percussion
- Pat Coil - keyboards, synthesizer
- Larry Franklin - fiddle
- Sonny Garrish - steel guitar
- Wes Hightower - background vocals
- John Hobbs - keyboards, piano
- Jim Hoke - saxophone
- Terry McMillan - harmonica
- Liana Manis - background vocals
- Brent Mason - electric guitar
- Larry Paxton - bass guitar
- John Wesley Ryles - background vocals
- Ricky Van Shelton - lead vocals
- Biff Watson - acoustic guitar

== Chart performance ==
Chart (2000)	Peak position
U.S. Billboard Top Country Albums	58
U.S. Billboard Top Independent Albums	46
