= Wild Man (Ricky Van Shelton song) =

Single by Ricky Van Shelton

from the album Greatest Hits Plus
- B-side: "If You're Ever in My Arms"
- Released: October 24, 1992
- Recorded: March 30, 1992
- Genre: Country
- Length: 3:17
- Label: Columbia Nashville #74748
- Songwriter: Rick Giles; Susan Longacre
- Producer: Steve Buckingham

Ricky Van Shelton singles chronology
"Wear My Ring Around Your Neck" (1992)	"Wild Man" (1992)	"Just as I Am" (1993)

"Wild Man" is a song written by Susan Longacre and Rick Giles, and recorded by American country music singer Ricky Van Shelton. It was released in October 1992 as the second single from his compilation album Greatest Hits Plus. The song spent twenty weeks on the Hot Country Singles & Tracks charts, where it peaked at number 5. It was his last Top Ten hit on the country music charts.

== Chart performance ==
Chart (1992–1993)	Peak position
Canada Country Singles (RPM)	4
US Hot Country Songs (Billboard)	5

=== Year-end charts ===
Chart (1993)	Position
Canada Country Tracks (RPM)	45
