= 1989 TNN Viewers' Choice Awards =

American country music award

- Date: April 25, 1989
- Location: Grand Ole Opry House, Nashville, Tennessee
- Hosted by: Ricky Van Shelton; Rodney Crowell; Kathy Mattea; Ralph Emery

Highlights
- Most wins: Ricky Van Shelton (3)
- Most nominations: Ricky Van Shelton (5)

Television/radio coverage
- Network: TNN

The 1989 TNN Viewers' Choice Awards was held on April 25, 1989, at the Grand Ole Opry House, in Nashville, Tennessee . The ceremony was hosted by Kathy Mattea, Rodney Crowell, Ricky Van Shelton and Ralph Emery.

== Winners and nominees ==
Winners are shown in bold.

Favorite Entertainer of the Year	Favorite Album of the Year
**Randy Travis**; The Judds; Reba McEntire; Ricky Van Shelton; George Strait; Hank Williams Jr.	**Old 8x10 — Randy Travis**; Buenas Noches from a Lonely Room — Dwight Yoakam; Chiseled in Stone — Vern Gosdin; If You Ain't Lovin' You Ain't Livin' — George Strait; Loving Proof — Ricky Van Shelton; This Woman — K.T. Oslin
Favorite Female Vocalist of the Year	Favorite Male Vocalist of the Year
**Reba McEntire**; Rosanne Cash; Emmylou Harris; Kathy Mattea; K.T. Oslin; Tanya Tucker	**Ricky Van Shelton**; Rodney Crowell; George Strait; Randy Travis; Hank Williams Jr.; Dwight Yoakam
Favorite Newcomer of the Year	Favorite Group of the Year
**Shenandoah**; Baillie & the Boys; Skip Ewing; David Lynn Jones; Jo-El Sonnier; Keith Whitley	**The Oak Ridge Boys**; Alabama; Highway 101; The Judds; The Nitty Gritty Dirt Band; Sweethearts of the Rodeo
Favorite Song of the Year	Favorite Video of the Year
"**I'll Leave This World Loving You**" — **Ricky Van Shelton**; "Don't Close Your Eyes" — Keith Whitley; "Eighteen Wheels and a Dozen Roses" — Kathy Mattea; "If You Ain't Lovin' (You Ain't Livin')" — George Strait; "Streets of Bakersfield" — Dwight Yoakam and Buck Owens; "Strong Enough to Bend" — Tanya Tucker	"**I'll Leave This World Loving You**" — **Ricky Van Shelton**; "Eighteen Wheels and a Dozen Roses" — Kathy Mattea; "Gonna Take a Lot of River" — The Oak Ridge Boys; "Streets of Bakersfield" — Dwight Yoakam and Buck Owens; "Strong Enough to Bend" — Tanya Tucker; "Young Country" — Hank Williams Jr.

== See also ==
- CMT Music Awards
