= 1988 TNN Viewers' Choice Awards =

American country music award

- Date: April 26, 1988
- Location: Grand Ole Opry House, Nashville, Tennessee
- Hosted by: Willie Nelson; K.T. Oslin; The Oak Ridge Boys; Ralph Emery

Highlights
- Most wins: Randy Travis (5)
- Most nominations: Randy Travis; George Strait (5 each)

Television/radio coverage
- Network: TNN

The 1988 TNN Viewers' Choice Awards was held on April 26, 1988, at the Grand Ole Opry House, in Nashville, Tennessee . The ceremony was hosted by Willie Nelson, K.T. Oslin, The Oak Ridge Boys and Ralph Emery.

== Winners and nominees ==
Winners are shown in bold.

Favorite Entertainer of the Year	Favorite Album of the Year
**Randy Travis**; Reba McEntire; Dolly Parton; Ricky Skaggs; George Strait; Hank Williams Jr.	**Always & Forever — Randy Travis**; 80's Ladies — K.T. Oslin; Born to Boogie — Hank Williams Jr.; King's Record Shop — Rosanne Cash; Ocean Front Property — George Strait; Trio — Dolly Parton, Linda Ronstadt, Emmylou Harris
Favorite Female Vocalist of the Year	Favorite Male Vocalist of the Year
**Reba McEntire**; Rosanne Cash; Emmylou Harris; Kathy Mattea; Dolly Parton; Tanya Tucker	**Randy Travis**; George Jones; Ronnie Milsap; Ricky Skaggs; George Strait; Hank Williams Jr.
Favorite Newcomer of the Year	Favorite Group of the Year
**Ricky Van Shelton**; T. Graham Brown; Holly Dunn; Highway 101; The O'Kanes; K.T. Oslin	**The Oak Ridge Boys**; Alabama; The Forester Sisters; The Judds; The Nitty Gritty Dirt Band; Restless Heart
Favorite Song of the Year	Favorite Video of the Year
"**Forever and Ever, Amen**" — **Randy Travis**; "80's Ladies" — K.T. Oslin; "All My Ex's Live in Texas" — George Strait; "Ocean Front Property" — George Strait; "Somebody Lied" — Ricky Van Shelton; "The Last One to Know" — Reba McEntire	"**Forever and Ever, Amen**" — **Randy Travis**; "80's Ladies" — K.T. Oslin; "A Long Line of Love" — Michael Martin Murphey; "My Name is Bocephus" — Hank Williams Jr.; "Tennessee Flat Top Box" — Rosanne Cash; "The Last One to Know" — Reba McEntire

== See also ==
- CMT Music Awards
