= Grit, Virginia =

Unincorporated community in Virginia, US

Coordinates: 37°04′35″N 79°14′52″W

Grit is an unincorporated community in Pittsylvania County, in the U.S. state of Virginia.

It is the home of Ricky Van Shelton and the 2021 Southern New Hampshire University Commencement Speaker Jesse Baker.
