= Where Was I (song) =

Single by Ricky Van Shelton

from the album A Bridge I Didn't Burn
- Released: January 10, 1994
- Genre: Country
- Length: 3:11
- Label: Columbia Nashville
- Songwriters: Gary Burr, Harry Stinson
- Producer: Steve Buckingham

Ricky Van Shelton singles chronology
"A Couple of Good Years Left" (1993)	"Where Was I" (1994)	"Wherever She Is" (1994)

"Where Was I" is a song written by Gary Burr and Harry Stinson, and recorded by American country music artist Ricky Van Shelton. It was released in January 1994 as the second single from the album A Bridge I Didn't Burn. The song reached number 20 on the Billboard Hot Country Singles & Tracks chart, and was the last top 40 country hit of his career.

== Chart performance ==
"Where Was I" debuted at number 70 on the U.S. Billboard Hot Country Singles & Tracks for the week of January 15, 1994.

Chart (1994)	Peak position
Canada Country Singles (RPM)	9
US Hot Country Songs (Billboard)	20
