= Count It All Joy =

Studio album by Susie Luchsinger
- Released: May 3, 2005
- Genre: Gospel
- Label: New Haven
- Producer: Various

Susie Luchsinger chronology
| You've Got A Friend (2003) | Count It All Joy (2005) | Let Go (2008) |

Count It All Joy is the ninth album from American gospel music artist Susie Luchsinger. It was released on May 3, 2005 on New Haven Records.

== Track listing ==
1. "Count It All Joy" (Kenna Turner West) - 3:52
2. "Always, Always" (Bill Aerts, Scott Lynch) - 4:29
3. "There's Still Hope" (Adam Wheeler) - 4:10
4. "Slow Dance More" (Doug Johnson, Pat Bunch) - 3:10
5. "What We've Been Praying For" (Brent Wilson) - 3:52
6. "The Bride" (Adam Wheeler, Tony Haselden) - 4:32
7. "Then They Do" (Jim Collins, Sunny Russ) - 4:09
8. "Someday I Know" (Mike Bowling) - 2:35
9. "Sittin' At A Red Light" (Ray Stephenson, Steve Williams, Willis R. Nance) - 4:00
10. "Parable of the Windmill" (John Gaither) - 3:33
11. "Untitled Hymn (Come to Jesus)" (Chris Rice) - 4:00

== Personnel ==
- Kelly Back - electric guitar
- Lori Brooks - background vocals
- Margie Cates - background vocals
- Richard Dennison - background vocals
- Stuart Duncan - fiddle, mandolin
- James Easter - background vocals
- Sonny Garrish - dobro, steel guitar
- Ranger Doug Green - archguitar
- David Hungate - bass guitar
- Shane Keister - piano
- Paul Leim - drums, percussion
- Ronnie Light - background vocals
- Susie Luchsinger - lead vocals
- Brent Mason - electric guitar
- Gordon Mote - piano
- Gary Prim - piano
- Bryan Sutton - acoustic guitar
- Jeff Taylor - accordion
- Darrin Vincent - background vocals
- Pete Wade - gut string guitar
- Kris Wilkinson - string contractor
- Andrea Zonn - background vocals

== Awards ==
The album was nominated for a Dove Award for Country Album of the Year at the 37th GMA Dove Awards.
