= After the Lights Go Out =

Single by Ricky Van Shelton

from the album Backroads
- B-side: "Oh Heart of Mine"
- Released: November 1991
- Genre: Country
- Length: 3:19
- Label: Columbia Nashville
- Songwriter: Warner McPherson
- Producer: Steve Buckingham

Ricky Van Shelton singles chronology
| "Keep It Between the Lines" (1991) | "After the Lights Go Out" (1991) | "Backroads" (1992) |

"After the Lights Go Out" is a country music song written by Warner Mack (credited to his real name, Warner McPherson) and originally released in 1973. It was later recorded by American country music singer Ricky Van Shelton. It was released in November 1991 as the third single from his album Backroads. The song peaked at #13 on the U.S. country chart and at #8 in Canada.

== Chart positions ==
| Chart (1991–1992) | Peak position |
|---|---|
| Canada Country Singles (RPM) | 8 |
| US Hot Country Songs (Billboard) | 13 |

=== Year-end charts ===
| Chart (1992) | Position |
|---|---|
| Canada Country Tracks (RPM) | 76 |
