= Let Go (Susie Luchsinger album) =

Studio album by Susie Luchsinger
- Released: November 7, 2008
- Genre: Gospel
- Label: SLM Records
- Producer: Billy Aerts

Susie Luchsinger chronology
Count It All Joy (2005)	Let Go (2008)

Let Go is the tenth album from American gospel music artist Susie Luchsinger. It was released on November 7, 2008 on SLM Records. It features the song "Sky Full Of Angels" which was originally recorded by her sister Reba McEntire on her album Room to Breathe back in 2003, and "Sticks and Stones" which is composed by Tim Matthews, Susie Luchsinger, and her niece Autumn McEntire.

== Track listing ==
1. "Never Alone" (Sarah Buxton, Gary S. Burr, Victoria Shaw)
2. "Sky Full Of Angels" (Burton Collins, Clay Mills, Lisa Stewart)
3. "Sticks and Stones" (Autumn McEntire, Tim Matthews, Susie Luchsinger) - 4:04
4. "Lily of the Field" (Chapin Hartford) - 3:40
5. "In The Name of Jesus" (Steve Bard) - 3:29
6. "Let Go" (Amy Douglas) - 3:41
7. "Less One Day" (John Ritter, Billy Aerts)
8. "Cowboy Medley" (Tim Spencer, Cole Porter, Robert Fletcher, Dale Evans Rogers)
9. "Amazing Grace (My Chains Are Gone)" (Chris Tomlin)
10. "Help Is On The Way" (Barrie Shorrock)
11. "If There Hadn't Been You" (Ron Hellard, Tom Shapir) - 3:24
12. "Old Chunk of Coal" (Billy Joe Shaver) - 3:30
13. "I Will Rest In You" (Billy Aerts, Burton Collins)
