= Just as I Am (Ricky Van Shelton song) =

Single by Ricky Van Shelton

from the album Greatest Hits Plus
- B-side: "Slam That Door"
- Released: March 13, 1993
- Recorded: March 30, 1992
- Genre: Country
- Length: 3:08
- Label: Columbia
- Songwriter(s): Larry Boone, Paul Nelson
- Producer(s): Steve Buckingham

Ricky Van Shelton singles chronology
"Wild Man" (1992)	"Just as I Am" (1993)	"A Couple of Good Years Left" (1993)

"Just as I Am" is a song recorded by American country music artist Ricky Van Shelton. It was released in March 1993 as the third single from his Greatest Hits Plus compilation album. The song reached #26 on the Billboard Hot Country Singles & Tracks chart. The song was written by Larry Boone and Paul Nelson.

== Chart performance ==
Chart (1993)	Peak position
US Hot Country Songs (Billboard)	26
Canadian RPM Country Tracks	28
