= Shadows and Light (Charlie Major album) =

Studio album by Charlie Major
- Released: October 17, 2006
- Genre: Country
- Length: 48:00
- Label: Koch Entertainment Canada
- Producer: Jason Barry, Charlie Major

Charlie Major chronology
Inside Out (2004)	Shadows and Light (2006)	Collections (2006)

Shadows and Light is the seventh album released by Canadian country music singer Charlie Major. The album was written entirely by Major, and includes a duet with Kim Mitchell ("Young at Heart").

== Track listing ==
All tracks written by Charlie Major.

1. "Simple Plan" – 5:00
2. "Better World" – 3:57
3. "That’s When I Feel Loved" – 4:07
4. "You’ll See Angels" – 4:56
5. "There’s No Easy Way to Say Goodbye" – 4:37
6. "Young at Heart" – 3:56
  - duet with Kim Mitchell
7. "Whispering Your Name" – 4:19
8. "True Love Street" – 3:24
9. "Shadows and Light" – 4:46
10. "Already Gone" – 4:18
11. "Mandy" – 4:40
