= Sawyer Brown =

American country music band

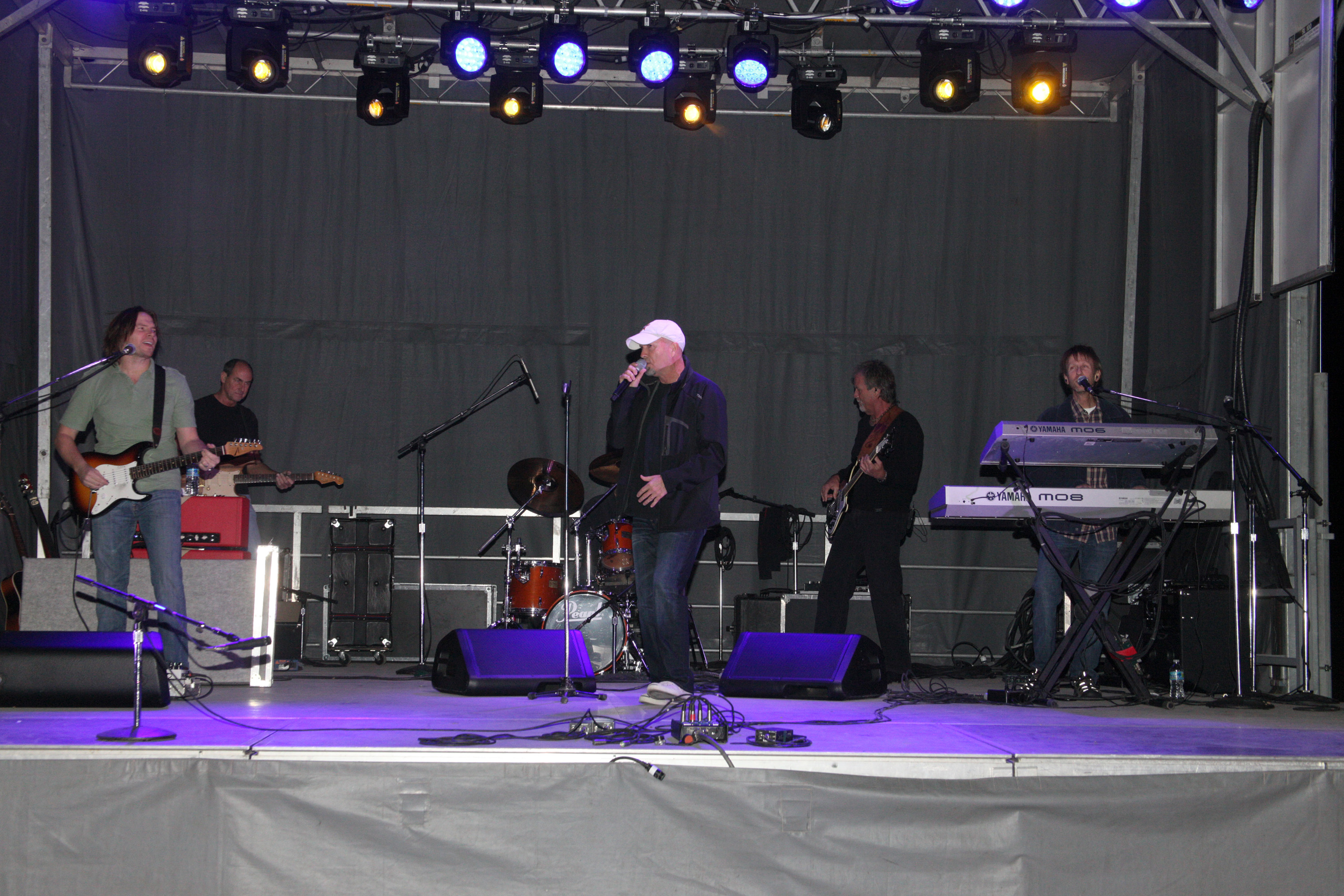
- Sawyer Brown performing in 2012

Background information
- Also known as: Savanna
- Origin: Apopka, Florida, United States
- Genres: Country; country pop; country rock; Christian
- Years active: 1981–present
- Labels: Capitol; Curb; Lyric Street; Beach Street
- Members: Mark Miller; Gregg "Hobie" Hubbard; Joe "Curly" Smyth; Shayne Hill; Nathan Winkler
- Past members: Bobby Randall; Duncan Cameron; Jim Scholten
- Website: https://sawyerbrown.com/

Sawyer Brown is an American country music band. It was founded in 1981 in Apopka, Florida, by Mark Miller (lead vocals, rhythm guitar), Gregg "Hobie" Hubbard (keyboards, vocals), Bobby Randall (lead guitar, vocals), Joe "Curly" Smyth (drums), and Jim Scholten (bass guitar). The five musicians were originally members of country singer Don King's road band, but chose to stay together after King retired in 1981. After competing on the television competition series Star Search and winning that show's grand prize, they signed to Capitol Records in 1984. The band recorded for Capitol between then and 1991, and for Curb Records between 1991 and 2005, except for a short time in 2003 when they were signed to Lyric Street Records. Duncan Cameron, formerly of the Amazing Rhythm Aces, replaced Randall in 1991, and Shayne Hill replaced him in 2004. In 2020 Jim Stepped down as bassist and Nathan Winkler replaced him. Nathan has also been their monitor technician since 2018.

Sawyer Brown has released 18 studio albums and has charted over 50 times on the Hot Country Songs charts, including three No. 1 singles: "Step That Step" (1985), "Some Girls Do" (1992), and "Thank God for You" (1993). The band's sound is largely defined by country pop and rock music influences, with cover versions of songs by George Jones, Michael Johnson, and Dave Dudley also among their hit singles. Artists with whom they have collaborated include Randy Scruggs, Joe Bonsall, and Mac McAnally.

== History ==
The group's members were originally part of country pop singer Don King's road band. When King stopped touring in 1981, the group decided to stay together. The band played up to five sets a night, six days a week (for a time at Knight's Corral, on Nolensville Rd., in Nashville, as "Bobby, Mark, and Sandgap"), until they auditioned for the TV show Star Search in 1983. They won the grand prize of $100,000 and a recording contract.

The band originally chose the name Savanna. When another band with a similar name emerged, the group decided to change its own moniker. They met at their manager's office in Nashville and began looking through area telephone books for inspiration. They blindly landed on the name of a nearby thoroughfare, Sawyer Brown Road, and derived the new band name "Sawyer Brown".

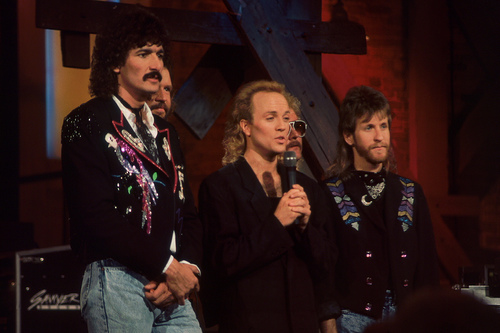
Sawyer Brown, 1987

The band signed with Capitol Records and scored a Top 20 hit with their first single, "Leona", in 1984. That success was quickly followed by their first No. 1 hit, "Step That Step". The band had their ups and downs on the charts throughout the 1980s, landing only sporadic Top 10 hits. However, by 1990 they had accumulated enough hits for a Greatest Hits package, and were successful on the touring circuit.

Originally, Sawyer Brown was known for a primarily country pop sound dominated largely by novelty tunes; by 1991, however, the band began to express a more serious side to its music by adding ballads to its repertoire. That year, the band also dropped its affiliation with Capitol, and Curb Records assumed promotion and distribution of all subsequent albums and singles (except for 2003, when Sawyer Brown temporarily switched to Lyric Street Records). Bobby Randall also left the band in 1991, and was replaced by Duncan Cameron. Cameron subsequently departed in 2004, with Shayne Hill assuming the role of lead guitarist.

In 1991, after the release of their album Buick, guitarist Bobby Randall left the group to remain close to his family and host a short-lived TV talent show, Be a Star. Bobby Randall joined to band called "Dallas County Line" formed in Birmingham, Alabama, in late 1991 & early 2003 are disbanded. Duncan Cameron, formerly of The Amazing Rhythm Aces, was chosen as his replacement just as Sawyer Brown was about to become country music's "it" band. The band then switched labels, moving to Curb Records and releasing the albums The Dirt Road, Café on the Corner, and Outskirts of Town, which saw hit after hit for the band in the early to mid-1990s.

Part of the band's new-found success was due to singer-songwriter Mac McAnally, who wrote several songs for the group. The McAnally-penned songs, mostly ballads, helped to redefine Sawyer Brown, who up until this point had been reviled by many critics for being a flamboyant "bubble gum" pop act that emphasized style over substance. "The Walk", the final single off the Buick album, is said to be the turning point for the group.

Following "The Walk", the band scored a number of Top 5 and Top 10 hits, including 2 more Billboard No. 1s with 1992's "Some Girls Do", and 1993's "Thank God for You", which Mark Miller co-wrote with Mac McAnally. By 1995, Sawyer Brown had enough hits for a second Greatest Hits package. The album, titled Greatest Hits 1990 to 1995, included two new singles, "This Time" and "I Don't Believe in Goodbye", which themselves became Top 5 hits.

In the latter half of the 1990s, the group seemed to gradually fall out of favor with country radio, despite a crossover hit in 1999 with "Drive Me Wild". They parted ways with Curb in 2003 and signed with Lyric Street Records. One single was released on Lyric Street before Sawyer Brown left that label as well. 2004 saw the group returning to Curb Records, just as Duncan Cameron decided to leave the group to pursue a lifelong dream of flying for Southwest Airlines. Guitarist Shayne Hill replaced Duncan's post as guitarist, although both Cameron and Hill are in the credits on Mission Temple Fireworks Stand. The album's title track, featuring Robert Randolph, peaked at No. 55. The second single off that album, "They Don't Understand", was a minor Top 40 hit on the country charts, and Top 20 on the Christian single charts.

Sawyer Brown has released twenty-four albums (18 studio, 1 live and 5 compilation), of which three have been certified gold in the United States for sales of 500,000 copies. More than 50 of their singles have entered the U.S. Billboard Hot Country Songs charts, including three Number One singles. Sawyer Brown also received a Horizon Award from the Country Music Association in 1985, as well as a Vocal Group of the Year award in 1997 from the Academy of Country Music and five Vocal Band of The Year Awards from the TNN Music City News Country Awards.

Sawyer Brown wrote "The Nebraska Song" in honor of Brook Berringer, a Nebraska Cornhuskers quarterback who died in a plane crash on April 18, 1996. (The song was actually written before his death.) The song appears on the group's album Six Days on the Road. Mark Miller also served as a pallbearer at Berringer's funeral. In 1998, the band appeared at the Unforgiven: In Your House Pay Per View and performed a lip synced version of "Some Girls Do" with Jeff Jarrett.

In the early 2000s, Mark Miller formed Christian music label Beach Street Records. One of the first acts he began producing for the label was Casting Crowns. In August 2021, bass guitarist Jim Scholten left Sawyer Brown after a performance in Seattle, Washington, at which point Nathan Winkler joined the group's touring band as bassist. Scholten's departure left Miller, Hubbard and Smyth as the three remaining original members.

== Discography ==
=== Studio albums ===
- Sawyer Brown (1984)
- Shakin' (1985)
- Out Goin' Cattin' (1986)
- Somewhere in the Night (1987)
- Wide Open (1988)
- The Boys Are Back (1989)
- Buick (1991)
- The Dirt Road (1992)
- Cafe on the Corner (1992)
- Outskirts of Town (1993)
- This Thing Called Wantin' and Havin' It All (1995)
- Six Days on the Road (1997)
- Hallelujah, He Is Born (1997)
- Drive Me Wild (1999)
- Can You Hear Me Now (2002)
- Mission Temple Fireworks Stand (2005)
- Rejoice (2008)
- Travelin' Band (2011)
- Desperado Troubadours (2024)

== Awards and nominations ==
=== Grammy Awards ===
Year	Nominee / work	Award	Result
1994	"All These Years"	Best Country Performance by a Duo or Group with Vocal	Nominated

=== American Music Awards ===
Year	Nominee / work	Award	Result
1987	Sawyer Brown	Favorite Country Band/Duo/Group Video Artist	Nominated
1993	Sawyer Brown	Favorite Country Band/Duo/Group	Nominated
1998	Sawyer Brown	Favorite Country Band/Duo/Group	Nominated

=== Music City News Country Awards & TNN/Music City News Country Awards ===
Year	Nominee / work	Award	Result
1986	Sawyer Brown	Star of Tomorrow	Nominated
1986	Sawyer Brown	Vocal Group of the Year	Nominated
1992	Sawyer Brown	Vocal Group of the Year	Nominated
1993	Sawyer Brown	Vocal Band of the Year	Won
1994	Sawyer Brown	Vocal Band of the Year	Won
1995	Sawyer Brown	Vocal Band of the Year	Won
1996	Sawyer Brown	Vocal Band of the Year	Won
1997	Sawyer Brown	Vocal Band of the Year	Won
1998	Sawyer Brown	Vocal Band of the Year	Won
1999	Sawyer Brown	Vocal Band of the Year	Nominated

=== Academy of Country Music Awards ===
Year	Nominee / work	Award	Result
1986	Sawyer Brown	Top Vocal Group of the Year	Nominated
1993	Sawyer Brown	Top Vocal Group of the Year	Nominated
1994	Sawyer Brown	Top Vocal Group of the Year	Nominated
1995	Sawyer Brown	Top Vocal Group of the Year	Nominated
1995	"This Time"	Video of the Year	Nominated
1996	Sawyer Brown	Top Vocal Group of the Year	Nominated
1997	Sawyer Brown	Top Vocal Group of the Year	Won
1998	Sawyer Brown	Top Vocal Duo or Group of the Year	Nominated
1999	Sawyer Brown	Top Vocal Duo or Group of the Year	Nominated
1999	"Drive Me Wild"	Video of the Year	Nominated
2000	Sawyer Brown	Top Vocal Duo or Group of the Year	Nominated
2000	Sawyer Brown	Entertainer of the Year	Nominated
2001	Sawyer Brown	Top Vocal Duo or Group of the Year	Nominated

=== Country Music Association Awards ===
Year	Nominee / work	Award	Result
1985	Sawyer Brown	Horizon Award	Won
1992	Sawyer Brown	Vocal Group of the Year	Nominated
1993	Sawyer Brown	Vocal Group of the Year	Nominated
1994	Sawyer Brown	Vocal Group of the Year	Nominated
1995	Sawyer Brown	Vocal Group of the Year	Nominated
1996	Sawyer Brown	Vocal Group of the Year	Nominated
1997	Sawyer Brown	Vocal Group of the Year	Nominated
1998	Sawyer Brown	Vocal Group of the Year	Nominated
