= Backroads (song) =

Single by Ricky Van Shelton

from the album Backroads
- B-side: "Call Me Up"
- Released: March 16, 1992
- Recorded: December 20, 1990
- Genre: Country
- Length: 3:43
- Label: Columbia Nashville #74258
- Songwriter: Charlie Major
- Producer: Steve Buckingham

Ricky Van Shelton singles chronology
"After the Lights Go Out" (1991)	"Backroads" (1992)	"Wear My Ring Around Your Neck" (1992)

"Backroads" is a song written by Canadian country music artist Charlie Major, and recorded by American country music singer Ricky Van Shelton. It was released in March 1992 as the fourth single and title track from his album Backroads. It had previously served as the b-side to that album's earlier single "I Am a Simple Man."

Major won SOCAN Song of the Year at the 1993 Canadian Country Music Association Awards. He later recorded the song on his 2004 album Inside Out.

== Chart performance ==
"Backroads" spent twenty weeks on the Hot Country Songs charts, peaking at #2 for one week. It also reached #3 on the Canadian country music charts published by RPM.

Chart (1992)	Peak position
Canada Country Singles (RPM)	3
US Hot Country Songs (Billboard)	2

=== Year-end charts ===
Chart (1992)	Position
Canada Country Tracks (RPM)	33
US Country Songs (Billboard)	35
