= Don't Overlook Salvation =

Studio album by Ricky Van Shelton
- Released: April 28, 1992
- Recorded: 1991–2 at The Doghouse and Nightingale, Nashville, TN
- Genres: Country, gospel
- Length: 35:52
- Label: Columbia Nashville/TriStar
- Producer: Steve Buckingham

Ricky Van Shelton chronology
| Backroads (1991) | Don't Overlook Salvation (1992) | Greatest Hits Plus (1992) |

Professional ratings
Review scores
| Source | Rating |
|---|---|
| Allmusic | 2/5 stars |

Don't Overlook Salvation is an album of gospel music by American country music singer Ricky Van Shelton. No singles were released from this album. Despite its lack of singles, the album was certified gold by the RIAA. On the inside of the cover is a painting by Ricky of Jesus rescuing a lamb.

== Track listing ==
1. "Don't Overlook Salvation" (John Bava) - 3:20
2. "To My Mansion in the Sky" (Jimmie Davis) - 2:42
3. "Family Bible" (Walt Breeland, Paul Buskirk, Claude Gray) - 3:24
4. "Holy (I Bowed on My Knees and Cried Holy)" (Davis) - 2:58
5. "Suppertime" (Ira Stanphill) - 4:48
6. "I Shall Not Be Moved" (arr. by Ricky Van Shelton) - 2:15
7. "Mansion Over the Hilltop" (Stanphill) - 3:06
8. "The Old Rugged Cross" (Traditional) - 5:29
9. "I Would Take Nothing for My Journey Now" (Davis, Charles Goodman) - 2:03
10. "I Saw a Man" (Arthur "Guitar Boogie" Smith) - 3:14
11. "Just as I Am/He Smiled as He Ran Out to Play" (Arr. by Ricky Van Shelton) - 2:49

== Personnel ==
As listed in liner notes

Main Musicians

- Victor Battista - upright bass
- Eddie Bayers - percussion
- Mark Casstevens - acoustic guitar, banjo
- Steve Gibson - electric guitar, mandolin
- Rob Hajacos - fiddle
- Roy Huskey, Jr. - upright bass
- Randy McCormick - piano, organ
- Farrell Morris - percussion
- Mark O'Connor - fiddle, mandolin
- Tom Robb - bass guitar
- Ricky Van Shelton - lead vocals

Background vocals by The Cumberland Boys. Additional background vocals on "The Old Rugged Cross" by Vicki Hampton and Donna McElroy.

Strings

Arranged by Kristin Wilkinson

- Grace Mihi Bahng - cello
- David Davidson - violin
- Christian Teal - violin
- Kristin Wilkinson - viola
