= Love and Honor (album) =

Studio album by Ricky Van Shelton
- Released: November 1, 1994
- Recorded: Westwood Studios
- Genre: Country
- Length: 34:23
- Label: Columbia Nashville/TriStar
- Producer: Blake Chancey; Paul Worley

Ricky Van Shelton chronology
A Bridge I Didn't Burn (1993)	Love and Honor (1994)	Making Plans (1998)

Professional ratings
Review scores
Source	Rating
Allmusic	link
Entertainment Weekly	(B) link

Love and Honor is the seventh studio album (ninth overall) by country music artist Ricky Van Shelton and his last album for Columbia Records. This is also his first album of his career not to be produced by Steve Buckingham. Two singles released from this album, "Wherever She Is", and "Lola's Love" charted outside the top 40. "Lola's Love" was originally recorded by Sawyer Brown and featured on their 1987 album, Somewhere in the Night. "Where the Tall Grass Grows" was originally recorded by George Jones on his 1991 album And Along Came Jones.

== Track listing ==
1. "Wherever She Is" (James House, John Jarrard) - 2:50
2. "Complicated" (Bill LaBounty, Pat McLaughlin) - 3:07
3. "Lola's Love" (Dennis Linde) - 3:09
4. "I Thought I'd Heard It All" (Deryl Dodd, Philip Douglas, Don Pfrimmer) - 3:40
5. "Then for Them" (Larry Boone, Will Robinson) - 3:03
6. "Baby, Take a Picture" (Carol Chase, Kathy Louvin, Russell Smith) - 2:25
7. "Love Without You" (Jeff Pearson, Charles Quillen) - 3:02
8. "Been There, Done That" (John Jarrard, Craig Wiseman) - 3:23
9. "Love and Honor" (Merle Haggard) - 3:05
10. "Where the Tall Grass Grows" (Randy Boudreaux, Kerry Kurt Phillips, Andy Spooner) - 3:22
11. "Thanks a Lot" (Eddie Miller, Don Sessions) - 3:17

== Release history ==
Year	Type	Label	Catalogue
1994	Cassette	Sony	66153
1994	CD	Sony	66153
1994	CD	Columbia	4776802
1995	CD	Columbia	474802

== Personnel ==
Musicians

- Tigar Bell - fiddle (10)
- Darin Favorite - electric guitar (10,11)
- Paul Franklin - steel guitar (1, 2, 4, 7), dobro (1, 2, 4, 7)
- Sonny Garrish - steel guitar (8,9)
- Kenny Greenberg - acoustic guitar (1,2,3,8), electric guitar (1,2,3,8)
- Rob Hajacos - fiddle (8,9)
- Owen Hale - drums (1,2,4-7)
- Tommy Hannum - steel guitar (10,11), acoustic guitar (10,11)
- Bruce Harrison - keyboards (10,11)
- George Honea - drums (10,11)
- Paul Leim - drums (3,8,9)
- Dennis Linde - acoustic guitar, special effects, clavinet (3)
- Charlie McCoy - harmonica (2)
- Terry McMillan - percussion (3,5)
- Larry Marrs - bass (1-9)
- Steve Nathan - piano (1,2,4-7)
- Hank Singer - fiddle (1,6)
- Ricky Van Shelton - lead vocals (all tracks)
- Gary Smith - piano (8,9)
- Tommy Sprulock - steel guitar (5,6)
- Rocky Thacker - bass (10,11)
- Biff Watson - acoustic guitar (1,2,4-7)
- John Willis - electric guitar (1,4-9), mandolin (1,4-9)
- Paul Worley - acoustic guitar (1,2,5,8,10)

Background Vocals

- Larry Marrs (all tracks)
- Russell Terrell (1,4-11)
- Harry Stinson (2)
- Tony King (3)
- Tom Flora (3)
- Bergen White (3)

Production

- Production Assistant: Carl Landers
- Recorded and Mixed By: Chuck Ainlay & Graham Lewis
- Engineers: Tim Farmer, Mark Frigo & Graham Lewis
- Mastered By: Denny Purcell
- Art Direction: Bill Johnson
- Photography: Frank Ockenfels
- Design: Beth Kindig
- Art Assistance: Gregory MacLachlan

== Chart performance ==
Chart (1994)	Peak position
U.S. Billboard Top Country Albums	62
