= You've Got a Friend (Susie Luchsinger album) =

Studio album by Susie Luchsinger
- Released: 2003
- Genre: Gospel
- Label: New Haven
- Producer: Various

Susie Luchsinger chronology
My Gospel Hymnal (2001)	You've Got a Friend (2003)	Count It All Joy (2005)

You've Got a Friend is the eighth album from American gospel music artist Susie Luchsinger. It was released on 2003 on New Haven Records.

== Track listing ==
1. "Wonderful, Merciful Savior" - 4:01
2. "Have I Told You Lately" (Van Morrison)
3. "How Sweet It Is" (Holland-Dozier-Holland) - 3:32
4. "You've Got a Friend" (Carole King)
5. "Lean on Me" (Bill Withers)
6. "The Little Girl"
7. "There Is a Fountain" (William Cowper)
8. "I Can See Clearly"
9. "Shower the People You Love"
10. "Two Sparrows in a Hurricane"
11. "Celebrate"
