= A Bridge I Didn't Burn =

Studio album by Ricky Van Shelton
- Released: August 24, 1993
- Recorded: Nightingale Recording; The Doghouse; Sound Emporium (Nashville, Tennessee)
- Genre: Country
- Length: 36:26
- Label: Columbia Nashville/TriStar
- Producer: Steve Buckingham; Ricky Van Shelton

Ricky Van Shelton chronology
Greatest Hits Plus (1992)	A Bridge I Didn't Burn (1993)	Love and Honor (1994)

Singles from Greatest Hits Plus
- 1. "A Couple of Good Years Left" Released: July 1993; 2. "Where Was I" Released: January 10, 1994

Professional ratings
Review scores
Source	Rating
Allmusic	link
Entertainment Weekly	(B) link

A Bridge I Didn't Burn is the sixth studio album by American country music artist Ricky Van Shelton. The tracks "A Couple of Good Years Left" and "Where Was I" were released as singles. The first failed to reach the top 40 while the latter peaked at number 20 on the charts.

"Heartache Big As Texas" was originally released in 1991 on a promotional single (CSK 4062) as an extended dance mix. "Linda Lu" is a cover of R&B Artist Ray Sharpe's hit from 1959.

== Track listing ==
No.	Title	Writer(s)	Length
1.	"If They Turn Off Our Lights"	Bobby Braddock	3:06
2.	"A Bridge I Didn't Burn"	Tracy Byrd, Frank Dycus, Billy Yates	3:30
3.	"My First Reaction"	Sonny Throckmorton	3:00
4.	"Where Was I"	Harry Stinson, Gary Burr	3:11
5.	"A Couple of Good Years Left"	Burr	3:35)
6.	"I Know the Way by Broken Heart"	Ronnie Samoset, Craig Wiseman	2:53
7.	"Talking to God"	Lewis Anderson, Layng Martine Jr.	2:58
8.	"Heartache Big as Texas"	L. David Lewis, Royce Porter	2:54
9.	"If It Weren't for Me"	Roger Brown, David Stephenson	3:41
10.	"Linda Lu"	Ray Sharpe	3:40
11.	"Roses After the Rain"	Billy Burnette, Brian Tabor	3:58

== Release history ==
Year	Type	Label	Catalogue
1993	Cassette	Columbia	CT-48992
1993	CD	Columbia	CK-48992

== Personnel ==
Musicians

- Victor Battista – Double Bass
- Eddie Bayers – Drums
- Barry Beckett – Piano
- Mark Casstevens – Acoustic Guitar
- Jerry Douglas – Dobro
- Paul Franklin – Steel guitar, Pedabro
- Sonny Garrish – Steel Guitar
- Steve Gibson – Electric guitar, Mandolin
- Rob Hajacos – Fiddle
- Jim Horn – Saxophone
- Roy Huskey – Double Bass
- Bill Lloyd – Electric guitar
- Randy McCormick – Piano
- Terry McMillan – Harmonica
- Brent Mason – Electric guitar
- Gary Nicholson – Electric guitar
- Mark O'Connor – Fiddle
- Don Potter – Acoustic guitar
- Tom Robb – Bass Guitar
- Ricky Van Shelton – Acoustic Guitar, Lead Vocals
- Tommy Wells – Drums

Background Vocals

- Gary Burr
- Harry Stinson
- John Wesley Ryles
- Dennis Wilson
- Billy Yates

Production

- Chief Engineers
  - Marshall Morgan
  - Gary Laney
  - Toby Seay
  - Joe Bogan
- Assistant Engineers: Ken Hutton & John Kunz
- Mastered By: Denny Purcell
- Art Direction: Bill Johnson & Rollow Welch
- Photography: Mark Hanauer & Terry Calonge (Cover)
- Cover Art: Jeff Wack & Steve Flatt

== Chart performance ==
Chart (1993)	Peak position
U.S. Billboard Top Country Albums	17
U.S. Billboard 200	91

== Sources ==
- Allmusic (See Reviews in infobox)
- Liner Notes: “A Bridge I Didn't Burn.” Ricky Van Shelton. Columbia, 1993.
