= Making Plans =

Studio album by Ricky Van Shelton
- Released: October 27, 1998
- Genre: Country
- Length: 35:42
- Label: Vanguard
- Producer: Steve Buckingham

Ricky Van Shelton chronology
Love and Honor (1995)	Making Plans (1998)	Fried Green Tomatoes (2001)

Professional ratings
Review scores
Source	Rating
Allmusic	link

Making Plans is the eighth studio album by country music artist Ricky Van Shelton. This album was released exclusively through Wal-Mart, so it was unable to chart and no singles were released. This was Van Shelton's only release under the Vanguard label.

== Track listing ==
1. ”Just Say Goodbye” (Joe Chambers, Byron Hill) – 2:11
2. ”When the Feeling Goes Away” (Merle Haggard) – 2:59
3. ”She Needs Me” (Chuck Cannon, Jimmy Stewart) – 3:15
4. ”Borrowed Angel” (Mel Street) – 3:11
5. ”I Wish You Were More Like Your Memory” (Joe Chambers) – 3:00
6. ”Tic Toc” (Brett Beavers, Troy Johnson) – 2:53
7. ”It Wouldn't Kill Me” (Larry Boone, Paul Nelson, Tom Shapiro) – 3:05
8. ”Making Plans” (Voni Morrison, Johnny Russell) – 2:14
9. ”He's Not the Man I Used to Be” (Gary Duffey, Micki Foster) – 3:35
10. “Our Love” (Deana Cox, Mike Geiger, Woody Mullis) – 2:59
11. ”The Best Thing Goin'” (Geiger, Michael Huffman, Mullis) – 3:16
12. ”The Best Is Yet to Come” (Colleen Peterson, Cyril Lawson, Nancy Simmonds) – 3:06

== Personnel ==
- Victor Battista - upright bass
- Eddie Bayers - drums
- Paul Franklin - steel guitar
- Sonny Garrish - steel guitar
- Steve Gibson - electric guitar, mandolin
- Roy Huskey Jr. - upright bass
- Liana Manis - background vocals
- Tom Robb - bass guitar
- Hargus "Pig" Robbins - piano, Wurlitzer
- Matt Rollings - Hammond organ, piano, Wurlitzer
- John Wesley Ryles - background vocals
- Ricky Van Shelton - lead vocals
- Joe Spivey - fiddle
- Bruce Watkins - acoustic guitar
- Dennis Wilson - background vocals
