= Matthews, Wright & King =

American country band

- Raymond Matthews, Woody Wright, and Tony King

Background information
- Origin: United States
- Genres: Country
- Years active: 1991–1993
- Label: Columbia
- Past members: Raymond Matthews; Woody Wright; Tony King

Matthews, Wright & King was an American country music group formed in 1991. The band, Raymond Matthews (born October 13, 1956), Woody Wright (born October 10, 1957) and Tony King (born June 27, 1957), was put together by Columbia Records producer Larry Strickland after Shenandoah left the label, as an attempt to keep a viable country band on that label. Wright had previously been in another band called Memphis.

Though they enjoyed video success on CMT and TNN as well as touring with Reba McEntire for two seasons, their highest charting radio single, "The Power of Love," peaked at No. 41 on the Billboard Hot Country Singles & Tracks chart in 1992. It was the title track of their debut album, issued that same year on Columbia Records. The trio dissolved shortly after the release of their second album, Dream Seekers.

Since disbanding, Tony King joined Brooks & Dunn's backing band and was also briefly engaged to Wynonna Judd, Woody Wright found success as a gospel songwriter, producer and solo artist, while Raymond Matthews returned to his native Alabama and a successful contracting business.

In 2013, Raymond Matthews and his daughter, Ashley Matthews Mobley, released an album entitled Come Home. The album is a compilation of gospel songs written by Raymond. Production and recording took place at Dugger Mountain Music Hall near Heflin, Alabama.

== Discography ==
=== Power of Love ===
Power of Love

Studio album by Matthews, Wright & King
- Released: May 5, 1992
- Studio: The Doghouse & Nightingale
- Genre: Country
- Length: 30:41
- Label: Columbia Records
- Producer: Steve Buckingham; Larry Strickland

Matthews, Wright & King chronology
Power of Love (1992)	Dream Seekers (1993)

Professional ratings
Review scores
Source	Rating
AllMusic	4/5 stars

No.	Title	Writer(s)	Length
1.	"The Power of Love"	Walt Aldridge	2:50
2.	"For a Moment There"	Mike McGuire; Billy Henderson; Billy Maddox	3:15
3.	"You Found a Way"	Gary Burr; Harry Stinson	2:31
4.	"Someone's Child"	Billy Troy; Lee Bach	3:07
5.	"Standing in the River (Dying of Thirst)"	Russell Smith; John Jarrard	3:17
6.	"Mother's Eyes"	Karen Staley; Gary Harrison	3:27
7.	"When the River Runs High"	Robert Ellis Orrall; Charles Quillen	2:27
8.	"Leavin' Reasons"	Craig Wiseman; Kent Robbins	3:18
9.	"House Huntin'"	Bob DiPiero; Mark D. Sanders; John Jarrard	3:01
10.	"Everytime She Says Yes"	Jeff Silbar; Jan Buckingham	3:28
Total length:			30:41

==== Musicians ====
- Raymond Matthews – Vocals
- Woody Wright – Vocals
- Tony King – Vocals
- Eddie Bayers – Drums
- Willie Weeks – Bass
- Tom Robb – Bass
- Steve Gibson – Guitar
- Bill Watson – Bass
- Mark Casstevens – Guitar

==== Production ====
- Marshall Morgan – Engineer
- Toby Seay – Assistant Engineer
- John Kunz – Assistant Engineer
- Denny Purcell – Mastering
- Carlos Grier – Editing
- Bill Johnson – Art Direction
- Rollow Welch – Design
- Randee Saint Nicholas – Photography

=== Dream Seekers ===
Dream Seekers

Studio album by Matthews, Wright & King
- Released: July 20, 1993
- Studio: Scruggs Sound (Berry Hill, Tennessee)
- Genre: Country
- Length: 35:35
- Label: Columbia Records
- Producer: Randy Scruggs

Matthews, Wright & King chronology
Power of Love (1992)	Dream Seekers (1993)

Professional ratings
Review scores
Source	Rating
AllMusic	3/5 stars

No.	Title	Writer(s)	Length
1.	"One of These Days"	Billy Livsey; Don Schlitz	3:47
2.	"Every Step of the Way"	Richard Leigh; Gary Scruggs	3:32
3.	"I Got a Love"	Jackson Leap	3:29
4.	"She's Letting Go"	Charlie Craig; Gene Nelson	3:26
5.	"Don't Forget About Me"	Raymond Matthews; Mel Besher; Lee Buch	3:11
6.	"Plain Jane"	Gary Scruggs; J. Fred Knobloch	3:22
7.	"The Truth Is Killin' Me"	Raymond Matthews	3:31
8.	"Uncle Sam's Right Hand Man"	Raymond Matthews	3:43
9.	"Dream Seeker"	Raymond Matthews	3:17
10.	"Big Money"	Jim Robinson; Andy Byrd	4:17
Total length:			35:35

==== Musicians ====
- Eddie Bayers – Drums
- Willie Weeks – Bass
- Michael Rhodes – Bass
- Brent Mason – Electric Guitars
- Randy Scruggs – Electric Guitars
- Don Potter - Acoustic Guitar
- Paul Franklin - Steel Guitar
- Matt Rollings - Piano, Synth
- Steve Nathan - Organ, Synth
- Ron Reynolds - Percussion

==== Production ====
- Ron Reynolds – Engineer
- Glenn Meadows – Digital Editing, Mastering
- Bill Johnson – Art Direction
- Rollow Welch – Design
- Jodi Lynn Miller – Design Assistant
- Peter Nash – Photography

Track information and credits verified from Discogs, AllMusic, and the album's liner notes.

== Charts ==
=== Singles ===
Year	Single	Peak chart positions		Album
Year	Single	US Country	CAN Country	Album
1992	"The Power of Love"	41	45	Power of Love
1992	"Mother's Eyes"	55	76	Power of Love
1992	"House Huntin'"	68	—	Power of Love
1993	"I Got a Love"	45	75	Dream Seekers
1993	"One of These Days"	74	63	Dream Seekers
"—" denotes releases that did not chart

=== Music videos ===
Year	Video	Director
1992	"The Power of Love"	Michael Merriman
1992	"Mother's Eyes"	Michael Merriman
1993	"I Got a Love"	Michael Merriman
1993	"One of These Days"	Michael Merriman

== Awards and nominations ==
Year	Organization	Award	Nominee/Work	Result
1993	TNN/Music City News Country Awards	Vocal Group of the Year	Matthews, Wright & King	Nominated
1994	TNN/Music City News Country Awards	Vocal Group of the Year	Matthews, Wright & King	Nominated
