= Fried Green Tomatoes (Ricky Van Shelton album) =

Studio album by Ricky Van Shelton
- Released: May 23, 2000
- Genre: Country
- Length: 42:14
- Label: Audium
- Producer: Steve Gibson; "The Decision" co-produced by Ricky Van Shelton

Ricky Van Shelton chronology
16 Biggest Hits (1999)	Fried Green Tomatoes (2000)	Blue Christmas (2000)

Fried Green Tomatoes is the ninth and final studio album by country music artist Ricky Van Shelton. Of the two singles released, "The Decision" charted at number 71 while "Call Me Crazy" failed to chart. This was his only release for the Audium label. "All I Have to Offer You Is Me" is a cover of a Charley Pride single. "I'm the One" was previously recorded by McBride & the Ride on their 1992 album Sacred Ground, which also includes a cover of "All I Have to Offer You Is Me".

Professional ratings
Review scores
Source	Rating
Allmusic	link

== Track listing ==
1. "Call Me Crazy" (Brett Jones, Wendell Mobley) - 3:19
2. "Foolish Pride" (Ernie Rowell, Mel Tillis, Jr.) - 3:37
3. "I'm the One" (Terry McBride, Gary Nicholson) - 3:54
4. "Somebody's Gonna Lose" (Larry Butler, Mark Sherrill) - 3:50
5. "I Think I Like It Here" (Tom Shapiro, Chris Waters, Jimmy Yeary) - 3:18
6. "You Go Your Way (And I'll Go Crazy)" (Joe Chambers, Bucky Jones) - 3:41
7. "Who's Laughin' Now" (Tom Littlefield, Rick Rowell, Mel Tillis Jr.) - 3:00
8. "All I Have to Offer You Is Me" (Dallas Frazier, A.L. "Doodle" Owens) - 3:21
9. "From the Fryin' Pan" (Monty Criswell, Sam Gay) - 3:08
10. "I Was Losing You" (Bruce Burch) - 3:21
11. "Your One and Only" (Hillary Kanter, Even Stevens) - 2:59
12. "The Decision" (Jerry Thompson, Ricky Van Shelton) - 4:46

== Personnel ==
From Fried Green Tomatoes liner notes.

Musicians

- Pat Coil - keyboards
- Larry Franklin - fiddle, mandolin, acoustic guitar
- Shannon Forrest - drums
- Steve Gibson - acoustic guitar, electric guitar, background vocals
- Wes Hightower - background vocals
- John Hobbs - piano, keyboards
- B. James Lowry - acoustic guitar
- Liana Manis - background vocals
- Brent Mason - electric guitar
- Terry McMillan - harmonica
- Larry Paxton - bass guitar
- John Wesley Ryles - background vocals

Technical

- Steve Gibson - production, engineering
- Alan Schulman - engineering, mixing
- Ricky Van Shelton - production ("The Decision" only)
- Steve Tvweit - engineering
