= I Am a Simple Man =

Single by Ricky Van Shelton

from the album Backroads
- B-side: "Backroads"
- Released: April 8, 1991
- Recorded: December 20, 1990
- Genre: Country
- Length: 3:26
- Label: Columbia Nashville
- Songwriter: Walt Aldridge
- Producer: Steve Buckingham

Ricky Van Shelton singles chronology
"Rockin' Years" (1991)	"I Am a Simple Man" (1991)	"Keep It Between the Lines" (1991)

"I Am a Simple Man" is a song written by Walt Aldridge, and recorded by American country music artist Ricky Van Shelton. It was released in April 1991 as the first single from his album Backroads. The song was Ricky Van Shelton's 9th number 1 hit on the Billboard Hot Country Singles & Tracks (now Hot Country Songs) chart.

== Content ==
The narrator's spouse/girlfriend confronts him after a long, tiring day at work, wanting to start an argument by telling him he's hard to understand.

The narrator doesn't want a fight, and responds by telling her he's not hard to understand at all – so long as he has "a job and a piece of land/three squares [three meals] in my frying pan" he's very easy to please.

== Chart performance ==
"I Am a Simple Man" reached number 1 on the Billboard Hot Country Songs chart and on The Canadian RPM Country Tracks chart.

Chart (1991)	Peak position
Canada Country Singles (RPM)	1
US Hot Country Songs (Billboard)	1

=== Year-end charts ===
Chart (1991)	Position
Canada Country Tracks (RPM)	25
US Country Songs (Billboard)	19
