= Ricky Van Shelton Sings Christmas =

Studio album by Ricky Van Shelton
- Released: July 20, 1989
- Genre: Country, Christmas
- Length: 30:47
- Label: Columbia Nashville
- Producer: Steve Buckingham

Ricky Van Shelton chronology
Loving Proof (1988)	Ricky Van Shelton Sings Christmas (1989)	RVS III (1990)

Professional ratings
Review scores
Source	Rating
AllMusic	3/5 stars

Ricky Van Shelton Sings Christmas is the first holiday album by country music artist Ricky Van Shelton. The album includes versions of traditional and popular Christmas songs, along with two older country Christmas songs, Willie Nelson's "Pretty Paper" and Eddy Arnold's "C-H-R-I-S-T-M-A-S". It also includes two original songs, "Country Christmas", and "Christmas Long Ago".

== Track listing ==
1. "I'll Be Home for Christmas" (Kim Gannon, Walter Kent, Buck Ram) – 3:06
2. "White Christmas" (Irving Berlin) – 3:19
3. "Santa Claus Is Coming to Town" (J. Fred Coots, Haven Gillespie) – 1:52
4. "Silver Bells" (Ray Evans, Jay Livingston) – 3:09
5. "Silent Night" (Franz Xaver Gruber, Joseph Mohr) – 2:20
6. "C-H-R-I-S-T-M-A-S" (Eddy Arnold, Jenny Lou Carson) – 2:49
7. "Please Come Home for Christmas" (Charles Brown, Gene Redd) – 2:33
8. "Pretty Paper" (Willie Nelson) – 2:48
9. "Country Christmas" (Don Schlitz, Ricky Van Shelton) – 2:35
10. "Christmas Long Ago" (Schlitz, Van Shelton) – 3:09
11. "What Child Is This? (Greensleeves)" (William Chatterton Dix, Traditional) – 3:07

== Personnel ==
- Eddie Bayers – drums
- George Binkley III – violin
- Mark Casstevens – acoustic guitar
- Roy Christensen – cello
- Al DeLory – piano
- Conni Ellisor – violin
- Paul Franklin – steel guitar
- Steve Gibson – electric guitar, mandolin
- Carl Gorodetzky – violin
- Roy Huskey Jr. – upright bass
- Ted Madsen – violin
- Randy McCormick – piano
- Dennis Molchan – violin
- Craig Nelson – upright bass
- Louis Dean Nunley – background vocals
- Mark O'Connor – fiddle, mandolin
- Tom Robb – bass guitar
- John Wesley Ryles – background vocals
- Pamela Sixfin – violin
- Ricky Van Shelton – acoustic guitar, lead vocals
- Gary Vanosdale – violin
- Kristin Wilkinson – violin
- Dennis Wilson – background vocals
- Curtis Young – background vocals
- Additional background vocals by "5th Avenue".

== Chart performance ==
Chart (1989)	Peak position
U.S. Billboard Top Country Albums	32
