= Rockin' Years =

Single by Dolly Parton and Ricky Van Shelton

from the album Eagle When She Flies and Backroads
- B-side: "What a Heartache"
- Released: February 4, 1991
- Recorded: November 8, 1990
- Genre: Country
- Length: 3:25
- Label: Columbia/TriStar
- Songwriter: Floyd Parton
- Producers: Steve Buckingham, Gary Smith, Dolly Parton

Dolly Parton singles chronology
| "Take Me Back to the Country" (1990) | "Rockin' Years" (1991) | "Silver and Gold" (1991) |

Ricky Van Shelton singles chronology
| "Life's Little Ups and Downs" (1990) | "Rockin' Years" (1991) | "I Am a Simple Man" (1991) |

"Rockin' Years" is a song written by Floyd Parton, and recorded as a duet by American country music artists Dolly Parton and Ricky Van Shelton. It was released in February 1991 as the lead-off single to both Parton's album Eagle When She Flies and Shelton's album Backroads, and it is track #2 on each of the albums track lists. The song reached the top of the Billboard Hot Country Singles & Tracks (now Hot Country Songs) chart, giving Parton her twenty-fourth number one and Shelton his eighth. The song would be Parton's last chart-topper until 2006.

== Content ==
The song is a mid-tempo country waltz in which two narrators — a male and a female — promise to love each other until their "rockin' years"; i.e., when they are old and sitting in rocking chairs together.

== Chart performance ==
| Chart (1991) | Peak position |
|---|---|
| Canada Country Singles (RPM) | 1 |
| US Hot Country Songs (Billboard) | 1 |

=== Year-end charts ===
| Chart (1991) | Position |
|---|---|
| Canada Country Tracks (RPM) | 33 |
| US Country Songs (Billboard) | 29 |

== Other recorded versions ==
An unreleased duet between George Jones and Parton was recorded in 1988 but remained unreleased until the release of his 2008 album Burn Your Playhouse Down.
