= Backroads (album) =

Studio album by Ricky Van Shelton
- Released: May 21, 1991
- Recorded: November–December 1990
- Studio: Nightingale Studio; The Doghouse
- Genre: Country
- Length: 33:01
- Label: Columbia Nashville/TriStar
- Producer: Steve Buckingham (all tracks), Gary Smith (track 2)

Ricky Van Shelton chronology
RVS III (1990)	Backroads (1991)	Don't Overlook Salvation (1992)

Singles from Backroads
- 1. "Rockin' Years" Released: February 4, 1991; 2. "I Am a Simple Man" Released: April 8, 1991; 3. "Keep It Between the Lines" Released: July 11, 1991; 4. "After the Lights Go Out" Released: November 1991; 5. "Backroads" Released: March 16, 1992

Professional ratings
Review scores
Source	Rating
AllMusic	4.5/5 stars
Entertainment Weekly -	B+

Backroads is the fifth studio album by American country music artist Ricky Van Shelton. The first three singles released from the album, "Rockin' Years" (a duet with Dolly Parton), "I Am a Simple Man", and "Keep It Between the Lines" were all number-one hits. "After the Lights Go Out" and "Backroads" charted at numbers 13 and 2, respectively. The album was certified platinum by the RIAA on December 6, 1991.

== Track listing ==
No.	Title	Writer(s)	Length
1.	"I Am a Simple Man"	Walt Aldridge	3:26
2.	"Rockin' Years" (duet with Dolly Parton)	Floyd Parton	3:25
3.	"Oh Heart of Mine"	Allen Shamblin, Bernie Nelson	3:19
4.	"Some Things Are Better Left Alone"	Roger Murrah, Larry Shell	3:07
5.	"After the Lights Go Out"	Warner McPherson	3:19
6.	"Call Me Up"	Josh Leo, Harry Stinson	2:48
7.	"If You're Ever in My Arms"	Bobby Braddock	3:30
8.	"Who'll Turn Out the Lights"	Wayne Kemp, Mack Vickery	2:42
9.	"Backroads"	Charlie Major	3:42
10.	"Keep It Between the Lines"	Russell Smith, Kathy Louvin	3:48

== Personnel ==
Musicians

- Eddie Bayers - drums
- Mark Casstevens - acoustic guitar
- Richard Dennison - background vocals
- Jerry Douglas - dobro
- Glen Duncan - fiddle
- Paul Franklin - steel guitar
- Sonny Garrish - steel guitar
- Steve Gibson - electric guitar, mandolin
- Rob Hajacos - fiddle
- Roy Huskey Jr. - upright bass
- Carl Jackson - background vocals
- Albert Lee - electric guitar
- Randy McCormick - piano
- Terry McMillan - harmonica
- Jimmy Mattingly - fiddle
- Louis Dean Nunley - background vocals
- Jennifer O'Brien - background vocals
- Mark O'Connor - fiddle
- Dolly Parton - duet vocals on "Rockin' Years"
- Matt Rollings - piano
- Hal Rugg - steel guitar
- John Wesley Ryles - background vocals
- Randy Scruggs - acoustic guitar
- Ricky Van Shelton - acoustic guitar, lead vocals
- Howard Smith - background vocals
- Harry Stinson - background vocals
- Steve Turner - drums
- Paul Uhrig - bass guitar
- Bruce Watkins - acoustic guitar
- Biff Watson - acoustic guitar
- Dennis Wilson - background vocals
- Curtis Young - background vocals

Production

Compiled from liner notes.

- Steve Buckingham — production
- Marshall Morgan — engineering (except "Rockin' Years")
- Gary Paczosa — engineering ("Rockin' Years" only)
- Denny Purcell — mastering
- Gary Smith — production ("Rockin' Years" only)

== Charts ==
=== Weekly charts ===
Chart (1991)	Peak position
Canadian Albums (RPM)	84
Canadian Country Albums (RPM)	4
US Billboard 200	23
US Top Country Albums (Billboard)	3

=== Year-end charts ===
Chart (1991)	Position
US Billboard 200	74
US Top Country Albums (Billboard)	22
