= Keep It Between the Lines =

Single by Ricky Van Shelton

from the album Backroads
- B-side: "Weekend World"
- Released: July 11, 1991
- Recorded: December 20, 1990
- Genre: Country
- Length: 3:48
- Label: Columbia Nashville(38-73956)
- Songwriters: Russell Smith; Kathy Louvin
- Producer: Steve Buckingham

Ricky Van Shelton singles chronology
"I Am a Simple Man" (1991)	"Keep It Between the Lines" (1991)	"After the Lights Go Out" (1991)

"Keep It Between the Lines" is a song written by Russell Smith and Kathy Louvin, and recorded by American country music singer Ricky Van Shelton. It was released in July 1991 as the second single from his fourth studio album Backroads, and was the tenth and final No. 1 single of his career.

== Music video ==
The music video was directed and produced by Deaton Flanigen and premiered in mid-1991.

== Chart positions ==
Chart (1991)	Peak position
Canada Country Singles (RPM)	1
US Hot Country Songs (Billboard)	1

=== Year-end charts ===
Chart (1991)	Position
Canada Country Tracks (RPM)	26
US Country Songs (Billboard)	55
