= Susie McEntire =

American Christian music singer

Susie McEntire-Eaton
- Also known as: Susie Luchsinger (1981–2008)
- Born: Martha Susan McEntire; November 8, 1957 (age 68); Chockie, Oklahoma, U.S.
- Genres: Christian; country
- Years active: 1981–present
- Spouses: Paul Luchsinger (m. 1981; div. 2008) Mark Eaton (m. 2009)
- Website: susiemcentire.com

Martha Susan McEntire-Eaton (formerly Luchsinger, née McEntire; born November 8, 1957) is an American contemporary Christian music singer. She is the younger sister of Reba, Alice, and Pake. She used her married name of Susie Luchsinger on her solo albums until her divorce in 2008.

== Early life ==
Martha Susan McEntire was born to Jacqueline "Jackie" (née Smith; 1926–2020) and Clark Vincent McEntire (1927–2014) in Chockie, Oklahoma, where she was raised. She attended Oklahoma State University.

== Career ==
She toured with sister Reba McEntire in the 1980s, in addition to singing on the albums Heart to Heart (1981) and Unlimited (1982).

In 1993, she released her album Real Love, scoring several hits on Christian country radio. The album hit #39 on the U.S. Billboard Top Contemporary Christian Albums chart in 1994. Several further solo albums followed in the 1990s and 2000s. McEntire-Eaton was inducted into the Christian Music Hall of Fame on November 5, 2011. She was also inducted into the Oklahoma Music Hall of Fame in December 2018.

== Personal life ==
McEntire married rodeo cowboy Earl Paul Luchsinger (1955–2015) on November 27, 1981, and divorced him on May 19, 2008. The couple had three children. On December 12, 2009, she remarried to American theologian, climber and public speaker Mark Eaton, of Seattle, Washington. She holds many awards in the field of positive country and as co-host of the Cowboy Church TV show. The Eatons reside in Stringtown, Oklahoma.

== Discography ==
=== Albums ===
Year	Album	US Christian	Label
1988	First Things First		Psalms Ministries
1989	God's Still In Control		Psalms Ministries
1990	No Limit		Psalms Ministries
1990	Christmas Everyday		Psalms Ministries
1993	Real Love	39	Integrity Music
1995	Come As You Are		REP
1996	Inspirational Favorites		K-Tel Records
1999	Raised on Faith		New Haven
2001	My Gospel Hymnal		New Haven
2004	You've Got a Friend		New Haven
2005	Count It All Joy		New Haven
2008	Let Go		SLM
2009	I'll Be Home For Christmas		SLM
2010	Passages		SM
2012	Chase the Wind		SM

=== Singles ===
Year	Title	Album
1993	"I Don't Love You Like I Used To" (with Paul Overstreet)	Real Love
1994	"For Pete's Sake"	Real Love
1995	"Love Will Carry the Load"	Come as You Are
