= Darryl & Don Ellis =

American country music duo

Background information
- Origin: Beaver Falls, Pennsylvania, United States
- Genres: Country
- Years active: 1992–1994
- Label: Epic
- Past members: Darryl Ellis Gatlin; Don Ellis Gatlin

Darryl & Don Ellis were an American country music duo formed in Beaver Falls, Pennsylvania in 1992. The duo consisted of brothers Darryl Ellis Gatlin and Don Ellis Gatlin. Their highest charting single, "No Sir," peaked at No. 58 on the Billboard Hot Country Singles & Tracks chart in 1992. Don Ellis wrote songs on Blake Shelton's first two albums, and later founded a second band called Savannah Jack.

In the 2020s, Don began touring with Kenny Rogers's road band as part of a tribute to Rogers.

== Discography ==
=== Albums ===
Title	Album details	Peak chart positions	
Title	Album details	US Country	US Heat
No Sir	Release date: September 22, 1992; Label: Epic Records	57	21
Day in the Sun	Release date: August 24, 1993; Label: Epic Records	—	—
"—" denotes releases that did not chart

=== Singles ===
Year	Single	Peak chart positions		Album
Year	Single	US Country	CAN Country	Album
1992	"Goodbye Highway"	70	—	No Sir
1992	"No Sir"	58	77	No Sir
1992	"Something Moving in Me"	73	—	No Sir
1993	"10 Minutes Till"	—	—	Day in the Sun
1993	"Walk Out of My Mind"	—	—	Day in the Sun
"—" denotes releases that did not chart

=== Music videos ===
Year	Video	Director
1992	"Goodbye Highway"	
1992	"No Sir"	Michael Merriman
1993	"10 Minutes Till"	Michael Merriman

== Awards and nominations ==
Year	Organization	Award	Nominee/Work	Result
1993	TNN/Music City News Country Awards	Vocal Duo of the Year	Darryl & Don Ellis	Nominated
1993	Country Music Association Awards	Vocal Duo of the Year	Darryl & Don Ellis	Nominated
1994	Academy of Country Music Awards	Top Vocal Duo of the Year	Darryl & Don Ellis	Nominated
1995	TNN/Music City News Country Awards	Vocal Group or Duo of Tomorrow	Darryl & Don Ellis	Nominated
