= Mike Snider =

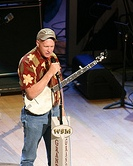
- Snider at the Grand Ole Opry in 2007

Background information
- Born: William Michael Snider; May 30, 1961 (age 64); Gleason, Tennessee, U.S.
- Genres: Old Time Mountain
- Occupations: Musician, humorist
- Instrument: Banjo
- Years active: 1977–present
- Label: Tater Town
- Website: themikesnider.com

Mike Snider (born May 30, 1961) is an American banjo player and humorist. He specialized in "old-time" mountain music which is a stylistic that can be traced back to the core beginnings of country music. He learned to play the banjo at the age of 16. Although he is well known for comedic routine, he is also a banjo player. Much of his comedy is based on stories about his wife, Sabrina, referred to as Sweetie.

== Musical career ==
In 1983, Snider won the National Banjo Championship at the Walnut Valley Festival in Winfield, Kansas. He was asked to appear on the Grand Ole Opry as a guest artist in 1984. On June 2, 1990, he was inducted as a member of the Opry by country comedian Minnie Pearl. He was a cast member on the variety show Hee Haw from 1990 to 1996. From 1991 to 1998, Snider performed at Opryland USA. Snider still performs regularly on the Grand Ole Opry.

== Personal life ==
Snider lives in Gleason, Tennessee. He was married to Sabrina Snider who died on April 24, 2024 at age 60. Snider has two children from the marriage, Katie Lynn and Blake.
