= Ricky Van Shelton =

American country music singer (born 1952)

- Born: January 12, 1952 (age 74); Danville, Virginia, U.S.
- Origin: Nashville, Tennessee, U.S.
- Genre: Country
- Occupation: Singer
- Instruments: Vocals, guitar
- Years active: 1986–2006
- Labels: Columbia; Vanguard; Audium; RVS

Ricky Van Shelton (born January 12, 1952) is an American retired country music singer. Active between 1986 and 2006, he charted more than 20 singles on the Billboard Hot Country Songs charts. This figure includes 10 number-one hits: "Somebody Lied", "Life Turned Her That Way", 'Don't We All Have the Right", "I'll Leave This World Loving You", "From a Jack to a King" (a cover of the Ned Miller hit), "Living Proof", "I've Cried My Last Tear for You", "Rockin' Years" (a duet with Dolly Parton), "I Am a Simple Man", and "Keep It Between the Lines". Besides these, seven more of his singles landed in the top 10 on the same chart. He also released nine studio albums, of which his first four were certified platinum by the Recording Industry Association of America.

== Early life ==
He was born at Danville Regional Medical Center in Danville, Virginia, United States, to Jenks and Eloise Shelton in 1952, but was raised in Grit, Virginia, and went to high school in Gretna, Virginia. Although "Van" (meaning "of" or "from") is a common portion of surnames derived from people of Dutch origin, "Van" in this case is Shelton's middle name. He started using his middle name to avoid confusion with another Ricky Shelton in Grit.

Shelton's father sang gospel music while he was still a child, and from this, Shelton also sang gospel, but he liked pop music as well. He was soon in church, singing gospel. When he was a teenager, however, Shelton discovered country music. He soon started singing country music in his brother's band and performed at any local gathering he could.

== Musical career ==
=== Move to Nashville ===
After he graduated from high school, Shelton started performing in area clubs and also worked a series of jobs. In 1984, Bettye Witt, his girlfriend at the time (and since August 4, 1986, wife) found a job in Nashville, Tennessee, and Shelton went along with her. In Nashville, Shelton tried to land a deal with a recording contract, and worked in area nightclubs. In 1986, Jerry Thompson, a newspaper columnist, heard one of Shelton's demonstration tapes, and arranged an audition with Columbia Records. Soon thereafter, Shelton was offered a recording contract with CBS, with Jerry Thompson serving as his manager. In that same year, he recorded his first album, Wild-Eyed Dream. The title track was released as a single, and reached number 24 on the country charts.

=== 1986–1988: Wild-Eyed Dream ===
Wild-Eyed Dream became successful for Shelton and his record label. The next song from the album, "Crime of Passion", gained him an even bigger hit on the country charts, when it reached the top 10 early that year. The follow-up was an even larger success. This next song was called "Somebody Lied", and in December 1987, it became his first number one on the Hot Country Singles & Tracks chart. Nine other songs made it to number one on the country charts during his career. He had a pair of other number-one singles from his debut album: "Life Turned Her That Way" and "Don't We All Have the Right". His album reached the highest spot on the Top Country Albums chart in 1987, was one of the largest-selling country albums of the year, and it made Shelton one of the most successful male vocalists of that year.

=== 1988–1989: Loving Proof ===
He achieved equal success the next year with a new album and a new single. The album was titled Loving Proof, and it was also a number-one Billboard country album. The album spawned three number-one hits for Shelton. These songs were "I'll Leave This World Loving You" (for two weeks in November 1988), "From a Jack to a King" (in March 1989), and "Living Proof" (in October 1989). "From a Jack to a King" was a remake of the original by Ned Miller. By this time in country music, neotraditionalism was in its peak, and because of this, so was Shelton's career, just like many of his counterparts, including Clint Black, Alan Jackson, George Strait, Randy Travis, Dwight Yoakam, Ricky Skaggs, The Judds, Patty Loveless and Garth Brooks.

=== 1989–1991: RVS III, Christmas album and children's books ===
His albums continued to win him praise and keep him high on the charts; his third album was no different. Titled RVS III, this album spawned only a number-one single, called "I've Cried My Last Tear For You". Although this was his only number one from the album, two singles came close, "Statue of a Fool" (originally recorded by Jack Greene) and "I Meant Every Word He Said", both of which reached number two on the country charts. By now in his career, Shelton was one of country music's most successful male vocalists. Each of his albums around this time had been certified by the RIAA as platinum, and were also all number-one albums on the Top Country Albums chart. In 1990, he recorded a Christmas album titled Ricky Van Shelton Sings Christmas.

Around the same time, Shelton wrote a series of children's books. The first two titles of his books were Tales From a Duck Named Quacker and Quacker Meets Mrs. Moo. The series also contains "Quacker Meets Canadian Goose" and were all illustrated by Shan Williams Burklow.

=== 1991–1992: Backroads ===
Shelton continued his success as the decade began to progress. 1991 proved to be another successful year for Shelton. He duetted on the song, "Rockin' Years" with Dolly Parton (which also went to number one), and a new album, titled, Backroads. The album featured his last number-one hits, along with a number-13 hit called "After the Lights Go Out". His hit streak continued until this year, and his album was just as successful as his songs.

=== 1992–1993: Greatest Hits Plus, Don't Overlook Salvation, and alcoholism ===
By 1992, Shelton's success on the country charts was tapering off, and like many others in the industry, he was swept out of popularity by the changes in country music that arrived in the early 1990s. He enjoyed one last top-10 hit (which actually reached number five) titled "Wild Man", that was put on his newest album, called Greatest Hits Plus. Another single, "Just as I Am", was featured on his Greatest Hits album, but it only made the top 30 that year. He also released a gospel music album titled Don't Overlook Salvation.

In 1992, Shelton admitted that he suffered from alcoholism and sought help to recover his sobriety.

=== 1993–1994: Love and Honor and departure from Columbia ===
By 1993, Shelton clearly was moving further and further away from the top 10 on the country charts. In 1994, he had his last top-40 hit with "Where Was I". After 1994's Love and Honor album, Shelton decided to leave Columbia Records.

After being under Columbia Records, Shelton was absent from the country chart for a long time. However, Columbia continued to release greatest-hits collections to the public. Shelton continued to work on other projects during this time, which did not mean giving up performing.

=== 1997–1999: Making Plans and label formation ===
In 1997, Shelton formed his own label, RVS Records. That same year, he released his first album in three years, Making Plans. Shelton financed the project himself, however, and worked out to release his album only to Walmart stores.

=== 2000–2001: Fried Green Tomatoes ===
In 2000, Shelton signed with the Audium label, where he made another album called Fried Green Tomatoes, which spawned his first single in over five years called "The Decision", but it failed to make a substantial impact on the country chart.

=== 2006–present: Retirement ===
In May 2006, Shelton announced that he would be retiring from touring to spend more time with his family. Since then, Shelton has effectively disappeared from public life, focusing, instead, on painting and writing children's books.

== Discography ==
Studio albums

- Wild-Eyed Dream (1987)
- Loving Proof (1988)
- RVS III (1990)
- Backroads (1991)
- Don't Overlook Salvation (1992)
- A Bridge I Didn't Burn (1993)
- Love and Honor (1994)
- Making Plans (1998)
- Fried Green Tomatoes (2000)

== Awards and nominations ==
=== Grammy Awards ===
Year	Nominee / work	Award	Result
1992	"Rockin' Years"^{[A]}	Best Country Collaboration with Vocals	Nominated

=== American Music Awards ===
Year	Nominee / work	Award	Result
1989	Wild-Eyed Dream	Favorite Country Album	Nominated
1992	Ricky Van Shelton	Favorite Country Male Artist	Nominated

=== Music City News Country Awards & TNN/Music City News Country Awards ===
Year	Nominee / work	Award	Result
1988	"Somebody Lied"	Single of the Year	Nominated
1988	Ricky Van Shelton	Star of Tomorrow	Won
1988	Ricky Van Shelton	Male Artist of the Year	Nominated
1989	Ricky Van Shelton	Male Artist of the Year	Won
1989	"I'll Leave This World Loving You"	Single of the Year	Won
1989	"I'll Leave This World Loving You"	Video of the Year	Won
1989	Loving Proof	Album of the Year	Won
1989	Ricky Van Shelton	Entertainer of the Year	Nominated
1990	"Living Proof"	Single of the Year	Nominated
1990	Ricky Van Shelton	Male Artist of the Year	Won
1990	Ricky Van Shelton	Entertainer of the Year	Won
1991	"I Meant Every Word He Said"	Single of the Year	Nominated
1991	"I Meant Every Word He Said"	Video of the Year	Nominated
1991	RVS III	Album of the Year	Nominated
1991	Ricky Van Shelton	Male Artist of the Year	Won
1991	Ricky Van Shelton	Entertainer of the Year	Won
1992	"Keep It Between the Lines"	Single of the Year	Nominated
1992	"Rockin' Years"^{[A]}	Video of the Year	Won
1992	Dolly Parton and Ricky Van Shelton	Vocal Collaboration of the Year	Won
1992	Backroads	Album of the Year	Nominated
1992	Ricky Van Shelton	Male Artist of the Year	Nominated
1992	Ricky Van Shelton	Entertainer of the Year	Nominated
1993	Ricky Van Shelton	Male Artist of the Year	Nominated
1994	Ricky Van Shelton	Male Artist of the Year	Nominated
1994	"A Couple of Good Years Left"	Video of the Year	Nominated
1994	A Bridge I Didn't Burn	Album of the Year	Nominated
1995	Love and Honor	Album of the Year	Nominated
1995	Ricky Van Shelton	Christian Country Artist of the Year	Won
1995	Ricky Van Shelton	Male Artist of the Year	Nominated
1995	Ricky Van Shelton	Entertainer of the Year	Nominated
1996	Ricky Van Shelton	Christian Country Artist of the Year	Won
1996	Ricky Van Shelton	Male Artist of the Year	Nominated
1997	Ricky Van Shelton	Christian Country Artist of the Year	Won
1998	Making Plans	Album of the Year	Nominated
1998	Ricky Van Shelton	Male Artist of the Year	Nominated

=== TNN Viewers' Choice Awards ===
Year	Nominee / work	Award	Result
1988	Ricky Van Shelton	Favorite Newcomer of the Year	Won
1988	"Somebody Lied"	Favorite Song of the Year	Nominated
1989	Ricky Van Shelton	Favorite Entertainer of the Year	Nominated
1989	Ricky Van Shelton	Favorite Male Vocalist of the Year	Won
1989	Loving Proof	Favorite Album of the Year	Nominated
1989	"I'll Leave This World Loving You"	Favorite Song of the Year	Won
1989	"I'll Leave This World Loving You"	Favorite Video of the Year	Won

=== Academy of Country Music Awards ===
Year	Nominee / work	Award	Result
1988	Ricky Van Shelton	Top New Male Vocalist	Won
1988	"Somebody Lied"	Song of the Year	Nominated
1988	"Somebody Lied"	Single Record of the Year	Nominated
1989	"I'll Leave This World Loving You"	Single Record of the Year	Nominated
1989	Loving Proof	Album of the Year	Nominated
1989	Ricky Van Shelton	Top Male Vocalist of the Year	Nominated
1990	Ricky Van Shelton	Top Male Vocalist of the Year	Nominated
1991	Ricky Van Shelton	Top Male Vocalist of the Year	Nominated
1991	RVS III	Album of the Year	Nominated
1992	Backroads	Album of the Year	Nominated
1992	Dolly Parton and Ricky Van Shelton	Top Vocal Duo of the Year	Nominated

=== Country Music Association Awards ===
Year	Nominee / work	Award	Result
1988	"Somebody Lied"	Single of the Year	Nominated
1988	Ricky Van Shelton	Horizon Award	Won
1988	Ricky Van Shelton	Male Vocalist of the Year	Nominated
1989	Ricky Van Shelton	Male Vocalist of the Year	Won
1989	"I'll Leave This World Loving You"	Single of the Year	Nominated
1989	Loving Proof	Album of the Year	Nominated
1989	Ricky Van Shelton	Entertainer of the Year	Nominated
1990	Ricky Van Shelton	Male Vocalist of the Year	Nominated
1990	RVS III	Album of the Year	Nominated
1990	Ricky Van Shelton	Entertainer of the Year	Nominated
1991	"Rockin' Years"^{[A]}	Vocal Event of the Year	Nominated

^[A]Nominated alongside Dolly Parton
