= CMT Music Awards =

Fan-voted awards show for country music videos

- Previous: 2024 CMT Music Awards
- Awarded for: Achievements in country music videos voted on by fans
- Location: Austin, Texas
- Country: United States
- Presented by: Various
- Formerly called: Music City News Awards
- First award: 1967 (as Music City News Awards)
- Final award: 2024
- Website: www.cmt.com/cmt-music-awards

Television/radio coverage
- Network: CBS; CMT

The CMT Music Awards was a fan-voted awards show for country music videos and television performances. The ceremony launched in 1967 as Music City News Awards; it is the oldest award show currently airing under Paramount Global. The ceremony originally aired on TNN, prior to its parent company's acquisition of former rival network Country Music Television in 1991. The show would then air on CMT from 2001 to 2021 and CBS from 2022 to 2024.

== History ==
=== Early history ===
Beginning in 1967, the Music City News Awards were presented yearly by the now–defunct Music City News magazine. In 1988, The Nashville Network (TNN) began a fan–voted awards show dubbed the Viewers' Choice Awards to help the network celebrate its fifth anniversary; two were broadcast in 1988 and 1989. In 1990, the two awards shows merged to become the TNN/Music City News Country Awards. TNN's contract with Music City News ended in 1999, and the magazine ceased publication shortly thereafter.

Country Weekly briefly became the presenting sponsor of the awards show in 2000, and the show was known as Country Weekly presents the TNN Music Awards.

=== 2001–2021 ===
In 2001, as TNN began to phase out its association with country music, the decision was made to shift the awards show to sister network CMT. The 2001 show, known as the TNN/CMT Country Weekly Music Awards, was simulcast on both networks.

When the show moved permanently to CMT, Country Weekly ended its brief association with the production. During this era, viewers voted for nominees by telephone or mail in traditional categories such as "Entertainer of the Year," "Male/Female Artist of the Year," "Song of the Year," etc. Most categories mirrored those at the CMA Awards and ACM Awards, except all were fan—voted.

The ceremony was completely retooled in 2002 as the CMT Flameworthy Video Music Awards, named for the network's branding concept at the time for its most popular videos. "Flameworthy" was coined by program development vice president Kaye Zusmann, and aimed to symbolize the waving of lighters or similar lights at concerts (this was before the current negative meaning of the word flaming from the Internet became more commonplace). The show became more production—based, rather than awards—based, and was modeled after sister network MTV's Video Music Awards. In the process, the traditional awards were shifted to specifically honor the music videos of country artists.

The show included several non—traditional categories highlighting especially funny, sexy, and patriotic videos; however, these categories were phased out over the years. It differentiated itself furthet from the CMA Awards and ACM Awards by showcasing bluegrass performers such as Alison Krauss and Earl Scruggs.

In 2003, the show was moved to April but returned to June in 2009 to coincide with the CMA Music Festival (the renamed "Fan Fair") and the influx of tourists to Nashville as well as capitalize on a time when many of the artists would already be in Nashville at once.

The show was renamed the CMT Music Awards in 2005.

In 2020, the awards were delayed until October due to the COVID-19 pandemic, with that year's CMA Fest not going forward. Initially planned for October 14, a scheduling conflict with that year's Billboard Music Awards caused the ceremony to be pushed back to October 21.

=== 2021–2025 ===
On June 28, 2021, ViacomCBS (now known as Paramount Global) announced that the ceremony would move to broadcast television on sister network CBS and shift to April beginning in 2022. CBS subsequently declined to renew its broadcast rights to the ACM Awards (which were also traditionally held in April), citing declining viewership in comparison to increased rights fees demanded by Dick Clark Productions.

In 2023, after over twenty years in Nashville, the CMT Music Awards were hosted for the first time at the Moody Center in Austin, Texas.

In February 2025, Bruce Gillmer of Paramount International Networks announced a one-year pause for a few selected events scheduled for 2025, including the CMT Music Awards, as Paramount seeks "to reimagine and optimize [our] events slate going forward".

== Major awards ==
Year	Video of the Year	Male Video of the Year	Female Video of the Year	Breakthrough Video of The Year	
2002	Kenny Chesney – "Young"	Kenny Chesney – "Young"	Martina McBride – "Blessed"	Chris Cagle – "I Breathe In, I Breathe Out"	
2003	Toby Keith – "Courtesy of the Red, White, & Blue (The Angry American)"	Toby Keith – "Courtesy of the Red, White, & Blue (The Angry American)"	Martina McBride – "Concrete Angel"	Joe Nichols – "Brokenheartsville"	
2004	Toby Keith – "American Soldier"	Kenny Chesney – "There Goes My Life"	Shania Twain – "Forever and for Always"	Dierks Bentley – "What Was I Thinkin'"	
2005	Keith Urban – "Days Go By"	Kenny Chesney – "I Go Back"	Gretchen Wilson – "When I Think About Cheatin'"	Gretchen Wilson – "Redneck Woman"	
2006	Keith Urban – "Better Life"	Kenny Chesney – "Who You'd Be Today"	Carrie Underwood – "Jesus, Take the Wheel"	Carrie Underwood – "Jesus, Take The Wheel"	
2007	Carrie Underwood – "Before He Cheats"	Kenny Chesney – "You Save Me"	Carrie Underwood – "Before He Cheats"	Taylor Swift – "Tim McGraw"	
2008	Taylor Swift – "Our Song"	Trace Adkins – "I Got My Game On"	Taylor Swift – "Our Song"	Kellie Pickler – "I Wonder"	
2009	Taylor Swift – "Love Story"	Brad Paisley – "Waitin' on a Woman"	Taylor Swift – "Love Story"	Zac Brown Band – "Chicken Fried"	
2010	Carrie Underwood – "Cowboy Casanova"	Keith Urban – "'Til Summer Comes Around"	Miranda Lambert – "White Liar"	Luke Bryan – "Do I"	
2011	Taylor Swift – "Mine"	Blake Shelton – "Who Are You When I'm Not Looking"	Miranda Lambert – "The House That Built Me"	The Band Perry – "If I Die Young"	
2012	Carrie Underwood – "Good Girl"	Luke Bryan – "I Don't Want This Night to End"	Miranda Lambert – "Over You"	Scotty McCreery – "The Trouble With Girls"	
2013	Carrie Underwood – "Blown Away"	Blake Shelton – "Sure Be Cool If You Did"	Miranda Lambert – "Mama's Broken Heart"	Florida Georgia Line – "Cruise"	
2014	Carrie Underwood – "See You Again"	Blake Shelton – "Doin' What She Likes"	Miranda Lambert – "Automatic"	Cassadee Pope – "Wasting All These Tears"	
2015	Carrie Underwood – "Something in the Water"	Luke Bryan – "Play It Again"	Carrie Underwood – "Something in the Water"	Sam Hunt – "Leave the Night On"	
2016	Tim McGraw – "Humble and Kind"	Thomas Rhett – "Die a Happy Man"	Carrie Underwood – "Smoke Break"	Chris Stapleton – "Fire Away"	
2017	Keith Urban – "Blue Ain't Your Color"	Keith Urban – "Blue Ain't Your Color"	Carrie Underwood – "Church Bells"	Lauren Alaina – "Road Less Traveled"	
2018	Blake Shelton – "I'll Name the Dogs"	Blake Shelton – "I'll Name the Dogs"	Carrie Underwood – "The Champion" (featuring Ludacris)	Carly Pearce – "Every Little Thing"	
2019	Carrie Underwood – "Cry Pretty"	Kane Brown – "Lose It"	Carrie Underwood – "Love Wins"	Ashley McBryde – "Girl Goin' Nowhere"	
2020	Carrie Underwood – "Drinking Alone"	Luke Bryan – "One Margarita"	Carrie Underwood – "Drinking Alone"	Gabby Barrett – "I Hope"	
2021	Carrie Underwood – "Hallelujah" (featuring John Legend)	Kane Brown – "Worship You"	Gabby Barrett – "The Good Ones"	Dylan Scott – "Nobody"	
2022	Jason Aldean & Carrie Underwood – "If I Didn't Love You"	Cody Johnson – "'Til You Can't"	Miranda Lambert – "If I Was a Cowboy"	Parker McCollum – "To Be Loved By You"	
2023	Kane Brown & Katelyn Brown – "Thank God"	Jelly Roll – "Son of a Sinner"	Lainey Wilson – "Heart Like a Truck"	Jelly Roll – "Son of a Sinner"	Megan Moroney – "Tennessee Orange"
2024	Jelly Roll – "Need a Favor"	Jelly Roll – "Need a Favor"	Lainey Wilson – "Watermelon Moonshine"	Warren Zeiders – "Pretty Little Poison"	Ashley Cooke – "Your Place"

== Winning records ==
Carrie Underwood is the most awarded artist overall in CMT Music Awards' history (2005–present), with 25 wins.

=== By category ===
- Video of the Year: Carrie Underwood; ten wins
- Male Video of the Year: Kenny Chesney; five wins
- Female Video of the Year: Carrie Underwood; eight wins
- Collaborative Video of the Year: Carrie Underwood; four wins
- CMT Performance of the Year: Carrie Underwood, Luke Bryan and Jason Aldean (tie); two wins each

== CMT Artists of the Year ==
Year	Recipient
2010	Jason Aldean; Lady Antebellum; Taylor Swift; Carrie Underwood; Zac Brown Band
2011	Jason Aldean; Kenny Chesney; Brad Paisley; Lady Antebellum; Taylor Swift
2012	Jason Aldean; Luke Bryan; Kenny Chesney; Eric Church; Toby Keith; Miranda Lambert; Carrie Underwood
2013	Jason Aldean; Luke Bryan; Florida Georgia Line; Hunter Hayes; Tim McGraw
2014	Jason Aldean; Luke Bryan; Florida Georgia Line; Miranda Lambert; Keith Urban
2015	Luke Bryan; Florida Georgia Line; Sam Hunt; Little Big Town; Blake Shelton
2016	Luke Bryan; Florida Georgia Line; Thomas Rhett; Chris Stapleton; Carrie Underwood
2017	Jason Aldean; Luke Bryan; Florida Georgia Line; Chris Stapleton; Keith Urban
2018	Kelsea Ballerini; Karen Fairchild & Kimberly Schlapman; Miranda Lambert; Maren Morris; Hillary Scott; Carrie Underwood
2019	Kane Brown; Luke Combs; Dan + Shay; Thomas Rhett; Carrie Underwood
2020	Cancelled due to COVID-19 Pandemic
2021	Kelsea Ballerini; Gabby Barrett; Kane Brown; Luke Combs; Chris Stapleton
2022	Kane Brown; Luke Combs; Walker Hayes; Cody Johnson; Carly Pearce
