= 16 Biggest Hits (Ricky Van Shelton album) =

- 2009 re-issue

Greatest hits album by Ricky Van Shelton
- Released: 2 February 1999
- Genre: Country
- Length: 50:18
- Label: Columbia Nashville, Legacy
- Producer: Steve Buckingham

Ricky Van Shelton chronology
Making Plans (1998)	16 Biggest Hits (1999)	Fried Green Tomatoes (2000)

Professional ratings
Review scores
Source	Rating
Allmusic	4.5/5 stars

16 Biggest Hits is a budget priced compilation album from country music artist Ricky Van Shelton. This is one of many similar compilations released by various record labels to capitalize on its catalogue and especially Ricky Van Shelton. This was his last overall album for Columbia Records. It was re-released on March 24, 2009.

== Track listing ==
No.	Title	Writer(s)	Original Album	Length
1.	"Somebody Lied"	Joe Chambers, Larry Jenkins	Wild-Eyed Dream	3:21
2.	"Life Turned Her That Way"	Harlan Howard	Wild-Eyed Dream	3:23
3.	"Don't We All Have the Right"	Roger Miller	Wild-Eyed Dream	2:36
4.	"I'll Leave This World Loving You"	Wayne Kemp, Mack Vickery	Loving Proof	3:06
5.	"From a Jack to a King"	Ned Miller	Loving Proof	2:21
6.	"Living Proof"	Steve Clark, Johnny MacRae	Loving Proof	3:22
7.	"I've Cried My Last Tear for You"	Tony King, Chris Waters	RVS III	2:29
8.	"I Am a Simple Man"	Walt Aldridge	Backroads	3:26
9.	"Keep It Between the Lines"	Russell Smith, Cathy Louvin	Backroads	3:49
10.	"Statue of a Fool"	Jan Crutchfield	RVS III	3:04
11.	"I Meant Every Word He Said"	Joe Chambers, Bucky Jones, Curly Putman	RVS III	3:03
12.	"Backroads"	Charlie Major	Backroads	3:42
13.	"Hole in My Pocket"	Boudleaux Bryant, Felice Bryant	Loving Proof	2:32
14.	"Life's Little Ups and Downs"	Margaret Ann Rich	RVS III	3:37
15.	"Crime of Passion"	Walt Aldridge, Mac McAnally	Wild-Eyed Dream	3:27
16.	"Wild Man"	Rick Giles. Susan Longacre	Greatest Hits Plus	3:17

== Release history ==
Year	Type	Label	Catalogue
1999	Cassette	Columbia/Legacy	69737
1999	CD	Columbia/Legacy	69737
2009	CD	Legacy	8869741336
