= Super Hits (Ricky Van Shelton album) =

Greatest hits album by Ricky Van Shelton
- Released: May 2, 1995
- Genre: Country
- Length: 30:48
- Label: Columbia Nashville
- Producer: Steve Buckingham; Joe Casey

Ricky Van Shelton chronology
Love and Honor (1994)	Super Hits (1995)	Super Hits Vol. 2 (1996)

Super Hits is a budget music compilation of Ricky Van Shelton released by Columbia Records after he had left the label. Sony Records re-released the compilation the same year under their budget label with a different cover. It includes many of his hit singles as well as album tracks.

Super Hits was certified Gold by the RIAA for sales of 500,000 copies.

== Track listing ==
No.	Title	Writer(s)	Length
1.	"Statue of a Fool"	Jan Crutchfield	3:04
2.	"I've Cried My Last Tear for You"	Tony King, Chris Waters	2:29
3.	"I'll Leave This World Loving You"	Wayne Kemp	3:06
4.	"Life Turned Her That Way"	Harlan Howard	3:23
5.	"Don't We All Have the Right"	Roger Miller	2:36
6.	"Crime of Passion"	Walt Aldridge, Mac McAnally	3:27
7.	"Keep It Between the Lines"	Russell Smith, Cathy Louvin	3:49
8.	"I Am a Simple Man"	Walt Aldridge	3:26
9.	"Somebody Lied"	Joe Chambers, Larry Jenkins	3:21
10.	"From a Jack to a King"	Ned Miller	2:21

== Critical reception ==
Professional ratings
Review scores
Source	Rating
Allmusic	4/5 stars

Super Hits received four out of five stars from Stephen Thomas Erlewine of Allmusic. Erlewine concludes that the album is "not bad" but "far from definitive.".

== Chart performance ==
Super Hits peaked at #64 on the U.S. Billboard Top Country Albums chart the week of June 17, 1995.

Chart (1995)	Peak position
U.S. Billboard Top Country Albums	64
