= List of RPM number-one country singles of 1989 =

These are the Canadian number-one country songs of 1989, per the RPM Country Tracks chart.

Issue date	Title	Artist	Source
January 14	Change of Heart	The Judds	
January 21	Hold Me	K. T. Oslin	
January 28	Deeper Than the Holler	Randy Travis	
February 4	She's Crazy for Leavin'	Rodney Crowell	
February 6	Song of the South	Alabama	
February 13	What I'd Say	Earl Thomas Conley	
February 20	I Sang Dixie	Dwight Yoakam	
February 27	Big Wheels in the Moonlight	Dan Seals	
March 6	I Still Believe in You	The Desert Rose Band	
March 13	Highway Robbery	Tanya Tucker	
March 20	From a Jack to a King	Ricky Van Shelton	
March 27	New Fool at an Old Game	Reba McEntire	
April 3	Baby's Gotten Good at Goodbye	George Strait	
April 10	I'm No Stranger to the Rain	Keith Whitley	
April 17	Who You Gonna Blame It On This Time	Vern Gosdin	
April 24	I'm No Stranger to the Rain	Keith Whitley	
May 1	The Church on Cumberland Road	Shenandoah	
May 8	Hey Bobby	K. T. Oslin	
May 15	Young Love (Strong Love)	The Judds	
May 22	Is It Still Over?	Randy Travis	
May 29	If I Had You	Alabama	
June 5	After All This Time	Rodney Crowell	
June 12	Where Did I Go Wrong	Steve Wariner	
June 19	A Better Man	Clint Black	
June 26	I Don't Want to Spoil the Party	Rosanne Cash	
July 3	Hole in My Pocket	Ricky Van Shelton	
July 10	Come From the Heart	Kathy Mattea	
July 17	Lovin' Only Me	Ricky Skaggs	
July 24	In a Letter to You	Eddy Raven	
July 31	Cathy's Clown	Reba McEntire	
August 7	Why'd You Come in Here Lookin' Like That	Dolly Parton	
August 14	Sunday in the South	Shenandoah	
August 21	Why'd You Come in Here Lookin' Like That	Dolly Parton	
August 28	Timber, I'm Falling in Love	Patty Loveless	
September 4	I'm Still Crazy	Vern Gosdin	
September 11	I Wonder Do You Think of Me	Keith Whitley	
September 18	Full Moon Full of Love	k.d. lang	
September 25	Nothing I Can Do About it Now	Willie Nelson	
October 2	Above and Beyond	Rodney Crowell	
October 9	Let Me Tell You About Love	The Judds	
October 16	Killin' Time	Clint Black	
October 23	Living Proof	Ricky Van Shelton	
November 4	High Cotton	Alabama	
November 11	Ace in the Hole	George Strait	
November 18	Say What's in Your Heart	Restless Heart	
November 25	Bayou Boys	Eddy Raven	
December 2	It's Just a Matter of Time	Randy Travis	
December 9	It's Just a Matter of Time	Randy Travis	
December 16	Yellow Roses	Dolly Parton	
December 23	Two Dozen Roses	Shenandoah	

== See also ==
- 1989 in music
- List of number-one country hits of 1989 (U.S.)
