= List of Hot Country Singles number ones of 1989 =

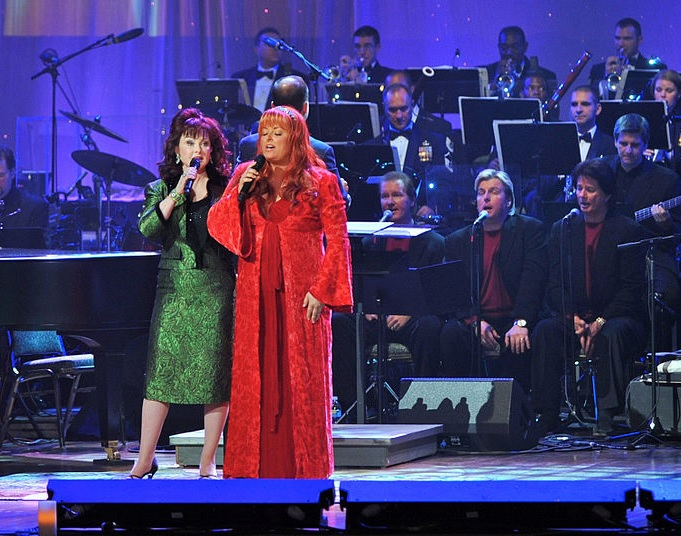
The Judds (pictured performing in 2008) were among a number of acts with three number ones in 1989.

Hot Country Songs is a record chart that ranks the top-performing country music songs in the United States, published by Billboard magazine. In 1989, 50 songs topped the chart, then published under the title Hot Country Singles, in 52 issues of the magazine. Only "I'm No Stranger to the Rain" by Keith Whitley and "The Church on Cumberland Road" by Shenandoah, consecutive chart-toppers in April, spent more than a single week at number one.

This was the final complete year in which Billboard used its longstanding methodology of compiling the chart based on playlists submitted by country music radio stations and sales reports submitted by stores. In January of the following year, the magazine would begin basing the chart on weekly airplay data from radio stations compiled by Nielsen Broadcast Data Systems, which would lead to an increase in the length of time songs spent in the top spot. In November 1989, Billboard began compiling unpublished prototype charts using the new methodology ahead of the official launch, which produced very different results to the published charts using the existing process. Ronnie Milsap's "A Woman in Love" spent five weeks atop the prototype charts as opposed to the single week which it achieved on the published listing. It was the 35th and final number one of Milsap's career.

Bands Alabama and Shenandoah, vocalists George Strait, Randy Travis and Rodney Crowell, and mother-daughter duo the Judds each reached number one with three different songs in 1989. As one of Shenandoah's songs spent a second week at number one, this meant that the band was the only act to spend four weeks in the top spot during the year. In June, Clint Black achieved his first number one with his debut single "A Better Man", which made him the first artist since Freddy Fender in 1975 to top the chart with his first charting release. Other artists to reach number one for the first time in 1989 were Holly Dunn, Patty Loveless, and Garth Brooks, who achieved the first chart-topper of his career with "If Tomorrow Never Comes". Brooks would go on to become one of the most successful artists in country music history, achieving unprecedented levels of album sales and selling out large stadiums in a manner previously associated only with rock stars. Rosanne Cash spent a week at number one in June with "I Don't Want to Spoil the Party", the only cover version of a song originally recorded by the Beatles to top the country singles chart. Keith Whitley's second number one of the year, "I Wonder Do You Think of Me", was the first of two posthumous number ones for the singer, who died on May 9, 1989.

== Chart history ==
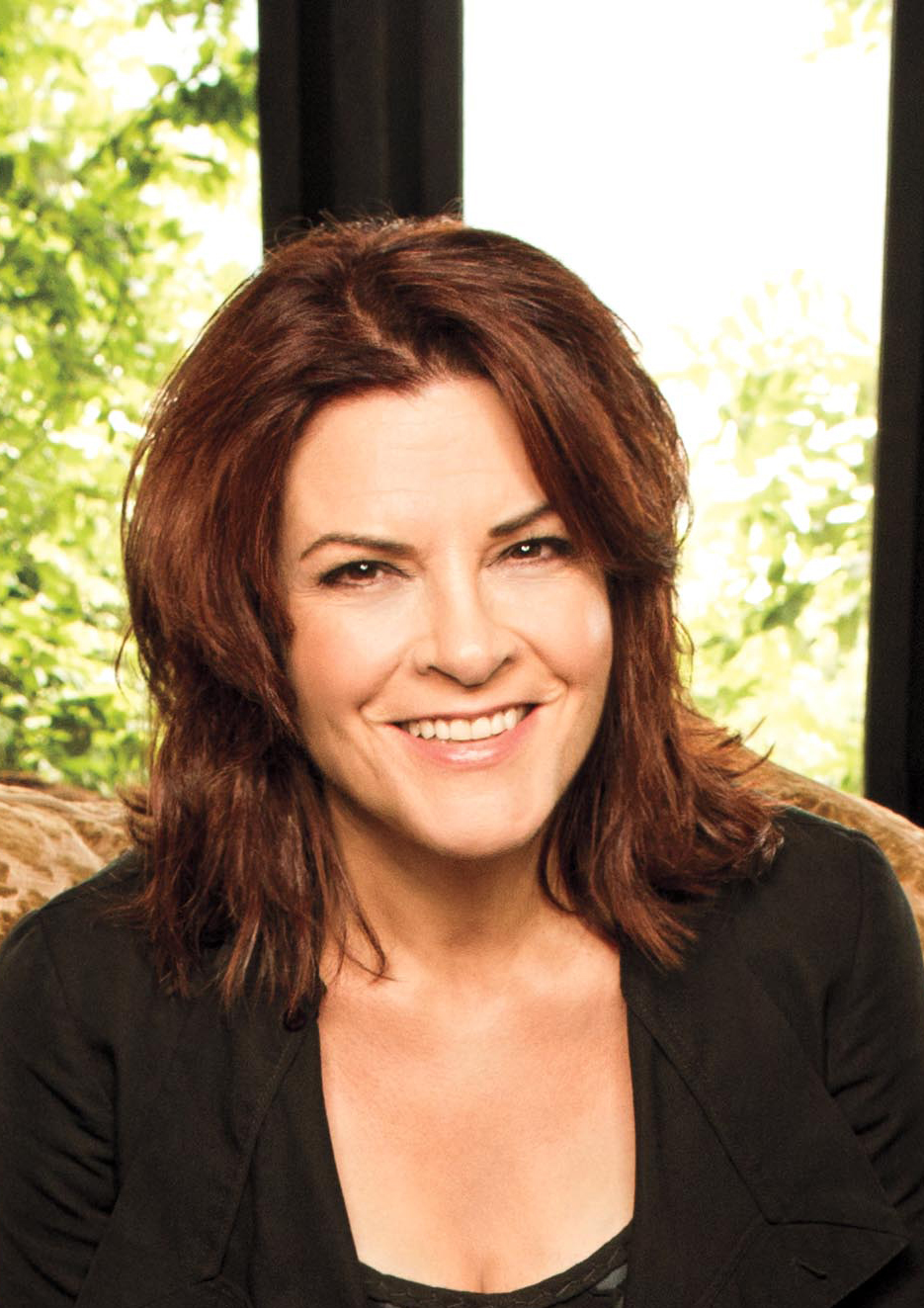
Rosanne Cash became the only artist to take a cover version of a Beatles song to number one on the country chart.

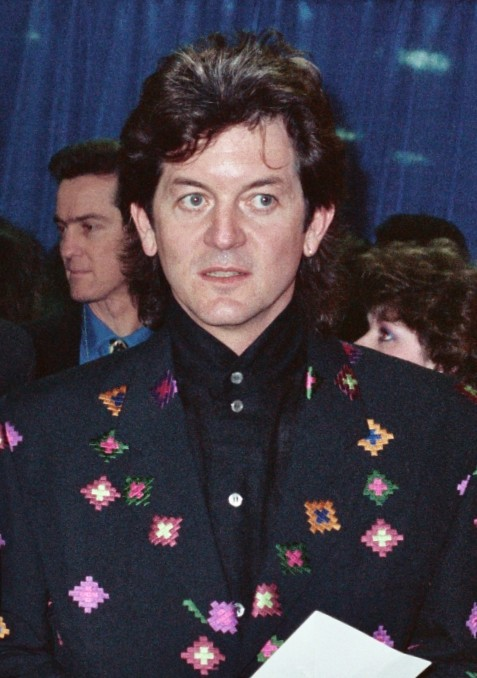
Cash's then-husband Rodney Crowell topped the chart three times in 1989.

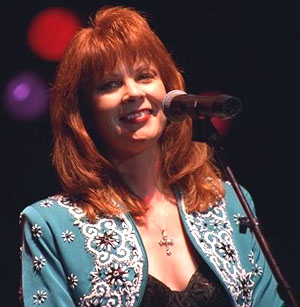
Patty Loveless was a first-time chart-topper in 1989.

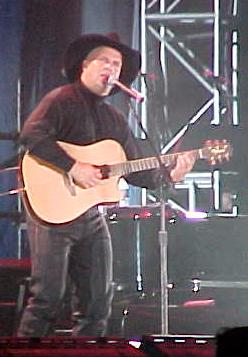
Garth Brooks topped the chart for the first time with "If Tomorrow Never Comes". He would go on to become one of the most successful artists in country music history.

Issue date	Title	Artist(s)	Ref.
January 7	"Hold Me"	K. T. Oslin	
January 14	"Change of Heart"	The Judds	
January 21	"She's Crazy for Leavin'"	Rodney Crowell	
January 28	"Deeper Than the Holler"	Randy Travis	
February 4	"What I'd Say"	Earl Thomas Conley	
February 11	"Song of the South"	Alabama	
February 18	"Big Wheels in the Moonlight"	Dan Seals	
February 25	"I Sang Dixie"	Dwight Yoakam	
March 4	"I Still Believe in You"	The Desert Rose Band	
March 11	"Don't You Ever Get Tired (Of Hurting Me)"	Ronnie Milsap	
March 18	"From a Jack to a King"	Ricky Van Shelton	
March 25	"New Fool at an Old Game"	Reba McEntire	
April 1	"Baby's Gotten Good at Goodbye"	George Strait	
April 8	"I'm No Stranger to the Rain"	Keith Whitley	
April 15	"I'm No Stranger to the Rain"	Keith Whitley	
April 22	"The Church on Cumberland Road"	Shenandoah	
April 29	"The Church on Cumberland Road"	Shenandoah	
May 6	"Young Love (Strong Love)"	The Judds	
May 13	"Is It Still Over?"	Randy Travis	
May 20	"If I Had You"	Alabama	
May 27	"After All This Time"	Rodney Crowell	
June 3	"Where Did I Go Wrong"	Steve Wariner	
June 10	"A Better Man"	Clint Black	
June 17	"Love Out Loud"	Earl Thomas Conley	
June 24	"I Don't Want to Spoil the Party"	Rosanne Cash	
July 1	"Come from the Heart"	Kathy Mattea	
July 8	"Lovin' Only Me"	Ricky Skaggs	
July 15	"In a Letter to You"	Eddy Raven	
July 22	"What's Going On in Your World"	George Strait	
July 29	"Cathy's Clown"	Reba McEntire	
August 5	"Why'd You Come in Here Lookin' Like That"	Dolly Parton	
August 12	"Timber, I'm Falling in Love"	Patty Loveless	
August 19	"Sunday in the South"	Shenandoah	
August 26	"Are You Ever Gonna Love Me"	Holly Dunn	
September 2	"I'm Still Crazy"	Vern Gosdin	
September 9	"I Wonder Do You Think of Me"	Keith Whitley	
September 16	"Nothing I Can Do About It Now"	Willie Nelson	
September 23	"Above and Beyond"	Rodney Crowell	
September 30	"Let Me Tell You About Love"	The Judds	
October 7	"I Got Dreams"	Steve Wariner	
October 14	"Killin' Time"	Clint Black	
October 21	"Living Proof"	Ricky Van Shelton	
October 28	"High Cotton"	Alabama	
November 4	"Ace in the Hole"	George Strait	
November 11	"Burnin' Old Memories"	Kathy Mattea	
November 18	"Bayou Boys"	Eddy Raven	
November 25	"Yellow Roses"	Dolly Parton	
December 2	"It's Just a Matter of Time"	Randy Travis	
December 9	"If Tomorrow Never Comes"	Garth Brooks	
December 16	"Two Dozen Roses"	Shenandoah	
December 23	"A Woman in Love"	Ronnie Milsap	
December 30	"Who's Lonely Now"	Highway 101	

== See also ==
- 1989 in music
- List of artists who reached number one on the U.S. country chart
