= 25th TNN/Music City News Country Awards =

US country music awards ceremony in 1991

- Date: June 10, 1991
- Location: Grand Ole Opry House, Nashville, Tennessee
- Hosted by: Roy Clark; Tanya Tucker

Highlights
- Most wins: Vince Gill; Alan Jackson; Ricky Van Shelton (2 each)
- Most nominations: Garth Brooks; Vince Gill (6 each)

Television/radio coverage
- Network: TNN

The 25th TNN/Music City News Country Awards was held on June 10, 1991, at the Grand Ole Opry House, in Nashville, Tennessee. The ceremony was hosted by Roy Clark and Tanya Tucker.

== Winners and nominees ==
Winners are shown in bold.

Entertainer of the Year	Album of the Year
**Ricky Van Shelton**; Garth Brooks; The Statlers; George Strait; Randy Travis	**Here in the Real World — Alan Jackson**; Heroes & Friends — Randy Travis; No Fences — Garth Brooks; RVS III — Ricky Van Shelton; When I Call Your Name — Vince Gill
Female Artist of the Year	Male Artist of the Year
**Reba McEntire**; Patty Loveless; Kathy Mattea; Lorrie Morgan; Tanya Tucker	**Ricky Van Shelton**; Clint Black; Garth Brooks; George Strait; Randy Travis
Vocal Group of the Year	Vocal Duo of the Year
**The Statlers**; Alabama; The Kentucky Headhunters; Oak Ridge Boys; Shenandoah	**The Judds**; Baillie and the Boys; Bellamy Brothers; Sweethearts of the Rodeo; Williams and Ree
Single of the Year	Video of the Year
"**When I Call Your Name**" — **Vince Gill**; "The Dance" — Garth Brooks; "Friends in Low Places" — Garth Brooks; "I Meant Every Word He Said" — Ricky Van Shelton; "'Til a Tear Becomes a Rose" — Lorrie Morgan and Keith Whitley	**"The Dance"** — **Garth Brooks**; "He Walked on Water" — Randy Travis; "I Meant Every Word He Said" — Ricky Van Shelton; "Pass It On Down" — Alabama; "When I Call Your Name" — Vince Gill
Star of Tomorrow	Vocal Collaboration of the Year
**Alan Jackson**; Garth Brooks; Carlene Carter; Doug Stone; Travis Tritt	**Lorrie Morgan** **and** **Keith Whitley**; T. Graham Brown and Tanya Tucker; Vince Gill and Patty Loveless; Vince Gill and Reba McEntire; Randy Travis and George Jones
Gospel Act of the Year	Comedian of the Year
**The Chuck Wagon Gang**; The Cathedrals; Cumberland Boys; Fox Brothers; J.D. Sumner and the Stamps	**Ray Stevens**; Andy Andrews; Jerry Clower; Shotgun Red; Williams and Ree
Instrumentalist of the Year
**Vince Gill**; Chet Atkins; Roy Clark; Ricky Skaggs; Mike Snider
Living Legend Award
**Tammy Wynette**
Minnie Pearl Award
**Barbara Mandrell**

== See also ==
- CMT Music Awards
