= List of Top Country Albums number ones of 1988 =

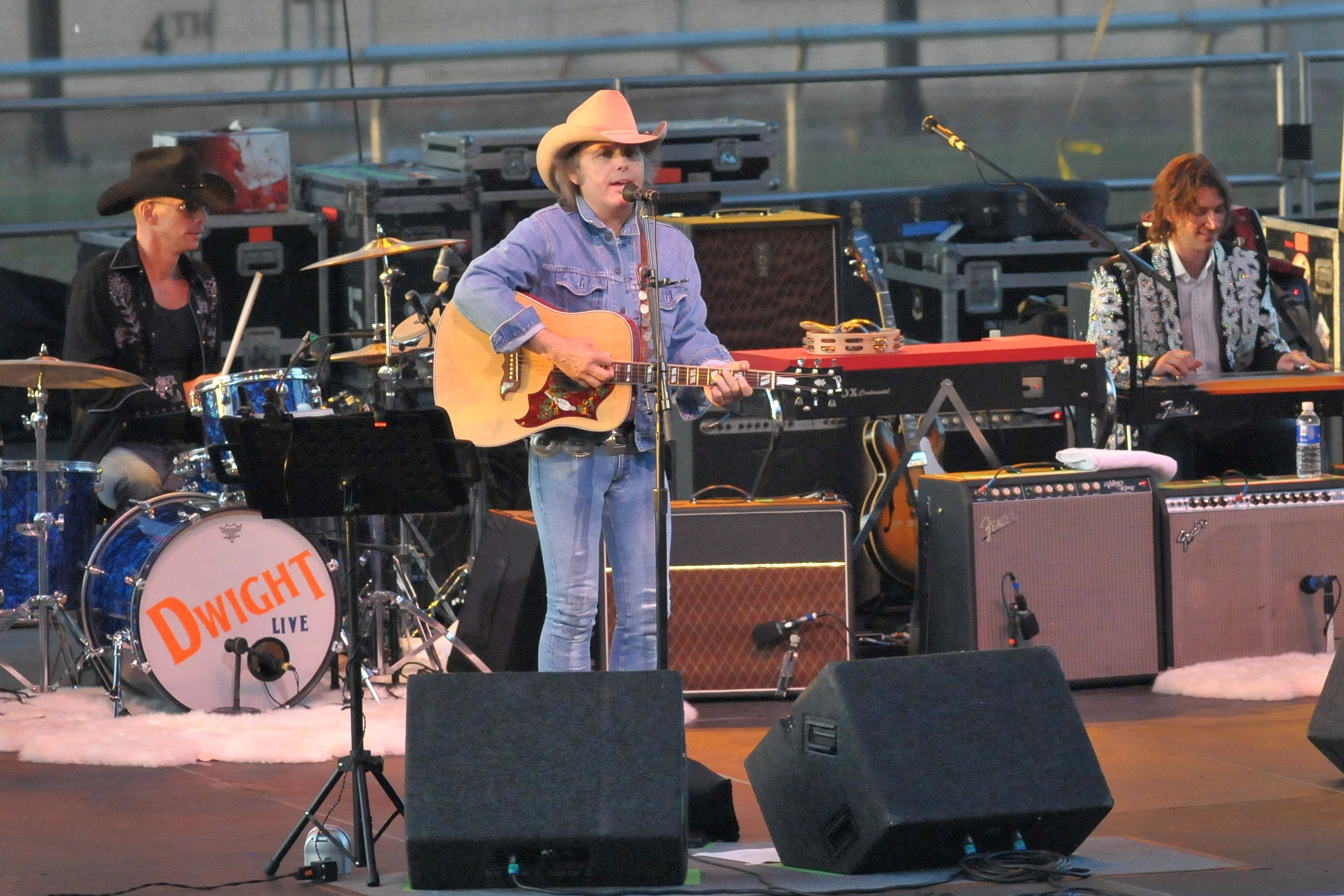
Dwight Yoakam topped the chart in 1988 with his album Buenas Noches from a Lonely Room.

Top Country Albums is a chart that ranks the top-performing country music albums in the United States, published by Billboard. In 1988, 11 different albums topped the chart, based on sales reports submitted by a representative sample of stores nationwide.

In the issue of Billboard dated January 2, Randy Travis was at number one with the album Always & Forever, its 26th week in the top spot. Three weeks later the album broke the previous record of 28 weeks at number one set by the band Alabama with both Feels So Right and Mountain Music between 1981 and 1983. Always & Forever would ultimately spend a total of 43 weeks at number one; its record would stand until Shania Twain spent 50 weeks atop the chart with Come On Over between 1997 and 2000. Two months after Always & Forever finally left the top spot, Travis returned to number one with Old 8x10, which would spend eight weeks atop the chart in 1988 and double that figure early the following year. The singer would achieve a fourth consecutive number one in 1989 before his chart performance began to decline in the subsequent decade.

In addition to Travis, Ricky Van Shelton had two number ones in 1988. After years of playing small venues while working a day job, Shelton had secured his first major-label record deal in 1986 at the age of 34. His debut album, Wild-Eyed Dream, entered the Top Country Albums chart in March 1987 and took an entire year to reach number one, finally topping the chart in its 52nd week on the listing. Shelton returned to number one in November with Loving Proof, which spent the final nine weeks of 1988 in the top spot. K. T. Oslin also topped the chart for the first time in 1988; she spent the sole week of her career at number one when 80's Ladies topped the listing in the issue of Billboard dated February 27.

== Chart history ==
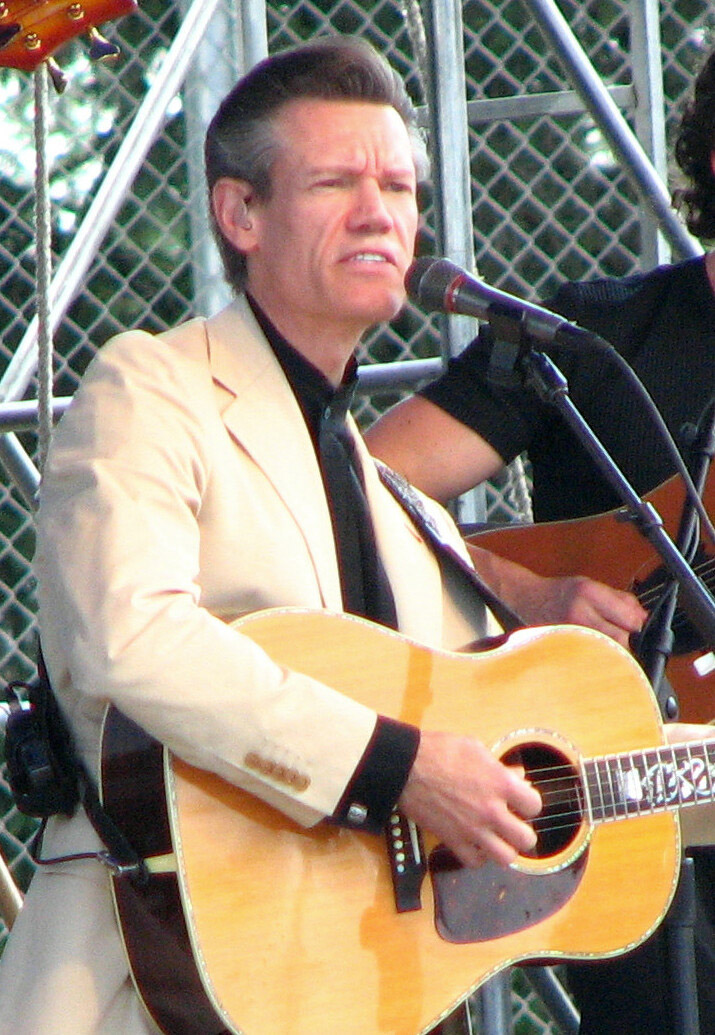
Randy Travis continued his record-breaking run at number one with Always & Forever, which had first topped the chart the previous summer, and later returned to the top spot with Old 8x10.

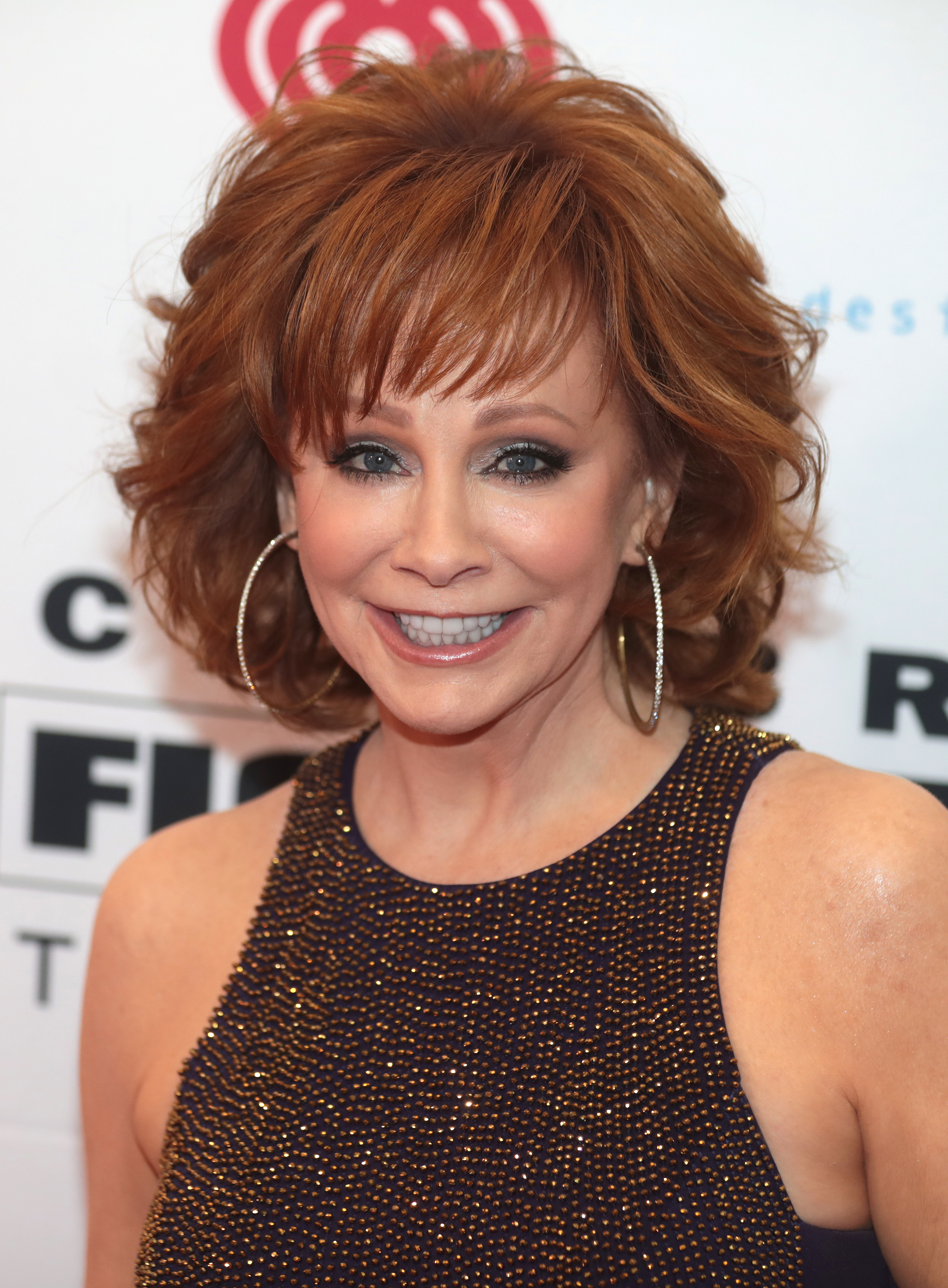
Reba McEntire topped the chart with the album Reba.

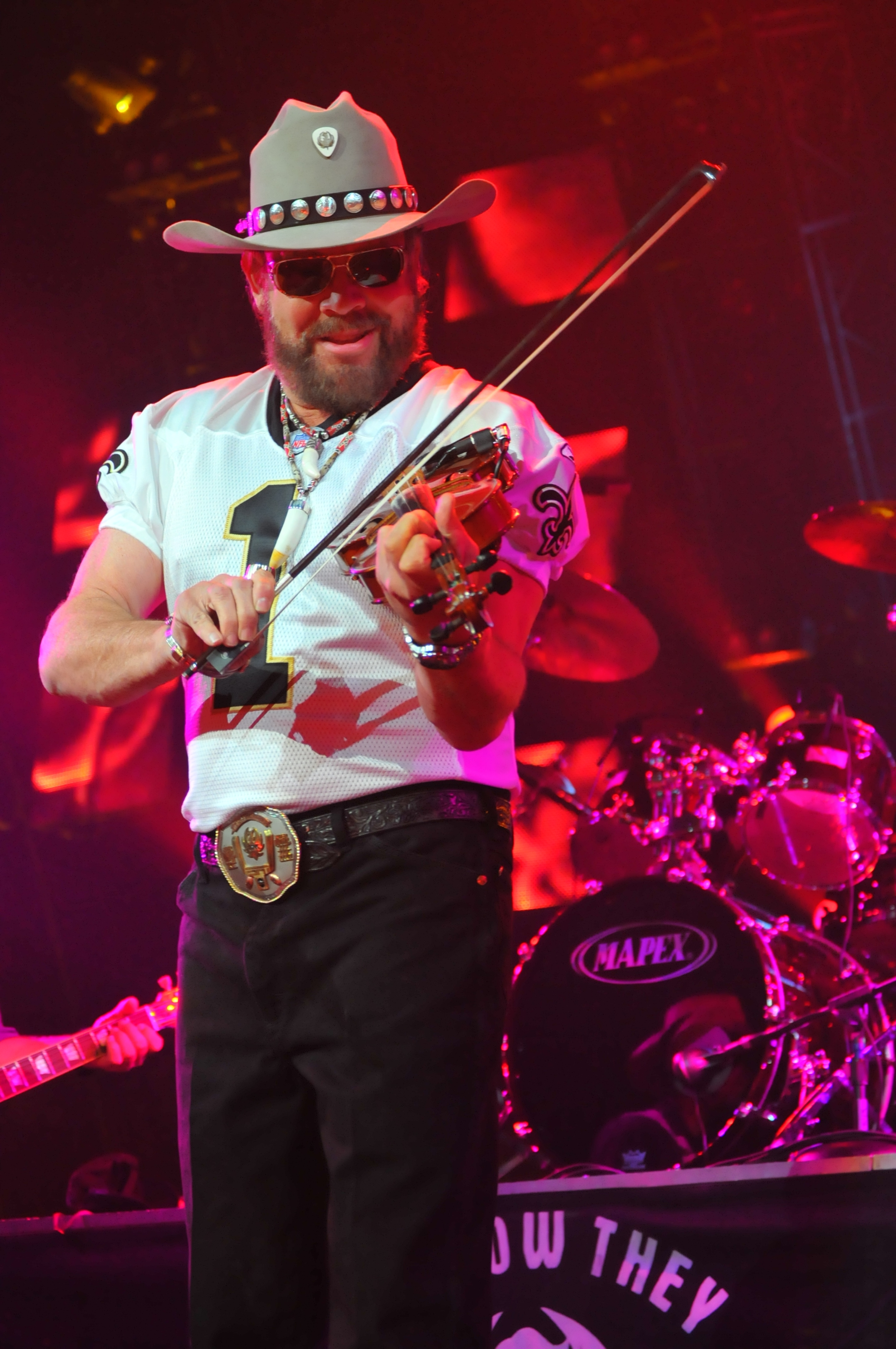
Hank Williams Jr. continued a run of consecutive number ones with Wild Streak.

Issue date	Title	Artist(s)	Ref.
January 2	Always & Forever	Randy Travis	
January 9	Always & Forever	Randy Travis	
January 16	Always & Forever	Randy Travis	
January 23	Always & Forever	Randy Travis	
January 30	Always & Forever	Randy Travis	
February 6	Always & Forever	Randy Travis	
February 13	Always & Forever	Randy Travis	
February 20	Always & Forever	Randy Travis	
February 27	80's Ladies	K. T. Oslin	
March 5	Wild-Eyed Dream	Ricky Van Shelton	
March 12	Always & Forever	Randy Travis	
March 19	Always & Forever	Randy Travis	
March 26	Always & Forever	Randy Travis	
April 2	Always & Forever	Randy Travis	
April 9	Always & Forever	Randy Travis	
April 16	Wild-Eyed Dream	Ricky Van Shelton	
April 23	If You Ain't Lovin', You Ain't Livin'	George Strait	
April 30	If You Ain't Lovin', You Ain't Livin'	George Strait	
May 7	Always & Forever	Randy Travis	
May 14	Always & Forever	Randy Travis	
May 21	Always & Forever	Randy Travis	
May 28	Always & Forever	Randy Travis	
June 4	Always & Forever	Randy Travis	
June 11	Reba	Reba McEntire	
June 18	Reba	Reba McEntire	
June 25	Reba	Reba McEntire	
July 2	Reba	Reba McEntire	
July 9	Reba	Reba McEntire	
July 16	Reba	Reba McEntire	
July 23	Reba	Reba McEntire	
July 30	Reba	Reba McEntire	
August 6	Alabama Live	Alabama	
August 13	Wild Streak	Hank Williams Jr.	
August 20	Wild Streak	Hank Williams Jr.	
August 27	Old 8x10	Randy Travis	
September 3	Old 8x10	Randy Travis	
September 10	Old 8x10	Randy Travis	
September 17	Old 8x10	Randy Travis	
September 24	Old 8x10	Randy Travis	
October 1	Old 8x10	Randy Travis	
October 8	Old 8x10	Randy Travis	
October 15	Old 8x10	Randy Travis	
October 22	Buenas Noches from a Lonely Room	Dwight Yoakam	
October 29	Greatest Hits	The Judds	
November 5	Loving Proof	Ricky Van Shelton	
November 12	Loving Proof	Ricky Van Shelton	
November 19	Loving Proof	Ricky Van Shelton	
November 26	Loving Proof	Ricky Van Shelton	
December 3	Loving Proof	Ricky Van Shelton	
December 10	Loving Proof	Ricky Van Shelton	
December 17	Loving Proof	Ricky Van Shelton	
December 24	Loving Proof	Ricky Van Shelton	
December 31	Loving Proof	Ricky Van Shelton	
