= Loving Proof =

Loving Proof may refer to:

- Loving Proof (album), a 1988 album by Ricky Van Shelton
- "Lovin' Proof", a 1993 song by Celine Dion from The Colour of My Love
