= Life's Little Ups and Downs =

Single by Charlie Rich

from the album The Fabulous Charlie Rich
- B-side: "It Takes Time"
- Released: 1969
- Studio: Columbia (Nashville, Tennessee)
- Genre: Country pop
- Length: 3:40
- Label: Epic #10492
- Songwriter: Margaret Ann Rich
- Producer: Billy Sherrill

Charlie Rich singles chronology
| "Raggedy Ann" (1968) | "Life's Little Ups and Downs" (1969) | "Who Will the Next Fool Be" (1970) |

"Life's Little Ups and Downs" is a song originally recorded by Charlie Rich. Written by his wife, Margaret Ann Rich, the song appears on his second Epic album, 1969's The Fabulous Charlie Rich. His rendition spent eleven weeks on the country music charts in 1969, peaking at #41.

== Critical reception ==
Rolling Stone magazine praised the song in its own review upon its release, calling it "as good as anything he's ever done" and predicting that the song "could make it on all the charts at once: R&B, Pop, Easy Listening and Country".

== Chart performance ==
| Chart (1969) | Peak position |
|---|---|
| US Hot Country Songs (Billboard) | 41 |

== Ricky Van Shelton version ==
"Life's Little Ups and Downs"

Single by Ricky Van Shelton

from the album RVS III
- B-side: "Love Is Burnin'"
- Released: October 1990
- Genre: Country
- Length: 3:37
- Label: Columbia Nashville #73587
- Songwriter: Margaret Ann Rich
- Producer: Steve Buckingham

Ricky Van Shelton singles chronology
| "I Meant Every Word He Said" (1990) | "Life's Little Ups and Downs" (1990) | "Rockin' Years" (1991) |

In 1990, Ricky Van Shelton covered the song on his third studio album, RVS III. Shelton's version of the song was released in October 1990 as the final single from that album. It spent twenty weeks on the country music charts and peaked at #4.

=== Chart performance ===
| Chart (1990–1991) | Peak position |
|---|---|
| Canada Country Singles (RPM) | 9 |
| US Hot Country Songs (Billboard) | 4 |

=== Year-end charts ===
| Chart (1991) | Position |
|---|---|
| US Country Songs (Billboard) | 44 |
