= Back to the Grindstone =

Studio album by Ronnie Milsap
- Released: March 12, 1991
- Recorded: 1990
- Studios: GroundStar Laboratory (Nashville, Tennessee)
- Genre: Country
- Length: 46:10
- Label: RCA
- Producers: Ronnie Milsap; Rob Galbraith; Richard Landis

Ronnie Milsap chronology
Stranger Things Have Happened (1989)	Back to the Grindstone (1991)	Greatest Hits, Vol. 3 (1991)

Singles from Back to the Grindstone
- 1. "Are You Lovin' Me Like I'm Lovin' You" Released: March 9, 1991; 2. "Since I Don't Have You" Released: July 13, 1991; 3. "Turn That Radio On" Released: December 7, 1991; 4. "All Is Fair in Love and War" Released: February 1992

Professional ratings
Review scores
Source	Rating
Allmusic	3/5 stars

Back to the Grindstone is the twentieth studio album by American country music artist Ronnie Milsap, released on March 12, 1991. The album produced four singles, three of which reached the top ten on the Billboard country singles chart, including "Are You Lovin' Me Like I'm Lovin' You," "Since I Don't Have You," a cover of The Skyliners' 1958 standard and "Turn That Radio On." The fourth single, "All Is Fair in Love and War" peaked at number 11. Milsap produced the album with Rob Galbraith, with further assistance from Richard Landis on "Since I Don't Have You".

The album reached number 24 on country charts, and was Milsap's last crossover until Then Sings My Soul in 2009, peaking at number 172 on the Billboard 200. Allmusic praised Milsap for a "gutsy [and] powerful performance" on the record, stating that "not one of the ten songs...is weak." The publication characterized it as "one of his best albums," lauding the performer's "eclectic, soul-inflected R&B" style.

== Track listing ==
No.	Title	Writer(s)	Length
1.	"Since I Don't Have You"	Joseph Rock, James Beaumont	4:16
2.	"All Is Fair in Love and War"	Tim Nichols, Robert Byrne	4:08
3.	"Are You Lovin' Me Like I'm Lovin' You"	J. C. Cunningham, Steve Stone	4:23
4.	"When the Hurt Comes Down"	Roger Murrah, Keith Stegall, Thomas Cain	4:07
5.	"Back to the Grindstone"	Dave Loggins	4:44
6.	"Spare the Rod (Love the Child)"	Jeff Silbar, Jeff Pescetto, Mark Mueller	5:37
7.	"Love Certified" (duet with Patti LaBelle)	Chuck Jones, J. D. Martin	4:41
8.	"Turn That Radio On"	Paul Davis, Archie Jordan	3:40
9.	"Old Habits Are Hard to Break"	John Hiatt, Marshall Chapman	6:06
10.	"I Ain't Gonna Cry No More"	Don Schlitz, John Hall, Johanna Hall	4:25

== Personnel ==
- Ronnie Milsap – lead vocals, backing vocals, keyboards
- Mitch Humphries – keyboards
- Shane Keister – keyboards, synthesizers, synthesizer sequencing, drum programming
- Larry Knechtel – keyboards
- Mike Lawler – synthesizers
- Jay Spell – keyboards
- Paul Davis – backing vocals, synthesizer sequencing (8), drum programming (8)
- Mark Casstevens – acoustic guitar
- Don Potter – acoustic guitar
- Vince Gill – acoustic guitar (3)
- Dave Baker – electric guitar
- Larry Byrom – electric guitar
- Bruce Dees – electric guitar, backing vocals
- Steve Gibson – electric guitar
- Jon Goin – electric guitar
- Chuck Jones – electric guitar, horn arrangements (7)
- Dean Parks – electric guitar
- Brent Rowan – electric guitar
- Mark Knopfler – electric guitar (2)
- John Hiatt – electric guitar (9)
- Sonny Garrish – steel guitar
- Weldon Myrick – steel guitar
- David Hungate – bass
- Bob Wray – bass
- Paul Leim – drums (1, 3–10)
- Larrie Londin – drums (2)
- Farrell Morris – percussion
- Terry McMillan – harmonica
- Quitman Dennis – horns
- Jim Horn – horns, saxophone solos
- Denis Solee – horns
- Frank Kavelin – horns
- Charles Rose – horns
- Mike Haynes – horns
- George Tidwell – horns
- Bergen White – horn arrangements
- J.D. Martin – horn arrangements (7)
- Charlie Calello – string arrangements and conductor
- The Robert Jason Singers – backing vocals (1)
- Carol Chase – backing vocals
- Cindy Richardson-Walker – backing vocals
- Lisa Silver – backing vocals
- Vicki Hampton – backing vocals (6)
- Donna McElroy – backing vocals (6)
- Michael Mishaw – backing vocals (6)
- Scat Springs – backing vocals (6)
- The Boys Choir of Harlem – choir (6)
- Patti LaBelle – lead vocals (7)
- Jamie Brantley – backing vocals (7)
- Steve Brantley – backing vocals (7)

=== Production ===
- Rob Galbraith – producer
- Ronnie Milsap – producer
- Richard Landis – producer (1)
- Ed Thacker – track recording (1)
- Ben Harris – track recording (2–10), overdub recording
- Keith Odle – overdub recording
- Randy Gardner – tracking assistant, overdubbing assistant
- Kyle Lehning – mixing
- Milan Bogdan – digital editing
- Doug Sax – mastering at The Mastering Lab (Hollywood, California)
- Sandy Howell – session coordinator
- Mary Hamilton – art direction
- Deb Mahalanobis – design
- Randee St. Nicholas – photography
- Beverly Patterson – hair stylist, make-up

== Chart performance ==
=== Weekly charts ===
Chart (1991)	Peak position
US Billboard 200	172
US Top Country Albums (Billboard)	24

=== Year-end charts ===
Chart (1991)	Position
US Top Country Albums (Billboard)	64

=== Singles ===
Year	Single	Peak chart positions		
Year	Single	US Country	US AC	CAN Country
1991	"Are You Lovin' Me Like I'm Lovin' You"	3	—	3
1991	"Since I Don't Have You"	6	25	7
1991	"Turn That Radio On"	4	—	2
1992	"All Is Fair in Love and War"	11	—	13
