= Are You Lovin' Me Like I'm Lovin' You =

Single by Ronnie Milsap

from the album Back to the Grindstone
- B-side: "Back to the Grindstone"
- Released: March 9, 1991
- Genre: Country
- Length: 4:25
- Label: RCA
- Songwriters: Johnny Cunningham, Steve Stone
- Producers: Ronnie Milsap, Rob Galbraith

Ronnie Milsap singles chronology
"Stranger Things Have Happened" (1990)	"Are You Lovin' Me Like I'm Lovin' You" (1991)	"Since I Don't Have You" (1991)

"Are You Lovin' Me Like I'm Lovin' You" is a song written by Johnny Cunningham and Steve Stone, and recorded by American country music artist Ronnie Milsap. It was released in March 1991 as the first single from the album Back to the Grindstone. The song reached #3 on the Billboard Hot Country Singles & Tracks chart.

== Chart performance ==
Chart (1991)	Peak position
Canada Country Singles (RPM)	3
US Hot Country Songs (Billboard)	3

=== Year-end charts ===
Chart (1991)	Position
Canada Country Tracks (RPM)	50
US Country Songs (Billboard)	35
