= Loving Proof (album) =

Studio album by Ricky Van Shelton
- Released: September 20, 1988
- Recorded: January – August 1988
- Genre: Country
- Length: 28:22
- Label: Columbia Nashville
- Producer: Steve Buckingham

Ricky Van Shelton chronology
Wild-Eyed Dream (1987)	Loving Proof (1988)	Ricky Van Shelton Sings Christmas (1989)

Singles from Living Proof
- 1. "I'll Leave This World Loving You" Released: August 14, 1988; 2. "From a Jack to a King" Released: December 24, 1988; 3. "Hole in My Pocket" Released: March 1989; 4. "Living Proof" Released: July 1989

Professional ratings
Review scores
Source	Rating
Allmusic	4/5 stars

Loving Proof is the second studio album by American country music artist Ricky Van Shelton. The Singles, "I'll Leave This World Loving You", "From a Jack to a King", and "Living Proof" all reached number one on the charts."Hole In My Pocket" reached number 4. The album was certified platinum by the RIAA on December 20, 1989.

Most of the songs on the album were originally recorded by other artists. "From a Jack to a King" is a cover of Ned Miller's crossover hit from 1962. "He's Got You" was first recorded by Patsy Cline as the opening track on her 1963 album, Sentimentally Yours. "I'll Leave This World Loving You" was originally recorded by Wayne Kemp and released as the B-side to his single "Harlan County" in 1974. "Don't Send Me No Angels" was originally recorded by Wayne Kemp and released in 1983. "Hole in My Pocket" was originally recorded by Little Jimmy Dickens and released in 1958. "Somebody's Back in Town" was originally recorded by The Wilburn Brothers and released in 1959.

== Track listing ==
Loving Proof track listing
No.	Title	Writer(s)	Length
1.	"Swimming Upstream"	Bucky Jones, Gary Nicholson	3:01
2.	"I'll Leave This World Loving You"	Wayne Kemp, Mack Vickery	3:06
3.	"From a Jack to a King"	Ned Miller	2:21
4.	"Let Me Live With Love (And Die with You)"	Skip Ewing, Red Lane	2:58
5.	"Living Proof"	Steve Clark, Johnny MacRae	3:22
6.	"Hole in My Pocket"	Boudleaux Bryant, Felice Bryant	2:32
7.	"The Picture"	Ricky Van Shelton, Troy Seals, Steve Buckingham	2:57
8.	"Somebody's Back in Town"	Doyle Wilburn, Teddy Wilburn, Don Helms	2:34
9.	"Don't Send Me No Angels"	Kemp	3:02
10.	"He's Got You"	Hank Cochran	3:16
Total length:			28:22

== Personnel ==
As listed in liner notes.

- Eddie Bayers - drums
- Steve Buckingham - backing vocals
- Dennis Burnside - piano
- Larry Byrom - acoustic guitar
- Mark Casstevens - acoustic guitar
- Paul Franklin - steel guitar
- Steve Gibson - electric guitar
- Roy Huskey Jr. - upright bass
- Randy McCormick - piano
- Farrell Morris - backing vocals
- Mark O'Connor - fiddle
- Tom Robb - bass guitar
- John Wesley Ryles - backing vocals
- Ricky Van Shelton - acoustic guitar, lead vocals
- Dennis Wilson - backing vocals

== Charts ==
=== Weekly charts ===
Chart (1988)	Peak position
Canadian Country Albums (RPM)	1
US Billboard 200	78
US Top Country Albums (Billboard)	1

=== Year-end charts ===
Chart (1989)	Position
US Top Country Albums (Billboard)	1
Chart (1990)	Position
US Top Country Albums (Billboard)	23

== Certifications ==
Region	Certification	Certified units/sales
Canada (Music Canada)	Platinum	100,000^{^}
United States (RIAA)	Platinum	1,000,000^{^}
^{^} Shipments figures based on certification alone.
