= RVS III =

Studio album by Ricky Van Shelton
- Released: January 16, 1990
- Recorded: May 1988 – June 1989
- Studio: The Dog House, Nightingale Recording Studio Omnisound Recording Nashville, TN
- Genre: Country
- Length: 34:22
- Label: Columbia Nashville
- Producer: Steve Buckingham

Ricky Van Shelton chronology
Ricky Van Shelton Sings Christmas (1989)	RVS III (1990)	Backroads (1991)

Singles from RVS III
- 1. "Statue of a Fool" Released: November 7, 1989; 2. "I've Cried My Last Tear for You" Released: February 27, 1990; 3. "I Meant Every Word He Said" Released: June 25, 1990; 4. "Life's Little Ups and Downs" Released: October 1990

Professional ratings
Review scores
Source	Rating
Allmusic	3/5 stars

RVS III is the fourth studio album by American country music artist Ricky Van Shelton. The singles released from the album were "Statue of a Fool" (#2), "I've Cried My Last Tear for You"(#1), "I Meant Every Word He Said" (#2), and "Life's Little Ups and Downs" (#4). The album was certified platinum by the RIAA on April 8, 1991.

The album includes several covers. "Oh, Pretty Woman" is a cover of Roy Orbison's famous song. "Sweet Memories" was first recorded by Andy Williams and released in 1968. It was later recorded by Willie Nelson in 1979 for his album of the same name. "Statue of a Fool" was a #1 hit for Jack Greene in 1969 and a #10 in 1974 for Brian Collins, and "Life's Little Ups and Downs" was a #41 for Charlie Rich in 1969.

== Track listing ==
RVS III track listing
No.	Title	Writer(s)	Length
1.	"I've Cried My Last Tear for You"	Tony King, Chris Waters	2:29
2.	"Statue of a Fool"	Jan Crutchfield	3:04
3.	"You Would Do the Same for Me"	Rory Bourke, Mike Reid	3:01
4.	"Life's Little Ups and Downs"	Margaret Ann Rich	3:37
5.	"I'm Starting Over"	Kix Brooks, John Wesley Ryles, Mark Sherrill	3:27
6.	"Love Is Burnin'"	Donny Kees, Frank J. Myers	2:55
7.	"Not That I Care"	Cindy Walker	2:43
8.	"Oh, Pretty Woman"	William Dees, Roy Orbison	2:51
9.	"I Meant Every Word He Said"	Joe Chambers, Bucky Jones, Curly Putman	3:00
10.	"I Still Love You"	Ricky Van Shelton	4:08
11.	"Sweet Memories" (duet with Brenda Lee)	Mickey Newbury	3:21
Total length:			34:22

== Personnel ==
- Eddie Bayers - drums
- Barry Beckett - piano
- Larry Byrom - acoustic guitar
- Mark Casstevens - acoustic guitar
- Paul Franklin - steel guitar
- Steve Gibson - electric guitar, mandolin
- Tommy Hannum - steel guitar
- David Hungate - bass guitar on "Sweet Memories"
- Roy Huskey, Jr. - upright bass
- Brenda Lee - vocals on "Sweet Memories"
- Randy McCormick - piano
- Joey Miskulin - accordion
- Farrell Morris - vibes
- Louis Dean Nunley - background vocals
- Mark O'Connor - fiddle
- Tom Robb - bass guitar
- John Wesley Ryles - background vocals
- Lisa Silver - background vocals
- Ricky Van Shelton - acoustic guitar, lead vocals
- Tommy Wells - drums
- Bergen White - background vocals
- Dennis Wilson - background vocals

== Charts ==
=== Weekly charts ===
Chart (1990)	Peak position
US Billboard 200	53
US Top Country Albums (Billboard)	1

=== Year-end charts ===
Chart (1990)	Position
US Top Country Albums (Billboard)	6
Chart (1991)	Position
US Top Country Albums (Billboard)	16

== Certifications ==
Region	Certification	Certified units/sales
Canada (Music Canada)	Gold	50,000^{^}
United States (RIAA)	Platinum	1,000,000^{^}
^{^} Shipments figures based on certification alone.
