= Wild-Eyed Dream (song) =

Single by Ricky Van Shelton

from the album Wild-Eyed Dream
- B-side: "Think It Over"
- Released: November 1986
- Genre: Country
- Length: 2:49
- Label: Columbia
- Songwriter(s): Alan Rhody
- Producer(s): Steve Buckingham

Ricky Van Shelton singles chronology
"Wild-Eyed Dream" (1986)	"Crime of Passion" (1987)

"Wild-Eyed Dream" is the debut song recorded by American country music artist Ricky Van Shelton. It was released in November 1986 as the first single and title track from the album Wild-Eyed Dream. The song reached #24 on the Billboard Hot Country Singles & Tracks chart. The song was written by Alan Rhody.

== Chart performance ==
Chart (1986–1987)	Peak position
US Hot Country Songs (Billboard)	24
Canadian RPM Country Tracks	42
