= Stranger Things Have Happened (Ronnie Milsap album) =

Studio album by Ronnie Milsap
- Released: February 28, 1989
- Recorded: 1988
- Studios: GroundStar Laboratories (Nashville, Tennessee)
- Genre: Country
- Length: 35:00
- Label: RCA Records
- Producers: Rob Galbraith; Ronnie Milsap; Tom Collins

Ronnie Milsap chronology
Heart and Soul (1987)	Stranger Things Have Happened (1989)	Back to the Grindstone (1991)

Singles from Stranger Things Have Happened
- 1. "Don't You Ever Get Tired (Of Hurting Me)" Released: October 1988; 2. "Houston Solution" Released: April 29, 1989; 3. "A Woman in Love" Released: September 23, 1989; 4. "Stranger Things Have Happened" Released: February 10, 1990

Stranger Things Have Happened is the nineteenth studio album by American country music artist Ronnie Milsap, released in 1989. The album produced four singles, two of which claimed the top spot on the Billboard country singles chart, including "A Woman in Love" and "Don't You Ever Get Tired (Of Hurting Me)." The other singles, included "Houston Solution" and the title track, which peaked at #4 and #2 respectively. Of especial note is the song "You Snap Your Fingers (And I'm Back in Your Hands)", which made an appearance once before in his career on his album from 13 years prior.

Stranger Things Have Happened reached #20 on Country album charts.

== Track listing ==
No.	Title	Writer(s)	Length
1.	"Stranger Things Have Happened"	Roger Murrah, Keith Stegall	3:13
2.	"Don't You Ever Get Tired (Of Hurting Me)"	Hank Cochran	3:05
3.	"A Woman in Love"	Doug Millett, Curtis Wright	3:15
4.	"You Snap Your Fingers (And I'm Back in Your Hands)"	John Schweers	3:27
5.	"Starting Today"	Murrah, Stegall	2:40
6.	"Roll the Dice"	Larry Boone, Paul Nelson	5:03
7.	"I Feel Like I'm Cheating on You"	Troy Seals, Eddie Setser	3:51
8.	"I Never Expected to See You"	Ronnie Milsap, Don Schlitz	3:19
9.	"Houston Solution"	Paul Overstreet, Schlitz	3:28
10.	"Southern Roots"	Rob Galbraith, Naomi Martin, Archie Jordan	3:39

== Personnel ==
- Ronnie Milsap – lead vocals, acoustic piano, electric piano
- Hargus "Pig" Robbins – acoustic piano, electric piano
- Jay Spell – acoustic piano, electric piano
- Mitch Humphries – synthesizers
- Shane Keister – synthesizers
- Mark Casstevens – acoustic guitar
- Don Potter – acoustic guitar
- Billy Joe Walker Jr. – acoustic guitar
- Bruce Dees – electric guitar, backing vocals
- Steve Gibson – electric guitar
- Reggie Young – electric guitar
- Paul Franklin – pedabro
- Bruce E. Brooks – steel guitar
- Weldon Myrick – steel guitar
- Warren Gowers – bass
- Mike Leech – bass
- Bob Wray – bass
- Eddie Bayers – drums
- Larrie Londin – drums
- Mark O'Connor – fiddle
- Carol Chase – backing vocals
- Cindy Richardson-Walker – backing vocals
- Lisa Silver – backing vocals
- Dennis Wilson – backing vocals

=== Production ===
- Joe Galante – A&R direction
- Tom Collins – producer
- Rob Galbraith – producer
- Ronnie Milsap – producer
- Ben Harris – engineer, track recording, overdub recording, mixing
- Kyle Lehning – mixing
- Randy Gardner – assistant engineer, mix assistant
- Keith Odle – assistant engineer, mix assistant
- Milan Bogdan – digital editing
- Glenn Meadows – mastering
- Masterfonics (Nashville, Tennessee) – editing and mastering location
- Linda Bres – session coordinator
- Mary Hamilton – art direction, design
- Jim "Señor" McGuire – photography
- Joyce Milsap – hair, make-up
- Bev Riedel-Patterson – hair, make-up

== Chart performance ==
=== Album ===
Chart (1989)	Peak position
U.S. Billboard Top Country Albums	20
Canadian RPM Country Albums	20

=== Singles ===
Year	Single	Peak positions	
Year	Single	US Country	CAN Country
1989	"Don't You Ever Get Tired (Of Hurting Me)"	1	*
1989	"Houston Solution"	4	12
1989	"A Woman in Love"	1	1
1990	"Stranger Things Have Happened"	2	1
