= Since I Don't Have You =

1958 single by the Skyliners

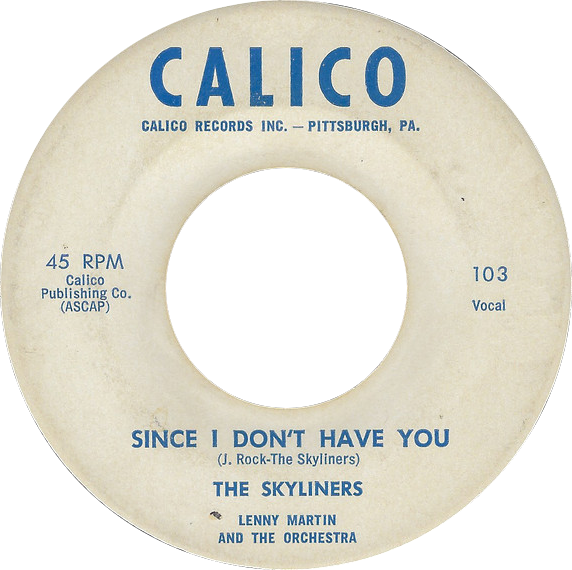
- One of pressings of the US single

Single by the Skyliners
- B-side: "One Night, One Night"
- Released: December 1958
- Recorded: 1958
- Genre: Doo-wop
- Length: 2:40
- Label: Calico
- Songwriters: Jackie Taylor; James Beaumont; Janet Vogel; Joseph Rock; Joe Verscharen; Lennie Martin; Wally Lester
- Producer: Joseph Rock

The Skyliners singles chronology
"Since I Don't Have You" (1958)	"This I Swear" (1959)

"Since I Don't Have You" is a song written and composed by Jackie Taylor, James Beaumont, Janet Vogel, Joseph Rock, Joe Verscharen, Lennie Martin, and Wally Lester. It was first a 1958 hit single for the doo-wop group the Skyliners on the US Billboard Hot 100. Country music singer Ronnie Milsap had a hit with the song in 1991. American hard rock band Guns N' Roses also had some success in 1994 with their version of the song which reached the top 10 on the UK Singles Chart.

== The Skyliners version ==
=== Background ===
Taken from their self-titled album and released in late 1958, the single reached number 12 on the US Billboard Hot 100 chart and number seven on the Cash Box Top 100. It was also a top five hit on the 1959 R&B chart.

=== Charts ===
Weekly chart (1959)	Peak position
US Billboard Hot 100	12
US Hot R&B Sides (Billboard)	3
US Cash Box Top 100	7

Year-end chart (1959)	Rank
US Billboard Hot 100	65
US Cash Box Top 100	41

== Don McLean version ==
"Since I Don't Have You"

Single by Don McLean

from the album Chain Lightning
- B-side: "Your Cheatin' Heart"
- Released: April 1981
- Genre: Easy listening
- Length: 2:32
- Label: Millennium
- Songwriters: Jackie Taylor; James Beaumont; Janet Vogel; Joseph Rock; Joe Verscharen; Lennie Martin; Wally Lester
- Producer: Larry Butler

Don McLean singles chronology
"Crying" (1980)	"Since I Don't Have You" (1981)	"It's Just the Sun" (1981)

Don McLean's 1981 rendition reached number 23 on the US Billboard Hot 100 and number six on the Adult Contemporary chart. In Canada, it peaked at number two on its AC chart.

=== Charts ===
Chart (1981)	Peak position
Canada Top Singles (RPM)	45
Canada Adult Contemporary (RPM)	2
US Billboard Hot 100	23
US Adult Contemporary (Billboard)	6
US Country (Billboard)	68
US Cash Box Top 100	28

== Ronnie Milsap version ==
"Since I Don't Have You"

Single by Ronnie Milsap

from the album Back to the Grindstone
- B-side: "I Ain't Gonna Cry No More"
- Released: July 13, 1991
- Genre: Country
- Length: 4:10
- Label: RCA
- Songwriters: Jackie Taylor; James Beaumont; Janet Vogel; Joseph Rock; Joe Verscharen; Lennie Martin; Wally Lester
- Producers: Ronnie Milsap; Rob Galbraith; Richard Landis

Ronnie Milsap singles chronology
"Are You Lovin' Me Like I'm Lovin' You" (1991)	"Since I Don't Have You" (1991)	"Turn That Radio On" (1991)

=== Background ===
Country music artist Ronnie Milsap's version was a number six hit on the US Billboard Hot Country Singles & Tracks chart in 1991. The single was taken from his album Back to the Grindstone, released on RCA Nashville. It was produced by Milsap, Rob Galbraith, and Richard Landis.

=== Charts ===
==== Weekly charts ====
Weekly chart (1991)	Peak position
Canada Country Singles (RPM)	7
US Adult Contemporary (Billboard)	25
US Hot Country Songs (Billboard)	6

==== Year-end charts ====
Year-end chart (1991)	Rank
Canada Country Tracks (RPM)	84
US Country Songs (Billboard)	67

== Guns N' Roses version ==
"Since I Don't Have You"
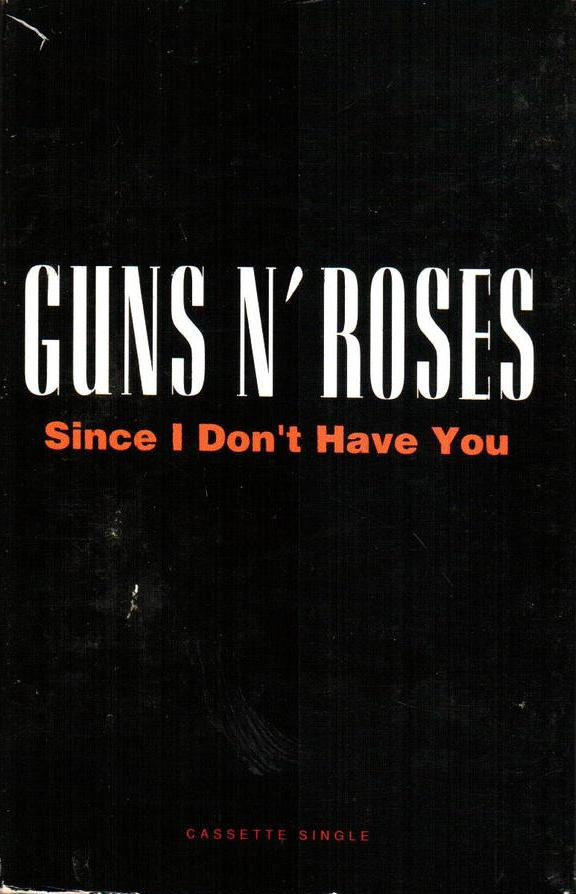
- Standard artwork (commercial US/UK cassette single pictured)

Single by Guns N' Roses

from the album "The Spaghetti Incident?"
- B-side: "You Can't Put Your Arms Around a Memory" (LP version)
- Released: February 1994
- Length: 4:20
- Label: Geffen
- Producer: Guns N' Roses

Guns N' Roses singles chronology
"Estranged" (1993)	"Since I Don't Have You" (1994)	"Sympathy for the Devil" (1994)

Music video
- "Since I Don't Have You" on YouTube

=== Background ===
The song was covered by rock band Guns N' Roses for their fifth studio album, "The Spaghetti Incident?" (1993), and was released as the album's second single. It was released in early 1994, reaching No. 61 and 69 on the US Cash Box Top 100 and Billboard Hot 100 charts, and entering the top 10 in the UK. The music video features actor Gary Oldman – then a popular casting choice for Hollywood villains – as a smiling demon who is constantly mocking singer Axl Rose. The video was the last to feature original members Duff McKagan and Slash as well as drummer Matt Sorum and rhythm guitarist Gilby Clarke.

=== Critical reception ===
Larry Flick from Billboard magazine wrote, "Here to compete with the successful 'Estranged' (taken from the Use Your Illusion opus) is this swaying cover of the Skyliners' pop classic. Guns N' Roses, with its own inimitable slash'n'burn delivery, leaves its marks all over it. All would be fine if only Axl could just once refrain from launching his voice into earsplitting, upper-octave shrilling. But hey, that's what makes 'em Guns N' Roses, right?"

=== Personnel ===
- W. Axl Rose – lead vocals, keyboards
- Slash – lead guitar
- Duff McKagan – bass
- Matt Sorum – drums
- Dizzy Reed – piano
- Gilby Clarke – acoustic guitar

=== Charts ===
==== Weekly charts ====
Chart (1993–1994)	Peak position
Australia (ARIA)	47
Canada Top Singles (RPM)	20
Europe (Eurochart Hot 100)	35
Europe (European Hit Radio)	23
France (SNEP)	28
Iceland (Íslenski Listinn Topp 40)	1
Ireland (IRMA)	16
Israel (Israeli Singles Chart)	23
New Zealand (Recorded Music NZ)	48
Scottish Singles Sales (Official Charts)	26
Sweden (Sverigetopplistan)	40
UK Singles (Official Charts)	10
UK Airplay (Music Week)	11
US Billboard Hot 100	69
US Cash Box Top 100	61

==== Year-end charts ====
Chart (1994)	Position
Iceland (Íslenski Listinn Topp 40)	20
UK Singles (OCC)	136

=== Release history ===
Region	Date	Format(s)	Label(s)	Ref.
United States	February 1994	7-inch vinyl; cassette	Geffen	
Europe	March 1994	CD	Geffen	
Australia	March 7, 1994	CD; cassette	Geffen	
Japan	April 21, 1994	CD	Geffen	
United Kingdom	May 23, 1994	CD; cassette	Geffen	

== Other notable versions ==
- In 1964, Chuck Jackson went to No. 47 on the Hot 100 with his recording.
- Lou Christie reached No. 71 in Canada with his version, December 12, 1966.
- Jay and the Americans remade "Since I Don't Have You" for their April 1969 Sands of Time album release, their rendition serving as B-side for their Top Ten single "This Magic Moment" released November 1968.
- The Vogues remade "Since I Don't Have You" for their 1968 album release Memories: the track would also be included on the 1970 album release The Vogues Sing the Good Old Songs and Other Hits from which it was issued as a fourth single in December 1970 to reach #8 on the Billboard Easy Listening hit ranking, marking the Vogues last Top Ten appearance on a national chart.
- Art Garfunkel reached No. 38 on the UK singles chart in July 1979 with his cover, while peaking at No. 53 on the Billboard Hot 100 and No. 5 on the adult contemporary chart in the US.
