= Houston Solution =

Single by Ronnie Milsap

from the album Stranger Things Have Happened
- B-side: "If You Don't Want Me To"
- Released: April 29, 1989
- Genre: Country
- Length: 3:25
- Label: RCA Records
- Songwriters: Paul Overstreet, Don Schlitz
- Producers: Ronnie Milsap, Rob Galbraith, Tom Collins

Ronnie Milsap singles chronology
"Don't You Ever Get Tired (Of Hurting Me)" (1989)	"Houston Solution" (1989)	"A Woman in Love" (1989)

"Houston Solution" is a song written by Paul Overstreet and Don Schlitz, and recorded by American country music artist Ronnie Milsap. It was released in April 1989 as the second single from the album Stranger Things Have Happened. The song reached #4 on the Billboard Hot Country Singles & Tracks chart.

== Chart performance ==
Chart (1989)	Peak position
Canada Country Singles (RPM)	12
US Hot Country Songs (Billboard)	4

=== Year-end charts ===
Chart (1989)	Position
US Country Songs (Billboard)	50
