= Turn That Radio On =

Single by Ronnie Milsap

from the album Back to the Grindstone
- B-side: "Old Habits Are Hard to Break"
- Released: December 7, 1991
- Genre: Country
- Length: 3:42
- Label: RCA
- Songwriters: Paul Davis, Archie Jordan
- Producers: Ronnie Milsap, Rob Galbraith

Ronnie Milsap singles chronology
"Since I Don't Have You" (1991)	"Turn That Radio On" (1991)	"All Is Fair in Love and War" (1992)

"Turn That Radio On" is a song written by Paul Davis and Archie Jordan, and recorded by American country music artist Ronnie Milsap. It was released in December 1991 as the third single from the album Back to the Grindstone. The song reached No. 4 on the Billboard Hot Country Singles & Tracks chart, his last Top 10 hit.

== Chart performance ==
Chart (1991–1992)	Peak position
Canada Country Singles (RPM)	2
US Hot Country Songs (Billboard)	4

=== Year-end charts ===
Chart (1992)	Position
Canada Country Tracks (RPM)	31
US Country Songs (Billboard)	67
