= The Fabulous Charlie Rich =

Studio album by Charlie Rich
- Released: 1969
- Recorded: December 15, 1967 – September 18, 1969
- Genre: Country
- Length: 33:19
- Label: Epic
- Producer: Billy Sherrill

Charlie Rich chronology
A Lonely Weekend (1969)	The Fabulous Charlie Rich (1969)	Boss Man (1970)

Singles from The Fabulous Charlie Rich
- 1. "Raggedy Ann" Released: July 15, 1968; 2. "Life's Little Ups and Downs" Released: June 27, 1969

Professional ratings
Review scores
Source	Rating
AllMusic	5/5 stars
Christgau's Record Guide	A−
The Rolling Stone Record Guide	5/5 stars

The Fabulous Charlie Rich is a 1969 album by country music legend Charlie Rich. In its review, AllMusic praises the album for capturing "the eclectic nature of Rich's music better than the great majority of his albums", but warns "country purists" that producer Billy Sherrill's production may make it less to their tastes. In spite of launching several hit singles, the album was not a widespread commercial success. The album has, however, been critically well received, warmly praised by a number of reviewers including Rolling Stone, who gave the album "five stars", and Robert Christgau who asserted that "I never took Charlie's could-been-Elvis rep very seriously until I heard the passionately confident Jimmy Reed medley that opens side two of this Nashville album".

== Hit singles ==
The album launched three charting singles. "Raggedy Ann" and "Life Has Its Little Ups and Downs" ranked at #45 and #41 on Billboard's "Country Singles" chart, while "July 12, 1939" established cross-over success, reaching #47 on "Country Singles" and #85 on "Pop Singles". Ricky Van Shelton released a cover of "Life's Little Ups and Downs" in 1990, taking the song to #4 on the country charts.

== Track listing ==
1. "I Almost Lost My Mind" (Ivory Joe Hunter) – 2:36
2. "Life Has Its Little Ups and Downs" (Margaret Ann Rich) – 3:40
3. "San Francisco Is a Lonely Town" (Ben Peters) – 3:31
4. "Sittin' and Thinkin'" (Charlie Rich) – 3:01
5. "July 12, 1939" (Norro Wilson) – 4:29
6. "Bright Lights, Big City" (Jimmy Reed) – 2:44
7. "Raggedy Ann" (A. L. Owens) – 2:37
8. "Have You Ever Been Lonely (Have You Ever Been Blue?)" (Billy Hill, Peter De Rose) – 2:26
9. "A Picture of You" (Ted Harris) – 2:45
10. "Love Waits for Me" (Dallas Frazier) – 2:29
11. "It Makes Me Want to Cry" (Dick Heard, Eddie Rabbitt, Van Trevor) – 3:01
