= Crime of Passion (Ricky Van Shelton song) =

Single by Ricky Van Shelton

from the album Wild-Eyed Dream
- B-side: "Don't We All Have the Right"
- Released: April 18, 1987
- Genre: Country
- Length: 3:23
- Label: Columbia Nashville
- Songwriter(s): Mac McAnally; Walt Aldridge
- Producer(s): Steve Buckingham

Ricky Van Shelton singles chronology
"Wild-Eyed Dream" (1986)	"Crime of Passion" (1987)	"Somebody Lied" (1987)

"Crime of Passion" is a song written by Walt Aldridge and Mac McAnally, and recorded by American country music singer Ricky Van Shelton. It was released in April 1987 as the second single from his debut album Wild-Eyed Dream. The song spent nineteen weeks on the Hot Country Singles charts, where it peaked at number 7. Its b-side, "Don't We All Have the Right," was released in 1988 as the album's fifth single.

== Content ==
The song's main plot – a drifter who conspires with a young woman to rob a gas station – serves as a metaphor for a man who falls hard for a woman with sinister hidden motives: in this case, a failed love affair with a seductress, who leaves her target to the wolves after he serves her purposes.

In the song's first verse, the drifter is picked up by a beautiful young woman driving a Cadillac Eldorado convertible, along a desert highway. After the two begin talking and the man explains his situation (he's unemployed and broke), the woman suggests finding a place to rob. The man enters the gas station and follows through with the plan, netting a large cache of cash in the process.

Later, as the two are counting the cash and celebrating their success, the convertible is pulled over by an unmarked police car. The woman professes her innocence and immediately points at the man as the armed robbery suspect. It is later explained that the woman's soon-to-be ex-husband is the gas station owner who – as a favor to her – refuses to implicate her, leaving the drifter to take the fall alone.

Throughout the song, vivid descriptions of the objects in the song are written into the lyrics. These include the names of key people in the song (gas station owner Jim, whose name is sewn on his shirt; and Joe, the police officer whose name is written on his badge); the Eldorado convertible with "tuck and roll pleat" vinyl upholstery; and the unmarked Chevy Nova police car.

== Chart performance ==
Chart (1987)	Peak position
US Hot Country Songs (Billboard)	7
Canadian RPM Country Tracks	5
