= Stranger Things Have Happened (song) =

Single by Ronnie Milsap

from the album Stranger Things Have Happened
- B-side: "Southern Roots"
- Released: February 10, 1990
- Genre: Country
- Length: 3:04
- Label: RCA Records
- Songwriters: Roger Murrah, Keith Stegall
- Producers: Ronnie Milsap, Rob Galbraith, Tom Collins

Ronnie Milsap singles chronology
"A Woman in Love" (1989)	"Stranger Things Have Happened" (1990)	"Are You Lovin' Me Like I'm Lovin' You" (1991)

"Stranger Things Have Happened" is a song written by Roger Murrah and Keith Stegall, and recorded by American country music artist Ronnie Milsap. It was released in February 1990 as the fourth single and title track from the album Stranger Things Have Happened. The song reached #2 on the Billboard Hot Country Singles & Tracks chart.

== Chart performance ==
Chart (1990)	Peak position
Canada Country Singles (RPM)	1
US Hot Country Songs (Billboard)	2

=== Year-end charts ===
Chart (1990)	Position
Canada Country Tracks (RPM)	36
US Country Songs (Billboard)	21
