= Bobby G. Rice =

American singer-songwriter

- Born: Robert Gene Rice; July 11, 1944 (age 81)
- Origin: Boscobel, Wisconsin, United States
- Genres: Country
- Occupation: Singer-songwriter
- Instrument(s): Vocals, guitar
- Years active: 1970–1988
- Labels: Royal American, Metromedia, GRT, Sunbird, Audiograph, Door Knob

Robert Gene Rice (born July 11, 1944, in Boscobel, Wisconsin, United States) is an American country music singer-songwriter, known professionally as Bobby G. Rice. Between 1970 and 1988, Rice released nine albums and charted thirty songs on the Billboard Hot Country Singles chart. His biggest hit, "You Lay So Easy On My Mind," peaked at Number 3 in 1973.

== Discography ==
=== Albums ===
Year	Album	US Country	Label
1972	Hit After Hit	—	Royal American
1973	You Lay So Easy on My Mind	7	Metromedia
1974	She Sure Laid the Lonelies On Me	43	GRT
1975	Write Me a Letter	43	GRT
1976	Instant Rice: The Best of Bobby G.	41	GRT
1976	With Love	—	GRT
1981	The Best of Bobby G. Rice	—	Sunbird Records
1982	Bobby's Back	—	Audiograph
1985	A New Beginning	—	Door Knob

=== Singles ===
Year	Single	Chart Positions		Album
Year	Single	US Country	CAN Country	Album
1970	"Sugar Shack"	32	—	Hit After Hit
1970	"Hey Baby"	35	—	Hit After Hit
1971	"Lover Please"	46	—	Hit After Hit
1971	"Mountain of Love"	20	—	Hit After Hit
1972	"Suspicion"	33	—	Hit After Hit
1973	"You Lay So Easy On My Mind"	3	7	You Lay So Easy on My Mind
1973	"You Give Me You"	8	8	You Lay So Easy on My Mind
1973	"The Whole World's Making Love Again Tonight"	13	38	She Sure Laid the Lonelies On Me
1974	"Make It Feel Like Love Again"	30	—	Write Me a Letter
1975	"Write Me a Letter"	9	13	Write Me a Letter
1975	"Freda Comes, Freda Goes"	10	17	Write Me a Letter
1975	"I May Never Be Your Lover (But I'll Always Be Your Friend)"	64	—	Instant Rice: The Best of Bobby G.
1976	"Pick Me Up On Your Way Down"	35	—	Instant Rice: The Best of Bobby G.
1976	"You Are My Special Angel"	53	—	With Love
1976	"Woman Stealer"	54	—	With Love
1977	"Just One Kiss Magdelena"	66	—	singles only
1978	"Whisper It to Me"	57	—	singles only
1978	"The Softest Touch in Town"	30	53	singles only
1979	"(Oh Baby Mine) I Get So Lonely"	49	—	singles only
1979	"You Make It So Easy"	67	—	The Best of Bobby G. Rice
1980	"The Man Who Takes You Home"	53	—	The Best of Bobby G. Rice
1981	"Livin' Together (Lovin' Apart)"	86	—	single only
1981	"Pardon My French"	63	—	Bobby's Back
1985	"New Tradition"	95	—	A New Beginning
1986	"Red Neck and Over Thirty" (w/ Wayne Kemp)	70	—	singles only
1986	"You've Taken Over My Heart"	70	—	singles only
1987	"Rachel's Room"	85	—	singles only
1987	"You Lay So Easy On My Mind" (re-recording)	79	—	singles only
1988	"A Night of Love Forgotten"	70	—	singles only
1988	"Clean Livin' Folk" (w/ Perry LaPointe)	76	—	singles only
