= All Is Fair in Love and War (song) =

Single by Ronnie Milsap

from the album Back to the Grindstone
- B-side: "Back to the Grindstone"
- Released: February 1992
- Genre: Country
- Length: 4:07
- Label: RCA
- Songwriters: Tim Nichols; Robert Byrne
- Producers: Ronnie Milsap; Rob Galbraith

Ronnie Milsap singles chronology
"Turn That Radio On" (1991)	"All Is Fair in Love and War" (1992)	"L.A. to the Moon" (1992)

"All Is Fair in Love and War" is a song written by Tim Nichols and Robert Byrne, and recorded by American country music artist Ronnie Milsap. It was released in February 1992 as the fourth single from his album Back to the Grindstone. The song reached No. 11 on the Billboard Hot Country Singles & Tracks chart in June 1992.

== Chart performance ==
Chart (1992)	Peak position
Canada Country Singles (RPM)	13
US Hot Country Songs (Billboard)	11
