= Hole in My Pocket =

Single by Ricky Van Shelton

from the album Loving Proof
- B-side: "Let Me Live With Love (And Die with You)"
- Released: March 1989
- Genre: Country
- Length: 2:32
- Label: Columbia Nashville (38-68694)
- Songwriters: Boudleaux Bryant & Felice Bryant
- Producer: Steve Buckingham

Ricky Van Shelton singles chronology
"From a Jack to a King" (1988)	"Hole in My Pocket" (1989)	"Living Proof" (1989)

"Hole in My Pocket" is a song co-written by Boudleaux and Felice Bryant, and recorded by American country music artist Ricky Van Shelton. It was released in March 1989, as the third single from his album Loving Proof. The song reached number 4 on the Billboard Hot Country Singles & Tracks chart and became a number 1 hit in Canada. Shelton's version was an updated rendition of the original recording by Grand Ole Opry artist Little Jimmy Dickens, recorded in Nashville on April 16, 1958 with a small group of Nashville session players including guitarists Grady Martin and Harold Bradley. Though Dickens was known for his earthy hard country songs, this one was a hard rocker in the Chuck Berry mode. While the Dickens version was not a hit, Shelton's recording, despite some modern touches, closely followed the 1958 arrangement.

== Content ==
The narrator has a hole in his pocket so all his money is gone and he can't buy his girlfriend anything.

== Chart performance ==
"Hole in My Pocket" reached number 4 on the Billboard Hot Country Songs chart and number 1 on the Canadian RPM Country Tracks chart.

Chart (1989)	Peak position
Canada Country Singles (RPM)	1
US Hot Country Songs (Billboard)	4

=== Year-end charts ===
Chart (1989)	Position
Canada Country Tracks (RPM)	46
US Country Songs (Billboard)	76
