= I Meant Every Word He Said =

Single by Ricky Van Shelton

from the album RVS III
- B-side: "Sometimes I Cry In My Sleep"
- Released: June 25, 1990
- Genre: Country
- Length: 3:00
- Label: Columbia Nashville 73413
- Songwriters: Joe Chambers, Bucky Jones, Curly Putman
- Producer: Steve Buckingham

Ricky Van Shelton singles chronology
"I've Cried My Last Tear for You" (1990)	"I Meant Every Word He Said" (1990)	"Life's Little Ups and Downs" (1990)

"I Meant Every Word He Said" is a song written by Joe Chambers, Bucky Jones and Curly Putman, and recorded by American country music artist Ricky Van Shelton. It was released in June 1990 as the third single from the album RVS III. It peaked at No. 2 on the Billboard Hot Country Songs chart and reached No. 1 on the Canadian RPM country singles chart.

== Chart performance ==
Chart (1990)	Peak position
Canada Country Singles (RPM)	1
US Hot Country Songs (Billboard)	2

=== Year-end charts ===
Chart (1990)	Position
Canada Country Tracks (RPM)	9
US Country Songs (Billboard)	26
