= A Woman in Love (Ronnie Milsap song) =

- Cassette single cover art

Single by Ronnie Milsap

from the album Stranger Things Have Happened
- B-side: "Starting Today"
- Released: September 23, 1989
- Genre: Country, pop
- Length: 3:16
- Label: RCA Records
- Songwriters: Doug Millett; Curtis Wright
- Producers: Tom Collins; Ronnie Milsap; Rob Galbraith

Ronnie Milsap singles chronology
"Houston Solution" (1989)	"A Woman in Love" (1989)	"Stranger Things Have Happened" (1990)

"A Woman in Love" is a song written by Curtis Wright and Doug Millett, and recorded by American country music singer Ronnie Milsap. It was released in September 1989 as the third single from the album Stranger Things Have Happened. It was his last song to reach number one on the U.S. country singles chart.

== Success and reception ==
"A Woman in Love" was Milsap's 53rd single to be released and the third track from the album Stranger Things Have Happened, the song became his last number-one single, which was accompanied by a music video for the song.

Curtis Wright, who had just quit Vern Gosdin's road band, wrote the song in 1989. He said that when Doug Millett presented him with the idea, he was initially uninterested in writing the song, but "it kind of opened up like a book". Wright was still concerned that its hook was too similar to Earl Thomas Conley's 1988 single "What She Is (Is a Woman in Love)", and thought that the song was not suited for Milsap's style.

"A Woman In Love" is often considered to be one of Milsap's biggest hit singles. One thing backing this claim was its status during Billboard magazine's experimental process of compiling unpublished prototype charts using the Nielsen Broadcast Data Systems, which would lead to an increase in the length of time songs spent in the top spot. Billboard began this experimental process in November 1989, when "A Woman In Love" was at its popularity peak on the radio; during this time, instead of the single week which it achieved on the published listing, the unpublished charts showed "A Woman In love" spending five weeks atop the prototype charts.

== Chart positions ==
Chart (1989–1990)	Peak position
Canada Country Singles (RPM)	1
US Hot Country Songs (Billboard)	1

=== Year-end charts ===
Chart (1990)	Position
Canada Country Tracks (RPM)	89
US Country Songs (Billboard)	38
