= I'll Leave This World Loving You =

Single by Ricky Van Shelton

from the album Loving Proof
- B-side: "Sometimes I Cry Myself to Sleep"
- Released: August 14, 1988
- Recorded: January 19, 1988
- Genre: Country
- Length: 3:06
- Label: Columbia Nashville
- Songwriter(s): Wayne Kemp and Mack Vickery
- Producer(s): Steve Buckingham

Ricky Van Shelton singles chronology
"Don't We All Have the Right" (1988)	"I'll Leave This World Loving You" (1988)	"From a Jack to a King" (1988)

"I'll Leave This World Loving You" is a country music song written by Wayne Kemp and Mack Vickery. Kemp released it in 1980 on the Mercury Records label. He had previously recorded the song in 1974 for MCA Records, and used this version as the B-side to his 1974 single "Harlan County".

The song was covered by Ronnie Milsap in 1975, on the album A Legend in My Time and by Mel Street on his 1977 self-titled album.

The song was later covered by Ricky Van Shelton in 1988. It was released in August 1988 as the lead-off single from his album Loving Proof. It was the fourth consecutive Number One single of Shelton's career, as well as his first multi-week Number One.

== Chart positions ==
=== Wayne Kemp ===
Chart (1980)	Peak position
US Hot Country Songs (Billboard)	47

=== Ricky Van Shelton ===
Chart (1988)	Peak position
US Hot Country Songs (Billboard)	1
Canadian RPM Country Tracks	1

=== Year-end charts ===
Chart (1988)	Position
US Hot Country Songs (Billboard)	60
