= I've Cried My Last Tear for You =

"I've Cried My Last Tear For You"

Single by Ricky Van Shelton

from the album RVS III
- B-side: "I Still Love You"
- Released: February 27, 1990
- Recorded: May 16, 1988
- Genre: Country
- Length: 2:29
- Label: Columbia Nashville
- Songwriters: Tony King, Chris Waters
- Producer: Steve Buckingham

Ricky Van Shelton singles chronology
"Statue of a Fool" (1989)	"I've Cried My Last Tear For You" (1990)	"I Meant Every Word He Said" (1990)

"I've Cried My Last Tear for You" is a song written by Chris Waters and Tony King, and recorded by American country music singer Ricky Van Shelton. It was released in February 1990 as the second single from his album RVS III. The song became Shelton's seventh number-one single on the Billboard Hot Country Singles & Tracks (now Hot Country Songs) chart.

== Chart positions ==
Chart (1990)	Peak position
Canada Country Singles (RPM)	1
US Hot Country Songs (Billboard)	1

=== Year-end charts ===
Chart (1990)	Position
Canada Country Tracks (RPM)	10
US Country Songs (Billboard)	6
