= Don't We All Have the Right =

Single by Ricky Van Shelton

from the album Wild-Eyed Dream
- B-side: "Baby, I'm Ready"
- Released: April 11, 1988
- Recorded: October 15, 1986
- Genre: Country
- Length: 2:36
- Label: Columbia Nashville
- Songwriter(s): Roger Miller
- Producer(s): Steve Buckingham

Ricky Van Shelton singles chronology
"Life Turned Her That Way" (1987)	"Don't We All Have the Right" (1988)	"I'll Leave This World Loving You" (1988)

"Don't We All Have the Right" is a song written and recorded by Roger Miller in 1970 and featured on his album, Trip in the Country, released as a double A-side with "South." It was later recorded by Ricky Van Shelton. It was first the b-side to his second single "Crime of Passion" before it served as the fifth and last single released from his debut album, Wild-Eyed Dream in 1988. The song was Shelton's 3rd #1 hit on the Billboard Hot Country Singles & Tracks (now Hot Country Songs) chart as well as his third consecutive #1.

== Content ==
The narrator finds out he's wrong when he thinks his lover will return after leaving him.

== Chart performance ==
"Don't We All Have the Right" reached #1 on the Billboard Hot Country Songs chart and on The Canadian RPM Country Tracks chart. His second single to do so.

=== Weekly charts ===
Chart (1988)	Peak position
US Hot Country Songs (Billboard)	1
Canadian RPM Country Tracks	1

=== Year-end charts ===
Chart (1988)	Position
US Hot Country Songs (Billboard)	24
