= Wild-Eyed Dream =

Studio album by Ricky Van Shelton
- Released: February 26, 1987; October 25, 1990 (re-released)
- Recorded: July – October 1986
- Genre: Country
- Length: 29:04
- Label: Columbia Nashville
- Producer: Steve Buckingham

Ricky Van Shelton chronology
Wild-Eyed Dream (1987)	Loving Proof (1988)

Singles from Wild-Eyed Dream
- 1. "Wild-Eyed Dream" Released: November 1986; 2. "Crime of Passion" Released: April 18, 1987; 3. "Somebody Lied" Released: July 27, 1987; 4. "Life Turned Her That Way" Released: December 7, 1987; 5. "Don't We All Have the Right" Released: April 11, 1988

Professional ratings
Review scores
Source	Rating
Allmusic	3/5 stars

Wild-Eyed Dream is the debut studio album by American country music artist Ricky Van Shelton. The first singles released from the album from 1986 to 1988 were "Wild-Eyed Dream" and "Crime of Passion", which charted at #24 and #7, respectively. The last three singles, "Somebody Lied", "Life Turned Her That Way", and "Don't We All Have The Right" all reached #1. The album was certified platinum by the RIAA on July 24, 1989.

Half of the songs on the album were originally recorded by other artists. "Working Man's Blues" is a cover of the Merle Haggard song. "Life Turned Her That Way" was previously a #11 single in 1967 for Mel Tillis, and "I Don't Care" a #1 single for Buck Owens in 1964. Conway Twitty also recorded "Somebody Lied" for his 1985 album Don't Call Him a Cowboy. "Don't We All Have the Right" was originally recorded by Roger Miller on his 1970 album Trip in the Country.

"Crazy Over You" was recorded by the duo Foster & Lloyd and released in September of 1987 as their debut single.

== Track listing ==
No.	Title	Writer(s)	Length
1.	"Ultimately Fine"	Samuel Lianas, Kurt Neumann	3:07
2.	"Crime of Passion"	Walt Aldridge, Mac McAnally	3:23
3.	"Life Turned Her That Way"	Harlan Howard	3:22
4.	"I Don't Care"	Buck Owens	2:17
5.	"Don't We All Have the Right"	Roger Miller	2:36
6.	"Wild-Eyed Dream"	Alan Rhody	2:49
7.	"Baby, I'm Ready"	Floyd Wilson	2:22
8.	"Somebody Lied"	Joe Chambers, Larry Jenkins	3:21
9.	"Crazy Over You"	Radney Foster, Bill Lloyd	3:21
10.	"Workin' Man's Blues"	Merle Haggard	2:43
Total length:			29:04

== Personnel ==
- Eddie Bayers – drums
- Richard Bennett – electric guitar
- Steve Buckingham – acoustic guitar
- Mark Casstevens- acoustic guitar
- Dennis Burnside – piano
- Larry Byrom – acoustic guitar
- Paul Franklin – steel guitar
- Sonny Garrish – steel guitar
- Steve Gibson – electric guitar
- Hoot Hester – fiddle, mandolin
- David Hungate – bass guitar
- Roy Huskey, Jr. – upright bass
- Randy McCormick – piano
- Tony Migliore – piano
- Don Potter – acoustic guitar
- Tom Robb – bass guitar
- Michael Rhodes – bass guitar
- John Wesley Ryles – backing vocals
- Harry Stinson – percussion
- Ricky Van Shelton – acoustic guitar, lead vocals
- Tommy Wells – drums
- Bergen White – backing vocals
- Dennis Wilson – backing vocals

== Charts ==
=== Weekly charts ===
Chart (1987–88)	Peak position
US Billboard 200	76
US Top Country Albums (Billboard)	1

=== Year-end charts ===
Chart (1987)	Position
US Top Country Albums (Billboard)	26
Chart (1988)	Position
US Top Country Albums (Billboard)	2
Chart (1989)	Position
US Top Country Albums (Billboard)	19
Chart (1990)	Position
US Top Country Albums (Billboard)	54

== Certifications ==
Certifications for Wild-Eyed Dream
Region	Certification	Certified units/sales
Canada (Music Canada)	Gold	50,000^{^}
United States (RIAA)	Platinum	1,000,000^{^}
^{^} Shipments figures based on certification alone.
