= Don't You Ever Get Tired (Of Hurting Me) =

- Cassette single cover art

Single by Ronnie Milsap

from the album Stranger Things Have Happened
- B-side: "I Never Expected to See You"
- Released: October 1988
- Genre: Country
- Length: 3:05
- Label: RCA Records
- Songwriter: Hank Cochran
- Producers: Ronnie Milsap, Rob Galbraith, Tom Collins

Ronnie Milsap singles chronology
"Button Off My Shirt" (1988)	"Don't You Ever Get Tired (Of Hurting Me)" (1988)	"Houston Solution" (1989)

"Don't You Ever Get Tired (Of Hurting Me)" is a country song written by Hank Cochran that was a hit single for Ray Price in 1965, reaching No. 11 on the Billboard chart.

In 1980, Price re-recorded the song as a duet with Willie Nelson and released it as a single; like his solo original, the new version of "... Hurting Me" peaked at No. 11 on the Hot Country Singles chart in early 1981.

A later version by Ronnie Milsap in 1989 was Milsap's thirty-third number one single as a solo artist. The single went to number one for one week and spent a total of thirteen weeks on the chart. Other notable recordings of the song were done by Jack Greene and George Jones.

== Chart performance ==
=== Ray Price ===
Chart (1965–1966)	Peak position
US Hot Country Songs (Billboard)	11

=== Connie Cato ===
Chart (1977)	Peak position
Hot Country Songs (Billboard)	92

=== Willie Nelson & Ray Price ===
Chart (1980–1981)	Peak position
Hot Country Songs (Billboard)	11
Canadian RPM Country Tracks	8

=== Ronnie Milsap ===
Chart (1988–1989)	Peak position
US Hot Country Songs (Billboard)	1
Canadian RPM Country Tracks	2

==== Year-end charts ====
Chart (1989)	Position
Canada Country Tracks (RPM)	63
US Country Songs (Billboard)	40
