= Brian Collins (1970s singer) =

American singer-songwriter

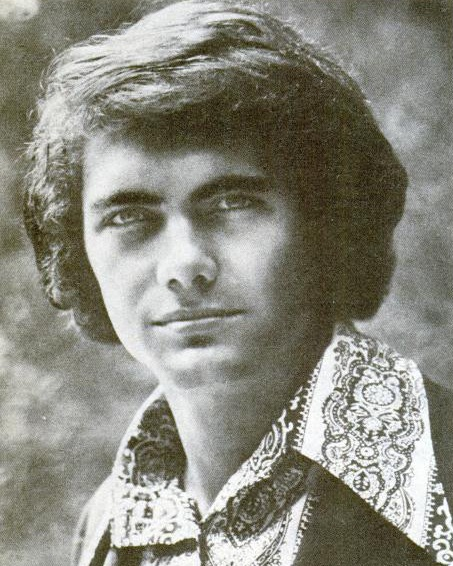

Background information
- Born: October 19, 1950 (age 75)
- Origin: Baltimore, Maryland, United States
- Occupation: Singer
- Instrument: Vocals
- Years active: 1971–1983
- Labels: Mega, ABC/Dot, RCA, Primero

Brian Collins (born October 19, 1950 in Baltimore, Maryland) is an American country music artist. Between 1973 and 1974, he recorded two albums for Dot Records. In that same time span, he charted three Top 40 singles on the Billboard country charts. His highest-charting single was a #10 cover of Jack Greene's "Statue of a Fool."

== Discography ==
=== Albums ===
Year	Album	US Country
1973	This Is Brian Collins	34
1974	That's the Way Love Should Be	—

=== Singles ===
Year	Single	Chart Positions		Album
Year	Single	US Country	CAN Country	Album
1971	"All I Want to Do Is Say I Love You"	67	—	singles only
1972	"There's a Kind of Hush (All Over the World)"	47	—	singles only
1972	"Spread It Around"	61	—	singles only
1973	"I Wish (You Had Stayed)"	24	16	This Is Brian Collins
1974	"I Don't Plan on Losing You"	43	31	This Is Brian Collins
1974	"Statue of a Fool"	10	6	This Is Brian Collins
1974	"That's the Way Love Should Be"	23	—	That's the Way Love Should Be
1975	"I'd Still Be in Love with You"	84	—	That's the Way Love Should Be
1975	"Queen of Temptation"	83	—	singles only
1976	"To Show You That I Love You"	65	—	singles only
1977	"If You Love Me (Let Me Know)"	83	—	singles only
1978	"Old Flames (Can't Hold a Candle to You)"	86	—	singles only
1979	"Hello Texas"	94	—	singles only
1982	"Before I Got to Know Her"	80	—	singles only
1983	"Nickel's Worth of Heaven"	80	—	singles only
