= Statue of a Fool =

Single by Jack Greene

from the album Statue of a Fool
- B-side: "There's More to Love"
- Released: May 10, 1969
- Genre: Country
- Length: 2:48
- Label: Decca
- Songwriter: Jan Crutchfield
- Producer: Owen Bradley

Jack Greene singles chronology
"Until My Dreams Come True" (1969)	"Statue of a Fool" (1969)	"Back in the Arms of Love" (1969)

"Statue of a Fool"

Single by Brian Collins

from the album This Is Brian Collins
- B-side: "How Can I Tell Her (About You)"
- Released: April 7, 1974
- Recorded: 1974
- Genre: Country
- Length: 3:04
- Label: Dot17499
- Songwriter: Jan Crutchfield
- Producer: Jim Foglesong

Brian Collins singles chronology
"I Don't Plan on Losing You" (1974)	"Statue of a Fool" (1974)	"That's the Way Love Should Be" (1974)

"Statue of a Fool"

Single by Ricky Van Shelton

from the album RVS III
- B-side: "He's Got You"
- Released: November 7, 1989
- Recorded: June 14, 1989
- Genre: Country
- Length: 3:04
- Label: Columbia Nashville 38-73077
- Songwriter: Jan Crutchfield
- Producer: Steve Buckingham

Ricky Van Shelton singles chronology
"Living Proof" (1989)	"Statue of a Fool" (1989)	"I've Cried My Last Tear for You" (1990)

"Statue of a Fool" is a song written by Jan Crutchfield which has been recorded by a number of country artists including Jack Greene; Brian Collins; Ricky Van Shelton; and Bill Medley, formerly of The Righteous Brothers.

== Chart performance ==
=== Jack Greene version ===
Chart (1969)	Peak position
U.S. Billboard Hot Country Songs	1
Canadian RPM Country Tracks	3

=== Brian Collins version ===
Chart (1974)	Peak position
US Hot Country Songs (Billboard)	10
Canadian RPM Country Tracks	6

=== Bill Medley version ===
Chart (1979)	Peak position
US Hot Country Songs (Billboard)	91

=== Ricky Van Shelton version ===
Chart (1989–1990)	Peak position
Canada Country Singles (RPM)	1
US Hot Country Songs (Billboard)	2

==== Year-end charts ====
Chart (1990)	Position
Canada Country Tracks (RPM)	39
US Country Songs (Billboard)	19
