= Somebody Lied =

Single by Ricky Van Shelton

from the album Wild-Eyed Dream
- B-side: "Working Man Blues"
- Released: July 27, 1987
- Recorded: July 11, 1986
- Genre: Country
- Length: 3:21
- Label: Columbia Nashville
- Songwriter(s): Joe Chambers; Larry Jenkins
- Producer(s): Steve Buckingham

Ricky Van Shelton singles chronology
"Crime of Passion" (1987)	"Somebody Lied" (1987)	"Life Turned Her That Way" (1987)

"Somebody Lied" is a country music song written by Joe Chambers and Larry Jenkins. First recorded by Conway Twitty on his 1985 album Don't Call Him a Cowboy, it was later recorded by American country music singer Ricky Van Shelton. Shelton's version was released in July 1987 as the third single from his debut album Wild-Eyed Dream, as well as Shelton's first number-one single on the Hot Country Singles and Tracks chart.

Some notable similarities exist between this version and a song titled "Funny How Time Slips Away" written by Willie Nelson and first recorded by country singer Billy Walker in 1961, and later by Elvis Presley in 1970.

== Charts ==
=== Weekly charts ===
Chart (1987)	Peak position
US Hot Country Songs (Billboard)	1
Canadian RPM Country Tracks	5

=== Year-end charts ===
Chart (1987)	Position
US Hot Country Songs (Billboard)	8
