= Life Turned Her That Way =

Song

Single by Mel Tillis

from the album Life Turned Her That Way
- B-side: "If I Could Only Start Over"
- Released: February 18, 1967
- Genre: Country
- Length: 2:18
- Label: Kapp KL-1514
- Songwriter(s): Harlan Howard

Mel Tillis singles chronology
"Stateside" (1966)	"Life Turned Her That Way" (1967)	"Goodbye Wheeling" (1967)

"Life Turned Her That Way"

Single by Ricky Van Shelton

from the album Wild-Eyed Dream
- B-side: "I Don't Care"
- Released: December 7, 1987
- Recorded: October 14, 1986
- Genre: Country
- Length: 3:22
- Label: Columbia Nashville
- Songwriter(s): Harlan Howard
- Producer(s): Steve Buckingham

Ricky Van Shelton singles chronology
"Somebody Lied" (1987)	"Life Turned Her That Way" (1987)	"Don't We All Have the Right" (1988)

"Life Turned Her That Way" is a song written by Harlan Howard and first recorded by American country music artist Little Jimmy Dickens in 1965. Mel Tillis recorded it in 1967 and released it as a single in February and was his seventh chart entry. Ricky Van Shelton would also later record it and release it as a single. It was the fourth single released from his debut album, Wild-Eyed Dream. Released in late 1987, it was his second number-one hit on the Billboard Hot Country Singles & Tracks chart in early 1988.

== Covers ==
This song was recorded by Little Jimmy Dickens (1965). In the 1960s, it was covered in 1967 by Mel Tillis and released as a single where it went to No. 11, Charley Pride (1967), George Jones (1967), James Carr (1968), Sonny Strickland (Unknown year), and Ernest Tubb (1968). Many more famous country acts would cover the song such as Sleepy LaBeef, Willie Nelson and Conway Twitty. Soul singer James Carr recorded it in 1968.

== Charts ==
=== Mel Tillis ===
Chart (1967)	Peak position
US Hot Country Songs (Billboard)	11
US Bubbling Under Hot 100 (Billboard)	28

=== Ricky Van Shelton ===
"Life Turned Her That Way" reached number one on both the Billboard Hot Country Songs chart and on the Canadian RPM Country Tracks chart. It was his first single to number one on that chart.

==== Weekly charts ====
Chart (1987–1988)	Peak position
US Hot Country Songs (Billboard)	1
Canadian RPM Country Tracks	1

==== Year-end charts ====
Chart (1988)	Position
US Hot Country Songs (Billboard)	35
