= Living Proof (Ricky Van Shelton song) =

Single by Ricky Van Shelton

from the album Loving Proof
- B-side: "Somebody's Back in Town"
- Released: July 1989
- Recorded: May 16, 1988
- Genre: Country
- Length: 3:22
- Label: Columbia Nashville
- Songwriters: Steve Clark and Johnny MacRae
- Producer: Steve Buckingham

Ricky Van Shelton singles chronology
| "Hole in My Pocket" (1989) | "Living Proof" (1989) | "Statue of a Fool" (1989) |

"Living Proof" is a song written by Johnny MacRae and Steve Clark, and recorded by American country music singer Ricky Van Shelton. It was released in July 1989 as the fourth single from the album Loving Proof. It was Shelton's sixth No. 1 single on the Billboard magazine Hot Country Singles chart that October.

== Chart positions ==
| Chart (1989) | Peak position |
|---|---|
| Canada Country Singles (RPM) | 1 |
| US Hot Country Songs (Billboard) | 1 |

=== Year-end charts ===
| Chart (1989) | Position |
|---|---|
| Canada Country Tracks (RPM) | 8 |
| US Country Songs (Billboard) | 12 |
