= Wayne Kemp =

American country music singer-songwriter (1940–2015)

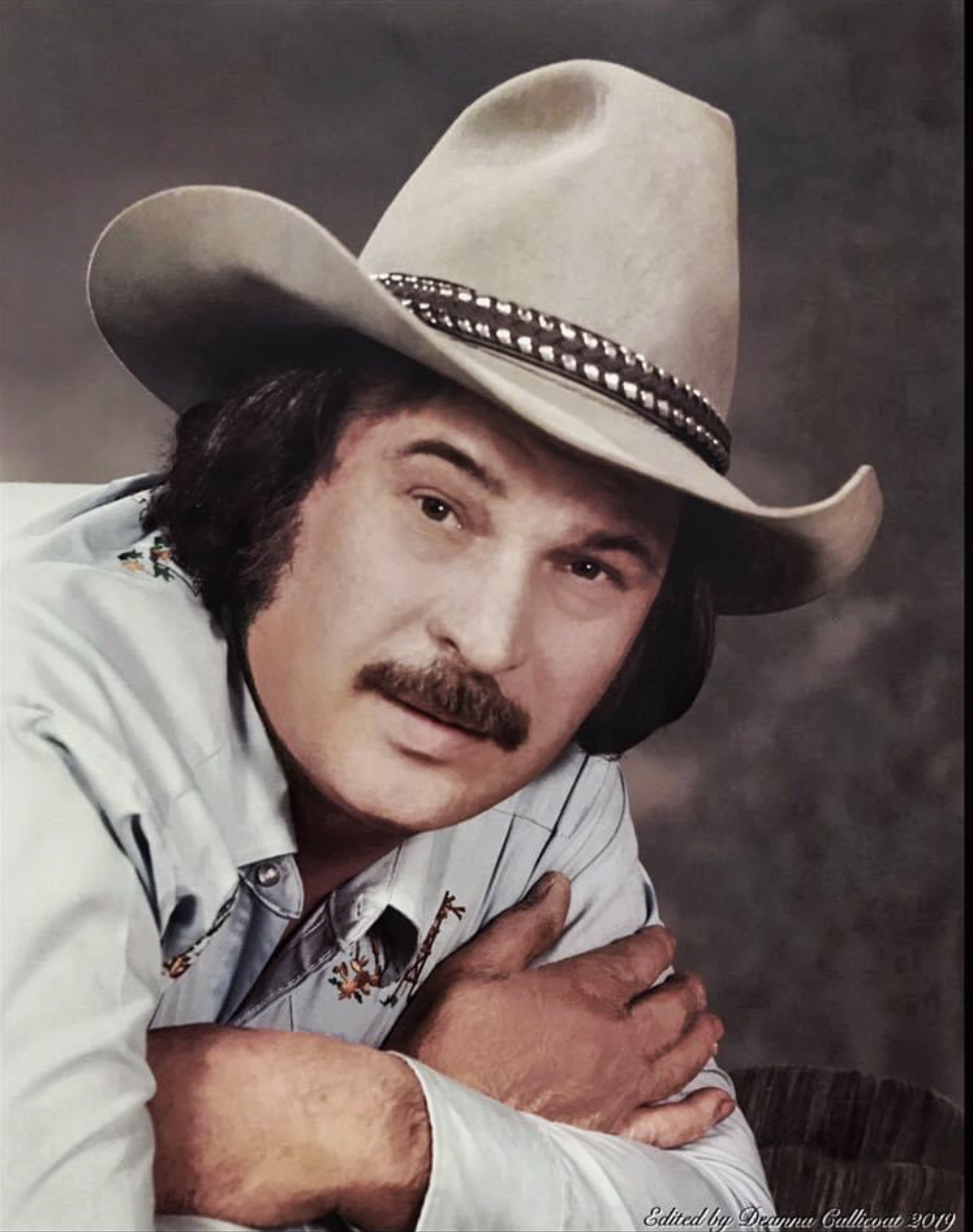

Background information
- Born: June 1, 1940; Greenwood, Arkansas, U.S.
- Died: March 9, 2015 (aged 74) Lafayette, Tennessee, U.S.
- Genres: Country
- Occupation: Singer-songwriter
- Instruments: Vocals, guitar
- Years active: 1967–1986
- Labels: Decca; MCA; United Artists; Mercury; Door Knob
- Formerly of: George Jones; Bobby G. Rice; Johnny Cash; Emmylou Harris; Conway Twitty; Ricky Van Shelton; George Strait

Wayne Kemp (June 1, 1940 – March 9, 2015) was an American country music singer and songwriter. He recorded between 1964 and 1986 for JAB Records, Decca, MCA, United Artists, Mercury and Door Knob Records, and had twenty-four charting singles on the Hot Country Songs charts. His highest-charting single was "Honky Tonk Wine", which peaked at No. 17 in 1973. The song is included on his second studio album, Kentucky Sunshine, which reached No. 25 on Top Country Albums.

Kemp was born, one of nine children, to a musical family in Greenwood, Arkansas. His parents played multiple instruments, and encouraged their children to pursue music. When Kemp was six, the family moved to Muldrow, Oklahoma, and he performed in church and at local events. By the age of 16, he was writing songs and playing guitar professionally with Tulsa country musician Benny Ketchum.

In 1965, a friend had shown Kemp's songs to George Jones. Jones recorded two of Kemp's songs, "Love Bug" and "I Made Her That Way." Soon, Kemp recorded with Jones and his backing band.

Kemp and his band were struck in their car by a drunk driver, which resulted in the death of two of his band members, and third degree burns across his body. He was told by doctors that he would never be able to play guitar again.

In 1968, he had his first number one hit with a song that he had written, "Next In Line" by Conway Twitty, quickly followed by more, with "The Image Of Me", "Darling, You Know I Wouldn't Lie" and "That's When She Started To Stop Loving You." Kemp signed as a staff writer with Tree International, and started touring. By this point, he was able to play guitar again, and toured with Conway Twitty's band as a guitar player.

From 1971 to 1983, Kemp released three solo records, and continued writing for other artists. Kemp achieved success writing songs for Johnny Cash ("One Piece At A Time"), George Strait ("The Fireman"), Johnny Paycheck ("The Only Hell My Mama Ever Raised"), Hank Williams Jr., Ronnie Milsap, Jack Greene, Faron Young, Mickey Gilley, Charley Pride, Tom Petty, and Willie Nelson. Ricky Van Shelton scored a number one country hit with a cover of "I'll Leave This World Loving You" and Emmylou Harriscovered "Feelin' Single, Seein' Double" on her album Elite Hotel.

Wayne Kemp was inducted into the Nashville Songwriters Hall of Fame in 1999.

Kemp died at the age of 74, on 9 March 2015, in Macon County General Hospital, Lafayette, Tennessee. He was suffering from multiple ailments and was on kidney dialysis when he died.

== Discography ==
=== Albums ===
Year	Album details	Chart Positions
Year	Album details	US Country
1971	Wayne Kemp: Release date: August 1971; Label: Decca Records	—
1974	Kentucky Sunshine: Release date: 1974; Label: MCA Records	25
1983	Country Past, Present, Future: Release date: 1983; Label: Door Knob	—

=== Singles ===
Year	Single	Chart Positions		Album
Year	Single	US Country	CAN Country	Album
1967	"Babblin Incoherently"		—	—
1967	"The Image Of Me"		—	—
1969	"Won't You Come Home (And Talk To A Stranger)"	61	—	Wayne Kemp
1969	"Bar Room Habits"	73	—	Wayne Kemp
1971	"Who'll Turn Out The Lights?"	57	—	Wayne Kemp
1971	"Award To An Angel"	52	—	Wayne Kemp
1971	"Did We Have to Come This Far (To Say Goodbye)"	72	—	non-album single
1972	"Darlin'"	53	—	Kentucky Sunshine
1973	"Honky Tonk Wine"	17	13	Kentucky Sunshine
1973	"Kentucky Sunshine"	53	—	Kentucky Sunshine
1974	"Listen"	32	94	Kentucky Sunshine
1974	"Harlan County"	57	—	non-album singles
1976	"Waiting For The Tables To Turn"	72	—	non-album singles
1976	"I Should Have Watched That First Step"	71	—	non-album singles
1977	"Leona Don't Live Here Anymore"	91	—	non-album singles
1977	"I Love It (When You Love All Over Me)"	76	—	non-album singles
1980	"Love Goes to Hell When It Dies"	62	—	non-album singles
1980	"I'll Leave This World Loving You"	47	—	non-album singles
1981	"Your Wife Is Cheatin' on Us Again"	35	—	non-album singles
1981	"Just Got Back From No Man's Land"	46	—	non-album singles
1981	"Why Am I Doing Without"	75	—	non-album singles
1982	"Sloe Gin And Fast Women"	78	—	non-album singles
1982	"She Only Meant To Use Him"	64	—	non-album singles
1983	"Don't Send Me No Angels"	55	—	Country Past, Present, Future
1984	"I've Always Wanted To"	75	—	Country Past, Present, Future
1986	"Red Neck And Over Thirty" (with Bobby G. Rice)	70	—	non-album single
