= Change of Heart (The Judds song) =

Single by The Judds

from the album Greatest Hits
- B-side: "I Wish She Wouldn't Treat You That Way"
- Released: October 17, 1988
- Studio: Creative Workshop (Berry Hill, Tennessee)
- Genre: Country
- Length: 3:35
- Label: RCA/Curb
- Songwriter: Naomi Judd
- Producer: Brent Maher

The Judds singles chronology
"Give a Little Love" (1988)	"Change of Heart" (1988)	"Young Love (Strong Love)" (1989)

"Change of Heart" is a song written by Naomi Judd, and recorded by American country music duo The Judds on their debut January 1984 extended play, Wynonna & Naomi. It was re-released in October 1988 as the second single from their Greatest Hits compilation album. The song was their twelfth number one country single. The single went to number one on the Billboard Hot Country Singles for one week and spent a total of fifteen weeks on the country chart.

== Chart performance ==
"Change of Heart" debuted on the U.S. Billboard Hot Country Singles & Tracks for the week of October 22, 1988.

Chart (1988–1989)	Peak position
US Hot Country Songs (Billboard)	1
Canadian RPM Country Tracks	1

=== Year-end charts ===
Chart (1989)	Position
US Country Songs (Billboard)	91
