= From a Jack to a King =

1962 single by Ned Miller

Single by Ned Miller

from the album From a Jack to a King
- B-side: "Parade of Broken Hearts"
- Released: 1957. Re-released December 15, 1962
- Recorded: 1957
- Genre: Country
- Length: 2:10
- Label: Fabor, Dot
- Songwriter: Ned Miller
- Producer: Fabor Robison

Ned Miller singles chronology
"Dark Moon" (1961)	"From a Jack to a King" (1957)	"One Among the Many" (1963)

Official audio
- "From a Jack to a King" on YouTube

"From a Jack to a King" is a country music song. Originally a crossover hit for artist Ned Miller, who also wrote "Dark Moon", "A Falling Star", and many other country songs. It has been covered extensively by country music artists.

== Ned Miller version ==
The original version was recorded by Ned Miller. First released in 1957 by both Fabor Records (for regional audiences) and Dot Records (for national distribution), Miller's version was unsuccessful until he persuaded his label to re-release it in 1962. Upon re-release, the song became a crossover hit, charting in the Top 10 on the Billboard U.S. country (No. 2), pop (No. 6), and adult contemporary (No. 3) charts. In addition, Miller's version reached No. 1 on the Irish Singles Chart, while peaking at No. 2 on the UK Singles Chart. Furthermore, it was the sixth-most-played single of 1963 in the United Kingdom. Miller's chart success was limited after the song, however, and by the 1970s he stopped recording entirely.

The song was also recorded in 1962 by Jim Reeves on the occasion of his tour to South Africa in August and charted there that year.

=== Chart positions ===
Chart (1963)	Peak position
Canada (CHUM Chart) (5 weeks)	1
Irish Singles Chart	1
UK Singles Chart	2
US Billboard Hot 100	6
US Adult Contemporary (Billboard)	3
US Hot Country Songs (Billboard)	2

== Ricky Van Shelton version ==
"From a Jack to a King"

Single by Ricky Van Shelton

from the album Loving Proof
- B-side: "The Picture"
- Released: December 24, 1988
- Recorded: January 19, 1988
- Genre: Country
- Length: 2:21
- Label: Columbia Nashville
- Songwriter: Ned Miller
- Producer: Steve Buckingham

Ricky Van Shelton singles chronology
"I'll Leave This World Loving You" (1988)	"From a Jack to a King" (1988)	"Hole in My Pocket" (1989)

In December 1988, American country music artist Ricky Van Shelton released his own version of "From a Jack to a King". Shelton's version became his fifth consecutive Number One on the Billboard Hot Country Singles charts.

=== Chart positions ===
Chart (1988–1989)	Peak position
US Hot Country Songs (Billboard)	1
Canadian RPM Country Tracks	1

=== Year-end charts ===
Chart (1989)	Position
Canada Country Tracks (RPM)	52
US Country Songs (Billboard)	58

== Other versions ==
Bill Anderson covered the song on his 1963 album Still, released by Decca Records.

Elvis Presley recorded it in 1969 and the song was included on this Back in Memphis album released in 1970. Jerry Lee Lewis also released a version of the song. Mud recorded the song in 1982.

South African singer Ray Dylan covered the song on his album Goeie Ou Country - Op Aanvraag.

The song features in E1 S3 of the historical drama television series The Crown.
