= Ned Miller =

American country music singer-songwriter (1925–2016)

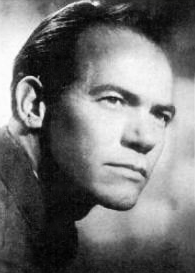
- Miller, 1964

Background information
- Born: Henry Ned Miller; April 12, 1925; Rains, Utah, U.S.
- Origin: Rains, Utah, U.S.
- Died: March 18, 2016 (aged 90) Medford, Oregon, U.S.
- Genre: Country
- Occupation: Singer-songwriter
- Instruments: Vocals, guitar
- Years active: 1956–1970
- Labels: Fabor; Capitol; Republic

Henry Ned Miller (April 12, 1925 – March 18, 2016) was an American country music singer-songwriter. Active as a recording artist from 1956 to 1970, he is known primarily for his hit single "From a Jack to a King", a crossover hit in 1962 which reached the Top 10 on the country music, adult contemporary, and Billboard Hot 100 chart, No. 1 for five weeks in Canada, as well as reaching No. 2 in the UK singles chart. He had several more chart singles in his career, although none matched the success of "From a Jack to a King". He also composed and recorded "Invisible Tears".

== Biography ==
Miller's start as a songwriter came when he was sixteen years old. He later joined the United States Marine Corps, from which he was later discharged.

In 1956, both Gale Storm and Bonnie Guitar had Top Five hits with different versions of the song "Dark Moon", which Miller co-wrote. Another song he wrote, "A Fallen Star", was a country hit for Jimmy C. Newman. Notable is also his uptempo song "Cave In", which in 1960 was the flip side of Warren Smith's No. 5 country hit "I Don't Believe I'll Fall In Love Today", recorded for the Liberty Records label. He also wrote and recorded the song "From a Jack to a King", which was released on Fabor Records but saw little success on the charts. After being briefly signed to Capitol Records, Miller returned to Fabor and persuaded them to re-release "From a Jack to a King". The song proved successful the second time around, and became a crossover hit for Miller. It sold over two million copies by July 1963, and was awarded a gold disc. It was a big hit also in the United Kingdom, where it peaked at No. 2 on the singles chart (spending four consecutive weeks there) and became the ninth best-selling single of 1963 in the UK in the process (making Miller the only American artist to reach the Top Ten best-sellers of the year in the UK that year).

Miller was not particularly interested in his singing career, and rarely toured owing to stage fright. He gave up recording in the 1970s and soon moved to Prescott, Arizona, and later to Las Vegas, Nevada.

Country music artist Ricky Van Shelton covered "From a Jack to a King" in the 1980s; his version reached No. 1 on the country music chart.

== Discography ==
=== Albums ===
Year	Album	Chart positions		Label
Year	Album	U.S. Country	U.S.	Label
1963	From a Jack to a King		50	Fabor
1965	Ned Miller Sings the Songs of Ned Miller			Capitol
1965	The Best of Ned Miller	28		Capitol
1967	Teardrop Lane	22		Capitol
1968	In the Name of Love			Capitol
1970	Ned Miller's Back			Republic
1981	From a Jack to a King			Plantation

=== Singles ===
Year	Single	U.S. Country	U.S.	U.S. AC	CAN	UK	IRE	Album
1957	"Roll O' Rollin' Stone"	—	—	—	—	—	—	Singles only
1957	"From a Jack to a King"	—	—	—	—	—	—	Singles only
1957	"Lights in the Street"	—	—	—	—	—	—	Singles only
1958	"Gypsy"	—	—	—	—	—	—	Singles only
1959	"Ring the Bell for Johnny"	—	—	—	—	—	—	Singles only
1961	"Cold Grey Bars"	—	—	—	—	—	—	Singles only
1961	"Dark Moon"	—	—	—	—	—	—	Singles only
1962	"From a Jack to a King" (re-release)	2	6	3	1	2	1	From a Jack to a King
1963	"One Among the Many"	27	—	—	—	—	—	From a Jack to a King
1963	"Another Fool Like Me"	28	—	—	—	—	—	Singles only
1963	"Big Love"	—	—	—	—	—	—	Singles only
	"Magic Moon"	—	—	—	—	—	—	Singles only
1964	"Invisible Tears"	13	131	—	—	—	—	The Best
1965	"Do What You Do Do Well"	7	52	—	29	48	—	The Best
1965	"Two Voices, Two Shadows, Two Faces"	—	—	—	—	—	—	Songs of Ned Miller
1965	"Whistle Walkin'"	28	—	—	—	—	—	Songs of Ned Miller
1965	"Down the Street"	—	—	—	—	—	—	Songs of Ned Miller
1966	"Lovin' Pains"	—	—	—	—	—	—	The Best
1966	"Summer Roses"	39	—	—	—	—	—	Teardrop Lane
1966	"Teardrop Lane"	44	—	—	—	—	—	Teardrop Lane
1967	"Echo of the Pines"	—	—	—	—	—	—	Singles only
1967	"Hobo"	53	—	—	—	—	—	Singles only
1968	"Only a Fool"	61	—	—	—	—	—	In the Name of Love
1969	"Autumn Winds"	—	—	—	—	—	—	Singles only
1970	"Breakin'"	—	—	—	—	—	—	Singles only
1970	"Lover's Song"	39	—	—	—	—	—	Ned Miller's Back
1970	"Back to Oklahoma"	—	—	—	—	—	—	Ned Miller's Back
