= Steve Buckingham (music producer) =

- Born: Stephen Craig Buckingham; Lakeside, Virginia, U.S.
- Genre: Country
- Occupation: Record producer
- Years active: 1969-present

Stephen Craig Buckingham is an American record producer and musician working in Nashville, Tennessee.

Buckingham is a music producer and guitarist whose work has generated at least 24 gold and 17 platinum record albums and earned him four Grammy Awards. Working as a young studio guitarist in 1977 he was given his first chance to produce a recording for an artist—it was called "I Love the Nightlife (Disco 'Round)", by Alicia Bridges. The song became an enduring world-wide hit and a signature song of the disco era, giving Buckingham virtually instant stature in the recording industry. As his career took off, he produced records by Dionne Warwick, Melissa Manchester, Ricky Van Shelton, Mary Chapin Carpenter, Dolly Parton, Tammy Wynette, Shania Twain, Sweethearts of the Rodeo, Garth Brooks, Ricky Skaggs and Linda Ronstadt, and is credited as producer on over 450 albums during his career. Buckingham has produced music for four feature films, including a Grammy win for the Muppets recording Follow That Bird (The Original Motion Picture Soundtrack) He was vice-president of A&R (artists and repertory) at Columbia Records for ten years, and Senior Vice-President of Vanguard Records and Sugar Hill Records. Later in his career, he became an adjunct instructor of Music History at Vanderbilt University's Blair School of Music in Nashville.

== Early life ==
Buckingham was born and raised in the Lakeside area of Henrico County, Virginia, which is a suburb of Richmond. At age 15, while attending Brookland Junior High School, he helped form a band called "Ron Moody and the Centaurs". At that time, beach music was becoming popular and Buckingham's band specialized in it. He stated, "We were a band of white boys who could play black music". Buckingham's musicianship sharpened through Hermitage High School and on to the University of Richmond, where he continued playing in this same band while majoring in sociology and psychology. During this time he taught himself to read music and studied books on music theory.

In 1969 his band went to Baltimore to record at a studio owned by engineer/producer and inventor George Massenburg. Massenburg and Buckingham hit it off musically, and Buckingham spent weekends in the studio learning how to make records. He stated, "(it was then) I knew this is what I wanted to do". He moved to Muscle Shoals, Alabama and worked as a session guitarist, performing on records by Billy Joe Royal, Johnny Nash and Joe South among others. Buckingham was a natural facilitator between the technical people and the musicians and was often in the control room arranging and writing charts. He said, "It was just just something I did, just my nature". After Muscle Shoals, he moved to Atlanta, working as a studio guitarist there as well as Los Angeles, Toronto and other cities.

== Big break ==
In Atlanta in 1977, while working for music publisher Bill Lowery at Doraville's Studio One, Buckingham got a chance to produce his first song. It was called "I Love the Nightlife (Disco 'Round)", by Alicia Bridges. He also played guitar on it. At first, no record company wanted to put the song out. The publisher was turned down several times before Polydor Records agreed to release it. "I Love The Nightlife (Disco 'Round)" became a worldwide hit in 1978. This song endured and became a party anthem, and it was on the playlist for clubs across North America and Europe and became one of the signature songs of the disco era. Buckingham's successful production of this song got him noticed in the music industry, namely by Clive Davis, chairman of Arista Records. Buckingham was invited to New York to meet with Davis. Buckingham stated, "He grilled me, kept me there for what seemed like hours, playing me things — 'Is this a hit? What do you think of this demo?' ... it was like taking college boards."

== Success ==
Clive Davis then hired Buckingham to produce an album for Melissa Manchester which was successful, and was followed by two more albums for her— then three albums for Dionne Warwick. With Columbia, Buckingham also signed and produced Mary Chapin Carpenter, who at the time was working as an office clerk. He worked for Columbia for about ten years as Vice President of A&R. In 1984, he was asked by Rick Blackburn, head of country music at CBS Records, to try a change from pop music to country music by producing Tammy Wynette. Success on this project resulted in Buckingham being hired by CBS as an A&R man. In this new role, Buckingham discovered and produced Ricky Van Shelton who won the CMA's "Male Vocalist of the Year" in 1987, with number one songs including "Wild-Eyed Dream", "Life Turned Her That Way" and "Somebody Lied". He produced Van Shelton's song, "Wear My Ring Around Your Neck" which was featured in the 1992 film, Honeymoon in Vegas. Buckingham produced five albums for Sweethearts of the Rodeo resulting in seven top ten hits.

In the 1990s, Dolly Parton was unceremoniously dropped from her label MCA/Universal. She was looking for another label. Simultaneously, Larry Welk (Lawrence Welk's son) had acquired Vanguard and Sugar Hill Records, and offered Buckingham a chance to try new things to revive the labels. In June 1999 Parton and Buckingham happened to be on the same airplane. They were old friends since Buckingham had previously produced 18 of her albums. They switched seats to be able to talk. Buckingham asked her if she would ever consider doing a bluegrass album. This resulted in the album The Grass Is Blue which won a Grammy Award for Best Bluegrass Album and was named Album of the Year by the International Bluegrass Music Association (IBMA) A subsequent Buckingham-produced Parton hit was "Shine" (with Nickel Creek), from the album Little Sparrow which won a Grammy for Best Female Country Performance.

Buckingham's fourth Grammy award was for Best Contemporary R&B Gospel album, called All Out by The Winans Family in 1994. The specialized sub-category winners are not broadcast live and often don't receive a lot of publicity. Buckingham recalls receiving a package in the mail. In it, he was surprised to find a Grammy statue. He had been so busy in the studio that he was unaware he had won it. A friend told him, "That should tell you something".

In 1978, Rick Nelson came to Memphis and made the only album he ever made anywhere but Los Angeles, produced by Larry Rogers. For unknown reasons, the CBS executives never released the material, and referred to it only as "the Memphis Sessions". Then in December 1985, Nelson was tragically killed in a plane crash. After Nelson's death, CBS wanted to release the album but decided to turn it over to Steve Buckingham in Nashville for re-vamping rather than its original supervisor, Larry Rogers. Buckingham's reconstruction of the album involved transferring the material from 16 track analog to 48 track digital tape, replacing the old drum parts with "hotter" drums, and replacing the guitar parts with a cleaner Fender Telecaster sound. Nevertheless, a controversy arose as to whether hard-to-please Nelson himself would have allowed the release. John Beland, Nelson's guitarist on the original work, said, "I'll tell you right from the outset Rick wouldn't have wanted anybody touching those tapes". Beland granted that Buckingham was one of Nashville's best producers and was glad that he was given the task if it had to be given to somebody else. Buckingham replied, "I knew it was a delicate line. I didn't want to intrude on the things that had already been done, but we couldn't leave it like it was...CBS wanted the project to be of the highest possible quality". Jack Hurst of The Chicago Tribune said "Buckingham's technique brings Nelson's voice out front as never before".

All Music Guide lists over 450 albums to Buckingham's credit.

== Motion pictures ==
Buckingham produced Jim Henson's Muppets who appeared with the Sesame Street cast in the recording Follow That Bird (The Original Motion Picture Soundtrack) for RCA that won a Grammy in 1986. He produced the end credit song, "Brother To Brother" for the film, Next Of Kin starring Patrick Swayze. The recording featured vocals by Gregg Allman and Lori Yates. He was the music producer for a CBS network television special in 1996 titled Dolly Parton: Treasures which featured Parton in concert as she saluted her favorite songs and the writers and performers who popularized them. This included Kenny Rogers, Merle Haggard, Neil Young, Kris Kristofferson, Alison Krauss and others. He produced songs for the feature film Nadine starring Jeff Bridges and Kim Bassinger and also a song in the feature film The Beverly Hillbillies based on the classic television series. Annabelle's Wish is an animated Christmas film for which Buckingham produced two songs.

== Later life ==
Buckingham gave the commencement address at his Virginia alma mater, the University of Richmond in 2007. He cited the many changes in the recording industry in recent years and advised the graduates, whatever their chosen profession, to stay on the cutting edge of developing technology. He became an adjunct instructor of Music History for the Blair School of Music at Vanderbilt University in Nashville and Virginia Wesleyan University in Virginia Beach. One of his most popular classes is "Rhythm and Blues Tore Down the Walls of Segregation".
