= Joe Diffie discography =

American artist

- Studio albums: 12
- Compilation albums: 6
- Singles: 38
- Music videos: 24

Joe Diffie was an American country music artist. His discography comprises 12 studio albums, six compilation albums and 38 singles. Among his albums, 1993's Honky Tonk Attitude and 1994's Third Rock from the Sun are his best-selling, having been certified platinum by the Recording Industry Association of America (RIAA) for shipments of one million copies. His singles include five Number Ones on the Hot Country Songs charts: "Home" (his debut single), as well as "If the Devil Danced (In Empty Pockets)", "Third Rock from the Sun", "Pickup Man" and "Bigger Than the Beatles".

== Studio albums ==
=== 1990s ===
Title	Album details	Peak chart positions			Certifications (sales thresholds)
Title	Album details	US Country	US	CAN Country	Certifications (sales thresholds)
A Thousand Winding Roads	Release date: September 7, 1990; Label: Epic Records; Formats: CD, cassette	23	—	—	
Regular Joe	Release date: January 14, 1992; Label: Epic Records; Formats: CD, cassette	22	132	25	US: Gold
Honky Tonk Attitude	Release date: April 20, 1993; Label: Epic Records; Formats: CD, cassette	10	67	—	CAN: Gold; US: Platinum
Third Rock from the Sun	Release date: July 26, 1994; Label: Epic Records; Formats: CD, cassette	6	53	9	CAN: Platinum; US: Platinum
Mr. Christmas	Release date: September 19, 1995; Label: Epic Records; Formats: CD, cassette	24	129	—	
Life's So Funny	Release date: December 5, 1995; Label: Epic Records; Formats: CD, cassette	28	167	14	CAN: Gold; US: Gold
Twice Upon a Time	Release date: April 22, 1997; Label: Epic Records; Formats: CD, cassette	33	—	—	
A Night to Remember	Release date: June 1, 1999; Label: Epic Records; Formats: CD, cassette	23	189	25	
"—" denotes releases that did not chart

=== 2000s and 2010s ===
Title	Album details	Peak chart positions		
Title	Album details	US Country	US Blue- grass	US Indie
In Another World	Release date: October 30, 2001; Label: Monument Records; Formats: CD, cassette	56	—	—
Tougher Than Nails	Release date: June 1, 2004; Label: Broken Bow Records; Formats: CD, music download	42	—	16
Homecoming: The Bluegrass Album	Release date: October 26, 2010; Label: Rounder Records; Formats: CD, music download	—	10	—
All in the Same Boat (with Sammy Kershaw and Aaron Tippin)	Release date: May 28, 2013; Label: Big Hit Records; Formats: CD, music download	70	—	—
"—" denotes releases that did not chart

== Compilation albums ==
Title	Album details	Peak chart positions	
Title	Album details	US Country	US
Greatest Hits	Release date: June 9, 1998; Label: Epic Records; Formats: CD, cassette	21	131
16 Biggest Hits	Release date: February 19, 2002; Label: Epic/Legacy Recordings; Formats: CD	4	38
Super Hits	Release date: September 24, 2002; Label: Epic/Legacy Recordings; Formats: CD	—	—
The Essential Joe Diffie	Release date: April 1, 2003; Label: Epic/Legacy Recordings; Formats: CD	—	—
The Ultimate Collection	Release date: October 20, 2009; Label: Rounder Records; Formats: CD, music download	—	—
Playlist: The Very Best of Joe Diffie	Release date: October 11, 2011; Label: Epic/Legacy Recordings; Formats: CD, music download	—	—
"—" denotes releases that did not chart

== Singles ==
=== 1990s ===
Year	Single	Peak chart positions			Album
Year	Single	US Country	US	CAN Country	Album
1990	"Home"	1	—	1	A Thousand Winding Roads
1990	"If You Want Me To"	2	—	1	A Thousand Winding Roads
1991	"If the Devil Danced (In Empty Pockets)"	1	—	4	A Thousand Winding Roads
1991	"New Way (To Light Up an Old Flame)"	2	—	2	A Thousand Winding Roads
1991	"Is It Cold in Here"	5	—	4	Regular Joe
1992	"Ships That Don't Come In"	5	—	3	Regular Joe
1992	"Next Thing Smokin'"	16	—	17	Regular Joe
1992	"Startin' Over Blues"	41	—	44	Regular Joe
1993	"Honky Tonk Attitude"	5	—	11	Honky Tonk Attitude
1993	"Prop Me Up Beside the Jukebox (If I Die)"	3	— (Note: "Prop Me Up Beside the Jukebox (If I Die)" did not enter the Hot 100, but peaked at number 22 on Bubbling Under Hot 100 Singles.)	2	Honky Tonk Attitude
1993	"John Deere Green"	5	69	6	Honky Tonk Attitude
1994	"In My Own Backyard"	19	—	10	Honky Tonk Attitude
1994	"Third Rock from the Sun"	1	84	1	Third Rock from the Sun
1994	"Pickup Man"	1	60	9	Third Rock from the Sun
1995	"So Help Me Girl"	2	84	1	Third Rock from the Sun
1995	"I'm in Love with a Capital "U""	21	—	22	Third Rock from the Sun
1995	"That Road Not Taken"	40	—	41	Third Rock from the Sun
1995	"Bigger Than the Beatles"	1	—	1	Life's So Funny
1995	"Leroy the Redneck Reindeer"	33	—	—	Mr. Christmas
1996	"C-O-U-N-T-R-Y"	23	—	27	Life's So Funny
1996	"Whole Lotta Gone"	23	—	21	Life's So Funny
1997	"This Is Your Brain"	25	—	32	Twice Upon a Time
1997	"Somethin' Like This"	40	—	76	Twice Upon a Time
1997	"The Promised Land"	61	—	—	Twice Upon a Time
1998	"Texas Size Heartache"	4	—	15	Greatest Hits
1998	"Poor Me"	43	—	49	Greatest Hits
1998	"Behind Closed Doors"	64	—	—	Tribute to Tradition
1999	"A Night to Remember"	6	38	10	A Night to Remember
1999	"The Quittin' Kind"	21	90	40	A Night to Remember
"—" denotes releases that did not chart

=== 2000s–2020s ===
Year	Single	Peak chart positions					Album
Year	Single	US Country	US Country Airplay	US	CAN	CAN Country	Album
2000	"It's Always Somethin'"	5		57	—	11	A Night to Remember
2001	"In Another World"	10		66	—	—	In Another World
2002	"This Pretender"	49		—	—	—	In Another World
2004	"Tougher Than Nails"	19		— (Note: "Tougher Than Nails" did not enter the Hot 100, but peaked at number 10 on Bubbling Under Hot 100 Singles.)	—	—	Tougher Than Nails
2004	"If I Could Only Bring You Back"	50		—	—	—	Tougher Than Nails
2013	"All in the Same Boat" (with Aaron Tippin and Sammy Kershaw)	—	—	—	—	—	All in the Same Boat
2013	"Girl Ridin' Shotgun" (with D-Thrash of Jawga Boyz)	—	—	—	—	—	Non-album singles
2018	"I Got This"	—	—	—	—	—	Non-album singles
2018	"Quit You"	—	—	—	—	—	Non-album singles
2023	"Pickup Man" (featuring Post Malone)	34	44	— (Note: "Pickup Man" did not enter the Hot 100, but peaked at number five on the Bubbling Under Hot 100 Singles chart.)	80	57	Hixtape: Vol. 3: Difftape
"—" denotes releases that did not chart

=== As a featured artist ===
Year	Single	Peak positions		Album
Year	Single	US Country	CAN Country	Album
1992	"Not Too Much to Ask" (Mary Chapin Carpenter with Joe Diffie)	15	12	Come On Come On
1998	"Same Old Train" (Note: All-star collaboration featuring Clint Black, Joe Diffie, Merle Haggard, Emmylou Harris, Alison Krauss, Patty Loveless, Earl Scruggs, Ricky Skaggs, Marty Stuart, Pam Tillis, Randy Travis, Travis Tritt and Dwight Yoakam.)	59	—	Tribute to Tradition
2009	"No Trash in My Trailer" (Colt Ford featuring Joe Diffie)	—	—	Ride Through the Country
"—" denotes releases that did not chart

== Music videos ==
Year	Video	Director
1990	"If You Want Me To"	Marius Penczner
1991	"If the Devil Danced (In Empty Pockets)"	Michael Salomon
1991	"Is It Cold in Here"	Peter Lippman
1992	"Ships That Don't Come In"	Jack Cole
1992	"Startin' Over Blues"	Richard Jernigan
1993	"Honky Tonk Attitude"	Richard Jernigan
1993	"Prop Me Up Beside the Jukebox (If I Die)"	Deaton Flanigen
1993	"Beverly Hillbillies Medley" (with Lorrie Morgan and Jim Varney)	Charley Randazzo
1994	"In My Own Backyard"	Richard Jernigan
1994	"Third Rock from the Sun"	Roger Pistole
1994	"Pickup Man"	Deaton Flanigen
1995	"So Help Me Girl"	Gerry Wenner
1995	"I'm in Love With a Capital "U""	Bud Schaetzle/Dean Tschetter
1995	"Leroy the Redneck Reindeer"	Dean Tschetter
1995	"Bigger Than the Beatles"	Deaton Flanigen
1996	"C-O-U-N-T-R-Y"	Deaton Flanigen
1997	"This Is Your Brain"	Roger Pistole
1997	"Something Like This"	Bob Gabrielsen
1998	"Texas Size Heartache"	Michael Oblowitz
1998	"Poor Me"	Chris Rogers
1999	"A Night to Remember"	Michael Oblowitz
1999	"It's Always Somethin'"	Jon Small
2013	"All in the Same Boat" (with Aaron Tippin and Sammy Kershaw)	
2013	"Girl Ridin' Shotgun" (with Jawga Boyz)	Blake Judd
