= Greatest Hits (Joe Diffie album) =

Greatest hits album by Joe Diffie
- Released: June 9, 1998
- Genre: Country
- Length: 42:09
- Label: Epic
- Producer: Johnny Slate; Bob Montgomery; Don Cook; Lonnie Wilson; Joe Diffie

Joe Diffie chronology
Twice Upon a Time (1997)	Greatest Hits (1998)	A Night to Remember (1999)

Singles from Greatest Hits
- 1. "Texas Size Heartache" Released: March 23, 1998; 2. "Poor Me" Released: September 1998

Professional ratings
Review scores
Source	Rating
Allmusic	link

Greatest Hits is the first greatest hits package released by American country music artist Joe Diffie. Released in 1998 on Epic Records, it contains the biggest hit singles from his first five studio albums, as well as three new tracks ("Poor Me", "Texas Size Heartache", and "Hurt Me All the Time"), of which the first two were released as singles.

Don Cook and Lonnie Wilson produced the new recordings.

== Track listing ==
No.	Title	Writer(s)	Length
1.	"Third Rock from the Sun" (radio edit)	Sterling Whipple, Tony Martin, John Greenebaum	2:48
2.	"John Deere Green"	Dennis Linde	4:34
3.	"Texas Size Heartache"	Zack Turner, Lonnie Wilson	2:41
4.	"Ships That Don't Come In"	Paul Nelson, Dave Gibson	3:39
5.	"Pickup Man"	Howard Perdew, Kerry Kurt Phillips	3:37
6.	"So Help Me Girl"	Perdew, Andy Spooner	3:32
7.	"Poor Me"	Al Anderson, Bob DiPiero	4:09
8.	"Honky Tonk Attitude"	Joe Diffie, Lee Bogan	3:49
9.	"Home"	Fred Lehner, Spooner	3:20
10.	"Prop Me Up Beside the Jukebox (If I Die)"	Phillips, Perdew, Rick Blaylock	3:46
11.	"Bigger Than the Beatles"	Steve Dukes, Jeb Stuart Anderson	3:55
12.	"Hurt Me All the Time"	Terry Skinner, Chad Austin	2:20

== Personnel ==
The following musicians performed on the tracks "Texas Size Heartache", "Poor Me", and "Hurt Me All the Time".

- Al Anderson – acoustic guitar, electric guitar
- Bruce C. Bouton – pedal steel guitar
- Mark Casstevens – acoustic guitar
- Joe Diffie – lead vocals, background vocals
- Larry Franklin – fiddle, mandolin
- Paul Franklin – pedal steel guitar
- John Barlow Jarvis – Hammond B-3 organ, Wurlitzer
- Liana Manis – background vocals
- Brent Mason – electric guitar
- Steve Nathan – piano
- Lonnie Wilson – drums, percussion
- Glenn Worf – bass guitar

== Chart performance ==
=== Weekly charts ===
Chart (1998)	Peak position
US Billboard 200	131
US Top Country Albums (Billboard)	21

=== Year-end charts ===
Chart (1998)	Position
US Top Country Albums (Billboard)	70
