= Hixtape: Vol. 3: Difftape =

2024 album by various artists

Mixtape by Various artists
- Released: March 29, 2024
- Genre: Country
- Length: 58:21
- Label: Big Loud
- Producer: Galen Griffin; Joe Diffie; Joey Moi; Lonnie Wilson; Phil O'Donnell

Hixtape chronology
Hixtape: Vol. 2 (2021)	Hixtape: Vol. 3: Difftape (2024)

Hixtape: Vol. 3: Difftape is a multi-artist tribute album released in March 2024. The album is a tribute to American country music singer Joe Diffie, who died in 2020, and incorporates previously unreleased recordings he made in 2006.

== History ==
Singer Hardy announced in early 2024 that he would be releasing the third installment of his Hixtape series, a series of mixtapes featuring various collaborators. The album includes Hardy and various other musicians, primarily from within country music, participating in covers of Joe Diffie songs. The recordings incorporate previously unreleased vocal tracks which Diffie recorded in 2006. Also included is a previously unreleased Joe Diffie song, "Life Had Plans for Me", featuring Diffie's son Parker. The album's rendition of "Ships That Don't Come In" features Toby Keith and was his last studio recording before his death from stomach cancer in February 2024. Other members of Diffie's family, credited as "the Difftones", provide backing vocals on "Prop Me Up Beside the Jukebox (If I Die)".

Prior to the album's release, two tracks were released in November 2023 as a "small batch". These were renditions of "John Deere Green" featuring Hardy and Morgan Wallen, and "Pickup Man" featuring Post Malone. Post Malone, Hardy, and Wallen also performed "Pickup Man" at the 57th annual Country Music Association awards ceremony that same month. The rendition of "Pickup Man" was released as the project's first single. The song marked Post Malone's first entry on the Billboard Country Airplay charts.

== Critical reception ==
James Daykin of Entertainment Focus called the album "a heartfelt and nostalgic homage to Joe Diffie, showcasing the timeless appeal of his music and the enduring influence he continues to have on the country genre". Country Central writer Cam Greene gave the album nine out of 10, praising most of the tracks for retaining the neotraditional country sound of the 1990s, but criticizing the "rough" nature of Hardy's and Post Malone's respective vocals on "John Deere Green" and "Pickup Man".

== Track listing ==
Note: All tracks feature Joe Diffie.

No.	Title	Writer(s)	Featured artist(s)	Length
1.	"John Deere Green"	Dennis Linde	Hardy; Morgan Wallen	4:27
2.	"Pickup Man"	Howard Perdew; Kerry Kurt Phillips	Post Malone	3:36
3.	"Ships That Don't Come In"	Dave Gibson; Paul Nelson	Toby Keith; Luke Combs	3:44
4.	"Third Rock from the Sun"	Sterling Whipple; John Greenebaum; Tony Martin	Brooks & Dunn; Blake Shelton; Hardy	2:50
5.	"Prop Me Up Beside the Jukebox (If I Die)"	Perdew; Phillips; Rick Blaylock	Tracy Lawrence; Lainey Wilson; The Difftones	3:48
6.	"Bigger Than the Beatles"	Jeb Stuart Anderson; Steve Dukes	Old Dominion; Jon Pardi	3:57
7.	"Honky Tonk Attitude"	Joe Diffie; Lee Bogan	Luke Bryan; Randy Houser	3:27
8.	"Is It Cold in Here"	Diffie; Phillips; Danny Morrison	Reba McEntire; Jake Worthington	3:50
9.	"Texas Size Heartache"	Zack Turner; Lonnie Wilson	Clint Black; Larry Fleet	2:41
10.	"Home"	William Lehner; Andy Spooner	Darius Rucker; Hailey Whitters	3:23
11.	"C-O-U-N-T-R-Y"	Dusty Drake; Ron Harbin; Ed Hill	Aaron Tippin; Ernest	2:36
12.	"So Help Me Girl"	Perdew; Spooner	Mark Wills; Nate Smith	3:30
13.	"New Way (To Light Up an Old Flame)"	Diffie; L. Wilson	Sammy Kershaw; Randall King	2:46
14.	"If the Devil Danced (In Empty Pockets)"	Spooner; Kim Williams	Jack Ingram; Koe Wetzel	2:47
15.	"A Night to Remember"	Max T. Barnes; T.W. Hale	Kameron Marlowe; Lauren Watkins	3:29
16.	"In Another World"	Tom Shapiro; Wally Wilson; Jimmy Yeary	Chris Young	3:42
17.	"Life Had Plans for Me"	Diffie; Galen Griffin; Phil O'Donnell	Hardy; Parker Diffie	3:50
Total length:				58:21

== Chart performance ==
Chart performance for Hixtape: Vol. 3: Difftape
Chart (2024)	Peak position
US Top Country Albums (Billboard)	41
