= Third Rock from the Sun =

Studio album by Joe Diffie
- Released: July 26, 1994
- Studio: SoundShop Recording Studios
- Genre: Country
- Length: 37:26
- Label: Epic
- Producer: Joe Diffie; Johnny Slate

Joe Diffie chronology
Honky Tonk Attitude (1993)	Third Rock from the Sun (1994)	Mr. Christmas (1995)

Singles from Third Rock from the Sun
- 1. "Third Rock from the Sun" Released: July 4, 1994; 2. "Pickup Man" Released: October 17, 1994; 3. "So Help Me Girl" Released: January 30, 1995; 4. "I'm in Love with a Capital "U"" Released: May 27, 1995; 5. "That Road Not Taken" Released: August 12, 1995

Professional ratings
Review scores
Source	Rating
AllMusic	4.5/5 stars
Entertainment Weekly	A

Third Rock from the Sun is the fourth studio album by American country music artist Joe Diffie. Diffie's breakthrough album, the first five tracks were all released as singles, and all charted on the Billboard Hot Country Singles & Tracks (now Hot Country Songs) charts. Of these five singles, "Pickup Man" and the title track were both Number One hits, "So Help Me Girl" reached #2, "I'm in Love with a Capital 'U'" reached #21, and "That Road Not Taken" peaked at #40. "Pickup Man" was also Diffie's longest-lasting number one, having held that position for four weeks.

== Track listing ==
No.	Title	Writer(s)	Length
1.	"Third Rock from the Sun"	Sterling Whipple, Tony Martin, John Greenebaum	3:04
2.	"I'm in Love with a Capital "U""	Paul Nelson, Craig Wiseman	3:17
3.	"That Road Not Taken"	Casey Kelly, Deborah Beasley	4:17
4.	"Pickup Man"	Howard Perdew, Kerry Kurt Phillips	3:36
5.	"So Help Me Girl"	H. Perdew, Andy Spooner	3:29
6.	"Wild Blue Yonder"	Stacey Slate, Michael Higgins	3:53
7.	"I'd Like to Have a Problem Like That"	Whipple, Martin, Greenebaum	3:20
8.	"Junior's in Love"	Dennis Linde	3:09
9.	"From Here on Out"	H. Perdew, Carol Perdew, Monica Stiles	3:24
10.	"Good Brown Gravy"	Billy Dean, Verlon Thompson, Bill Kenner	3:02
11.	"The Cows Came Home"	Joe Diffie, Lonnie Wilson, Lee Bogan	2:55

== Personnel ==
- Lee Bogan – background vocals (1, 11)
- Walt Cunningham – electric keyboards (1, 3, 5, 6, 9), synthesizer strings (3, 5, 9), special effects (6)
- Billy Dean – background vocals (10)
- John Dickson – cow sounds (11)
- Joe Diffie – lead vocals (all tracks), background vocals (all tracks), cow sounds (11)
- Stuart Duncan – fiddle (4, 6, 7, 9, 10)
- Craig "Flash" Fletcher – background vocals (1, 11)
- Paul Franklin – steel guitar (1–7, 9)
- Clay Keith – background vocals (5, 6)
- Larry Keith – background vocals (5, 6)
- Terry McMillan – harmonica (8, 10)
- Brent Mason – electric guitar (all tracks)
- Tim Mensy – acoustic guitar (5, 8)
- Larry Paxton – bass guitar (3–6, 8–11)
- Matt Rollings – piano (all tracks)
- Johnny Slate – cow sounds (11)
- Billy Joe Walker Jr. – acoustic guitar (all tracks)
- Lonnie Wilson – drums (all tracks), percussion (1, 2, 8, 10, 11)
- Glenn Worf – bass guitar (1, 2, 7)

Track information and credits adapted from Discogs and AllMusic, then verified from the album's liner notes.

== Charts ==
=== Weekly charts ===
Chart (1994)	Peak position
Canadian Country Albums (RPM)	9
US Billboard 200	53
US Top Country Albums (Billboard)	6

=== Year-end charts ===
Chart (1994)	Position
US Top Country Albums (Billboard)	54
Chart (1995)	Position
US Billboard 200	99
US Top Country Albums (Billboard)	16

=== Singles ===
Title	Date	Chart	Peak position
"Pickup Man"	December 16, 1994	US Hot Country Songs (Billboard)	1
"Third Rock from the Sun"	September 23, 1994	US Hot Country Songs (Billboard)	1
"So Help Me Girl"	April 7, 1995	US Hot Country Songs (Billboard)	2
"I'm in Love with a Capital "U""	July 7, 1995	US Hot Country Songs (Billboard)	21
"That Road Not Taken"	October 6, 1995	US Hot Country Songs (Billboard)	40

== Certifications ==
Region	Certification	Certified units/sales
Canada (Music Canada)	Platinum	100,000^{^}
United States (RIAA)	Platinum	1,000,000^{^}
^{^} Shipments figures based on certification alone.
