= In Another World (Joe Diffie album) =

Studio album by Joe Diffie
- Released: October 30, 2001
- Genre: Country
- Label: Monument
- Producer: Don Cook; Lonnie Wilson

Joe Diffie chronology
A Night to Remember (1999)	In Another World (2001)	Tougher Than Nails (2004)

Singles from In Another World
- 1. "In Another World" Released: July 23, 2001; 2. "This Pretender" Released: March 2002

Professional ratings
Review scores
Source	Rating
Allmusic	link

In Another World is the ninth studio album by American country music artist Joe Diffie. It was released on October 30, 2001, through Monument Records. His only album for Monument, it features the single "In Another World", a Top Ten single on the Billboard country singles charts in 2002. "This Pretender" was also released as a single, reaching #48.

Two of this album's tracks were also recorded by other artists. "The Grandpa That I Know" was originally recorded by Tim Mensy on his 1992 album This Ol' Heart and later by Patty Loveless on her 2004 album On Your Way Home. "My Give a Damn's Busted" was covered by Jo Dee Messina on her 2005 album Delicious Surprise. Messina's rendition of the latter song was released in early 2005, and was a Number One single for her on the country charts.

== Track listing ==
No.	Title	Writer(s)	Length
1.	"In Another World"	Tom Shapiro, Wally Wilson, Jimmy Yeary	3:46
2.	"My Give a Damn's Busted"	Tony Martin, Joe Diffie, Shapiro	3:19
3.	"If I Lost Her"	Kenny Beard, Yeary, Buddy Brock	3:44
4.	"Stoned on Her Love"	Andy Griggs, Lonnie Wilson, Zack Turner	3:57
5.	"Hollow Deep as Mine"	John Scott Sherrill, Shawn Camp	3:41
6.	"This Pretender"	Gary LeVox, L. Wilson, Turner	3:54
7.	"Like a River Dreams of Rain"	Walt Aldridge, James LeBlanc	3:56
8.	"Live to Love Another Day"	Martin, Shapiro, Bryan White	3:13
9.	"What a Way to Go"	L. Wilson, Kim Williams, Turner	3:15
10.	"The Grandpa That I Know"	Tim Mensy, Camp	5:26

== Personnel ==
- Mike Brignardello - bass guitar
- Mark Casstevens - acoustic guitar
- Joe Diffie - lead vocals, background vocals
- Dan Dugmore - Dobro, pedal steel guitar
- Paul Franklin - Dobro, Hawaiian guitar
- Aubrey Haynie - fiddle, mandolin
- David Hungate - bass guitar
- John Barlow Jarvis - keyboards, organ, piano
- B. James Lowry - acoustic guitar, electric guitar, slide guitar
- Brent Mason - acoustic guitar, electric guitar, gut string guitar
- Steve Nathan - keyboards, organ, piano
- Kim Parent - background vocals
- Zach Turner - banjo, clavinet, harp
- Tommy White - Dobro
- Lonnie Wilson - drums, percussion, acoustic guitar, background vocals
- Glenn Worf - bass guitar

== Chart performance ==
Chart (2001)	Peak position
U.S. Billboard Top Country Albums	56
