= Regular Joe =

Regular Joe may refer to:

- Regular Joe (album), an album by Joe Diffie
- Regular Joe (TV series), an American sitcom
