= Honky Tonk Attitude =

Studio album by Joe Diffie
- Released: April 20, 1993
- Recorded: December 18, 1992
- Studio: Sound Shop (Nashville, Tennessee); Woodland Digital (Nashville, Tennessee)
- Genre: Country
- Length: 40:06
- Label: Epic
- Producer: Bob Montgomery; Johnny Slate

Joe Diffie chronology
Regular Joe (1992)	Honky Tonk Attitude (1993)	Third Rock from the Sun (1994)

Singles from Honky Tonk Attitude
- 1. "Honky Tonk Attitude" Released: March 8, 1993; 2. "Prop Me Up Beside the Jukebox (If I Die)" Released: July 19, 1993; 3. "John Deere Green" Released: November 8, 1993; 4. "In My Own Backyard" Released: February 28, 1994

Professional ratings
Review scores
Source	Rating
Allmusic	3/5 stars
Christgau's Consumer Guide	(neither)
Entertainment Weekly	A−

Honky Tonk Attitude is the third studio album by American country music artist Joe Diffie. Released in 1993, it features the singles "Honky Tonk Attitude", "Prop Me Up Beside the Jukebox (If I Die)", "John Deere Green", and "In My Own Backyard", which respectively reached #5, #3, #5, and #19 on the Hot Country Songs charts. The song "If I Had Any Pride Left at All" was later recorded by John Berry on his 1995 album Standing on the Edge, from which it was released as a single.

== Track listing ==
No.	Title	Writer(s)	Length
1.	"Honky Tonk Attitude"	Joe Diffie, Lee Bogan	3:47
2.	"I'm Not Through Losin' You"	Diffie, Chris Waters, Lonnie Wilson	3:06
3.	"Prop Me Up Beside the Jukebox (If I Die)"	Howard Perdew, Rick Blaylock, Kerry Kurt Phillips	3:46
4.	"If I Had Any Pride Left at All"	Troy Seals, Eddie Setser, John Greenbaum	3:23
5.	"I Can Walk the Line (If It Ain't Too Straight)"	Randy Boudreaux, Phillips	3:20
6.	"Somewhere Under the Rainbow"	Scott Blackwell, Jerry Laseter, Phillips	4:17
7.	"John Deere Green"	Dennis Linde	4:32
8.	"In My Own Backyard"	Diffie, Phillips, Andy Spooner	3:38
9.	"Here Comes That Train"	L. David Lewis	3:14
10.	"And That Was the Easy Part"	Wendell Mobley, John Jarrard	4:01
11.	"Cold Budweiser and a Sweet 'Tater"	Teddy Gentry, Ronnie Rogers, Greg Fowler	3:03

== Personnel ==
- Kenny Bell – acoustic guitar
- Lee Bogan – background vocals
- Bruce Bouton – steel guitar
- Walt Cunningham – keyboards
- Joe Diffie – lead vocals, background vocals
- Stuart Duncan – fiddle
- Paul Franklin – steel guitar
- Rob Hajacos – fiddle
- Yvonne Hodges – background vocals
- Jim Hoke – saxophone
- John Hughey – steel guitar
- Bill Hullett – acoustic guitar
- Carl Jackson – background vocals
- Pierce Jackson – background vocals
- Brent Mason – electric guitar
- Tim Mensy – acoustic guitar, background vocals
- Kenny Mims – electric guitar
- Kim Morrison – background vocals
- Larry Paxton – bass guitar
- Dave Pomeroy – bass guitar
- Matt Rollings – keyboards
- John Wesley Ryles – background vocals
- Hurshel Wiginton – background vocals
- Lonnie Wilson – drums

Additional background vocals on "Prop Me Up Beside the Jukebox (If I Die)" performed by the "Epic Proportion Choir".

== Charts ==
=== Weekly charts ===
Chart (1993–1994)	Peak position
US Billboard 200	67
US Top Country Albums (Billboard)	10

=== Year-end charts ===
Chart (1993)	Position
US Top Country Albums (Billboard)	58
Chart (1994)	Position
US Top Country Albums (Billboard)	30
