= Life's So Funny =

Studio album by Joe Diffie
- Released: December 5, 1995
- Studio: SoundShop Recording Studios
- Genre: Country
- Length: 35:11
- Label: Epic
- Producers: Johnny Slate; Joe Diffie

Joe Diffie chronology
Mr. Christmas (1995)	Life's So Funny (1995)	Twice Upon a Time (1997)

Singles from Life's So Funny
- 1. "Bigger Than the Beatles" Released: November 27, 1995; 2. "C-O-U-N-T-R-Y" Released: March 2, 1996; 3. "Whole Lotta Gone" Released: June 22, 1996

Professional ratings
Review scores
Source	Rating
Allmusic	link

Life's So Funny is the sixth studio album by American country music artist Joe Diffie. It was released on December 5, 1995, through Epic Records. It contains the single "Bigger Than the Beatles", Diffie's last Number One single on the Billboard Hot Country Singles & Tracks (now Hot Country Songs) charts. Following this single were "C-O-U-N-T-R-Y" and "Whole Lotta Gone"; both peaked at #23. The track "Tears in the Rain" (co-written by Diffie) was originally recorded by Tim McGraw on his 1993 self-titled debut album.

Despite not being released as a single, the track "Down in a Ditch" received frequent airplay on KKBQ in Houston, Texas.

== Track listing ==
No.	Title	Writer(s)	Length
1.	"Bigger Than the Beatles"	Jeb Stuart Anderson, Steve Dukes	3:58
2.	"Never Mine to Lose"	Nancy Lee Baxter, Joe Doyle	3:41
3.	"Down in a Ditch"	Dennis Linde	3:07
4.	"Tears in the Rain"	Joe Diffie, Lonnie Wilson, Wayne Perry	3:20
5.	"C-O-U-N-T-R-Y"	Ron Harbin, Ed Hill, Dusty Drake	2:38
6.	"She Loves Me"	Stephony Smith, Tommy Lee James	3:43
7.	"Back to the Cave"	Skip Ewing, Tim Johnson	4:04
8.	"I'm Willing to Try"	Dean Sams, Wendell Mobley, John Jarrard	4:21
9.	"Whole Lotta Gone"	Mark James Oliverius, Keith Burns	2:59
10.	"Life's So Funny"	Bob Moulds, Wyatt Easterling	3:20

== Personnel ==
- Lee Bogan – background vocals
- Joe Diffie – lead vocals, background vocals
- Stuart Duncan – fiddle, mandolin
- Paul Franklin – steel guitar
- Randy McCormick – piano, keyboards
- Terry McMillan – percussion
- Brent Mason – electric guitar
- Steve Nathan – keyboards
- Billy Joe Walker Jr. – acoustic guitar
- Lonnie Wilson – drums, percussion
- Glenn Worf – bass guitar

Strings by The Nashville String Machine arranged by Carl Gorodetzky.

== Charts ==
=== Weekly charts ===
Chart (1995–1996)	Peak position
Canadian Country Albums (RPM)	14
US Billboard 200	167
US Top Country Albums (Billboard)	28

=== Year-end charts ===
Chart (1996)	Position
US Top Country Albums (Billboard)	65
