= Tougher Than Nails =

Studio album by Joe Diffie
- Released: June 1, 2004
- Genre: Country
- Label: Broken Bow
- Producer: Joe Diffie (tracks 1, 4–10, 12); Buddy Cannon (tracks 2, 3, 11); Lonnie Wilson (all tracks)

Joe Diffie chronology
In Another World (2001)	Tougher Than Nails (2004)	Homecoming: The Bluegrass Album (2010)

Singles from Tougher Than Nails
- 1. "Tougher Than Nails" Released: May 2004; 2. "If I Could Only Bring You Back" Released: September 2004

Professional ratings
Review scores
Source	Rating
Allmusic	3/5 stars

Tougher Than Nails is the tenth studio album by American country music artist Joe Diffie. His only album for Broken Bow Records, it was released on June 1, 2004. It The title track was a Top 20 hit on the Billboard Hot Country Singles & Tracks (now Hot Country Songs) charts in 2004, but the second single ("If I Could Only Bring You Back") failed to make Top 40.

== Track listing ==
No.	Title	Writer(s)	Length
1.	"Tougher Than Nails"	Max T. Barnes, Kendell Marvel, Phil O'Donnell	3:10
2.	"Nothin' but the Radio"	Frank J. Myers, George Teren	3:26
3.	"Good News, Bad News"	Danny Wells, Chris Wallin	3:47
4.	"The More You Drink, The Better I Look"	Joe Diffie, Shawn Camp	2:24
5.	"Am I"	Diffie, Billy Yates	2:56
6.	"Movin' Train"	Diffie	3:31
7.	"If I Could Only Bring You Back"	Chip Davis, Myers	3:54
8.	"What Would Waylon Do"	Leslie Satcher, Wynn Varble	3:16
9.	"Something I Do for Me"	Diffie, Harley Allen	3:44
10.	"Daddy's Home"	Diffie, Jimmy Yeary	3:37
11.	"This Time Last Year"	Gilles Godard, Bobby Tomberlin, Robbie Wittkowski	3:10
12.	"My Redneck of the Woods"	O'Donnell, Craig Morgan	3:58
Total length:			40:53

== Personnel ==
- Tim Akers - piano
- J. T. Corenflos - electric guitar
- Joe Diffie - acoustic guitar, lead vocals, background vocals
- Larry Franklin - fiddle
- Paul Franklin - Dobro, pedal steel guitar
- Aubrey Haynie - fiddle, mandolin
- George Jones - vocals on "What Would Waylon Do"
- B. James Lowry - acoustic guitar
- Gary Lunn - bass guitar
- Brent Mason - electric guitar
- Randy McCormick - piano
- Steve Nathan - Hammond B-3 organ, piano
- Larry Paxton - bass guitar
- Gary Prim - piano
- Jason Roller - electric guitar, soloist
- Scotty Sanders - pedal steel guitar
- Biff Watson - acoustic guitar
- John Willis - acoustic guitar
- Lonnie Wilson - drums, percussion
- Glenn Worf - bass guitar
- Jonathan Yudkin - strings

== Chart performance ==
Chart (2004)	Peak position
U.S. Billboard Top Country Albums	42
U.S. Billboard Independent Albums	16
