= Mr. Christmas (Joe Diffie album) =

Studio album by Joe Diffie
- Released: September 19, 1995
- Genre: Christmas; country
- Length: 40:01
- Label: Epic
- Producer: Joe Diffie; Johnny Slate

Joe Diffie chronology
Third Rock from the Sun (1994)	Mr. Christmas (1995)	Life's So Funny (1995)

Singles from Mr. Christmas
- 1. "Leroy the Redneck Reindeer" Released: December 1995

Professional ratings
Review scores
Source	Rating
Allmusic	2.5/5 stars

Mr. Christmas is the first Christmas album and fifth studio album by American country music artist Joe Diffie. It was released on September 19, 1995, through Epic Records. The song "Leroy the Redneck Reindeer" was released as a single, peaking at #33 on the U.S. Billboard Hot Country Singles & Tracks (now Hot Country Songs) charts that year. Otherwise, the album features a mix of traditional Christmas music and newly penned songs.

== Track listing ==
No.	Title	Writer(s)	Length
1.	"Mr. Christmas"	Joe Diffie; Lee Bogan	3:14
2.	"The Christmas Song"	Mel Tormé; Robert Wells	4:23
3.	"Leroy the Redneck Reindeer"	Diffie; Stacey Slate; Steve Pippin	3:17
4.	"Have Yourself a Merry Little Christmas"	Hugh Martin; Ralph Blane	3:51
5.	"Let It Snow! Let It Snow! Let It Snow!"	Sammy Cahn; Jule Styne	2:46
6.	"Wrap Me in Your Love"	Slate; Wyatt Easterling	3:14
7.	"All Because of a Baby Boy"	Slate; Easterling	3:27
8.	"Silent Night"	Franz Gruber; Joseph Mohr	2:58
9.	"Praise and Alleluia to the Savior"	Diffie; Bogan	3:47
10.	"Magazine Angels"	Raymond C. Davis Jr.; Gene Pistilli	4:01
11.	"O Holy Night"	Adolphe Adam; John Sullivan Dwight	4:58
Total length:			40:01

== Personnel ==
Credits listed from AllMusic.

Vocals

- Danny Bailey – background vocals
- Lea Jane Berinati – background vocals
- Lee Bogan – background vocals
- Joe Diffie – lead vocals, background vocalist
- Janie Fricke – background vocals
- Ricky Skaggs – guest vocals
- Larry Keith – background vocals

Musicians

- Stuart Duncan – fiddle
- Paul Franklin – steel guitar
- Carl Gorodetzky – string contractor
- Terry McMillan – harmonica, percussion
- Brent Mason – electric guitar
- The Nashville String Machine – strings
- Matt Rollings – keyboards
- Billy Joe Walker Jr. – acoustic guitar
- Bergen White – string arrangements
- Lonnie Wilson – drums
- Glenn Worf – bass guitar

Production

- Mike Bradley – engineer, mixing
- Madeline Bridges – director
- Mark Capps – engineer
- Joe Diffie – arranger, audio production, producer
- Caroline Greyshock – photography
- Marilyn Shadinger – director
- Johnny Slate – arranger, audio production, producer

== Chart performance ==
Chart (1995)	Peak position
U.S. Billboard Top Country Albums	24
U.S. Billboard 200	129
U.S. Billboard Top Holiday Albums	32
