= Tribute to Tradition =

Studio album by Various Artists
- Released: September 22, 1998
- Genre: Country
- Label: Columbia
- Producer: Various

Tribute to Tradition is a 1998 American tribute album released in 1998 via Columbia Records Nashville. The album mainly consists of cover songs of country songs from the 1950s through the 1970s, as done by then-contemporary country music artists.

== Content ==
"Same Old Train", the only song on the album which is not a cover, charted at number 59 on Billboard Hot Country Songs in 1998. The song won the 1999 Grammy Award for Best Country Collaboration with Vocals.

Joe Diffie's rendition of Charlie Rich's "Behind Closed Doors" also charted at number 64, and Doug Stone's cover of Steve Wariner's "Gone Out of My Mind" peaked at number 48. The album was intended as a fundraiser for a retirement center in Nashville, Tennessee.

== Critical reception ==
Jana Pendragon of AllMusic rated the album four out of five stars. Although she criticized Joe Diffie and Collin Raye's vocal performance on "Honky Tonk Heroes Like Me" and Mary Chapin Carpenter's on "Oh Lonesome Me", she praised the album for the variety of artists and thought that "Same Old Train" was a "grand finale". Joel Bernstein of Country Standard Time gave the album a mostly positive review, as he thought the album had potential to introduce country music standards to a more contemporary audience.

== Track listing ==
No.	Title	Writer(s)	Producer(s)	Length
1.	"Stand by Your Man" (Dixie Chicks)	Billy Sherrill; Tammy Wynette	Blake Chancey, Paul Worley	3:21
2.	"Mama Tried" (Randy Travis)	Merle Haggard	James Stroud, Travis	2:15
3.	"Wine, Women, and Song" (Patty Loveless)	Betty Sue Perry	Vince Gill	2:32
4.	"I Never Go Around Mirrors" (Trace Adkins)	Lefty Frizzell; Sanger D. Shafer	Adkins	4:46
5.	"Oh Lonesome Me" (Mary Chapin Carpenter)	Don Gibson	Chet Atkins	3:37
6.	"Behind Closed Doors" (Joe Diffie)	Kenny O'Dell	Diffie, Johnny Slate	3:10
7.	"She's Actin' Single (I'm Drinkin' Doubles)" (Wade Hayes)	Wayne Carson	Don Cook	3:34
8.	"'Til I Can Make It on My Own" (Martina McBride)	Sherrill; Wynette; George Richey	Worley, McBride	3:10
9.	"Cold, Cold Heart" (Collin Raye)	Hank Williams	Worley, Raye, Billy Joe Walker Jr.	3:22
10.	"The Three Bells" (Alison Krauss)	Jean Villard; Bert Reisfeld	Atkins	4:11
11.	"City Lights" (Rick Trevino)	Bill Anderson	Doug Johnson, Steve Buckingham	2:44
12.	"Honky Tonk Heroes (Like Me)" (Joe Diffie, Collin Raye)	Billy Joe Shaver	Raye, Diffie	3:30
13.	"Gone Out of My Mind" (Doug Stone)	Bob Morrison; Gene Dobbins; Michael Huffman	Jerry Kennedy, John Guess	3:26
14.	"Same Old Train" (Clint Black, Joe Diffie, Merle Haggard, Emmylou Harris, Alison Krauss, Patty Loveless, Earl Scruggs, Ricky Skaggs, Marty Stuart, Pam Tillis, Randy Travis, Travis Tritt, Dwight Yoakam)	Stuart	Stuart	6:00
Total length:				49:38

== Personnel ==
"Stand by Your Man"

- Deb Boyle - production coordinator
- Tony Castle - assistant
- Blake Chancey - producer
- Dixie Chicks - performer
  - Emily Erwin - vocals, Dobro
  - Natalie Maines - lead vocals
  - Martie Seidel - vocals, fiddle
- J.T. Corenflos - electric guitar
- Rodney Good - recording
- John Guess - mixing
- Lloyd Maines - steel guitar
- George Marinelli - electric guitar
- Greg Morrow - drums
- Michael Rhodes - bass guitar, six-string bass
- Matt Rollings - piano
- Christopher Rowe - assistant
- Paul Worley - acoustic guitar, producer

"Mama Tried"

- Eddie Bayers - drums
- Mike Brignardello - bass guitar
- Ricky Cobble - asisstant, mixing
- Dan Dugmore - steel guitar
- Koji Egawa - assistant
- Rich Hanson - assistant
- Aubrey Haynie - fiddle
- Julian King - recording
- George Marinelli - electric guitar
- Abbe Nameche - production coordinator
- Doug Rich - production coordinator
- Matt Rollings - piano
- John Saylor - assistant
- Bill Schnee - additional recording
- James Stroud - producer
- Randy Travis - vocals, producer
- Cindy Walker - background vocals
- Biff Watson - acoustic guitar
- Curtis Young - background vocals

"Wine, Women, and Song"

- Chuck Ainlay - recording, mixing
- Eddie Bayers - drums
- Steve Crowder - assistant
- Stuart Duncan - fiddle
- Steve Gibson - electric guitar
- Vince Gill - producer
- John Hughey - steel guitar
- Patty Loveless - vocals
- Russ Martin - additional recording
- Rob McMillan - assistant
- Jessie Noble - production coordinator
- Mark Ralston - assistant
- Hargus "Pig" Robbins - piano
- Randy Scruggs - acoustic guitar
- Dawn Sears - background vocals
- Jeff White - background vocals
- Glenn Worf - bass guitar

"I Never Go Around Mirrors"

- Trace Adkins - vocals, producer
- Kenny Beard - background vocals
- Mike Bradley - recording, mixing
- Stephen Byam - steel guitar, Dobro
- Mark Capps - assistant
- Joey Click - bass guitar
- Deryl Dodd - background vocals
- Mark Horne - acoustic guitar
- John Kunz - production coordinator
- Bob Mummert - drums
- Scott Neubert - electric guitar
- Joe Spivey - fiddle
- Thomas Zeleznik - piano

"Oh Lonesome Me"

- Chuck Ainlay - recording, mixing
- Chet Atkins - electric guitar, producer
- Mary Chapin Carpenter - acoustic guitar, vocals
- Clarissa Cater - production coordinator
- Chad Cromwell - drums
- Vince Gill - electric guitar
- Tony Green - engineering
- Clark Hagen - additional recording
- Mark Knopfler - electric guitar, backing vocals
- Jason Piske - additional recording
- Mark Ralston - assistant
- Hargus "Pig" Robbins - keyboards
- John Sayler - assistant
- Glenn Worf - upright bass
- Steve Wariner - electric guitar
- Paul Yandell - acoustic guitar

"Behind Closed Doors"

- Mike Bradley - recording, mixing
- Mark Capps - assistant
- Joe Diffie - vocals, producer
- Paul Franklin - steel guitar
- Carl Gorodetzky - string contractor
- Brent Mason - electric guitar
- Nashville String Machine - strings
- Matt Rollings - keyboards
- Stacey Slate Easterling - production coordinator
- Johnny Slate - producer
- Monica Stiles - background vocals
- Billy Joe Walker Jr. - acoustic guitar
- Bergen White - string arrangement
- Hank Williams - digital editing
- Glenn Worf - bass guitar

"She's Actin' Single (I'm Drinkin' Doubles)"

- Bruce Bouton - steel guitar
- Mike Bradley - mixing, recording
- Mark Capps - assistant
- Mark Casstevens - acoustic guitar
- Don Cook - producer
- Larry Franklin - fiddle
- Wade Hayes - lead and background vocals, electric guitar
- Wes Hightower - background vocals
- John Barlow Jarvis - piano, keyboards
- Scott Johnson - production coordinator
- John Kunz - digital editing
- Liana Manis - background vocals
- Brent Mason - electric guitar
- Chick Raines - associate producer
- Michael Rhodes - bass guitar
- Dennis Wilson - background vocals
- Lonnie Wilson - drums

"'Til I Can Make It on My Own"

- Deb Boyle - production coordinator
- Joe Chemay - bass guitar
- Tony Green - assistant
- Erik Hellerman - assistant
- B. James Lowry - acoustic guitar
- Brent Mason - electric guitar
- Martina McBride - lead and background vocals, producer
- Steve Nathan - piano
- Clarke Schleicher - recording, mixing
- Robby Turner - steel guitar
- Lonnie Wilson - drums
- Paul Worley - producer

"Cold, Cold Heart"

- Deb Boyle - production coordinator
- Mike Bradley - additional recording
- Larry Byrom - electric guitar
- Joe Chemay - bass guitar, background vocals
- Larry Franklin - fiddle
- Sonny Garrish - steel guitar
- Tony Green - assistant
- Brian Hardin - assistant
- Ginny Johnson - production coordinator
- John Kunz -assistant
- Paul Leim - drums
- Gene Miller - background vocals
- Steve Nathan - piano
- Collin Raye - vocals, producer
- Clarke Schleicher - mixing
- Steve Tillisch - recording
- Biff Watson - acoustic guitar
- Billy Joe Walker Jr. - producer, acoustic guitar, electric guitar
- Paul Worley - producer

"The Three Bells"

- Larry Atamanuik - drums
- Chet Atkins - producer
- Barry Bales - upright bass, background vocals
- Ron Block - acoustic guitar
- Clarissa Cater - production coordinator
- Thomas Johnson - assistant, recording
- Alison Krauss - lead vocals, background vocals, strings
- Hank Nirider - assistant
- Gary Paczosa - recording, mixing
- Hargus "Pig" Robbins - keyboards
- Dan Tyminski - acoustic guitar, background vocals

"City Lights"

- Eddie Bayers - drums
- Steve Buckingham - producer
- Jennie Carey - production coordinator
- Paul Franklin - steel guitar
- Steve Gibson - electric guitar
- Doug Johnson - producer
- Anthony Martin - assistant
- Marshall Morgan - mixing
- Michael Rhodes - bass guitar
- Matt Rollings - piano
- John Wesley Ryles - background vocals
- Ed Seay - recording
- Toby Seay - assistant
- Joe Spivey - fiddle
- Rick Trevino - vocals

"Honky Tonk Heroes (Like Me)"

- Deb Boyle - production coordinator
- Mike Bradley - recording, mixing
- Joe Chemay - bass guitar
- J.T. Corenflos - electric guitar
- Joe Diffie - vocals, producer
- Sonny Garrish - steel guitar
- Aubrey Haynie - fiddle
- John Barlow Jarvis - piano
- John Kunz - assistant
- Collin Raye - vocals, producer
- Biff Watson - acoustic guitar
- Lonnie Wilson - drums

"Gone Out of My Mind"

- Eddie Bayers - drums
- Joe Chemay - bass guitar, background vocals
- J.T. Corenflos - electric guitar
- Glen Duncan - fiddle
- Paul Franklin - steel guitar
- John Guess - producer
- John Hobbs - piano
- Jerry Kennedy - producer
- Liana Manis - background vocals
- Doug Stone - vocals
- Biff Watson - acoustic guitar

"Same Old Train"

- Jerry Abbott - piano, engineering
- Steve Arnold - bass guitar
- Clint Black - vocals
- Nick Brophy - recording
- Bob Burns - upright bass
- Brad Davis - acoustic guitar
- Joe Diffie - vocals
- Jerry Douglas - Dobro
- Glen Duncan - fiddle
- Stuart Duncan - viola, fiddle
- Pam Erwin - recording
- Merle Haggard - vocals
- Emmylou Harris - vocals
- Mark Harvey - recording
- Gary Hogue - steel guitar
- Alison Krauss - vocals
- Patty Loveless - vocals
- Maria-Elena Orbea - production coordinator
- Earl Scruggs - vocals, banjo
- Ricky Skaggs - vocals
- Gregg Stocki - drums
- Marty Stuart - vocals, producer, acoustic guitar, electric guitar, mandolin
- Ernie Sykes - upright bass
- Jamie Tate - recording, mixing
- Pam Tillis - vocals
- Randy Travis - vocals
- Travis Tritt - vocals
- Dwight Yoakam - vocals

All tracks

- Bill Brunt Designs - logo design
- Don Cobb - digital editing
- Paige Conners - project coordinator
- Carlos Grier - digital editing
- Margie Hunt - executive producer
- Bill Johnson - art direction
- Mike Kraski - executive producer
- Denny Purcell - mastering
- Laura Putty - sequencing
- Jonathan Russell - assistant
- Rollow Welch - art direction

Photography

- Matt Barnes
- Gwendolyn Cates
- Lester Cohen
- Jeff Kravitz
- Harry Langdon
- Bret Lopez
- Alan Messer
- John Lee Montgomery III
- Norman Seeff
- Rollow Welch

== Chart performance ==
Chart (1998)	Peak position
US Top Country Albums (Billboard)	36
