= In Another World (Joe Diffie song) =

Single by Joe Diffie

from the album In Another World
- Released: July 23, 2001
- Genre: Country
- Length: 3:46
- Label: Monument Nashville
- Songwriters: Tom Shapiro; Wally Wilson; Jimmy Yeary
- Producers: Don Cook; Lonnie Wilson

Joe Diffie singles chronology
"It's Always Somethin'" (2000)	"In Another World" (2001)	"This Pretender" (2002)

"In Another World" is a song written by Tom Shapiro, Wally Wilson and Jimmy Yeary, and recorded by American country music singer Joe Diffie. It was released in July 2001 as the first single and title track from his album In Another World. The song became Diffie's twenty-sixth Top 40 country hit, as well as his seventeenth and last Top Ten hit of his career.

== Critical reception ==
William Ruhlmann of Allmusic, in his review of In Another World, said that the song was not one of the better tracks on the album. He called it "a wistful reflection on lost love, but a bit sketchy". Country Weekly critic Mark Marymont gave a more favorable review, saying that it was "a shimmering ballad perfect for his expressive tenor".

== Chart performance ==
"In Another World" debuted at number 60 on the U.S. Billboard Hot Country Singles & Tracks for the week of July 28, 2001. The song charted on the Billboard Hot Country Singles & Tracks chart for thirty-four weeks, peaking at number 10 on the chart week of February 23, 2002. It also peaked at number 66 on the Billboard Hot 100.

Chart (2001–2002)	Peak position
US Hot Country Songs (Billboard)	10
US Billboard Hot 100	66

=== Year-end charts ===
Chart (2002)	Position
US Country Songs (Billboard)	51

== Other versions ==
Chris Young covered the song on Hardy's 2024 mixtape, Hixtape: Vol. 3: Difftape.
