= Tougher Than Nails (song) =

Single by Joe Diffie

from the album Tougher Than Nails
- Released: January 2004
- Recorded: 2003
- Genre: Country
- Length: 3:10
- Label: Broken Bow
- Songwriters: Phil O'Donnell, Kendell Marvel, Max T. Barnes
- Producers: Joe Diffie, Lonnie Wilson

Joe Diffie singles chronology
"This Pretender" (2002)	"Tougher Than Nails" (2004)	"If I Could Only Bring You Back" (2004)

"Tougher Than Nails" is a song written by Phil O'Donnell, Kendell Marvel and Max T. Barnes, and recorded by American country music artist Joe Diffie. It was released in January 2004 as the first single and title track from the album Tougher Than Nails. The song reached number 19 on the Billboard Hot Country Singles & Tracks chart, becoming Diffie's last hit on that chart.

== Chart performance ==
Chart (2004)	Peak position
US Hot Country Songs (Billboard)	19
US Bubbling Under Hot 100 (Billboard)	10
