= C-O-U-N-T-R-Y =

Single by Joe Diffie

from the album Life's So Funny
- B-side: "Third Rock from the Sun"
- Released: March 2, 1996
- Genre: Country
- Length: 2:38
- Label: Epic
- Songwriter(s): Dusty Drake, Ed Hill, Ron Harbin
- Producer(s): Johnny Slate, Joe Diffie

Joe Diffie singles chronology
"Leroy the Redneck Reindeer" (1995)	"C-O-U-N-T-R-Y" (1996)	"Whole Lotta Gone" (1996)

"C-O-U-N-T-R-Y" is a song recorded by American country music artist Joe Diffie. It was released in March 1996 as the second single from the 1995 album Life's So Funny. It reached No. 23 on the Billboard Hot Country Singles & Tracks chart. The song was written by Dusty Drake, Ed Hill and Ron Harbin.

== Chart performance ==
Chart (1996)	Peak position
US Hot Country Songs (Billboard)	23
Canadian RPM Country Tracks	27

== Other versions ==
Aaron Tippin and Ernest covered the song on Hardy's 2024 mixtape, Hixtape: Vol. 3: Difftape.
