= Pickup Man =

1994 single by Joe Diffie

Single by Joe Diffie

from the album Third Rock from the Sun
- B-side: "From Here on Out"
- Released: October 17, 1994
- Genre: Country
- Length: 3:36
- Label: Epic
- Songwriters: Howard Perdew; Kerry Kurt Phillips
- Producers: Johnny Slate; Bob Montgomery

Joe Diffie singles chronology
"Third Rock from the Sun" (1994)	"Pickup Man" (1994)	"So Help Me Girl" (1995)

"Pickup Man" is a song written by Howard Perdew and Kerry Kurt Phillips, and recorded by American country music artist Joe Diffie. It was released in October 1994 as the second single from the album Third Rock from the Sun. The song was his longest-lasting number-one hit, having spent four weeks at number one on the Billboard Hot Country Singles & Tracks (now Hot Country Songs) chart between December 1994 and January 1995.

== Content ==
The song, a moderate up-tempo, is about a man who reasons he can meet the woman of his dreams by driving a pickup truck. At one point, he is able to secure a ride for a high school homecoming queen. "Pickup man", in this sense, has a double meaning — i.e., he is not only driving a pickup truck, but he is also "picking up" women in it.

== Music video ==
The music video was directed by Deaton-Flanigen Productions. The majority of the music video for this song was filmed on location at a drive-in theater in Lewisburg, Tennessee.

The dead man from the "Prop Me Up Beside the Jukebox (If I Die)" music video makes a cameo, lounging in the bed of a pickup truck.

== Personnel ==
Compiled from the liner notes.

- Joe Diffie – lead and background vocals
- Stuart Duncan – fiddle
- Paul Franklin – steel guitar
- Brent Mason – electric guitar
- Larry Paxton – bass guitar
- Matt Rollings – piano
- Billy Joe Walker Jr. – acoustic guitar
- Lonnie Wilson – drums

== Chart positions ==
"Pickup Man" debuted at number 56 on the US Billboard Hot Country Singles & Tracks chart for the week of October 22, 1994.

=== Weekly charts ===
Chart (1994–1995)	Peak position
Canada Country Singles (RPM)	9
US Billboard Hot 100	60
US Hot Country Songs (Billboard)	1

=== Year-end charts ===
Chart (1995)	Position
US Country Songs (Billboard)	66

== In popular culture ==
In 2005, a rewritten version of "Pickup Man" was used in television commercials for the restaurant chain Applebee's, to promote their "Carside to Go" service.

Country singer Jason Aldean's top 20 single "1994", a tribute to Diffie which appeared on Aldean's 2012 album Night Train, references "Pickup Man" in the chorus.

"Pickup Man" would become one of the songs featured Grand Theft Auto VI's Back Country Radio station.

== Post Malone version ==
"Pickup Man"

Single by Joe Diffie featuring Post Malone

from the album Hixtape: Vol. 3: Difftape
- B-side: "John Deere Green"
- Released: November 9, 2023
- Genre: Country
- Length: 3:36
- Label: Big Loud; Mercury Records Nashville
- Songwriters: Howard Perdew; Kerry Kurt Phillips
- Producers: Lonnie Wilson; Diffie; Joey Moi

Joe Diffie singles chronology
"Quit You" (2018)	"Pickup Man" (2023)

Post Malone singles chronology
"Enough Is Enough" (2023)	"Pickup Man" (2023)	"Fortnight" (2024)

In November 2023, Post Malone covered the song with Morgan Wallen and Hardy at the Country Music Association awards ceremony. Following this performance, a studio recording featuring Post Malone alongside a vocal track recorded by Diffie in 2006 debuted on the country music charts. This rendition is the lead single to Hardy's mixtape Hixtape Vol. 3, which includes covers of Joe Diffie songs.

=== Charts ===
Chart (2023–2024)	Peak position
Canada Hot 100 (Billboard)	80
Canada Country (Billboard)	57
US Bubbling Under Hot 100 (Billboard)	5
US Country Airplay (Billboard)	44
US Hot Country Songs (Billboard)	34
