= Casey Kelly (songwriter) =

American songwriter and musician

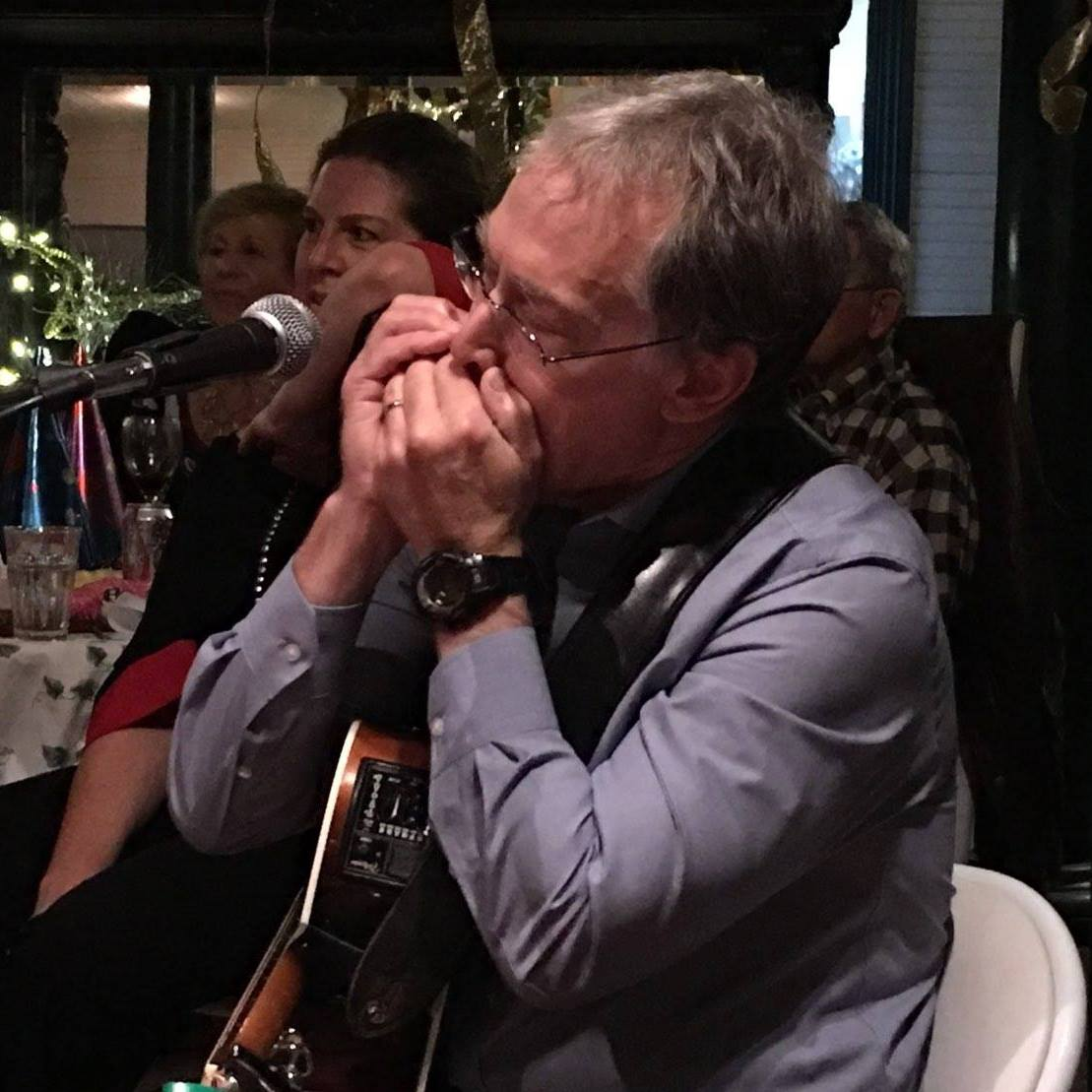
- Casey Kelly the Performer and Multi-Instrumentalist

Background information
- Born: Baton Rouge, Louisiana, United States
- Genres: Rock, Folk music, country
- Occupations: Songwriter, musician
- Instruments: Vocals, guitar, harmonica, piano
- Years active: 1966–Present
- Website: caseykelly.net

Casey Kelly is an American songwriter and musician.

Kelly has written several Grammy-nominated songs. His many hits include four Top Ten Country Music Hits: "Anyone Who Isn't Me Tonight" by Kenny Rogers and Dottie West (Grammy Nominated), "Soon" by Tanya Tucker (Grammy Nominated), "Somewhere Down the Line" by T G Shepherd and country music standard, "The Cowboy Rides Away" by George Strait. He works as a session player and singer and performs in clubs and concerts for audiences throughout the US and Europe. A frequent mentor, panelist and workshop contributor, Casey is a member of ASCAP, NSAI the Songwriters Guild of America Board of Councilors. The Complete Idiot's Guide to the Art of Songwriting is his first published book.

== Music career ==
Kelly began his career performing in Baton Rouge with a local group known as the Greek Fountains. He then moved to New York City to work as a session musician and singer, songwriter, arranger, music publisher, record producer and record company executive. He toured with Tom Rush, playing guitar, harmonica, and piano and then went to Los Angeles where he signed a recording deal with producer Joe Wissert through Warner Brothers Records. After releasing a single at Warner Brothers Records he moved on to A&M Records and formed the Luziana Band which was recorded by Jim Hilton.

His next label deal was at Elektra Records where he worked with producer Richard Sanford Orshoff, recording two nationally acclaimed LP's, "Casey Kelly" and "For Sale". He toured extensively opening shows and performing with various acts including America and Frank Zappa.

== Songwriting career ==
Recruited by famous publisher/producer Bob Montgomery, Kelly moved to Nashville in 1978, where he has lived ever since writing songs for many of the major publishers and artists. In addition to his top ten country hits, he also wrote “That Road Not Taken” by Joe Diffie, "Only Game in Town" by America and "Resign Yourself" by the Nitty Gritty Dirt Band. He also had a radio hit with his own song "Poor Boy".

== Chart singles ==
The following is a list of Casey Kelly compositions that were chart hits.

Year	Single Title	Recording Artist	Chart Positions
Year	Single Title	Recording Artist	Billboard Country
1978	Anyone Who Isn't Me Tonight co-written with Julie Didier	Kenny Rogers and Dottie West	2
1984	Somewhere Down the Line co-written with Lewis Anderson	T.G. Sheppard	3
1985	The Cowboy Rides Away co-written with Sonny Throckmorton	George Strait	5
1993	Soon co-written with Bob Regan	Tanya Tucker	2
1995	That Road Not Taken co-written with Deborah Beasley	Joe Diffie	40

== Recordings by Casey Kelly ==
- 1972: "Casey Kelly" – Casey Kelly
- 1973: "For Sale" – Casey Kelly
- 1995: "Himownself: The Hits" - Casey Kelly
- 2017: "The Long Road to You" - Kelly&Ellis (Casey Kelly and Leslie Ellis)

== Books Written by Casey Kelly ==
In 2011, Kelly and co-writer David Hodge released a self-help text for songwriters entitled The Complete Idiot's Guide to the Art of Songwriting.
