= I'm in Love with a Capital "U" =

Single by Joe Diffie

from the album Third Rock from the Sun
- B-side: "Wild Blue Yonder"
- Released: May 27, 1995
- Genre: Country
- Length: 3:17
- Label: Epic
- Songwriter(s): Paul Nelson, Craig Wiseman
- Producer(s): Johnny Slate, Joe Diffie

Joe Diffie singles chronology
"So Help Me Girl" (1995)	"I'm in Love with a Capital "U"" (1995)	"That Road Not Taken" (1995)

"I'm in Love with a Capital "U"" is a song recorded by American country music artist Joe Diffie. It was released in May 1995 as the fourth single from the album Third Rock from the Sun. The song reached #21 on the Billboard Hot Country Singles & Tracks chart. The song was written by Paul Nelson and Craig Wiseman.

== Chart performance ==
Chart (1995)	Peak position
US Hot Country Songs (Billboard)	21
Canadian RPM Country Tracks	22
