= Regular Joe (album) =

Studio album by Joe Diffie
- Released: January 14, 1992
- Recorded: 1991–1992
- Studio: The Bennett House, Franklin, TN
- Genre: Country
- Length: 34:18
- Label: Epic
- Producer: Bob Montgomery; Johnny Slate

Joe Diffie chronology
| A Thousand Winding Roads (1990) | Regular Joe (1992) | Honky Tonk Attitude (1993) |

Singles from Regular Joe
- 1. "Is It Cold in Here" Released: December 3, 1991; 2. "Ships That Don't Come In" Released: April 14, 1992; 3. "Next Thing Smokin'" Released: August 15, 1992; 4. "Startin' Over Blues" Released: December 1992

Professional ratings
Review scores
| Source | Rating |
|---|---|
| Allmusic | 4.5/5 stars |
| Christgau's Consumer Guide | (choice cut) |
| Entertainment Weekly | B+ |

Regular Joe is the second studio album by American country music artist Joe Diffie. Released in 1992, it features the singles "Is It Cold in Here", "Ships That Don't Come In", "Next Thing Smokin'", and "Startin' Over Blues". All of these except for "Startin' Over Blues" reached Top 20 on the Hot Country Songs charts. Of the album's ten tracks, Diffie co-wrote four of them, including its most successful single: "Is It Cold in Here". The album itself has been certified gold by the RIAA. The track "Goodnight Sweetheart" was recorded by David Kersh on his 1996 debut album.

== Track listing ==
| No. | Title | Writer(s) | Length |
|---|---|---|---|
| 1. | "Startin' Over Blues" | Sanger D. Shafer, Lonnie Wilson | 3:08 |
| 2. | "I Just Don't Know" | Wilson, Michael Higgins | 3:47 |
| 3. | "Next Thing Smokin'" | Joe Diffie, Danny Morrison, Johnny Slate | 3:27 |
| 4. | "Ain't That Bad Enough" | Diffie, Wilson, Ron Moore | 3:34 |
| 5. | "Ships That Don't Come In" | Paul Nelson, Dave Gibson | 3:39 |
| 6. | "Just a Regular Joe" | Howard Perdew, Diffie, Higgins | 2:38 |
| 7. | "Is It Cold in Here" | Diffie, Morrison, Kerry Kurt Phillips | 3:46 |
| 8. | "Back to Back Heartaches" | Andy Spooner, Randy Boudreaux, Phillips | 2:43 |
| 9. | "You Made Me What I Am" | Tim Mensy, Gary Harrison) | 4:17 |
| 10. | "Goodnight Sweetheart" | Kim Williams, L. David Lewis, Boudreaux | 3:21 |

== Personnel ==
- Mike Chapman - bass guitar
- Joe Diffie - lead vocals, background vocals
- Jerry Douglas - Dobro
- Paul Franklin - steel guitar
- Vince Gill - background vocals
- Rob Hajacos - fiddle
- Bill Hullett - acoustic guitar
- Brent Mason - electric guitar
- Tim Mensy - acoustic guitar
- Dave Pomeroy - bass guitar
- Lonnie Wilson - drums, background vocals

== Chart performance ==
| Chart (1992) | Peak position |
|---|---|
| U.S. Billboard Top Country Albums | 22 |
| U.S. Billboard 200 | 132 |
| Canadian RPM Country Albums | 25 |
