= Whole Lotta Gone =

Single by Joe Diffie

from the album Life's So Funny
- B-side: "Back to the Cave"
- Released: June 22, 1996
- Genre: Country
- Length: 2:59
- Label: Epic
- Songwriter(s): Keith Burns, Mark James Oliverius
- Producer(s): Johnny Slate, Joe Diffie

Joe Diffie singles chronology
"C-O-U-N-T-R-Y" (1996)	"Whole Lotta Gone" (1996)	"This Is Your Brain" (1997)

"Whole Lotta Gone" is a song recorded by American country music artist Joe Diffie. It was released in June 1996 as the third single from the album Life's So Funny. The song reached #23 on the Billboard Hot Country Singles & Tracks chart. The song was written by Keith Burns and Mark James Oliverius.

== Chart performance ==
Chart (1996)	Peak position
US Hot Country Songs (Billboard)	23
Canadian RPM Country Tracks	21
