= In My Own Backyard =

Single by Joe Diffie

from the album Honky Tonk Attitude
- B-side: "Here Comes That Town"
- Released: February 28, 1994
- Genre: Country
- Length: 3:39
- Label: Epic
- Songwriters: Joe Diffie, Kerry Kurt Phillips, Andy Spooner
- Producers: Johnny Slate, Bob Montgomery

Joe Diffie singles chronology
"John Deere Green" (1993)	"In My Own Backyard" (1994)	"Third Rock from the Sun" (1994)

"In My Own Backyard" is a song co-written and recorded by American country music artist Joe Diffie. It was released in February 1994 as the fourth single from the album Honky Tonk Attitude. The song reached number 19 on the U.S. Billboard Hot Country Singles & Tracks chart and peaked at number 10 on the RPM Country Tracks in Canada. The song was written by Diffie, Kerry Kurt Phillips and Andy Spooner.

== Music video ==
The music video was directed by Richard Jernigan and premiered in early 1994.

== Chart performance ==
"In My Own Backyard" debuted at number 54 on the U.S. Billboard Hot Country Singles & Tracks for the week of March 12, 1994.

Chart (1994)	Peak position
Canada Country Singles (RPM)	10
US Hot Country Songs (Billboard)	19
