= That Road Not Taken =

Single by Joe Diffie

from the album Third Rock from the Sun
- B-side: "The Cows Come Home"
- Released: August 12, 1995
- Genre: Country
- Length: 4:17
- Label: Epic
- Songwriters: Deborah Beasley, Casey Kelly
- Producers: Johnny Slate, Joe Diffie

Joe Diffie singles chronology
| "I'm in Love with a Capital "U"" (1995) | "That Road Not Taken" (1995) | "Bigger Than the Beatles" (1995) |

"That Road Not Taken" is a song recorded by American country music artist Joe Diffie. It was released in August 1995 as the fifth and final single from his 1994 album Third Rock from the Sun. The song reached #40 on the Billboard Hot Country Singles & Tracks chart. The song was written by Deborah Beasley and Casey Kelly.

== Content ==
The song is a ballad in which the narrator ponders the outcome of a relationship that he did not pursue.

== Critical reception ==
A review in Cash Box magazine was favorable, stating that "Diffie has found his niche. He is never more convincing than when singing this type of song."

== Chart performance ==
| Chart (1995) | Peak position |
|---|---|
| US Hot Country Songs (Billboard) | 40 |
| Canadian RPM Country Tracks | 41 |
