= Next Thing Smokin' =

Single by Joe Diffie

from the album Regular Joe
- B-side: "I Just Don't Know"
- Released: August 15, 1992
- Genre: Country
- Length: 3:27
- Label: Epic
- Songwriters: Joe Diffie, Danny Morrison, Johnny Slate
- Producers: Bob Montgomery, Johnny Slate

Joe Diffie singles chronology
| "Ships That Don't Come In" (1992) | "Next Thing Smokin'" (1992) | "Not Too Much to Ask" (1992) |

"Next Thing Smokin'" is a song co-written and recorded by American country music artist Joe Diffie. It was released in August 1992 as the third single from the album Regular Joe. The song reached #16 on the Billboard Hot Country Singles & Tracks chart. The song was written by Diffie, Danny Morrison and Johnny Slate.

== Critical reception ==
Deborah Evans Price of Billboard gave the song a positive review, saying that Diffie "keeps strong vocal tempo with a tune of hot pickin', fiddlin', and piano ticklin'."

== Chart performance ==
The song debuted at number 60 on the Hot Country Singles & Tracks chart dated August 7, 1992. It charted for 20 weeks on that chart, reaching its peak of number 16 on the chart dated October 17, 1992, making it Diffie's first single to miss the Top 10 on the country charts.

=== Charts ===
| Chart (1992) | Peak position |
|---|---|
| Canada Country Singles (RPM) | 17 |
| US Hot Country Songs (Billboard) | 16 |
