= Homecoming: The Bluegrass Album =

Studio album by Joe Diffie
- Released: October 25, 2010
- Genre: Bluegrass
- Label: Rounder
- Producer: Luke Wooten; Joe Diffie

Joe Diffie chronology
Tougher Than Nails (2004)	Homecoming: The Bluegrass Album (2010)	All in the Same Boat (2013)

Homecoming: The Bluegrass Album is the eleventh studio album and first bluegrass album by American country music singer Joe Diffie, released on October 25, 2010, through Rounder Records. It was Diffie's final solo album to be released during his lifetime.

== Critical reception ==
AllMusic reviewer j. poet gave the album three-and-a-half stars out of five, saying that "there's not a weak track here".

== Track listing ==
No.	Title	Writer(s)	Length
1.	"Somehow Tonight"	Earl Scruggs	2:59
2.	"Lonesome and Dry as a Bone"	Shawn Camp; Matt Lindsey; Mel Tillis Jr.	3:53
3.	"Tall Cornstalk"	Camp; Harley Allen	2:48
4.	"Fit for a King"	Carl Jackson; Jim Rushing	4:12
5.	"Route 5 Box 109"	Galen Griffin; Kerry Kurt Phillips	3:58
6.	"Rainin' on Her Rubber Dolly" (featuring The Grascals)	Joe Diffie; Camp	2:55
7.	"I Know How It Feels"	Larry Cordle; Rusty Morrell	3:40
8.	"Tennessee Tea"	Diffie; Billy Joe Foster	2:52
9.	"Free and Easy"	Allen	3:01
10.	"Stormy Weather Once Again"	Camp; Jimmy Stewart	3:03
11.	"'Til Death"	Diffie; Steven Pippin	4:29
12.	"Hard to Handle"	Alvertis Bell; Allen Jones; Otis Redding	2:30

== Personnel ==
- Harley Allen - background vocals
- Mike Compton - mandolin
- Charlie Cushman - banjo
- Joe Diffie - lead vocals, background vocals
- Mark Fain - upright bass
- Aubrey Haynie - fiddle
- Rob Ickes - Dobro
- Sonya Isaacs - background vocals
- Carl Jackson - background vocals
- Alecia Nugent - background vocals
- Michael L. Rogers - background vocals
- James B. Stewart - background vocals
- Monica Stiles - background vocals
- Bryan Sutton - acoustic guitar
- Rhonda Vincent - background vocals
- Bradley Walker - background vocals

== Chart performance ==
Chart (2010)	Peak position
U.S. Billboard Top Bluegrass Albums	10
