= Third Rock from the Sun (song) =

Single by Joe Diffie

from the album Third Rock from the Sun
- Released: July 4, 1994
- Genre: Country
- Length: 3:06 (album version); 2:48 (radio version); 5:00 (dance mix)
- Label: Epic
- Songwriters: Sterling Whipple, Tony Martin, John Greenebaum
- Producers: Joe Diffie, Johnny Slate

Joe Diffie singles chronology
"In My Own Backyard" (1994)	"Third Rock from the Sun" (1994)	"Pickup Man" (1994)

"Third Rock from the Sun" is a song written by Sterling Whipple, Tony Martin and John Greenebaum, and recorded by American country music artist Joe Diffie. It was released in July 1994 as the lead single and title track from his album Third Rock from the Sun. The song became Diffie's third Number One single on the Hot Country Singles & Tracks (now Hot Country Songs) chart. The song also became his first number one hit since "If the Devil Danced (In Empty Pockets)" in 1991.

== Content ==
An elaborate story begins in a small town with a woman entering a local bar “one hip at a time” (suggesting her attractiveness); an initially unidentified married man decides to make advances on her and phones his wife at home to inform her that he is (falsely) working late. Instantly suspecting that he is cheating on her, the jilted wife phones her sister to ask for emotional support. The sister's boyfriend then departs to a nearby convenience store for some alcoholic beverages, but leaves his vehicle running while making his purchases. This, in turn, leads to several teenagers stealing his car and going on a joyride that culminates in a spectacular crash that causes a power outage to the entire town and appears to an observing waitress to be a UFO. The story comes full circle when town officials cannot locate the police chief — who is revealed to be the man at the bar whose attempted adultery triggered the chain of events in the first place.

The moral of the story is that, as stated in the chorus, "when (Earth is) spinning 'round, things come undone/Welcome to Earth, third rock from the Sun."

The radio version omits the vocoded "Welcome to Earth, third rock from the sun" intro and outro with police sirens. It's included on Diffie's first Greatest Hits album.

The extended version features a vocoded version of the fourth verse.

== Critical reception ==
Deborah Evans Price of Billboard magazine reviewed the song unfavorably, saying that the title is ripped off from Jimi Hendrix (Third Stone from the Sun) and the "twisted plot falls somewhere between "Smokey and the Bandit" and Back to the Future." She goes on to say that the song "somehow manages to obscure even Diffie's world-class voice in a confusing avalanche of lyrics." Jim Ridley of New Country magazine described the song with favor, saying that the song was "the funniest and most jaw-dropping string of calamaties...since Bo Diddley bungled his way through 'Cops and Robbers'."

== Music video ==
The music video was directed by Roger Pistole and premiered in mid-1994, which uses the album version of the song. It starts and ends with a static slideshow of the Earth's formation with the vocoded intro of the main line of the chorus (it is used again at the end of the song, with police sirens). It then shows Diffie performing with his band in a pub, and by himself on top of a huge globe in a field, while scenes relating to the song's storyline take place.

The dead man from the Prop Me Up Beside the Jukebox (If I Die) video makes a cameo, now propped up beside a liquor store.

== Personnel ==
Compiled from the liner notes.

- Lee Bogan – background vocals
- Walt Cunningham – electric keyboards
- Joe Diffie – lead and background vocals
- Craig "Flash" Fletcher – background vocals
- Paul Franklin – steel guitar
- Brent Mason – electric guitar
- Matt Rollings – piano
- Billy Joe Walker Jr. – acoustic guitar
- Lonnie Wilson – drums, percussion
- Glenn Worf – bass guitar

== Chart positions ==
"Third Rock from the Sun" debuted at number 53 on the U.S. Billboard Hot Country Singles & Tracks for the week of July 16, 1994.

Chart (1994)	Peak position
Canada Country Singles (RPM)	1
US Billboard Hot 100	84
US Hot Country Songs (Billboard)	1

=== Year-end charts ===
Chart (1994)	Position
Canada Country Tracks (RPM)	23
US Country Songs (Billboard)	3

== Parodies ==
- American country music parody artist Cledus T. Judd released a parody of "Third Rock From the Sun" titled "Third Rock From Her Thumb" on his 1998 album "Did I Shave My Back For This?"

== Other versions ==
Blake Shelton and Brooks & Dunn covered the song with Hardy on his 2024 mixtape, Hixtape: Vol. 3: Difftape.
