= Is It Cold in Here =

Single by Joe Diffie

from the album Regular Joe
- B-side: "Back to Back Heartache"
- Released: December 3, 1991
- Genre: Country
- Length: 3:46
- Label: Epic
- Songwriters: Joe Diffie, Danny Morrison, Kerry Kurt Phillips
- Producers: Johnny Slate, Bob Montgomery

Joe Diffie singles chronology
"New Way (To Light Up an Old Flame)" (1991)	"Is It Cold in Here" (1991)	"Ships That Don't Come In" (1992)

"Is It Cold In Here" is a song co-written and recorded by American country music singer Joe Diffie that reached the Top Five on the Billboard Hot Country Singles & Tracks (now Hot Country Songs) chart. It was released in December 1991 as the first single from his album Regular Joe. The song was written by Diffie, Kerry Kurt Phillips and Danny Morrison.

== Chart performance ==
The song debuted at number 65 on the Hot Country Singles & Tracks chart dated December 7, 1991. It charted for 20 weeks on that chart, reaching its peak of number 5 on the country chart dated February 21, 1992.

=== Charts ===
Chart (1991–1992)	Peak position
Canada Country Singles (RPM)	4
US Hot Country Songs (Billboard)	5

=== Year-end charts ===
Chart (1992)	Position
Canada Country Tracks (RPM)	70
US Hot Country Songs (Billboard)	47
