= Prop Me Up Beside the Jukebox (If I Die) =

Single by Joe Diffie

from the album Honky Tonk Attitude
- B-side: "I Can Walk the Line (If It Ain't Too Straight)"
- Released: July 19, 1993
- Genre: Country
- Length: 3:47 (album version); 3:16 (radio edit)
- Label: Epic
- Songwriters: Howard Perdew, Rick Blaylock, Kerry Kurt Phillips
- Producers: Bob Montgomery, Johnny Slate

Joe Diffie singles chronology
"Honky Tonk Attitude" (1993)	"Prop Me Up Beside the Jukebox (If I Die)" (1993)	"John Deere Green" (1993)

"Prop Me Up Beside the Jukebox (If I Die)" is a song written by Kerry Kurt Phillips, Howard Perdew and Rick Blaylock, and recorded by American country music singer Joe Diffie. It was released in July 1993 as the second single from his CD Honky Tonk Attitude. It peaked at number 3 on the Billboard Hot Country Singles & Tracks (now Hot Country Songs) chart.

== Content ==
The song begins at a slow pace accompanied by piano, with the narrator explaining that he has no fear of dying, but that he wants to go on being himself after he has died. After the introduction, the tempo increases and the narrator elaborates on his initial point, by stating that he wishes to have his body placed against a jukebox should he die, so that he will still be in a familiar atmosphere after death. The radio edit omits one repetition of the chorus.

== Lawsuit ==
In 1999, the song was part of a lawsuit when another songwriter named Everett Ellis attempted to sue the writers of "Prop Me Up Beside the Jukebox", as he thought that the song infringed on a copyright to his own composition, "Lay Me Out by the Jukebox When I Die".

== Music video ==
The music video for the song begins with two men smuggling a fully dressed male corpse out of a funeral home. They proceed to take it out for a night on the town. The night of fun ends with the now-abandoned corpse (wearing sunglasses and a party hat) propped up next to the jukebox. Diffie (who plays the song at the bar) walks up to the corpse afterwards, thinking it's a living person, and tells him that, since its closing time, he needs to leave... adding "you don't have to go home, but you can't stay here". Diffie then claps the corpse on his shoulder and leaves. The corpse begins to sway and collapses next to the jukebox. The video has been described as "Weekend at Bernie's goes country" (The sequel had been released the same month as the single). The dead man became a recurring gag in Diffie's music videos, as he also makes appearances in the music videos for "Third Rock from the Sun", "Pickup Man", and "Bigger Than the Beatles".

== Chart positions ==
"Prop Me Up Beside the Jukebox (If I Die)" debuted on the U.S. Billboard Hot Country Singles & Tracks for the week of July 24, 1993.

Chart (1993)	Peak position
Canada Country Singles (RPM)	2
US Bubbling Under Hot 100 (Billboard)	22
US Hot Country Songs (Billboard)	3

=== Year-end charts ===
Chart (1993)	Position
Canada Country Tracks (RPM)	26
US Country Songs (Billboard)	13

== Other versions ==
Lainey Wilson, Tracy Lawrence & The Difftones covered the song on Hardy's 2024 mixtape, Hixtape: Vol. 3: Difftape.
