= Ships That Don't Come In =

Single by Joe Diffie

from the album Regular Joe
- B-side: "Startin' Over Blues"
- Released: April 14, 1992
- Genre: Country
- Length: 3:39
- Label: Epic
- Songwriters: Paul Nelson, Dave Gibson
- Producers: Johnny Slate, Bob Montgomery

Joe Diffie singles chronology
"Is It Cold in Here" (1991)	"Ships That Don't Come In" (1992)	"Next Thing Smokin'" (1992)

"Ships That Don't Come In" is a song recorded by American country music singer Joe Diffie that reached the Top 5 on the Billboard Hot Country Singles & Tracks (now Hot Country Songs) chart in 1992. It was released in April 1992 as the second single from his album Regular Joe. The song was written by Paul Nelson and Dave Gibson the latter of whom was also recording for Epic as a member of the Gibson/Miller Band at the time.

== Content ==
The song features two men philosophizing about the nature of life while having a conversation at a bar.

== Music video ==
The music video was directed by Jack Cole and premiered in mid-1992.

== Chart performance ==
The song debuted at number 68 on the Hot Country Singles & Tracks chart dated April 18, 1992. It charted for 20 weeks on that chart, reaching its peak of number 5 on the chart dated July 11, 1992.

Chart (1992)	Peak position
Canada Country Singles (RPM)	3
US Hot Country Songs (Billboard)	5

=== Year-end charts ===
Chart (1992)	Position
Canada Country Tracks (RPM)	55
US Country Songs (Billboard)	46

== Other versions ==
Toby Keith and Luke Combs covered the song on Hixtape: Vol. 3: Difftape. This recording was Keith's final studio recording before his death on February 5, 2024.
