= Bigger Than the Beatles =

"Bigger Than The Beatles"

Single by Joe Diffie

from the album Life's So Funny
- B-side: "Whole Lotta Gone"
- Released: November 27, 1995
- Genre: Country
- Length: 3:58
- Label: Epic
- Songwriters: Jeb Stuart Anderson, Steve Dukes
- Producers: Joe Diffie, Johnny Slate

Joe Diffie singles chronology
"That Road Not Taken" (1995)	"Bigger Than The Beatles" (1995)	"Leroy the Redneck Reindeer" (1995)

"Bigger Than The Beatles" is a song written by Jeb Stuart Anderson and Steve Dukes, and recorded by American country music artist Joe Diffie. It was released in November 1995 as the lead single from the album, Life's So Funny. The song reached Number One on the U.S. Billboard Hot Country Singles & Tracks (now Hot Country Songs) chart, becoming the fifth and final Number One single of Diffie's career. It also reached number-one on the Canadian RPM Country Tracks chart.

== Content ==
The song talks about an amateur rocker and his cocktail waitress girlfriend. The narrator talks about how they see each other as stars, since they are in love. It says, "She thinks he looks like Elvis, when he runs his fingers through his jet black hair." The narrator states that the couple has a love "bigger than the Beatles". Meaning that even though they aren't stars, they look like it to each other. The "yeah yeah yeah yeah" background chorus at the end of the song is a reference to The Beatles' "She Loves You", as well as a reference to "All You Need Is Love" in the last line of the bridge, while the title is a pun on John Lennon's controversial "bigger than Jesus" claim.

== Critical reception ==
Alanna Nash of Entertainment Weekly gave the song a C-minus rating, with her review calling it a "lighthearted tale of an amateur rocker and his shopgirl squeeze" and "just a lame device to evoke the names of beloved rock heroes."

== Music video ==
The music video was directed by Deaton-Flanigen Productions and premiered in late 1995. It depicts the male half of the couple as a karaoke singer in a club, and the female half as a waitress at the same club. The female notices the male singing and eventually goes up and duets with him. Scenes also feature the pair lounging poolside. Diffie is shown in the background singing and playing guitar in both scenes. It was filmed in Miami, Florida. The video was actually shot in Nashville with Barclay Randall and Linda Sue Simmons, playing the parts of the lounge singer and his waitress love. They had a live bigger than The Beatles.

The dead man from the Prop Me Up Beside the Jukebox (If I Die) music video makes a cameo, now lounging on a floating chair in the pool.

== Parodies ==
On his 1996 album I Stoled This Record, parodist Cledus T. Judd parodied the song as "(She's Got a Butt) Bigger Than the Beatles".

== Chart history ==
"Bigger Than the Beatles" debuted at number 58 on the U.S. Billboard Hot Country Singles & Tracks for the week of December 2, 1995.

Chart (1995–1996)	Peak position
Canada Country Singles (RPM)	1
US Hot Country Songs (Billboard)	1

=== Year-end charts ===
Chart (1996)	Position
Canada Country Tracks (RPM)	34
US Country Songs (Billboard)	19

== Other versions ==
Jon Pardi and Old Dominion covered the song on Hardy's 2024 mixtape, Hixtape: Vol. 3: Difftape.
