= Texas Size Heartache =

Single by Joe Diffie

from the album Greatest Hits
- B-side: "Poor Me"
- Released: March 23, 1998
- Genre: Country
- Length: 2:41
- Label: Epic
- Songwriters: Zack Turner; Lonnie Wilson
- Producers: Don Cook; Lonnie Wilson

Joe Diffie singles chronology
"The Promised Land" (1997)	"Texas Size Heartache" (1998)	"Poor Me" (1998)

"Texas Size Heartache" is a song written by Zack Turner and Lonnie Wilson, and recorded by American country music singer Joe Diffie. It was released in March 1998 as the first single from his Greatest Hits compilation album, for which it was one of three newly recorded songs. It reached a peak of number 4 on the country music charts in mid-1998. The song's b-side, "Poor Me," was also issued as a single later in 1998, reaching number 43 on the same chart.

== Critical reception ==
Deborah Evans Price, of Billboard magazine reviewed the song favorably, calling it an "uptempo tune marked by stellar guitar work and lots of tasty fiddle playing." On Diffie's vocals, she says that he is "in good voice, and though the lyric is lightweight, Diffie's buoyant performance and Cook's inventive production turn the song into a winner."

== Music video ==
The music video was directed by Michael Oblowitz and premiered in early 1998.

== Chart positions ==
"Texas Size Heartache" debuted at number 69 on the U.S. Billboard Hot Country Singles & Tracks for the week of April 4, 1998.

Chart (1998)	Peak position
Canada Country Singles (RPM)	15
US Hot Country Songs (Billboard)	4

=== Year-end charts ===
Chart (1998)	Position
US Country Songs (Billboard)	30
