= Honky Tonk Attitude (song) =

Single by Joe Diffie

from the album Honky Tonk Attitude
- B-side: "Just a Regular Joe"
- Released: March 8, 1993
- Genre: Country, Country blues, Country rock
- Length: 3:47 (album version); 3:26 (radio edit)
- Label: Epic
- Songwriters: Joe Diffie, Lee Bogan
- Producers: Johnny Slate, Bob Montgomery

Joe Diffie singles chronology
| "Startin' Over Blues" (1992) | "Honky Tonk Attitude" (1993) | "Prop Me Up Beside the Jukebox (If I Die)" (1993) |

"Honky Tonk Attitude" is a song co-written and recorded by American country music artist Joe Diffie. It was released in March 1993 as the lead single and title track from his album Honky Tonk Attitude. The song reached the top five of the Billboard Hot Country Singles & Tracks (now Hot Country Songs) chart and peaked at number 11 on the Canadian RPM Country Tracks chart. The song was written by Diffie and Lee Bogan.

== Content ==
The song is an uptempo in which the narrator states that everyone goes to the honky tonk to dance away their blues. He states that everyone needs to have a "honky tonk attitude".

== Music video ==
The music video was directed by Richard Jernigan and premiered in early 1993.

== Chart positions ==
"Honky Tonk Attitude" debuted on the U.S. Billboard Hot Country Singles & Tracks for the week of March 20, 1993.

| Chart (1993) | Peak position |
|---|---|
| Canada Country Singles (RPM) | 11 |
| US Hot Country Songs (Billboard) | 5 |

=== Year-end charts ===
| Chart (1993) | Position |
|---|---|
| US Country Songs (Billboard) | 50 |

== Other versions ==
Luke Bryan and Randy Houser covered the song on Hardy's 2024 mixtape, Hixtape: Vol. 3: Difftape.
