= Jimmy Yeary =

American singer-songwriter

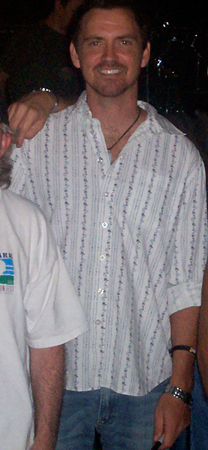
- Jimmy Yeary in July 2008.

Background information
- Born: James Earl Yeary
- Origin: Hillsboro, Ohio, U.S.
- Genre: Country
- Years active: 1994–present
- Label: Atlantic
- Formerly of: Shenandoah, The Isaacs
- Spouse: Sonya Isaacs (m. 2009)

James Earl Yeary (born in Hillsboro, Ohio) is an American country music singer and songwriter.

In 1994, Yeary moved to Nashville, Tennessee, to begin a career as a recording artist. Although he was signed to Atlantic Records, a change in label personnel prevented his debut single from being released.

Through the assistance of Paul Worley and Wally Wilson, Yeary found work as a songwriter. Among Yeary's co-writing credits are Joe Diffie's top 10 hit "In Another World", Rascal Flatts' number 1 single "Why Wait", Troy Olsen's "Summer Thing", Martina McBride's "I'm Gonna Love You Through It", Heidi Newfield's "Stay Up Late", and Lee Brice's "I Drive Your Truck". He has sung lead for Shenandoah and The Isaacs.

Yeary is married to country singer Sonya Isaacs. The couple have two sons born 2011 and 2015 and a daughter born in 2017.
