= John Deere Green =

Single by Joe Diffie

from the album Honky Tonk Attitude
- B-side: "Somewhere Under the Rainbow"
- Released: November 8, 1993
- Recorded: 1993
- Genre: Country
- Length: 4:32 (album version); 3:36 (radio edit)
- Label: Epic
- Songwriter: Dennis Linde
- Producers: Bob Montgomery; Johnny Slate

Joe Diffie singles chronology
"Prop Me Up Beside the Jukebox (If I Die)" (1993)	"John Deere Green" (1993)	"In My Own Backyard" (1994)

"John Deere Green" is a song written by Dennis Linde, and recorded by American country music artist Joe Diffie. It was released in November 1993 as the third single from his album Honky Tonk Attitude. The song peaked at number five on the country charts.

== Content ==
The song is a moderate up-tempo describing a young man named Billy Bob, who is in love with a young woman named Charlene, both of whom met in high school. One late summer evening, Billy Bob hauls a can of "John Deere green" paint to the top of a water tower and paints the words "Billy Bob loves Charlene", as well as an outline of a heart, on the tower, as a means of professing his affection towards Charlene. The second verse describes the two of them raising a family on an 80-acre farm they purchased (with a front yard from which Billy Bob's water tower decorations are viewable), while the bridge reveals that the heart and words continue to remain intact on the tower, despite the town's attempts to paint over them.

== Release ==
For the single release, Epic Records had Diffie re-record "John Deere Green" for commercial and airplay release. The re-recorded version included a slightly altered rearrangement, more commercial-pop sound, as well as re-recorded vocals. To date, the "edited" version has only been released via cassette tape and 7" single.

== Critical reception ==
In 2024, Rolling Stone ranked the song at number 152 on its 200 Greatest Country Songs of All Time ranking.

== Other versions ==
The most notable later version of the song is by the Norwegian band Hellbillies. Their version, "Bondeblå" (a light blue color named after the farmers' blue overalls) from the album Drag (1996) tells about a boy on his first time service in the Norwegian military who insists on wearing a blue knitted sweater and matching hat that his mother knitted for him over his uniform, and how the other soldiers mistreat him, making him do their chores and bugging him consistently. However, in time he turns out fine and ends up as a highly ranked officer in the Norwegian army.

American Aquarium covered the song on their 2021 album Slappers, Bangers, and Certified Twangers: Vol 1.

In November 2023, Morgan Wallen and Hardy covered the song with Post Malone at the Country Music Association awards ceremony. Following this performance, a studio recording featuring Morgan Wallen and Hardy alongside a vocal track recorded by Diffie in 2006 debuted on the country music charts. This rendition is the lead single to Hardy's mixtape Hixtape Vol. 3, which includes covers of Joe Diffie songs.

== Formats and track listings ==
These are the formats and track listings of major single releases of "John Deere Green":

- US vinyl, 7", single, 45 RPM, cassette
1. "John Deere Green" (edit) – 3:36
2. "Somewhere Under the Rainbow" – 4:16

== Chart positions ==
Chart (1993–1994)	Peak position
Canada Country Singles (RPM)	6
US Billboard Hot 100	69
US Hot Country Songs (Billboard)	5

=== Year-end charts ===
Chart (1994)	Position
Canada Country Tracks (RPM)	75
US Country Songs (Billboard)	47
