= Joe Diffie =

American country singer (1958–2020)

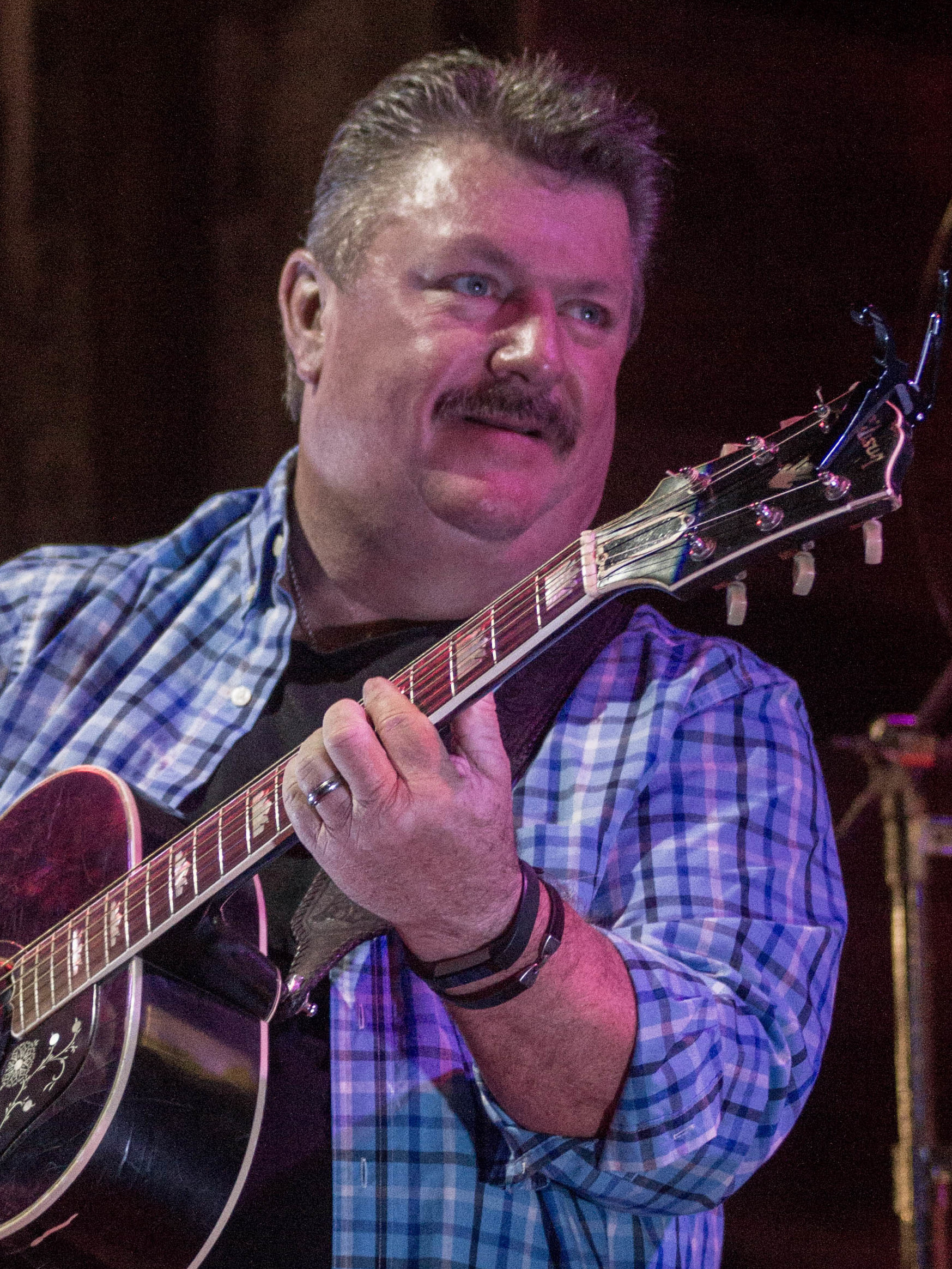
- Diffie performing in 2017

Background information
- Born: Joe Logan Diffie; December 28, 1958; Velma, Oklahoma, U.S.
- Died: March 29, 2020 (aged 61) Nashville, Tennessee, U.S.
- Cause of death: Complications from COVID-19
- Genres: Country; neotraditional country
- Occupations: Singer, songwriter
- Instruments: Vocals; guitar
- Works: Joe Diffie discography
- Years active: 1989–2020
- Labels: Epic Nashville; Monument Nashville; Broken Bow; Rounder
- Website: www.joediffie.com

Joe Logan Diffie (December 28, 1958 – March 29, 2020) was an American country music singer and songwriter. After working as a demonstration singer in the mid 1980s, he signed with Epic Records' Nashville division in 1990. Between then and 2004, Diffie charted 35 singles on the Billboard Hot Country Songs chart, five of which peaked at number one - his debut release "Home", "If the Devil Danced (In Empty Pockets)", "Third Rock from the Sun", "Pickup Man" (his longest-lasting number-one song, at four weeks), and "Bigger Than the Beatles". In addition to these singles, he had 12 others reach the top 10 and 10 more reach the top 40 on the same chart. He also co-wrote singles for Holly Dunn, Tim McGraw, and Jo Dee Messina, and recorded with Mary Chapin Carpenter, George Jones, and Marty Stuart.

Diffie released seven studio albums, a Christmas album, and a greatest-hits package under the Epic label. He also released one studio album each through Monument Records, Broken Bow Records, and Rounder Records. Among his albums, 1993's Honky Tonk Attitude and 1994's Third Rock from the Sun are certified platinum by the Recording Industry Association of America, while 1992's Regular Joe and 1995's Life's So Funny are both certified gold. His album, Homecoming: The Bluegrass Album, was released in late 2010 through Rounder. His style is defined by a neotraditionalist country influence with a mix of novelty songs and ballads.

Diffie died from complications related to COVID-19 during the pandemic on March 29, 2020, at the age of 61.

== Early life ==
Joe Diffie was born into a musical family in Velma, Oklahoma in 1958. His first musical performance came at age 7, when he performed in "The Muffin Man". Diffie's father, Joe R., played guitar and banjo, and his mother sang. Following in his father's footsteps, Diffie began to sing at an early age, often listening to the albums in his father's record collection. Diffie has said that his "Mom and Dad claimed that [he] could sing harmony when [he] was three years old." His family moved to San Antonio, Texas, while he was in the first grade, and subsequently to Washington, where he attended fourth and fifth grades. Later, he moved to Whitehall, Wisconsin, for the years he was in sixth grade and through his sophomore year of high school at Whitehall School District, and eventually moved back to Oklahoma, where he attended high school in Velma. In his last two years in high school, Diffie played football, baseball, and golf and ran track; in his senior year, he was recognized as Best All-Around Male Athlete.

After graduating, he attended Cameron University in Lawton, Oklahoma. Although he initially earned credits toward medical school, he decided against a medical profession after marrying for the first time in 1977 and ultimately dropped out before graduation. Diffie first worked in oil fields, then drove a truck that pumped concrete in the oilfield in Alice, Texas, before he moved back to Duncan to work in a foundry. During this period, he worked as a musician on the side, first in a gospel group called Higher Purpose, and then in a bluegrass band called Special Edition. Diffie then built a recording studio, began touring with Special Edition in adjacent states, and sent demonstration recordings to publishers in Nashville. Hank Thompson recorded Diffie's "Love on the Rocks", and Randy Travis put one of Diffie's songs on hold, but ultimately did not record it.

After the foundry closed in 1986, Diffie declared bankruptcy and sold the studio out of financial necessity. He also divorced his wife, who left with their two children. Diffie spent several months in a state of depression before deciding to move to Nashville, Tennessee. There, he took a job at Gibson Guitar Corporation. While at Gibson, he contacted a songwriter and recorded more demos, including songs that were later recorded by Ricky Van Shelton, Billy Dean, Alabama, and the Forester Sisters. By mid-1989, he quit working at the company to record demos full-time. Diffie also met Debbie, who later became his second wife. That same year, Diffie was contacted by Bob Montgomery, a songwriter and record producer known for working with Buddy Holly. Montgomery, who was then the vice president of A&R at Epic Records, said that he wanted to sign Diffie to a contract with the label, but had to put the singer on hold for a year. In the meantime, Holly Dunn released "There Goes My Heart Again", which Diffie co-wrote and sang the backing vocals. Following this song's chart success, Diffie signed with Epic in early 1990.

== Professional music career ==
=== 1990–1991: A Thousand Winding Roads ===
The label released Diffie's debut album, A Thousand Winding Roads, at the end of 1990, with Montgomery and Johnny Slate as producers. Its first single, "Home", reached the top of the Billboard Hot Country Songs chart. The song also reached number one on the country music charts published by Radio & Records and Gavin Report, making him the first country music artist to have a number-one debut single on all three charts, as well as the first country music artist to have a debut single spend more than one week in the number-one position at the latter two publications. Diffie co-wrote the album's second and fourth releases, "If You Want Me To" and "New Way (To Light Up an Old Flame)"; both peaked at number two on Billboard, and the former reached number one on the RPM country music charts in Canada. Between these two songs, "If the Devil Danced (In Empty Pockets)" became Diffie's second Billboard number one. The album itself peaked at number 23 on Top Country Albums. Diffie also performed his first concerts in late 1990, touring with George Strait and Steve Wariner. That same year, Cash Box named him Male Vocalist of the year. In 1991, Diffie co-wrote the tracks "Livin' on What's Left of Your Love" and "Memory Lane" on labelmate Keith Palmer's debut album.

=== 1992: Regular Joe ===
Diffie's second album, titled Regular Joe, was released in 1992 and was certified gold by the Recording Industry Association of America. The first two singles from the album both peaked at number five on Billboard: "Is It Cold in Here" and "Ships That Don't Come In", with the latter reaching number one on Radio & Records. "Ships That Don't Come In" was co-written by Dave Gibson, also recording on Epic at the time as a member of the Gibson/Miller Band. The album's third single, "Next Thing Smokin'", made its chart debut one month before "Not Too Much to Ask", a duet that Diffie recorded with Mary Chapin Carpenter for her album Come On Come On. Both of these songs made the country top 20, respectively reaching 16 and 15, and the duet was nominated for a Grammy Award for Best Country Collaboration with Vocals at the 35th Grammy Awards in 1993. The final single from Regular Joe was "Startin' Over Blues" (originally the B-side to "Ships That Don't Come In"), which peaked at number 41. Also included on the album was the ballad "Goodnight Sweetheart", later a top-10 country hit in 1996 for David Kersh.

Brian Mansfield gave the album a positive review in Allmusic, saying that it "has all the clichés of country music, and all the good stuff, too." Richmond Times-Dispatch reviewer Norman Rowe referred to Diffie as a "pleasant surprise" and called "Is It Cold in Here" "the sort of tear-jerker George Jones has worked wonders with in the past". Alanna Nash of Entertainment Weekly thought that Diffie "[sang] in his natural voice", but thought that its material "punches all the predictable thematic buttons."

Also in 1992, Diffie was nominated by the Academy of Country Music for Top New Male Vocalist, along with Billy Dean and Mark Chesnutt, but lost to Billy.

=== 1993: Honky Tonk Attitude ===
Honky Tonk Attitude (1993) shipped a million copies in the United States and was certified platinum. The first three singles from the album all reached the top 10 on the country singles charts: the title track (which Diffie co-wrote) and the Dennis Linde composition "John Deere Green" both peaked at number five, with the number-three "Prop Me Up Beside the Jukebox (If I Die)" in between. "John Deere Green" also accounted for Diffie's first appearance on the Billboard Hot 100, where it peaked at number 69. "In My Own Backyard", the last release from Honky Tonk Attitude, reached number 19 on the country charts. Diffie told the Fort Worth Star-Telegram that the album was "a little rowdier than the first two." Nash rated the album more favorably than the ones before it, saying that Diffie "is maturing into a first-rate interpreter of working-class woes."

Also in 1993, Diffie was inducted into the Grand Ole Opry. Several other artists and he won that year's Country Music Association award for Vocal Event of the Year, for their guest vocals on George Jones's "I Don't Need Your Rockin' Chair". Tim McGraw also included two of Diffie's songs on his 1993 debut album: another version of "Memory Lane", which he released as a single, and "Tears in the Rain".

=== 1994–1996: Third Rock from the Sun, Mr. Christmas, and Life's So Funny ===
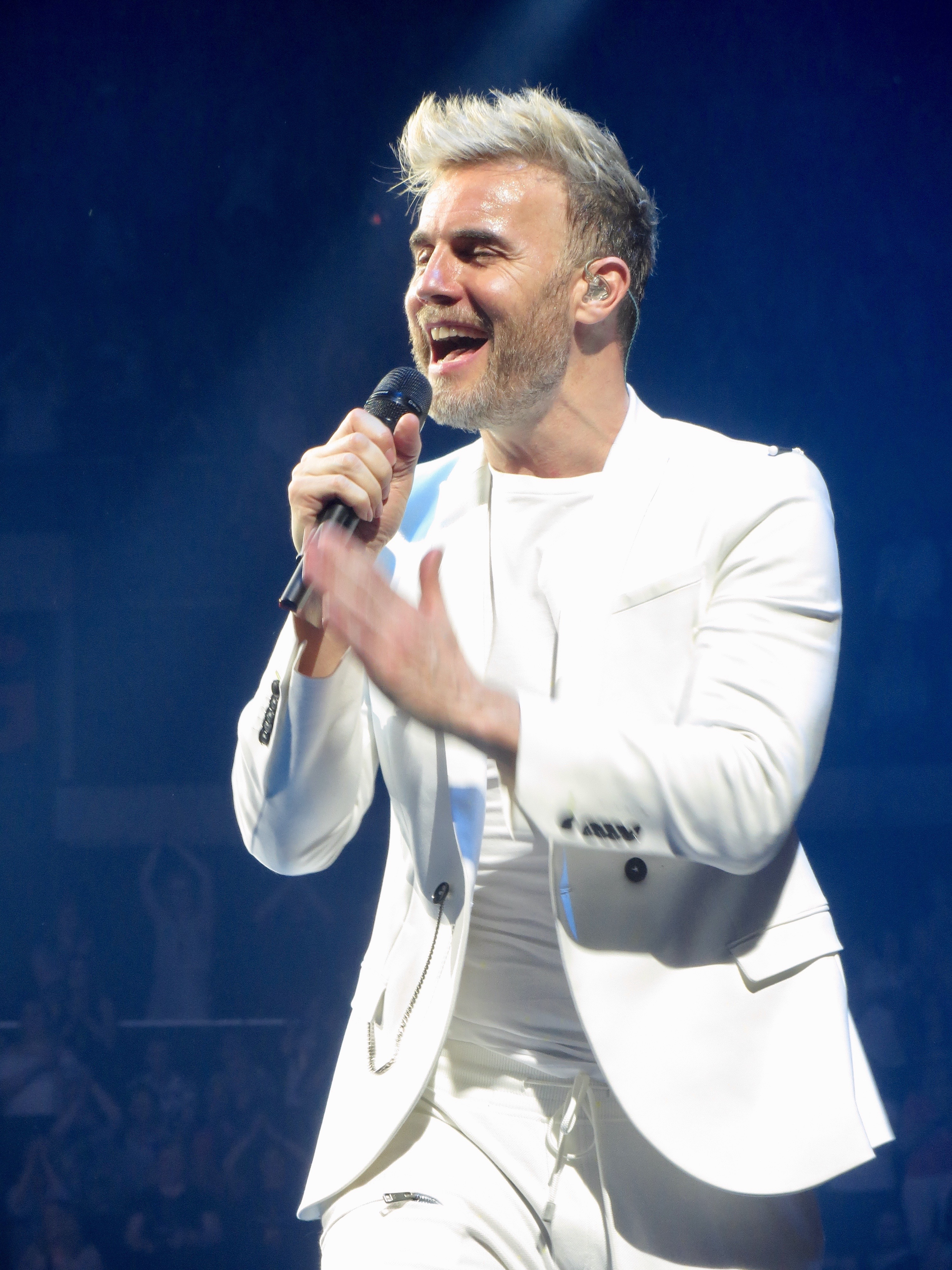
Joe Diffie's "So Help Me Girl" was later covered by Gary Barlow.

Third Rock from the Sun was Diffie's highest-charting top country album (where it reached number six), as well as his second consecutive platinum album. It was also the first album that he co-produced, doing so with Johnny Slate. The album included two consecutive number-one singles in its title track and in "Pickup Man". The latter of those two songs was Diffie's longest-lasting number one, at four weeks. Both songs also entered the hot 100, respectively peaking at 84 and 60. In 2005, "Pickup Man" was repurposed by the Applebee's restaurant chain for use in its television commercials. The album's next single, "So Help Me Girl", peaked at number two on the country charts and 84 on the pop charts, in addition to topping the RPM country charts. The song was covered in 1997 by English singer Gary Barlow. Diffie followed the song with "I'm in Love with a Capital 'U'" and "That Road Not Taken", which respectively reached country peaks of 21 and 40. Third Rock from the Sun received critical praise for adding more rock and up-tempo material. Thom Owens wrote that he began "adding more rock flourishes" on this album, and Nash said that Diffie "not only understands the blue-collar ethic from the inside out – he's also familiar with its humorous underbelly."

In mid-1995, he recorded the title track for Columbia Records's Runnin' Wide Open, an album comprising NASCAR-themed songs by various artists. He issued two albums later in the year. The first was a Christmas project titled Mr. Christmas, which comprised covers of traditional Christmas songs, as well as newly written songs. One of these original songs, "LeRoy the Redneck Reindeer", was issued as a Christmas single late in the year, peaking at number 33 upon its initial release and re-entering the country music charts for the next two years based on Christmas airplay. Of this album, Stephen Thomas Erlewine said, "it's pleasant, but it's not particularly distinguished."

His other release that year was the studio album Life's So Funny. It was led off by "Bigger Than the Beatles", the last number-one single of his career. The album's other two singles were "C-O-U-N-T-R-Y" and "Whole Lotta Gone" (previously the B-side of "Bigger Than the Beatles"), both of which peaked at 23 on the country music charts in 1996. Country Standard Time critic George Hauenstein praised the album for containing "songs that are slightly different from [what] those other artists sing." Owens thought that it was a "varied collection of ballads and midtempo rockers", but said that it was not "as consistently engaging" as Third Rock from the Sun. Nash gave "Bigger Than the Beatles" a C-minus rating, calling it "just a lame device to evoke the names of beloved rock heroes."

=== 1997–1998: Twice Upon a Time and Greatest Hits ===
Twice Upon a Time followed in 1997. Its singles all failed to make the top 10 on the country charts, with lead-off "This Is Your Brain" reaching number 25, followed by "Somethin' Like This" at number 40 and "The Promised Land" at number 61, the lowest-peaking single of his career. The album also failed to achieve a gold certification. Doug Virden and Drew Womack, who then recorded on Epic in the band Sons of the Desert, sang backing vocals on it. Also included on the album was "I Got a Feelin'", which Tracy Lawrence previously recorded on his 1994 album I See It Now. Jeffrey B. Remz criticized the two novelty songs on Twice Upon a Time for lacking substance, and thought that most of the ballads were well-sung, but that the production "lacks any soul." Owens said that it "doesn't offer anything new or especially remarkable from Joe Diffie."

In mid-1998, Epic Records released Diffie's Greatest Hits package, which featured three new cuts. Among these were "Texas Size Heartache", and its B-side, "Poor Me", which respectively reached numbers four and 43 on the country charts. At the end of the year, Diffie recorded a cover of Charlie Rich's "Behind Closed Doors" for the multiple-artist album A Tribute to Tradition on Columbia Records. Diffie's version of the song peaked at number 64 based on unsolicited airplay. He also contributed to another cut on that album, "Same Old Train", which featured Marty Stuart and 11 other country music singers. This song peaked at 59 on the country charts and won the 1999 Grammy Award for Best Country Collaboration with Vocals for all artists involved.

=== 1999–2000: A Night to Remember ===
His final album for Epic Records, titled A Night to Remember, was released in 1999. As he did with the new cuts for his Greatest Hits package, Diffie worked with producers Don Cook and Lonnie Wilson, a friend of Diffie's who worked primarily as a session drummer and songwriter, and formerly fronted the band Bandana. Its title track spent 29 weeks on the country charts and peaked at number six; it was his only top 40 on the hot 100, where it reached number 38. After this song came "The Quittin' Kind" and "It's Always Somethin' ", which respectively reached 21 and five on the country charts, and 90 and 57 on the hot 100. The latter spent 37 weeks on the country music charts, the longest chart run achieved by any of his singles.

Country Standard Time gave the album a positive review for having "nary a novelty tune in the bunch", and Nash wrote that it had a "surprising depth of feeling." Erlewine also noted that the album did not contain any novelty songs, and called it the "purest country album he's ever made."

=== 2001–2004: In Another World and Tougher Than Nails ===
In 2001, Sony Nashville transferred Diffie from its Epic division to the Monument Records division due to a corporate decision that Epic had too many artists and Monument had too few. Cook and Wilson also produced his only album for Monument, which was titled In Another World. Regarding this album, Diffie told Billboard that its material had a common theme of love, and that he wanted to create a more contemporary sound through the production. The album's title track peaked at number 10 on the country charts and number 66 on the hot 100. Only one other single was released from the album: "This Pretender" (co-written by Rascal Flatts lead singer Gary LeVox), which failed to make the country music Top 40.

In Another World received mixed reviews. Country Weekly reviewer wrote that Diffie "deals with adult emotions" and described the title track as "a shimmering ballad perfect for his expressive tenor." William Ruhlmann called the album "sturdy formula country", and Jeffrey B. Remz of Country Standard Time said that he "easily interpret[s]" the songs, but "doesn't seem to be doing anything too dramatically different." After Monument closed its Nashville branch, Diffie began touring with Mark Chesnutt and Tracy Lawrence on the Rockin' Roadhouse Tour, which began in 2002. That same year, Diffie was inducted into the Oklahoma Music Hall of Fame.

Diffie signed to the independent Broken Bow Records in 2003. His only album for the label was Tougher Than Nails, which Wilson and he produced with Buddy Cannon. It included five songs that Diffie co-wrote, as well as a duet with George Jones entitled "What Would Waylon Do". Tougher Than Nails produced a top-20 hit in its title track, followed by "If I Could Only Bring You Back", which peaked at number 50 and spent only eight weeks on the charts. This latter song was also his last charting single. Erlewine said of the album's content, "there's nothing new, but there doesn't need to be", and Country Standard Time said that the album "shows that he's still got the talent that took him to stardom in the first place."

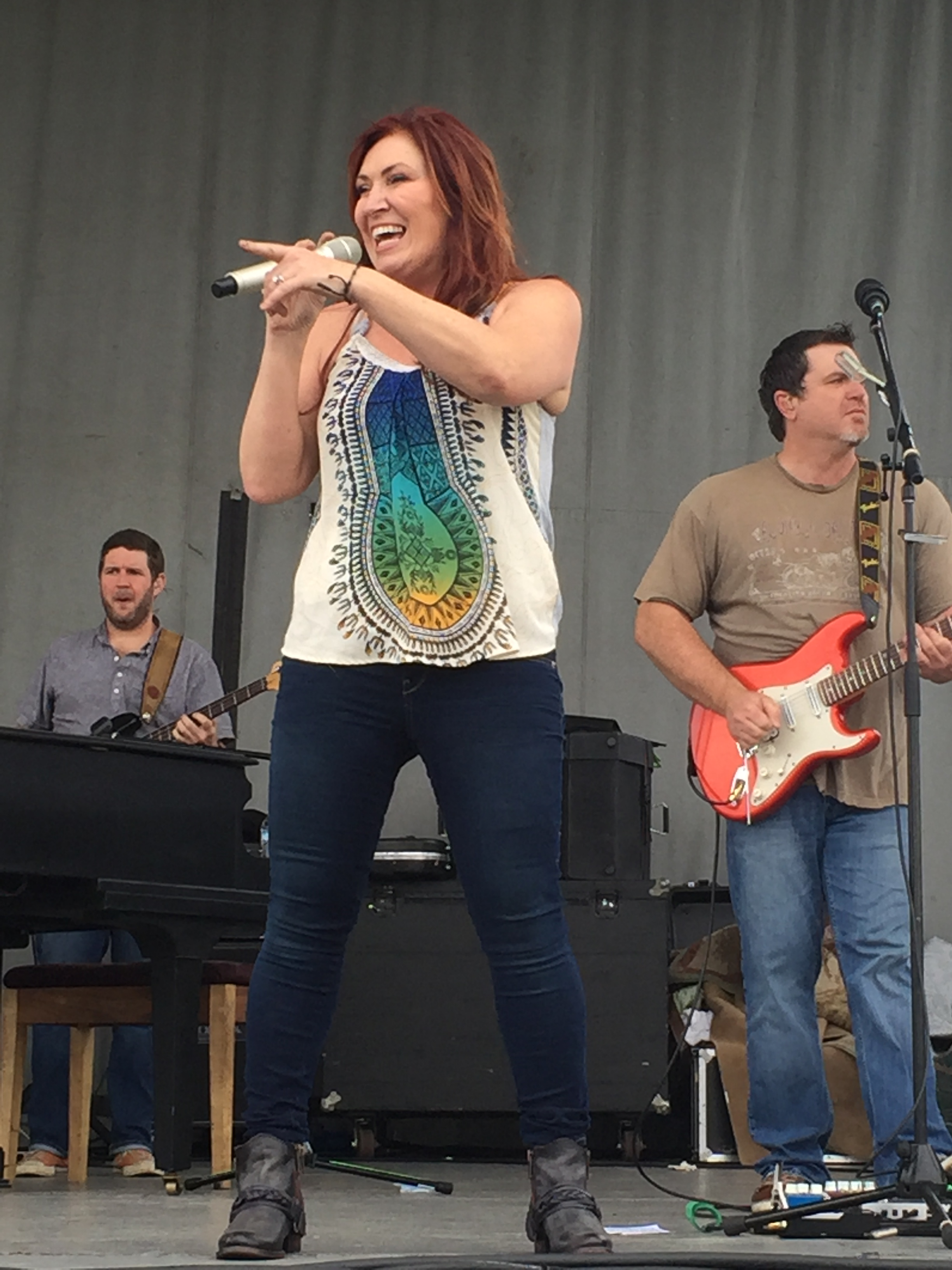
Jo Dee Messina had a hit single in 2005 with a cover of Diffie's "My Give a Damn's Busted".

In 2005, Jo Dee Messina released "My Give a Damn's Busted", which Diffie co-wrote and originally recorded on In Another World. Her version of the song, included on her album Delicious Surprise, was a number-one single that year.

=== 2004–2020: The Ultimate Collection and later activity ===
After leaving Broken Bow, Diffie continued to tour, primarily playing smaller venues and county fairs. In 2007, he joined with Lonestar, Charlie Daniels, and Craig Morgan to perform a benefit concert for Sgt. Kevin Downs, a soldier who was severely wounded in Iraq. In 2008, Diffie compiled and released a live album, and he signed to Rounder Records later in that year. Rounder released an album called The Ultimate Collection, which comprised re-recordings of his hits for Epic.

His next project for Rounder, Homecoming: The Bluegrass Album, was released on October 26, 2010. It includes collaborations with The Grascals, Rhonda Vincent, and other bluegrass artists. Diffie toured at various county fairs in August 2010 in support of it. He co-produced the album with Luke Wooten, and included on it the song "Tennessee Tea", which Diffie originally recorded while he was in Special Edition. Allmusic reviewer j. poet gave this album a positive review for showing Diffie's bluegrass influences.

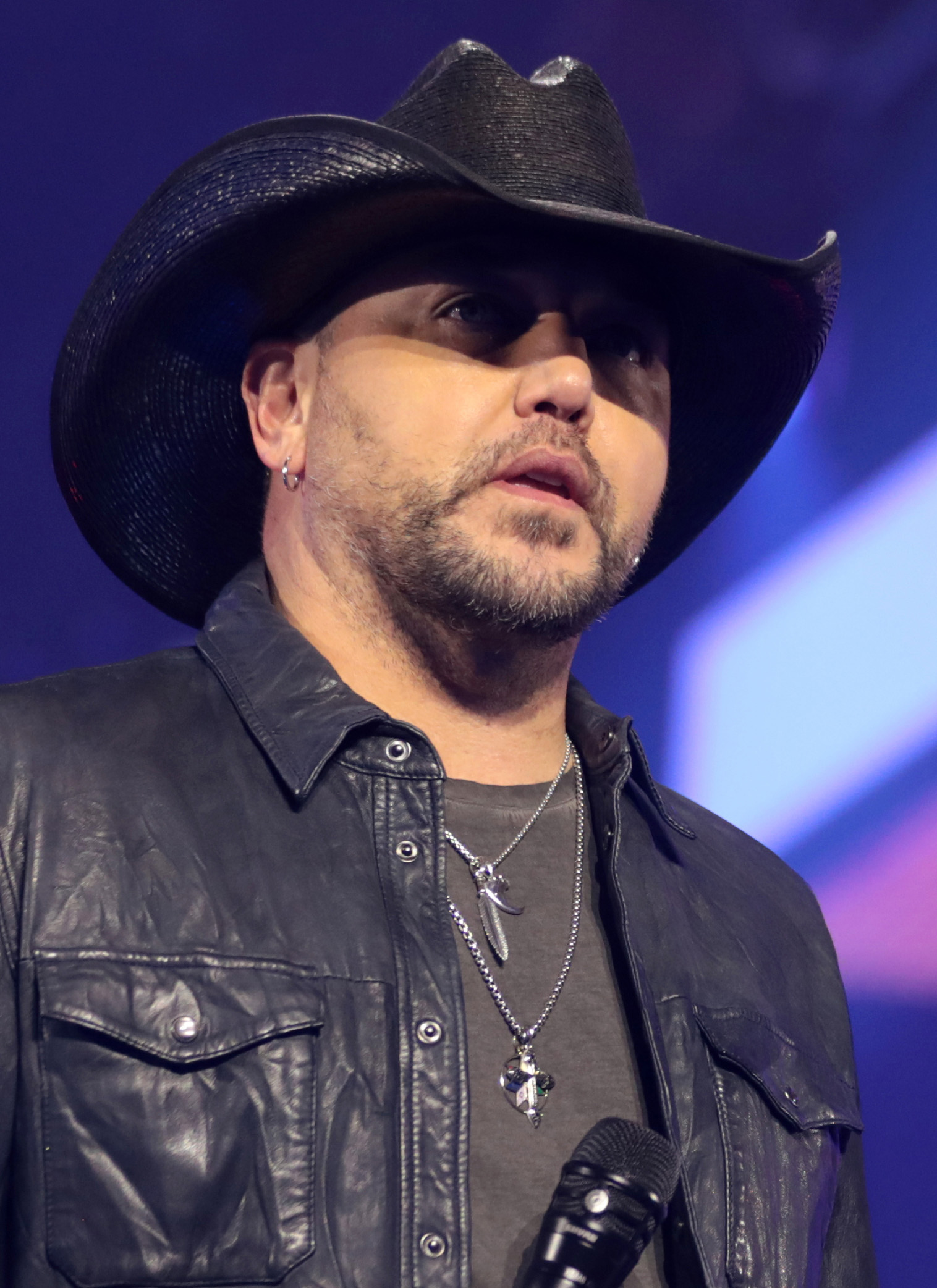
Jason Aldean recorded the song "1994", which makes several references to Diffie and his music.

In late 2012, Jason Aldean recorded the song "1994", co-written by Thomas Rhett, Luke Laird, and Barry Dean. The song, which was released in February 2013 as the third single from Aldean's album Night Train, name-drops Diffie and incorporates several of his song titles into the lyrics. Upon hearing about the song, Diffie said, "it's really an honor" to be mentioned in the song, and that it was "flattering". Later in the year, Diffie collaborated with Aaron Tippin and Sammy Kershaw on the album All in the Same Boat, and cut the single "Girl Riding Shotgun" with D Thrash of the Jawga Boyz. This was followed in 2019 by a vinyl album called Joe, Joe, Joe Diffie.

In 2023, Hardy paid tribute to Diffie during the Academy of Country Music ceremony, where he joined Morgan Wallen and Post Malone in live renditions of "Pickup Man" and "John Deere Green". A studio recording of the "Pickup Man" cover, featuring Hardy, Post Malone, and a vocal track recorded by Diffie in 2006, was released soon afterward as the first single from Hardy's album Hixtape: Vol. 3: Difftape, which was released in March 2024. This project includes Hardy and other artists covering Diffie's songs.

== Musical styles ==
Steve Huey of Allmusic wrote that Diffie "lent his traditional sensibilities to humorous, rock-tinged novelties and plaintive ballads." His early albums for Epic mostly consisted of ballads, but starting with Honky Tonk Attitude, he began to include more up-tempo and novelty numbers. Starting with A Night to Remember, Diffie returned to a more ballad-oriented sound; Mike Kraski, then the senior vice president of sales for Sony Music Nashville, thought that the albums before it had over-emphasized his novelty releases. Diffie's influence on music was recognized with his name being mentioned in the 2019 hit song Raised on Country by artist Chris Young.

Alanna Nash regularly compared Diffie's voice to that of George Jones. In her review of A Thousand Winding Roads, she contrasted the album with Mark Chesnutt's debut Too Cold at Home by saying, "While Chesnutt merely takes his inspiration from Jones, Diffie mimics Jones' delivery ... But now that he's making records himself, [his vocal imitation] drops him to the rear of the pack, as a stylist with little style of his own." She thought that Diffie began to move away from his George Jones influences on A Night to Remember. William Ruhlmann wrote that Diffie "has put together a decade-plus career in country largely on his ability to succeed" in "scour[ing] Nashville publishers for 10 good compositions in the established style", and that he was an "adequate but undistinguished singer."

== Personal life and death ==
Diffie was married four times. His first wife was Janise Parker, whom he married while in college. The couple had two children, Parker and Kara, then divorced in 1986. Parker Diffie later worked as Diffie's stage manager in the mid-2000s, and in mid-2010, he and Kara auditioned for American Idol. Two years after divorcing Janise, Diffie married Debbie Jones, a nurse technician. They had two sons, Drew and Tyler, the latter of whom was born with Down syndrome and nearly died in 1991 following complications from a tonsillectomy.

In 2000, Diffie married Theresa (née Crump), whom he met at a concert, at the Opryland Hotel in Nashville. They have one daughter, Kylie, born in 2004. The couple divorced in 2017. Diffie married Tara Terpening at The Musicians Hall of Fame in Nashville in 2018.

From 1992 to the early 2000s, Diffie held a charity concert and golf tournament benefiting First Steps, a nonprofit organization for the education of mentally and physically impaired children. His contributions to this organization won him a Humanitarian Award from the Country Radio Broadcasters in 1997. Diffie later became a country music radio broadcaster himself, fronting a midday program for Tulsa radio station KXBL.

On March 27, 2020, Diffie announced that he tested positive for COVID-19. Two days later, on March 29, he died in Nashville at the age of 61 from complications related to the illness.

== Discography ==
=== Studio albums ===
- A Thousand Winding Roads (1990)
- Regular Joe (1992)
- Honky Tonk Attitude (1993)
- Third Rock from the Sun (1994)
- Mr. Christmas (1995)
- Life's So Funny (1995)
- Twice Upon a Time (1997)
- A Night to Remember (1999)
- In Another World (2001)
- Tougher Than Nails (2004)
- Homecoming: The Bluegrass Album (2010)
- All in the Same Boat (2013)

=== Billboard number-one hits ===
- "Home" (1 week, 1990)
- "If the Devil Danced (In Empty Pockets)" (1 week, 1991)
- "Third Rock From the Sun" (2 weeks, 1994)
- "Pickup Man" (4 weeks, 1994)
- "Bigger Than the Beatles" (2 weeks, 1995-1996)

== Awards and nominations ==
=== Grammy Awards ===
Year	Nominee / work	Award	Result
1993	"Not Too Much to Ask"^{[A]}	Best Country Collaboration with Vocals	Nominated
1999	"Same Old Train"^{[B]}	Best Country Collaboration with Vocals	Won

=== TNN/Music City News Country Awards ===
Year	Nominee / work	Award	Result
1992	Joe Diffie	Star of Tomorrow	Nominated
1993	Mary Chapin Carpenter and Joe Diffie	Vocal Collaboration of the Year	Nominated
1993	George Jones and Friends^{[C]}	Vocal Collaboration of the Year	Nominated

=== Academy of Country Music Awards ===
Year	Nominee / work	Award	Result
1992	Joe Diffie	Top New Male Vocalist	Nominated
1993	Mary Chapin Carpenter and Joe Diffie	Top Vocal Duo of the Year	Nominated
1995	"Third Rock From the Sun"	Single Record of the Year	Nominated
1995	Joe Diffie	Top Male Vocalist of the Year	Nominated
1999	"Same Old Train"^{[B]}	Top Vocal Event of the Year	Nominated

=== Country Music Association Awards ===
Year	Nominee / work	Award	Result
1992	Joe Diffie	Male Vocalist of the Year	Nominated
1993	"I Don't Need Your Rockin' Chair"^{[D]}	Vocal Event of the Year	Won
1999	"Same Old Train"^{[B]}	Vocal Event of the Year	Nominated

^[A]Nominated alongside Mary Chapin Carpenter
^[B]Nominated alongside Clint Black, Merle Haggard, Emmylou Harris, Alison Krauss, Patty Loveless, Earl Scruggs, Ricky Skaggs, Marty Stuart, Pam Tillis, Randy Travis, Travis Tritt and Dwight Yoakam
^[C] George Jones' "Friends" also includes: Vince Gill, Garth Brooks, Travis Tritt, Mark Chesnutt, Alan Jackson, Pam Tillis, T. Graham Brown, Patty Loveless and Clint Black
^[D]Nominated alongside George Jones and Friends
