= Tony Martin (songwriter) =

American songwriter

Tony Martin is a country music songwriter who has had fifteen number-one hits as a songwriter. Among his compositions are "Third Rock from the Sun" by Joe Diffie, "Just to See You Smile" by Tim McGraw, "You Look Good in My Shirt" by Keith Urban, and "No Place That Far" by Sara Evans, each of which topped the U.S. Hot Country Chart.

Martin received a bachelor's degree from Brigham Young University (BYU) in 1986. His degree emphasized journalism, and he was a reporter for "The Daily Journal" in Chicago after he graduated from BYU. His song "Baby's Gotten Good at Goodbye" was recorded by George Strait in 1988. Its success made Martin decide to go to Nashville. When he first moved there, he worked as a correspondent for The Tennessean to help support himself and his wife Amethea.

In 2001, Martin signed an exclusive contract with Sony/ATV Music Publishing.

He is the son of another Nashville-connected songwriter Glenn Martin.

Martin is a member of The Church of Jesus Christ of Latter-day Saints. Among other callings in the LDS Church, he has served in the bishopric of a single members branch and as a seminary teacher.

== Sources ==
- "Encyclopedia of Musical Alumni" in BYU Magazine, Fall 2007
- Meridian Magazine article on Mormons in the Nashville Music scene
- Article on Martin's deal with Sony/ATV
- "Music City: LDS top charts in Nashville", Church News, June 10, 2000
