= Home (Joe Diffie song) =

Single by Joe Diffie

from the album A Thousand Winding Roads
- B-side: "Liquid Heartache"
- Released: August 21, 1990
- Recorded: December 8, 1989 - May 1990
- Studio: The Bennett House, Franklin, TN
- Genre: Country
- Length: 3:20
- Label: Epic
- Songwriters: Fred Lehner, Andy Spooner
- Producers: Johnny Slate, Bob Montgomery

Joe Diffie singles chronology
"Home" (1990)	"If You Want Me To" (1990)

"Home" is a song written by Fred Lehner and Andy Spooner, and recorded by American country music singer Joe Diffie as his debut single. It was released in August 1990 as the lead-off single from his debut album A Thousand Winding Roads. "Home" rose to the top of all three major country format charts that were in existence at the time — Billboard, Radio & Records (now known as Mediabase 24/7), and the now-defunct Gavin Report — marking the first time in chart history that a country singer's debut single had done so. It also peaked at number 1 on the Canadian RPM Country Tracks chart.

== Content ==
Diffie said the song stirred strong emotions: "I think everybody related to it, regardless of whether they were raised in the country or city, because everybody has a home in their memory."

== Music video ==
A music video did not accompany the song, which was highly unusual for a hit record in the 1990s. Diffie told the Chicago Tribune that the decision happened by design. "We told people in radio that we wanted them to have the first shot at the music and I think they were appreciative of that."

== Chart positions ==
Chart (1990)	Peak position
Canada Country Singles (RPM)	1
US Hot Country Songs (Billboard)	1

=== Year-end charts ===
Chart (1990)	Position
Canada Country Tracks (RPM)	13
