= Dennis Linde =

American songwriter (1943–2006)

- Linde, circa 2000

Background information
- Born: March 18, 1943; Abilene, Texas, U.S.
- Died: December 22, 2006 (aged 63) Nashville, Tennessee, U.S.
- Genres: Country; rock
- Occupation: Singer-songwriter
- Instruments: Vocals; acoustic guitar; bass guitar; drums
- Years active: c. 1970–2006
- Labels: Asylum; Elektra; Monument

Dennis Linde (LIN-dee, March 18, 1943 – December 22, 2006) was an American musician and songwriter based in Nashville who has had over 250 of his songs recorded. He is best known for writing the 1993 song "John Deere Green" by Joe Diffie, as well as the 1972 Elvis Presley song, "Burning Love", an international hit that has been featured in at least five motion pictures. In 1994, Linde won BMI's "Top Writer Award" and received four awards as BMI's most-performed titles for that year. He never liked publicity, and shunned awards shows to the extent of having family members collect his awards for him. He wrote both words and music for most of his songs, rarely collaborating with co-writers. He earned 14 BMI "Million-Air" songs (a song played on the air one million times). In 2001, he was inducted into the Nashville Songwriters Hall of Fame.

Linde wrote the following top-5 U.S. country hits: "Long Long Texas Road" (Roy Drusky, 1970), "The Love She Found in Me" (Gary Morris, 1983), "Walkin' a Broken Heart" (Don Williams, 1985), "Then It's Love" (Don Williams, 1986), "I'm Gonna Get You" (Eddy Raven, 1988), "In a Letter to You" (Eddy Raven, 1989), "Bubba Shot the Jukebox" (Mark Chesnutt, 1992), "It Sure Is Monday" (Mark Chesnutt, 1993), "Callin' Baton Rouge" (Garth Brooks, 1993), and "John Deere Green" (Joe Diffie, 1993). He also wrote "Goodbye Earl", a gold single for The Chicks in 2000.

Linde died in 2006 at age 63 of idiopathic pulmonary fibrosis at Vanderbilt University Medical Center. Sixteen years after his death, Ashley McBryde released a concept album entitled Lindeville, a tribute to Linde's work. The album was nominated for Best Country Album of 2022 at the 65th Annual Grammy Awards.

== Early life ==
Linde was born in Abilene, Texas, but lived in St. Louis from age 13 to age 26 (1956 to 1969). His stepfather was a sales executive with Colgate-Palmolive company. The family moved from Abilene to San Angelo, then Miami and finally St. Louis. His family was not especially musical, but they all loved to sing. "I didn't even start in music until I was 15, but I had a feeling I could play guitar", Linde told The New York Times in 2005. His grandmother had given him a guitar at that age and he taught himself to play. He joined a St. Louis group called the "Starlighters" playing R&B and rock. He graduated from St. Louis' Normandy High School about 1960. He did not attend college and knew he was a prime candidate for the military draft. He enlisted in the Missouri Air National Guard.

Linde drove a Corvette and at age 24 he had so many speeding tickets that his driver's license was revoked. At this time he had a job driving a delivery truck for a dry cleaning company. Without his license he could not drive the truck, so he lost his job. At home with time on his hands, he played guitar, worked out arrangements, and began writing songs. Linde played in a band with St. Louis bandleader Bob Kuban (Note: In 1966, after Linde had left the band, "Bob Kuban & the In-Men" had a No. 12 hit on Billboard's Hot 100 with a song called "The Cheater". They were described by a reviewer as a "classic one-hit wonder top 40 group".) who saw promise in Linde's songwriting abilities, and suggested he explore songwriting in Nashville. Linde visited there several times and pitched his songs to Bob Beckham, the CEO of Combine Music Publishing. In those days, writers from out of town sometimes stayed at Beckham's home. On one of his several visits, Linde caught the eye of Beckham's daughter Pam, who happened to be home from college. A romance was struck and Linde made the move to Nashville in 1969 to work for Combine.

Linde and Pam were married in 1970. They subsequently had three children.

== Career ==
Linde found a perfect fit at Combine— it allowed him to flourish alongside writers and artists like Dolly Parton and Mickey Newbury. (Note: Newbury was not a Combine writer, but spent much of his time at the Combine office. He wrote for Acuff-Rose.) Linde said, "Bob Beckham's building at Combine was a rickety old two-story place, and Kris [Kristofferson] lived in an upstairs room next door. I just had never run into so many talented people". His first hit about feeling alienated from the cultural and political polarization of the late 60s was "Where Have All the Average People Gone" recorded by Roger Miller. The song peaked at #14 on the Country Charts in December 1969. After writing for Combine for about a year, his first major hit was "Long Texas Road" recorded by Roy Drusky. That same year, 1970, Roger Miller recorded Linde's "Tom Green County Fair".

== Burning Love ==
The following year (1971), he wrote "Burning Love" which became a worldwide hit when it was recorded by Elvis Presley. The song was written, Linde said, "on a lark". He had just bought a set of drums and was putting a drum track on tape at his home studio, sort of learning to play them, and the words and melody came to him. He then overdubbed the other instruments and vocals on his four-track machine (he played and sang all parts) and created a demo of the song. He completed it in 20 minutes. He credits the inspiration in part to the fact that he was a newlywed at the time and said " 'Burning Love' was a great newlywed title". The first singer to record it was Arthur Alexander on the Warner Brothers label in late 1971. Alexander was a fellow songwriter at Combine at the time; his album contained three other Linde compositions. Soon after Alexander's, Elvis Presley released a version which eclipsed it quickly— Presley's making the top ten on both sides of the Atlantic and scarcely missed becoming No. 1 in the U.S. in October 1972. It was Presley's last major hit. The song's worldwide success greatly increased Combine's profitability as well as Linde's stature as a songwriter. Elvis recorded two more of Linde's compositions, "I Got a Feelin' in My Body" and "For the Heart".

In the 1970s, Linde continued his desire to be a recording artist as well as a writer, doing non-country albums of things that he liked, sometimes experimental. He recorded the album Linde Manor on the Intrepid Label, a short-lived subsidiary of Mercury, but it was not a commercial success. The increased stature he found with "Burning Love" gave him sufficient credibility for a new deal with Elektra to record Dennis Linde in 1973. He then recorded Trapped in the Suburbs on Asylum Records in 1974. His most critically acclaimed album was Under the Eye for Monument in 1977. He was co-leader of the rock band Jubal, consisting of Alan Rush, Rob Galbraith, Terry Dearmore, and Randy Cullers. Their single album in 1972 on Elektra was not successful.

== "Goodbye Earl" ==
In 2000, his song for the Dixie Chicks, "Goodbye Earl", stirred some controversy for its take on spousal abuse. The song is about fictional characters Mary Ann and Wanda, longtime friends who kill Wanda's abusive husband. The main issue presented among critics was that the two women were more than pleased with committing the murder, unlike any previous songs of that type. Many radio stations refused to play the song when first released, and others played it with a message directing women in such a situation to a hotline number. Linde wrote other songs featuring an undesirable character named Earl; e.g., "Queen of my Double-Wide Trailer" (Sammy Kershaw). Linde kept a self-created map depicting a fictional town where the characters in his songs lived. It includes the referential water tower from "John Deere Green", as well as the location that led "Earl" to his demise.

In 1994, Linde won BMI's "Top Writer Award" and received four awards as BMI's most-performed titles for that year: "It Sure Is Monday" (Mark Chesnutt), "Janie Baker's Love Slave" (Shenandoah), "John Deere Green" (Joe Diffie), and "Queen of My Double Wide Trailer" (Sammy Kershaw). Although Linde was the sole composer of most of his songs, he occasionally collaborated with country artist Mel McDaniel and Nashville songwriters Bob DiPiero and Alan Rush. As a music producer, Linde was responsible for Mickey Newbury's American Trilogy and Kristofferson's Jesus was a Capricorn. He also wrote two songs for the soundtrack of the 1982 film, Grease 2 ; these were "Cool Rider" and "Reproduction". "Burning Love" has been on the soundtrack of several motion pictures, including Heartbreak Hotel (sung by Dennis Linde, 1988), Late for Dinner (by Elvis, 1991), Honeymoon in Vegas (by Travis Tritt, 1992), Love, Honor & Obey (by Kathy Burke & Ray Burdis, 2001), Lilo and stitch (by Wynonna, 2003), and The Game Plan (Elvis, 2007).

== Lindeville ==
In 2022, Ashley McBryde released Lindeville, an album named after Linde, and inspired by his songwriting. An NPR review by Jewly Hight noted that it was an unusual album featuring songs that were all connected in some way to Linde's quirky characters that all lived in the same fictional town. McBryde said, "I kind of dove in [to Linde's catalog] and just realized how cool it was that all these songs were connected." Lindeville was nominated for Best Country Album in 2023 at the 65th Annual Grammy Awards, Music critic Robert Christgau ranked it as the sixth best album of 2023. It was nominated for the 2023 Album of the Year by the Country Music Association.

== Personal life ==
Linde was known as one of the more reclusive figures on the Nashville scene, rarely attending industry events and preferring to be neither photographed nor interviewed. Chicago Tribune music writer Jack Hurst said, "[Linde] is no morose, unkempt hermit inhabiting some artistic garret". Rather, Linde was upbeat, jovial and nattily dressed, living in a custom-built suburban home. Nashville manager Scott Siman described Linde as a "mystery man," explaining, "If you ever saw Dennis Linde, it was amazing, because you didn't get that opportunity very often." Linde had bizarre challenges for himself; i.e., daring himself to write a song starting with every letter in the alphabet, leading to the creation of "X Marks The Spot" and "Zoot Suit Baby".

Linde's daughter, Mary Elizabeth (called "Lisa"), was an actress (Days of Our Lives, The Darkling) married to Hollywood actor James Marsden (X-Men, 27 Dresses). The couple sponsored a benefit for the Coalition for Pulmonary Fibrosis in 2009 to honor Dennis Linde, entitled "A Night of Burnin' Love" that included Rascal Flatts, Montgomery Gentry and Mark Chesnutt and others. Lisa Linde filed for divorce in 2011 after ten years of marriage.

Linde died of idiopathic pulmonary fibrosis at Vanderbilt University Medical Center in 2006 at the age of 63.

== Albums ==
- 1970 – Linde Manor
- 1971 – Surface Noise (unreleased)
- 1973 – Dennis Linde (Elektra)
- 1974 – Trapped in the Suburbs
- 1977 – Under the Eye (Monument)
