= Lonnie Wilson =

American drummer

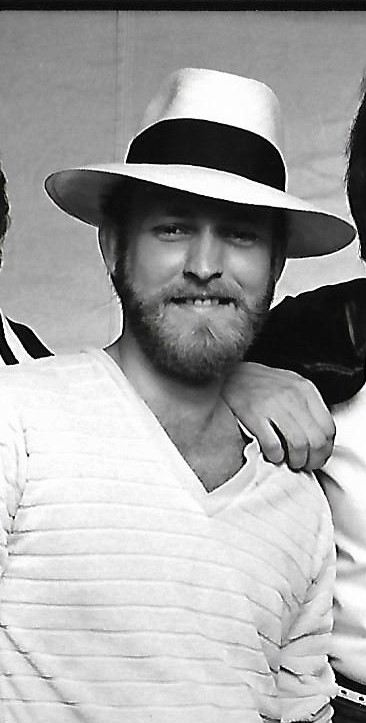
- Wilson in the 1980s

Background information
- Born: Monroe, Louisiana
- Genres: Country
- Occupations: Singer, drummer, record producer
- Instrument: Drums
- Years active: 1982–present
- Formerly of: Bandana

Lonnie Wilson is an American drummer, songwriter, and record producer, known primarily for his work in country music.

== Life and career ==
Born in Monroe, Louisiana, Wilson was originally the lead singer of the band Bandana, which charted ten singles on the Hot Country Songs charts between 1982 and 1986. Wilson quit the band in 1986 to spend time with his family and wife, Donna.

Wilson began playing as a session drummer in the early 1990s. One of the first albums to feature his drumming was Brooks & Dunn's debut Brand New Man. Other songs featuring Wilson on drums include "Indian Outlaw" by Tim McGraw, "I Swear" by John Michael Montgomery, "Time Marches On" by Tracy Lawrence, and "This Kiss" by Faith Hill. He was named Drummer of the Year by the Academy of Country Music in 2002 and 2004.

In the late 1990s, Wilson co-produced for Joe Diffie on new material for his 1998 Greatest Hits album and his 1999 studio album A Night to Remember. Wilson is also a songwriter, having written "There Goes My Heart Again" by Holly Dunn; "New Way (To Light Up an Old Flame)", "Startin' Over Blues", "Texas Size Heartache", and "This Pretender" by Diffie; "I'll Go Crazy" by Andy Griggs; "Honky Tonk Truth" by Brooks & Dunn; "Love You Out Loud" by Rascal Flatts; and "All My Friends Say" by Luke Bryan. Wide Open signed Wilson to a publishing contract in 2012.
