= List of animation studios owned by the Walt Disney Company =

Walt Disney Animation Studios logo since 2007

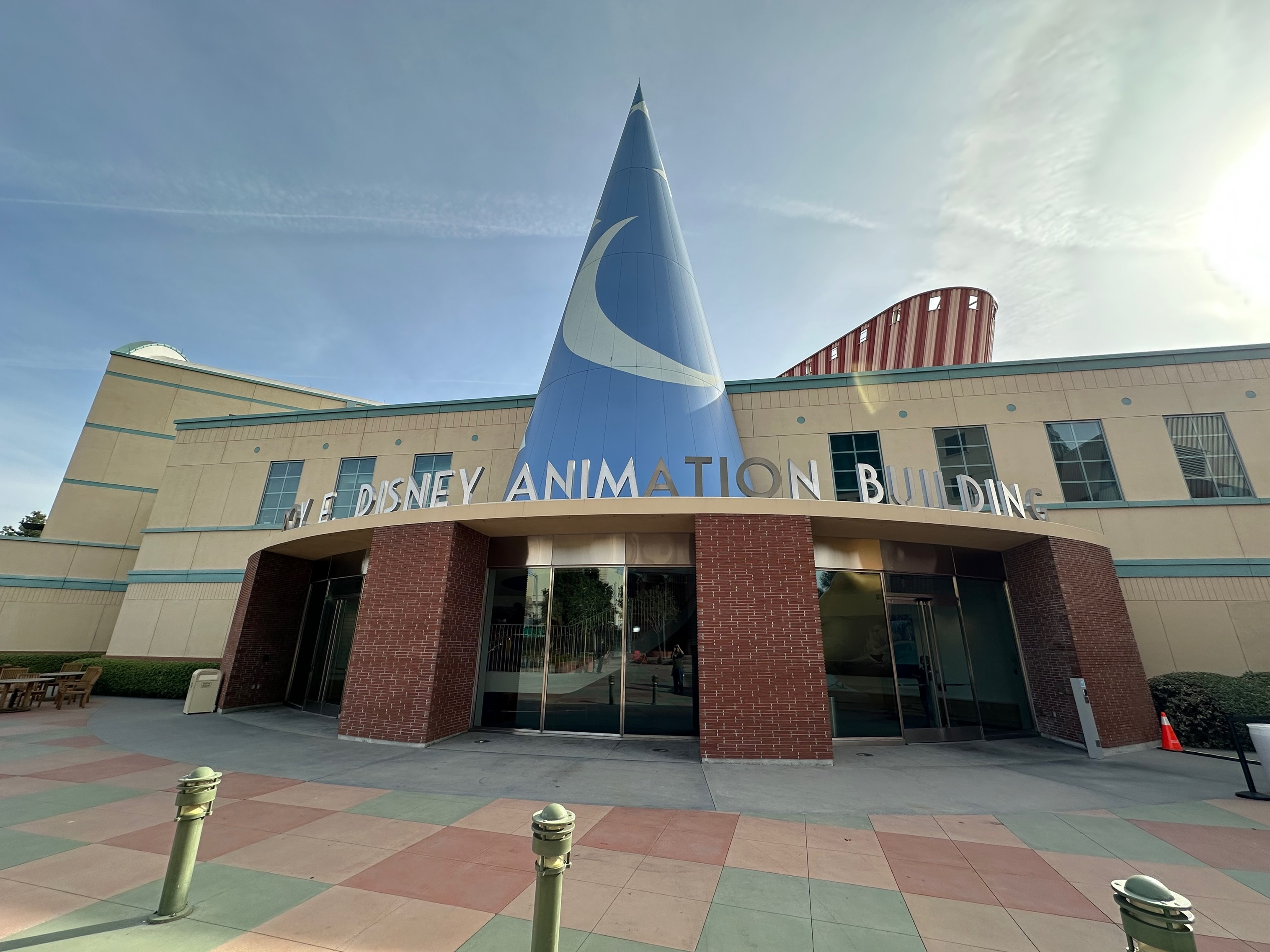
Walt Disney Animation Studios' current headquarters, the Roy E. Disney Animation Building, is located in Burbank, California across the street from the main Disney studio lot.

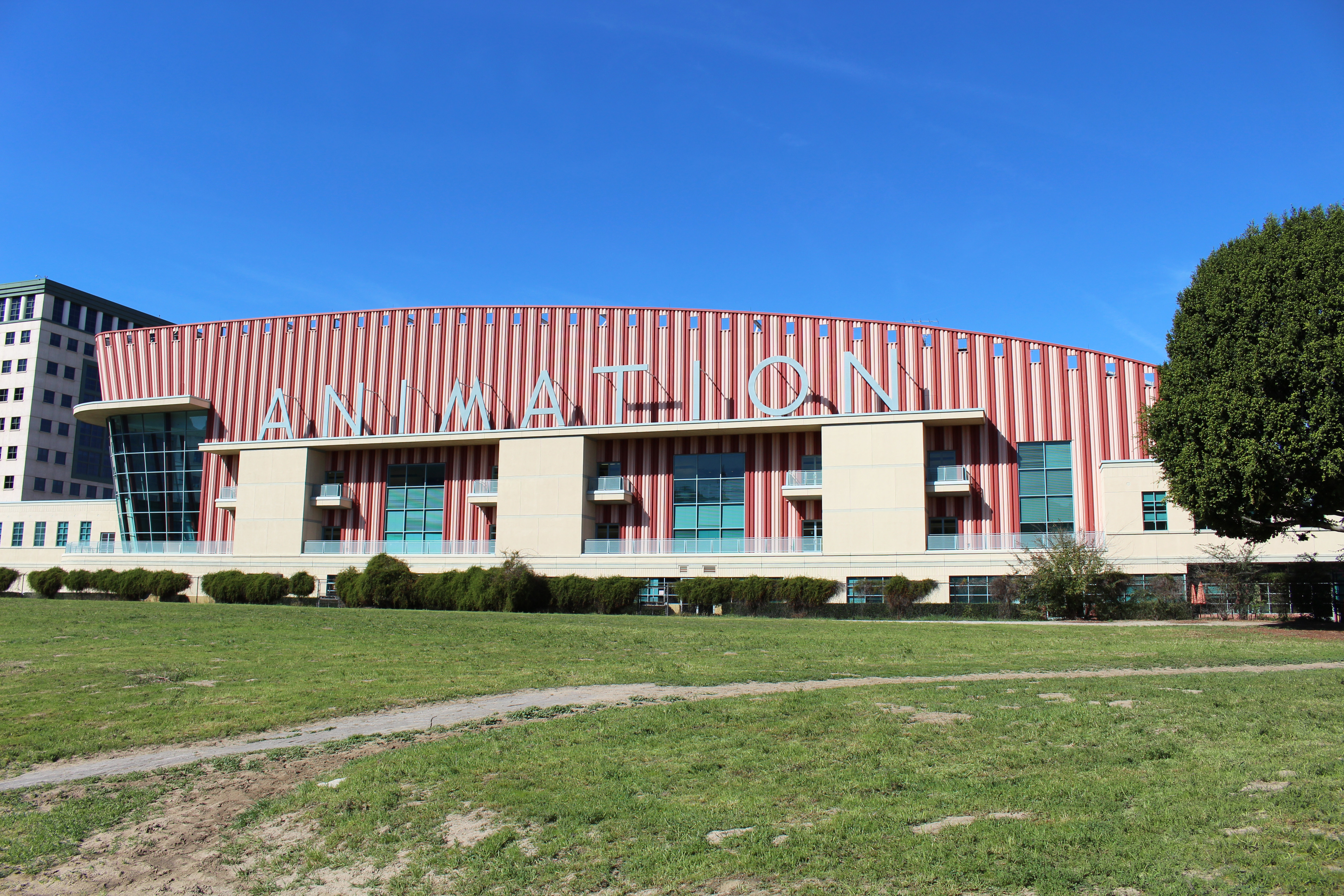
The south side of the Roy E. Disney Animation Building, as seen from the public park that separates it from the Ventura Freeway.

The Walt Disney Company has owned and operated several animation studios since the company's founding on October 16, 1923, by Walt and Roy Disney as the Disney Brothers Cartoon Studio; the current Walt Disney Animation Studios in Burbank, California is the company's flagship feature animation studio and claims heritage from this original studio. Adding to the growth of the company and its motion picture studio division the Walt Disney Studios, several other animation studios were added through acquisitions and through openings of satellite studios outside the United States. These expanded the company's animation output into television, direct-to-video, and digital releases, in addition to its primary feature animation releases.

Currently Walt Disney Animation Studios, Pixar, Lucasfilm Animation (through Lucasfilm) and 20th Century Studios's animation division are parts of the Walt Disney Studios unit. This article does not include other animation studios whose films were released by Walt Disney Studios Motion Pictures (the company's distribution unit) and not acquired by the company, nor does it count the Laugh-O-Gram Studio (1921–23), Disney's first animation studio, which predated the founding of the Walt Disney Company. For example, certain Studio Ghibli films were distributed by Disney internationally but never owned by the company. Also, Miramax, an independently operating unit of the Walt Disney Studios, also purchased US rights to foreign animated movies.

== Full list ==
=== Current animation studios ===
Studio	Established	Parent unit
Walt Disney Animation Studios	1923	The Walt Disney Studios
Animation: Theatrical feature films and short films in hand-drawn and CGI Former names: Disney Brothers Cartoon Studio (1923), (Note: Original name for the Walt Disney Company, founded in Burbank, Hollywood, by Walt Disney and Roy Disney.) Walt Disney Studios (1926), (Note: 2nd name for the Walt Disney Company) Walt Disney Productions (1929–1985), (Note: 3rd & original incorporation name for Walt Disney Studios partnership) Walt Disney Feature Animation (1986–2006) (Note: name for the main feature theatrical animation division); Former Units: The Secret Lab (1999–2001), Disney Circle 7 Animation (2004–2006) (Note: subdivision of the main feature animation studio, founded to produce sequels to individual Pixar films owned by Disney before acquiring Pixar outright in 2006. No films were ever released by this division.) Disneytoon Studios (2003–2006; 2008–2018); Former satellite studios: Walt Disney Feature Animation Florida (1989–2004) Disney Animation Australia (1988–2006) Disney Animation Canada (1996–2000) Disney Animation France/Paris (1989–2003) Disney Animation Japan/Walt Disney Television International Japan (1989–2004) Disney Animation U.K. (1986–1991)
Disney Television Animation	1984	Disney Branded Television (Disney General Entertainment Content)
Animation: Television series Originally a part of the Disney animation group, Disney TV Animation was transferred into Disney Television and later to the Disney Channels Former names: Walt Disney Pictures Television Animation Group (1984), Walt Disney Television Animation (1987–2011); Former satellite studios: Disney Animation Australia/DisneyToon Studios Australia (1988–2006) Disney Animation Canada (1996–2000) Disney Animation France/Disney Animation Paris (1989–2003) Disney Animation Japan/Walt Disney Television International Japan (1989–2004) Disney Animation U.K. (1986–1991) Disney MovieToons (1990–2003; theatrical name)/Disney Video Premieres (1994–2003; direct to video) Jetix Animation Concepts (2004–2009)
Pixar	1986	The Walt Disney Studios
Animation: Computer generated animated theatrical feature films and short films Acquired in 2006. Former satellite studios: Pixar Canada (2010–2013)
20th Century Animation	1994	20th Century Studios (The Walt Disney Studios)
Animation: animated theatrical feature films Acquired in 2019 in the 21st Century Fox acquisition. Former names: Fox Family Films, Fox Animation Studios, 20th Century Fox Animation; Former units: Fox Animation Studios (1994–2000), Blue Sky Studios (1987–2021)
20th Television Animation	1999	Disney Television Studios (Disney General Entertainment Content)
Animation: animated TV series Acquired in 2019 in the 21st Century Fox acquisition.

=== Divested or defunct animation studios ===
Studio	Established	status
DIC Entertainment	1971	sold in 2000
Animation: Television series and Feature films Founded in 1971 and was acquired with the purchase of Capital Cities/ABC in 1996. Founder with investment firms backing purchased the company in 2000.
SIP Animation	1977	closed in 2009
Founded in France by Haim Saban and Jacqueline Tordjman in 1977 as Saban International Paris. Acquired alongside parent company Saban Entertainment in 2001 as part of the Fox Family Worldwide buyout. Eventually Split from parent company, leaving Fox Family Worldwide holding 49%, to become an independent studio in the same year with Disney purchasing Fox Family Worldwide and renamed to its current name in 2002. Closed in 2009. Former names: Saban International Paris
BVS Entertainment	1984	Dormant
Formed in 1984 as Saban Entertainment by music and TV producers Haim Saban and Shuki Levy. Acquired as part of Fox Family Worldwide on October 24, 2001, and renamed to BVS Entertainment alongside other subsidiaries. One portion that worked on the English dub of Digimon was renamed to Sensation Animation and was closed when Disney lost the rights to dub the series. Currently dormant after Disney sold off the Power Rangers franchise and related shows back to Haim Saban and his company Saban Capital Group in 2010. Units: Saban International Paris (sold off in 2001), BVS International N.V. BVS International Services, Inc.
Blue Sky Studios	1987	closed in 2021
Animation: animated CGI theatrical feature films Acquired in 2019 in the 21st Century Fox acquisition. Closed in 2021 with its Intellectual Property absorbed into 20th Century Animation.
Jumbo Pictures, Inc.	1990	closed in 2000
Founded by Jim Jinkins and David Campbell and acquired by Disney in 1996.
Greengrass Productions	1992	closed in 1996
Live production unit of ABC that dabbled in TV and feature film animation.
The Baby Einstein Company	1997	discontinued animation
Founded in 1997 by stay-at-home mom and former teacher Julie Aigner-Clark, Acquired by Disney in 2000. Discontinued making videos in 2009. Now owned by Kids II, Inc.
Dream Quest Images	1996	merged in 1999
VFX & animated unit acquired in 1996 and merged into Secret Labs in 1999.
Disney Circle 7 Animation	2004	closed in 2006
Also known as: Circle 7 Animation a short-lived division of Walt Disney Feature Animation specializing in CGI animation and was originally going to work on making sequels to the Disney-owned Pixar properties.
ImageMovers Digital	2007	closed in 2011
Joint venture between Disney and ImageMovers, venture cancelled after two films.

=== Divested or defunct animation units ===
Studio	Established	status
Disney Animation U.K.	1986	Closed in 1991
Established in 1986; worked on Who Framed Roger Rabbit and a few other Disney projects.
Disney Animation Australia	1988	Closed in 2006
Also known as: DisneyToon Studios Australia Established in 1988; worked on several Walt Disney Television Animation and DisneyToon Studios projects.
Disney Animation Japan	1988	Closed in 2004
Also known as: Walt Disney Television International Japan Established in 1988; worked on several Walt Disney Television Animation and DisneyToon Studios projects.
Walt Disney Feature Animation Florida	1989	closed in 2004
Domestic division created to be an active attraction at Disney-MGM Studios and for additional output.
Disneytoon Studios	1990	closed in 2018
Animation: theatrical, direct to video, short and television films and Wrap-around animation Began as a sequel theatrical unit of Disney Television Animation and adding direct to video features before being transferred to Features Animation in 2003 and Disney Studios from 2006 to 2008 Former names: Disney MovieToons (1990–2003; theatrical name), Disney video premieres (1994–2003; direct to video); Former satellite studios: Disney Animation Australia/DisneyToon Studios Australia (1988–2006) Disney Animation Canada (1996–2000) Disney Animation France (1989–2007) Disney Animation Japan/Walt Disney Television International Japan (1989–2004) Disney Animation U.K. (1986–1991)
Disney Animation Canada	1996	Closed in 2000
Established in 1996, mostly working on several Disney Video Premiere projects.
Disney Animation France	1996	Closed in 2003
Former name: Brizzi Films, Disney Animation Paris Acquired in 1989 for use on certain Walt Disney Television Animation and Disney MovieToons projects, then shifted to Walt Disney Feature Animation projects in 1995.
The Secret Lab	1999	closed in 2001
Formed from the merger of Dream Quest Images and Disney Feature Animation's Computer Graphics division.
Pixar Canada	2010	Closed in 2013
This was a wholly owned subsidiary of Pixar Animation Studios. It was located in Vancouver, British Columbia. The studio was tasked to produce short films based on Pixar's feature film characters.

== Walt Disney Studios ==
=== Walt Disney Animation Studios ===
==== Disneytoon Studios ====
Disneytoon Studios, formerly Disney Movietoons, was an American animation studio owned by the Walt Disney Company, responsible for producing direct-to-video and occasional theatrical films for Disney Animation Studios, a part of the Walt Disney Studios.

==== Disney Circle 7 Animation ====
Circle 7 Animation, or Disney Circle 7 Animation, was a short-lived division of Walt Disney Feature Animation specializing in CGI animation and was originally going to work on making sequels to the Disney-owned Pixar properties, leading rivals and animators to derisively nickname the division "Pixaren't". The company released no movies during its tenure.

Steve Jobs, Pixar CEO, announced in January 2004 that Pixar would not renew their agreement with Disney and would seek out other distributors for releases starting in 2006. In 2004, Disney Circle 7 Animation was formed as a CG animation studio to create sequels to the Disney-owned Pixar properties. In late January 2006, new Disney CEO Bob Iger and Jobs agreed to have Disney purchase Pixar which led to Disney closing Circle 7.

==== The Secret Lab ====
The Secret Lab
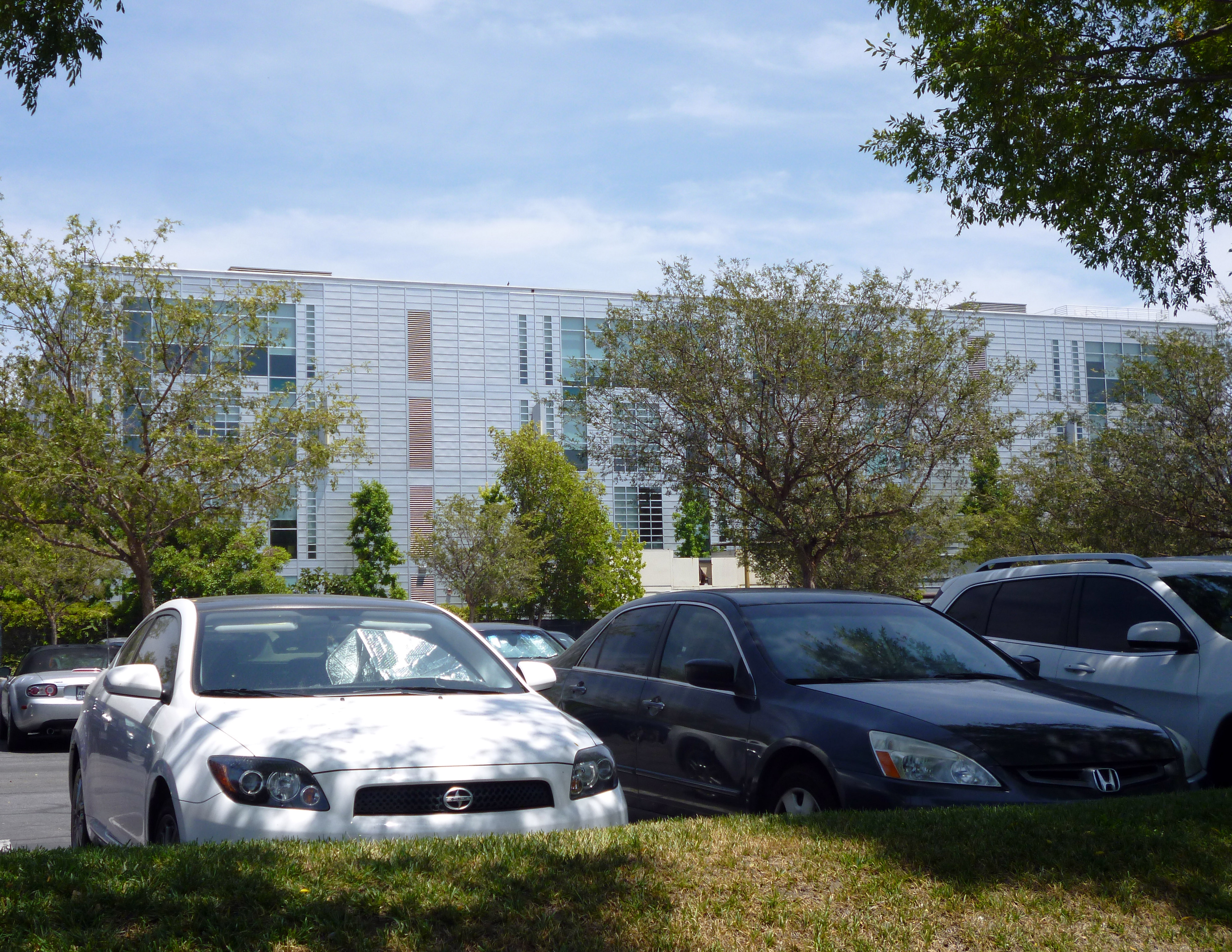
- The Secret Lab's former location in Burbank, California
- Formerly: Dream Quest Images (1979–1999)
- Type: Division
- Industry: Entertainment
- Founded: 1979; 47 years ago (as Dream Quest Images)
- Founders: Hoyt Yeatman; Scott Squires; Rocco Gioffre; Fred Iguchi; Tom Hollister; Bob Hollister
- Defunct: 2002; 24 years ago
- Fate: Closed
- Headquarters: Santa Monica, CA; Burbank, California, United States
- Key people: Andrew Millstein (GM, VP)
- Production output: VFX, Animation
- Owner: The Walt Disney Company (1996–2002)
- Number of employees: 350 (2002)
- Parent: Walt Disney Feature Animation (1996–2002)
- Divisions: DQ Films

The Secret Lab was an American special effects company that operated from 1979 to 2002, and was the result of a merger between Dream Quest Images and Walt Disney Feature Animation's Computer Graphics division.

Dream Quest was founded in a Santa Monica, California garage in 1979 by Hoyt Yeatman, Scott Squires, Rocco Gioffre, Fred Iguchi, Tom Hollister and Bob Hollister. Initially, they did piecemeal work on Escape from New York, E.T. the Extra-Terrestrial, and One From the Heart before moving to Culver City. DQ Films, the company's television commercial production division, remained in Santa Monica. In 1987, DQI model-making operations moved into a Simi Valley industrial park with most of the company following them later on. Their work on The Abyss and Total Recall each earned the company an Academy Award

The Walt Disney Company purchased the company in April 1996 and subsequently moved it to Burbank, California. DQI was purchased to replace Buena Vista Visual Effects. Soon after 1997, Andrew Millstein was appointed general manager of the company.

In October 1999, Dream Quest Images merged with Walt Disney Feature Animation's computer graphics division to form The Secret Lab, with Millstein continuing as general manager and vice president. The DQI and WDFA units were moved into a new location at Disney's Northside facility on Thornton Avenue just east of the Burbank-Glendale-Pasadena Airport, Lockheed Corp.'s former Skunk Works Building 90 until it was renovated for WDFA's headquarters in 1995. DQI's physical production facilities remained in Simi Valley.

The Secret Lab produced one CG animated motion picture, Dinosaur, in 2000. After Dinosaur, the Lab and WDFA began working on Wildlife, which was canceled that September.

The Lab being passed over for Disney work (and general industry decline) led to the unit being closed in 2002. The Secret Lab's last work with Disney was for the Touchstone Pictures/Spyglass Entertainment film Reign of Fire and the Castle Rock Entertainment/Warner Bros. comedy Kangaroo Jack. An artist at The Secret Lab purportedly confided to Harry Knowles of Ain't It Cool News that the studio was shut down by Disney when it proved to be too expensive.

VFXography

- Con Air
- The Rock
- Armageddon
- Mighty Joe Young
- Inspector Gadget
- Bicentennial Man
- Gone in 60 Seconds
- Mission to Mars
- 102 Dalmatians
- Shanghai Noon
- Tennessee
- Dinosaur
- Disney's The Kid
- Unbreakable
- Bubble Boy
- The Princess Diaries
- Golden Dreams
- Snow Dogs
- Big Trouble
- Reign of Fire
- Kangaroo Jack

=== Pixar ===
Pixar (/ˈpɪksɑːr/) is an American computer animation film studio based in Emeryville, California. The studio is best known for its CGI-animated feature films created with PhotoRealistic RenderMan, its own implementation of the industry-standard RenderMan image-rendering application programming interface used to generate high-quality images. Pixar began in 1979 as the Graphics Group, part of the computer division of Lucasfilm before its spin-out as a corporation in 1986 with funding by Apple Inc. co-founder Steve Jobs, who became its majority shareholder. Pixar and Disney had a seven feature agreement that allowed Disney to distribute the films with Disney owing the character rights. With the success of Toy Story 2 in 1999, then-Disney CEO Michael Eisner and Pixar CEO Steve Jobs began to disagree on how Pixar should be run and the terms of their continued relationship. Eisner claimed that Toy Story 2 would not count towards the "original" film count of the agreement. Jobs announced in January 2004 that Pixar would not renew their agreement with Disney and would seek out other distributors for releases starting in 2006. In 2004, Disney Circle 7 Animation was formed as a CG animation studio to create sequels to the Disney-owned Pixar properties. In late January 2006, new Disney CEO Bob Iger and Jobs agreed to have Disney purchase Pixar which led to Disney closing Circle 7.

=== Marvel Studios ===
==== Marvel Animation ====
With Disney's 2009 purchase of Marvel Entertainment, Disney acquired Marvel Animation, a component of Marvel Entertainment. which now has a studio in Glendale, California. The studio became a Marvel Studios subisdiary after Kevin Feige was named chief creative officer of Marvel Entertainment.

==== Marvel Studios Animation ====
In July 2021, Marvel Studios opened an in-house animation division named Marvel Studios Animation, though which they would develop mainly animated projects set within the Marvel Cinematic Universe, in addition to stand-alone projects. Brad Winderbaum as Head of Television, Streaming, and Animation, and Dana Vasquez-Eberhardt as VP of Animation.

=== Lucasfilm Animation ===
Lucasfilm Animation was added as an animation unit as part of the acquisition of Lucasfilm in 2012.

=== Distribution deals ===
In August 1996, Disney and Tokuma Shoten Publishing agreed that Disney would internationally distribute Tokuma's Studio Ghibli animated films. In 2002, Disney signed a four-picture deal with Vanguard Animation, although, only one film was released under that negotiation.

== Walt Disney Television ==
=== Disney Television Animation ===
Following the arrival of Michael Eisner,Walt Disney Pictures Television Animation Group was established on December 5, 1984. Following re-incorporation of The Walt Disney Company in 1986. The name of the TV animation unit was shortened to Walt Disney Television Animation. the following year in 1987. This name was used to 2011 when it was shortened to Disney Television Animation.

In January 2003, Disney initiated a reorganization of its theatrical and animation units to improve resource usage and continued focus on new characters and franchise development. TV Animation was transferred to Disney Channel Worldwide. Disney MovieToons/Disney Video Premieres unit was transferred from Disney Television Animation to Disney Feature Animation.

=== 20th Television Animation ===
Animation unit which was acquired as part of Acquisition of 21st Century Fox by Disney

=== DIC Entertainment L.P. ===
With Disney's acquisition of Capital Cities/ABC in 1995 came another animated unit, DIC Entertainment L.P., a Limited Partnership with CC/ABC and Andy Heyward. Eventually, DIC management arranged for the studio to become independent from Disney in 2001.

=== Greengrass Productions ===
Greengrass Productions is a unit of ABC at the time CC/ABC was acquired by Disney and produced some animation.

=== Jetix related ===
Disney purchased the Fox Family/Fox Kids Worldwide franchise on October 24, 2001, for the Fox Family Channel and also received ownership of several units and assets, including Saban Entertainment and Saban International. The Saban library also included the 75.7% majority stake in Fox Kids Europe N.V., the Latin American Fox Kids channel, Saban International Paris, Saban International Services, various original Fox Kids programming, and the acquired all-original and Marvel Comics-based DePatie-Freleng Enterprises/Marvel Productions and Marvel Films Animation/New World Animation libraries. Afterwards, Saban International Paris split from Saban and became independent, with the Walt Disney Company taking in a 49% minority stake of the company and a name change to SIP Animation on October 1, 2002. Jetix Animation Concepts was a joint-venture between Walt Disney Television Animation and Jetix Europe N.V. for shows that broadcast for the Jetix channels.

- Jetix Animation Concepts - joint-venture between Jetix Europe N.V. and Walt Disney Television Animation
- BVS Entertainment
  - BVS International, N.V.
  - BVS International Services, Inc.
- Sensation Animation – dubbing for the second half of Digimon Tamers and Digimon Frontier. Although, it was ceased and dissolved in 2003, Disney co-distributed the previously undubbed four Digimon movies in 2005 and the fifth TV season in 2007.
- SIP Animation - 49% minority stake owned by Disney
- Jetix Europe (formerly Fox Kids Europe N.V.) - 75.7% owned by Disney until 2008, full ownership afterwards. Currently dormant.

== Overseas studios ==
Three overseas animation studios (Australia, Japan and Canada) were set up to produce the company's animated television series. As direct-to-video increased in importance, the overseas studios moved to making feature films.

=== Walt Disney Animation Australia ===
Walt Disney Television Animation (Australia) Pty. Limited
- Trade name: Disney Animation Australia; DisneyToon Studios Australia
- Type: Subsidiary
- Industry: Entertainment
- Founded: 1988; 38 years ago
- Defunct: 2006; 20 years ago
- Fate: Closed
- Headquarters: Sydney, Australia
- Key people: Philip Oakes (general manager)
- Production output: Animation
- Number of employees: ~ 250 (2005)
- Parent: Walt Disney Television Animation 1988–2003; DisneyToon Studios; (Walt Disney Feature Animation) 2003–2006

Disney Animation Australia (DAA), also DisneyToon Studios Australia, was a Disney animation studio located in Sydney.

DAA was started in 1988 at the former Hanna-Barbera overseas studio in St Leonards, Sydney. Initially, Animation Australia worked on various television shows including Aladdin, Timon & Pumbaa, and Goof Troop. As staffing increased, the studio moved to Castlereagh Street.

Disney began producing direct-to-video sequels of its Feature Animation productions, the first of which was the Aladdin sequel The Return of Jafar. When Aladdin was selected as a possible candidate as an animated TV series (before the film's release), as with many animated series, the first three episodes were one multi-part story which Disney used as a potential 'family movie special' for the Friday night before the series' premiere. With work handed out to the Australia animation studio, the opening story was instead greenlit for a direct-to-video release. Thus with "Jafar" and its success, the direct-to-video unit, Disney Video Premieres, started. A second sequel, Aladdin and the King of Thieves, provided work to both the Sydney and Japanese animation units.

Australia was assigned additional film sequels: The Lion King II: Simba's Pride, An Extremely Goofy Movie and Lady and the Tramp II: Scamp's Adventure. The company's first feature film was Return to Never Land in 2002 grossing over $100 million worldwide at the box office. In 2005, the studio produced three animated movies: Tarzan II, Lilo & Stitch 2 and Bambi II. Disney Animation Australia was closed in mid-2006 after finishing Brother Bear 2, The Fox and the Hound 2, Cinderella III, and The Little Mermaid: Ariel's Beginning.

==== Projects ====
Title	Release type	Release date	Franchise	Other production company(ies)	
The Return of Jafar	Direct-to-video	20 May 1994	Aladdin	Disney Video Premieres; Disney Animation Japan	
A Goofy Movie	Theatrical	April 7, 1995	Goofy	Disney Animation France; Disney MovieToons; Phoenix Animation Studios	
Aladdin and the King of Thieves	Direct-to-video	13 August 1996	Aladdin	Disney Video Premieres; Disney Animation Japan	
Beauty and the Beast: The Enchanted Christmas	Direct-to-video	11 November 1997	Beauty and the Beast	for Disney Video Premieres	
The Lion King II: Simba's Pride	Direct-to-video	27 October 1998	The Lion King	Disney Video Premieres; Disney Animation Canada	
Winnie the Pooh: Seasons of Giving	Direct-to-video	9 November 1999	Winnie the Pooh	Disney Video Premieres; TMS Entertainment; Wang Film Productions	
An Extremely Goofy Movie	Direct-to-video	29 February 2000	Goofy	Disney Video Premieres	
The Little Mermaid II: Return to the Sea	Direct-to-video	19 September 2000	The Little Mermaid	Disney Video Premieres; Disney Animation Canada; Wang Film Productions	
Lady and the Tramp II: Scamp's Adventure	Direct-to-video	27 February 2001	Lady and the Tramp	Disney Video Premieres	
Return to Never Land	Theatrical	15 February 2002	Peter Pan	Disney MovieToons; Disney Animation Canada; Disney Animation Japan; Cornerstone Animation	
The Jungle Book 2	Theatrical	14 February 2003	The Jungle Book	DisneyToon Studios	
The Lion King 1½	Direct-to-video	10 February 2004	The Lion King	DisneyToon Studios	
Mickey, Donald, Goofy: The Three Musketeers	Direct-to-video	17 August 2004	Mickey Mouse	DisneyToon Studios	
Tarzan II	Direct-to-video	14 June 2005	Tarzan	DisneyToon Studios	
Lilo & Stitch 2: Stitch Has a Glitch	Direct-to-video	30 August 2005	Lilo & Stitch	DisneyToon Studios	
Bambi II	Theatrical/direct-to-video	7 February 2006	Bambi	DisneyToon Studios	
Brother Bear 2	Direct-to-video	29 August 2006	Brother Bear	DisneyToon Studios	
The Fox and the Hound 2	Direct-to-video	11 December 2006	The Fox and the Hound	DisneyToon Studios	
Cinderella III: A Twist in Time	Direct-to-video	6 February 2007	Cinderella	DisneyToon Studios	
The New Adventures of Winnie the Pooh	TV shows	1988–1991	Winnie the Pooh	DisneyToon Studios	Disney Television Animation
Darkwing Duck	TV shows	1991–1992	DuckTales		Disney Television Animation
Goof Troop	TV shows	1992–1993	Goof		Disney Television Animation
Bonkers	TV shows	1993–1994	Raw Toonage		Disney Television Animation
Aladdin	TV shows	1994–1995	Aladdin		Disney Television Animation
Timon & Pumbaa	TV shows	1995–1999	The Lion King		Disney Television Animation
Quack Pack	TV shows	1996	DuckTales		Disney Television Animation
Jungle Cubs	TV shows	1996–1998	The Jungle Book		Disney Television Animation

=== Walt Disney Animation Canada ===
Walt Disney Animation Canada, Inc.
- Trade name: Disney Animation Canada
- Type: Subsidiary
- Industry: Entertainment
- Founded: 1996; 30 years ago
- Defunct: 2000; 26 years ago
- Fate: Closed
- Headquarters: Canada
- Number of locations: 2
- Area served: Vancouver, British Columbia and Toronto, Ontario
- Production output: Animation
- Number of employees: 200 (2000)
- Parent: Walt Disney Television Animation (Walt Disney Feature Animation)

Walt Disney Animation Canada, Inc. (WDAC) was a Canadian animation production company and subsidiary of Disney Television Animation.

Walt Disney Animation Canada was opened in January 1996 to tap Canada's animator pool and produce direct-to-video. Industry Canada rules were dispensed by the Canadian Government with a multi-year commitment from Disney for the company.

WDAC produced in 1997 Beauty and the Beast: The Enchanted Christmas then worked with Australia and Japan subcontractors on Pocahontas II: Journey to a New World. In fall 1999, Animation Canada stopped work on Peter and Jane, a Peter Pan sequel original designed as its first theatrical release but was changed to a video release. In Spring 2000, due to weak financial performance, Animation Canada was closed. With Canada's closure, work on Peter and Jane was moved to the Australia unit.

==== Projects ====
Title	Release type	Release date	Franchise	Other production company(ies)
Beauty and the Beast: The Enchanted Christmas	Direct-to-video	11 November 1997	Beauty and the Beast	for Disney Video Premieres
Pocahontas II: Journey to a New World	Direct-to-video	25 August 1998	Pocahontas	Disney Animation Japan; for Disney Video Premieres
The Lion King II: Simba's Pride	Direct-to-video	27 October 1998	The Lion King	Disney Video Premieres; Walt Disney Animation Australia
The Little Mermaid II: Return to the Sea	Direct-to-video	September 19, 2000	The Little Mermaid	Disney Video Premiere; Walt Disney Animation Australia
Return to Never Land	Theatrical	15 February 2002	Peter Pan	Disney Animation Australia; for Disney MovieToons; Cornerstone Animation

=== Walt Disney Animation France ===
Walt Disney Feature Animation, France S.A.
- Trade name: Disney Animation France
- Formerly: Brizzi Films (1986–1989); Walt Disney Animation France; (1989–1994)
- Type: Subsidiary
- Industry: Entertainment
- Founded: 1986; 40 years ago
- Founder: Paul and Gaëtan Brizzi
- Defunct: 2003; 23 years ago
- Fate: Closed
- Headquarters: Montreuil, Paris, France
- Key people: David Stainton
- Production output: Animation
- Parent: Walt Disney Television Animation (Walt Disney Feature Animation)

Walt Disney Feature Animation, France S.A. (DAF), also credited as Walt Disney Feature Animation - Paris, France and originally named Brizzi Films, was an animation company based in Paris, France that operated from 1986 to 2007.

Brizzi Films was founded by Paul and Gaëtan Brizzi in 1986, in Paris, France. Brizzi worked on Babar in 1986 for Nelvana. In 1989, the Brizzi brothers sold the company to Disney Television Animation. The brothers continued on as general managers under the company's new name, Walt Disney Animation, France S.A. The first production they work on under Disney was DuckTales the Movie: Treasure of the Lost Lamp for Disney MovieToons. In 1990, WDA France worked on several TV shows and specials.

In 1994, the Brizzi brothers transferred to Walt Disney Feature Animation as sequence directors for The Hunchback of Notre Dame for which Disney France did 20 percent of the animation. In January 1998, David Stainton was named senior vice president of creative affairs for Walt Disney Feature Animation, where he was charged with overseeing Disney Animation France.

Stainton moved to Walt Disney Television Animation in January 2000. In summer 2003, Disney Animation France was closed.

==== Projects ====
Title	Release type	Release date	Franchise	Other production company(ies)
DuckTales the Movie: Treasure of the Lost Lamp	Theatrical	3 August 1990	DuckTales	for Disney MovieToons
TaleSpin	TV episodes	1990–91	The Jungle Book	for Walt Disney Television Animation
Winnie the Pooh and Christmas Too	TV special	14 December 1991	Winnie the Pooh	for Walt Disney Television Animation
Goof Troop	TV episodes & specials	1992	Goofy	for Walt Disney Television Animation
Marsupilami	Special	1993		for Walt Disney Television Animation
Bonkers	Special	1993–94		for Walt Disney Television Animation
A Goofy Movie	Theatrical	7 April 1995	Goofy	Disney MovieToons; Walt Disney Animation Australia; Phoenix Animation Studios
Runaway Brain	Short film	11 August 1995	Mickey Mouse	Walt Disney Feature Animation
Walt Disney Feature Animation, France S.A.
The Hunchback of Notre Dame	Feature film	21 June 1996	The Hunchback of Notre Dame	Walt Disney Feature Animation; Walt Disney Feature Animation Florida
Hercules	Feature film (10 Minutes)	27 June 1997	Hercules	Walt Disney Feature Animation; Walt Disney Feature Animation Florida
Tarzan	Feature Film	18 June 1999	Tarzan	Co-Produced with Walt Disney Feature Animation and Walt Disney Feature Animation Florida
Fantasia 2000	Animated the Firebird Suite—1919 Version Segment	1 January 2000	Fantasia	Walt Disney Feature Animation; Walt Disney Feature Animation Florida
The Emperor's New Groove	Feature film	15 December 2000	The Emperor's New Groove	Walt Disney Feature Animation; Walt Disney Feature Animation Florida
Atlantis: The Lost Empire	Feature film	15 June 2001	Atlantis	Walt Disney Feature Animation; Walt Disney Feature Animation Florida
Lilo & Stitch	Feature film	21 June 2002	Lilo & Stitch	Walt Disney Feature Animation; Walt Disney Feature Animation Florida
Treasure Planet	Feature film	27 November 2002	Treasure Planet	Walt Disney Feature Animation; Walt Disney Feature Animation Florida
The Jungle Book 2	Feature Film	14 February 2003	The Jungle Book	Walt Disney Animation Australia
Brother Bear	Feature film	1 November 2003	Brother Bear	Walt Disney Feature Animation; Walt Disney Feature Animation Florida

=== Walt Disney Animation Japan ===
Walt Disney Animation (Japan) Inc.
- Native name: ウォルト・ディズニー・アニメーション・ジャパン株式会社 ウォルト・ディズニー・テレビジョン・インターナショナル ジャパン
- Romanized name: Kabushiki gaisha Woruto Dizunī Animēshon Japan; Woruto Dizunī Terebijon Intānashonaru Japan
- Formerly: Pacific Animation Corporation
- Type: Subsidiary
- Industry: Entertainment
- Predecessor: Topcraft Limited Company
- Founded: 1984; 42 years ago
- Defunct: June 2004; 22 years ago
- Fate: Closed
- Successor: The Answer Studio; Walt Disney Japan
- Headquarters: Tokyo, Japan
- Key people: Motoyoshi Tokunaga (VP, GM)
- Production output: Animation
- Number of employees: 103 (2003)
- Parent: Disney Television Animation

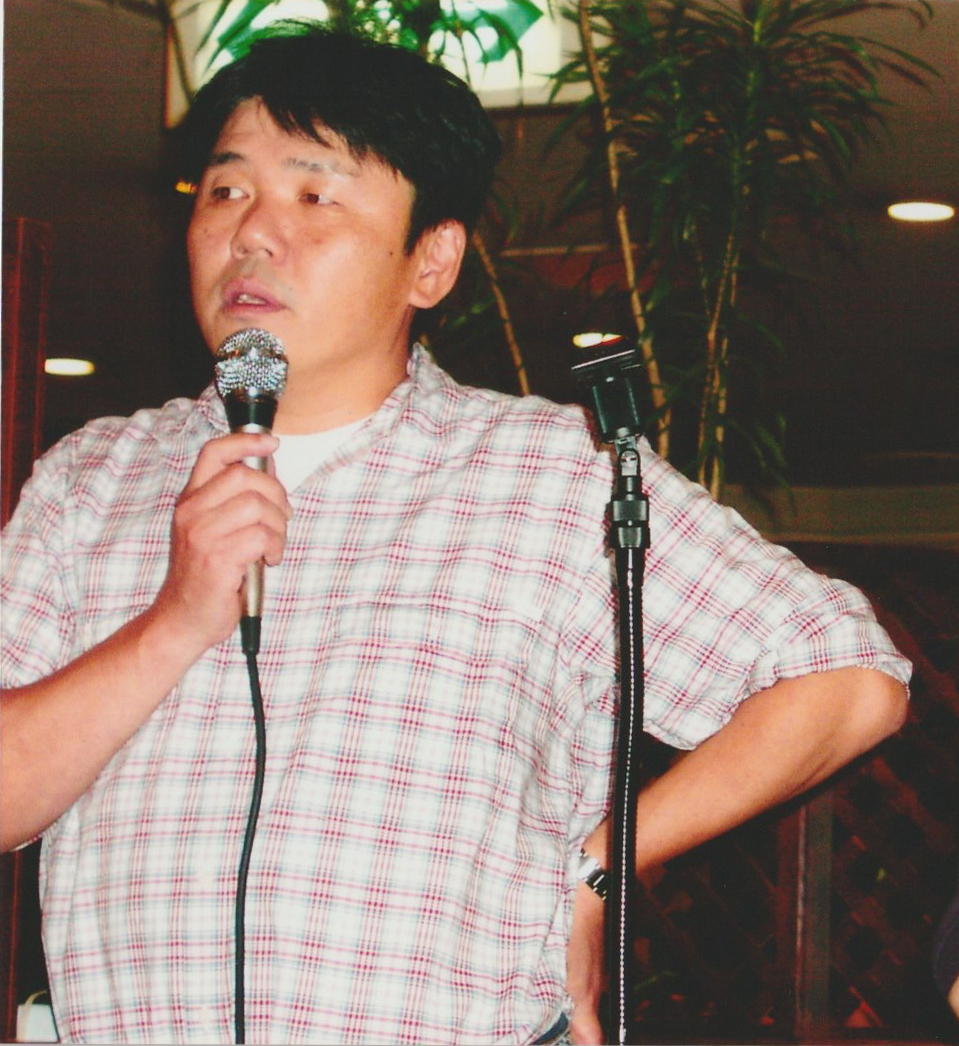
Motoyoshi Tokunaga, President of Walt Disney Animation (Japan) in 2002

Walt Disney Animation Japan (ウォルト・ディズニー・アニメーション・ジャパン株式会社, Kabushiki gaisha Woruto Dizunī Animēshon Japan) (WDAJ), officially Walt Disney Animation (Japan) Inc., and formerly known as Pacific Animation Corporation (パシフィックアニメーション株式会社, Pashifikku animēshon kabushiki gaisha), also known as Walt Disney Television International Japan (ウォルト・ディズニー・テレビジョン・インターナショナル ジャパン, Woruto Dizunī Terebijon Intānashonaru Japan) (WDTVI-J), was an animation production subsidiary of Disney Television Animation, a component of the Walt Disney Company, which is in charge of Disney's television business in Japan. Pacific Animation Corporation was one of two animation firms that formed after the end of Topcraft Limited Company in 1984, with the other being Studio Ghibli. Pacific Animation did three TV series and 1 television film for Rankin/Bass. In 1988, the Walt Disney Company purchased Pacific Animation Corporation, which was renamed as Walt Disney Animation Japan.

The Japanese studio was set up to provide the animation services for Disney's animated television series in 1989. As direct-to-video increased in importance, the overseas studios moved to making feature films.

DAJ worked on The Tigger Movie (2000). In 2003, the company produced Piglet's Big Movie for DisneyToon Studios and 101 Dalmatians II: Patch's London Adventure. In September 2003, Disney announced the closure of the studio, with Pooh's Heffalump Movie (2005) to be its final work.

DAJ was closed in June 2004 with 30 employees expected to be transferred to one of the two Disney's remaining animation units. With the closure of the Japanese studio, its remaining work for DisneyToon Studios was split between its US and Australia animation units. Employees not transferred decided to launch a new company, The Answer Studio.

==== Projects ====
Title	Release type	Release date	Franchise	Other production company(ies)
Pacific Animation
Button Nose	TV show episodes	1985		for Sanrio
The Life and Adventures of Santa Claus	TV film	1985		for Rankin/Bass Productions
ThunderCats	TV show episodes	1985		for Rankin/Bass Productions
SilverHawks	TV show episodes	1986		for Rankin/Bass Productions
The Comic Strip	TV show episodes	1987		for Rankin/Bass Productions
Peppermint Rose	TV special	1992		for Muller-Stratford Productions
Disney Animation Japan
Disney's Adventures of the Gummi Bears	TV shows	1989–1990		Disney Television Animation
Chip 'n Dale: Rescue Rangers	TV shows	1990		Disney Television Animation
TaleSpin	TV shows	1990–1991	The Jungle Book	Disney Television Animation
Darkwing Duck	TV shows	1991–1992		Disney Television Animation
The Little Mermaid	TV shows	1992	The Little Mermaid	Disney Television Animation
Goof Troop	TV shows	1992		Disney Television Animation
Bonkers	TV shows	1993	Raw Toonage	Disney Television Animation
Aladdin	TV shows	1994–1995	Aladdin	Disney Television Animation
101 Dalmatians: The Series	TV shows	1997	101 Dalmatians	Disney Television Animation
Hercules	TV shows	1998	Hercules	Disney Television Animation
Buzz Lightyear of Star Command	TV shows	2000	Toy Story	Disney Television Animation
Aladdin and the King of Thieves	Direct-to-video	August 13, 1996	Aladdin	Disney Animation Australia; Disney Video Premieres
Pooh's Grand Adventure: The Search for Christopher Robin	Direct-to-video	August 5, 1997	Winnie the Pooh	Disney Video Premieres
Pocahontas II: Journey to a New World	Direct-to-video	August 25, 1998	Pocahontas	Disney Animation Canada; Disney Video Premiere
The Tigger Movie	Theatrical	February 11, 2000	Winnie the Pooh	Walt Disney Television Animation; DisneyMovie Toons
Buzz Lightyear of Star Command: The Adventure Begins	Direct-to-video	August 8, 2000	Toy Story	Walt Disney Television Animation; Jade Animation
Return to Never Land	Theatrical	February 15, 2002	Peter Pan	Disney Animation Australia; Disney Animation Canada; Disney Movietoons; Cornerstone Animation
The Hunchback of Notre Dame II	Direct-to-video	March 19, 2002	The Hunchback of Notre Dame	Walt Disney Television Animation; Disney Video Premiere
Winnie the Pooh: A Very Merry Pooh Year	Direct-to-video	12 November 2002	Winnie the Pooh	Walt Disney Television Animation; Disney Video Premiere
101 Dalmatians II: Patch's London Adventure	Direct-to-video	January 21, 2003	101 Dalmatians	Walt Disney Television Animation; Disney Video Premiere
Piglet's Big Movie	Theatrical	March 21, 2003	Winnie the Pooh	DisneyToon Studios
Pooh's Heffalump Movie	Theatrical	February 11, 2005	Winnie the Pooh	DisneyToon Studios

=== Walt Disney Animation U.K. ===
Walt Disney Animation U.K., Ltd.
- Trade name: Disney Animation U.K.
- Type: Subsidiary
- Industry: Entertainment
- Founded: 1986; 40 years ago
- Defunct: 1991; 35 years ago
- Fate: Closed
- Headquarters: Camden Town, London, England, Great Britain, United Kingdom
- Production output: Animation
- Parent: Walt Disney Television Animation; DisneyToon Studios; (Walt Disney Animation Studios)

Walt Disney Animation U.K., Limited (DAE), was an animation studio based in England, Great Britain, United Kingdom that operated from 1986 to 1991.

This short-lived unit was set up in Camden Town, London in 1986 for the animation production of The Great Mouse Detective produced by Walt Disney Feature Animation and Who Framed Roger Rabbit, using a combination of animators from Burbank, Richard Williams' associates and animators from all over Europe (many of whom would later join the prestigious Feature Animation unit in Burbank when Roger Rabbit had finished production). In 1990, the first production they worked on under Disney was DuckTales the Movie: Treasure of the Lost Lamp for Disney MovieToons and Walt Disney Animation, France S.A. In summer 1991, Disney Animation U.K. Limited; the last thing that the British animation studios ever animated were two episodes of TaleSpin and one episode of The New Adventures of Winnie the Pooh.

==== Projects ====
Title	Release type	Release date	Franchise	Other production company(ies)	Episode
Who Framed Roger Rabbit	Theatrical	22 June 1988	Who Framed Roger Rabbit	Walt Disney Animation Studios; Richard Williams Studio; Industrial Light & Magic	
DuckTales the Movie: Treasure of the Lost Lamp	Theatrical	3 August 1990	DuckTales	Disney MovieToons; Disney Animation France	
The New Adventures of Winnie the Pooh	TV show	1990	Winnie the Pooh	Disney Television Animation	"April Pooh"
TaleSpin	TV show	1991	The Jungle Book	Disney Television Animation; Disney Animation France	"Pizza Pie in the Sky" and "The Incredible Shrinking Molly"

=== Walt Disney Animation Studios Vancouver ===
Walt Disney Animation Studios Vancouver
- Type: Division
- Industry: Entertainment
- Founded: August 2021; 5 years ago
- Headquarters: Vancouver, British Columbia, Canada
- Production output: Animation
- Parent: Walt Disney Animation Studios (Walt Disney Studios)

Walt Disney Animation Studios Vancouver is a division of Walt Disney Animation Studios. The division was open on August 4, 2021, and began operations in January 2022. Amir Nasrabadi, former finance lead at Disney Animation, was the head of the studio until moving to Netflix Animation Studios in 2025. The studio works on Disney Animation's future long-term series, specials, and movies, with its first work being Moana 2. By March 2025, Disney Animation announced they will no longer be producing long-term series, with an unspecified number of staff being laid off from the studio as a result of this decision.

==== Projects ====
Release date	Title	Notes
2023	Once Upon a Studio	Co-production with Walt Disney Animation Studios
2024	Iwájú	Co-production with Walt Disney Animation Studios, Kugali Media, and Cinesite
2024	Moana 2	Co-produced with Walt Disney Animation Studios
2025	Zootopia 2	Co-produced with Walt Disney Animation Studios
TBA	Untitled The Princess and the Frog special	Co-produced with Walt Disney Animation Studios

== ImageMovers Digital ==
In 2007, The Walt Disney Company and ImageMovers set up a joint venture animation facility, ImageMovers Digital, a Marin County-based film company, where Robert Zemeckis would produce and direct 3D animated films using performance capture technology. ImageMovers Digital closed operations by January 2011, after the production was completed on Mars Needs Moms.

== See also ==
- Laugh-O-Gram Studio
