= Practice Life =

Single by Andy Griggs with Martina McBride

from the album Freedom
- Released: September 21, 2002
- Genre: Country
- Length: 4:13
- Label: RCA Nashville
- Songwriter(s): Andy Griggs, Brett James
- Producer(s): David Malloy

Andy Griggs singles chronology
"Tonight I Wanna Be Your Man" (2002)	"Practice Life" (2002)	"She Thinks She Needs Me" (2004)

Martina McBride singles chronology
"Where Would You Be" (2002)	"Practice Life" (2002)	"Concrete Angel" (2002)

"Practice Life" is a song recorded by American country music artists Andy Griggs and Martina McBride. It was released in September 2002 as the third and final single from Griggs' album Freedom. The song reached #33 on the Billboard Hot Country Singles & Tracks chart. The song was written by Griggs and Brett James.

== Chart performance ==
Chart (2002)	Peak position
US Hot Country Songs (Billboard)	33
