= Yokosawa =

Yokosawa (written: 横澤) is a Japanese surname. Notable people with the surname include:

- Natsuko Yokosawa (横澤 夏子, born 1990), Japanese actress and comedian
- Yuki Yokosawa (横澤 由貴, born 1980), Japanese judoka
