= I'll Go Crazy =

I'll Go Crazy may refer to:

- "I'll Go Crazy" (James Brown song) by James Brown & The Famous Flames
- "I'll Go Crazy" (Andy Griggs song)
- "I'll Go Crazy If I Don't Go Crazy Tonight", by U2
