= The Answer Studio =

Japanese animation studio

The Answer Studio Co., Ltd.

- Native name: 株式会社アンサー・スタジオ
- Romanized name: Kabushiki-gaisha Ansā sutajio
- Type: Kabushiki gaisha
- Industry: Japanese animation
- Predecessor: Walt Disney Animation Japan
- Founded: June 2004; 22 years ago
- Founder: Motoyoshi Tokunaga
- Headquarters: Sakura Kamiogi Building, Kamiogi, Suginami, Tokyo, Japan
- Number of employees: 80
- Website: answerstudio.co.jp

The Answer Studio Co., Ltd. (Japanese: アンサー・スタジオ) is a Japanese animation studio founded in June 2004 by Motoyoshi Tokunaga and headquartered in Tokyo. Formed after the closure of Walt Disney Animation Japan, the studio has collaborated on and produced animation projects, including television series, films, OVAs and ONAs. It had worked with CoMix Wave Films on Makoto Shinkai’s films, such as Your Name (2016), and with DC Entertainment and Warner Bros. Animation on projects like Batman: Gotham by Gaslight (2018), alongside productions like Golgo 13 (2008–2009) and Tower of God – Season 2 (2024).

== History ==
The history of The Answerstudio is linked to several predecessor studios. Its lineage traces back to Topcraft, established in 1972 by former Toei Animation producer Toru Hara. Topcraft became known for its collaborations with Rankin/Bass Productions on animated films such as The Hobbit (1977), The Return of the King (1980), and The Last Unicorn (1982). Despite its achievements, Topcraft faced financial difficulties and filed for bankruptcy, leading to its dissolution on June 15, 1985. After completing Nausicaä of the Valley of the Wind (1984) with Hayao Miyazaki, Topcraft split, with some talent, including Toru Hara, forming Studio Ghibli, while others established Pacific Animation Corporation.

In 1988, The Walt Disney Company acquired Pacific Animation Corporation and renamed it Walt Disney Animation Japan. This studio produced television series and direct-to-video works, including The Tigger Movie (2000) and Piglet’s Big Movie (2003). Disney announced the closure of Walt Disney Animation Japan in September 2003, with Pooh’s Heffalump Movie (2005) as its final work.

Following the closure, Motoyoshi Tokunaga, former vice president and general manager of the studio, founded The Answerstudio in June 2004. Tokunaga secured a loan to establish the new company and reassembled many of the animators and staff from the former Disney Japan team.

== Works ==
=== Television ===
Title	First run start date	First run end date	Director(s)	Eps.	Note(s)	Refs.
Super Robot Monkey Team Hyperforce Go!	September 18, 2004	December 16, 2006	Ciro Nieli, Fumio Maezono, Alan Wan	52	Produced by Jetix, American-Japanese Production	
Nepos Napos	January 31, 2005	July 25, 2005	Hiroshi Kawamata, Shunji Oga	26	Original	
Transformers: Animated	December 26, 2007	May 23, 2009	Matt Youngberg (Note: chief director)	13	Produced by Cartoon Network Studios	
Golgo 13	April 12, 2008	March 28, 2009	Shunji Oga	50	Based on a manga by Takao Saito	
Otona Joshi no Anime Time	January 6, 2011	March 24, 2013	Hiroshi Kawamata	1	TV special	
Shimajiro: A World of WOW!	April 2, 2012	TBA	Takamitsu Kawamura	680+	Original, Produced by Benesse	
Tower of God – Season 2	July 7, 2024	December 29, 2024	Kazuyoshi Takeuchi, Akira Suzuki	26	Based on a webtoon by S.I.U.	
Anne Shirley	April 5, 2025	September 27, 2025	Hiroshi Kawamata	24	Based on a novel by L. M. Montgomery	

=== Films ===
Release date	Title	Director(s)	Note(s)	Refs.
August 8, 2007	Flag Director's Edition	Ryousuke Takahashi & Kazuo Terada	Compilation of Flag ONA	
January 17, 2009	Armored Trooper Votoms: Pailsen Files Movie	Ryousuke Takahashi	Co-production with Sunrise	
May 7, 2010	Rainbow Magic: Return to Rainspell Island	Hiroshi Kawamata	Co-production with HIT Entertainment	
October 28, 2010	Hal's Flute	Hiroshi Kawamata	Co-production with TMS Entertainment	
March 19, 2012	Juju the Weightless Dugong	Hiroshi Kawamata	Original, Part of Anime Mirai	
March 15, 2013	Shimajirō to Fufu no Daibouken	Isamu Hirabayashi		
March 14, 2014	Shimajirō to Kujira no Uta	Hiroshi Kawamata & Isamu Hirabayashi		
March 13, 2015	Shimajirō to Ookinaki	Hiroshi Kawamata & Isamu Hirabayashi		
March 11, 2016	Shimajirō to Ehon no Kuni	Hiroshi Kawamata & Isamu Hirabayashi		
March 10, 2017	Shimajirō to Niji no Oasis	Isamu Hirabayashi		
March 9, 2018	Eiga Shimajirō Mahou no Shima no Daibouken	Takashima Hiro & Hiroshi Kawamata	Co-production with Back Street	
March 15, 2019	Shimajirō to Ururu no Hero Land	Takamitsu Kawamura	Co-production with Back Street	
March 11, 2022	Shimajirō to Kirakira Oukoku no Oujisama	Takamitsu Kawamura		
September 8, 2023	City Hunter The Movie: Angel Dust	Kazuyoshi Takeuchi	Co-production with Sunrise	
July 17, 2026	You, Fireworks, and Our Promise	Kei Suzuki	Co-production with SynergySP	

=== Original video animations (OVAs) ===
Release date	Title	Director(s)	Eps.	Refs.
October 26, 2007	Armored Trooper Votoms: Pailsen Files	Ryousuke Takahashi	12	
April 23, 2008	Takashi Yanase Fairy Tale Theatre	Hiroshi Kawamata	30	
March 26, 2010	Armored Trooper Votoms: Phantom Arc	Ryosuke Takahashi	6	

=== Original net animations (ONAs) ===
Release date	Title	Director(s)	Eps.	Note(s)	Refs.
June 16, 2006	Flag	Ryosuke Takahashi & Kazuo Terada	13	Co-production with Aniplex	
October 11, 2017	Road to You: Kimi e to Tsuzuku Michi	Hiroshi Kawamata	1		
October 20, 2022	Modern Love Tokyo: He's Playing Our Song	Naoko Yamada	1	Seventh episode	

=== Support ===
Year	Title	Type	Production	Note(s)	Refs.
2010	Batman: Under the Red Hood	OVA	DC Entertainment, Warner Bros. Animation	Animation Production	
2011	Children Who Chase Lost Voices	Film	CoMix Wave Films	Animation Production Assistance	
2013	The Garden of Words	Film	CoMix Wave Films	Animation Production Assistance	
2014	Son of Batman	OVA	DC Entertainment, Warner Bros. Animation	Animation Production	
2015	Batman vs. Robin	OVA	DC Entertainment, Warner Bros. Animation	Animation Production	
2016	Batman: Bad Blood	OVA	DC Entertainment, Warner Bros. Animation	Animation Production	
2016	Your Name	Film	CoMix Wave Films	Animation Production Cooperation	
2016	Batman: The Killing Joke	OVA	DC Entertainment, Warner Bros. Animation	Animation Production	
2016	DC Super Hero Girls: Hero of the Year	OVA	DC Entertainment, Warner Bros. Animation	Animation Production	
2017	Teen Titans: The Judas Contract	OVA	DC Entertainment, Warner Bros. Animation	Animation Production	
2018	Batman: Gotham by Gaslight	OVA	DC Entertainment, Warner Bros. Animation	Animation Production	
2018	Flavors of Youth	Film	CoMix Wave Films, Haoliners Animation League	Animation Production Assistance	
2018	Marvel Rising: Secret Warriors	OVA	Marvel Animation	Production Assistance	
2019	Weathering With You	Film	CoMix Wave Films	Production Cooperation	
2020	Superman: Man of Tomorrow	OVA	DC Entertainment, Warner Bros. Animation	Animation Production	
2022	Suzume	Film	CoMix Wave Films	Production Assistance	

=== Other works ===
Year	Title	Director	Note(s)	Refs.
2014	Z-Kai: Cross Road	Makoto Shinkai	Production	
2020	Marukome "Taste of Restaurant" Anime CM- Together Forever	Kenya Hirata	Animation Production	
2021	Marukome "Taste of Restaurant" Anime CM- Be Careful!	Kenya Hirata	Animation Production	
2021	Seven-Eleven Japan Anime CM	Hiroshi Kawamata	Animation Production	
2022	Marukome "Taste of Restaurant" Anime CM- Memories of Summer Vacation	Kenya Hirata	Animation Production	
2022	KitKat Japan TV CM	Naoko Yamada	Animation Production	

== Notable staff ==
=== Representative staff ===
Motoyoshi Tokunaga

=== Animation staff ===
- Hiroshi Kawamata
- Kazuyoshi Takeuchi
- Ryousuke Takahashi
- Yuji Watanabe
- Kazuo Terada
- Shunji Oga
- Seigo Kitazawa
