= Last of the Good Guys =

Studio album by One Flew South
- Released: May 27, 2008
- Genre: Country
- Label: Decca
- Producer: Marcus Hummon

Professional ratings
Review scores
Source	Rating
Allmusic	3.5/5 stars
Country Weekly	3.5/5 stars

Last of the Good Guys is the debut album of the American country music group One Flew South. It was released on Decca Records Nashville on May 27, 2008. The album's debut single, "My Kind of Beautiful" (co-written and previously recorded by Andy Griggs on his 2005 album This I Gotta See), was released to radio in June 2008, and charted on the Billboard Hot Country Songs charts. The album peaked at #67 on the Top Country Albums charts.

== Track listing ==
1. "Last of the Good Guys" (Marcus Hummon) – 4:30
2. "My Kind of Beautiful" (Hummon, Andy Griggs, Darrell Scott) – 4:00
3. "Junkie" (Hummon) – 4:44
4. "Life" (Billy Mann, Chris Roberts) – 4:14
5. "She's a Gift" (Eddie Bush, JD Souther) – 3:52
6. "Sara" (Hummon, Bush, Royal Reed, Chris Roberts) – 3:20
7. "It Is Good" (Hummon, Souther) – 3:30
8. "Shameless" (Bush, Reed, Roberts, Hummon, Jez Ashurst) – 3:47
9. "Let the Day Carry You" (Bush, Souther) – 3:27
10. "Makin' It Rain" (Hummon, Bush, Reed, Roberts) – 3:37
11. "Blue Highways" (Reed, Roberts, Bill Deasy) – 4:02
12. "Too Old to Die Young" (Kevin Welch, John Hadley, Scott Dooley) – 2:17

== Personnel ==
=== One Flew South ===
- Eddie Bush – vocals, acoustic guitar, electric guitar, gut string guitar
- Royal Reed – vocals
- Chris Roberts – vocals

=== Additional musicians ===
- Chad Cromwell – drums
- Dan Dugmore – pedal steel guitar
- John Gardner – drums, djembe
- Marcus Hummon – acoustic guitar, 12-string guitar, mandolin, piano
- George Marinelli – 12 string guitar, electric guitar
- Dave Matthews – keyboards, percussion
- Mark Prentice – bass guitar
- Darrell Scott – mandolin
- Michael Severs – electric guitar
- Wanda Vick – mandolin, banjo, Dobro
- Jonathan Yudkin – fiddle

== Chart performance ==
Chart (2008)	Peak position
U.S. Billboard Top Country Albums	67
