= One Flew South =

American musical group

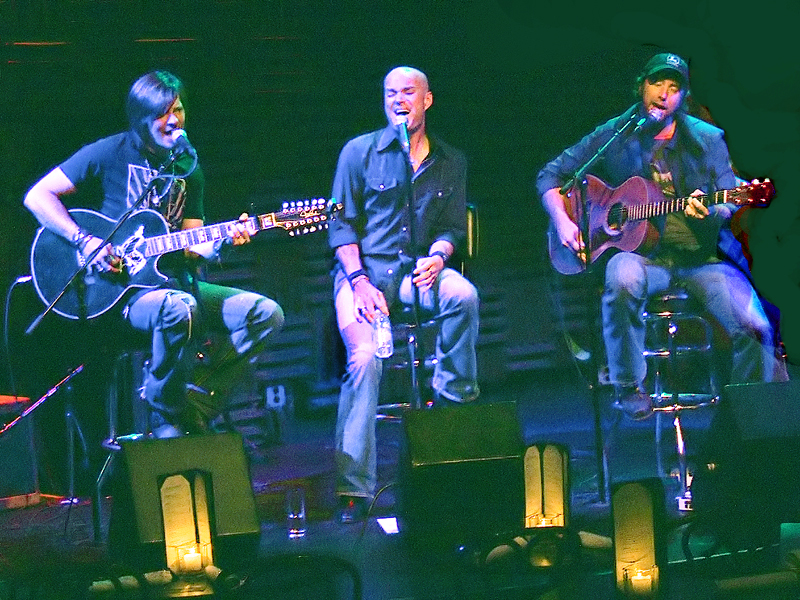

Background information
- Origin: Nashville, Tennessee, United States
- Genres: Country
- Years active: 2005-2009
- Label: Decca
- Past members: Eddie Bush; Royal Reed; Chris Roberts
- Website: http://www.oneflewsouth.com/

One Flew South was an American country music group composed of Eddie Bush, Chris Roberts, and Royal Reed, all three of whom sing lead vocals and play acoustic guitar. The group's first recording was a song for the soundtrack to the 2006 Disney animated film The Fox and the Hound 2. In 2007, One Flew South signed to Decca Records, releasing their debut album Last of the Good Guys in May 2008. The album featured collaborations with Marcus Hummon and JD Souther, producing the single "My Kind of Beautiful" which charted on the Billboard Hot Country Songs charts.

== Biography ==
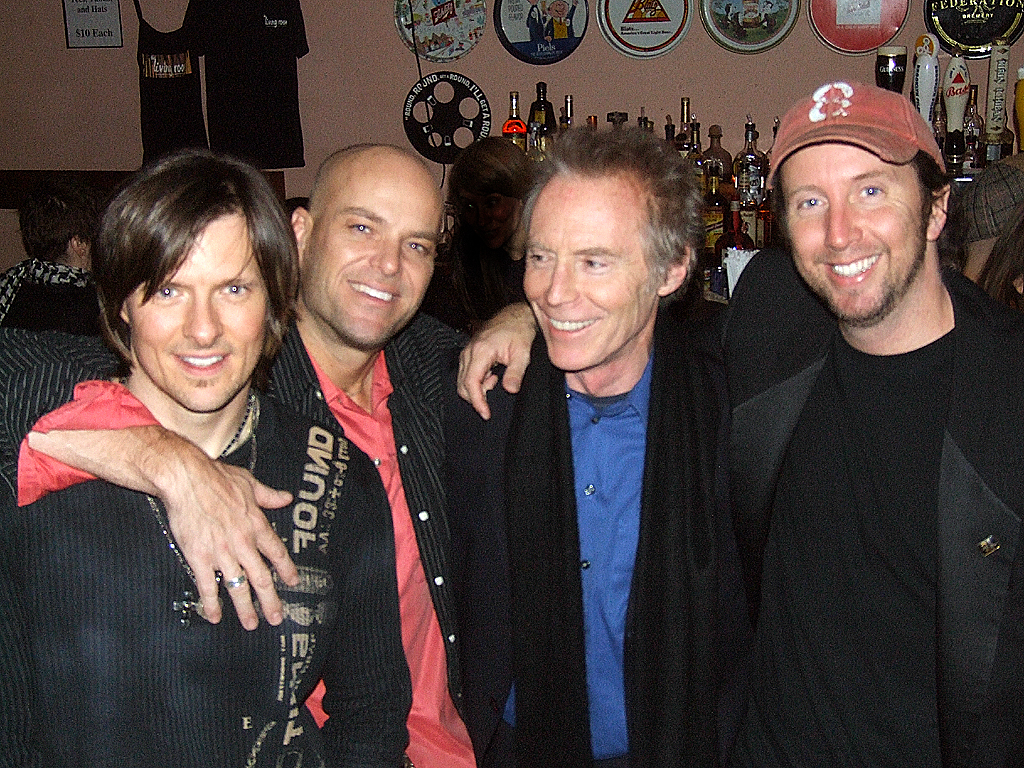
Eddie Bush, Royal Reed, JD Souther, Chris Roberts

After a solo career, Royal Reed, a native of El Paso, Texas, met Chris Roberts, a native of New Orleans in the late 1990s while both were starring in a production of the Broadway musical The Civil War, alongside singer Larry Gatlin in New York City. Gatlin, who had once fronted a trio which also included his two brothers (Larry Gatlin & The Gatlin Brothers) mentored Reed and Roberts suggesting they add a third member to complete their vocal-centric group. Initially, they could not find a suitable third member for the trio. Eventually, they befriended Marcus Hummon with whom they began to write songs. Through Hummon, the two discovered South Carolina native Eddie Bush who was added to the group in 2005. The three members discovered that they worked well together as a vocal trio, and they chose the name One Flew South. All three sing lead vocals on their songs.

One Flew South's first recording was the song "Friends for Life" which Hummon co-wrote; the trio recorded the song on the soundtrack to the 2006 film The Fox and the Hound 2. After the song was released, the trio began recording demo tapes while seeking a record deal. With Hummon's help they were signed to a recording contract with Decca Records in 2007, as well as a publishing contract with Sony/ATV Publishing. Their debut album, Last of the Good Guys was released on May 27, 2008, debuting at No. 67 on the Billboard Top Country Albums charts; Most of the album's songs were co-written by the group's three members along with Hummon and rock songwriter JD Souther. Hummon also produced the album in addition to playing guitar, piano, and mandolin on it. The album's lead-off single, "My Kind of Beautiful" was co-written by Andy Griggs, who previously recorded it on his 2005 album This I Gotta See. It went for radio adds on June 2 and debuted at No. 57 on the Billboard Hot Country Songs charts for the chart week of June 21, 2008 where it stayed for a week. For the week of August 16, 2008, the song re-entered the Hot Country Songs charts at No. 56.

== Discography ==
=== Albums ===
Title	Album details	Peak positions
Title	Album details	US Country
Last of the Good Guys	Release date: May 27, 2008; Label: Decca Nashville	67

=== Singles ===
Year	Single	Peak positions	Album
Year	Single	US Country	Album
2008	"My Kind of Beautiful"	54	Last of the Good Guys
2009	"Life"	—	Last of the Good Guys
"—" denotes releases that did not chart

=== Music videos ===
Year	Video
2008	"My Kind of Beautiful"
