= Break of Dawn (manga) =

Japanese manga series and its adaptation

- First tankōbon volume cover, featuring Yuma Sawatari (top) and Nanako (bottom); behind them are Ginnosuke Tadokoro (left) and Shingo Kishi (right)

ぼくらのよあけ (Bokura no Yoake)
- Genre: Coming-of-age; Science fiction
- Manga
- Written by: Tetsuya Imai
- Published by: Kodansha
- English publisher: NA: Kodansha USA
- Imprint: Afternoon KC
- Magazine: Monthly Afternoon
- Original run: January 25, 2011 – October 25, 2011
- Volumes: 2
- Anime film
- Directed by: Tomoyuki Kurokawa
- Written by: Dai Satō
- Music by: Masaru Yokoyama
- Studio: Zero-G
- Released: October 21, 2022
- Runtime: 120 minutes
- icon

Break of Dawn (Japanese: ぼくらのよあけ, Hepburn: Bokura no Yoake; lit. 'Our Dawn') is a Japanese manga series by Tetsuya Imai. It was serialized in Kodansha's seinen manga magazine Monthly Afternoon from January to October 2011, with its chapters collected in two tankōbon volumes. An anime film adaptation by Zero-G premiered in Japan in October 2022.

== Plot ==
In late July 2010, (Note: 2022 in the anime film) an AI-powered satellite named SHIII (Note: Pronounced "SH3") makes a close encounter with a comet over Earth. A piece of the comet breaks off, crashing near an apartment complex in Asagaya, Tokyo. Three school friends—Haruka Endo, Ryo Sawatari, and Yoshitatsu Kawai—discover an orb-shaped object at the site. The object, communicating through Haruka's phone, identifies itself as February Dawn, an artificially intelligent probe from the planet "Rainbow's Wellspring" (虹の根元, Niji no Nemoto) that has explored the universe for over 12,000 years. Without suitable technology to return it to space, the friends promise to return in the future, hiding it on Building 30's rooftop and each keeping its three cores for themselves so its memory is temporarily wiped.

28 years later (Note: 27 years later in the anime film) in a technologically-advanced Japan, reports of the comet, dubbed SHIII-Arville, approaching Earth in a month excites fourth-grade space enthusiast Yuma, the son of Haruka and Ryo. However, he is constantly annoyed by his autobot Nanako, an airborne robot who micromanages his activities and whose AI is descended from SHIII, which is soon to be decommissioned. After Yuma leaves to hang out with his friends, Shingo Kishi and Ginnosuke Tadokoro, Nanako randomly detects February Dawn on her way to retrieve him.

Escorting Yuma back, Nanako suddenly shuts down and reboots with February Dawn's consciousness, flying up to Building 30. Yuma and his friends follow her to the rooftop. Communicating through Nanako, February Dawn uses water to activate and project visuals of its origins, thanking SHIII for teaching it to communicate. Noticing two of its cores are already placed, a screen projection through Nanako shows a girl named Honoka possessing the third core; hearing the boys' pleas, Honoka reluctantly accepts their requests to return it.

Honoka struggles with low self-esteem from her unpopularity with other girls, especially her rival, Wako. Meeting up with Yuma and his friends, she recognizes Shingo as Wako's younger brother and storms off. With Honoka avoiding them at school, the boys secretly follow her home, meeting her father Yoshitatsu while she is out with her mother. Despite being elated about February Dawn's reawakening, Yoshitatsu refuses to give the core himself, advising the boys to reconcile with Honoka instead. At a restaurant, Honoka is advised by her mother to do the same with them. The following day, she meets up with the boys and visits February Dawn. Having kept Nanako unaware of what was happening to her, Yuma lets her see the probe with the third core placed.

Meanwhile, Wako discovers all her friends have spontaneously abandoned her. Hurt by this, she sees Shingo's bike near Building 30 and climbs to the rooftop, finding Honoka with them. A fight ensues and Honoka unintentionally pushes Shingo off the roof, but Wako grabs him in time. Haruka, notified through Nanako, arrives and orders them all to leave. In a flashback, it is revealed that shortly after the probe was left alone, Ryo became overwhelmed with schoolwork and Yoshitatsu was moving to Fukuoka within months. Conversing with Haruka on the rooftop, Yoshitatsu confesses feelings for her but becomes jealous when she declines. Attempting to calm him down, Haruka accidentally shoves him off the building.

Haruka calls Ryo to return from work and reestablishes contact with Yoshitatsu with Honoka's help. The three meet up in a restaurant, bringing Honoka, Nanako, Yuma and his friends, where they agree to help them launch February Dawn. Honoka, seeing Wako being bullied by her former friends in a store, uses February Dawn's power to expose the friends shoplifting before making peace with Wako. On the eve of Comet SHIII-Arville's closest encounter, the group uses water bottles and the apartment complex's electricity in preparation of launching February Dawn, but are thwarted when two neighborhood kids spill water out. Without enough time, Nanako suggests sacrificing herself to launch the probe despite Yuma's protests, revealing that February Dawn inadvertently changed her, and risks losing her memories if she stays behind. Exchanging goodbyes, Nanako transfers her AI to February Dawn and, with her power, launches it to space as her body shuts down permanently.

Another 28 years later, Yuma remains in contact with Nanako. SHIII, now an autobot, joins him in boarding the first manned spacecraft to go beyond the Solar System, The Dawn.

== Characters ==
Yuma Sawatari (沢渡 悠真, Sawatari Yūma)
Voiced by: Hana Sugisaki
Nanako (ナナコ)
Voiced by: Aoi Yūki
Shingo Kishi (岸 真悟, Kishi Shingo)
Voiced by: Natsumi Fujiwara
Ginnosuke Tadokoro (田所 銀之介, Tadokoro Ginnosuke)
Voiced by: Nobuhiko Okamoto
Honoka Kawai (河合 花香, Kawai Honoka)
Voiced by: Inori Minase
Wako Kishi (岸 わこ, Kishi Wako)
Voiced by: Haruka Tomatsu
February Dawn (二月の黎明号, Nigatsu no Reimei-gō)
Voiced by: Romi Park
Haruka Sawatari (沢渡 はるか, Sawatari Haruka; birth name Haruka Endo (遠藤 はるか, Endo Haruka))
Voiced by: Kana Hanazawa
Ryo Sawatari (沢渡 遼, Sawatari Ryō)
Voiced by: Yoshimasa Hosoya
Yoshitatsu Kawai (河合 義達, Kawai Yoshitatsu)
Voiced by: Kenjiro Tsuda
Mifuyu Kishi (岸 みふゆ, Kishi Mifuyu)
Voiced by: Natsuko Yokosawa

== Media ==
=== Manga ===
Written and illustrated by Tetsuya Imai, Break of Dawn was serialized in Kodansha's seinen manga magazine Monthly Afternoon from January 25 to October 25, 2011. Kodansha collected its chapters in two tankōbon volumes, released respectively on June 23 and November 22, 2011.

In July 2022, Kodansha USA announced that they licensed the series for an English print release. One omnibus volume compiling the two original volumes was released on February 14, 2023, for both digital and print.

==== Volumes ====
No.	Original release date	Original ISBN	English release date	English ISBN
1	June 23, 2011	978-4-06-310758-6	February 14, 2023 (omnibus)	978-1-68491-905-5 (digital); 978-1-64651-815-9 (print)
1. "The Comet & The Roof" (彗星と屋上, Suisei to Okujō); 2. "The Pool & The Blue Planet" (プールと青い星, Pūru to Aoi Hoshi); 3. "A Lie & A Secret" (嘘とないしょの話, Uso to Naisho no Hanashi); 4. "Milk Bottle & Frogs" (牛乳ビンとカエル, Gyūnyū Bin to Kaeru); 5. "Rain Shower & Tag" (夕立と追いかけっこ, Yūdachi to Oikakekko)
2	November 22, 2011	978-4-06-310791-3	February 14, 2023 (omnibus)	978-1-68491-905-5 (digital); 978-1-64651-815-9 (print)
6. "Ice Cream & Waffles" (アイスとワッフル, Aisu to Waffuru); 7. "Water & A T-Shirt" (水とTシャツ, Mizu to Tīshatsu); 8. "Cell Phone & Memories" (携帯電話と記憶, Keitai Denwa to Kioku); 9. "Plastic Bottles & Bicycles" (ペットボトルと自転車, Pettobotoru to Jitensha); 10. "Break of Dawn" (ぼくらのよあけ, Bokura no Yoake); Bonus: "Shiva" (シャナナ, Shanana)

=== Anime film ===
In March 2022, it was announced that an anime film adaptation was in production. The film was produced by Zero-G, directed by Tomoyuki Kurokawa, written by Dai Satō, characters designed by Pomodorosa, and music composed by Masaru Yokoyama. It premiered in Japan on October 21, 2022. The film's theme song, "Itsushika" (Before You Know It), is performed by Daichi Miura.

== Reception ==
Reviewing the 2022 anime film adaptation, Robbie Collin of The Daily Telegraph rated it three stars out of five, likening its premise to Stranger Things with "a far more leisurely pace", appreciating the "sympathetic" characters and Zero-G's animation. However, Collins felt the story was lacking, stating "[at] two hours to fill, the plotting meanders to a fault, while the otherwise lovely animation lacks the sort of grabbily bizarre imagery such a story cries out for", though concluding "[the film is] slow to get going, but all the more gladdening when it does."

== See also ==
- Alice & Zoroku, another manga series by the same author
