= Freedom (Andy Griggs album) =

Studio album by Andy Griggs
- Released: May 28, 2002
- Recorded: 2001–2 at Emerald Studios and Starstruck Studios, Nashville, TN
- Genre: Country
- Length: 49:28
- Label: RCA Nashville
- Producer: David Malloy

Andy Griggs chronology
You Won't Ever Be Lonely (1999)	Freedom (2002)	This I Gotta See (2004)

Singles from Freedom
- 1. "How Cool Is That" Released: 2001; 2. "Tonight I Wanna Be Your Man" Released: January 21, 2002; 3. "Practice Life" Released: 2002

Professional ratings
Review scores
Source	Rating
AllMusic	4/5 stars

Freedom is the second studio album by American country music singer Andy Griggs. Released in 2002 on RCA Records Nashville, it features the singles "How Cool Is That", "Tonight I Wanna Be Your Man", and "Practice Life", a duet with Martina McBride; respectively, these reached No. 22, No. 7, and No. 33 on the Hot Country Songs chart in 2002.

== Track listing ==
No.	Title	Writer(s)	Length
1.	"Freedom"	Zack Turner, Lonnie Wilson, Andy Griggs	3:42
2.	"The Road to Lasting Love"	Michael Lunn, Kent Agee	3:39
3.	"Practice Life" (with guest vocalist Martina McBride)	A. Griggs, Brett James	4:13
4.	"Always"	Kris Bergsnes, Jess Leary	4:15
5.	"Custom Made"	David Malloy, David Lee Murphy, A. Griggs	3:30
6.	"A Hundred Miles of Bad Road" (with Tom Keifer)	Tom Keifer, A. Griggs, Savannah Snow	3:36
7.	"How Cool Is That"	Neil Thrasher, Wendell Mobley, A. Griggs	3:12
8.	"I've Learned"	Angela Lauer, Tom Douglas	4:11
9.	"Tonight I Wanna Be Your Man"	Rivers Rutherford, Troy Verges	2:58
10.	"Sweetheart of Beinja Bayou"	Jerry Sullivan	3:46
11.	"Brand New Something Going On"	Don Cook, Jamie Hartford	3:12
12.	"Where's a Train"	Allison Mellon, A. Griggs	6:11
13.	"Someone Like Me" (hidden track)	Mason Griggs	2:56

== Personnel ==
As listed in liner notes.

- Kenny Aronoff – drums
- Ron Block – banjo
- Larry Byrom – acoustic guitar
- Charles Cushman – acoustic guitar, banjo
- Eric Darken – percussion
- Dan Dugmore – acoustic guitar, bass guitar, Dobro, electric guitar, slide guitar, steel guitar
- Stuart Duncan – fiddle, mandolin
- Andy Griggs – lead vocals, background vocals, acoustic guitar
- David Grissom – electric guitar
- Aubrey Haynie – mandolin
- Wes Hightower – background vocals
- Tom Keifer – electric guitar and background vocals on "A Hundred Miles of Bad Road"
- Michael Landau – electric guitar
- Brent Mason – acoustic guitar, electric guitar
- Martina McBride – background vocals on "Practice Life"
- David Lee Murphy – background vocals
- Jimmy Nichols – piano, keyboards, background vocals
- Melinda Norris – background vocals
- Michael Rhodes – bass guitar
- Dave Roe – upright bass
- Neil Thrasher – background vocals
- Robby Turner – steel guitar
- C. J. Udeen – steel guitar
- Kenny Vaughan – acoustic guitar, electric guitar
- Lonnie Wilson – background vocals
- Glenn Worf – bass guitar

== Chart performance ==
=== Album ===
Chart (2002)	Peak position
U.S. Billboard Top Country Albums	7
U.S. Billboard 200	77

=== Singles ===
Year	Single	Peak chart positions	
Year	Single	US Country	US
2001	"How Cool Is That"	22	119
2002	"Tonight I Wanna Be Your Man"	7	52
2002	"Practice Life" (with Martina McBride)	33	—
"—" denotes releases that did not chart
