= Tonight I Wanna Be Your Man =

Single by Andy Griggs

from the album Freedom
- B-side: "How Cool Is That"
- Released: January 21, 2002
- Genre: Country
- Length: 2:58
- Label: RCA Nashville
- Songwriters: Rivers Rutherford; Troy Verges
- Producer: David Malloy

Andy Griggs singles chronology
"How Cool Is That" (2001)	"Tonight I Wanna Be Your Man" (2002)	"Practice Life" (2002)

"Tonight I Wanna Be Your Man" is a song written by Rivers Rutherford and Troy Verges, and recorded by American country music artist Andy Griggs. It was released in January 2002 as the second single from the album Freedom. The song reached number 7 on the Billboard Hot Country Singles & Tracks chart.

== Chart performance ==
"Tonight I Wanna Your Man" debuted at number 51 on the U.S. Billboard Hot Country Single & Tracks for the week of February 2, 2002.

Chart (2002)	Peak position
US Hot Country Songs (Billboard)	7
US Billboard Hot 100	52

=== Year-end charts ===
Chart (2002)	Position
US Country Songs (Billboard)	33
