= This I Gotta See =

Studio album by Andy Griggs
- Released: August 10, 2004
- Genre: Country
- Length: 44:23
- Label: RCA Nashville
- Producer: Randy Scruggs

Andy Griggs chronology
Freedom (2002)	This I Gotta See (2004)	The Good Life (2008)

Singles from This I Gotta See
- 1. "She Thinks She Needs Me" Released: February 23, 2004; 2. "If Heaven" Released: October 11, 2004; 3. "This I Gotta See" Released: 2005; 4. "I Never Had a Chance" Released: 2005

Professional ratings
Review scores
Source	Rating
Allmusic	3/5 stars

This I Gotta See is the third studio album by American country music singer Andy Griggs. Released in 2004 as his final album for RCA Nashville, the album produced three singles: "She Thinks She Needs Me", "If Heaven" and the title track. These first two singles each reached No. 5 on the Hot Country Songs charts, while the title track reached No. 58.

Four of this album's tracks have been recorded by other country music acts. "Careful Where You Kiss Me" by Lonestar on their 2006 album Mountains, and "No Mississippi" by Gary Nichols on his self-titled debut album, which was not released. Additionally, "My Kind of Beautiful" was recorded in 2008 by the group One Flew South on their debut album Last of the Good Guys, from which it was released as a single. Jason Aldean covered the title track on his 2009 album Wide Open.

== Track listing ==
No.	Title	Writer(s)	Length
1.	"This I Gotta See"	Neil Thrasher, Tony Martin	3:46
2.	"My Kind of Beautiful"	Marcus Hummon, Darrell Scott, Andy Griggs	3:51
3.	"She Thinks She Needs Me"	Shane Minor, Sonny LeMaire, Clay Mills	4:00
4.	"Careful Where You Kiss Me"	Thrasher, Wendell Mobley, Jeff Bates	3:47
5.	"Be Still"	Thrasher, Mobley	4:00
6.	"I Never Had a Chance"	Casey Beathard, Odie Blackmon	3:44
7.	"Hillbilly Band"	Griggs, Tony Martin	2:53
8.	"Why Do I Still Want You"	Bob DiPiero, Bill Luther	5:13
9.	"Long Enough"	Chris Lindsey, Luther, Marv Green	4:18
10.	"If Heaven"	Gretchen Peters	3:32
11.	"No Mississippi" (featuring Bekka Bramlett and Delbert McClinton)	Gary Nichols, Kris Bergsnes, John Paul White	5:11

== Personnel ==
Compiled from liner notes.

Musicians

- Bekka Bramlett - background vocals on "No Mississippi"
- Dan Dugmore - steel guitar, Dobro, 12-string electric guitar
- Glen Duncan - fiddle, mandolin
- Stuart Duncan - fiddle, mandolin
- Andy Griggs - lead vocals (all tracks), background vocals (tracks 1,5)
- Wes Hightower - background vocals (track 6)
- Donny Kees - hand claps
- Delbert McClinton - background vocals on "No Mississippi"
- Wendell Mobley - background vocals (tracks 1,2,4,5,7,8,9), hand claps
- Greg Morrow - drums, percussion
- Nashville String Machine - strings
- Steve Nathan - piano, Hammond B-3 organ, synthesizer, Wurlitzer electric piano
- Michael Omartian - piano, Hammond B-3 organ
- Michael Rhodes - bass guitar
- Brent Rowan - electric guitar, slide guitar
- Randy Scruggs - acoustic guitar, National guitar, slide guitar, banjo
- Russell Terrell - background vocals (all tracks except 10), hand claps
- Neil Thrasher - background vocals (all tracks except 3 and 10), hand claps
- Biff Watson - acoustic guitar

Technical

- Richard Barrow - recording
- Steve Marcantonio - mixing
- Ron "Snake" Reynolds - recording
- Randy Scruggs - production
- Hank Williams - mastering

== Chart performance ==
=== Weekly charts ===
Chart (2004)	Peak position
US Billboard 200	59
US Top Country Albums (Billboard)	7

=== Year-end charts ===
Chart (2005)	Position
US Top Country Albums (Billboard)	72

=== Singles ===
Year	Single	Peak chart positions	
Year	Single	US Country	US
2004	"She Thinks She Needs Me"	5	43
2004	"If Heaven"	5	65
2005	"This I Gotta See"	58	—
"—" denotes releases that did not chart
