= You Won't Ever Be Lonely =

Studio album by Andy Griggs
- Released: April 13, 1999
- Recorded: 1998
- Studio: Malloy Boys Studios, Starstruck Studios, Nashville, TN
- Genre: Country
- Length: 38:40
- Label: RCA Nashville
- Producer: David Malloy, J. Gary Smith

Andy Griggs chronology
You Won't Ever Be Lonely (1999)	Freedom (2002)

Singles from You Won't Ever Be Lonely
- 1. "You Won't Ever Be Lonely" Released: November 1998; 2. "I'll Go Crazy" Released: July 12, 1999; 3. "She's More" Released: January 10, 2000; 4. "Waitin' on Sundown" Released: 2000; 5. "You Made Me That Way" Released: September 30, 2000

Professional ratings
Review scores
Source	Rating
Allmusic	2/5 stars

You Won't Ever Be Lonely is the debut studio album by American country music singer Andy Griggs, released in 1999 via RCA Nashville. Four singles were top 20 hits on the Billboard Hot Country Singles & Tracks (now Hot Country Songs) charts between 1999 and 2000: "You Won't Ever Be Lonely", "I'll Go Crazy", "She's More", and "You Made Me That Way". The album has been certified Gold by the RIAA.

Two Waylon Jennings songs are covered on this album as well: "Shine on Me" and "Ain't Livin' Long Like This", the former of which also features Jennings as a duet partner.

== Track listing ==
No.	Title	Writer(s)	Length
1.	"You Made Me That Way"	Gary Burr, David Malloy	3:13
2.	"I'll Go Crazy"	Zack Turner, Lonnie Wilson, Andy Griggs	3:03
3.	"I Miss You the Most"	Monty Criswell, Lee Thomas Miller	3:09
4.	"You Won't Ever Be Lonely"	Griggs, Brett Jones	3:26
5.	"Waitin' on Sundown"	Gary Nicholson, Russell Smith	3:48
6.	"A Side of Me"	Larry Boone, Paul Nelson, Griggs	2:46
7.	"I Don't Know a Thing"	Kelly Cole, Tim Johnson	3:36
8.	"Shine on Me" (duet with Waylon Jennings)	Beth Nielsen Chapman, Waylon Jennings	3:53
9.	"Ain't Done Nothin' Wrong"	Johnson, Griggs	3:19
10.	"She's More"	Liz Hengber, Rob Crosby	3:19
11.	"Ain't Livin' Long Like This"	Rodney Crowell	5:08

== Personnel ==
As listed in liner notes.

- Richard "Spady" Brannan – bass guitar
- Jessi Colter – background vocals
- Charlie Cushman – 5-string banjo
- Stuart Duncan – fiddle
- Larry Franklin - fiddle, mandolin
- Paul Franklin – pedal steel guitar, lap steel guitar
- Andy Griggs – lead vocals, background vocals
- Waylon Jennings – background vocals
- Jeff King – acoustic guitar, electric guitar
- Paul Leim – drums, percussion
- B. James Lowry – acoustic guitar
- Larry Marrs - background vocals
- Jerry McPherson – electric guitar
- Jimmy Nichols – piano, keyboards, background vocals
- Russ Pahl – acoustic guitar, electric guitar
- Tammy Sullivan – background vocals
- Curtis Wright – background vocals
- Curtis Young – background vocals
- Reggie Young – acoustic guitar, electric guitar

== Chart performance ==
=== Weekly charts ===
Chart (1999)	Peak position
Canadian Country Albums (RPM)	11
US Billboard 200	73
US Top Country Albums (Billboard)	15
US Heatseekers Albums (Billboard)	5

=== Year-end charts ===
Chart (1999)	Position
US Top Country Albums (Billboard)	72

=== Singles ===
Year	Single	Peak chart positions		
Year	Single	US Country	US	CAN Country
1998	"You Won't Ever Be Lonely"	2	28	11
1999	"I'll Go Crazy"	10	65	2
2000	"She's More"	2	37	2
2000	"Waitin' on Sundown"	50	—	57
2000	"You Made Me That Way"	19	116	*
"—" denotes releases that did not chart * denotes unknown peak positions

== Certifications ==
Region	Certification
United States (RIAA)	Gold
