= You Won't Ever Be Lonely (song) =

Single by Andy Griggs

from the album You Won't Ever Be Lonely
- Released: November 1998
- Genre: Country
- Length: 3:30
- Label: RCA Nashville
- Songwriters: Andy Griggs, Brett Jones
- Producers: David Malloy, J. Gary Smith

Andy Griggs singles chronology
"You Won't Ever Be Lonely" (1998)	"I'll Go Crazy" (1999)

"You Won't Ever Be Lonely" is a song co-written and recorded by American country music singer Andy Griggs. It was released in November 1998 as his debut single, and was served as the lead-off single and title track from his debut album You Won't Ever Be Lonely. It peaked at number 2 on the Billboard Hot Country Singles & Tracks charts. Griggs wrote the song with Brett Jones.

== Chart performance ==
The song debuted at number 73 on the Hot Country Singles & Tracks chart dated December 12, 1998. It charted for 36 weeks on that chart, making for the sixth-longest chart run by any country music single in the 1990s. The song reached a peak of number 2 on the chart dated May 22, 1999. In addition, it reached the Top 40 on the Billboard Hot 100, peaking at number 28 on that chart.

Chart (1998–1999)	Peak position
Canada Country Singles (RPM)	11
US Billboard Hot 100	28
US Hot Country Songs (Billboard)	2

=== Year-end charts ===
Chart (1999)	Position
Canada Country Tracks (RPM)	90
US Country Songs (Billboard)	8
