= Jim Kammerud =

American film director

- Education: Ohio State University
- Occupations: Animator, storyboard artist, screenwriter, producer, director
- Years active: 1992–present

Jim Kammerud is an American director, writer, producer and animator, best known for his work with the Walt Disney Company.

Kammerud attended the Ohio State University in the mid-1980s. There he developed his cartooning style by working as an editorial cartoonist, as well as creating the comic strip "It's Working", for The Lantern, the University's student newspaper. Also on staff at The Lantern at the time was Jeff Smith, later known for the comic book Bone.

After college, while still living in Columbus, Ohio, Kammerud and Smith formed the Character Builders animation studio. There, Kammerud began working on Rover Dangerfield and worked as an animator and storyboard artist for Bebe's Kids as well as Space Jam. He became involved with Disney as sequence director for the additional animation in Pocahontas II: Journey to a New World and later joined to direct and design the new characters in The Little Mermaid II: Return to the Sea. His next film as director was 101 Dalmatians II: Patch's London Adventure, when he also worked on part of the screenplay. His second film where he worked on the screenplay was Tarzan II, in addition to producing the film, and his most recent Disney project, The Fox and the Hound 2 is his first film without co-direction from Brian Smith. He also worked on The Aristocats II, which has since been shelved after the decision to drastically reduce the number of direct-to-video sequels made by Disney.

He has also done storyboards for many non-Disney animated films with Toronto-based animation/animatic studio House of Cool, including Gnomeo & Juliet, Ice Age: Continental Drift, Escape from Planet Earth, Epic, The Nut Job and Rio 2.

In 2009, Kammerud was featured in The Cartoonist, a documentary film on the life and work of Jeff Smith, creator of Bone.

== Filmography ==
Year	Title	Role
1992	Bebe's Kids	story artist
1994	The Swan Princess	animator
1995	A Goofy Movie	story artist
1996	Space Jam	supervising animator
1998	Pocahontas II: Journey to a New World	sequence director
2000	The Little Mermaid II: Return to the Sea	director/character designer
2003	101 Dalmatians II: Patch's London Adventure	director/story/screenplay
2005	Tarzan II	co-producer/screenplay
2006	The Fox and the Hound 2	director
2011	Gnomeo & Juliet	additional story artist
2012	Ice Age: Continental Drift	story artist
2013	Escape from Planet Earth	story artist
2013	Epic	story artist
2014	Rio 2	additional story artist
2015	The Peanuts Movie	head of story
2017	The Emoji Movie	story artist
2021	Space Jam: A New Legacy	story artist
