= Motoyoshi Tokunaga =

Japanese animation producer

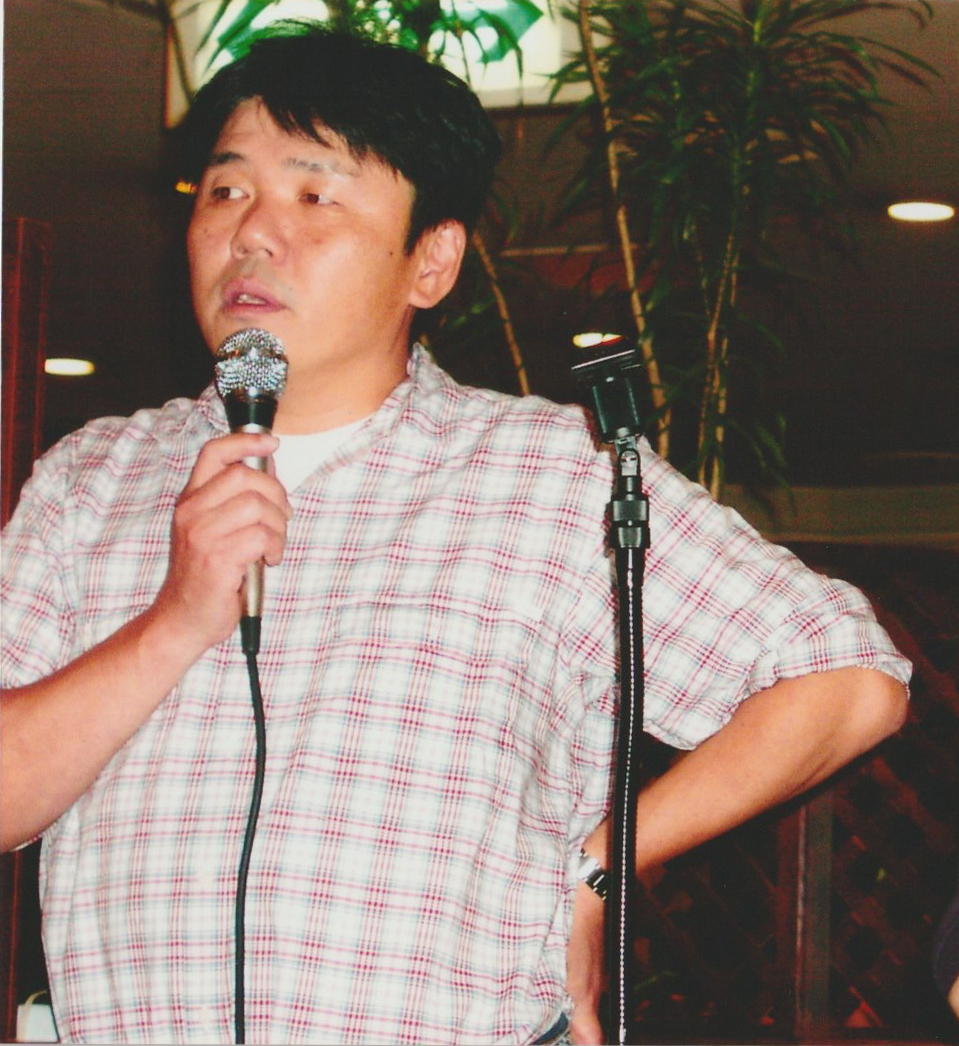
- Motoyoshi Tokunaga in 2002
- Born: Motoyoshi Tokunaga; Japan

Motoyoshi Tokunaga (Japanese: 徳永 元義) is a Japanese animation producer and studio executive best known as the founder and president of The Answer Studio, a Tokyo-based animation company established following the closure of Walt Disney Animation Japan.
