= She's More =

Single by Andy Griggs

from the album You Won't Ever Be Lonely
- B-side: "I'll Go Crazy"
- Released: January 3, 2000
- Genre: Country
- Length: 3:19
- Label: RCA Nashville
- Songwriters: Liz Hengber; Rob Crosby
- Producers: David Malloy; J. Gary Smith

Andy Griggs singles chronology
"I'll Go Crazy" (1999)	"She's More" (2000)	"Waitin' on Sundown" (2000)

"She's More" is a song written by Liz Hengber and Rob Crosby, and recorded by American country music singer Andy Griggs. It was released in January 2000 as the third single from his debut album, You Won't Ever Be Lonely. The song reached the Top 5 on the Billboard Hot Country Singles & Tracks (now Hot Country Songs) chart.

== Chart positions ==
The song debuted at number 45 on the Hot Country Singles & Tracks chart dated January 15, 2000. It charted for 30 weeks on that chart, and reached number 2 on the chart dated May 20, 2000, where it stayed for five consecutive weeks, having been blocked from Number One by Faith Hill's "The Way You Love Me", for its first four weeks, and then Chad Brock's "Yes!" the next week. It also peaked at number 37 on the Billboard Hot 100, giving Griggs his second Top 40 hit on that chart.

Chart (2000)	Peak position
Canada Country Singles (RPM)	2
US Billboard Hot 100	37
US Hot Country Songs (Billboard)	2

=== Year-end charts ===
Chart (2000)	Position
US Country Songs (Billboard)	12
