= If Heaven =

Single by Andy Griggs

from the album This I Gotta See
- Released: October 4, 2004
- Genre: Country
- Length: 3:32
- Label: RCA Nashville
- Songwriter: Gretchen Peters
- Producer: Randy Scruggs

Andy Griggs singles chronology
"She Thinks She Needs Me" (2004)	"If Heaven" (2004)	"This I Gotta See" (2005)

"If Heaven" is a song written and recorded by Gretchen Peters on her 2004 album, Halcyon. Shortly thereafter, American country music singer Andy Griggs recorded his version. Griggs' version was released in October 2004 as the second single from his album This I Gotta See. Griggs' eleventh single on the Billboard country singles charts, it is also the final Top 40 country hit of his career, peaking at number 5 in mid-2005.

== Content ==
Written by Gretchen Peters, "If Heaven" is a ballad in which the narrator offers up possible images of Heaven, each based on an idealized moment of everyday life, such as "If heaven was an hour, it would be twilight". In the chorus, he sings, "If that's what heaven's made of / You know, I ain't afraid to die."

Griggs said that he was emotionally moved by the song, which made him recall his father and brother, both of whom died during Griggs' childhood. His mother has asked him to perform the song for her, and refers to it as "the song."

== Critical reception ==
Deborah Evans Price, of Billboard magazine reviewed the song favorably, calling it "one of those beautiful, understated ballads that will have listeners heaving a thoughtful sigh." She went on to mention that Griggs' "warm, muscular baritone gently breathes life into each line, evoking emotions both sad and hopeful."

== Music video ==
The music video was directed by Roman White and premiered in 2005.

== Chart performance ==
"If Heaven" debuted at number 59 on the U.S. Billboard Hot Country Singles & Tracks for the week of October 16, 2004.

Chart (2004–2005)	Peak position
US Hot Country Songs (Billboard)	5
US Billboard Hot 100	65

=== Year-end charts ===
Chart (2005)	Position
US Country Songs (Billboard)	18
