= You Made Me That Way =

Single by Andy Griggs

from the album You Won't Ever Be Lonely
- Released: September 25, 2000
- Genre: Country
- Length: 3:13
- Label: RCA Nashville
- Songwriters: David Malloy, Gary Burr
- Producers: David Malloy, J. Gary Smith

Andy Griggs singles chronology
"Waitin' on Sundown" (2000)	"You Made Me That Way" (2000)	"How Cool Is That" (2001)

"You Made Me That Way" is a song written by David Malloy and Gary Burr, and recorded by American country music artist Andy Griggs. It was released in September 2000 as the fifth and final single from the album You Won't Ever Be Lonely. The song reached number 19 on the Billboard Hot Country Singles & Tracks chart.

== Chart performance ==
Chart (2000–2001)	Peak position
Canada Country Singles (RPM)	70 (Note: "You Made Me That Way" had not yet peaked when RPM ceased publication in November 2000.)
US Hot Country Songs (Billboard)	19
US Bubbling Under Hot 100 (Billboard)	16
