= The Good Life (Andy Griggs album) =

Studio album by Andy Griggs
- Released: February 12, 2008 (iTunes); May 27, 2008 (stores)
- Genre: Country
- Length: 46:07
- Label: Montage Music Group
- Producer: Frank J. Myers

Andy Griggs chronology
This I Gotta See (2004)	The Good Life (2008)	Naked (2013)

Singles from The Good Life
- 1. "Tattoo Rose" Released: 2007; 2. "What If It's Me" Released: 2007

Professional ratings
Review scores
Source	Rating
Allmusic	
Country Weekly	3/5 stars

The Good Life is the fourth studio album by American country music artist Andy Griggs, and his first for Montage Music Group after exiting RCA Records Nashville in 2005. It was released on February 12, 2008 to iTunes and Ruckus, while the CD was released to retail stores on May 27, 2008. "Tattoo Rose" and "What If It's Me" were both released as singles from this album, and both have charted on the Hot Country Songs charts. "Long Way Down" was also recorded by James Otto on his 2004 album Days of Our Lives.

== Track listing ==
No.	Title	Writer(s)	Length
1.	"Tattoo Rose"	Cole Deggs, John Ramey	3:18
2.	"What If It's Me"	Frank J. Myers, Jon Stone	3:22
3.	"It's All About the Money"	Jody Harris, Donny Kees	3:36
4.	"Tears and Time"	Terry Clayton, Brett James, Kevin Mason	4:04
5.	"Long Way Down"	Craig Wiseman, C. Michael Spriggs	4:51
6.	"Shadows"	C.A. Dreyer, Frank Rogers, Chris Stapleton	3:51
7.	"You Can't Drive My Cadillac"	Joe Collins, Chris Tompkins	3:30
8.	"If You Had Called Yesterday"	Cory Batten, Kent Blazy, Wendell Mobley	4:18
9.	"Long Stretch of Lonesome"	Myers, Andy Griggs, Billy Montana	3:56
10.	"New Orleans Lady"	Hoyt Garrick, Leon Medica	3:55
11.	"Burning a Hole in My Head"	Griggs, Kees, Myers, Terry McBride	3:56
12.	"Time Is a Gypsy"	Rob Crosby, Billy Thomas, Liz Hengber	3:30

== Personnel ==
- Bruce Bouton - steel guitar
- Bekka Bramlett - background vocals
- Perry Coleman - background vocals
- Chad Cromwell - drums
- Eric Darken - percussion
- Chip Davis - background vocals
- Glen Duncan - fiddle, mandolin
- Andy Griggs - lead vocals, background vocals
- Paul Leim - drums
- Brent Mason - electric guitar
- Frank J. Myers - background vocals
- Jimmy Nichols - keyboards, Hammond organ, piano
- Michael Rhodes - bass guitar
- Neil Thrasher - background vocals
- Ilya Toshinsky - banjo, acoustic guitar
- Biff Watson - acoustic guitar

== Chart performance ==
=== Singles ===
Year	Single	Peak chart positions
Year	Single	US Country
2007	"Tattoo Rose"	57
2007	"What If It's Me"	52
