= How Cool Is That =

Single by Andy Griggs

from the album Freedom
- B-side: "Tonight I Wanna Be Your Man"
- Released: May 19, 2001
- Genre: Country
- Length: 3:12
- Label: RCA Nashville
- Songwriter(s): Andy Griggs, Wendell Mobley, Neil Thrasher
- Producer(s): David Malloy

Andy Griggs singles chronology
"You Made Me That Way" (2000)	"How Cool Is That" (2001)	"Tonight I Wanna Be Your Man" (2002)

"How Cool Is That" is a song co-written and recorded by American country music artist Andy Griggs. It was released in May 2001 as the first single from the album Freedom. The song reached #22 on the Billboard Hot Country Singles & Tracks chart. The song was written by Griggs, Wendell Mobley and Neil Thrasher.

== Chart performance ==
Chart (2001)	Peak position
US Bubbling Under Hot 100 Singles (Billboard)	19
US Hot Country Songs (Billboard)	22
