= You, Fireworks, and Our Promise =

Japanese light novel

- Light novel volume cover

君と花火と約束と (Kimi to Hanabi to Yakusoku to)
- Genre: Coming of age; Romance
- Novel series
- Written by: Kaori Mado
- Published by: Note
- Original run: August 4, 2025 – October 27, 2025
- Light novel
- Written by: Kaori Mado
- Illustrated by: Akamoku
- Published by: Shogakukan
- Imprint: Gagaga Bunko
- Published: December 18, 2025
- Volumes: 1
- Manga

Kimi to Hanabi to Yakusoku to @comic
- Written by: Kaori Mado
- Illustrated by: Yomiya Ririura
- Published by: Shogakukan
- Imprint: Sunday Webry Comics
- Magazine: Sunday Webry
- Original run: March 26, 2026 – present
- Volumes: 1
- Anime film
- Directed by: Kei Suzuki
- Written by: Kōhei Mori
- Music by: Arisa Okehazama
- Studio: SynergySP (animation); The Answer Studio (animation); Shin-Ei Animation (production and planning)
- Released: July 17, 2026
- Runtime: 96 minutes
- icon

You, Fireworks, and Our Promise (Japanese: 君と花火と約束と, Hepburn: Kimi to Hanabi to Yakusoku to) is a Japanese light novel written by Kaori Mado and illustrated by Akamoku. The novel was originally serialized online on the Note website from August 4 to October 27, 2025. It was later acquired by Shogakukan, who released it in print under its Gagaga Bunko imprint on December 18 of the same year. A manga adaptation illustrated by Yomiya Ririura began serialization on Shogakukan's Sunday Webry service in March 2026 and has been compiled into a single tankōbon volume as of July 2026. An anime film adaptation produced by Shin-Ei Animation and animated by SynergySP and The Answer Studio premiered in Japan in July 2026.

== Plot ==
Makoto Natsume, a first-year junior high school student in Chōfu, Tokyo, is suddenly confessed to by a fellow freshman named Aki Hayama. Aki told him that her grandmother once told her about meeting a boy named Makoto Natsume in the future. Having never met before, Makoto is convinced that Aki is mistaken. When Aki brings up a painting of a fireworks, Makoto decides to help her find the Makoto Natsume she is looking for. The following year, the two head to Nagaoka, Niigata, to attend the city's famed fireworks festival, suspecting that the painting is linked to it.

== Characters ==
Makoto Natsume (夏目誠, Natsume Makoto)
Voiced by: Shori Sato (Timelesz)
Aki Hayama (葉山煌, Hayama Aki)
Voiced by: Nanoka Hara
Haru (ハル)
Voiced by: Rie Takahashi
Yukari Natsume (夏目由香利, Natsume Yukari)
Voiced by: Natsuko Yokosawa

== Media ==
=== Light novel ===
No.	Release date	ISBN
1	December 18, 2025	978-4-09-453260-9

=== Manga ===
A manga adaptation illustrated by Yomiya Ririura began serialization on Shogakukan's Sunday Webry service on March 26, 2026. The first tankōbon volume was released on July 10, 2026.

No.	Release date	ISBN
1	July 10, 2026	978-4-09-854689-3

=== Anime film ===
An anime film adaptation was announced on January 25, 2026. Produced and planned by Shin-Ei Animation, the film is animated by SynergySP and The Answer Studio and directed by Kei Suzuki, from a screenplay written by Kōhei Mori, characters designed by Yūji Watanabe, and music composed by Arisa Okehazama. It was released in Japan by Shochiku and Shin-Ei Animation on July 17, 2026. The theme song is "Kienai Hanabi" (消えない花火; 'Eternal Fireworks') performed by Timelesz.

== Reception ==
Writing for Bookstand, Yayoi Saginomiya praised the novel, stating that while the novel had a light-hearted feel typical of light novels, it also leaves the reader deep feelings, given the connection between the Nagaoka Fireworks Festival and World War II. The novel was included in a list by Real Sound of the best upcoming light novels to be released in December 2025.

The anime film adaptation received poor reviews. A two-star review in The Japan Times described it as a low-rent version of Your Name.
