= Natsuko Yokosawa =

Japanese actress (born 1990)

- 横澤 夏子
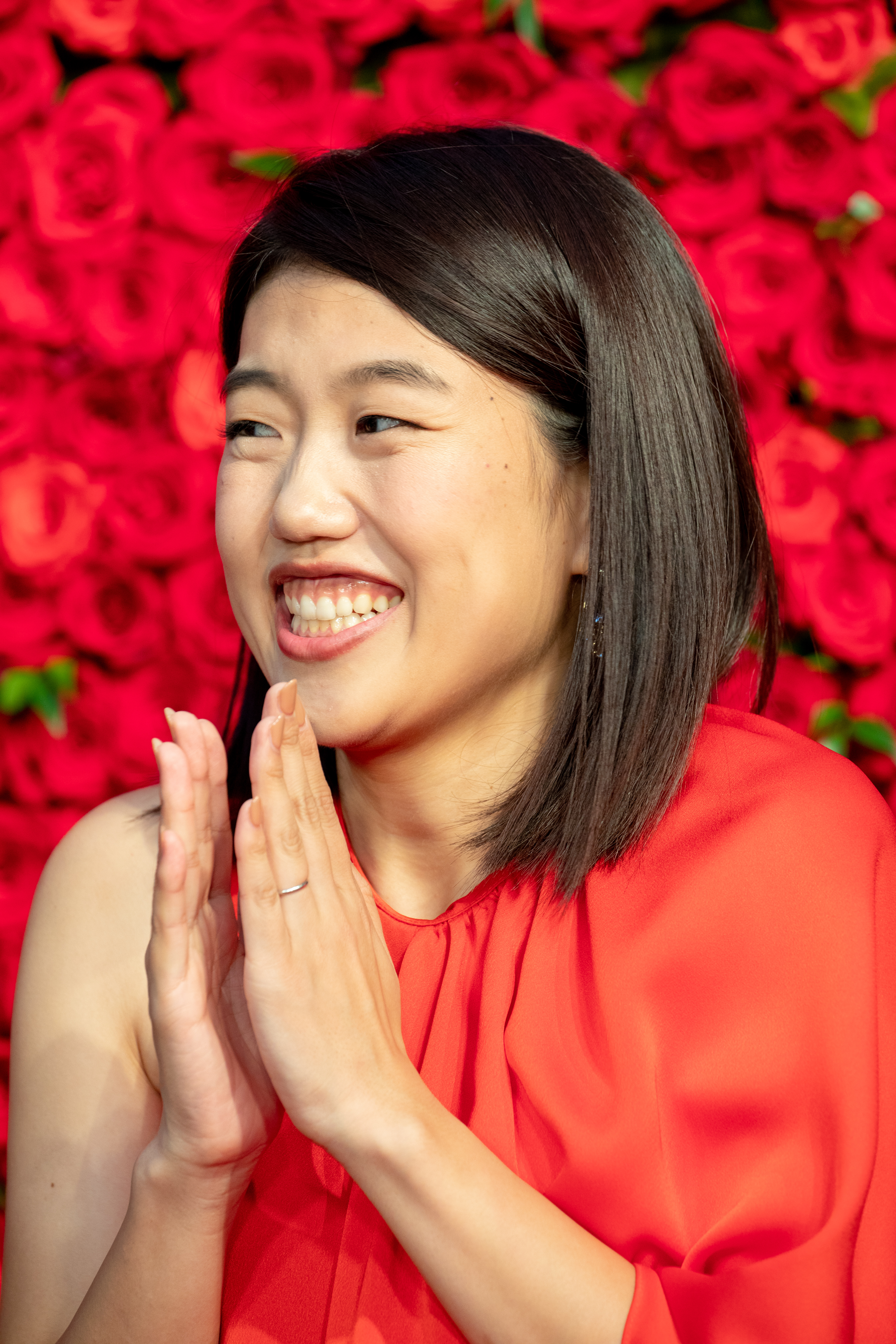
- Yokozawa at Opening Ceremony of the Tokyo International Film Festival 2018.
- Born: 20 July 1990 (age 36); Itoigawa, Niigata, Japan
- Other names: Nat-chan (なっちゃん); Yokonatsu (よこなつ)
- Education: Tokyo NSC
- Occupations: Actress; comedian
- Years active: 2009–present
- Agent: Yoshimoto Creative Agency
- Known for: Power Purin
- Height: 169.6 cm (5 ft 7 in)
- Children: 3

Natsuko Yokosawa (横澤 夏子, Yokosawa Natsuko; born 20 July 1990) is a Japanese actress and comedian from Itoigawa, Niigata.

She is represented with Yoshimoto Creative Agency in Tokyo from Yoshimoto Kogyo. She graduated from NSC in Tokyo. She is equally synchronised with comedy duos Matenrō and Dennis.

== Filmography ==
=== Films ===
Year	Title	Role	Notes	Ref.
2022	Break of Dawn	Mifuyu Kishi (voice)		
2023	Adulthood Friends	Michiko Meguro		
2026	You, Fireworks, and Our Promise	Yukari Natsume (voice)		

=== TV drama ===
Year	Title	Role	Notes	Ref.
2016	Seisei Suru Hodo, Aishiteru	Kasumi Saeki		
2026	The Scent of the Wind	Tetsu Hada	Asadora	

=== Advertisements ===
Year	Title	Notes	Ref.
2016	NTT DoCoMo	Internet advert	
2016	Kanebo Cosmetics Evita Beauty Whip Soap	Internet advert	
