= She Thinks She Needs Me =

Single by Andy Griggs

from the album This I Gotta See
- Released: February 23, 2004
- Genre: Country
- Length: 4:00
- Label: RCA Nashville
- Songwriters: Shane Minor; Sonny LeMaire; Clay Mills
- Producer: Randy Scruggs

Andy Griggs singles chronology
"Practice Life" (2002)	"She Thinks She Needs Me" (2004)	"If Heaven" (2004)

"She Thinks She Needs Me" is a song written by Shane Minor, Sonny LeMaire and Clay Mills, and recorded by American country music artist Andy Griggs. It was released in February 2004 as the lead-off single from his album This I Gotta See. It peaked at No. 5 on the Billboard Hot Country Singles & Tracks chart.

== Chart performance ==
The song debuted at number 60 on the Hot Country Songs chart dated February 28, 2004. Having charted for 33 weeks on that chart, it peaked at number 5 on the country chart dated September 11, 2004. It also peaked at number 43 on the Billboard Hot 100.

Chart (2004)	Peak position
US Hot Country Songs (Billboard)	5
US Billboard Hot 100	43

=== Year-end charts ===
Chart (2004)	Position
US Country Songs (Billboard)	20
