= 101 Dalmatians II: Patch's London Adventure =

2003 American animated direct-to-video musical adventure comedy drama film

- Home video release poster
- Directed by: Jim Kammerud; Brian Smith
- Screenplay by: Jim Kammerud; Brian Smith
- Story by: Jim Kammerud; Dan Root; Garrett K. Schiff; Brian Smith; Temple Mathews
- Produced by: Carolyn Bates; Leslie Hough
- Starring: Bobby Lockwood; Barry Bostwick; Samuel West; Kath Soucie; Susanne Blakeslee; Jeff Bennett; Maurice LaMarche; Jason Alexander; Martin Short
- Edited by: Robert S. Bichard; Ron Price
- Music by: Richard Gibbs
- Production company: Walt Disney Television Animation
- Distributed by: Buena Vista Home Entertainment (Note: Distributed through the Walt Disney Pictures banner.)
- Release date: January 21, 2003
- Running time: 74 minutes
- Country: United States
- Language: English

101 Dalmatians II: Patch's London Adventure is a 2003 American animated direct-to-video adventure comedy film produced by Walt Disney Television Animation with distribution by Walt Disney Home Entertainment. It serves as the sequel to Disney's 1961 animated feature film One Hundred and One Dalmatians. It was directed by Jim Kammerud and Brian Smith, with them also writing the screenplay from a story by Kammerud, Dan Root, Garrett K. Schiff, Smith and Temple Mathews. The film was produced by Carolyn Bates and Leslie Hough. It was released on VHS and DVD by Buena Vista Home Entertainment on January 21, 2003, and features the voices of Bobby Lockwood, Barry Bostwick, Martin Short, Jason Alexander, Susanne Blakeslee, Kath Soucie, Jeff Bennett, and Jim Cummings. The main focus of the sequel is Patch, the loneliest of puppies, feeling "lost in a sea of spots". After he gets left behind during the Radcliffe family's moving day, he encounters his TV hero, Thunderbolt, who enlists him on a publicity campaign. The film received generally positive reviews from critics.

== Plot ==
Sometime after the events of the first film, the Radcliffe family and their 101 Dalmatians are preparing to move to their "Dalmatian Plantation", a home in the countryside with plenty of room for all of them. However, one of the puppies, Patch, feels ignored and wishes to be unique like his television hero, Thunderbolt (portrayed by a German Shepherd actor). While watching The Thunderbolt Adventure Hour, Patch hears about a chance to appear on the show. Patch is accidentally left behind when his family leaves for the plantation, but lucky for him, this is his chance to head for the audition to meet his hero and win a guest spot on the show, but fails to impress the producers. Meanwhile, Lil' Lightning, who portrays Thunderbolt's sidekick, is mistreated and underappreciated and tricks Thunderbolt into believing that he would be replaced and convinces him to go make "real-life heroic deeds" so he would trick the producers into making himself the hero of his own show. Seeing how much Patch knows about his adventures, Thunderbolt decides to ask him for help.

Elsewhere in London, Cruella de Vil, unable to purchase furs due to being on probation and a restraining order after being exposed and arrested for stealing the Radcliffes' original 15 puppies, attempts to soothe her fixation on spots with the help of Lars, a French beatnik artist. In order to inspire him, she restarts her hunt for the Dalmatians, using a newspaper picture of Patch to find their new address. Patch's family finally becomes aware that he is missing and returns to London to search for him. Cruella bails her former henchmen, Horace and Jasper Badun, out of prison. She sends them in a stolen dog food truck to steal the remaining puppies. The Baduns succeed after dealing with Nanny, and they take the puppies to Lars. When Cruella requests she be made a masterpiece from the puppies' fur, Lars refuses, not wanting to harm the puppies. Enraged, Cruella has him bound and gagged and returns to her original evil plan of making a Dalmatian fur coat.

The imprisoned puppies use the Twilight Bark to send a distress signal, which is picked up by Patch and Thunderbolt, and they set out to save Patch's family. Lil' Lightning follows them and convinces Thunderbolt not to use Patch's stealth plan, but to openly attack. Cruella knocks Thunderbolt unconscious and has the Baduns lock Patch and Thunderbolt in a cage. Lil' Lightning then tells Patch that Thunderbolt is just an actor and he betrays them. Patch falls into despair, but Lucky reminds him that Thunderbolt escaped a similar predicament in one of the TV episodes. Patch breaks out and releases his siblings, but Thunderbolt remains behind, ashamed of himself for disappointing Patch. The Dalmatians escape through the building's roof to a double-decker bus. Meanwhile, Thunderbolt escapes from his cage and frees Lars.

Cruella and the Baduns discover the escape, and a chase ensues through the streets of London, crashing through the filming of Lil' Lightning's new show in the process. Cruella and the Baduns finally corner the puppies in an alley. Patch tries to hold them off while the others escape, but they are undaunted. Luckily, Thunderbolt arrives, having been driven to the scene by Lars, and fakes a heart attack, distracting Cruella and causing her to knock out Jasper and Horace and incapacitate herself. Patch puts the bus into reverse, sending Cruella, the Baduns, their stolen truck, and Lil' Lightning scrambling into the River Thames. The police arrest the Baduns and Lil' Lightning, while Cruella, now deemed completely insane, is sent to a psychiatric hospital. The Radcliffes and Nanny arrive along with Patch's parents, Pongo and Perdita, who thank Thunderbolt. Thunderbolt dismisses himself as just an actor, but says that Patch is "a real, one-of-a-kind wonder-dog".

In a post-credits scene, Patch, along with his 98 siblings, finally fulfills his dream to star in another episode of The Thunderbolt Adventure Hour.

== Voice cast ==
- Bobby Lockwood as Patch, one of the 101 Dalmatian puppies. He has a large black spot over one of his eyes, hence his name. He feels disillusioned and unappreciated by his family, thinking that he is just one of the famous 101 Dalmatians, and longs for a chance to become independent and escape from the nepotism he is associated with. He is plucky, honest, and head-strong. He quickly befriends Thunderbolt, the famous television wonder-dog whom he adores, and later meets Lil' Lightning, the famous sidekick of Thunderbolt (only to be betrayed by him later on).
- Barry Bostwick as Thunderbolt, a German Shepherd and the star of The Thunderbolt Adventure Hour. As the film opens, it is shown that Thunderbolt is self-absorbed and treats his sidekick, Lil' Lightning, very coldly. When Thunderbolt runs away, after being tricked by Lightning into thinking that the director of his famous show plans to kill him off, he runs into Patch, and the two quickly bond, trying to do good deeds to prove that Thunderbolt is a real hero. As the film progresses, Thunderbolt becomes a father figure to Patch, and loses his selfish, pampered attitude to become a heroic, adventurous, and well-meaning dog.
- Susanne Blakeslee as Cruella de Vil, the main villain of the film. Betty Lou Gerson previously voiced Cruella in the 1961 original, and Mary Wickes provided the live-action model. Cruella is now under a restraining order due to her past history of crimes of trying to kidnap and kill the Dalmatian puppies. To help cure her obsession for fur, she meets Lars and has him do a Dalmatian masterpiece for her, but he refuses once she reveals she wants him to use the puppies' coats as canvases. This makes her revolt and go back to her original plan of kidnapping the dogs for a coat. In the end, she is defeated and sent to a psychiatric hospital.
- Jason Alexander as Lil' Lightning, a Pembroke Welsh Corgi and the sidekick of Thunderbolt's famous show. Initially, Thunderbolt considers Lightning his best friend, despite treating him coldly. Eventually, Lightning grows fed up with always standing in Thunderbolt's shadow and putting up with his negligence and mistreatment. To retaliate, Lightning tricks Thunderbolt into running away, then plots to trick the director into re-writing the show slanted towards Lightning. When Thunderbolt and Patch return, endangering Lightning's chance at fame, he reveals himself to be a traitor and has the two dogs locked away. In the end, however, he is overpowered and then taken away to the dog pound by two police dogs.
- Martin Short as Lars, a stylish, but eccentric, French artist who enjoys little more than painting spots. One of his traits is his tendency to not use many contractions. It is suggested he had romantic feelings towards Cruella, but when she captures the Dalmatian puppies again and plans to break her rules of goodness and make coats out of them, he realizes her true intentions and rebels, only to be bound and gagged by Cruella herself. In the end, he is freed by Thunderbolt and assists in defending Patch from Cruella, Jasper, and Horace.
- Samuel West as Pongo, father of the 15 Dalmatian puppies (and adopted father of the other 84). He is caring but distant, causing Patch to feel lonely and just one of one hundred and one, instead of his own personality.
- Kath Soucie as Perdita, mother of the 15 Dalmatian puppies (and adopted mother of the other 84). She is a doting, kind-hearted dog who only wants the best for her children (and adopted children), and is distraught to find her children missing once again.
- Tim Bentinck as Roger Radcliffe, Pongo's original owner, Anita's husband and songwriter. On the radio of Cruella's car, the archived singing voice of Roger by Bill Lee performing the Cruella de Vil song from the original film is heard.
- Jodi Benson as Anita Radcliffe, Roger's wife and Perdita's original owner.
- Jeff Bennett and Maurice LaMarche as Jasper and Horace Badun, Cruella's inept henchmen and the secondary villains. J. Pat O'Malley and Fred Worlock had voiced the Baduns in the 1961 original. They are in prison when the film starts, but are bailed out by Cruella, who rehires them to finish the job of killing and skinning the Dalmatian puppies, though they doubt her as they do not want to be made fools of again. She later has them capture the puppies in cages and bring them to Lars so he can use them as canvases for a masterpiece. In the end, Jasper and Horace are arrested again. However, they clean up their act after this second arrest, opening a shop in London instead of continuing their past occupation as criminals.
- Mary MacLeod as Nanny, the Radcliffe family's maid, who battles the Badduns when they attempt to steal the puppies a second time.
- Ben Tibber as Lucky, one of Patch's brothers.
- Eli Russell Linnetz as Rolly, one of Patch's brothers, an overweight food lover.
- Kasha Kropinski as Penny, one of Patch's sisters.
- Tara Strong as Two-Tone, one of Patch's sisters.
- Michael Lerner as Producer
- Jim Cummings as Dirty Dawson, the villain of The Thunderbolt Adventure Hour.
- Frank Welker as Additional Animals' Vocal Effects and Additional Voices.
- Ulsla Brooks as Dixie.
- Kathryn Beaumont as Crystal.
- Rob Paulsen as Additional Animals' Vocal Effects and Additional Voices.

== Release ==
101 Dalmatians II: Patch's London Adventure was released direct-to-video on January 21, 2003, 42 years after its predecessor. Bonus features on the DVD include the behind-the-scenes footage "Making of Dog-umentary", music videos "Try Again" by Will Young and "You're the One" by LMNT, and some games. The film was re-released on DVD on September 16, 2008. It was released on Blu-ray on September 3, 2012 in the United Kingdom, along with the UK Blu-ray release of the original film. Finally, the film was released on Blu-ray on June 9, 2015, in the United States, following the first HD Blu-ray release of its predecessor.

== Reception ==
On the review aggregator website Rotten Tomatoes, it currently holds a 67% rating based on 6 reviews, with an average rating of 5/10.

Almar Haflidason of BBC.com gave the film 3 out of 5, calling it the "best Disney direct-to-video sequel so far".

== Soundtrack ==
All tracks are written by Richard Gibbs.

No.	Title	Performer(s)	Length
1.	"I See Spots"	Tim Bentinck
2.	"Dalmatian Plantation"	Tim Bentinck
3.	"The Thunderbolt Adventure Hour"	Chorus
4.	"Kanine Krunchies"	Lucille Bliss
5.	"Cruella de Vil"	Bill Lee
6.	"Try Again"	Will Young

== Video game ==
A video game based on the film was released exclusively on PlayStation on November 20, 2003.
