= Kazuyoshi Takeuchi =

Japanese animator

- Kazuyoshi Takeuchi in Tokyo, September 2026
- Born: Japan
- Occupations: Animator, author
- Notable work: City Hunter: Angel Dust

Kazuyoshi Takeuchi is a Japanese Animator with over 75 anime credits including Akira (1988). In 1995 he was nominated for an Annie Award for Best Individual Achievement for Production Design in the Field of Animation
