= I'll Go Crazy (Andy Griggs song) =

Single by Andy Griggs

from the album You Won't Ever Be Lonely
- B-side: "She's More"
- Released: July 12, 1999
- Genre: Country
- Length: 3:03
- Label: RCA Nashville
- Songwriters: Andy Griggs, Zack Turner, Lonnie Wilson
- Producers: David Malloy, J. Gary Smith

Andy Griggs singles chronology
"You Won't Ever Be Lonely" (1998)	"I'll Go Crazy" (1999)	"She's More" (2000)

"I'll Go Crazy" is a song co-written and recorded by American country music artist Andy Griggs. It was released in July 1999 as the second single from the album You Won't Ever Be Lonely. The song reached number 10 on the Billboard Hot Country Singles & Tracks chart. Griggs wrote this song with Zack Turner and Lonnie Wilson.

== Chart performance ==
"I'll Go Crazy" debuted at number 60 on the U.S. Billboard Hot Country Singles & Tracks for the week of July 17, 1999.

Chart (1999)	Peak position
Canada Country Singles (RPM)	2
US Billboard Hot 100	65
US Hot Country Songs (Billboard)	10

=== Year-end charts ===
Chart (1999)	Position
Canada Country Tracks (RPM)	57
US Country Songs (Billboard)	52
