= The Fox and the Hound 2 =

2006 animated film by Jim Kammerud

- DVD cover
- Directed by: Jim Kammerud
- Screenplay by: Rich Burns; Roger S.H. Schulman
- Produced by: Ferrell Barron
- Starring: Reba McEntire; Patrick Swayze; Jonah Bobo; Harrison Fahn; Jeff Foxworthy; Vicki Lawrence; Stephen Root
- Edited by: Jennifer Dolce; Ron Price
- Music by: Joel McNeely
- Production company: Disneytoon Studios (Note: Animation outsourced to Toon City Animation.)
- Distributed by: Buena Vista Home Entertainment (Note: Distributed by Walt Disney Home Entertainment through the Walt Disney Pictures banner.)
- Release date: December 12, 2006
- Running time: 69 minutes
- Country: United States
- Language: English

The Fox and the Hound 2 is a 2006 American animated direct-to-video buddy adventure film produced by Walt Disney Pictures and Disneytoon Studios, and an intermediate follow-up to the 1981 Walt Disney Animation Studios film The Fox and the Hound. The film takes place during the youth of Tod and Copper, before the events of the later half of the first film. The plot of The Fox and the Hound 2 involves Copper being tempted to join a band of singing stray dogs called "The Singin' Strays", thus threatening his friendship with Tod.

The film was directed by Jim Kammerud and features the voices of Reba McEntire and Patrick Swayze (in his only voice role). The film had an official soundtrack album released on November 21, 2006. The film was released by Walt Disney Home Entertainment on December 12, 2006 and received generally negative reviews, with critics calling it a pale imitation of its predecessor.

== Plot ==
The film opens with Tod and Copper chasing a cricket together. They see a line of trucks bringing the county fair to town, and Copper is mesmerized by the sound of dogs singing together in an old school bus with "The Singin' Strays" painted on the side. The pair are eager to go see the fair, but when Copper's clumsy tracking disappoints his master Amos Slade yet again, the pup is tied up in the yard while Slade and Chief go to the fair without him. Tod arrives and pulls Copper's collar off, and the pair head to the fair.

Tod and Copper get to meet The Singin' Strays. The band has five members: Dixie (a Saluki), Cash (a Spanish Hound), Granny Rose, and twin brothers Waylon and Floyd (Bloodhounds). It is important that they perform well because a talent scout from the Grand Ole Opry will be at the fair. Cash and Dixie get into an argument, and Dixie walks off before their performance, forcing them to go on stage without her. During the show, Copper sings along, and Cash invites the pup up on stage to sing with them. The musical number is a success. Cash invites Copper to join the band, and he does so after Tod lies that Copper is a stray. Copper spends the entire day with Cash, forgetting his promise to watch fireworks with Tod.

Dixie finds Tod and sympathizes with his feelings of abandonment. During their conversation, Tod lets it slip that Copper is not a stray. Dixie then hatches a plan to get Copper kicked out of the band. Tod sneaks into Chief's barrel, luring him and Slade to the fair in a wild chase. The chase leads to widespread mayhem in the fair, and the Singin' Strays' performance is sabotaged right in front of the talent scout Mr. Bickerstaff. Copper is fired from the band and returns home with Slade. Granny Rose and the rest of the members of Cash's band feel quite sorry for Copper, and the band breaks up, prompting Cash to lambast Dixie for the impact of her actions. Copper ends his friendship with Tod for ruining everything. Tod is brought home by his owner, Widow Tweed. Along the way, Tweed narrowly avoids being hit by the talent scout's car, and Bickerstaff's hat flies off his head and lands on Tod.

The following day, Dixie admits to Copper that blowing Copper's cover was her idea, not Tod's and they reconcile. Hoping to atone for his doings, Tod gives Bickerstaff's hat to Copper, who uses it to track down the talent scout at a local diner. Tod tricks Cash and Dixie into thinking the other is in trouble, and the entire band end up meeting up at the diner. Copper convinces the band of the importance of harmony, and The Singin' Strays howl a reprise of their song We're in Harmony, attracting the attention of the talent scout and reuniting the band. Impressed with the band, he arranges for the dogs to perform at the Grand Ole Opry. The film ends with Copper choosing to leave the band and play with Tod again.

== Voice cast ==
- Jonah Bobo as Tod
- Harrison Fahn as Copper
- Patrick Swayze as Cash
- Reba McEntire as Dixie
- Jeff Foxworthy as Lyle
- Vicki Lawrence as Granny Rose
- Stephen Root as Winchell P. Bickerstaff, the Talent Scout
- Jim Cummings as Waylon and Floyd
- Rob Paulsen as Chief
- Russi Taylor as Widow Tweed
- Jeff Bennett as Amos Slade
- Kath Soucie as Zelda the cat
- Hannah Farr as Olivia Farmer

== Reception ==
Kevin Carr of 7M Pictures gave the film two stars out of five, saying "The Fox and the Hound 2 is never going to live down as a classic, but it isn't terrible. It falls somewhere in the middle of the Disney DVD sequel spectrum." Joe Leydon of Variety gave a positive review, noting the sequel is "brighter and lighter" than its predecessor in that it "emphasizes slapstick and tomfoolery, not life lessons and consciousness-raising".

The review aggregator website Rotten Tomatoes reported that the film received a 20% approval rating with an average rating of 4.6/10 based on 10 reviews.

== Soundtrack ==
The Fox and the Hound 2 Soundtrack Album

Soundtrack album by Various artists
- Released: November 21, 2006
- Recorded: 2005–2006
- Label: Walt Disney Records

Professional ratings
Review scores
Source	Rating
Allmusic	3.5/5 stars

The Fox and the Hound 2 Soundtrack Album is the soundtrack album to the film, containing songs from Reba McEntire, who was the voice of Dixie in the film, as well as other well-known artists such as Trisha Yearwood, Chip Davis, and Little Big Town. Composer Joel McNeely has a few score tracks on the album: "Depressed Dixie", "Sad Puppy Blues", "Nashville 7", and "Sticky Hound Puppy". The Fox and the Hound 2 Soundtrack Album features a combination of country and bluegrass writers and performers were found in Nashville by Disney according to the music supervisor Kimberly Oliver, and Matt Walker, Senior VP, DisneyToon Studios. Background music score composer Joel McNeely composed bluegrass music for setting the moods of scenes, performed by several famous bluegrass performers.

=== Track listing ===
No.	Title	Writer(s)	Performer(s)	Length
1.	"Friends for Life"	Marcus Hummon	One Flew South	4:00
2.	"Nashville 7"	Joel McNeely and Mike Marshall		1:41
3.	"We're in Harmony"	Will Robinson	Chip Davis	1:29
4.	"Hound Dude"	Will Robinson	Josh Gracin	2:17
5.	"Depressed Dixie"	Joel McNeely		1:28
6.	"Good Doggy, No Bone!"	Marcus Hummon	Reba McEntire	3:13
7.	"Sticky Hound Puppy"	Joel McNeely		2:48
8.	"Blue Beyond"	Gordon Kennedy and Blair Masters	Trisha Yearwood	3:08
9.	"We Go Together"	Marcus Hummon	Little Big Town with The Singin' Strays	3:09
10.	"You Know I Will"	Gordon Kennedy	Lucas Grabeel	3:21
11.	"Sad Puppy"	Joel McNeely		2:16
12.	"We're in Harmony (Finale)"	Will Robinson	The Singin' Strays with Copper	1:53

== See also ==
- Foxes in popular culture
