= Andy Griggs =

American country music artist

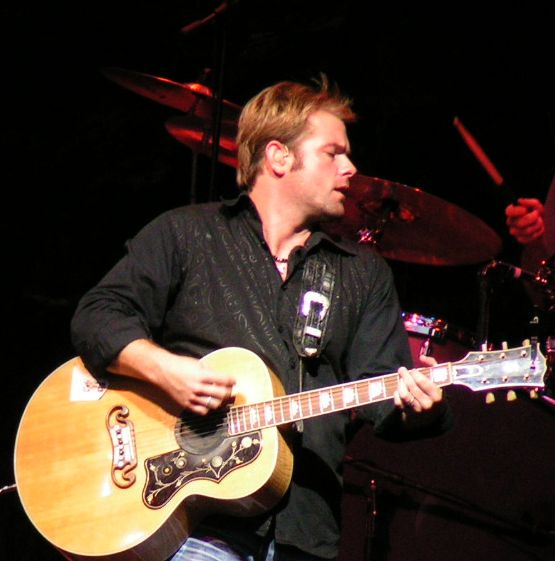
- Griggs in 2005

Background information
- Born: Andrew Tyler Griggs; August 13, 1973 (age 52)
- Origin: West Monroe, Louisiana, United States
- Genres: Country
- Occupations: Singer, songwriter
- Instruments: Vocals, guitar
- Years active: 1997–present
- Labels: RCA Nashville; Montage Music Group; Little Hannel
- Website: www.andygriggs.com

Andrew Tyler Griggs (born August 13, 1973) is an American country music artist. He has released three albums for RCA Records Nashville (You Won't Ever Be Lonely, Freedom, and This I Gotta See) and a fourth (The Good Life) for Montage Music Group. These four albums have accounted for 13 singles and 6 Top Tens on the Billboard country chart, the highest being "You Won't Ever Be Lonely" and "She's More", both of which peaked at #2. He also charted "Grow Young With You", a cut from the soundtrack to the film Where the Heart Is.

== Early life ==
Andrew Tyler Griggs was born in West Monroe, Louisiana. His father, Darrell, died when Griggs was 10, and brother Mason served as the family's father figure until he died of a heart attack at age 22.

He briefly attended Northeast Louisiana University before returning to his hometown in the early 1990s, where he became a youth minister and began a family with his wife. He continued to work on his musical skills, however, and by 1999, he signed to a contract with RCA Records Nashville.

== Musical career ==
Griggs' debut album, You Won't Ever Be Lonely, was issued in 1999 via RCA Records Nashville. Certified gold by the RIAA, the album accounted for five singles on the Billboard country singles charts. The first three singles — the title track, "I'll Go Crazy" and "She's More" — were all Top Ten hits, peaking at number 2, number 10 and number 2 respectively. "You Won't Ever Be Lonely" also had the sixth-longest chart run on the country charts in the 1990s decade, spending thirty-six weeks on the charts. Following "She's More" was a non-album song, "Grow Young With Me", recorded as a duet with Coley McCabe, and after that, "Waitin' on Sundown" at number 50 and "You Made Me That Way" at number 19. Also included on the album was a duet with Griggs' idol Waylon Jennings in the track "Shine On Me", as well as a cover of Jennings' "Ain't Livin' Long Like This".

He released his second album, Freedom, in 2002. Although its lead-off single "How Cool Is That" peaked at number 22, the second single, "Tonight I Wanna Be Your Man", became his fourth Top Ten hit at number 7. Closing out this album was "Practice Life", a number 33 duet with Martina McBride.

For 2003 and half of 2004, Griggs was absent from the country charts, although he, Montgomery Gentry, and Blake Shelton performed uncredited guest vocals on Tracy Byrd's 2003 single "The Truth About Men". Mid-2004 saw the release of "She Thinks She Needs Me". Co-written by Shane Minor, this song was the first single release from Griggs' third album, This I Gotta See, also released in 2004. Although this song and follow-up "If Heaven" were both number 5 hits on the country charts, the album's third single, "This I Gotta See", stopped at number 58, and the fourth single ("I Never Had a Chance") failed to chart at all. By 2005, he had left RCA's roster, due to creative differences over his artistic control.

In 2007, Griggs signed to his second recording contract, this time with Montage Music Group. His first album for the label, The Good Life, produced two low-charting singles in "Tattoo Rose" (co-written by Cole Deggs, lead singer of Cole Deggs & the Lonesome) and "What If It's Me". Three years later, he issued "Can I Get an Amen".

== Personal life ==
Griggs has been married twice, first to Stephanie Sullivan in February 1995, but they were eventually separated. In 2005 Griggs married Renee, but they also eventually separated. He now has a son named Mason.

== Discography ==
=== Studio albums ===
Title	Album details	Peak chart positions		Certifications (sales thresholds)
Title	Album details	US Country	US	Certifications (sales thresholds)
You Won't Ever Be Lonely (Note: You Won't Ever Be Lonely also peaked at number 5 on the Billboard Top Heatseekers chart and number 11 on the RPM Country Albums chart in Canada.)	Release date: April 13, 1999; Label: RCA Nashville	15	73	US: Gold
Freedom	Release date: May 28, 2002; Label: RCA Nashville	7	77	
This I Gotta See	Release date: August 10, 2004; Label: RCA Nashville	7	59	
The Good Life	Release date: February 12, 2008; Label: Montage Music Group	—	—	
Naked	Release date: February 26, 2013; Label: Little Hannel Records	—	—	
"—" denotes releases that did not chart

=== Singles ===
Year	Single	Peak chart positions			Album
Year	Single	US Country	US	CAN Country	Album
1998	"You Won't Ever Be Lonely"	2	28	11	You Won't Ever Be Lonely
1999	"I'll Go Crazy"	10	65	2	You Won't Ever Be Lonely
2000	"She's More"	2	37	2	You Won't Ever Be Lonely
2000	"Waitin' on Sundown"	50	—	57	You Won't Ever Be Lonely
2000	"You Made Me That Way"	19	— (Note: "You Made Me That Way" did not enter the Hot 100, but peaked at number 16 on Bubbling Under Hot 100 Singles, which acts as a 25-song extension of the Hot 100.)	—	You Won't Ever Be Lonely
2001	"How Cool Is That"	22	— (Note: "How Cool Is That" did not enter the Hot 100, but peaked at number 19 on Bubbling Under Hot 100 Singles, which acts as a 25-song extension of the Hot 100.)	—	Freedom
2002	"Tonight I Wanna Be Your Man"	7	52	—	Freedom
2002	"Practice Life" (with Martina McBride)	33	—	—	Freedom
2004	"She Thinks She Needs Me"	5	43	—	This I Gotta See
2004	"If Heaven"	5	65	—	This I Gotta See
2005	"This I Gotta See"	58	—	—	This I Gotta See
2007	"Tattoo Rose"	57	—	—	The Good Life
2007	"What If It's Me"	52	—	—	The Good Life
2009	"Cutthroat, Montana"	—	—	—	—N/a
2010	"Can I Get an Amen"	—	—	—	—N/a
2013	"Don't Let Go"	—	—	—	—N/a
2013	"20 Little Angels"	—	—	—	—N/a
"—" denotes releases that did not chart * denotes unknown peak positions

=== Guest singles ===
Year	Single	Artist	Peak positions	Album
Year	Single	Artist	US Country	Album
2000	"Grow Young with You"	Coley McCabe	50	Where the Heart Is (soundtrack)

=== Music videos ===
Year	Video	Director
1999	"You Won't Ever Be Lonely"	Brent Hedgecock
1999	"She's More"	Brent Hedgecock
2000	"Grow Young with You" (with Coley McCabe)	
2002	"Tonight I Wanna Be Your Man"	Roger Pistole
2003	"The Truth About Men" (with Tracy Byrd, Montgomery Gentry and Blake Shelton)	Thom Oliphant
2005	"If Heaven"	Roman White
2013	"Twenty Little Angels"	
