= 1991 in country music =

This is a list of notable events in country music that took place in the year 1991.

== Events ==
- March 16 — The country music world is stunned when seven members of Reba McEntire's band and her road manager are killed in a plane crash in California. McEntire – who traveled separately – recorded her album, For My Broken Heart in their memory.
- August 16 — Holly Dunn asks that radio stations withdraw her single "Maybe I Mean Yes" due to listener complaints that its lyrics condone date rape.
- August 30 — Country music pioneer, Dottie West is seriously injured while en route to a Grand Ole Opry performance in Nashville, Tennessee. Her fans and contemporaries are deeply saddened when she dies of her injuries September 4 at a Nashville hospital. President George H. W. Bush sends his condolences to the country music world during the CMA Awards later that year.
- September 28 — Ropin' the Wind by Garth Brooks becomes the first album to debut at No. 1 on Billboard magazine's Top Country Albums and Billboard 200 Albums charts. The album, Brooks' third, vaults the 29-year-old singer into superstardom and goes on to sell 16 million copies worldwide. The album became the second best selling album of all genres in 1991, coming in second to Mariah Carey's debut album.
- November 24 — Hot Country Nights begins a one-season run on NBC. The series was created to cash in on the exploding popularity of country music, and showcased several acts on each episode; featured on the premiere were Alabama, Clint Black, K.T. Oslin, Kenny Rogers and Pam Tillis. The series did not catch on in the ratings and is canceled at the end of the season.

=== No dates ===
- Naomi Judd announces she had been diagnosed with Hepatitis C, a potentially fatal chronic liver disease, and would be retiring from touring with daughter Wynonna at the end of the year. The resulting "Farewell" tour becomes the year's top-grossing act in country music and ends with a New Year's Eve pay-per-view concert.
- "SoundScan" is introduced, providing more accurate Billboard magazine chart ratings that are based on actual sales. Immediate evidence proved country music had a much bigger audience than previously thought.
- Eight acts have their first Billboard No. 1 songs, including Mark Chesnutt, Mike Reid, Alan Jackson, Doug Stone, Diamond Rio, Trisha Yearwood, Brooks & Dunn and Lionel Cartwright. Three of those – Diamond Rio, Yearwood and Brooks & Dunn – turn the trick with their first national release; Reid's first solo release also hit the top of the chart, but he had hit the Top 5 as part of a duet with Ronnie Milsap (1988's "Old Folks") three years earlier.

== Top hits of the year ==
=== Singles released by American artists ===
US	CAN	Single	Artist	Reference
1	1	Anymore	Travis Tritt	
3	3	Are You Lovin' Me Like I'm Lovin' You	Ronnie Milsap	
14	11	As Simple as That	Mike Reid	
5	5	Ball and Chain	Paul Overstreet	
14	27	Bing Bang Boom	Highway 101	
5	4	Blame It on Texas	Mark Chesnutt	
22	20	Blue Memories	Patty Loveless	
1	1	Brand New Man	Brooks & Dunn	
1	1	Brother Jukebox	Mark Chesnutt	
2	6	Brotherly Love	Keith Whitley & Earl Thomas Conley	
31	19	Calloused Hands	Mark Collie	
15	9	Can I Count On You	McBride & the Ride	
3	2	The Chill of an Early Fall	George Strait	
3	2	Come On Back	Carlene Carter	
1	2	Daddy's Come Around	Paul Overstreet	
1	1	Don't Rock the Jukebox	Alan Jackson	
5	18	Don't Tell Me What to Do	Pam Tillis	
2	7	Down at the Twist and Shout	Mary Chapin Carpenter	
1	1	Down Home	Alabama	
2	1	Down to My Last Teardrop	Tanya Tucker	
3	1	Drift Off to Dream	Travis Tritt	
22	20	The Eagle	Waylon Jennings	
33	9	Eagle When She Flies	Dolly Parton	
16	10	Even Now	Exile	
2	1	Fallin' Out of Love	Reba McEntire	
8	8	Fancy	Reba McEntire	
15	12	Feed Jake	Pirates of the Mississippi	
9	7	A Few Good Things Remain	Kathy Mattea	
13	21	For Crying Out Loud	Davis Daniel	
1	1	For My Broken Heart	Reba McEntire	
1	1	Forever Together	Randy Travis	
1	3	Forever's as Far as I'll Go	Alabama	
27	18	Get Rhythm	Martin Delray	
19	12	Heart Full of Love	Holly Dunn	
2	3	Here We Are	Alabama	
2	2	Here's a Quarter (Call Someone Who Cares)	Travis Tritt	
4	6	Heroes	Paul Overstreet	
3	1	Heroes and Friends	Randy Travis	
12	10	Hopelessly Yours	Lee Greenwood & Suzy Bogguss	
3	6	Hurt Me Bad (In a Real Good Way)	Patty Loveless	
1	1	I Am a Simple Man	Ricky Van Shelton	
3	3	I Couldn't See You Leavin'	Conway Twitty	
7	4	I Got You	Shenandoah	
4	1	I Thought It Was You	Doug Stone	
40	14	I Wonder How Far It Is Over You	Aaron Tippin	
1	1	I'd Love You All Over Again	Alan Jackson	
5	48	I'm That Kind of Girl	Patty Loveless	
48	18	If I Built You a Fire	Neal McCoy	
1	1	If I Know Me	George Strait	
1	4	If the Devil Danced (In Empty Pockets)	Joe Diffie	
2	1	If You Want Me To	Joe Diffie	
1	1	In a Different Light	Doug Stone	
10	8	Is It Raining at Your House	Vern Gosdin	
6	6	It Won't Be Me	Tanya Tucker	
1	1	Keep It Between the Lines	Ricky Van Shelton	
1	3	Leap of Faith	Lionel Cartwright	
18	15	Let Her Go	Mark Collie	
4	9	Life's Little Ups and Downs	Ricky Van Shelton	
37	15	Life's Too Long (To Live Like This)	Ricky Skaggs	
4	7	Like We Never Had a Broken Heart	Trisha Yearwood	
8	3	Little Things	Marty Stuart	
7	3	Liza Jane	Vince Gill	
16	6	Long Lost Friend	Restless Heart	
7	17	Lord Have Mercy on a Country Boy	Don Williams	
5	6	Love Can Build a Bridge	The Judds	
12	10	Love Will Bring Her Around	Rob Crosby	
1	1	Loving Blind	Clint Black	
6	2	Lucky Moon	The Oak Ridge Boys	
28	20	Mary and Willie	K. T. Oslin	
1	1	Meet in the Middle	Diamond Rio	
8	14	Men	The Forester Sisters	
3	4	Mirror, Mirror	Diamond Rio	
9	11	The Moon Over Georgia	Shenandoah	
1	3	My Next Broken Heart	Brooks & Dunn	
2	2	New Way (To Light Up an Old Flame)	Joe Diffie	
15	2	Nothing's Changed Here	Dwight Yoakam	
17	13	Now That We're Alone	Rodney Crowell	
12	21	Oh What It Did to Me	Tanya Tucker	
6	5	One Hundred and Two	The Judds	
33	17	One Love	Carlene Carter	
7	7	One More Payment	Clint Black	
6	5	One of Those Things	Pam Tillis	
3	2	Only Here for a Little While	Billy Dean	
9	6	A Picture of Me (Without You)	Lorrie Morgan	
7	11	Pocket Full of Gold	Vince Gill	
3	1	Point of Light	Randy Travis	
11	8	Put Yourself in My Place	Pam Tillis	
25	19	Restless	Mark O'Connor and the New Nashville Cats	
15	14	Right Now	Mary Chapin Carpenter	
1	1	Rockin' Years	Dolly Parton with Ricky Van Shelton	
3	1	Rodeo	Garth Brooks	
3	1	Rumor Has It	Reba McEntire	
28	16	Same Old Star	McBride & the Ride	
8	4	Shadow of a Doubt	Earl Thomas Conley	
1	1	Shameless	Garth Brooks	
15	10	She's a Natural	Rob Crosby	
1	1	She's in Love with the Boy	Trisha Yearwood	
15	7	Silver and Gold	Dolly Parton	
6	7	Since I Don't Have You	Ronnie Milsap	
2	—	Small Town Saturday Night	Hal Ketchum	
8	11	Some Guys Have All the Love	Little Texas	
1	2	Someday	Alan Jackson	
12	16	Someday Soon	Suzy Bogguss	
3	2	Somewhere in My Broken Heart	Billy Dean	
29	20	Speak of the Devil	Pirates of the Mississippi	
20	25	Still Burnin' for You	Rob Crosby	
25	8	The Sweetest Thing	Carlene Carter	
5	4	Tempted	Marty Stuart	
4	6	Then Again	Alabama	
17	16	There for Awhile	Steve Wariner	
5	2	These Lips Don't Know How to Say Goodbye	Doug Stone	
23	19	Things Are Tough All Over	Shelby Lynne	
1	1	The Thunder Rolls	Garth Brooks	
12	11	Till I Found You	Marty Stuart	
17	8	Till You Were Gone	Mike Reid	
7	7	Time Passes By	Kathy Mattea	
18	16	Treat Me Like a Stranger	Baillie & the Boys	
4	5	True Love	Don Williams	
11	5	Turn It On, Turn It Up, Turn Me Loose	Dwight Yoakam	
1	1	Two of a Kind, Workin' on a Full House	Garth Brooks	
1	1	Unanswered Prayers	Garth Brooks	
2	5	The Walk	Sawyer Brown	
1	1	Walk on Faith	Mike Reid	
3	3	We Both Walk	Lorrie Morgan	
14	15	We've Got It Made	Lee Greenwood	
10	8	What a Way to Go	Ray Kennedy	
1	1	Where Are You Now	Clint Black	
18	12	Whole Lotta Holes	Kathy Mattea	
4	3	You Don't Count the Cost	Billy Dean	
1	1	You Know Me Better Than That	George Strait	
16	6	You Win Again	Mary Chapin Carpenter	
5	4	You're the One	Dwight Yoakam	
6	13	You've Got to Stand for Something	Aaron Tippin	
3	2	Your Love Is a Miracle	Mark Chesnutt	

=== Singles released by Canadian artists ===
US	CAN	Single	Artist	Reference
73	9	All You Really Wanna Do	Michelle Wright	
39	3	Bluebird	Anne Murray	
—	15	Cry in the Wilderness	Gary Fjellgaard	
—	13	Dance with This Old Cowboy	Gary Fjellgaard	
—	7	Did You Fall in Love with Me	Prairie Oyster	
—	10	Fell in Love and I Can't Get Out	George Fox	
—	19	A Fishing Day	Roch Voisine	
—	16	For Crying Out Loud	Kelita	
—	20	I Know Where You Go	George Fox	
—	9	I Never Met a Liar (I Didn't Like)	Joan Kennedy	
—	16	I Should Have Put a Hold on Love	Carroll Baker	
—	10	Leah	J. K. Gulley	
—	20	The Little Old House Out Back	Michael Peters	
—	15	Lonely You, Lonely Me	Prairie Oyster	
—	14	No Pain, No Gain	Colleen Peterson	
—	20	Not Enough Love to Go 'Round	Michelle Wright	
—	5	Something to Remember You By	Prairie Oyster	
—	9	Springtime in Alberta	Ian Tyson	
—	8	Take Me with You	Patricia Conroy	
—	1	Til I Am Myself Again	Blue Rodeo	
—	9	Watch Love Grow Strong	Rita MacNeil	
—	10	We Don't Always See Eye to Eye	The Good Brothers	
—	19	While You Just Pretend	Tim Taylor	
—	20	Why Baby Why	The Good Brothers	
—	14	Wild Horses	Dick Damron	
—	5	With All My Might	George Fox	

== Top new album releases ==
US	Album	Artist	Record label
15	Aces	Suzy Bogguss	Liberty
7	All I Can Be	Collin Raye	Epic
22	And Along Came Jones	George Jones	MCA Nashville
24	Back to the Grindstone	Ronnie Milsap	RCA Nashville
3	Backroads	Ricky Van Shelton	Columbia
25	The Best of Restless Heart	Restless Heart	RCA Nashville
22	Billy Dean	Billy Dean	SBK/Liberty
3	Brand New Man	Brooks & Dunn	Arista Nashville
23	Buick	Sawyer Brown	Capitol/Curb
4	Chill of an Early Fall	George Strait	MCA Nashville
13	Diamond Rio	Diamond Rio	Arista Nashville
17	Don't Go Near the Water	Sammy Kershaw	Mercury/PolyGram
2	Don't Rock the Jukebox	Alan Jackson	Arista Nashville
1	Eagle When She Flies	Dolly Parton	Columbia
3	Electric Barnyard	The Kentucky Headhunters	Mercury/PolyGram
3	For My Broken Heart	Reba McEntire	MCA Nashville
10	Greatest Hits Vol. II	Alabama	RCA Nashville
7	Greatest Hits Volume Two	The Judds	RCA/Curb
17	Heroes	Paul Overstreet	RCA Nashville
3	High Lonesome	Randy Travis	Warner Bros.
12	I Thought It Was You	Doug Stone	Epic
2	It's All About to Change	Travis Tritt	Warner Bros.
25	Milestones: Greatest Hits	Holly Dunn	Warner Bros.
6	Past the Point of Rescue	Hal Ketchum	Curb
5	Pocket Full of Gold	Vince Gill	MCA Nashville
8	Pure Hank	Hank Williams, Jr.	Curb/Warner Bros.
10	Put Yourself in My Place	Pam Tillis	Arista Nashville
25	Renegade	Charlie Daniels	Epic
1	Ropin' the Wind	Garth Brooks	Liberty
8	Something in Red	Lorrie Morgan	RCA Nashville
10	Sticks and Stones	Tracy Lawrence	Atlantic
16	Talkin' 'Bout Men	The Forester Sisters	Warner Bros.
20	Tempted	Marty Stuart	MCA Nashville
7	Ten Strait Hits	George Strait	MCA Nashville
9	Time Passes By	Kathy Mattea	Mercury/PolyGram
17	Tribute	Roy Rogers	RCA Nashville
2	Trisha Yearwood	Trisha Yearwood	MCA Nashville
22	Turning for Home	Mike Reid	Columbia
6	What Do I Do with Me	Tanya Tucker	Capitol Nashville
23	You've Got to Stand for Something	Aaron Tippin	RCA Nashville

=== Other top albums ===
US	Album	Artist	Record label
60	#1 with a Bullet	Ray Stevens	Capitol/Curb
67	All American Country	The Statler Brothers	Mercury/PolyGram
74	At Last	Gene Watson	Warner Bros.
42	Back Home Again	Kenny Rogers	Reprise
64	Best of Bill Anderson	Bill Anderson	Curb
36	Bing Bang Boom	Highway 101	Warner Bros.
67	Brenda Lee	Brenda Lee	Warner Bros.
27	Burnin' Up the Road	McBride & the Ride	MCA Nashville
27	Chasin' the Sun	Lionel Cartwright	MCA Nashville
28	Clean Shirt	Waylon Jennings & Willie Nelson	Epic
44	A Dozen Roses – Greatest Hits	Desert Rose Band	Curb/MCA Nashville
54	Fighting Fire with Fire	Davis Daniel	Mercury/PolyGram
72	Friends in High Places	George Jones	Epic
57	Get Rhythm	Martin Delray	Atlantic
32	Greatest Hits	Billy Joe Royal	Atlantic
44	High & Dry	Marty Brown	MCA Nashville
28	I Am Ready	Steve Wariner	Arista Nashville
61	I've Got That Old Feeling	Alison Krauss	Rounder
66	Justice	Exile	Arista Nashville
45	Kentucky Bluebird	Keith Whitley	RCA Nashville
62	Key's in the Mailbox	Barbara Mandrell	Capitol Nashville
50	Live Two Five	Nitty Gritty Dirt Band	Liberty
68	My Father's Son	Ricky Skaggs	Epic
66	My Heroes Have Always; Been Cowboys Soundtrack	Various Artists	RCA
70	The Mystery of Life	Johnny Cash	Mercury/PolyGram
59	Navajo Rug	Jerry Jeff Walker	Rykodisc
44	The New Nashville Cats	Mark O'Connor	Warner Bros.
41	Out of My Heart	Vern Gosdin	Columbia
58	Out of Your Ever Lovin' Mind	Dean Dillon	Atlantic
67	Patriot	Johnny Cash	Columbia
29	The Patsy Cline Collection	Patsy Cline	MCA Nashville
38	A Perfect 10	Lee Greenwood	Liberty
55	Soft Talk	Shelby Lynne	Epic
74	Solid Ground	Rob Crosby	Arista Nashville
32	Unchained Melody	Ronnie McDowell	Curb
41	Unstoppable	The Oak Ridge Boys	RCA Nashville
27	Up Against My Heart	Patty Loveless	MCA Nashville
39	Walk the Plank	Pirates of the Mississippi	Capitol Nashville
59	Wanted Recorded or Live	Jimmy Collins	Platinum Edge
36	Western Underground	Chris LeDoux	Liberty
72	Your Precious Love	Ronnie McDowell	Curb
53	Yours Truly	Earl Thomas Conley	RCA Nashville
50	Zone of Our Own	Texas Tornados	Reprise

== On television ==
=== Regular series ===
- Hee Haw (1969–1993, syndicated)
- Hot Country Nights (1991–1992, NBC)

== Births ==
- September 9 – Hunter Hayes, country-pop singer/multi-instrumentalist of the early 2010s best known for his crossover hit "Wanted"
- September 21 – Ingrid Andress, known for her 2019-20 hit "More Hearts Than Mine".
- December 27 – Shay Mooney, member of Dan + Shay, a rising duo of the 2010s.
- September 27 – Sierra Hull, bluegrass singer-songwriter and musician.

== Deaths ==
- February 24 — Webb Pierce, 69, honky tonk stylist and pioneer (pancreatic cancer).
- March 16 — Chris Austin, 27, member of Reba McEntire's road band (plane crash).
- September 4 — Dottie West, 58, legendary and pioneering female vocalist for over three decades (injuries from a car accident).
- October 17 — Tennessee Ernie Ford, 72, "The Old Pea Picker;" pop-country singer and TV host best known for "Sixteen Tons" (liver failure).

== Hall of Fame inductees ==
=== Bluegrass Music Hall of Fame inductees ===
- Flatt and Scruggs
  - Lester Flatt
  - Earl Scruggs
- Bill Monroe

=== Country Music Hall of Fame inductees ===
- Boudleaux & Felice Bryant (Boudleaux Bryant 1920–1987 and Felice (Scaduto) Bryant 1925–2003)

=== Canadian Country Music Hall of Fame inductees ===
- Rhythm Pals
- A. Hugh Joseph

== Major awards ==
=== Grammy Awards ===
- Best Female Country Vocal Performance — "Down at the Twist and Shout", Mary Chapin Carpenter
- Best Male Country Vocal Performance — Ropin' the Wind, Garth Brooks
- Best Country Performance by a Duo or Group with Vocal — "Love Can Build a Bridge," The Judds
- Best Country Collaboration with Vocals — "Restless", Ricky Skaggs, Steve Wariner and Vince Gill
- Best Country Instrumental Performance — The New Nashville Cats, Mark O'Connor
- Best Country Song — "Love Can Build a Bridge", John Barlow Jarvis, Naomi Judd and Paul Overstreet
- Best Bluegrass Album — "Spring Training", Carl Jackson and John Starling

=== Juno Awards ===
- Country Male Vocalist of the Year — George Fox
- Country Female Vocalist of the Year — Cassandra Vasik
- Country Group or Duo of the Year — Prairie Oyster

=== Academy of Country Music ===
- Entertainer of the Year — Garth Brooks
- Song of the Year — "Somewhere in My Broken Heart", Billy Dean and Richard Leigh (Performer: Billy Dean)
- Single of the Year — "Don't Rock the Jukebox", Alan Jackson
- Album of the Year — Don't Rock the Jukebox, Alan Jackson
- Top Male Vocalist — Garth Brooks
- Top Female Vocalist — Reba McEntire
- Top Vocal Duo — Brooks & Dunn
- Top Vocal Group — Diamond Rio
- Top New Male Vocalist — Billy Dean
- Top New Female Vocalist — Trisha Yearwood
- Top New Vocal Duo or Group — Brooks & Dunn
- Video of the Year — "Is There Life Out There", Reba McEntire (Director: Jack Cole)

=== ARIA Awards ===
(presented in Sydney on March 25, 1991)

- Best Country Album - Hand It Down (James Blundell)

=== Canadian Country Music Association ===
- Bud Country Fans' Choice Award — Rita MacNeil
- Male Artist of the Year — George Fox
- Female Artist of the Year — Michelle Wright
- Group of the Year — Prairie Oyster
- SOCAN Song of the Year — "Lonely You, Lonely Me", Joan Besen
- Single of the Year — "New Kind of Love", Michelle Wright
- Album of the Year — Michelle Wright, Michelle Wright
- Top Selling Album — Home I'll Be, Rita MacNeil
- Video of the Year — "Springtime in Alberta", Ian Tyson
- Vista Rising Star Award — South Mountain
- Duo of the Year — The Johner Brothers

=== Country Music Association ===
- Entertainer of the Year — Garth Brooks
- Song of the Year — "When I Call a Your Name", Tim DuBois and Vince Gill (Performer: Vince Gill)
- Single of the Year — "Friends in Low Places", Garth Brooks
- Album of the Year — No Fences, Garth Brooks
- Male Vocalist of the Year — Vince Gill
- Female Vocalist of the Year — Tanya Tucker
- Horizon Award — Travis Tritt
- Vocal Duo of the Year — The Judds
- Vocal Group of the Year — The Kentucky Headhunters
- Vocal Event of the Year — "Restless", Vince Gill, Mark O'Connor, Ricky Skaggs and Steve Wariner
- Music Video of the Year — "The Thunder Rolls", Garth Brooks (Director: Bud Schaetzle)
- Musician of the Year — Mark O'Connor

=== Kennedy Center Honors ===
Country stars who were Honored in 1991

- Roy Acuff

== Other links ==
- Country Music Association
- Inductees of the Country Music Hall of Fame
