= Pretty Little Poison (album) =

Studio album by Warren Zeiders
- Released: August 10, 2023
- Genre: Country
- Length: 44:31
- Label: Warner
- Producer: Ross Copperman

Warren Zeiders chronology
717 Tapes the Album (2022)	Pretty Little Poison (2023)	Relapse (2024)

Singles from Pretty Little Poison
- 1. "Pretty Little Poison" Released: July 10, 2023

Pretty Little Poison is the third studio album by American country music artist Warren Zeiders. It was released on August 10, 2023, via Warner. The title track was released as its lead single in July 2023, and became Zeiders' first number-one hit on the Billboard Country Airplay chart.

== Content ==
Zeiders co-wrote 13 of 14 tracks on Pretty Little Poison, with the exception of "Inside Your Head" penned by Lee Miller and Chris Stapleton. Ross Copperman produced the majority of the album, with Bart Butler and Ryan Gore producing "Coming Down High".

A deluxe reissue of the album was released on February 16, 2024, adding several bonus tracks, including the promotional singles "Sin So Sweet" and "Heartbreaker".

== Track listing ==
Pretty Little Poison track listing
No.	Title	Writer(s)	Length
1.	"Pretty Little Poison"	Warren Zeiders; Ryan Beaver; Jared Keim	3:38
2.	"Some Whiskey"	Zeiders; Mark Holman; Randy Montana	3:03
3.	"Love's a Leavin'"	Zeiders; Ross Copperman; Joybeth Taylor	3:08
4.	"Tell Me Like It Is"	Zeiders; Eric Paslay; Rivers Rutherford	3:08
5.	"Black and Blue"	Zeiders; Beaver; Bart Butler; Joe Clemmons	3:24
6.	"Weeping Willow"	Zeiders; Erik Dylan; Holman; Montana	3:01
7.	"Pain Killer"	Zeiders; Dylan; Channing Wilson	2:47
8.	"Inside Your Head"	Lee Thomas Miller; Chris Stapleton	3:19
9.	"Coming Down High"	Zeiders; Beaver; Butler; Benjy Davis	3:18
10.	"God Only Knows"	Zeiders; Rob Crosby; Paslay	2:51
11.	"Drive You Crazy"	Zeiders; Montana; Stephen Wilson Jr.	3:24
12.	"West Texas Weather"	Zeiders; Austin Taylor Smith	3:09
13.	"Pittsburgh Steel"	Zeiders; Joe Fox; Montana	2:59
14.	"Cowboy Rides Away"	Zeiders; Beaver; Keim	3:15
Total length:			44:31

Deluxe edition track listing
No.	Title	Writer(s)	Length
1.	"Pretty Little Poison"	Warren Zeiders; Ryan Beaver; Jared Keim	3:38
2.	"Heartbreaker"	Zeiders; Julian Bunetta; Mags Duval	3:42
3.	"Happy Hurts"	Zeiders; Beaver; Butler; Davis	3:14
4.	"Sin So Sweet"	Zeiders; Justin Ebach; Blake Pendergrass	3:21
5.	"Pretty Little Poison" (piano version)	Warren Zeiders; Ryan Beaver; Jared Keim	3:36
6.	"Weeping Willow"	Zeiders; Erik Dylan; Holman; Montana	3:01
7.	"Some Whiskey"	Zeiders; Mark Holman; Randy Montana	3:03
8.	"Pain Killer"	Zeiders; Dylan; Channing Wilson	2:47
9.	"Love's a Leavin'"	Zeiders; Ross Copperman; Joybeth Taylor	3:08
10.	"Tell Me Like It Is"	Zeiders; Eric Paslay; Rivers Rutherford	3:08
11.	"Coming Down High"	Zeiders; Beaver; Butler; Benjy Davis	3:18
12.	"Pretty Little Poison" (demo version)	Warren Zeiders; Ryan Beaver; Jared Keim	3:31
13.	"West Texas Weather"	Zeiders; Austin Taylor Smith	3:09
14.	"Inside Your Head"	Lee Miller; Chris Stapleton	3:19
15.	"Black and Blue"	Zeiders; Beaver; Bart Butler; Joe Clemmons	3:24
16.	"Weeping Willow" (acoustic version)	Zeiders; Erik Dylan; Holman; Montana	3:00
17.	"Drive You Crazy"	Zeiders; Montana; Stephen Wilson Jr.	3:24
18.	"God Only Knows"	Zeiders; Rob Crosby; Paslay	2:51
19.	"Pittsburgh Steel"	Zeiders; Joe Fox; Montana	2:59
20.	"Cowboy Rides Away"	Zeiders; Beaver; Keim	3:15
Total length:			64:00

== Charts ==
=== Weekly charts ===
Weekly chart performance for Pretty Little Poison
Chart (2023)	Peak position
Canadian Albums (Billboard)	80
US Billboard 200	59
US Top Country Albums (Billboard)	12

=== Year-end charts ===
Year-end chart performance for Pretty Little Poison
Chart (2024)	Position
US Top Country Albums (Billboard)	37

== Certifications ==
Certifications for Pretty Little Poison
Region	Certification	Certified units/sales
Canada (Music Canada)	Platinum	80,000^{‡}
United States (RIAA)	Gold	500,000^{‡}
^{‡} Sales+streaming figures based on certification alone.
