= 717 Tapes the Album =

Studio album by Warren Zeiders
- Released: September 19, 2022
- Genre: Country
- Length: 44:14
- Label: Warner

Warren Zeiders chronology
Acoustic Covers (2021)	717 Tapes the Album (2022)	Pretty Little Poison (2023)

717 Tapes the Album is the second studio album by American country music artist Warren Zeiders. It was released on September 19, 2022, via Warner. The album was a follow up to the EPs, 717 Tapes and 717 Tapes, Vol II. It produced the single "Ride the Lightning (717 Tapes)", which peaked at No. 30 on the US Hot Country Songs chart.

== Content ==
717 Tapes the Album is Zeiders' second album, following 2021's Acoustic Covers. It is his first album of original work, and contains the single "Ride the Lightning (717 Tapes)" which went viral on TikTok prior to its release. The album contains 15 tracks, with "Loving and Hating You (717 Tapes)" being released as a promotional single prior to the album's release.

== Track listing ==
717 Tapes the Album track listing
No.	Title	Writer(s)	Length
1.	"Ride the Lightning (717 Tapes)"	Warren Zeiders; Eric Paslay; Rob Crosby	3:06
2.	"Never Look Back (717 Tapes)"	Zeiders; Paslay; Tim Nichols; Lindsay Rimes	2:51
3.	"Boys for Life (717 Tapes)"	Zeiders; Justin Walker; Randy Montana	2:51
4.	"Dirt Road Don't (717 Tapes)"	Zeiders; Montana; Erik Dylan	3:12
5.	"Loving and Hating You (717 Tapes)"	Zeiders; Justin Ebach	2:55
6.	"Wild Horse (717 Tapes)"	Zeiders; Brandon Paddock; Martin Johnson	3:12
7.	"Dark Night (717 Tapes)"	Zeiders; Joe Clemmons	2:37
8.	"Southbound (717 Tapes)"	Zeiders; Dylan; Andy Sheridan; Mark Holman; Shy Carter	2:33
9.	"Ain't Been Found (717 Tapes)"	Zeiders; Ben Chapman; Meg McRee	3:40
10.	"Burn It Down (717 Tapes)"	Zeiders; Dylan; Sheridan; Rob Snyder	2:49
11.	"Wild Horse"	Zeiders; Paddock; Johnson	3:15
12.	"Up to No Good"	Zeiders; Rimes; Russell Sutton; Thomas Matthew Karlas	2:13
13.	"One Hell of an Angel"	Zeiders; Benjy Davis; Josh Jenkins	3:31
14.	"Heavy Pour"	Zeiders; Sheridan; Dylan	2:27
15.	"Highway Run"	Zeiders; Paslay; Rivers Rutherford	3:02
Total length:			44:14
