= And So It Goes (album) =

Studio album by Don Williams
- Released: June 19, 2012
- Genre: Country
- Length: 35:40
- Label: Sugar Hill Records
- Producer: Garth Fundis

Don Williams chronology
My Heart to You (2004)	And So It Goes (2012)	Reflections (2014)

Professional ratings
Review scores
Source	Rating
Allmusic	4/5 stars

And So It Goes is a 2012 studio album by American country singer Don Williams. It is his first studio album since My Heart to You in 2004. Released on June 19, 2012 on Sugar Hill Records for US market, the album was made available earlier on April 30, 2012 in certain non-US markets including the UK.

The album is produced by Nashville producer Garth Fundis, with whom he had worked for 17 years on many of his greatest successes. It includes a number of collaborations including notably Alison Krauss, Keith Urban and Vince Gill who contribute vocals and play instruments on the record. Contributing songwriters included Kieran Kane, Ronnie Bowman, Al Anderson and Leslie Satcher, Don's son Tim Williams, as well as Don Williams himself.

"She's a Natural" was originally a Top 20 hit single for Rob Crosby from his 1990 debut album Solid Ground.

== Track listing ==
No.	Title	Writer(s)	Length
1.	"Better Than Today"	Leslie Satcher, Jeff Stevens	3:06
2.	"Heart of Hearts"	Al Anderson, Stephen Bruton, Sharon Vaughn	3:32
3.	"She's with Me"	Don Williams, Tim Williams	3:39
4.	"I Just Come Here for the Music" (feat. Alison Krauss)	Doug Gill, John Ramey, Bobby Taylor	3:56
5.	"Infinity"	Anthony Smith	4:20
6.	"What If It Worked Like That"	Ronnie Bowman, Lynn Hutton, Jason Sellers	2:53
7.	"She's a Natural"	Rick Bowles, Rob Crosby	3:19
8.	"Imagine That" (duet with Keith Urban)	Kieran Kane, Jamie O'Hara	3:12
9.	"First Fool in Line"	Byron Hill, Tammi Kidd	3:45
10.	"And So It Goes"	Mike Noble, Don Williams, Tim Williams	3:57
Total length:			35:40

== Personnel ==
- Al Anderson - electric guitar
- David Angell - violin
- Sam Bacco - marimba
- J.T. Corenflos - electric guitar
- David Davidson - violin
- Billy Davis - background vocals
- Chip Davis - background vocals
- Jeneé Fleenor - fiddle
- Garth Fundis - background vocals
- John Gardner - drums, percussion
- Vince Gill - electric guitar, soloist, background vocals
- Alison Krauss - fiddle and duet vocals on "I Just Came Here for the Music"
- Matt McKenzie - bass guitar, upright bass
- Kenny Malone - percussion
- Anthony LaMarchina - cello
- Mike Noble - acoustic guitar
- Russ Pahl - banjo, dobro, steel guitar, mandolin
- Tyson Rogers - accordion, organ, piano, electric piano
- Billy Sanford - acoustic guitar, electric guitar, gut string guitar, tic tac bass
- Pam Sixfin - violin
- Chris Stapleton - background vocals
- Keith Urban - electric guitar and duet vocals on "Imagine That"
- Kris Wilkinson - string arrangements, viola
- Don Williams - lead vocals
- Tim Williams - background vocals

== Charts ==
Weekly chart performance for "And So It Goes"
Chart (2012)	Peak position
Scottish Albums (OCC)	80
UK Country Albums Chart (OCC)	1
US Billboard 200	100
US Top Country Albums (Billboard)	20
US Independent Albums (Billboard)	23
