= Eric Paslay (album) =

2014 studio album by Eric Paslay an American music artist

Studio album by Eric Paslay
- Released: February 4, 2014
- Recorded: 2011–14
- Genre: Country
- Length: 40:36
- Label: Capitol Records Nashville
- Producers: Marshall Altman (tracks 2–4, 7–11); Daniel Hill (tracks 1,5,6); Billy Lynn (tracks 1,5,6)

Eric Paslay chronology
Eric Paslay (2014)	Nice Guy (2020)

Singles from Eric Paslay
- 1. "Never Really Wanted" Released: July 25, 2011; 2. "Friday Night" Released: April 22, 2013; 3. "Song About a Girl" Released: February 18, 2014; 4. "She Don't Love You" Released: October 13, 2014

Eric Paslay is the debut studio album by American country music artist Eric Paslay. It was released on February 4, 2014, by Capitol Records Nashville. The album includes the singles "Never Really Wanted", "Friday Night", "Song About a Girl" and "She Don't Love You".

== Critical reception ==
Professional ratings
Review scores
Source	Rating
AllMusic	3.5/5 stars
Country Weekly	A
The Oakland Press	3/4 stars
Roughstock	5/5 stars
USA Today	3.5/4 stars

The eponymously titled album Eric Paslay garnered critical acclaim from five music critics. At USA Today, Brian Mansfield rated the album three-and-a-half stars out of four, stating that he held back some excellent material for himself on which "His sweet-as-Southern-tea debut finds common ground between radio-friendly and flat-out brilliant, incorporating a sense of both spirituality and '80s pop." Tammy Ragusa of Country Weekly graded the album an A, writing that the album "hosts a heap of winners." In addition, Ragusa says that "The gifted songwriter has done an incredible job of showcasing his ability to create a collection that leans away from lyrical trends and toward depth and texture [...] reveal[ing] the complexity of an accomplished artist, and retains the purity of solid country music." At The Oakland Press, Gary Graff rated the album three out of four stars, calling this "A strong debut from an established name on the scene." Steve Leggett of AllMusic rated the album three-and-a-half out of five stars, noting how Paslay on the release "keep[s] it simple and catchy", but this means that the music "doesn't change the landscape of contemporary country, but it sure recognizes it, and that's Paslay's songwriting strength." At Roughstock, Matt Bjorke rated the album a perfect five stars, saying that the release "showcases an artist who deserves to be placed on the same songwriting field as singer/songwriters like Rodney Crowell, John Hiatt, Jackson Browne and JD Souther with a little bit of The Band thrown in for good measure." Also, Bjorke states that "There isn’t a bad song to be found on Eric Paslay and it truly is an early contender for the best Country Album of 2014."

== Track listing ==
All tracks are written by Eric Paslay, with additional co-writers as noted.

No.	Title	Writer(s)	Length
1.	"Keep On Fallin'"	Matt Nolan; Skip Black	3:19
2.	"Friday Night"	Rose Falcon; Rob Crosby	2:47
3.	"Less Than Whole"	Kenny Alphin	4:45
4.	"Country Side of Heaven"	Dylan Altman; Shane McAnally	4:15
5.	"Never Really Wanted"	Walt Aldridge	3:27
6.	"Here Comes Love"	Anthony Cappolino	3:05
7.	"Like a Song"	Jason Delkou	2:48
8.	"Good with Wine"	Jessi Alexander; Gordie Sampson	3:40
9.	"She Don't Love You"	Jennifer Wayne	4:27
10.	"Song About a Girl"	Alexander; Sampson	3:49
11.	"Deep as It Is Wide"		4:27
Total length:			40:36

== Personnel ==
- Jessi Alexander- background vocals
- Marshall Altman- Fender Rhodes, percussion, piano, programming, background vocals
- Bruce Bouton- steel guitar
- Tom Bukovac- electric guitar
- Jake Campbell- electric guitar
- Chad Cromwell- drums
- Karen Fairchild- background vocals
- Shannon Forrest- drums
- Tony Harrell- Hammond B-3 organ, piano
- Aubrey Haynie- mandolin
- Natalie Hemby- background vocals
- Daniel Hill- drums, percussion
- Jedd Hughes- electric guitar
- Troy Lancaster- acoustic guitar, electric guitar
- Tim Lauer- Hammond B-3 organ, keyboards, piano
- Tony Lucido- bass guitar
- Pat McGrath- banjo, acoustic guitar
- Rob McNelley- electric guitar
- Jerry McPherson- electric guitar
- Greg Morrow- drums
- Eric Paslay- acoustic guitar, electric guitar, hammer dulcimer, lead vocals, background vocals
- Dave Pomeroy- bass guitar
- Alison Prestwood- bass guitar
- Mike Rojas- keyboards
- Kimberly Schlapman- background vocals
- Adam Shoenfeld- electric guitar
- Phillip Sweet- background vocals
- Russell Terrell- background vocals
- Ilya Toshinsky- banjo, hi-string guitar, mandolin
- Jimi Westbrook- background vocals
- Jonathan Yudkin- fiddle, mandolin

== Chart performance ==
=== Album ===
The album debuted on Billboard 200 at No. 31, and No. 4 in the Top Country Albums chart, selling 11,000 copies in the US. As of February 2015, the album has sold 54,300 copies in the U.S.

Chart (2014)	Peak position
US Billboard 200	31
US Top Country Albums (Billboard)	4

=== Singles ===
Year	Single	Peak chart positions				
Year	Single	US Country	US Country Airplay	US	CAN Country	CAN
2011	"Never Really Wanted"	48	—	—	—	—
2013	"Friday Night"	6	2	47	8	53
2014	"Song About a Girl"	18	12	85	25	—
2014	"She Don't Love You"	15	14	77	28	—
"—" denotes releases that did not chart
