= Relapse (Warren Zeiders album) =

Studio album by Warren Zeiders
- Released: August 23, 2024
- Genre: Country
- Length: 30:57
- Label: Warner
- Producer: Mike Elizondo; Ross Copperman

Warren Zeiders chronology
Pretty Little Poison (2023)	Relapse (2024)	No Brakes (2026)

Relapse, Lies, & Betrayal cover
- Cover for the deluxe re-issue, Relapse, Lies, & Betrayal

Singles from Relapse
- 1. "Relapse" Released: July 29, 2024

Relapse is the fourth studio album by American country music artist Warren Zeiders. It was released on August 23, 2024, via Warner. It produced the title track as its only single. It also produced the promotional singles, "Betrayal", "Intoxicated", and "Addictions", the former two of which charted.

== Content ==
Relapse is Zeiders' fourth album, following 2023's Pretty Little Poison. Singles from the album, "Betrayal", "Relapse", and "Intoxicated" were heavily teased on Zeiders' Instagram prior to release. The title track peaked at No. 4 on the Billboard Bubbling Under Hot 100 chart. "Betrayal" peaked at No. 41 on the US Country Songs Billboard chart. While not included on the album, "Betrayal" and "Relapse" both included instrumental and a cappella releases along with the original songs.

== Relapse, Lies, & Betrayal ==
In October 2024, Zeiders released "You for a Reason" as his first release since Relapse, after previously being teased on his Instagram account. On January 10, 2025, Zeiders released "Can a Heart Take", while simultaneously announcing a deluxe edition re-issue of the album, titled Relapse, Lies, & Betrayal.

It is Zeiders' first double album, and contains the previously released singles, as well as tracks teased on Zeiders' Instagram, most notably "Take It to the Grave" which was teased in early 2024 similar to "Intoxicated" and "Relapse", and "Bad" which was teased near the end of 2024 after the release of Relapse. On February 21, 2025, Zeiders released a third promotional single, "Without You".

== Track listing ==
Relapse track listing
No.	Title	Writer(s)	Length
1.	"Relapse"	Warren Zeiders; Blake Pendergrass; Justin Ebach	2:38
2.	"Intoxicated"	Zeiders; Bart Butler; Benjy Davis; Mark Holman; Randy Montana	2:45
3.	"Betrayal"	Zeiders; Pendergrass; Ebach; Ali Tamposi; Jacob Kasher	3:00
4.	"Addictions"	Zeiders; Alex Maxwell; Rivers Rutherford	3:07
5.	"Stone's Throw Away"	Zeiders; Montana; Holman; Erik Dylan	2:53
6.	"High Desert Road"	Zeiders; Rutherford; Eric Paslay	3:04
7.	"Death of a Cowboy"	Zeiders; Rutherford; Joybeth Taylor	3:17
8.	"Fight Like Hell"	Zeiders; Dylan; Jared Keim; Ryan Beaver	3:27
9.	"Devil I Know"	Zeiders; Joe Clemmons; Mike Walker	3:22
10.	"Love on the Line"	Chris Stapleton; Al Anderson	3:24

Relapse, Lies, & Betrayal track listing
No.	Title	Writer(s)	Length
1.	"Relapse"	Warren Zeiders; Blake Pendergrass; Justin Ebach	2:38
2.	"Lies"	Zeiders; Pendergrass; Ebach; Ross Copperman	2:26
3.	"Betrayal"	Zeiders; Pendergrass; Ebach; Ali Tamposi; Jacob Kasher	3:00
4.	"Can a Heart Take"	Zeiders; Montana; Copperman; Ryan Beaver	3:04
5.	"You for a Reason"	Zeiders; Alex Maxwell; Rivers Rutherford	3:03
6.	"Love in Letting Go" (with Lanie Gardner)	Zeiders; Pendergrass; Tamposi; Kasher; Griff Clawson; Nick Long	3:19
7.	"Bad"	Zeiders; Pendergrass; Tamposi; Kasher; Clawson; Long	2:27
8.	"Crying Whiskey"	Zeiders; Pendergrass; Tamposi; Kasher; Clawson; Long; John Byron	2:51
9.	"Without You"	Zeiders; Pendergrass; Ebach; Copperman	3:00
10.	"Every Single Version of You"	Connor McDonough; Feli Ferraro; Riley McDonough	2:31
11.	"Everything Comes to Go Away"	Ben Goldsmith; Cecilia Castleman	3:26
12.	"Withdrawal"	Zeiders; Maxwell; Russell Sutton	3:05
13.	"Take It to the Grave"	Zeiders; Greylan James; Mark Holman; Matt Roy	3:14
14.	"Intoxicated"	Zeiders; Bart Butler; Benjy Davis; Holman; Montana	2:45
15.	"Addictions"	Zeiders; Maxwell; Rutherford	3:07
16.	"Stone's Throw Away"	Zeiders; Montana; Holman; Erik Dylan	2:53
17.	"High Desert Road"	Zeiders; Rutherford; Eric Paslay	3:04
18.	"Death of a Cowboy"	Zeiders; Rutherford; Joybeth Taylor	3:17
19.	"Fight Like Hell"	Zeiders; Dylan; Jared Keim; Beaver	3:27
20.	"Devil I Know"	Zeiders; Joe Clemmons; Mike Walker	3:22
21.	"Love on the Line"	Chris Stapleton; Al Anderson	3:24

== Charts ==
=== Weekly charts ===
Weekly chart performance for Relapse, Lies, & Betrayal
Chart (2025–2026)	Peak position
Australian Albums (ARIA)	57
Australian Country Albums (ARIA)	9
Canadian Albums (Billboard)	65
UK Album Downloads (Official Charts)	50
US Billboard 200	63
US Top Country Albums (Billboard)	12

=== Year-end charts ===
Year-end chart performance for Relapse, Lies, & Betrayal
Chart (2025)	Position
US Top Country Albums (Billboard)	73

== Certifications ==
Certifications for Relapse, Lies, & Betrayal
Region	Certification	Certified units/sales
Canada (Music Canada)	Gold	40,000^{‡}
^{‡} Sales+streaming figures based on certification alone.
