= Ride the Lightning (717 Tapes) =

2021 single by Warren Zeiders

Single by Warren Zeiders

from the album 717 Tapes the Album
- Released: June 25, 2021
- Genre: Country
- Length: 3:06
- Label: Warren Zeiders
- Songwriters: Eric Paslay; Rob Crosby; Warren Zeiders
- Producer: Warren Zeiders

Warren Zeiders singles chronology
"Ride the Lightning (717 Tapes)" (2021)	"On the Run" (2021)

Music video
- "Ride the Lightning (717 Tapes)" on YouTube

"Ride the Lightning (717 Tapes)" is the debut single by American country music singer Warren Zeiders. It was released on June 25, 2021 from his debut studio album, 717 Tapes the Album. The song was co-written by Sean Zeiders, Eric Paslay and Rob Crosby. He also had another version of the song come out for its first anniversary with Travis Barker playing the drums.

== Content ==
The phrase Ride the Lightning was coined by Stephen King in his novel The Stand. It's slang for a convict being executed in the electric chair. The song went viral on TikTok which helped the song garner over 85 million streams, and over 200 million views and 1.3 million followers on TikTok.

== Chart performance ==
"Ride the Lightning (717 Tapes)" debuted at number 30 on the Billboard Hot Country Songs chart dated July 10, 2021, after its release.

== Charts ==
=== Weekly charts ===
Weekly chart performance for "Ride the Lightning (717 Tapes)"
Chart (2021)	Peak position
US Hot Country Songs (Billboard)	30

=== Year-end charts ===
Year-end chart performance for "Ride the Lightning (717 Tapes)"
Chart (2021)	Position
US Hot Country Songs (Billboard)	95

== Certifications ==
Certifications for "Ride the Lightning (717 Tapes)"
Region	Certification	Certified units/sales
Canada (Music Canada)	3× Platinum	240,000^{‡}
New Zealand (RMNZ)	Gold	15,000^{‡}
United States (RIAA)	Platinum	1,000,000^{‡}
^{‡} Sales+streaming figures based on certification alone.

== Release history ==
Release history for "Ride the Lightning (717 Tapes)"
Region	Date	Format	Label	Ref.
Various	June 25, 2021	Digital download; streaming	Warren Zeiders	
