= Relapse (song) =

2024 single by Warren Zeiders

Single by Warren Zeiders

from the album Relapse
- Released: July 29, 2024
- Genre: Country rock
- Length: 2:38
- Label: Warner
- Songwriters: Warren Zeiders; Blake Pendergrass; Justin Ebach
- Producer: Mike Elizondo

Warren Zeiders singles chronology
"Pretty Little Poison" (2023)	"Relapse" (2024)	"Overrated" (2026)

Music video
- "Relapse" on YouTube

"Relapse" is a song by American country music singer Warren Zeiders. It was released on July 29, 2024, as the first single and title track from his album of the same name. The song was written by Zeiders, Blake Pendergrass and Justin Ebach, and produced by Mike Elizondo.

== Critical reception ==
The Music Universe writer Buddy Iahn referred to the song as "fits perfectly into the hard-rock edge Zeiders brings to country".

== Charts ==
=== Weekly charts ===
Weekly chart performance for "Relapse"
Chart (2024–2025)	Peak position
US Bubbling Under Hot 100 Singles (Billboard)	4
US Country Airplay (Billboard)	33
US Hot Country Songs (Billboard)	30

=== Year-end charts ===
2024 year-end chart performance for "Relapse"
Chart (2024)	Position
US Hot Country Songs (Billboard)	85

2025 year-end chart performance for "Relapse"
Chart (2025)	Position
US Hot Country Songs (Billboard)	58

== Certifications ==
Certifications for "Relapse"
Region	Certification	Certified units/sales
Canada (Music Canada)	2× Platinum	160,000^{‡}
^{‡} Sales+streaming figures based on certification alone.
