= Ryan Beaver =

American singer-songwriter

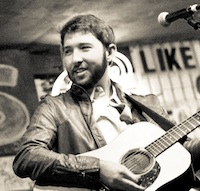

Background information
- Birth name: Ryan Embry Beaver
- Born: March 17, 1984 (age 41); Hunt County, Texas
- Origin: Austin, Texas
- Genres: Country, Texas Country Music
- Occupation(s): Singer, songwriter
- Years active: 2007- Present
- Website: ryanbeaver.com

Ryan Embry Beaver (born March 17, 1984) is an American country music singer-songwriter from Emory, Texas. Born on March 17, 1984, and growing up in East Texas, Beaver moved South and began his musical career while he was attending Texas State University in San Marcos, Texas. Beaver currently lives in Nashville, Tennessee.

== Career ==
Wrote the #1 song "Pretty Little Poison" performed by Warren Zeiders. It was the first number one for both of them.

Beaver's first album, Under the Neons, was released on February 27, 2008. The album spawned 3 singles for Texas radio: "I Shoulda Kissed You", "Under the Neons", and "Streets of Austin".

Beaver's second album, Constant, was released February 8, 2011. David Grissom produced the album, with co-write credits for himself, Wade Bowen, Brian Keane, Ben Danaher, and Paul Eason. "For A While", "Hate", and "Nobody Wants to be Alone" were the singles sent to radio respectively. "Hate" became Beaver's highest charting single to date (#2 for 3 weeks) on the Texas Music Chart and earned a "Favorite Song of 2011" nod from galleywinter.com.

Country Weekly described his lyrics as "thoughtful, introspective, and extremely well crafted" in their December 10, 2012, issue.

Beaver's first music video for "How About You" was featured on CMT Pure, CMT.com, Yallwire.com, NoDepression.com among others.

== Songwriting ==
A BMI writer, Beaver co-wrote "Along the Way" and "More Than Willing" with Rob Baird (I Swear It's The Truth released on Carnival Records). He also co-wrote "Day by Day", "Make Or Break Me" and "Leavin' Stephenville" with Kyle Park, the latter two appearing on Park's Make Or Break Me album released in 2011. As of 2017, Beaver is signed to the Nashville-based publishing company, SMACKSongs.

Year	Artist	Album	Song	Co-writer(s)
2008	Ryan Beaver	Under the Neons	"Under the Neons"	Beaver
2008	Ryan Beaver	Under the Neons	"Sing-a-long Country Song"	Beaver
2008	Ryan Beaver	Under the Neons	"You Talk About It"	Beaver
2008	Ryan Beaver	Under the Neons	"Two Words Shy of Lonely"	Beaver
2008	Ryan Beaver	Under the Neons	"Call Me"	Beaver
2008	Ryan Beaver	Under the Neons	"Whatever the Night May Bring"	Beaver
2008	Ryan Beaver	Under the Neons	"Hellbound"	Beaver
2008	Ryan Beaver	Under the Neons	"I Shoulda Kissed You"	Beaver
2008	Ryan Beaver	Under the Neons	"I Thought I Knew"	Beaver
2008	Ryan Beaver	Under the Neons	"Too Tall Jimmy"	Beaver
2008	Ryan Beaver	Under the Neons	"Streets of Austin"	Beaver
2008	Ryan Beaver	Under the Neons	"South Texas Skyline"	Beaver
2011	Ryan Beaver	Constant	"One More Song"	Beaver, Wade Bowen
2011	Ryan Beaver	Constant	"Constant"	Beaver
2011	Ryan Beaver	Constant	"You Don't Need Much"	Beaver, Brian Keane
2011	Ryan Beaver	Constant	"Let Me Be Your Saturday Night"	Beaver, Paul Eason
2011	Ryan Beaver	Constant	"Hate"	Beaver
2011	Ryan Beaver	Constant	"Nobody Wants to Be Alone"	Beaver, David Grissom
2011	Ryan Beaver	Constant	"How About You"	Beaver, Ben Danaher
2011	Ryan Beaver	Constant	"Never Let You Go"	Beaver
2011	Ryan Beaver	Constant	"Beale Street"	Beaver
2011	Ryan Beaver	Constant	"For A While"	Beaver
2011	Kyle Park	Make Me or Break Me	"Day by Day"	Beaver, Kyle Park
2011	Kyle Park	Make Me or Break Me	"Leavin' Stephenville"	Beaver, Kyle Park
2011	Kyle Park	Make Me or Break Me	"Make Or Break Me"	Beaver, Kyle Park
2012	Rob Baird	I Swear It's The Truth	"More Than Willing"	Beaver, Rob Baird
2012	Rob Baird	I Swear It's The Truth	"Along The Way"	Beaver, Rob Baird
2016	Ryan Beaver	Rx	"When This World Ends" (feat. Maren Morris)	Beaver, Jeremy Spillman, Jared Crump
2016	Ryan Beaver	Rx	"If I Had a Horse"	Beaver, Brett Tyler
2016	Ryan Beaver	Rx	"Rx"	Beaver, Jeremy Spillman, Ryan Tyndell
2016	Ryan Beaver	Rx	"Still Yours"	Beaver
2016	Ryan Beaver	Rx	"Gravedigger"	Beaver, Jeremy Spillman, Ryan Tyndell
2016	Ryan Beaver	Rx	"Vegas"	Beaver, Jeremy Spillman, Jeff Hyde, Ryan Tyndell
2016	Ryan Beaver	Rx	"Habit"	Beaver, Jeremy Spillmam
2016	Ryan Beaver	Rx	"Jesus Was a Capricorn"	Intro of "Jesus Was a Capricorn" exclusively written by Kris Kristofferson
2016	Ryan Beaver	Rx	"Kristofferson"	Beaver, Jessi Alexander, Jon Randall
2016	Ryan Beaver	Rx	"Fast"	Ryan Beaver, Josh Osborne, Jeremy Spillman, Ryan Tyndell
2016	Ryan Beaver	Rx	"Rum & Roses"	Beaver, Josh Osborne, Ryan Tyndell
2016	Ryan Beaver	Rx	"Dark"	Beaver, Ryan Tyndell, Matt Nolen
2018	Tyler Dial	Repaint	"The Night Fire Met Gasoline"	Beaver, Silvas, Jeremy Spillman
2018	Steve Moakler	Born Ready	"Breaking New Ground"	Beaver, Steve Moakler, Neil Medley
2018	HARDY	This Ole Boy	"4X4"	HARDY, Nick Donley
2018	Ashley Monroe	Sparrow	"Mother's Daughter"	Ashley Monroe, Brendan Benson
2018	Brinley Addington	Single	"No Thanks"	Beaver, Brett Tyler, Will Weatherly
2019	Lauren Duski	Midwestern Girl	Runnin' (To You)	Beaver, Matt McGinn, Lauren Duski

== Discography ==
=== Albums ===
Title	Album details	Peak chart positions	
Title	Album details	US Country	US Heat
Under the Neons	Release date: February 27, 2008; Label: St. Beaver	—	—
Constant	Release date: February 8, 2011; Label: St. Beaver	—	—
Rx	Release date: May 6, 2016; Label: St. Beaver	41	24
"—" denotes releases that did not chart

=== Music videos ===
Year	Video	Director
2012	"How About You"	Jordan Bellamy
2016	"Dark"	Patrick Tracy
