= She Don't Love You =

Single by Eric Paslay

from the album Eric Paslay
- Released: October 13, 2014
- Recorded: 2013
- Genre: Country
- Length: 4:27
- Label: EMI Nashville
- Songwriters: Eric Paslay; Jennifer Wayne
- Producer: Marshall Altman

Eric Paslay singles chronology
"Song About a Girl" (2014)	"She Don't Love You" (2014)	"High Class" (2015)

"She Don't Love You" is a song co-written and recorded by American country music artist Eric Paslay. It was released on October 13, 2014 as the fourth and final single from Paslay's self-titled debut album. Paslay wrote the song with Runaway June's Jennifer Wayne. It was originally written for George Strait.

== Critical reception ==
Billy Dukes of Taste of Country gave the song a favorable review, calling it "a well-told story about a woman whose heart has been shattered one time too many" and writing that "Paslay exposes one’s most buried vulnerabilities." Markos Papadatos of Digital Journal wrote that "one can feel the raw emotions that Paslay sings about."

== Music video ==
The music video was directed by Wes Edwards and premiered in March 2015.

== Chart performance ==
"She Don't Love You" debuted at number 52 on the U.S. Billboard Country Airplay chart for the week of November 1, 2014. It also debuted at number 50 on the U.S. Billboard Hot Country Songs chart for the week of November 22, 2014. The song has sold 389,000 copies in the US as of June 2015.

Chart (2014–2015)	Peak position
Canada Country (Billboard)	28
US Billboard Hot 100	77
US Country Airplay (Billboard)	14
US Hot Country Songs (Billboard)	15

=== Year-end charts ===
Chart (2015)	Position
US Country Airplay (Billboard)	66
US Hot Country Songs (Billboard)	58
