= A Thousand Winding Roads =

Studio album by Joe Diffie
- Released: September 7, 1990
- Recorded: Early 1990
- Studios: The Bennett House, Franklin, TN
- Genre: Country
- Length: 31:13
- Label: Epic
- Producers: Bob Montgomery; Johnny Slate

Joe Diffie chronology
A Thousand Winding Roads (1990)	Regular Joe (1992)

Singles from A Thousand Winding Roads
- 1. "Home" Released: August 21, 1990; 2. "If You Want Me To" Released: December 11, 1990; 3. "If the Devil Danced (In Empty Pockets)" Released: April 2, 1991; 4. "New Way (To Light Up an Old Flame)" Released: June 29, 1991

Professional ratings
Review scores
Source	Rating
AllMusic	4.5/5 stars
Entertainment Weekly	C+

A Thousand Winding Roads is the debut studio album by American country music artist Joe Diffie. The album's title is derived from a line in its lead-off single "Home", which reached #1 on the Billboard Hot Country Singles & Tracks (now Hot Country Songs) charts in late 1990. Other singles from this album include "If You Want Me To" (#2) "If the Devil Danced (In Empty Pockets)" (#1), and "New Way (To Light Up an Old Flame)" (#2). "There Goes The Neighborhood" would later be recorded by Shania Twain on her debut album and "Stranger in Your Eyes" would later be recorded by Ken Mellons on his 1995 album, Where Forever Begins.

== Track listing ==
No.	Title	Writer(s)	Length
1.	"Home"	Fred Lehner, Andy Spooner	3:20
2.	"If the Devil Danced (In Empty Pockets)"	Ken Spooner, Kim Williams	2:45
3.	"If You Want Me To"	Joe Diffie, Larry Williams	3:42
4.	"New Way (To Light Up an Old Flame)"	Diffie, Lonnie Wilson	2:42
5.	"There Goes the Neighborhood"	Bill C. Graham, Alan Laney, Tommy Dodson	3:14
6.	"Almost Home"	L. Williams, Johnny Slate	3:17
7.	"I Ain't Leavin' 'Til She's Gone"	Diffie, Wilson, Wayne Perry	3:04
8.	"Coolest Fool in Town"	Randy Boudreaux	3:25
9.	"Liquid Heartache"	Diffie, Red Lane	2:59
10.	"Stranger in Your Eyes"	Joe Chambers, Max D. Barnes, Larry Jenkins	2:45

== Personnel ==
- Mike Chapman – bass guitar
- Walt Cunningham – synthesizer
- Joe Diffie – lead vocals, background vocals
- Paul Franklin – steel guitar, pedabro
- Rob Hajacos – fiddle
- Bill Hullett – acoustic guitar
- Brent Mason – electric guitar
- Tim Mensy – electric guitar
- Johnny Neel – background vocals
- Ron Oates – keyboards
- Dave Pomeroy – bass guitar
- Matt Rollings – keyboards
- Mike Severs – mandolin, acoustic guitar
- Lonnie Wilson – drums, background vocals

== Charts ==
=== Weekly charts ===
Chart (1990–1991)	Peak position
US Top Country Albums (Billboard)	23

=== Year-end charts ===
Chart (1991)	Position
US Top Country Albums (Billboard)	40
