= Greatest Hits Vol. II (Alabama album) =

1991 album by the American band, Alabama

Greatest hits album by Alabama
- Released: October 8, 1991
- Recorded: 1991 (new tracks); 1982-1984, 1987-1989 (older tracks)
- Genre: Country
- Length: 43:14
- Label: RCA Nashville
- Producer: Various producers and Alabama

Alabama chronology
Pass It On Down (1990)	Greatest Hits Vol. II (1991)	American Pride (1992)

Singles from Greatest Hits Vol. II
- 1. "Then Again" Released: September 23, 1991; 2. "Born Country" Released: December 26, 1991

Professional ratings
Review scores
Source	Rating
Allmusic	4.5/5 stars

Greatest Hits Vol. II is the second compilation album by American country music band Alabama. The album was released by RCA Records in 1991, and has since been certified platinum for sales of 1 million units by the Recording Industry Association of America.

As with Alabama's first greatest hits album, Greatest Hits Vol. II includes many of the band's biggest hits of the 1980s, a decade in which they sold millions of albums, had 26 No. 1 singles on Billboard magazine's Hot Country Singles chart and won the "Entertainer of the Decade" honor from the Academy of Country Music. Seven of the album's 10 songs went to No. 1 between 1982–1989; three of them – "Take Me Down", "Dixieland Delight" and "Roll On (Eighteen Wheeler)" – are presented here in their original album-length versions, while "The Closer You Get" is presented in its single-edit form and "Fallin' Again" in its shorter LP edit.

Two of the album's three new tracks were released as singles, "Then Again" and "Born Country", both of which were top 5 hits on the Billboard Hot Country Singles & Tracks chart.

== Track listing ==
No.	Title	Writer(s)	Length
1.	"Born Country (Previously unreleased)"	Byron Hill, John Schweers	3:19
2.	"Then Again (Previously unreleased)"	Rick Bowles, Jeff Silbar	3:43
3.	"Dixieland Delight"	Ronnie Rogers	5:22
4.	"Lady Down on Love""	Randy Owen	3:57
5.	"The Closer You Get (single edit)"	J.P. Pennington, Mark Gray	3:38
6.	"Roll On (Eighteen Wheeler)""	Dave Loggins	4:20
7.	"Fallin' Again (Vinyl LP edit)"	Owen, Teddy Gentry, Greg Fowler	3:58
8.	"Song of the South"	Bob McDill	3:15
9.	"High Cotton"	Roger Murrah, Scott Anders	3:00
10.	"Take Me Down"	Pennington, Gray	4:53
11.	"Hats Off (Previously unreleased)"	Owen, Gentry, Fowler, Rogers	3:55

== Personnel on New Tracks ==
Alabama

- Jeff Cook - background vocals
- Teddy Gentry - bass guitar, background vocals
- Randy Owen - lead vocals

Mark Herndon, Alabama's drummer, does not play on the new tracks.

Additional Musicians

- Sam Bush - fiddle, mandolin
- John Catchings - cello
- Bill Cuomo - keyboards
- Connie Ellisor - violin
- Jim Grosjean - viola
- Craig Krampf - drums, percussion
- Josh Leo - electric guitar
- Carl Marsh - keyboards, string arrangements
- Biff Watson - acoustic guitar
- John Willis - electric guitar

== Chart performance ==
Chart (1991)	Peak position
U.S. Billboard Top Country Albums	10
U.S. Billboard 200	72
Canadian RPM Country Albums	13

== Certifications ==
Region	Certification	Certified units/sales
United States (RIAA)	Platinum	1,000,000^{^}
^{^} Shipments figures based on certification alone.
