= Friday Night (Lady Antebellum song) =

2011 song by Eric Paslay

Promotional single by Lady Antebellum

from the album Own the Night
- Released: 2011
- Recorded: 2011
- Genre: Country
- Length: 2:57
- Label: Capitol Nashville
- Songwriters: Eric Paslay; Rose Falcon; Rob Crosby
- Producers: Paul Worley and Lady Antebellum

"Friday Night" is a song written by Eric Paslay, Rose Falcon and Rob Crosby. It was originally recorded by American country music trio Lady Antebellum on their 2011 album Own the Night. It was later recorded by Paslay in 2013 as his third single for EMI Nashville, and as a song on his self-titled debut album in 2014.

== Lady Antebellum version ==
"Friday Night" was included on the track listing of Lady Antebellum's 2011 studio album Own the Night. Entertainment Weekly described the song as "'80s-rock rave-up that sounds exactly like Eddie Money". In a review of the album, American Songwriter was critical of "Friday Night", calling it "a poorly drawn caricature of rock & roll".

== Eric Paslay version ==
"Friday Night"

Single by Eric Paslay

from the album Eric Paslay
- Released: April 22, 2013
- Recorded: 2013
- Genre: Country
- Length: 2:47
- Label: EMI Nashville
- Songwriters: Eric Paslay; Rose Falcon; Rob Crosby
- Producer: Marshall Altman

Eric Paslay singles chronology
"If the Fish Don't Bite" (2012)	"Friday Night" (2013)	"Song About a Girl" (2014)

The song was later recorded by Paslay and released on April 22, 2013, as his third single for EMI Nashville. It is included on his self-titled debut album, which was released on February 4, 2014.

=== Critical reception ===
Billy Dukes of Taste of Country gave the song three and a half stars out of five, writing that "it’s wide-open, catchy and easy to fall in love with, even if it’s not exactly crammed full of tangible memories." Matt Bjorke of Roughstock also gave the song three and a half stars out of five, calling it "a melodic, arena-ready sing-a-long type of song" and saying that "Paslay's take on the song is much, much more grounded in Country Music's roots [than Lady A's recording] with banjos and fiddles audibly in the mix."

=== Music video ===
The music video was directed by Mason Dixon and premiered in August 2013.

=== Chart performance ===
"Friday Night" debuted at number 57 on the U.S. Billboard Country Airplay chart for the week of May 11, 2013. It also debuted at number 49 on the U.S. Billboard Hot Country Songs chart for the week of July 27, 2013. It has sold 504,000 copies in the US as of April 2014.

Chart (2013–2014)	Peak position
Canada Hot 100 (Billboard)	53
Canada Country (Billboard)	8
US Billboard Hot 100	47
US Country Airplay (Billboard)	2
US Hot Country Songs (Billboard)	6

==== Year-end charts ====
Chart (2013)	Position
US Country Airplay (Billboard)	65
US Hot Country Songs (Billboard)	77

Chart (2014)	Position
US Country Airplay (Billboard)	48
US Hot Country Songs (Billboard)	54

=== Certifications ===
Region	Certification	Certified units/sales
United States (RIAA)	Gold	500,000^{‡}
^{‡} Sales+streaming figures based on certification alone.
