= Song About a Girl =

Single by Eric Paslay

from the album Eric Paslay
- Released: February 18, 2014
- Recorded: 2013
- Genre: Country
- Length: 3:49
- Label: EMI Nashville
- Songwriters: Eric Paslay; Jessi Alexander; Gordie Sampson
- Producer: Marshall Altman

Eric Paslay singles chronology
"Friday Night" (2013)	"Song About a Girl" (2014)	"She Don't Love You" (2014)

"Song About a Girl" is a song co-written and recorded by American country music artist Eric Paslay. It was released on February 18, 2014, as the third single from Paslay's self-titled debut album. Paslay wrote the song with Jessi Alexander and Gordie Sampson.

The song received positive reviews from critics who praised its outlaw production vibe and Paslay's confident performance. "Song About a Girl" peaked at numbers 12 and 18 on both the Billboard Country Airplay and Hot Country Songs charts respectively. It also charted at number 85 on the Hot 100. The song had minor chart success in Canada, peaking at number 25 on the Country chart. The accompanying music video was directed by Wes Edwards and features screen tests of various women dressed in different outfits.

== Critical reception ==
Billy Dukes of Taste of Country gave the song a favorable review, calling it "one of the best songs released this year." Dukes felt that "the industrial rhythm section and vocal effects strip the traditional edge from this song and provide an outlaw vibe that Paslay seems very comfortable taking forward." Matt Bjorke of Roughstock gave the song four and a half stars out of five, calling it "a moody, melodic slice of modern Country music with an inviting melody and a sing-a-long chorus." Bjorke wrote that it "feels like the kind of song that could've been a hit in any era."

== Commercial performance ==
"Song About a Girl" debuted at number 50 on the Billboard Country Airplay chart for the week of March 15, 2014. It also debuted at number 46 on the Hot Country Songs chart for the week of April 5. It peaked at numbers 12 and 18 on both charts for the week of July 19, staying for 24 and 21 weeks respectively. On the week of June 21, the single debuted at number 98 on Hot 100 chart, and peaked at number 85 for two consecutive weeks from July 12 to 19, remaining on the chart for ten weeks. The song has sold 215,000 copies in the U.S. as of July 2014.

In Canada, the track debuted at number 49 on the Canada Country chart for the week of May 17, 2014, and peaked at number 25 the week of August 30, staying on the chart for 19 weeks.

== Music video ==
The music video was directed by Wes Edwards and premiered in June 2014. The video features screen tests for a music film, where actresses are dressed in various outfits and acting as the character of said outfit. Paslay is shown playing a guitar while having a projector screening being played behind him.

== Charts ==
=== Weekly charts ===
Chart (2014)	Peak position
Canada Country (Billboard)	25
US Billboard Hot 100	85
US Country Airplay (Billboard)	12
US Hot Country Songs (Billboard)	18

=== Year-end charts ===
Chart (2014)	Position
US Country Airplay (Billboard)	58
US Hot Country Songs (Billboard)	60
