= Never Really Wanted =

Single by Eric Paslay

from the album Eric Paslay
- Released: July 25, 2011
- Recorded: 2011
- Genre: Country
- Length: 3:30
- Label: EMI Nashville
- Songwriter(s): Walt Aldridge; Eric Paslay
- Producer(s): Marshall Altman

Eric Paslay singles chronology
"Never Really Wanted" (2011)	"If the Fish Don't Bite" (2012)

"Never Really Wanted" is a debut song co-written and recorded by American country music artist Eric Paslay. It was released on July 25, 2011 as the first single from Paslay's self-titled debut album.

== Critical reception ==
Billy Dukes of Taste of Country gave the song a four-star review, saying that "The debut single from Eric Paslay is the cute but shy kid in class. It’s not going to sweep you off your feet the first time you lay ears on it. No, ‘Never Really Wanted’ is built for the long run. It’s a song you can fall in love with." Liv Carter of Urban Country News gave the song a "thumbs up", praising Paslay's vocals as well as the song's chorus. She summarized her review by saying that "So, country radio, do your thing and make this a solid hit. Eric Paslay already has Top 10 success as co-writer of Jake Owen‘s ‘Barefoot Blue Jean Night’. Now it’s time for him to stand in the spotlight all by himself.

== Chart performance ==
Chart (2011)	Peak position
US Hot Country Songs (Billboard)	48
