= Sin So Sweet =

Song by Warren Zeiders

from the album Pretty Little Poison (Deluxe Edition)
- Released: November 17, 2023
- Genre: Rock
- Length: 3:21
- Label: Warner
- Songwriters: Blake Pendergrass; Justin Ebach; Warren Zeiders
- Producer: Justin Ebach

Warren Zeiders singles chronology
"Pretty Little Poison" (2023)	"Sin So Sweet" (2023)	"Heartbreaker" (2024)

Music video
- "Sin So Sweet" on YouTube

"Sin So Sweet" is a song by American country music singer Warren Zeiders, released on November 17, 2023, as a promotional single ahead of the deluxe reissue of his 2023 album, Pretty Little Poison. Zeiders co-wrote the song with Blake Pendergrass and Justin Ebach, the latter of whom also produced it.

== Composition and lyrics ==
The song is a departure from Zeiders's usual country sound, instead opting for a rock sound. Lyrically, the song is about toxic love.

== Charts ==
Weekly chart performance for "Sin So Sweet"
Chart (2023)	Peak position
US Billboard Bubbling Under Hot 100	21
US Hot Country Songs (Billboard)	39

== Certifications ==
Certifications for "Sin So Sweet"
Region	Certification	Certified units/sales
Canada (Music Canada)	Platinum	80,000^{‡}
^{‡} Sales+streaming figures based on certification alone.
