= Nice Guy (album) =

Studio album by Eric Paslay
- Released: August 14, 2020
- Studio: Sound Emporium (Nashville, Tennessee)
- Genre: Country
- Length: 45:03
- Label: Paso Fino Records
- Producer: Eric Paslay; F. Reid Shippen; Tofer Brown

Eric Paslay chronology
Eric Paslay (2014)	Nice Guy (2020)

Nice Guy is the second studio album by American country music artist Eric Paslay. It was released August 14, 2020 by Paso Fino Records. It was produced by F. Reid Shippen and Eric Paslay.

== Critical reception ==
Nancy Kruh of People states that Paslay's "melodies teem with energy, and his lyrics are filled with poetic treasures and warmed by his supple voice".

Jessica Nicholson of MusicRow described the title track as "a tongue-in-cheek look at nice guys who finish last", while "Woman Like Her", penned with Charles Kelley and Laura Veltz, "pays tribute to lasting love".

== Track listing ==
1. "Heartbeat Higher" (featuring Sarah Buxton) – 3:38
2. "Boat in a Bottle" – 3:26
3. "I Took a Pill in Ibiza" – 4:58
4. "Off the Edge of the Summer" – 3:55
5. "Just Once" – 3:21
6. "Nice Guy" – 2:50
7. "Under Your Spell" – 3:16
8. "Fingertips" – 3:49
9. "Wild and Young" – 3:42
10. "Endless Summer Dream" – 3:24
11. "On This Side of Heaven" – 4:20
12. "Woman Like Her" – 4:24
