= Rose Falcon =

American singer/songwriter

- Falcon performing live in 2011

Background information
- Born: May 2, 1984 (age 42); New York City, New York, U.S.
- Genres: Rock, Country, pop
- Occupations: Singer, songwriter
- Instruments: Guitar, vocals
- Labels: Columbia, Show Dog-Universal Music
- Spouse: Rodney Atkins (m. 2013)
- Website: www.rosefalcon.com

Rose Falcon (born May 2, 1984) is an American singer and songwriter. Falcon's songs have been recorded by Faith Hill, Lady A, Day of Fire, Eric Paslay, and Jessie James Decker. Falcon has also written and performed songs which are included in the soundtracks of Confessions of a Teenage Drama Queen, Master of Disguise, Raising Helen, Dawson's Creek, Hart of Dixie, and Inspector Gadget 2 and have also been used in ad campaigns for Verizon Wireless, JC Penney, Build-A-Bear Workshop, and Estée Lauder.

Falcon is currently signed to Spirit Music Group out of Nashville, Tennessee.

== Biography ==
Rose Falcon is the daughter of singer-songwriter Billy Falcon and hairdresser Myla Falcon. Her early years were spent in a studio apartment in New York City, although the family moved to New Jersey when she was old enough to attend school. In 1987, her mother was diagnosed with breast cancer and died two years later (inspiring the song "Best Friend"), forcing her father to raise her himself as he traveled around the country for his music career. Falcon was ten years old when they moved to Nashville. Inspired by the loss of her mother and feeling out of place throughout her school years, she began writing poetry which eventually led to songwriting.

Falcon signed to Columbia Records at the age of fourteen and released her debut album, Rose Falcon, in 2003. In August 2011, she signed with Show Dog-Universal Music and began working on her first country pop album, which was later released in the form of two EP's entitled, "19th Avenue Volume 1" and "19th Avenue Volume 2 and received an endorsement from Jon Bon Jovi.

"Give In to Me", a song co-written by Falcon, Billy Falcon, and Elisha Hoffman, was recorded by Country singer Faith Hill for the soundtrack of the motion picture Country Strong. "Friday Night", a song written by Falcon, Rob Crosby, and Eric Paslay, was recorded by Lady Antebellum for their 2011 album, Own the Night. "Friday Night", was later recorded by Eric Paslay and released as a single on April 22, 2013, and reached number one on the Mediabase country chart.

== Personal life ==
In June 2013, Falcon became engaged to country artist Rodney Atkins. The couple married in November 2013 in a small ceremony on Captiva Island. Together, they have two sons, born in December 2017 and August 2019. Falcon also has a stepson, Elijah, from Atkins's previous marriage.

== Discography ==
=== Singles ===
- Fun (2002)
- The Restlessness w/ Bastien Laval (2010) (performed by Rose Falcon under the pseudonym "Layla")
- You Stole My Heart (2012)
- If Love Had a Heart (2012)
- "Like Crazy" (2013)

=== Albums ===
- Rose Falcon (2003)
- Fingerprints (2008)
- 19th Avenue, The EP (2012)
- 19th Avenue (The EP Volume 2) (2013)

She released an EP in 2022 with Rodney Atkins

=== Music videos ===
Year	Video	Director
2003	"Up, Up, Up"	
2013	"If Love Had a Heart"	Greg Travis
2013	"Like Crazy"	Greg Travis

== See also ==
- Billy Falcon
- Own the Night
