= Working Woman (song) =

Single by Rob Crosby

from the album Solid Ground
- B-side: "The Woman in You"
- Released: January 1992
- Genre: Country
- Length: 3:04
- Label: Arista
- Songwriter(s): Rob Crosby, Tim DuBois, Will Robinson
- Producer(s): Scott Hendricks

Rob Crosby singles chronology
"Still Burnin' for You" (1991)	"Working Woman" (1992)	"She Wrote the Book" (1992)

"Working Woman" is a song co-written and recorded by American country music artist Rob Crosby. It was released in January 1992 as the fourth single from the album Solid Ground. The song reached #28 on the Billboard Hot Country Singles & Tracks chart. The song was written by Crosby, Tim DuBois and Will Robinson.

== Chart performance ==
Chart (1992)	Peak position
US Hot Country Songs (Billboard)	28
Canadian RPM Country Tracks	29
