= Born Country =

1991 single by the American band, Alabama

Single by Alabama

from the album Greatest Hits Vol. II
- B-side: "Until It Happens to You"
- Released: December 26, 1991
- Recorded: August 9, 1991
- Genre: Country
- Length: 3:20
- Label: RCA Nashville
- Songwriters: Byron Hill, John Schweers
- Producers: Josh Leo, Larry Michael Lee, Alabama

Alabama singles chronology
"Then Again" (1991)	"Born Country" (1991)	"Take a Little Trip" (1992)

"Born Country" is a song written by Byron Hill and John Schweers, and recorded by American country music band Alabama. It was released in December 1991 as the second and final single on their compilation album Greatest Hits Vol. II. It reached No. 1 on the Radio & Records chart in March 1992. It also reached number 2 on the Billboard Hot Country Songs charts, behind "Dallas" by Alan Jackson.

The single was one of three new tracks on Alabama's Greatest Hits Vol. II album (the other two being "Then Again" and "Hats Off") and was released in 1992 by RCA Nashville. The song won an ASCAP Award for being among the most performed country songs of 1992.

The song was also recorded and released in April 1991 with an accompanying video by Ian Eaton & Battle River, of Saskatchewan, Canada.

== Content ==
The song is a mid-tempo in which the narrator expresses his pride for the country.

== Chart positions ==
Chart (1991–1992)	Peak position
Canada Country Singles (RPM)	2
US Hot Country Songs (Billboard)	2

=== Year-end charts ===
Chart (1992)	Position
Canada Country Tracks (RPM)	41
US Country Songs (Billboard)	17
