= High Class =

Single by Eric Paslay
- Released: October 5, 2015
- Recorded: 2015
- Genre: Country
- Length: 3:08
- Label: EMI Nashville
- Songwriters: Corey Crowder; Jesse Frasure; Eric Paslay
- Producer: Marshall Altman

Eric Paslay singles chronology
"She Don't Love You" (2014)	"High Class" (2015)	"The Driver" (2015)

"High Class" is a song and recorded by American country music artist Eric Paslay. It was released on October 5, 2015. Paslay wrote the song with Corey Crowder and Jesse Frasure.

== Content ==
The song is about two country lovers spending a night in the city.

== Critical reception ==
Website Taste of Country gave the song a positive review, calling it "Eric Paslay’s “High Class” continues the singer’s streak of releasing edgy, blues-soaked country cuts over more middle-of-the-road country-rockers."

== Music video ==
The music video was directed by Wes Edwards and premiered in March 2016.

== Chart performance ==
Chart (2015–2016)	Peak position
US Country Airplay (Billboard)	32
US Hot Country Songs (Billboard)	32
