= Another Time and Place =

Studio album by Rob Crosby
- Released: July 28, 1992
- Genre: Country
- Length: 36:38
- Label: Arista Nashville (07822-18710-2)
- Producer: Scott Hendricks

Rob Crosby chronology
Solid Ground (1991)	Another Time and Place (1992)	Starting Right Now (1995)

Singles from Another Time and Place
- 1. "She Wrote the Book" Released: June 1992; 2. "In the Blood" Released: November 1992

Another Time and Place is the second major studio album by the American country music singer Rob Crosby. It was released on July 28, 1992, via Arista Nashville. The album includes the singles "She Wrote the Book" and "In the Blood".

== Track listing ==
1. "She Wrote the Book" (Steve Bogard, Rick Giles) — 2:42
2. "We'll Cross That Bridge" (Rick Bowles, Gary Burr, Rob Crosby) — 2:46
3. "Cold Day in Tennessee" (Burr, Crosby) — 2:55
4. "String of Bad Love" (Jim Sandefur) — 2:53
5. "Another Time and Place" (Crosby) — 3:14
6. "Tried and True" (Rick Bowles, Crosby) — 3:41
7. "In the Blood" (Bob DiPiero, John Jarrard, Mark D. Sanders) — 4:16
8. "You Can't Walk This Road Alone" (Austin Cunningham, Allen Shamblin) — 3:32
9. "Old News" (Rick Bowles, Crosby, Mac McAnally) — 4:07
10. "When Hearts Agree" (Kent Blazy, Crosby, Billy Dean) — 3:00
11. "I'm Down and She's Out" (Crosby, Thom McHugh) — 3:33

== Personnel ==
- Rob Crosby – lead vocals, backing vocals, acoustic guitar
- Dennis Burnside – acoustic piano
- Bill Cuomo – keyboards
- Don Potter – acoustic guitar
- Brent Rowan – electric guitar
- Michael Severs – electric guitar
- Bruce Bouton – steel guitar, lap steel guitar
- Buck Reid – steel guitar
- Pat Severs – lap steel guitar
- Stuart Duncan – fiddle, mandolin
- Willie Weeks – bass
- Glenn Worf – bass
- Eddie Bayers – drums
- Harry Stinson – drums
- Terry McMillan – percussion
- Michael Black – backing vocals
- Gary Burr – backing vocals
- Jimmy Hall – backing vocals
- Mac McAnally – backing vocals

== Singles ==
Year	Single	Peak chart positions	
Year	Single	US Country	CAN Country
1992	"She Wrote the Book"	53	73
1992	"In the Blood"	48	53
