= Rob Baird =

American singer-songwriter

- Born: Memphis, Tennessee
- Genres: Americana
- Occupation: Singer-songwriter
- Years active: 2010–present
- Labels: Carnival Recording Company, Hard Luck Recording Company
- Website: http://www.robbairdmusic.com/

Rob Baird is an Americana and country music singer-songwriter, producer, and musician from Memphis, Tennessee. He released his debut album, Blue Eyed Angels (Carnival Recording Company), in 2010 and his sophomore effort, I Swear It's the Truth, in May 2012. His third record, Wrong Side of The River, was released on May 13, 2016. His fourth album, After All, was released on January 11, 2019. His fifth record, Anthems, was released on May 19, 2022.

== Biography ==
Baird relocated from Memphis, Tennessee to Fort Worth, Texas in 2005 to attend Texas Christian University, where he earned a degree in Entrepreneurial Management. During his time at Texas Christian, at the age of 21, he recorded his debut project. The album Blue Eyed Angels was produced by Scott Davis and featured musicians from Hayes Carll's band. That initial effort featured the singles, "Fade Away" (a top 5 single on the Texas Music Chart), "Could Have Been My Baby," and the title track.

In 2012 Baird followed up Blue Eyed Angels with I Swear It's The Truth, named one of the top twenty albums of the year by Spin Magazine. I Swear It's The Truth featured the hit single, “Dreams and Gasoline” which was added to XM’s "The Highway" and was featured in the ABC drama Nashville. The video for the single was shot in Joshua Tree, CA and was supported by CMT and their multiple platforms.

In 2013 Baird's "More Than Willing" was featured on Lifetime's Army Wives. Three of his songs have also been used in season three of CW's Hart of Dixie ("Same Damn Thing" in episode 10, "More Than Willing" in episode 17, and "40 Days and 40 Nights" in episode 20).

Over the years, Baird has kept an active touring schedule balancing support slots with Jason Isbell, Billy Joe Shaver, The Steeldrivers, Don Williams, and many others with developing an impressive string of headlining dates in several major markets.

Baird relocated to Austin, Texas in 2015 and recorded his third record, Wrong Side of the River, released on May, 13th, 2016 on Baird's label Hard Luck Recording Company. Produced by Brian Douglas Phillips, the album presents a stark contrast to some of Baird's previous work. Wrong Side of the River is laden with the blues of Memphis and the outlaw alt-country.

In 2016 "Mississippi Moon" and "Cowboy Cliché" from Wrong Side of the River were featured on the Netflix original series The Ranch.

Baird's highly anticipated fourth record After All was released January 11, 2019.

== Critical reception ==
Roughstock Country gave I Swear It's the Truth 4.5/5 stars, saying "Everything about I Swear It's The Truth suggests a young artist ready to break into the big leagues."

Spin Magazine included I Swear It's the Truth on their "Top Albums of 2012" list, calling him a "young, affable folk-pop charmer."

Baird was featured in Billboard's "Spotlight" section in May 2012 covering the release of I Swear It's the Truth.

In 2015 the Dallas Observer slated Baird's "Dreams and Gasoline" to be one of the 50 best Texas Red Dirt Songs

In 2016, Baird premiered a three-part video series featuring songs from Wrong Side of The River on NPR, stating that the videos and the music were "a thematic journey from defiance to reflection to the hope for redemption". No Depression stated that Wrong Side of The River as "Wrenching punches to the gut, with powerhouse blues rock and soul, as well as poignant pulls on our hearts with heart-rending ballads". Spin Magazine described Wrong Side of The River as "Baird takes his traditional country to a deeper place, with sparse acoustic chords allowing his reflective lyricism to breathe".

== Discography ==
=== Albums ===
Title	Album details	Peak chart positions	
Title	Album details	US Country	US Heat
Blue Eyed Angels	Release date: August 31, 2010; Label: Carnival Recording Company	—	—
I Swear It's the Truth	Release date: May 22, 2012; Label: Carnival Recording Company	57	35
Wrong Side of the River	Release date: May 13, 2016; Label: Hard Luck Recording Company	48	2
After All	Release date: January 11, 2019; Label: Hard Luck Recording Company	32	2
Anthems	Release date: May 19, 2022; Label: Carnival Recording Company	—	—
"—" denotes releases that did not chart

=== Music videos ===
Year	Video	Director
2013	"Dreams and Gasoline"	Eric Ryan Anderson
2016	"Ain't Nobody Got a Hold On Me"	Matt Bizer
2016	"Wrong Side of the River"	Matt Bizer
2016	"Horses"	Matt Bizer

=== Television placements ===
Song title	Television program	Season: Episode	Episode title	Air date
"More Than Willing"	Army Wives	Season 7: Episode 12	"Damaged"	June 2, 2013
"Same Damn Thing"	Hart of Dixie	Season 3: Episode 10	"Star of the Show"	January 20, 2014
:More Than Willing"	Hart of Dixie	Season 3: Episode 17	"A Good Run of Bad Luck"	April 20, 2014
"40 Days and 40 Nights"	Hart of Dixie	Season 3: Episode 20	"Together Again"	May 2, 2014
"Dreams and Gasoline"	Nashville	Season 2: Episode 22	"Your Good Girl's Gonna Go Bad"	May 1, 2014
"Dreams and Gasoline"	Yellowstone	Season 2: Episode 9	"Enemies by Monday"	August 21, 2019
