= If the Devil Danced (In Empty Pockets) =

Single by Joe Diffie

from the album A Thousand Winding Roads
- B-side: "I Ain't Leavin' 'Til She's Gone"
- Released: April 2, 1991
- Genre: Country
- Length: 2:45
- Label: Epic
- Songwriters: Ken Spooner, Kim Williams
- Producers: Bob Montgomery, Johnny Slate

Joe Diffie singles chronology
"If You Want Me To" (1990)	"If the Devil Danced (In Empty Pockets)" (1991)	"New Way (To Light Up an Old Flame)" (1991)

"If the Devil Danced (In Empty Pockets)" is a song written by Ken Spooner and Kim Williams, and recorded by American country music singer Joe Diffie. The song reached the top of the Billboard Hot Country Singles & Tracks (now Hot Country Songs) chart. It was released in April 1991 as the third single from his debut album, A Thousand Winding Roads.

== Music video ==
The music video was directed by Michael Salomon and premiered in early 1991.

== Critical reception ==
Cashbox magazine published a positive review of the song, stating that it "focuses on a much lighter storyline, compared to previous releases. This cut humorously sheds a 'devil-made-me-do-it' theme swallowed up by a fun and bouncy tempo."

== Chart performance ==
The song debuted at No. 47 on the Hot Country Singles & Tracks chart dated April 6, 1991. It charted for 20 weeks on that chart, and peaked at No. 1 on the country chart dated June 15, 1991, giving Diffie his second No. 1 single.

=== Charts ===
Chart (1991)	Peak position
Canada Country Singles (RPM)	4
US Hot Country Songs (Billboard)	1

=== Year-end charts ===
Chart (1991)	Position
Canada Country Tracks (RPM)	64
US Country Songs (Billboard)	22

== Other versions ==
Koe Wetzel and Jack Ingram covered the song on Hardy's 2024 mixtape, Hixtape: Vol. 3: Difftape.
