= Then Again (song) =

Single by Alabama

from the album Greatest Hits Vol. II
- B-side: "Hats Off"
- Released: September 23, 1991
- Recorded: 1991
- Genre: Country
- Length: 3:43
- Label: RCA Nashville
- Songwriters: Rick Bowles; Jeff Silbar
- Producers: Alabama; Larry Michael Lee; Josh Leo

Alabama singles chronology
"Here We Are" (1991)	"Then Again" (1991)	"Born Country" (1992)

"Then Again" is a song written by Jeff Silbar and Rick Bowles, and recorded by American country music group Alabama. It was released in September 1991 as the first single from their compilation album Greatest Hits Vol. II. The song reached number 4 on the Billboard Hot Country Singles & Tracks chart in December 1991.

== Chart performance ==
"Then Again" debuted at number 61 on the U.S. Billboard Hot Country Singles & Tracks for the week of September 28, 1991.

Chart (1991)	Peak position
Canada Country Singles (RPM)	6
US Hot Country Songs (Billboard)	4

=== Year-end charts ===
Chart (1991)	Position
Canada Country Tracks (RPM)	98
