= She's a Natural =

Single by Rob Crosby

from the album Solid Ground
- B-side: "Somewhere Down the Line"
- Released: March 1991
- Genre: Country
- Length: 3:18
- Label: Arista
- Songwriters: Rob Crosby, Rick Bowles
- Producer: Scott Hendricks

Rob Crosby singles chronology
"Love Will Bring Her Around" (1990)	"She's a Natural" (1991)	"Still Burnin' for You" (1991)

"She's a Natural" (1991) is a song co-written and recorded by American country music artist Rob Crosby. It was released in March 1991 as the second single from the album Solid Ground. The song reached number 15 on the Billboard Hot Country Singles & Tracks chart. The song was written by Crosby and Rick Bowles.

== Cover versions ==
Don Williams covered the song on his 2012 album And So It Goes.

== Chart performance ==
Chart (1991)	Peak position
Canada Country Singles (RPM)	10
US Hot Country Songs (Billboard)	15

=== Year-end charts ===
Chart (1991)	Position
Canada Country Tracks (RPM)	89
