= Love Will Bring Her Around =

Single by Rob Crosby

from the album Solid Ground
- B-side: "(Nobody's Gonna) Hurt My Heart"
- Released: October 1990
- Genre: Country
- Length: 2:40
- Label: Arista
- Songwriters: Rob Crosby, Will Robinson
- Producer: Scott Hendricks

Rob Crosby singles chronology
"This Is The Night" (1988)	"Love Will Bring Her Around" (1990)	"She's a Natural" (1991)

"Love Will Bring Her Around" is a song co-written and recorded by American country music artist Rob Crosby. It was released in October 1990 as the first single from his debut album Solid Ground. The song reached No. 12 on the Billboard Hot Country Singles & Tracks chart. Crosby wrote this song with Will Robinson.

== Chart performance ==
Chart (1990–1991)	Peak position
Canada Country Singles (RPM)	10
US Hot Country Songs (Billboard)	12

=== Year-end charts ===
Chart (1991)	Position
Canada Country Tracks (RPM)	92
