= Renegade (Charlie Daniels album) =

Studio album by Charlie Daniels
- Released: April 23, 1991
- Recorded: 1990–1991
- Studio: Sound Stage Studios, Nashville, TN
- Length: 35:42
- Label: Epic
- Producer: James Stroud

Charlie Daniels chronology
Christmas Time Down South (1990)	Renegade (1991)	The Devil Went Down to Georgia (1993)

Professional ratings
Review scores
Source	Rating
Allmusic	4/5 stars

Renegade is a studio album by American musician Charlie Daniels. It was released in 1991 via Epic Records. The album peaked at number 25 on the Billboard Top Country Albums chart.

"Layla" is a cover by Derek and the Dominos, from their 1970 album, Layla and Other Assorted Love Songs.

"Fathers and Sons" is a cover of a Waylon Jennings song called "Between Fathers and Sons" from his 1987 album, Hangin' Tough.

== Track listing ==
1. "Renegade" (Charlie Daniels, Taz DiGregorio, Charlie Hayward, Jack Gavin, Bruce Ray Brown) – 3:57
2. "Talk to Me Fiddle" (Daniels, DiGregorio, Hayward, Gavin, Brown) – 3:34
3. "Little Folks" (Daniels) – 3:14
4. "Honky Tonk Life" (Daniels) – 3:23
5. "Layla" (Eric Clapton, Jim Gordon) – 3:02
6. "The Twang Factor" (Stephen Allen Davis) – 3:22
7. "Fathers and Sons" (John Barlow Jarvis, Gary Nicholson) – 3:48
8. "What My Baby Sees in Me" (Jerry Laseter, James Dean Hicks, Mark Alan Springer) – 3:06
9. "Willie Jones" (Daniels) – 3:15
10. "Let Freedom Ring" (Daniels, DiGregorio, Hayward, Gavin, Brown) – 5:01

== Personnel ==
- Charlie Daniels - banjo, fiddle, mandolin, guitar, lead vocals
- Taz DiGregorio - keyboards
- Charlie Hayward - bass guitar
- Jack Gavin - drums, percussion
- Bruce Ray Brown - guitar, harmonica, background vocals
- Carolyn Corlew - background vocals
- Fisk University Jubilee Singers - background vocals
- Bobby Jones - background vocals
- New Life Community Choir - background vocals
- James Stroud - background vocals

== Chart performance ==
Chart (1991)	Peak position
U.S. Billboard Top Country Albums	25
U.S. Billboard 200	139
