= Get Rhythm =

Song by Johnny Cash

- Side A of 1969 US single

Single by Johnny Cash
- A-side: "I Walk the Line"
- B-side: "Hey Porter"
- Released: September 1969
- Recorded: 1956
- Genre: Rockabilly
- Length: 2:13
- Label: Sun 1103
- Songwriter: Johnny Cash
- Producer: Sam Phillips

Johnny Cash singles chronology
"A Boy Named Sue" (1969)	"Get Rhythm" (1969)	"Blistered" (1969)

"Get Rhythm" is a song written and recorded by American singer-songwriter and musician Johnny Cash. It was originally released as the B-side to the single release "I Walk the Line" in 1956 on Sun 241. It was re-released with overdubbed "live" effects in September 1969 as an A-side single and reached number 60 on the Billboard Pop chart.

== Critical reception ==
Alice Randall in the book My Country Roots: The Ultimate MP3 Guide to America's Original Outsider Music asks the question, "racist, racialist, or race appreciating? You decide. Maybe the grinning 'boy' hides something worth knowing in his mask as well as behind his mask. Well maybe he was white trash."

== Chart performance ==
"Get Rhythm" was released in 1956 as the B-side to Cash's first #1 hit, "I Walk the Line." In 1969, the original recording of "Get Rhythm" was released as a single itself, with sound effects dubbed in to simulate the sound of a live recording. This rerelease went to #23 on the country charts.

Chart (1969)	Peak position
US Hot Country Songs (Billboard)	23
US Billboard Hot 100	60
Canadian RPM Country Tracks	1
Canadian RPM Top Singles	59

== Other versions ==
NRBQ first recorded Terry Adams' rock'n'roll arrangement of "Get Rhythm" on At Yankee Stadium (1978), and again on Grooves in Orbit (1982).

In 1986 British pub rock band Dr. Feelgood released a cover on their album Brilleaux.

Ry Cooder first recorded a cover version of Get Rhythm for his eleventh studio album entitled 'Get Rhythm', released in November 1987. It was also included on 'The Ry Cooder Anthology: The UFO Has Landed (October 2008)'

== Martin Delray version ==
"Get Rhythm"

Single by Martin Delray

from the album Get Rhythm
- B-side: "The Very Thought of You"
- Released: 1991
- Genre: Country
- Length: 2:52
- Label: Atlantic
- Songwriter: Johnny Cash
- Producers: Blake Mevis, Nelson Larkin

Martin Delray singles chronology
"Temptation" (1985)	"Get Rhythm" (1991)	"Lillie's White Lies" (1991)

In 1991, Martin Delray recorded a cover of the song on his debut album, also entitled Get Rhythm. Released as his debut single, Delray's version featured guest vocals from Cash, as well as a guest appearance by him in the music video. It peaked at #27 on the country charts.

=== Chart performance ===
Chart (1991)	Peak position
Canada Country Singles (RPM)	18
US Hot Country Songs (Billboard)	27
