= Get Rhythm (Martin Delray album) =

Studio album by Martin Delray
- Released: 1991
- Genre: Country
- Length: 33:40
- Label: Atlantic
- Producer: Blake Mevis, Nelson Larkin

Martin Delray chronology
Get Rhythm (1991)	What Kind of Man (1992)

Get Rhythm is the debut studio album by American country music artist Martin Delray. It was released in 1991 via Atlantic Records. The album includes the singles "Get Rhythm", "Lillie's White Lies", and "Who, What, Where, When, Why, How".

== Critical reception ==
Alex Henderson of AllMusic rated the album four stars out of five, stating that it was "unpredictable" and "indicated that Delray was a singer to keep an eye on".

== Track listing ==
No.	Title	Writer(s)	Length
1.	"Get Rhythm"	Johnny Cash	2:49
2.	"The Very Thought of You"	Ray Noble	3:40
3.	"One in a Row"	Martin Delray, Wood Newton	3:38
4.	"If the Wind Blows Sand"	Delray	4:00
5.	"New Wine"	Delray, Bill Shore	2:59
6.	"Lillie's White Lies"	Newton, Billy Ray Reynolds	3:01
7.	"Silence Says It All"	Jim Rushing	3:04
8.	"Someone to Love You"	Ted Chalfant	3:44
9.	"I Let Love Do My Talkin'"	Delray, Shore, Hodges Rippy	3:46
10.	"Who, What, Where, When, Why, How"	Jeff Crossan	2:58

== Chart performance ==
Chart (1990)	Peak position
US Top Country Albums (Billboard)	57
