= Even Now (Exile song) =

Single by Exile

from the album Justice
- B-side: "One Too Many Times"
- Released: June 22, 1991
- Genre: Country
- Length: 3:26
- Label: Arista
- Songwriters: Marc Beeson; Randy Sharp
- Producers: Tim DuBois; Randy Sharp

Exile singles chronology
"There You Go" (1990)	"Even Now" (1991)	"Nothing at All" (1991)

"Even Now" is a song written by Marc Beeson and Randy Sharp, and recorded by American country music group Exile. It was released in June 1991 as the first single from the album Justice. The song reached number 16 on the Billboard Hot Country Singles & Tracks chart.

== Music video ==
The music video was directed by Bill Young, and premiered in early 1991.

== Chart performance ==
Chart (1991)	Peak position
Canada Country Singles (RPM)	10
US Hot Country Songs (Billboard)	16
