= Still Burnin' for You =

Single by Rob Crosby

from the album Solid Ground
- B-side: "Solid Ground"
- Released: August 1991
- Genre: Country
- Length: 3:08
- Label: Arista
- Songwriter: Rob Crosby
- Producer: Scott Hendricks

Rob Crosby singles chronology
"She's a Natural" (1991)	"Still Burnin' for You" (1991)	"Working Woman" (1992)

"Still Burnin' for You" is a song written and recorded by American country music artist Rob Crosby. It was released in August 1991 as the third single from the album Solid Ground. The song reached number 20 on the Billboard Hot Country Singles & Tracks chart.

In 1994 Dutch 'The CG Band' recorded a cover version of this song for their album "Without Frontiers". The CG Band consisted of dutch singer/songwriters/music journalists John Smulders and Henk Korsten with famous pedalsteel guitar player Cor Verhaegh. Later that year the band performed the song live with Rob while he was in The Netherlands to do some shows.

== Chart performance ==
Chart (1991)	Peak position
Canada Country Singles (RPM)	25
US Hot Country Songs (Billboard)	20
