= Justice (Exile album) =

Studio album by Exile
- Released: June 25, 1991
- Genre: Country
- Length: 50:38
- Label: Arista
- Producer: Randy Sharp, Tim DuBois

Exile chronology
Still Standing (1990)	Justice (1991)	The Complete Collection (1991)

Justice is the twelfth studio album by American country pop group Exile. It was released on June 25, 1991, via Arista Records. The album includes the singles "Even Now" and "Nothing at All".

== Content ==
Justice was Exile's second album with lead singer Paul Martin, who joined in 1988. Lead single "Even Now" charted at number 16 on Billboard Hot Country Songs in 1991, representing Exile's last appearance on that chart. The next single was "Nothing at All", which, according to Martin, was withdrawn as a single due to concerns that it sounded too similar to Reba McEntire's "For My Broken Heart". The label chose "Somebody's Telling Her Lies" as a potential replacement, but the song was never released as a single due to the band members questioning its potential and Exile existed Arista instead.

== Critical reception ==
Jim Patterson of the Associated Press rated the album favorably, praising the variety of musicianship on it. He thought "Dreams Die Hard" and Mac McAnally's "The Invisible Man" were the strongest lyrically.

== Track listing ==
No.	Title	Writer(s)	Length
1.	"Even Now"	Marc Beeson, Randy Sharp	3:26
2.	"One Too Many Times"	Sonny LeMaire, Sharp	3:58
3.	"One More Reason"	Lee Carroll, Sharp	4:02
4.	"Dreams Die Hard"	LeMaire, Sharp	3:46
5.	"What You See"	LeMaire, Sharp	3:33
6.	"(For You, For Me) Forever"	LeMaire, Sharp	4:35
7.	"Shot in the Dark"	LeMaire, Sharp	3:37
8.	"Somebody's Telling Her Lies"	Sharp	4:09
9.	"All in Good Time"	LeMaire, Sharp	3:37
10.	"Nothing at All"	Susan Longacre, Johnny Pierce	4:02
11.	"The Invisible Man"	Mac McAnally	3:18
12.	"If There's Any Justice"	LeMaire, Sharp	5:01

== Chart performance ==
Chart (1991)	Peak position
US Top Country Albums (Billboard)	66
