= Martin Delray =

American singer-songwriter

- Birth name: Michael Ray Martin
- Also known as: Mike Martin
- Born: September 29, 1949 (age 75)
- Origin: Texarkana, Arkansas, U.S.
- Genres: Country
- Occupation: Singer-songwriter
- Instrument(s): Vocals, rhythm guitar
- Years active: 1985 – 1992
- Labels: Compleat; Atlantic

Michael Ray Martin (born September 29, 1949, in Texarkana, Arkansas) is an American country music artist, known professionally as Martin Delray. He worked as a songwriter in the 1980s, with his writing credits including "Old Fashioned Love" by The Kendalls. Delray's first single release was "Temptation" in 1985 on the Compleat label, credited to Mike Martin.

He recorded two albums on the Atlantic Records label: 1991's Get Rhythm and 1992's What Kind of Man. In addition, he charted five singles on the Billboard Hot Country Singles & Tracks charts. Delray's highest-charting single was a cover version of Johnny Cash's "Get Rhythm," which Delray took to #27 on the country charts. Cash sang guest vocals on Delray's version and was featured in its music video.

He also sang the National Anthem at WCW Fall Brawl 1994.

== Discography ==
=== Albums ===
Title	Album details	Peak positions
Title	Album details	US Country
Get Rhythm	Release date: January 16, 1991; Label: Atlantic Records	57
What Kind of Man	Release date: November 10, 1992; Label: Atlantic Records	—
"—" denotes releases that did not chart

=== Singles ===
Year	Single	Peak chart positions		Album
Year	Single	US Country	CAN Country	Album
1985	"Temptation" (as Mike Martin)	76	—	Single only
1991	"Get Rhythm"	27	18	Get Rhythm
1991	"Lillie's White Lies"	58	—	Get Rhythm
1992	"Who, What, Where, When, Why, How"	51	70	Get Rhythm
1992	"What Kind of Man"	61	72	What Kind of Man
"—" denotes releases that did not chart

=== Music videos ===
Year	Title	Director
1991	"Get Rhythm"	
1991	"Lillie's White Lies"	
1992	"Who, What, Where, When, Why, How"	
