= New Way (To Light Up an Old Flame) =

Single by Joe Diffie

from the album A Thousand Winding Roads
- B-side: "Coolest Fool in Town"
- Released: June 29, 1991
- Genre: Country
- Length: 2:42
- Label: Epic
- Songwriters: Joe Diffie, Lonnie Wilson
- Producers: Johnny Slate, Bob Montgomery

Joe Diffie singles chronology
"If the Devil Danced (In Empty Pockets)" (1991)	"New Way (To Light Up an Old Flame)" (1991)	"Is It Cold in Here" (1991)

"New Way (To Light Up an Old Flame)" is a song co-written and recorded by American country music artist Joe Diffie. It was released in June 1991 as the fourth and final single from his debut album A Thousand Winding Roads. The song peaked at number 2 on the Hot Country Singles & Tracks (now Hot Country Songs) chart. The song was written by Diffie and Lonnie Wilson.

== Chart positions ==
Chart (1991)	Peak position
Canada Country Singles (RPM)	2
US Hot Country Songs (Billboard)	2

=== Year-end charts ===
Chart (1991)	Position
Canada Country Tracks (RPM)	45
US Country Songs (Billboard)	41
