= If You Want Me To =

Single by Joe Diffie

from the album A Thousand Winding Roads
- B-side: "Home"
- Released: December 11, 1990
- Genre: Country
- Length: 3:42
- Label: Epic
- Songwriters: Joe Diffie, Larry Williams
- Producers: Johnny Slate, Bob Montgomery

Joe Diffie singles chronology
"Home" (1990)	"If You Want Me To" (1990)	"If the Devil Danced (In Empty Pockets)" (1991)

"If You Want Me To" is a song co-written and recorded by American country music singer Joe Diffie. It was released in December 1990 as the second single from his debut album A Thousand Winding Roads. The song reached the Top 5 on the Billboard Hot Country Singles & Tracks (now Hot Country Songs) chart. The song was written by Diffie and Larry Williams.

== Music video ==
This was Diffie's first music video. It was directed by Marius Penczner and premiered in late 1990.

== Chart performance ==
The song debuted at number 53 on the Hot Country Singles & Tracks chart dated December 15, 1990. It charted for 20 weeks on that chart, and peaked at number 2 on the country chart dated March 2, 1991.

=== Charts ===
Chart (1990–1991)	Peak position
Canada Country Singles (RPM)	1
US Hot Country Songs (Billboard)	2

=== Year-end charts ===
Chart (1991)	Position
Canada Country Tracks (RPM)	47
US Country Songs (Billboard)	37
