= Pretty Little Poison =

2023 single by Warren Zeiders

Single by Warren Zeiders

from the album Pretty Little Poison
- Released: July 10, 2023
- Genre: Country
- Length: 3:38
- Label: Warner
- Songwriters: Warren Zeiders; Ryan Beaver; Jared Keim
- Producer: Ross Copperman

Warren Zeiders singles chronology
"West Texas Weather" (2023)	"Pretty Little Poison" (2023)	"Sin So Sweet" (2023)

Music video
- "Pretty Little Poison" on YouTube

"Pretty Little Poison" is a song by American country music singer Warren Zeiders, released on July 10, 2023 as the second single from his third studio album of the same name (2023). It was written by Zeiders, Ryan Beaver and Jared Keim and produced by Ross Copperman.

== Background ==
Warren Zeiders said about the song, "This is my favorite song that I've ever written. Like a moth to a flame, this song is about being led into temptation between love and toxicity. Choosing something or someone that we ultimately know will hurt us in the end."

== Composition ==
"Pretty Little Poison" features guitar riffs, while lyrically, Zeiders describes being easily swayed by his momentary lover and old memories, letting his heart rule his head. He compares his passion to the feeling of being addicted to a drug.

== Commercial performance ==
"Pretty Little Poison" reached number one on the Billboard Country Airplay chart dated March 2, 2024, becoming Zeiders's first number one single, and the first debut single to top the chart since Nate Smith's "Whiskey on You" thirteen months earlier. Coincidentally, the song dethroned Smith's "World on Fire" at the top after the latter song spent ten consecutive weeks there.

== Charts ==
=== Weekly charts ===
Chart performance for "Pretty Little Poison"
Chart (2023–2024)	Peak position
Canada (Canadian Hot 100)	69
Canada Country (Billboard)	17
UK Country Airplay (Radiomonitor)	3
US Billboard Hot 100	19
US Country Airplay (Billboard)	1
US Hot Country Songs (Billboard)	5

=== Year-end charts ===
2023 year-end chart performance for "Pretty Little Poison"
Chart (2023)	Position
US Hot Country Songs (Billboard)	60

2024 year-end chart performance for "Pretty Little Poison"
Chart (2024)	Position
US Billboard Hot 100	60
US Country Airplay (Billboard)	3
US Hot Country Songs (Billboard)	16

== Certifications ==
Certifications for "Pretty Little Poison"
Region	Certification	Certified units/sales
Canada (Music Canada)	4× Platinum	320,000^{‡}
New Zealand (RMNZ)	Gold	15,000^{‡}
United States (RIAA)	2× Platinum	2,000,000^{‡}
^{‡} Sales+streaming figures based on certification alone.
