= Warren Zeiders =

American country musician

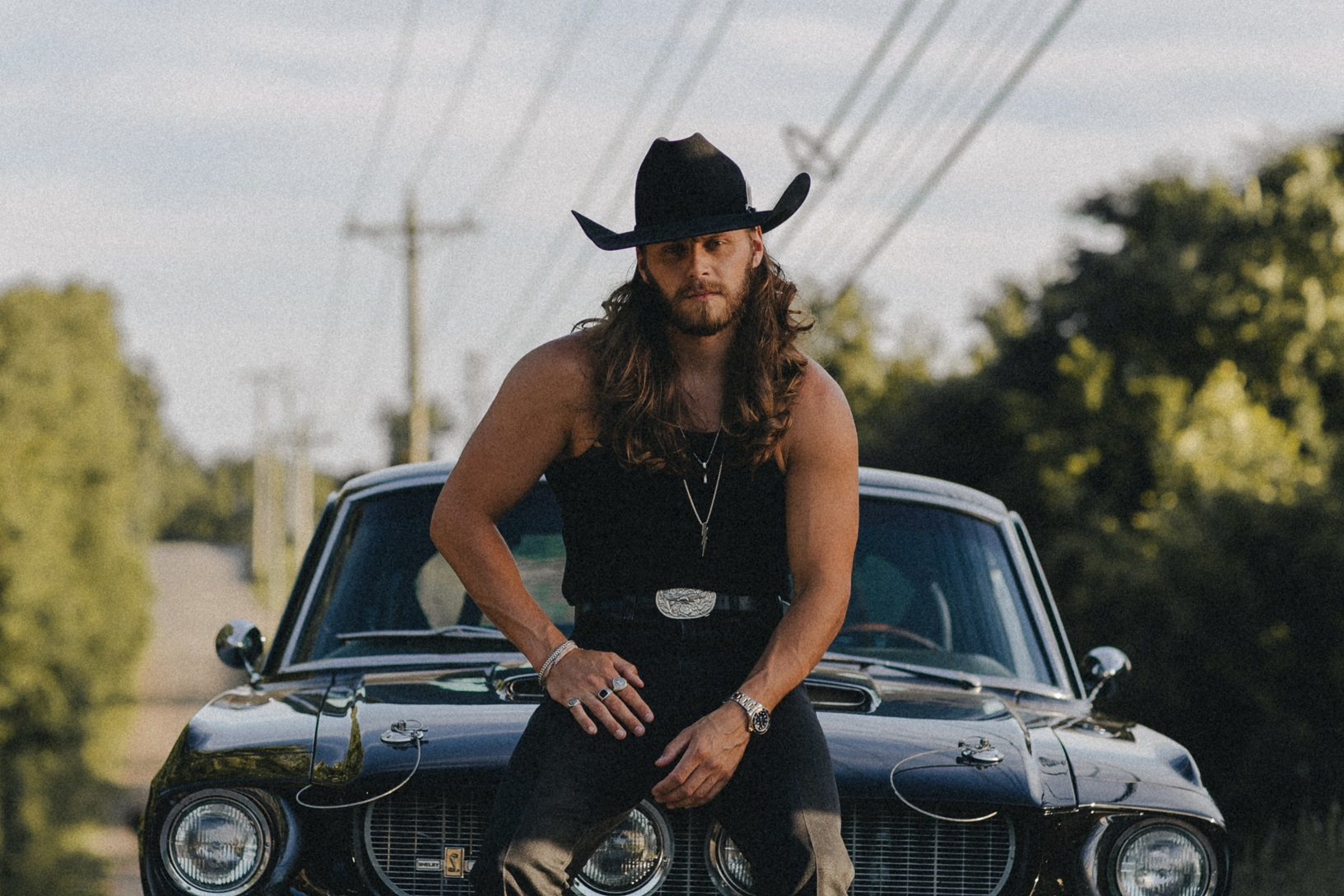
- Zeiders in 2024

Background information
- Born: Warren Donald Zeiders; May 6, 1999 (age 27); Hershey, Pennsylvania, U.S.
- Genre: Country
- Occupation: Singer-songwriter
- Instrument: Vocals
- Years active: 2021–present
- Label: Warner
- Website: warrenzeiders.com

Warren Donald Zeiders (born May 6, 1999) is an American country music singer and songwriter. He has released five studio albums under Warner Records: Acoustic Covers (2021), 717 Tapes the Album (2022), Pretty Little Poison (2023), Relapse (2024) and No Brakes (2026). He had his first number one hit on country radio with his single "Pretty Little Poison" (2023).

== Career ==
Zeiders studied business at Frostburg State University in Frostburg, Maryland where he also recorded and posted covers on TikTok. He began co-writing and singing original songs including "Ride the Lightning", which has over 500 million views on TikTok.

=== 2021–2022: Acoustic Covers and 717 Tapes the Album ===
Zeiders released his debut album, Acoustic Covers on August 6, 2021. The deluxe edition includes his cover of the single "Outskirts of Heaven" featuring Craig Campbell, who originally sang the track. The album contains covers of songs by Tyler Childers, Afroman, and Lynyrd Skynyrd, among others. In 2022, Zeiders signed with Warner Records and re-released "Ride the Lightning", which debuted at number 30 on the Billboard Hot Country Songs chart. The song was certified platinum in both the United States and Canada. In 2021 and 2022, he released two EP's titled 717 Tapes and 717 Tapes, Vol II, which were eventually combined into his second album release, 717 Tapes the Album.

=== 2023–2025: Pretty Little Poison and Relapse, Lies, and Betrayal ===
"Pretty Little Poison" was released as Zeiders' country radio debut single on July 10, 2023, and became his first number one hit in February 2024. His third studio album of the same name was released on August 10, 2023. On November 17, 2023, he released "Sin So Sweet" as a single to be included on the deluxe edition of Pretty Little Poison. "Heartbreaker", the second single from the deluxe edition of Pretty Little Poison, was released on February 2, 2024. It peaked at 41 on the U.S. Country Songs Billboard chart. Pretty Little Poison (Deluxe Edition) was released two weeks later on February 16. 2024.

In May 2024, Zeiders released "Betrayal", the first promotional single from his fourth studio album. An a cappella version and an instrumental version were included with the release. On June 7, 2024, he released "Relapse", along with an a cappella and instrumental version, as the lead single from his upcoming fourth studio album. In July 2024, Zeiders announced his fourth studio album, Relapse, which was released on August 23, 2024. Zeiders was invited to record a song for Twisters: The Album, and his song "The Cards I've Been Dealt" was released on July 19, 2024. Two more promotional singles, "Addictions" and "Intoxicated", were released from Relapse, prior to the album's release.

In October 2024, Zeiders released "You for a Reason" as his first release since Relapse. On January 10, 2025, he released "Can a Heart Take" alongside his announcement of the deluxe version of Relapse entitled, Relapse, Lies, & Betrayal. A double album, it was released on March 14, 2025. On February 21, 2025, he released the third promotional single from the deluxe edition, "Without You".

=== 2025–present: No Brakes and Live from the 717 ===
On September 2, 2025, Zeiders announced the song "Only Bible". It was released on September 12, 2025. On October 31, 2025, Zeiders released a cover of "How Great Thou Art". Zeiders released his first live album Live from the 717 on January 30, 2026. On February 27, 2026, Zeiders released the song "Born to Be Yours".

On July 17, 2026, Zeiders announced his fifth album No Brakes and released the title track. The album was released on September 25, 2026.

== Discography ==
=== Studio albums ===
List of studio albums
Title	Details	Peak chart positions				Certifications
Title	Details	US	US Country	AUS	CAN	Certifications
Acoustic Covers	Released: August 8, 2021; Label: Warner Records	—	—	—	—	
717 Tapes the Album	Released: September 19, 2022; Label: Warner Records	—	—	—	—	MC: Platinum
Pretty Little Poison	Released: August 18, 2023; Label: Warner Records	59	12	—	80	RIAA: Gold; MC: Platinum
Relapse	Released: August 23, 2024; Label: Warner Records	63	12	57	65	MC: Gold
No Brakes	Released: September 25, 2026; Label: Warner Records	—	—	—	—	
"—" denotes releases that did not chart

=== Live albums ===
Title	Details	Certifications
Live from the 717	Released: January 30, 2026; Label: Warner Records	MC: 2× Platinum

=== EPs ===
List of extended plays
Title	Details
717 Tapes	Released: October 22, 2021; Label: Warner Records
717 Tapes Vol. II	Released: April 22, 2022; Label: Warner Records

=== Singles ===
List of singles, with selected chart positions and certifications
Title	Year	Peak positions						Certifications	Album
Title	Year	US	US Country Songs	US Country Airplay	CAN	CAN Country	NZ Hot	Certifications	Album
"Ride the Lightning (717 Tapes)"	2021	—	30	—	—	—	—	RIAA: Platinum; MC: 3× Platinum; RMNZ: Gold	717 Tapes
"Pretty Little Poison"	2023	19	5	1	69	17	—	RIAA: 2× Platinum; MC: 4× Platinum; RMNZ: Gold	Pretty Little Poison
"Relapse"	2024	— (Note: "Relapse" did not enter the Billboard Hot 100, but peaked at number four on the Bubbling Under Hot 100 Singles chart.)	30	33	—	—	—	MC: 2× Platinum	Relapse
"Overrated" (featuring Bellah Mae)	2026	—	41	58	—	—	40		No Brakes
"—" denotes releases that did not chart

=== Promotional singles ===
List of other charted songs, with selected chart positions
Title	Year	Peak positions		Certifications	Album
Title	Year	US Country Songs	NZ Hot	Certifications	Album
"Ride It Hard" (featuring Sueco)	2022	—	—		Non-album single
"One Hell of an Angel"	2022	—	—		717 Tapes the Album
"West Texas Weather"	2023	—	—		Pretty Little Poison
"Sin So Sweet"	2023	39	—	MC: Platinum	Pretty Little Poison (Deluxe Edition)
"Addictions"	2024	—	—		Relapse
"You for a Reason"	2024	39	33	MC: Gold	Relapse, Lies, & Betrayal
"Can a Heart Take"	2025	—	18		Relapse, Lies, & Betrayal
"Without You"	2025	—	32		Relapse, Lies, & Betrayal
"Love in Letting Go" (with Lanie Gardner)	2025	44	36		Relapse, Lies, & Betrayal
"Born to Be Yours"	2026	—	—		Non-album single
"Drinking Game"	2026	—	—		No Brakes
"—" denotes releases that did not chart

=== Other charted and certified songs ===
List of other charted songs, with selected chart positions and certifications
Title	Year	Peak positions		Certifications	Album
Title	Year	US Country Songs	NZ Hot	Certifications	Album
"Never Look Back"	2022	—	—	MC: Gold	717 Tapes the Album
"Dark Night"	2022	—	—	MC: Platinum	717 Tapes the Album
"Up to No Good"	2022	—	—	MC: Platinum	717 Tapes the Album
"Weeping Willow"	2023	—	—	MC: Gold	Pretty Little Poison
"Heartbreaker"	2024	41	—	ARIA: Gold; MC: Platinum	Pretty Little Poison (Deluxe Edition)
"Betrayal"	2024	41	31		Relapse
"Intoxicated"	2024	—	36	MC: Gold	Relapse
"—" denotes releases that did not chart

== Tours ==
Headlining

- Up To No Good Tour (2022)
- Pretty Little Poison Tour (2023–24)
- Relapse, Lies, and Betrayal Tour (2024–25)

Supporting

- Beautifully Broken Tour (2024) with Jelly Roll
