= Solid Ground (Rob Crosby album) =

Studio album by Rob Crosby
- Released: January 8, 1991
- Studios: OmniSound Studios, Midtown Tone and Volume, Martin Recording Co. and The Castle (Nashville, Tennessee)
- Genre: Country
- Length: 31:52
- Label: Arista Nashville
- Producer: Scott Hendricks

Rob Crosby chronology
Rob Crosby (1979)	Solid Ground (1991)	Another Time and Place (1992)

Singles from Solid Ground
- 1. "Love Will Bring Her Around" Released: October 1990; 2. "She's a Natural" Released: March 1991; 3. "Still Burnin' for You" Released: August 1991; 4. "Working Woman" Released: January 1992

Solid Ground is the second studio album by American country music singer Rob Crosby. It was released on January 8, 1991 via Arista Nashville. The album includes the singles "Love Will Bring Her Around", "She's a Natural", "Still Burnin' for You", and "Working Woman".

== Critical reception ==
Giving it a "C", Alanna Nash of Entertainment Weekly thought that the songs were mostly derivative of Lee Greenwood and the Desert Rose Band.

== Track listing ==
All tracks written or co-written by Rob Crosby. Co-writers are named in parentheses.

No.	Title	Writer(s)	Length
1.	"Love Will Bring Her Around"	Will Robinson	2:40
2.	"Working Woman"	Robinson, Tim DuBois	3:04
3.	"She's a Natural"	Rick Bowles	3:18
4.	"Solid Ground"	Gary Burr	3:28
5.	"The Woman in You"		3:41
6.	"Still Burnin' for You"		3:08
7.	"Somewhere Down the Line"	Thom McHugh	3:04
8.	"Good Ain't Good Enough"		2:41
9.	"(Nobody's Gonna) Hurt My Heart"	Craig Karp	3:37
10.	"Once in a While"	Karp	3:23

== Personnel ==
- Rob Crosby – lead vocals, backing vocals (1–8, 10), acoustic guitar
- Dennis Burnside – acoustic piano
- Mike Lawler – synthesizers (2–5, 8, 10)
- Jeff Boggs – Synclavier (8)
- Michael Severs – electric guitar (1–3, 5–10), mandolin (4)
- Greg Jennings – low-string guitar (1), hi-string guitar (3, 10), mandolin (7), electric guitar (8, 9)
- Pat Severs – steel guitar
- Paul Franklin – sitbro (7), pedabro (9)
- Scott Kinsey – bass guitar (1, 6, 8)
- Willie Weeks – bass guitar (2–5, 7, 9, 10)
- Harry Stinson – drums, backing vocals (1, 6)
- Terry McMillan – percussion (2–5, 7, 9, 10)
- The Leonard Moon Singers (Jim Dittrich, Paul Gregg and Greg Jennings) – backing vocals (2, 8)
- Rick Bowles – backing vocals (3, 10)
- Gary Burr – backing vocals (4)
- Carol Chase – backing vocals (9)
- Jonell Mosser – backing vocals (9)

== Production ==
- Tim DuBois – executive producer
- Scott Hendricks – producer, mixing, additional recording
- Chris Hammond – recording, additional recording, assistant engineer
- Jim DeMain – additional recording, assistant engineer
- Chris Armstrong – assistant engineer
- Steve Bishir – assistant engineer
- Jeff Boggs – assistant engineer
- Mark Nevers – assistant engineer
- Carry Summers – assistant engineer
- Hank Williams – mastering at MasterMix (Nashville, Tennessee)
- Maude Gilman – art direction
- Jim "Señor" McGuire – photography
- Steve Small for Small Time Management – management

== Chart performance ==
=== Album ===
Chart (1991)	Peak position
U.S. Top Country Albums	74

=== Singles ===
Year	Single	Peak chart positions	
Year	Single	US Country	CAN Country
1990	"Love Will Bring Her Around"	12	10
1991	"She's a Natural"	15	10
1991	"Still Burnin' for You"	20	25
1992	"Working Woman"	28	29
