= Rob Crosby =

American singer-songwriter

- Born: Robert Crosby Hoar; April 25, 1954 (age 72)
- Origin: Sumter, South Carolina, United States
- Genre: Country
- Occupation: Singer-songwriter
- Instruments: Vocals, guitar
- Years active: 1979–present
- Label: Guru; Southern Tracks; Arista Nashville; River North; CSC
- Website: robcrosby.com

Rob Crosby (born Robert Crosby Hoar; April 25, 1954) is an American country music singer and songwriter. Between 1990 and 1996, Rob charted eight singles on the U.S. Billboard Hot Country Singles & Tracks charts. He has also recorded six studio albums, with his most recent, Catfish Day, being released in 2007. He also co-wrote Eric Paslay's 2014 single "Friday Night", The Common Linnets' 2014 single "Calm After the Storm", Martina McBride's 2003 single "Concrete Angel", Andy Griggs' 2000 single "She's More" and Lee Greenwood's 1990 single "Holdin' a Good Hand" and has written songs for Luke Combs, Lady Antebellum, Carl Perkins, Paul Simon, Brooks & Dunn, Restless Heart, Blackhawk, Darryl Worley, Boy Howdy, Ty Herndon, Don Williams, Ilse DeLange, Trace Adkins, Lee Brice and more.

== Biography ==
=== Early life ===
Robert Crosby was born and raised in Sumter, South Carolina, graduating in the Sumter High School class of 1972. He wrote his first song when he was nine years old; by the time he started the fifth grade, he had his own band, The Radiations. During high school and college, he performed in South Carolina, and eventually across the Southeast. In 1984, Crosby moved to Nashville with his family and began playing in local clubs.

=== Songwriter ===
In 1984, an Atlanta businessman offered Crosby $700 a month for a cut in his future songwriting royalties. After getting a job as a staff writer, country music group Chance took his song "She Told Me Yes" to the top 30 in 1985. Since then, many songs written by Crosby have reached the Billboard top 10, including "Friday Night" by Eric Paslay, "Concrete Angel" by Martina McBride, "She's More" by Andy Griggs and "Holdin' a Good Hand" by Lee Greenwood. Crosby's songs have been recorded by Blackhawk, Brooks & Dunn, Ty Herndon, Paul Overstreet, Carl Perkins, Restless Heart, Ricochet, Paul Simon, The Wilkinsons and Darryl Worley, among others.

=== Music career ===
In the 1970s and '80s, Rob recorded music for independent labels: Guru Records and Southern Tracks Records. After a performance at a songwriter's night, Crosby was signed to Arista Nashville. The label released his debut album, Solid Ground, in 1991. The first three singles, "Love Will Bring Her Around," "She's a Natural" and "Still Burnin' for You," all reached the top 20 on Billboard's Hot Country Songs chart. But after two commercially unsuccessful albums, Crosby was dropped from Arista in 1993. In 1995, he signed with River North and released his third album, Starting Now. Both singles released from the project peaked outside of the top 60 on Billboard. The same year, he was offered a chance to join the country music band Burnin' Daylight (which featured former members of Southern Pacific and Exile); however, he decided to focus on his solo career instead.

Crosby returned to CSC Records in 2003 with One Light in the Dark, a collection of original songs. He has released two albums since, 2003's Time Is a Gypsy and 2007's Catfish Day.

In 2014, Rob joined dutch band 'The Common Linnets', together with his son Matthew. The band consisted of popular dutch singer/songwriters Ilse DeLange and Waylon. They released two successful albums. Ilse and Waylon contended in 2014's Euro Song Contest and finished second with a song Rob co-wrote "Calm After The Storm".

== Discography ==
=== Albums ===
Title	Album details	Peak positions
Title	Album details	US Country
Rob Crosby	Release date: 1979; Label: Guru Records	—
Solid Ground	Release date: January 8, 1991; Label: Arista Nashville	74
Another Time and Place	Release date: July 28, 1992; Label: Arista Nashville	—
Starting Now	Release date: September 26, 1995; Label: River North Records	—
One Light in the Dark	Release date: 2003; Label: CSC	—
Time Is a Gypsy	Release date: 2003; Label: CSC	—
Catfish Day	Release date: 2007; Label: CSC	—
"—" denotes releases that did not chart

=== Singles ===
Year	Single	Peak chart positions		Album
Year	Single	US Country	CAN Country	Album
1987	"Heart On The Run"	—	—	—N/a
1988	"This Is The Night"	—	—	—N/a
1990	"Love Will Bring Her Around"	12	10	Solid Ground
1991	"She's a Natural"	15	10	Solid Ground
1991	"Still Burnin' for You"	20	25	Solid Ground
1992	"Working Woman"	28	29	Solid Ground
1992	"She Wrote the Book"	53	73	Another Time and Place
1992	"In the Blood"	48	53	Another Time and Place
1995	"The Trouble with Love"	64	—	Starting Now
1996	"Lady's Man"	64	—	Starting Now
1996	"Fallin' In and Crawlin' Out"	—	—	Starting Now
"—" denotes releases that did not chart

=== Music videos ===
Year	Video	Director
1990	"Love Will Bring Her Around"	Jim May
1991	"She's a Natural"	Sylvie Jacquemin
1992	"She Wrote the Book"	Chris Rogers
1992	"In the Blood"	Michael Merriman
1995	"The Trouble with Love"	Chris Rogers

== Chart singles written by Rob Crosby ==
The following is a list of Rob Crosby compositions that were chart hits.

Year	Title	Artist	Peak chart positions		
Year	Title	Artist	US Country	US	CAN Country
1985	"She Told Me Yes"	Chance	30	—	—
1990	"Holdin' a Good Hand" co-written with Johnny Few	Lee Greenwood	2	—	2
1991	"She's a Natural" co-written with Rick Bowles	Crosby	15	—	10
1991	"Love Will Bring Her Around" co-written with Will Robinson	Crosby	12	—	10
1991	"Working Woman" co-written with Will Robinson and Tim DuBois	Crosby	28	—	29
1994	"She Should’ve Been Mine" co-written with Kent Blazy and Jim Dowell	Western Flyer	62	—	—
1999	"She's More" co-written with Liz Hengber	Andy Griggs	2	37	2
2002	"Concrete Angel" co-written with Stephanie Bentley	Martina McBride	5	47	—
2006	"Do We Still" co-written with Rockie Lynne and Will Rambeaux	Rockie Lynne	46	—	—
2009	"Til the Last Shot's Fired" co-written with Doug Johnson	Trace Adkins	50	105	—
2013	"Friday Night" co-written with Eric Paslay and Rose Falcon	Eric Paslay	2	47	—
2021	"Ride the Lightning (717 Tapes)" co-written with Eric Paslay and Warren Zeiders	Warren Zeiders	30	—	—
