= Eric Paslay =

American singer-songwriter

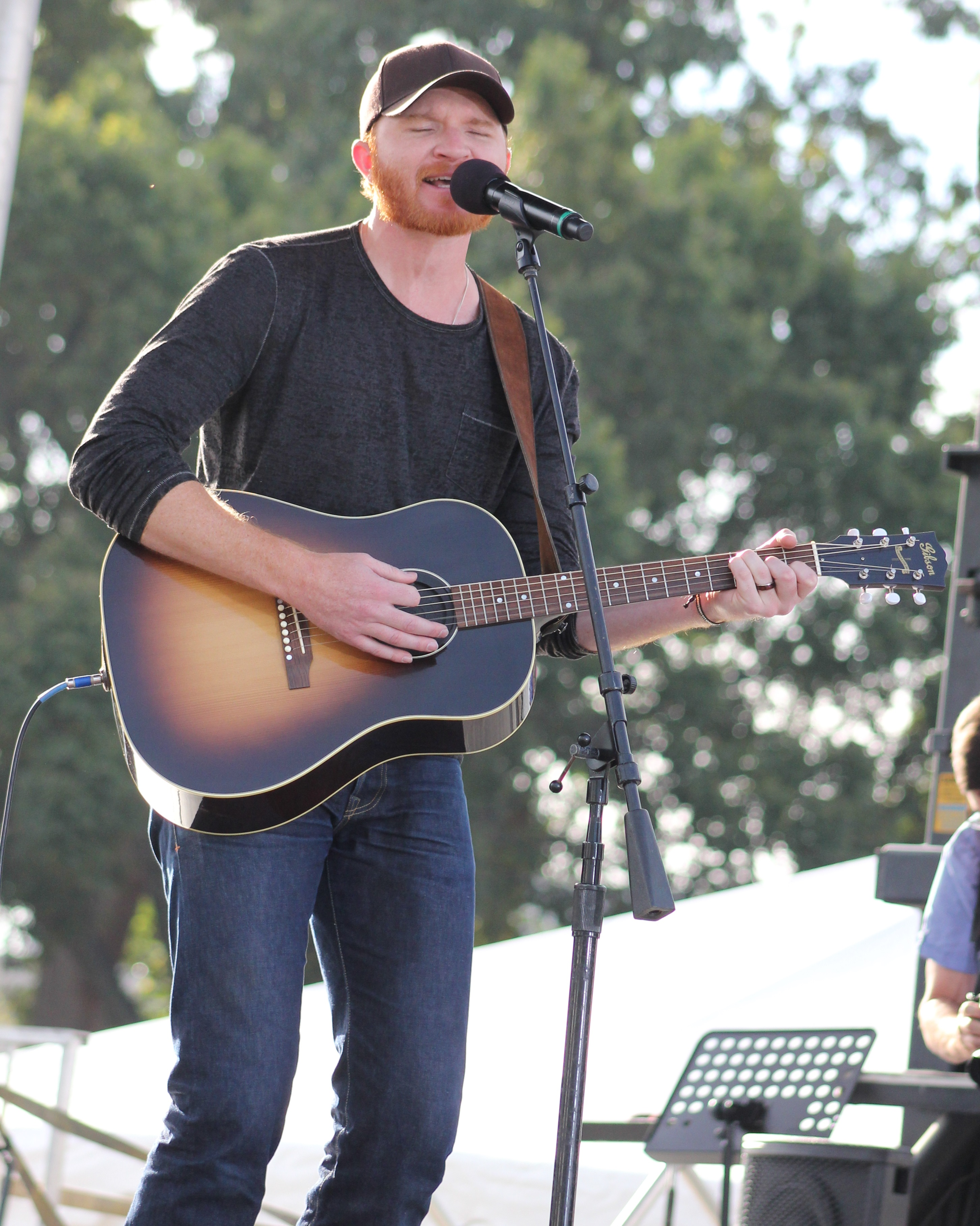
- Paslay performing in 2015

Background information
- Born: Eric Thomas Paslay; January 29, 1983 (age 43); Abilene, Texas, U.S.
- Origin: Waco, Texas, U.S. Temple, Texas, U.S.
- Genre: Country
- Occupation: Singer-songwriter
- Instruments: Vocals, guitar
- Years active: 2011–present
- Label: EMI Nashville

Eric Thomas Paslay (born January 29, 1983) is an American country music singer and songwriter. He has released one album for EMI Nashville, which contains the hit singles "Friday Night", "Song About a Girl", and "She Don't Love You". In addition to these, Paslay has written several hit singles for other artists, and has collaborated with Amy Grant, Dierks Bentley, Charles Kelley, among others.

== Early life ==
Eric Thomas Paslay was born in Abilene, Texas, and started playing guitar at the age of 15. He graduated from Middle Tennessee State University in the fall of 2005 with his Bachelor of Science degree.

== Career ==
In mid-2011, Paslay signed to EMI Records Nashville. After his first two singles "Never Really Wanted" and "If the Fish Don't Bite" failed to make top 40, his third, "Friday Night", was a Top 5 hit on Country Airplay in early 2014. The song was originally recorded by Lady Antebellum, and Paslay's version appears on his self-titled debut album, released in early 2014. The album went on to produce two more singles in "Song About a Girl" and "She Don't Love You".

He also co-wrote Jake Owen's "Barefoot Blue Jean Night", the Will Hoge/Eli Young Band song "Even If It Breaks Your Heart", and Love and Theft's "Angel Eyes" all of which were number 1 singles on the country charts. He has written album cuts for Lady Antebellum, Rascal Flatts' 2014 single "Rewind" and Keith Urban's 2021 single "Wild Hearts".

In 2013, Paslay appeared on Amy Grant's album How Mercy Looks from Here, sharing lead vocals with Grant and Sheryl Crow on a song he wrote called "Deep As It Is Wide". In publicity for the album, Grant stated that she is most excited about Paslay as an up-and-coming artist.

Paslay is featured alongside Dierks Bentley on Charles Kelley's debut solo single "The Driver" which was released on September 28, 2015. "The Driver" received a Grammy nomination for Best Country Duo/Group Performance for the 58th Annual Grammy Awards. This is Paslay's first Grammy nomination as a recording artist.

In October 2015, Paslay released "High Class" as the lead single to his upcoming second studio album. The album's second single, "Angels in This Town", released to country radio on July 18, 2016.

Paslay released a five-song digital extended play, The Work Tapes, in July 2017. Paslay parted ways with EMI Records Nashville in September 2018.

== Personal life ==
On April 26, 2015, Paslay married Natalie Harker. On December 8, 2018, they had their first daughter, Piper Lily Paslay.

Paslay has type 1 diabetes.

== Discography ==
Eric Paslay discography
- Studio albums: 2
- Extended plays: 1
- Singles: 10 (8 Solo & 2 As A Featured Artist)
- Music videos: 5

=== Studio albums ===
Title	Details	Peak positions		Sales
Title	Details	US Country	US	Sales
Eric Paslay	Release date: February 4, 2014; Label: EMI Nashville	4	31	US: 54,300
Nice Guy	Release date: August 14, 2020; Label: Paso Fino	—	—	
"—" denotes releases that did not chart

=== Extended plays ===
Title	Album details
The Work Tapes	Release date: July 28, 2017; Label: EMI Nashville

=== Singles ===
Single	Year	Peak positions					Certifications	Sales	Album
Single	Year	US Country Songs	US Country Airplay	US	CAN Country	CAN	Certifications	Sales	Album
"Never Really Wanted"	2011	48		—	—	—			Eric Paslay
"If the Fish Don't Bite"	2012	58		—	—	—			Non-album single
"Friday Night"	2013	6	2	47	8	53	US: Gold	US: 504,000	Eric Paslay
"Song About a Girl"	2014	18	12	85	25	—		US: 215,000	Eric Paslay
"She Don't Love You"	2014	15	14	77	28	—		US: 389,000	Eric Paslay
"High Class"	2015	32	32	—	—	—		US: 64,000	Dressed in Black (unreleased)
"Angels in This Town"	2016	—	—	—	—	—			Dressed in Black (unreleased)
"Young Forever"	2018	—	41	—	—	—			Non-album single
"—" denotes releases that did not chart

==== As a featured artist ====
Single	Year	Peak positions		Album
Single	Year	US Country Songs	US Country Airplay	Album
"The Driver" (Charles Kelley featuring Dierks Bentley and Eric Paslay)	2015	37	44	The Driver
"My House" (The Scott Brothers featuring Eric Paslay)	2017	—	—	Non-album single
"—" denotes releases that did not chart

=== Music videos ===
Video	Year	Director
"Friday Night"	2013	Mason Dixon
"Song About a Girl"	2014	Wes Edwards
"She Don't Love You"	2015	Wes Edwards
"The Driver" (Charles Kelley featuring Dierks Bentley and Eric Paslay)	2015	TK McKamy
"High Class"	2016	Wes Edwards

== Awards and nominations ==
Year	Awards	Award	Outcome
2016	Grammy Awards	Best Country Duo/Group Performance – "The Driver" (Charles Kelley featuring Dierks Bentley and Eric Paslay)	Nominated
