= Change =

Change, Changed or Changing may refer to the below. Other forms are listed at § See also

== Alteration ==
- Impermanence, a difference in a state of affairs at different points in time
- Menopause, also referred to as "the change", the permanent cessation of the menstrual period
- Metamorphosis, or change, a biological process by which an animal physically develops after birth or hatching
- Personal development, or personal change, activities that improve awareness and identity
- Social change, an alteration in the social order of a society
- Technological change, invention, innovation, and diffusion of technology

== Organizations and politics ==
- Change (manifesto), a 2024 political manifesto for the United Kingdom Labour Party
- Change 2011, a Finnish political party
- Change We Need, a slogan for Barack Obama's 2008 presidential campaign
- Change.gov, the transition website for the incoming Obama administration in 2008–2009
- Change.org, a petition website operated by Change.org, Inc.
- Communities Helping All Neighbors Gain Empowerment (CHANGE), a civic organization based in Winston-Salem, North Carolina
- Movement for Change, an Iraqi Kurdish political party
- Der Wandel, (The Change), a left-wing political party in Austria
- Cambio 21 (Change 21), a political party in Peru
- We Continue the Change, a political party in Bulgaria
- Change (Poland), a political party in Poland
- Change, a common signpost for a bureau de change

== Places ==
- Change, Nepal
- Change, Saône-et-Loire, France
- Change Islands, Newfoundland and Labrador
- Le Change, Dordogne, France

== Science ==
- Fold change, in statistics
- Relative change, in quantitative sciences

== Art, entertainment, and media ==
=== Literature ===
- I Ching, a Chinese classic text also known as the Classic of Changes, and Book of Changes
- The Change (Animorphs), a book in the Animorphs series, written by K.A. Applegate
- The Change, an alternative name for The Emberverse series as well as a fictional event in that series

=== Music ===
==== Groups ====
- Change (band), an Italian-American post-disco group active in the 1980s
- The Change (band), a former band associated with English duo Myles and Connor
- Jimmy and the Soulblazers also known as Change, an American R&B group active in the 1970s

==== Albums ====
- Change (The Alarm album), 1989
- Change (Vanessa Amorosi album), 2002
- Change (Jason Chan album), 2008
- Change (Chick Corea album), 1999
- Change (The Dismemberment Plan album), 2001
- Change (Every Little Thing album), 2010
- Change (Andrew Hill album), 2007
- Change (Derrick Hoh album), 2010
- Change (Richie Kotzen album), 2003
- Change (Pink Cream 69 album), 1995
- Change (Sons of the Desert album), 2000
- Change (Sugababes album), 2007
- Change (Cindy Wilson album), 2017
- Change by Barry White, 1982
- Change (Ray Wilson album), 2003
- Change, by Bakithi Kumalo
- Change!, by the Black Swans
- Changed (album), by Rascal Flatts
- The Change (album), by Marie Fredriksson

==== Songs ====
- "Change" (Charlie Puth song)
- "Change" (Christina Aguilera song)
- "Change" (Daniel Merriweather song)
- "Change" (Every Little Thing song)
- "Change" (Hotel FM song)
- "Change" (Hyuna song)
- "Change" (John Waite song)
- "Change" (Killing Joke song)
- "Change" (Kimberley Locke song)
- "Change" (Lisa Stansfield song)
- "Change" (Miho Fukuhara song)
- "Change" (Miwa song)
- "Change" (Pale Waves song)
- "Change" (Sugababes song)
- "Change" (Taylor Swift song)
- "Change" (Tears for Fears song)
- "Change" (NF song)
- "Change", by Axium from Matter of Time
- "Change", by Banks from Goddess
- "Changed", by Bazzi from Cosmic
- "Change", by Black Stone Cherry from Between the Devil & the Deep Blue Sea
- "Change", by Blind Melon from Blind Melon
- "Change", by Bobby Darin from Bobby Darin Born Walden Robert Cassotto
- "Change", by Candlebox
- "Change", by Carrie Underwood from Play On
- "Change", by Churchill
- "Change", by Conor & Jay from the Grand Theft Auto III soundtrack
- "Change", by Crazy Town from Darkhorse
- "Change", by Fishbone from Truth and Soul
- "Change", by (G)I-dle from I Love
- "Change", by Lana Del Rey from Lust for Life
- "Change", by Jeff Liu and Rebecca Sugar, in Steven Universe: The Movie
- "Change", by Joy, 2018
- "Change", by Ken Carson from Project X
- "Change", by King Gizzard and the Lizard Wizard from Changes
- "Chang'e", by King Gizzard & the Lizard Wizard from The Silver Cord
- "Change", by the Lightning Seeds from Jollification
- "Change", by Oingo Boingo from Boingo
- "Change", by RM, featuring Wale
- "Change", by Salvador Sobral from Excuse Me
- "Change", by Sean Kingston from Sean Kingston
- "Change", by Sparks from Music That You Can Dance To
- "Change", by Staind from Break the Cycle
- "Change", by Steve Porcaro, originally for Michael Jackson, from The Very Day, 2025
- "Change", by Tess Gaerthé
- "Change", by T-Pain from Three Ringz
- "Change", by Tracy Chapman from Where You Live
- "Change", by White Lies from Big TV
- "Change (In the House of Flies)", by Deftones
- "Change (Part 1)", by Australian band Karnivool from the album Themata
- "Change (Part 2)", by Australian band Karnivool from Sound Awake
- "Changed", by Polvo from Siberia
- "Changed" (Rascal Flatts song)
- "Changing" (Conrad Sewell song), 2018
- "Changing" (Kevin Jonas song)
- "Changing" (Sigma song), 2011
- "Changing", by the Airborne Toxic Event from All at Once
- "Changing", by Magic featuring Tony Burrows, 1976
- "Changing", a non-album B-side by The Searchers, 1981
- "The Change" (song), by Garth Brooks
- "The Change", by Evanescence from Evanescence, 2011
- "The Change", by What So Not and DMA's, 2021

=== Television ===
- Change (Armenian TV series), a 2016 Armenian sitcom
- Change (Japanese TV series), a 2008 Japanese television drama
- "Change" (Spaced), a 2001 television episode
- "Changing" (Supergirl), a season 2 episode of Supergirl
- The Change (TV series), a 2023 British comedy drama series
- "The Changing", a 2001 episode of Wolf Lake

=== Other uses in arts, entertainment, and media ===
- Change (film), a 2010 Italian film
- Change: The Magazine of Higher Learning, a journal published for the Carnegie Foundation for the Advancement of Teaching by Heldref Publications
- The Change (radio show), a British radio programme

== Other uses ==
- Coins, also known as change or pocket change

== See also ==
- Becoming (philosophy)
- Chang'e (disambiguation)
- Changer (disambiguation)
- Changes (disambiguation)
- Chump Change (disambiguation)
- No Change (disambiguation)
- Small change (disambiguation)
- Variation (disambiguation)
- Transition (disambiguation), broadly synonymous in many spheres
