= Chang =

Chang may refer to:

== People ==
=== Surname ===
- Chang (surname), the romanization of several separate Chinese surnames
- Chang or Jang (Korean name), romanizations of the Korean surname 장

=== Given name ===
- Chang Bunker (昌) (1811–1874), one of the original Siamese twins
- Liu Chang (disambiguation)
- Chang, the younger brother in the children's book Tikki Tikki Tembo
- Chang (Star Trek), a Klingon general from the film Star Trek VI: The Undiscovered Country
- Chang Koehan, a Korean character from The King of Fighters
- Benjamin Chang, a Chinese character from Community
- Chang Wen, person who was responsible for 2025 Taipei stabbings

=== Pseudonym ===
- Chang (director) (born Yoon Hong-seung, 1975), a South Korean film director

== Ethnography ==
- Chang Naga, a tribe of Tuensang in Nagaland, India
- Chang language, spoken by the Chang Naga

== Places ==
- Chang, Bhiwani, a village in the Indian state of Haryana
- Chang, Iran, a village in Hormozgan Province of Iran

== Other uses ==
- Chang, chaang, or chhaang, a traditional alcoholic barley drink of Tibet
- Chang (Thai beer), a Thai brand of beer by ThaiBev
- Chang: A Drama of the Wilderness, a 1927 film
- Chang (roller coaster), a roller coaster formerly at Kentucky Kingdom
- Chang (instrument), a Persian harp
- Chang (creature), the ghost of a person eaten by a tiger in ancient Chinese legend
- Chang, or Chinese chang, an alternative name for the fangxiang, a type of metallophone
- Chang Arena, a football stadium in Buriram, Thailand
- Chang Himal, a mountain in Nepal
- Chang number in mathematics
- Chang or zhàng, a Chinese customary unit of length
- Chang dance, a folk dance in India
- Chang International Circuit, a motorsport race track in Buriram, Thailand

== See also ==
- Chang'e (disambiguation)
