= Changping (disambiguation) =

Changping is a district of Beijing, China

Changping or Chang Ping may also refer to refer to:

== Transportation ==
- Changping station (Beijing Subway) (昌平), a subway station on Changping line of Beijing Subway. Located in Beijing.
- Changping line (昌平线), a subway line of Beijing Subway
- Changping railway station (Beijing) (昌平), a railway station in Beijing.
- Changping railway station (Guangdong) (常平), a railway station in Dongguan, Guangdong province.
- Changping station (Guangzhou Metro) (长平), a metro station on Line 21 of Guangzhou Metro. Located in Guangzhou, Guangdong province.

== People ==
- Lord Changping (昌平君; died 223 BC), the last king of Chu
- Princess Changping (長平公主; 1629–1646), princess of the Ming Dynasty
- Chang Ping (長平)

== Places ==
Towns

- Changping, Guangdong (常平镇), town in and subdivision of Dongguan, Guangdong
- Changping, Hubei (长坪镇), town in and subdivision of Nanzhang County, Hubei
- Changping, Nanbu County (长坪镇), town in subdivision of Nanbu County, Sichuan

Townships

- Changping Township, Fusui County (昌平乡), Guangxi
- Changping Township, Henan (常平乡), subdivision of Qinyang, Henan

Written as "长坪乡"

- Changping Township, Chongqing, subdivision of Wanzhou District, Chongqing
- Changping Township, Guizhou, subdivision of Songtao County, Guizhou
- Changping Township, Leiyang, subdivision of Leiyang City, Hunan.
- Changping Township, Jiangxi, subdivision of Jinggangshan City, Jiangxi
- Changping Township, Sichuan, subdivision of Tongjiang County, Sichuan
- Changping Yao Ethnic Township, Mengshan County, Guangxi

== Other uses ==
- Battle of Changping (長平之戰), campaign of the Warring States Period of China

== See also ==
- Chang (disambiguation)
- Ping (disambiguation)
- Pingchang (disambiguation)
