= Baiguo railway station =

Baiguo railway station may refer to:

- Baiguo railway station (Hubei), on the Yichang−Wanzhou Railway in Hubei, China
- Baiguo railway station (Sichuan), on the Chengdu-Kunming Railway in Yuexi County, Sichuan, China
