= Shisanling (disambiguation) =

Shisanling is a collection of tombs in Changping District, Beijing, commonly known as the Ming Tombs in English.

Shisanling may also refer to:

- Shisanling Town, a town of Changping District, Beijing, where the tombs are located
- Shisanling Reservoir, a large reservoir in Shisanling Town near the tombs, also known as Ming Tombs Reservoir
- Shisanling Pumped Storage Power Station, a pumped-storage power station located at the reservoir
- Ming Tombs station, a station on the Changping Line of the Beijing Subway, also known as Shisanling Jinqu in Chinese
