= 平昌 =

平昌 may refer to:

- Pingchang (disambiguation)
  - Pingchang County
- Pyeongchang (disambiguation) (평창)
  - Pyeongchang-gun

== See also ==
- The dictionary definition of 平 at Wiktionary
- The dictionary definition of 昌 at Wiktionary
