= Pingchang (disambiguation) =

Pingchang or Ping Chang may refer to:

== Places ==
- Pingchang County (simplified Chinese: 平昌县; traditional Chinese: 平昌縣; pinyin: Píng-Chāng-xiàn), Bazhong Prefecture, Sichuan Province, China
- Pingchang Town (simplified Chinese: 平昌镇; traditional Chinese: 平昌鎮; pinyin: Píng-Chāng-zhèn), Pingqiao District, Xinyang Prefecture, Henan Province, China; see List of township-level divisions of Henan
- Pingchang Commandery (Chinese: 平昌; pinyin: Píng-Chāng), Dingyang, Jin Dynasty; former name of Jiexiu, Jinzhong, Shanxi, China; see Jiexiu
- Pingchang Village (Chinese: 平昌里; pinyin: Píng-Chāng-lǐ), Beitun District, Taichung, Taiwan; see Beitun District
- Pingchang Station, a rail station on Line 6 (Chongqing Rail Transit)

== People ==
- Chang Ping (simplified Chinese: 长平; traditional Chinese: 長平; pinyin: Zhǎng Píng; HKGR: Chang Ping), given name "Ping", surname "Chang", so in Western name order is "Ping Chang"
- Empress Liu (Zhezong), with the title "Lady of Pingchang Commandery" (Chinese: 平昌郡君; pinyin: Píng-Chāng-jùn Jūn)
- Qifu Chipan, Duke of Pingchang, a prince of the Xianbei state Western Qin
- Princess of Pingchang, sister of Prince Regnant Anshiba of Western Qin, Qifu Mumo
- Princess of Pingchang (Chinese: 平昌公主; pinyin: Píng-Chāng gōngzhǔ), daughter of Emperor Xuanzong of Tang
- Prince of Pingchang, Fu Qing (died 355); failed usurper to his cousin, the Emperor Changsheng of Former Qin, Fu Sheng, and his uncle, the Emperor Jingming of Former Qin, Fu Jian (317–355)
- Earl of Pingchang, Meng Renzhi, son of Emperor Gaozu of Later Shu, Meng Zhixiang

== See also ==
- Ping (disambiguation)
- Chang (disambiguation)
- Pyeongchang (disambiguation) (Korean: 平昌)
- Changping (disambiguation)
