= Something Like This (disambiguation) =

Something Like This is the fourth studio album by Ben Rector.

Something Like This may also refer to:

- "Something Like This", a song by Scissor Sisters from the album Night Work (album)
- "Somethin' Like This", a song by Joe Diffie
- "Smthin Like This", a song by Bad Gyal from the mixtape Slow Wine Mixtape
- Kuchh Is Tara (lit. 'Something Like This'), a 2007 Indian TV series

== See also ==
- Something Just Like This, a song by the Chainsmokers and Coldplay
