= Changping railway station =

Changping railway station may refer to:

- Changping railway station (Guangdong) (常平), in Changping, Dongguan, China
- Changping railway station (Beijing) (昌平), in Changping District, Beijing
- Changping station (Beijing Subway), on the Changping Line, Beijing
