= Changping station =

Changping station can refer to:

- Changping station (Beijing Subway) (昌平), a subway station on Changping line of Beijing Subway
- Changping railway station (Beijing) (昌平), a railway station in Beijing
- Changping station (Dongguan Rail Transit) (昌平), a metro station on Line 1 of Dongguan Rail Transit
- Changping railway station (Guangdong) (常平), a railway station in Dongguan, Guangdong
- Changping station (Guangzhou Metro) (长平), a metro station on Line 21 of Guangzhou Metro
