= Changer =

Changer(s) may refer to:

== Literature ==
- Changer, a 1998 novel by Jane Lindskold
- Changers, a fictional species in the Culture series

== Music ==
- Changer (band), an Icelandic death metal/metalcore band
- "Changer", a song by Maître Gims from the 2013 album Subliminal

== Technology ==
- Automatic lamp changer, a device used to ensure that a navigational light stays lit even if a bulb burns out
- Frequency changer, an electronic or electromechanical device that converts alternating current of one frequency to alternating current of another frequency
- Gender changer, a hardware device placed between two cable connectors of the same type and gender
- Record changer, a device that plays several phonograph records in sequence without user intervention
- Tap changer, a mechanism in transformers that allows for variable turn ratios to be selected in distinct steps
- Voice changer, a device which can change the tone or pitch of or add distortion to the user's voice, or a combination and vary greatly in price and sophistication

== Other uses ==
- Money changer, a person or organization that exchanges coins or currency of one country for that of another
- Changer, a fictional device in the Super Sentai franchise

== See also ==
- Change (disambiguation)
