= Liu Chang =

Liu Chang may refer to:

- Liu Chang (Huainan) 刘长 (c.199–174 BC), son of Emperor Gaozu of Han
- Liu Chang (Southern Han) 劉鋹 (942–980), fourth and last emperor of the Southern Han
- Liu Chang (actor, born 1986) 刘畅, Chinese male actor and model.
- Liu Chang (tennis) 刘畅 (born 1990), Chinese tennis player
- Liu Chang (actor) 刘畅 (born 1993), Chinese male actor
- Chang Liu (synthetic biologist) 刘昌纯

== See also ==
- Liu Zhang (disambiguation), romanized as Liu Chang in Wade–Giles
