= Sons of the Desert (band) =

Country music band

- Sons of the Desert promotional image

Background information
- Origin: Waco, Texas, U.S.
- Genres: Country
- Years active: 1989–2004
- Labels: Epic; MCA Nashville
- Past members: Jim Beavers; Curtis Beck; Troy Von Haefen; Kyle Mathis; Doug Virden; Scott Saunders; Brian Westrum; Drew Womack; Mark Matejka; Tim Womack

Sons of the Desert was an American country music band founded in 1989 in Waco, Texas. Its most famous lineup consisted of brothers Drew Womack (lead vocals) and Tim Womack (lead guitar, background vocals), along with Scott Saunders (keyboards), Doug Virden (bass guitar, background vocals), and Brian Westrum (drums). The band released Whatever Comes First for Epic Records Nashville in 1997, and recorded a second album for Epic which was not released. Change followed in 2000. Counting two singles from the unreleased album, Sons of the Desert charted eight times on Billboard Hot Country Songs, including the top ten hit "Whatever Comes First"; they were also guest vocalists on Lee Ann Womack's 2000 hit "I Hope You Dance" and Ty Herndon's "It Must Be Love", both of which reached No. 1 on that chart. Following the band's disestablishment, Drew Womack became a solo artist; he would join Lonestar in 2021.

== Biography ==
The band, deriving its name from the 1933 Laurel and Hardy film Sons of the Desert, was founded in 1989 by a group of students attending McLennan Community College in Waco, Texas. The original members included Doug Virden, Jim Beavers, Troy Von Haefen, Kyle Mathis, and Curtis Beck. By 1994, the lineup had consisted of Doug Virden, Scott Saunders, Drew Womack, Brian Westrum, and guitarist Mark Matejka.

== First album ==
In 1997, Sons of the Desert signed to Epic Records' Nashville division. By this point, Drew's brother Tim had replaced Matejka as well. The band's debut album, Whatever Comes First, was released that year. Its title track served as the lead-off single, reaching a peak of No. 10 on Billboard Hot Country Singles & Tracks. The album's second and third singles, "Hand of Fate" and "Leaving October" (which Drew Womack wrote about his third-grade teacher), also reached top 40 on the same chart. Drew Womack and Virden also appeared as studio backing vocalists for other Epic Records artists, including Ty Herndon's 1996 album Living in a Moment and 1998 album Big Hopes, as well as Joe Diffie's 1997 album Twice Upon a Time. Drew Womack also wrote Kenny Chesney's 1997 single "She's Got It All".

== "Goodbye Earl" ==
Following the release of its first album, Sons of the Desert discovered a song called "Goodbye Earl", which they began to perform in concert. Written by Dennis Linde, "Goodbye Earl" told of a domestic abuse victim who enlisted a friend's help to kill her abusive husband. The group then recorded the song for a planned second album on Epic. Shortly thereafter, the Dixie Chicks (who were signed to Monument Records, which like Epic, was a division of Sony Music Entertainment), recorded the song, and they were planning to include it on their next album as well. Although both bands had planned to release their versions as singles, the Dixie Chicks claimed the song as their own. Their version was on their 1999 album Fly, and released as a single in 2000.

Sons of the Desert then entered a dispute with Sony over "Goodbye Earl", resulting in the band's departure from the label. Their second album for Epic was not released, and Sony acquired the rights to all of that album's songs (including the single "What About You", which had been released and peaked at number 45 on the country chart). Also included on this unreleased album was a recording of "Bless the Broken Road", a song which was previously a number 42 country single in 1997 for Melodie Crittenden, and would later become a No. 1 country hit when the group Rascal Flatts recorded it for their 2004 album Feels Like Today. "Albuquerque" was issued as the unreleased album's second single, peaking at No. 58. The band was also featured on Ty Herndon's 1998 hit "It Must Be Love".

== Switch to MCA Nashville, breakup, and solo projects ==
Sons of the Desert signed to MCA Nashville Records in October 1999. The band's first album for MCA, titled Change, was released a year later. The label also shifted the band's focus to just the Womack brothers and Virden. Saunders and Westrum still performed with the band, but were no longer considered official members; further, Westrum did not perform on Change, with session drummer Steve Brewster contributing in his place. The album also featured Keith Urban playing banjo on the track "Ride". The title track served as the first single from Change, followed by "Everybody's Gotta Grow Up Sometime". These songs peaked outside the country top 40.

Following "Everybody's Gotta Grow Up Sometime", Sons of the Desert appeared as guest vocalists on Lee Ann Womack's 2000 single "I Hope You Dance", which went to No. 1 on the country chart (Lee Ann is not related to the Womack brothers). The band's final chart single, "What I Did Right", was released after "I Hope You Dance", and reached a peak of No. 22 on the country chart in 2001. At the end of the year, Virden left the group, reducing Sons of the Desert to a duo of the Womack brothers.

Sons of the Desert exited the label and broke up. Drew Womack recorded a solo album for Smith Music Group in 2003 which featured several contributions from the band's other members, and a re-recording of "Leaving October". In 2012, Womack released his first solo album in nearly a decade, Sunshine to Rain, following surgery to rebuild a vertebra in his spine. The album is a significant musical departure from his previous work.

In March 2021, Womack succeeded Richie McDonald as the lead vocalist of Lonestar. It was due in part to McDonald joining The Frontmen, which also consists of Tim Rushlow and Larry Stewart, the former and current lead vocalists of Little Texas and Restless Heart, respectively.

== Discography ==
=== Studio albums ===
Title	Album details	Peak chart positions	
Title	Album details	US Country	US Heat
Whatever Comes First	Release date: June 3, 1997; Label: Epic Records	38	25
Change	Release date: June 13, 2000; Label: MCA Nashville	65	—
"—" denotes releases that did not chart

=== Singles ===
Year	Single	Peak chart positions		Album
Year	Single	US Country	CAN Country	Album
1997	"Whatever Comes First"	10	12	Whatever Comes First
1997	"Hand of Fate"	33	21	Whatever Comes First
1998	"Leaving October"	31	41	Whatever Comes First
1999	"What About You"	45	61	Sons of the Desert (unreleased)
1999	"Albuquerque"	58	54	Sons of the Desert (unreleased)
2000	"Change"	45	57	Change
2000	"Everybody's Gotta Grow Up Sometime"	42	63	Change
2001	"What I Did Right"^{A}	22	x	Change
x denotes that no applicable chart existed at the time

=== Guest singles ===
Year	Single	Artist	Peak chart positions			Album
Year	Single	Artist	US Country	US	CAN Country	Album
2000	"I Hope You Dance"	Lee Ann Womack	1	14	1	I Hope You Dance

- ^{A}Did not enter the Hot 100, but peaked at number 16 on Bubbling Under Hot 100 Singles.

=== Music videos ===
Year	Video	Director
1997	"Whatever Comes First"	Roger Pistole
1997	"Hand of Fate"	Roger Pistole
1999	"What About You"	Randy Spear
2000	"Change"	Trey Fanjoy
2000	"Everybody's Gotta Grow Up Sometime"	Trey Fanjoy

== Awards and nominations ==
=== Academy of Country Music Awards ===
Year	Nominee / work	Award	Result
2001	Sons of the Desert	Top New Vocal Group or Duo	Nominated
2001	"I Hope You Dance"	Song of the Year	Won
2001	"I Hope You Dance"	Single Record of the Year	Won
2001	Lee Ann Womack and Sons of the Desert	Vocal Event of the Year	Won
2002	Sons of the Desert	Top New Vocal Group or Duo	Nominated
2003	Sons of the Desert	Top Vocal Duo of the Year	Nominated

=== Country Music Association Awards ===
Year	Nominee / work	Award	Result
2000	Lee Ann Womack and Sons of the Desert	Vocal Event of the Year	Nominated
2002	Sons of the Desert	Vocal Duo of the Year	Nominated
2003	Sons of the Desert	Vocal Duo of the Year	Nominated

== External ==
- Drew Womack official website
