= This Is Your Brain =

Single by Joe Diffie

from the album Twice Upon a Time
- B-side: "I Got a Feelin'"
- Released: March 8, 1997
- Genre: Country
- Length: 3:36
- Label: Epic
- Songwriter(s): Kelly Garrett, Craig Wiseman
- Producer(s): Johnny Slate, Joe Diffie

Joe Diffie singles chronology
| "Whole Lotta Gone" (1996) | "This Is Your Brain" (1997) | "Somethin' Like This" (1997) |

"This Is Your Brain" is a song recorded by American country music artist Joe Diffie. It was released in March 1997 as the first single from the album Twice Upon a Time. The song reached #25 on the Billboard Hot Country Singles & Tracks chart. The song was written by Kelly Garrett and Craig Wiseman.

== Chart performance ==
| Chart (1997) | Peak position |
|---|---|
| US Hot Country Songs (Billboard) | 25 |
| Canadian RPM Country Tracks | 32 |
