= Twice Upon a Time (Joe Diffie album) =

Studio album by Joe Diffie
- Released: April 22, 1997
- Studio: SoundShop Recording Studios, Nashville, TN
- Genre: Country
- Length: 39:04
- Label: Epic
- Producer: Johnny Slate; Joe Diffie

Joe Diffie chronology
Life's So Funny (1995)	Twice Upon a Time (1997)	Greatest Hits (1998)

Singles from Twice Upon a Time
- 1. "This Is Your Brain" Released: March 8, 1997; 2. "Somethin' Like This" Released: July 5, 1997; 3. "The Promised Land" Released: October 1997

Professional ratings
Review scores
Source	Rating
Allmusic	2.5/5 stars

Twice Upon a Time is the seventh studio album by American country music artist Joe Diffie. It was released on April 22, 1997, through Epic Records. Singles released from the album include "This Is Your Brain", "Somethin' Like This", and "The Promised Land", which respectively reached #25, #40, and #61 on the Billboard Hot Country Singles & Tracks (now Hot Country Songs) charts. "The Promised Land" was also the second single of Diffie's career to miss Top 40 entirely, and this was also the first album of his career not to produce a Top 10 hit. Furthermore, the album did not earn an RIAA certification. Also included is "I Got a Feelin'", which was originally recorded by Tracy Lawrence on his 1994 album I See It Now.

Doug Virden and Drew Womack, who then recorded for Epic as members of the band Sons of the Desert, are featured as background vocalists on this album.

== Track listing ==
No.	Title	Writer(s)	Length
1.	"This Is Your Brain"	Kelly Garrett, Craig Wiseman	3:36
2.	"Twice Upon a Time"	Skip Ewing, Kim Williams	4:14
3.	"Show Me a Woman"	A.L. "Doodle" Owens, Doug Johnson	3:11
4.	"The Promised Land"	Fred Lehner, Andy Spooner	3:29
5.	"Houston, We Have a Problem"	Chris Lindsey, Steve Dukes, Michael Higgins	2:50
6.	"Somethin' Like This"	Ron Williams, Higgins	3:54
7.	"I Got a Feelin'"	Joe Diffie, Lonnie Wilson	3:08
8.	"Zero"	Bob DiPiero, Wiseman	3:37
9.	"It's Hard to Be Me"	Max T. Barnes, Leslie Satcher	3:37
10.	"Call Me John Doe"	Dennis Linde	3:12
11.	"One More Breath"	Satcher	4:18

== Personnel ==
- Lee Bogan – background vocals
- Joe Diffie – lead vocals, background vocals
- Stuart Duncan – fiddle
- Paul Franklin – steel guitar
- Brent Mason – electric guitar
- Randy McCormick – piano, organ, keyboards
- Terry McMillan – harmonica
- Steve Nathan – piano, organ, keyboards
- Matt Rollings – piano, organ, keyboards
- John Wesley Ryles – background vocals
- Doug Virden, Jimmy Gilstrap – background vocals
- Billy Joe Walker Jr. – acoustic guitar
- Jenna Werling – background vocals
- John Willis – acoustic guitar
- Lonnie Wilson – drums, percussion
- Drew Womack – background vocals
- Glenn Worf – bass guitar

== Chart performance ==
Chart (1997)	Peak position
U.S. Billboard Top Country Albums	33
