= No Change =

No Change may refer to:

- "No Change", a song by Avishai Cohen from Adama
- "No Change", a song by Chickenfoot from Chickenfoot III
- "No Change", a song by Levellers from A Weapon Called the Word
- "No Change", a song by Roy Harper from Loony on the Bus
- "No Change", a song by Stiff Little Fingers from Nobody's Heroes
- "No Change", a song by Twiztid from Unlikely Prescription
- "No Change", a song by Khaligraph Jones

== See also ==
- Change
