= Changes =

Changes may refer to:

== Books ==
- Changes: A Love Story, 1991 novel by Ama Ata Aidoo
- Changes (Butcher novel) (2010), the 12th novel in Jim Butcher's The Dresden Files Series
- Changes, a 1983 novel by Danielle Steel
- Changes, a trilogy of novels on which the BBC TV series was based, written by Peter Dickinson

== Film and television ==
- Changes (1991 film), a 1991 television film
- Changes (1969 film), a 1969 American drama film
- Changes (2026 film), a 2026 Czech film
- Changes (advertisement), a 1987 advertisement
- The Changes (TV series), produced by the BBC in 1975
- "Changes" (Clone High), a 2003 television episode
- "Changes" (House), a 2011 television episode
- "Changes" (Our Girl), a 2014 television episode
- "Changes", the name of five episodes of the TV sitcom Punky Brewster
- "Changes", a 1984 episode of the American TV sitcom Silver Spoons
- "Changes", the name of the You Can't Do That on Television 2004 reunion episode

== Music ==
- A jazz term for chord progression
  - Coltrane changes, type of harmonic progression, first used in 1959 by John Coltrane
- An algorithmic Change ringing, pattern for ringing tuned bells
- Changes (Godsmack video album), a 2004 documentary and live DVD by the heavy metal band Godsmack

=== Bands ===
- The Changes (band), an American rock band

=== Albums ===
- Changes (Billy "Crash" Craddock album), 1980
- Changes (Catapilla album), 1972
- Changes (Charles Bradley album), 2016
- Changes (Christopher Williams album), 1992
- Changes (Crow Mother album), 2013
- Changes (A Cursive Memory album), 2008
- Changes (Etta James album), 1980
- Changes (For the Fallen Dreams album), 2008
- Changes (John Williams album), 1971
- Changes (Johnny Rivers album), 1966
- Changes (Justin Bieber album), or the title song, 2020
- Changes (Keith Jarrett album), 1984
- Changes (Kelly Osbourne album), 2003
- Changes (Keni Burke album), 1982
- Changes (Kiley Dean album), 2010
- Changes (King Gizzard & the Lizard Wizard album), 2022
- Changes (Lisa Miskovsky album), 2006
- Changes (Modern Folk Quartet album), 1964
- Changes (The Monkees album), 1970
- Changes (Pandora album), 1996
- Changes (Roman Lob album), 2012
- Changes (Tanya Tucker album), 1983
- Changes (Vanilla Sky album), 2007
- Changesbowie, David Bowie compilation album, 1990

=== Songs ===
- "Changes" (Black Sabbath song), 1972
- "Changes" (Charlie Puth song), 2025
- "Changes" (David Bowie song), 1971
- "Changes" (Faul & Wad Ad song), 2013
- "Changes" (Gareth Gates song), 2007
- "Changes" (Imagination song), 1982
- "Changes" (Tupac Shakur song), 1998
- "Changes" (Will Young song), 2008
- "Changes" (XXXTentacion song), 2018
- "Changes" (Yes song), 1983
- "Changes", a 1970 song by Donovan on his Open Road album
- "Changes", a song by "Buddy" Miles & Jimi Hendrix on the album Band of Gypsys
- "Changes", a song by Phil Ochs
- "Changes", a song by the Spanish Artist Dareysteel 2003
- "Changes", a song by Godsmack on the album Faceless
- "Changes", a song by The Zombies on the album Odessey and Oracle
- "Changes", a song by 3 Doors Down on the album Away from the Sun
- "Changes", a song by Sugar on the album Copper Blue
- "Changes", a song by Chris Lake
- "Changes", a song by Moby Grape on their album Moby Grape
- "Changes", a song by Santana on their album Zebop!
- "Changes", a song by Mala of Digital Mystikz
- "Changes", a song by Blackbear from the album Anonymous
- "Changes", a single by Dirty Vegas from their third studio album Electric Love
- "Changes", a single by Alan Price
- "Changes", a promotional single by Brooke Candy
- "Changes", or "I Want Changes", or "Khochu peremen", a song by Viktor Tsoi associated with protest in Belarus and Russia
- "Changes", song by Tesla from the album Mechanical Resonance
- "Changes", a song by Olivia Newton-John from the albums Olivia and If You Love Me, Let Me Know

== See also ==
- Change (disambiguation)
