= What I Did Right =

Single by Sons of the Desert

from the album Change
- B-side: "I Need to Be Wrong Again"
- Released: February 10, 2001
- Genre: Country
- Length: 4:48
- Label: MCA Nashville
- Songwriter(s): Drew Womack, Sonny LeMaire
- Producer(s): Johnny Slate, Mark Wright, Sons of the Desert

Sons of the Desert singles chronology
"Everybody's Gotta Grow Up Somewhere" (2000)	"What I Did Right" (2001)

"What I Did Right" is a song recorded by American country music group Sons of the Desert. It was released in February 2001 as the third single from the album Change. The song reached number 22 on the Billboard Hot Country Singles & Tracks chart. Lead singer Drew Womack wrote the song with Sonny LeMaire. It would be their last Top 40 Hit, and the last single they ever released before their breakup.

== Content ==
The song is a ballad about treasuring moments in the narrator's life, using three examples: an expression of pride from a grandfather who fought in World War II, of love from the narrator's wife, and of comfort from the narrator's newborn daughter. All three examples are connected by a chorus stating "I'll take this one day and figure out what I did right / And I'll do it the same way for the rest of my life."

== Critical reception ==
Deborah Evans Price of Billboard reviewed the song favorably, saying that "Like 'I Hope You Dance'…the song will touch a universal chord with everyone who has experienced a moment so perfect they wish they could capture it and live it over again."

== Chart performance ==
Chart (2001)	Peak position
US Hot Country Songs (Billboard)	22
US Bubbling Under Hot 100 Singles (Billboard)	16
