= Pyeongchang (disambiguation) =

- Hangul: 평창
- RR: Pyeongchang
- MR: P'yŏngch'ang

Pyeongchang or PyeongChang may refer to:

== Sports ==
- 2018 Winter Olympics, the PyeongChang Games
- 2018 Winter Paralympics, the PyeongChang Games
- Pyeongchang Olympic Stadium, Daegwallyeong Township, Pyeongchang County, Gangwon Province, South Korea
- Pyeongchang FC, Pyeongchang-gun, Gangwon-do, South Korea; a soccer team

== Places ==
- Pyeongchang-gun (Pyeongchang County), Gangwon Province, South Korea (Korean: 평창군; Hanja: 平昌郡; P'yŏngch'ang-gun) a county with ski resorts
- Pyeongchang-eup (Pyeongchang Town), Pyeongchang-gun, Gangwon-do, South Korea (Korean: 평창읍; Hanja: 平昌邑; P'yŏngch'ang-ŭp) the seat of the eponymous county
- Pyeongchang-dong (Pyeongchang Neighbourhood), Jongno-gu (Jongno District), Seoul, South Korea (Korean: 평창동; Hanja: 平倉洞; P'yŏngch'ang-dong) a neighbourhood favoured by celebrities
- Gangneung-shi (Gangneung City), Gangwon, South Korea; a city that hosts many events for the 2018 PyeongChang Games, hence also known through association as of PyeongChang city.
- Alpensia Resort, Daegwallyeong Township, Pyeongchang County, Gangwon Province, South Korea; host of alpine events of the 2018 PyeongChang Games, hence also known through association as the PyeongChang Ski Resort
- Daegwallyeong-myeon (Daegwallyeong Township), Pyeongchang-gun, Gangwon-do, South Korea; a township that hosts many of the outdoor events of the 2018 PyeongChang Games, hence also known through association as the PyeongChang township.

== See also ==
- Pyeong
- Chang (disambiguation)
- The dictionary definition of 平 at Wiktionary
- The dictionary definition of 평 at Wiktionary
- The dictionary definition of 昌 at Wiktionary
- The dictionary definition of 창 at Wiktionary
- The dictionary definition of 倉 at Wiktionary
- Pyongyang
- Pyonggang
- Pingchang (disambiguation) (Chinese: 平昌)
