= Leaving October =

Single by Sons of the Desert

from the album Whatever Comes First
- Released: January 17, 1998
- Genre: Country
- Length: 4:28
- Label: Epic
- Songwriter(s): Drew Womack, Tom Douglas
- Producer(s): Johnny Slate, Doug Johnson

Sons of the Desert singles chronology
"Hand of Fate" (1997)	"Leaving October" (1998)	"What About You" (1999)

"Leaving October" is a song recorded by American country music group Sons of the Desert. It was released in January 1998 as the third single from the album Whatever Comes First. The song reached #31 on the Billboard Hot Country Singles & Tracks chart. The song was written by the band's lead singer Drew Womack, along with Tom Douglas.

== Content ==
The song is a ballad about the narrator missing his wife, who died in October 1989. In the chorus, he sings of the pain of her memory, saying that "If I live in the past, there's no future / Looking forward to leaving October behind."

== Critical reception ==
A review in Billboard was positive, praising the "heartache and resignation" in Womack's voice, while calling the song itself "extremely powerful". Brian Wahlert of Country Standard Time considered the song a standout in his review of the album.

== Chart performance ==
Chart (1998)	Peak position
US Hot Country Songs (Billboard)	31
Canadian RPM Country Tracks	41
