= Zhoutiegang railway station =

Railway station in Hubei, China

Zhoutiegang railway station 周鐵崗站

General information
- Location: Hubei; China
- Operated by: Wuhan Railway Bureau, China Railway Corporation
- Line: Yichang−Wanzhou Railway
Location

The Zhoutiegang railway station, located in Baiguo Town, Macheng City, Hubei Province, was originally named Baiguo Station. It is a fifth-class railway station on the Beijing–Kowloon railway. situated 1,103 kilometers from Beijing West station and 1,212 kilometers from Changping station. The station was built in 1996 and only handles freight.
