= Whatever Comes First =

Studio album by Sons of the Desert
- Released: June 3, 1997
- Genre: Country
- Length: 43:41
- Label: Epic
- Producer: Johnny Slate; Doug Johnson

Sons of the Desert chronology
Whatever Comes First (1997)	Change (2001)

Singles from Whatever Comes First
- 1. "Whatever Comes First" Released: February 17, 1997; 2. "Hand of Fate" Released: August 18, 1997; 3. "Leaving October" Released: January 12, 1998

Professional ratings
Review scores
Source	Rating
Allmusic	link
Country Standard Time	link

Whatever Comes First is the debut studio album by American country music band Sons of the Desert. The album was released in 1997 (see 1997 in country music) on Epic Records. It produced three singles for them on the Billboard country singles charts: the Top Ten "Whatever Comes First", as well as "Leaving October" and "Hand of Fate". All of which, reached the Top 40 on the Hot Country Songs chart.

== Content ==
"Drive Away" was co-written by Phil Vassar, who would later record the song for his self-titled debut album. Additionally, lead singer Drew Womack later re-recorded "Leaving October" on his 2004 self-titled debut.

== Track listing ==
No.	Title	Writer(s)	Length
1.	"Hand of Fate"	Michael Lunn, Michael Noble	3:47
2.	"Whatever Comes First"	Walt Aldridge, Brad Crisler, Drew Womack	3:02
3.	"Leaving October"	Womack, Tom Douglas	4:28
4.	"Bring On the Angel"	Womack, Jack Blades, Vinx	4:05
5.	"You Can Come Cryin' to Me"	Radney Foster	4:04
6.	"Colorado"	Womack	4:54
7.	"When It's Right"	Womack, Steve Pippin, Chris Lindsey	3:16
8.	"Promises"	Pippin, Womack, Pat MacDonald	3:34
9.	"Drive Away"	Phil Vassar, Charlie Black	3:26
10.	"Devil on Both Shoulders"	Womack	4:08
11.	"Burned in My Mind"	Womack	4:57

== Personnel ==
=== Sons of the Desert ===
- Scott Saunders – keyboards
- Doug Virden – bass guitar, background vocals
- Brian Westrum – drums
- Drew Womack – acoustic guitar, lead vocals
- Tim Womack – electric guitar, background vocals

=== Additional musicians ===
- Bob Mason – cello on "Colorado"
- Brent Mason – electric guitar on "Hand of Fate"
- Tom Roady – percussion on "Drive Away," "Hand of Fate," "Promises"
- Matt Rollings – keyboard on "Leaving October"
- Billy Joe Walker Jr. – acoustic guitar on "Promises"
- John Willis – "eclectic guru instruments"

== Charts ==
Chart (1997)	Peak position
U.S. Billboard Top Country Albums	38
U.S. Billboard Top Heatseekers	25
