= Whatever Comes First (song) =

Single by Sons of the Desert

from the album Whatever Comes First
- B-side: "Drive Away"
- Released: February 17, 1997
- Genre: Country
- Length: 3:03
- Label: Epic
- Songwriter(s): Drew Womack, Walt Aldridge, Brad Crisler
- Producer(s): Johnny Slate, Doug Johnson

Sons of the Desert singles chronology
"Whatever Comes First" (1997)	"Hand of Fate" (1997)

"Whatever Comes First" is the debut song written by Drew Womack, Walt Aldridge and Brad Crisler, and recorded by American country music group Sons of the Desert. It was released in February 1997 as the first single and title track from the album Whatever Comes First. The song reached #10 on the Billboard Hot Country Singles & Tracks chart.

== Music video ==
The music video was directed by Roger Pistole and premiered in March 1997.

== Chart performance ==
"Whatever Comes First" debuted at number 54 on the U.S. Billboard Hot Country Singles & Tracks for the week of March 8, 1997.

Chart (1997)	Peak position
Canada Country Tracks (RPM)	12
US Hot Country Songs (Billboard)	10

=== Year-end charts ===
Chart (1997)	Position
Canada Country Tracks (RPM)	100
