= Ming Tombs station =

Beijing Subway station

Ming Tombs 十三陵景区
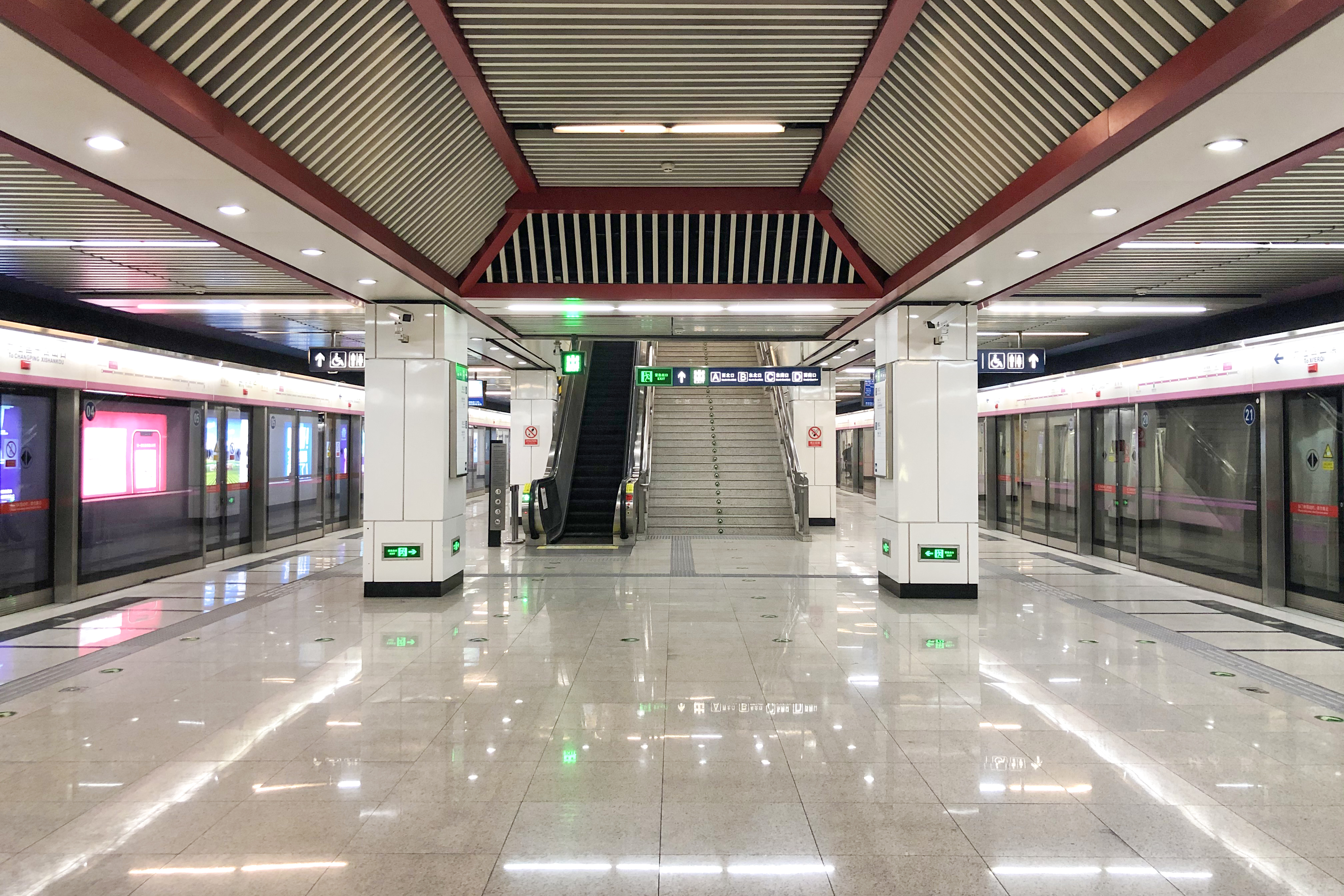
- Platform

General information
- Location: Jiantou Village, Shisanling, Changping District, Beijing; China
- Coordinates: 40°14′25″N 116°12′28″E
- Operator: Beijing Mass Transit Railway Operation Corporation Limited
- Line: Changping line
- Platforms: 2 (1 island platform)
- Tracks: 2

Construction
- Structure type: Underground
- Accessible: Yes

History
- Opened: December 26, 2015; 10 years ago

Services
Preceding station	Beijing Subway	Following station
Changping Xishankou Terminus	Changping line	Changping towards Jimen Qiao
Location
- Location within Beijing

Ming Tombs station (simplified Chinese: 十三陵景区站; traditional Chinese: 十三陵景區站; pinyin: Shísānlíng Jǐngqū Zhàn; lit. 'Thirteen Mausoleums Scenic Area station'), is a station on the Changping Line of the Beijing Subway. It was opened on 26 December 2015.

Despite being named after the Ming Tombs, the station itself is still 4 km away from the actual Ming Tombs Scenic Area, and has no other public transport access as of 2021 due to road conditions.

== Station layout ==
The station has an underground island platform.

== Exits ==
There are 4 exits, lettered A, B, C, and D. Exit C is accessible.

== See also ==
- Ming Tombs
- Ming Tombs Reservoir
- Shisanling town (十三陵镇)
