= Chump Change =

Chump Change may refer to:

- Chump Change (film), a 2000/2004 film written by, directed by and starring Stephen Burrows
- "Chump Change" (Quincy Jones song), the theme from The New Bill Cosby Show and the game show Now You See It
- "Chump Change", a song by Albert King, written by Barry Murphy and Eric Morgeson for Groovesville Music, on the album King Albert (1977)
- "Chump Change", a song by Pitchshifter from their album Deviant (2000)
- "Chump Change", a song by The New Pornographers from their album Electric Version (2003)
- Chump Change, a 1996 novel by David Eddie

== See also ==
- "Trump Change" (often mistakenly called "Chump Change"), a song by E-40's album The Element of Surprise (1998)
