= Baiguo railway station (Sichuan) =

Railway station in Sichuan, China

Coordinates: 28.8137°N 102.6024°E

Baiguo 白果
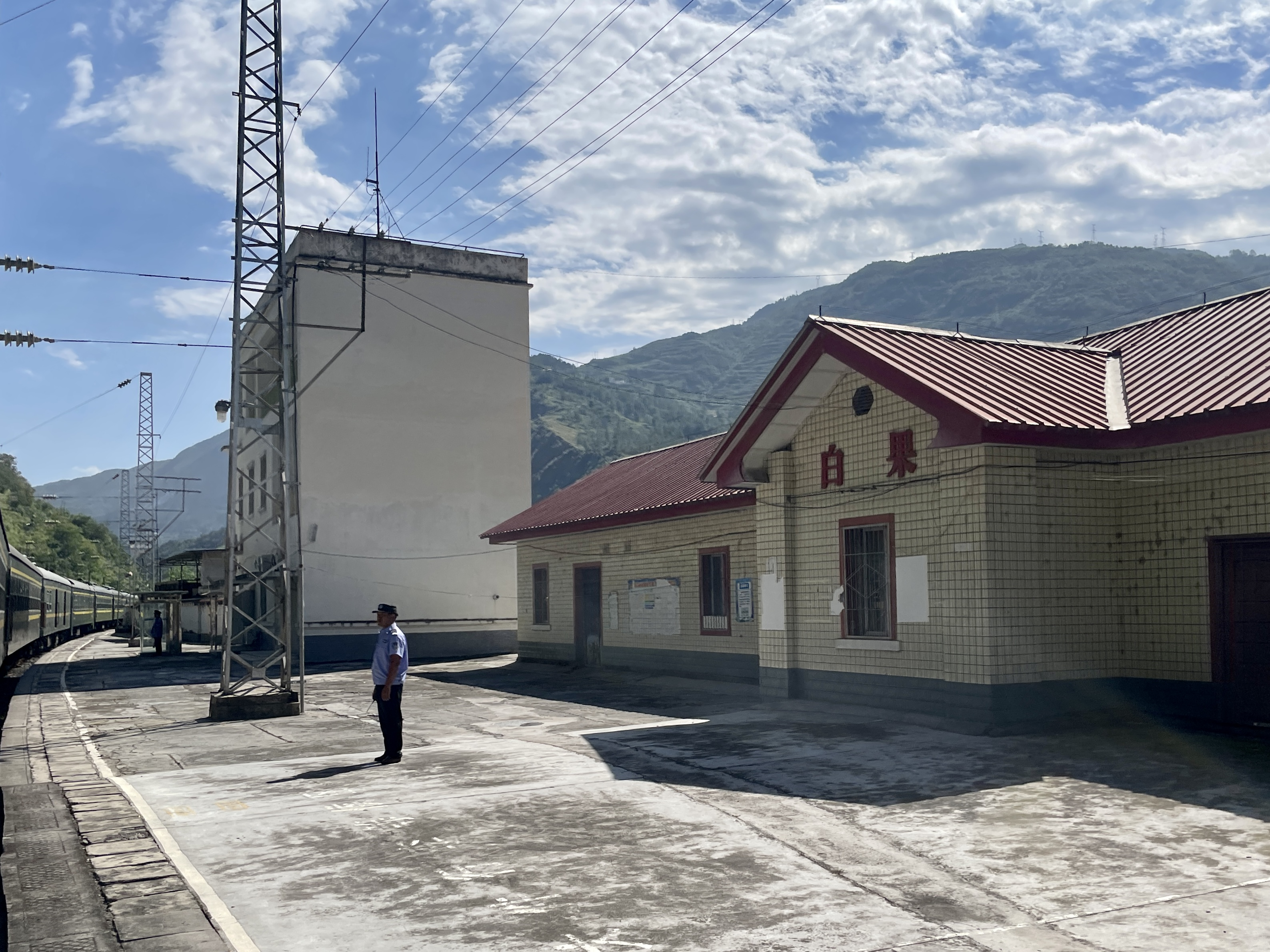

General information
- Location: Yuexi County, Liangshan Yi Autonomous Prefecture, Sichuan; China
- Operator: Chengdu Railway Bureau, China Railway Corporation
- Line: Chengdu–Kunming Railway

Other information
- Station code: 47828

History
- Opened: 1970
Location
- Location within Sichuan Location within China

Baiguo railway station (Chinese: 白果站; pinyin: Báiguǒ Zhàn, Yi: ꀙꇬ bit ko) is a railway station of Chengdu–Kunming Railway in Yuexi County, Sichuan, China.

== See also ==
- Chengdu–Kunming Railway
