= Chang, Iran =

Chang چنگ
- Village
- Location within Iran
- Coordinates: 27°02′38″N 55°12′21″E
- Country: Iran
- Province: Hormozgan
- County: Bandar Lengeh
- Bakhsh: Central
- Rural District: Dezhgan

Population (2006)
  - Total: 144
- Time zone: UTC+3:30 (IRST)
  - Summer (DST): UTC+4:30 (IRDT)

Chang (Persian: چنگ, also Romanized as Chenag) is a village in Dezhgan Rural District, in the Central District of Bandar Lengeh County, Hormozgan Province, Iran. At the 2006 census, its population was 144, in 30 families.
