= Change (Sons of the Desert album) =

Studio album by Sons of the Desert
- Released: June 13, 2000
- Genre: Country
- Length: 46:08
- Label: MCA Nashville
- Producer: Johnny Slate; Mark Wright; Sons of the Desert

Sons of the Desert chronology
Whatever Comes First (1997)	Change (2000)

Singles from Change
- 1. "Change" Released: March 6, 2000; 2. "Everybody's Gotta Grow Up Sometime" Released: July 24, 2000; 3. "What I Did Right" Released: January 22, 2001

Professional ratings
Review scores
Source	Rating
AllMusic	4/5 stars
Entertainment Weekly	B

Change is the second and final studio album by American country music band Sons of the Desert. It was released on June 13, 2000 via MCA Nashville, and contains the singles "Change", "Everybody's Gotta Grow up Sometime" and "What I Did Right". "Albuquerque" was originally recorded by the band in the late 1990s for an unreleased second album for Epic Records, their former label.

== Production ==
The album was mostly produced by Johnny Slate.

== Critical reception ==
Country Standard Time wrote that the album "borders far more towards a generic, pop-sounding brand of country." Exclaim! thought that "the harmonies are their stock in trade and each track is expertly produced - riding that fine line between overly slick and heartfelt."

== Track listing ==
Change track listing
No.	Title	Writer(s)	Length
1.	"Goodbye to Hello"	Doug Virden; Drew Womack; Tim Womack	4:09
2.	"Albuquerque"	Stephonie Seekel; Chris Lindsey	3:19
3.	"What I Did Right"	Sonny LeMaire; D. Womack	4:48
4.	"Everybody's Gotta Grow Up Sometime"	Seekel; Lindsey	3:28
5.	"Too Far to Where You Are"	Danny Orton; Don Pfrimmer	3:36
6.	"I Need to Be Wrong Again"	Monty Powell; D. Womack	3:56
7.	"That's the Kind of Love You're In"	D. Womack; Randy Albright	4:33
8.	"Real Fine Love"	John Hiatt	4:20
9.	"Blue Money"	Greg Barnhill; Jim Daddario	4:56
10.	"Change"	Craig Wiseman; Mark Selby	3:23
11.	"Ride"	Troy Verges; D. Womack	5:36
Total length:			46:08

== Personnel ==
=== Sons of the Desert ===
- Scott Saunders – piano, Hammond B-3 organ, synthesizer
- Doug Virden – bass guitar, electric autoharp, background vocals
- Drew Womack – lead vocals, acoustic guitar, electric guitar, kazoo
- Tim Womack – background vocals, acoustic guitar, electric guitar

=== Additional musicians ===
- Steve Brewster – drums, percussion
- Paul Franklin – steel guitar
- John Willis – electric guitar, acoustic guitar, banjo on "Goodbye to Hello"
- Keith Urban – banjo on "Ride"
- David Campbell – string arranger

== Charts ==
Chart (2001)	Peak position
US Top Country Albums (Billboard)	65
