= Chang number =

In mathematics, the Chang number of an irreducible representation of a simple complex Lie algebra is its dimension modulo 1 + h, where h is the Coxeter number. Chang numbers are named after Chang (1982), who rediscovered an element of order h + 1 found by Kac (1981).

Kac (1981) showed that there is a unique class of regular elements σ of order h + 1, in the complex points of the corresponding Chevalley group. He showed that the trace of σ on an irreducible representation is −1, 0, or +1, and if h + 1 is prime then the trace is congruent to the dimension mod h+1. This implies that the dimension of an irreducible representation is always −1, 0, or +1 mod h + 1 whenever h + 1 is prime.

== Examples ==
In particular, for the exceptional compact Lie groups G_{2}, F4, E6, E7, and E8 the number h + 1 = 7, 13, 13, 19, 31 is always prime, so the Chang number of an irreducible representation is always +1, 0, or −1.

For example, the first few irreducible representations of G2 (with Coxeter number h = 6) have dimensions 1, 7, 14, 27, 64, 77, 182, 189, 273, 286,... These are congruent to 1, 0, 0, −1, 1, 0, 0, 0, 0, −1,... mod 7 = h + 1.
