= Chang dance =

Folk dance of Rajasthan, India

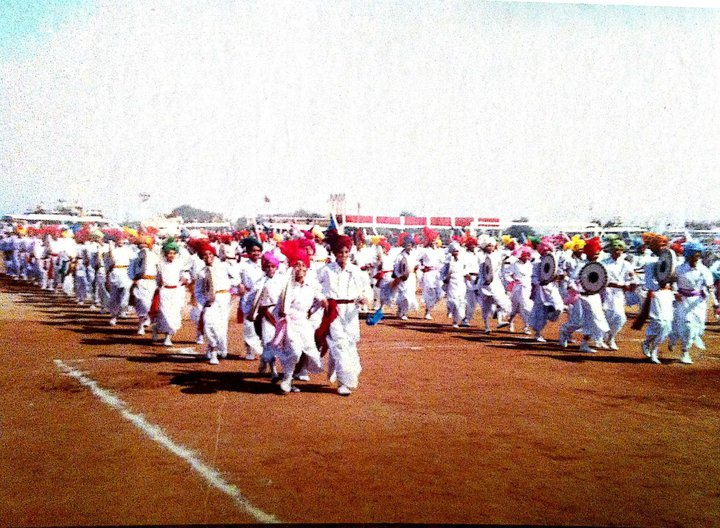
- A folk dance from Rajasthan, India
- Genre: Folk dance
- Instrument(s): Chang (tambourine), Cymbal, Flute, Ghungroo, Drums
- Origin: Shekhawati region, Rajasthan, India
- Related dances: Dhamaal (folk songs)

Chang dance, is a folk dance from Rajasthan, India. It is also referred to Dhamal, dhuff dance,, and as Holi dance as it is performed during the Hindu festival of the same name (Holi) to celebrate the defeat of evil. It is a group dance performed by men, carousing and singing riotously to the rhythmic beat of the chang instrument.

It originates from the Shekhawati region of Rajasthan. This dance period is starts from the Maha Shivaratri festival and ends on Dhulandi, which is the day after the Holi festival. Folk songs used in this folk dance are called Dhamaal. All men sings, dance and dance. Meanwhile, some represents also plays which is called Sang.

== Instruments ==
- Chang, or, duff (a kind of tambourine) - Eponymous with the folk dance form, this instrument consists of a wooden disc, typically 2 feet (24 in) to 3 feet (36 in) in radius, covered on a single side with stretched male sheep skin leather. The turmeric and other aromatic sprays are made on. Some type of painting is also made on it.
- Cymbal - round flat or convexity metal (usually bronze or iron) rhythm instrument, the couple is played by onto the rag date.
- Flute - it is created from natural bamboo. Bales is removed inside Bamboo, eight holes on the body are made. First holes of all are to play with the mouth, the rest seven gives different sounds out of the hole.
- Ghungroo - a musical anklet tied to the feet of classical Indian dancers
- Drums and other instruments are currently in use also.

=== The time of chang dance ===
Chang dance starts from Mahashivratri (a festival of India) during day and night whole the month and ends at last of Holi festival. People after agriculture and domestic work collects in Chauk (a ground in the village) and enjoys it.

=== Area of chang dance ===
Chang dance event is all over Rajasthan. But this major area shekhawati region (sikar, churu, jhunjhunu and Bikaner) where this dance is much disciplined, systematic way with sponsored scheme. This dance is usually in the border districts States of Rajasthan are found.
