= Small change =

Small change may refer to:

- Coins, particularly those of low value
- Small Change (film), 1976, directed by François Truffaut
- Small Change (Tom Waits album), 1976
- Small Change (Prism album), 1981
- Small Change trilogy, a series of novels by Jo Walton
- Small Changes, a 1969 collection by Hal Clement
