= Chang Liu (synthetic biologist) =

American bioengineer

Chang C. Liu
- Education: Harvard University (BA); Scripps Research Institute (PhD)
- Known for: Orthogonal DNA Replication, Continuous evolution, Synthetic biology
- Awards: NIH Director's Transformative Research Award (2020); Moore Inventor Fellow (2019); Sloan Research Fellowship (2016); NIH Director's New Innovator Award (2015); Beckman Young Investigator Award (2015)
- Scientific career
- Fields: Biomedical engineering, Chemical biology, Synthetic biology
- Doctoral advisor: Peter G. Schultz
- Website: liulab.com

Chang C. Liu is an American chemist and biological engineer. He heads the Division of Biomolecular and Cellular Engineering at the Ellison Institute of Technology, Oxford.

Liu's work integrates principles from chemistry and engineering to create genetic systems capable of rapid evolution and molecular recording.

== Education ==
Liu graduated summa cum laude and Phi Beta Kappa from Harvard University in 2005 with a B.A. in Chemistry. He completed his Ph.D. at the Scripps Research Institute in 2009 under Peter G. Schultz, focusing on expanding the bacterial genetic code. From 2009 to 2012, he was a Miller Postdoctoral Fellow at University of California, Berkeley, working with Adam Arkin on RNA-based regulatory systems.

== Research ==
Liu's laboratory at UC Irvine focuses on synthetic biology, protein engineering, and molecular evolution.

=== Continuous evolution and orthogonal DNA replication ===
Liu is best known for developing orthogonal DNA replication, a genetic architecture that achieves durable continuous mutation and evolution of target genes in vivo. This is exemplified by OrthoRep, a highly error-prone, orthogonal DNA replication system in yeast. OrthoRep allows for the targeted mutagenesis of specific genes at rates orders of magnitude higher than the genomic mutation limit. By decoupling the evolution of user-selected genes from the host genome, OrthoRep enables the continuous in vivo evolution of proteins and enzymes, accelerating the discovery of new biological functions and the study of sequence-function relationships.

=== Molecular recording ===
His group engineers specialized genetic systems to record transient biological information as heritable mutations. Such "molecular ticker tape" approaches utilize high mutation rates to track cellular lineages and developmental events in animal models and cancer progression at high cellular resolution.

== Career ==
Liu joined the UCI faculty in 2013. In 2024, he was appointed the inaugural Director of the UCI Engineering + Health Institute. He also served as a Chancellor's Fellow at UCI for the 2022-2025 term. Since 2026, he has moved his lab from UCI to Ellison Institute at Oxford.

== Awards and honors ==
- Blavatnik National Awards for Young Scientists Finalist (2022)
- Fellow, American Institute for Medical and Biological Engineering (2022)
- NIH Director's Transformative Research Award (2020)
- Moore Inventor Fellow (2019)
- ACS Synthetic Biology Young Innovator Award (2019)
- Sloan Research Fellowship (2016)
- NIH Director's New Innovator Award (2015)
- Beckman Young Investigator Award (2015)
- Hertz Foundation Fellowship (2005)
