= Liu Zhang =

Liu Zhang may refer to:

- Liu Zhang (prince) 劉章, Western Han imperial clan member involved in overthrowing the Lü clan during the Lü Clan Disturbance
- Liu Zhang (warlord) 劉璋, warlord in the late Eastern Han Dynasty, who controlled Yi Province
- Liu Zhang (writer) (劉章, c. 1095–1177), writer

(NB: The 7th son of Liu Bang, Liu Chang (刘长) does not belong in this list, since the accepted reading of the given name in this case is not Zhang)
