= Change, Nepal =

Change चाँगे गाविस
- Village development committee
- Location in Nepal
- Coordinates: 27.32°N 87.58°E
- Country: Nepal
- Province: Province No. 1
- District: Taplejung District

Population (1991)
  - Total: 4,487
- Time zone: UTC+5:45 (Nepal Time)
- Postal code: 57511
- Area code: 024

VDC Map of Taplejung District

Change is a village development committee in the Himalayas of Taplejung District in the Province No. 1 of north-eastern Nepal. At the time of the 2011 Nepal census it had a population of 4034 people living in 861 individual households.

This Village Development Committee (now changed to Gaun Palika, गाँऊ पालिका) is mainly inhabited by Limbu and Mongolian ethnic groups, more specifically Angbuhang, an indigenous tribe. This VDC produces cash crops like oranges, cardamom and tobacco. West/south to North/east orientation of land and south facing slope has provided opportunity to get more sunny hours. Change has the hiking route (now being introduced as a rhododendron hiking trail) Taplejung-Gorja-Basantapur, which passes from the middle along its length.
