= Chang Himal =

Mountain in Nepal

- Ramthang Chang
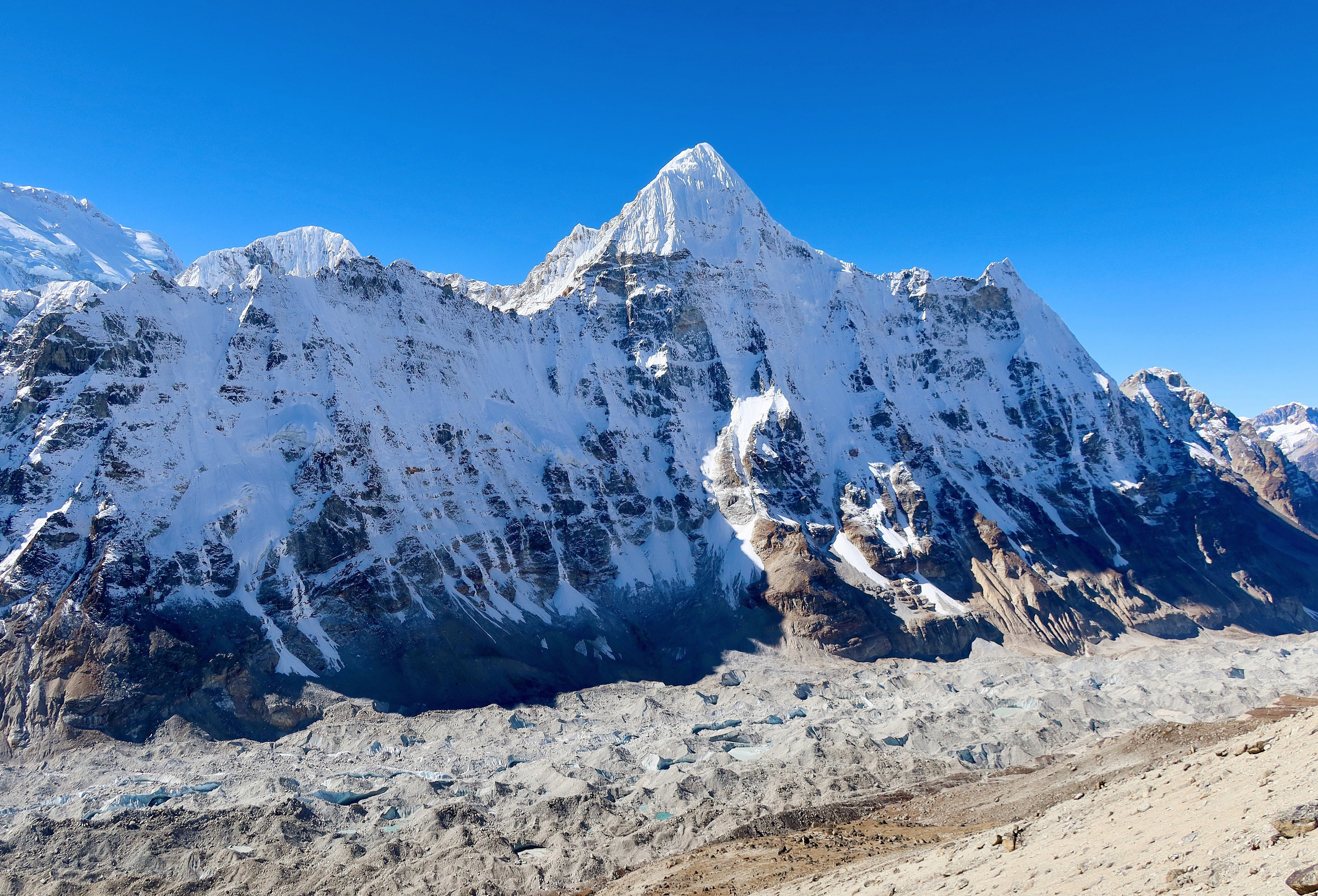
- Northeast aspect

Highest point
- Elevation: 6,802 m (22,316 ft)
- Prominence: 702 m (2,303 ft)
- Parent peak: Kangbachen
- Isolation: 4.7 km (2.9 mi)
- Coordinates: 27°45′57″N 88°05′03″E

Geography
- Location within Nepal
- Interactive map of Chang Himal
- Country: Nepal
- Province: Koshi
- District: Taplejung
- Protected area: Kanchenjunga Conservation Area
- Parent range: Himalayas

Climbing
- First ascent: 1974

Chang Himal, also known as Ramthang Chang or Wedge Peak, is a mountain in Nepal.

== Description ==
Chang Himal is a 6,802-metre (22,316-foot) glaciated summit in the Nepalese Himalayas. It is situated nine kilometres (5.6 mi) northwest of Kangchenjunga in the Kanchenjunga Conservation Area. Precipitation runoff from the mountain's slopes drains into the Ghunsa River which is a tributary of the Tamur River. Topographic relief is significant as the summit rises 1,820 metres (5,970 ft) above the Kangchenjunga Glacier in 1.5 kilometres (0.93 mi).

The first ascent of the summit was made on October 5, 1974, by Janez Gradisar, Bojan Pollak, and Michael Smolej via the southwest ridge. The north face was first climbed October 29 – November 2, 2009, by Nick Bullock and Andy Houseman (1800 m, ED+ M6).

== Climate ==
Based on the Köppen climate classification, Chang Himal is located in a tundra climate zone with cold, snowy winters, and cool summers. Weather systems coming off the Bay of Bengal are forced upwards by the Himalaya mountains (orographic lift), causing heavy precipitation in the form of rainfall and snowfall. Mid-June through early-August is the monsoon season. The months of April, May, September, and October offer the most favorable weather for viewing or climbing this peak.

== Gallery ==
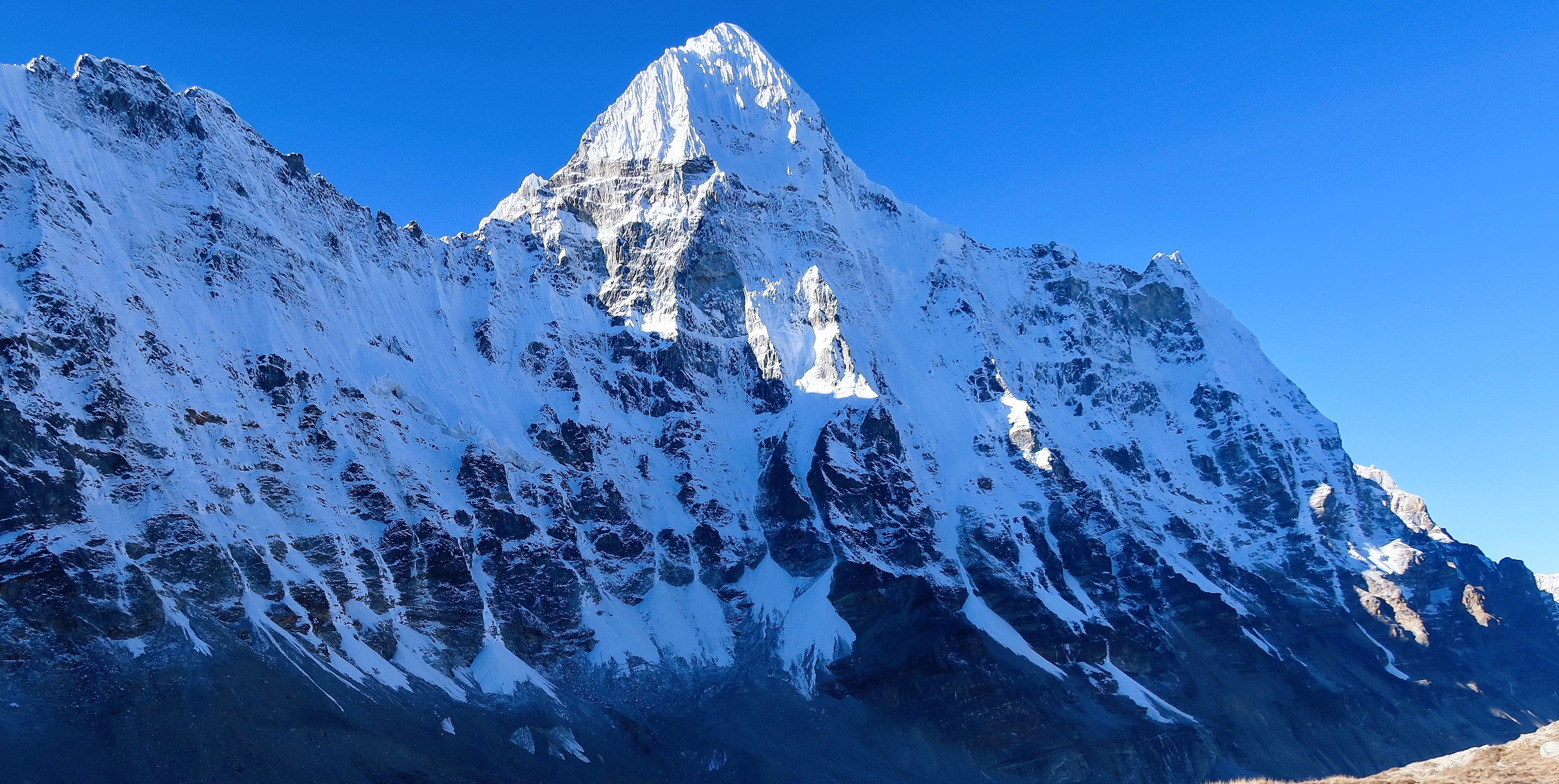
Northeast aspect

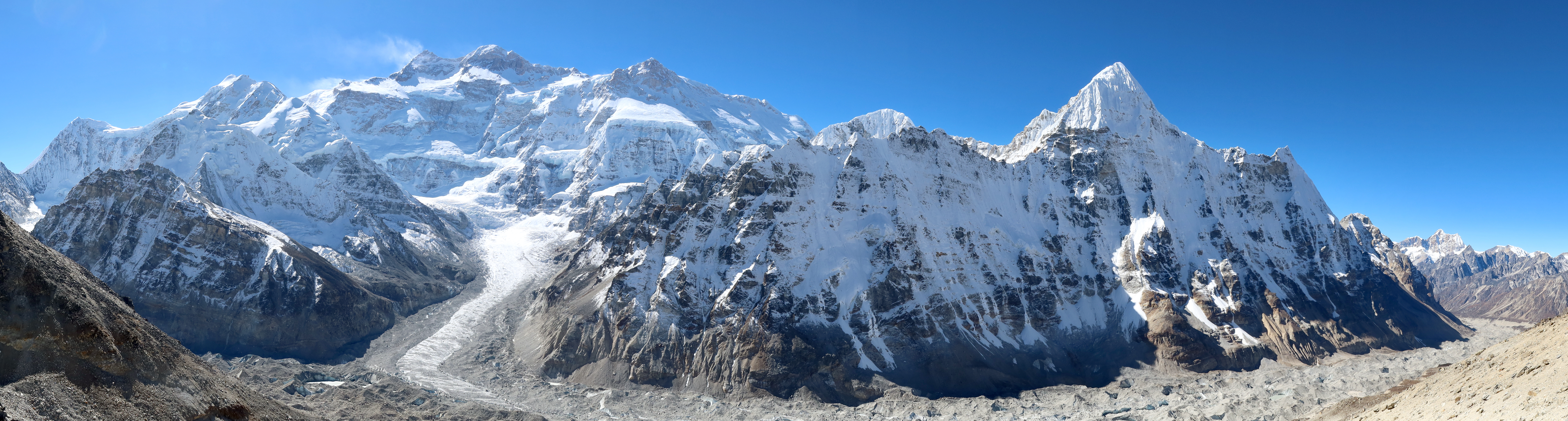
North aspect of Kangchenjunga (left), with Chang Himal (right)

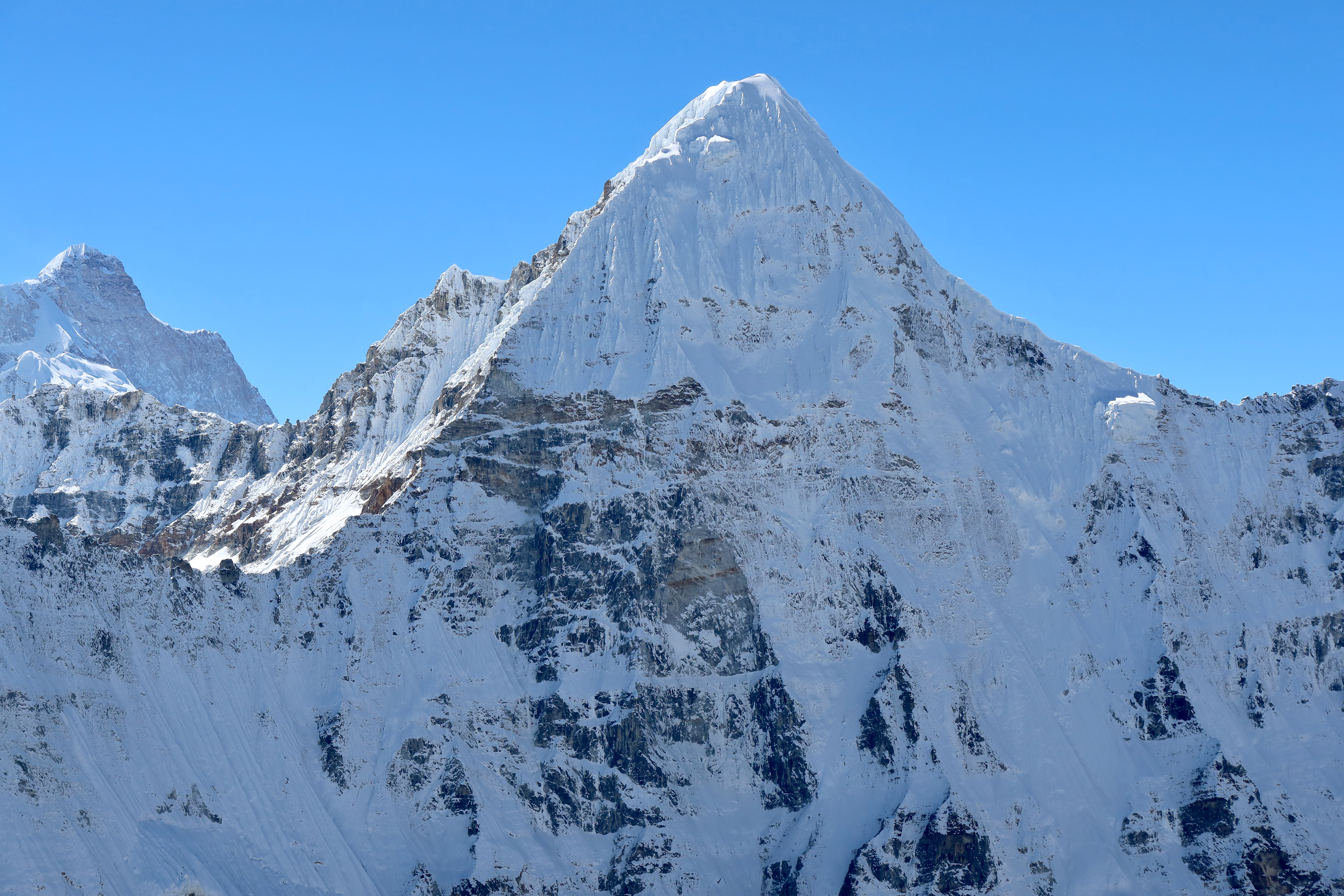
North face

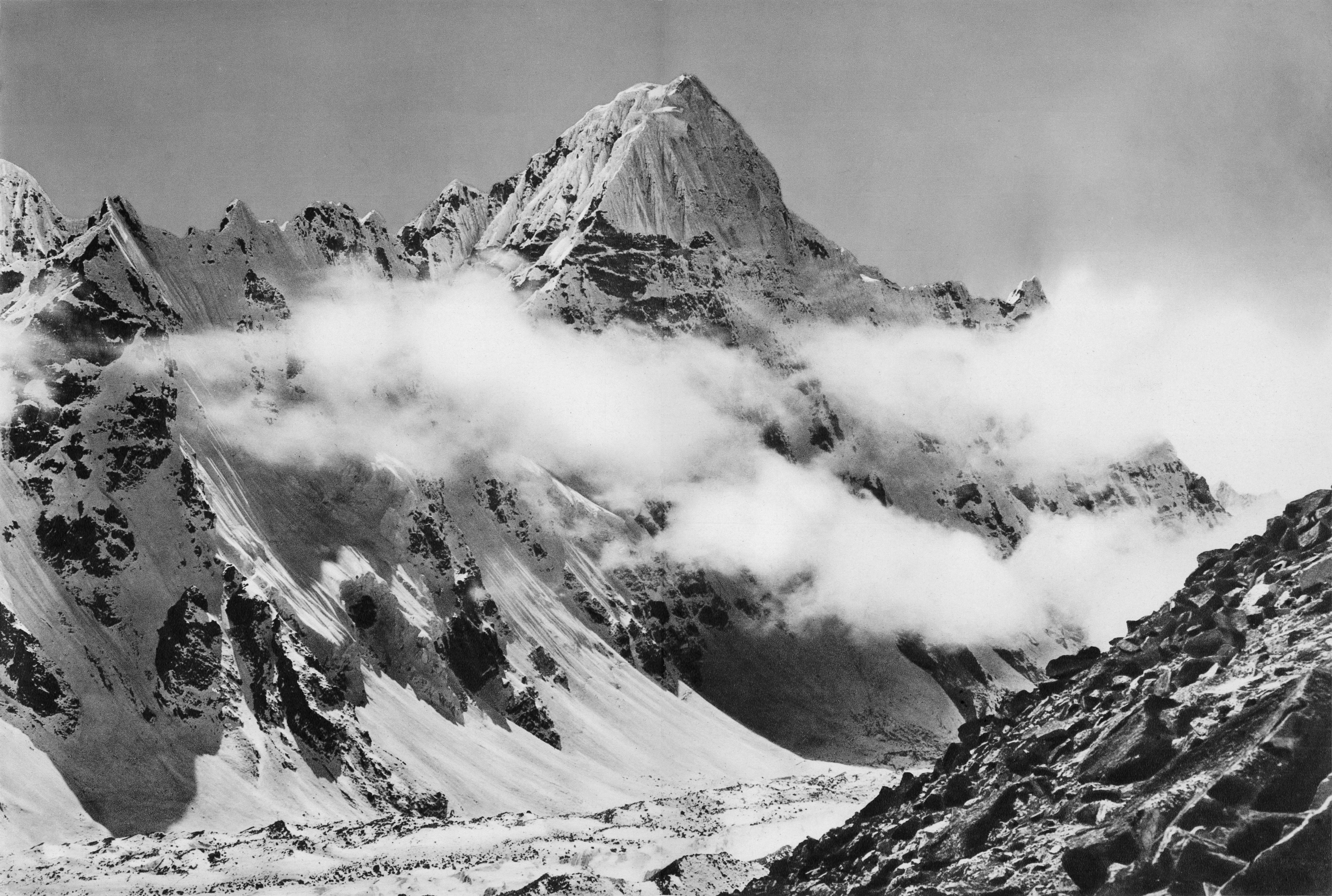
circa 1930

== See also ==
- Geology of the Himalayas
