= Chang'e (disambiguation) =

Chang'e is a Chinese moon goddess.

Chang'e may also refer to:

== Astronomy ==
- Chang'e program, China's Chinese Lunar Exploration Program (CLEP):
  - Chang'e 1, the first CLEP lunar orbiter, launched on 24 October 2007
  - Chang'e 2, the second CLEP orbiter, launched on 1 October 2010
  - Chang'e 3, a CLEP lunar lander and rover, launched on 1 December 2013
  - Chang'e 4, a CLEP lunar lander and rover, launched on 7 December 2018
  - Chang'e 5-T1, a lunar mission launched on 23 October 2014
  - Chang'e 5, a lunar sample-return mission, launched on 23 November 2020
  - Chang'e 6, a second lunar sample-return mission, launched on 3 May 2024
  - Chang'e 7, a lunar mission expected to launch in 2026
  - Chang'e 8, a lunar mission expected to launch in 2028
- 4047 Chang'E, an asteroid.

== Other ==
- Chang'e, a hero in Mobile Legends: Bang Bang
- "Chang'e", a 2023 song by King Gizzard & the Lizard Wizard from The Silver Cord

== See also ==
- Chang (disambiguation)
- Chang-Ngo – a crater on the Moon
- Chinggis (disambiguation)
