= Somethin' Like This =

Single by Joe Diffie

from the album Twice Upon a Time
- B-side: "This Is Your Brain"
- Released: July 5, 1997
- Genre: Country
- Length: 3:54
- Label: Epic
- Songwriter(s): Michael Higgins, Ron Williams
- Producer(s): Johnny Slate, Joe Diffie

Joe Diffie singles chronology
"This Is Your Brain" (1997)	"Somethin' Like This" (1997)	"The Promised Land" (1997)

"Somethin' Like This" is a song recorded by American country music artist Joe Diffie. It was released in August 1997 as the second single from the album Twice Upon a Time. The song reached #40 on the Billboard Hot Country Singles & Tracks chart. The song was written by Michael Higgins and Ron Williams.

== Chart performance ==
Chart (1997)	Peak position
US Hot Country Songs (Billboard)	40
Canadian RPM Country Tracks	76
