= Changer (band) =

Icelandic death metal/metalcore band

- Origin: Akureyri, Iceland; Reykjavík, Iceland (present)
- Genres: Death metal, metalcore
- Years active: 1999−present
- Members: Kristján B. Heiðarsson; Hörður Halldorsson; Magnús Halldór Pálsson; Hlynur Örn Zophaníasson; Óskar Rúnarsson
- Past members: See below
- Website: www.changer-metal.com

Changer is an Icelandic death metal / metalcore band, formed in 1999. The band has released three albums and three EPs.

== History ==
Drummer Kristján B. Heiðarsson founded Changer in October 1999 in Akureyri, Iceland, as a one-man project. Heiðarsson wrote and recorded the band's first album, January 109, in January 2000. The recordings were handled by Aðalsteinn Már Björnssson, who was killed in a car accident. The album was released on 29 February 2000.

In May 2000, Heiðarsson moved to Reykjavík and started assembling a full band. A full line-up was established in late 2000. Changer began playing shows in Iceland in 2001, and traveled to Akureyri in the spring to record the EP Inconsistency, which consisted of two new songs along with reworkings of two songs from January 109. It was released in July 2001.

Recording for the next album began in late December 2002, but Scenes was not released until 13 February 2004.

In 2005, Changer played overseas for the first time, at Nevelfest in Antwerp, Belgium. Line-up changes took place shortly after returning home.

Changer started rehearsing and writing new material. In May 2006, the band toured Belgium, the Netherlands, and Germany. The EP Breed the Lies was released on 1 June 2006. Mixed and mastered by Tue Madsen at Antfarm Studios, Denmark, the EP was placed at number 16-20 on the Icelandic Grapevine as one of the best albums of Iceland for 2006. Later in 2006, the band toured Iceland in support of Cannibal Corpse and Rotting Christ at Eistnaflug. During this time, they were featured in a web series that focuses on the Icelandic scene called 'Sleepless in Reykjavik', in which their music video for "Recaptured Sanity" was used in the first episode. In August 2007, Gisli left and the band looked for a new bassist. Jón Karl joined for a short time and then Atli Jarl Martin joined as a permanent bassist.

Changer planned to travel abroad to record their next album. However, in November 2007 the band broke up. They planned to release the demos from 2006 and 2007 in the near future. As of 2008, Heiðarsson reformed the band. In 2010, Changer released their third full-length album, Darkling.

In 2021, the band got back together for a reunion show and following a studio session and released their first song in 12 years in early 2021. They released the EP Pledge of the Dying in 2022.

== Band members ==
- Kristján B. Heiðarsson – drums (1999–2007, 2008–present)
- Hörður Halldórsson – guitar (2000–2005, 2008–present)
- Magnús Halldór Pálsson - bass guitar (2022-present)
- Hlynur Örn Zophaníasson - vocals (2022-present)
- Óskar Rúnarsson – guitar (2022-present)

=== Former members ===
- Jóhann Ingi Sigurðsson – guitar (2000–2007)
- Valdimar Olsen - guitar (2000)
- Snorri Óttarsson – bass guitar (2000–2001)
- Engilbert Hauksson – bass guitar (2001–2005)
- Magnús Atli Magnússon – vocals (2001–2005)
- Gísli Sigmundsson – bass guitar, vocals (2005–2007)
- Fannar Þórsson – guitar (2005–2006)
- Egill Geirsson – vocals (2005–2007)
- Unnar Sigurðsson – guitar (2006–2007)
- Atli Jarl Martin – vocals, bass guitar (2008–2009)
- Rob-D – guitar (2008–2015)
- Haraldur Anton Skúlason - vocals (2009–2011)
- Arnar M. Ellertsson – bass guitar (2009–2014)

=== Session members ===
- Magnús Halldór Pálsson - bass guitar (2001, 2020-2022)
- Hörður Ólafsson – bass guitar, vocals (2005)
- Jón Karl Jónsson – bass guitar (2007)
- Atli Jarl Martin – vocals (2009)
- Unnar Sigurðsson – guitar (2020-2022)
- Ingólfur Ólafsson – vocals (2020)

== Discography ==
=== Albums ===
- January 109 (2000)
- Scenes (2004)
- Darkling (2010)

=== EPs ===
- Inconsistency (2001)
- Breed the Lies (2006)
- Pledge of the Dying (2022)

=== Singles ===
- Three to One (2021)
