= Chang (monster) =

Undead Chinese tiger slave

- Traditional Chinese: 倀
- Simplified Chinese: 伥
Transcriptions
Standard Mandarin
- Hanyu Pinyin: chāng
- Wade–Giles: ch'ang

A chang is a kind of Chinese ghost or zombie who lures others to their death. Most often, changs are the spirits of those killed by tigers, enslaved by the beast that killed them and unable to find release until they find a new victim for the tiger, who then takes their place. In some tellings, the chang performs a similar role after drowning. It was described in Tang Peizheng's Song-era Taiping Guangji. A similar creature in Korea is called the changgwi (창귀).

The chang appears in the Chinese idioms "act the chang for the tiger" (為虎作倀, 为虎作伥, "to help evil people") and "wolves can't go without beis and tigers can't bite without changs" (狼無狽不行，虎無倀不噬, 狼无狈不行，虎无伥不噬, "evil people can't succeed on their own").
