= Shisanling (town) =

Town located in Beijing, China

Shisanling Town 十三陵镇
- Town
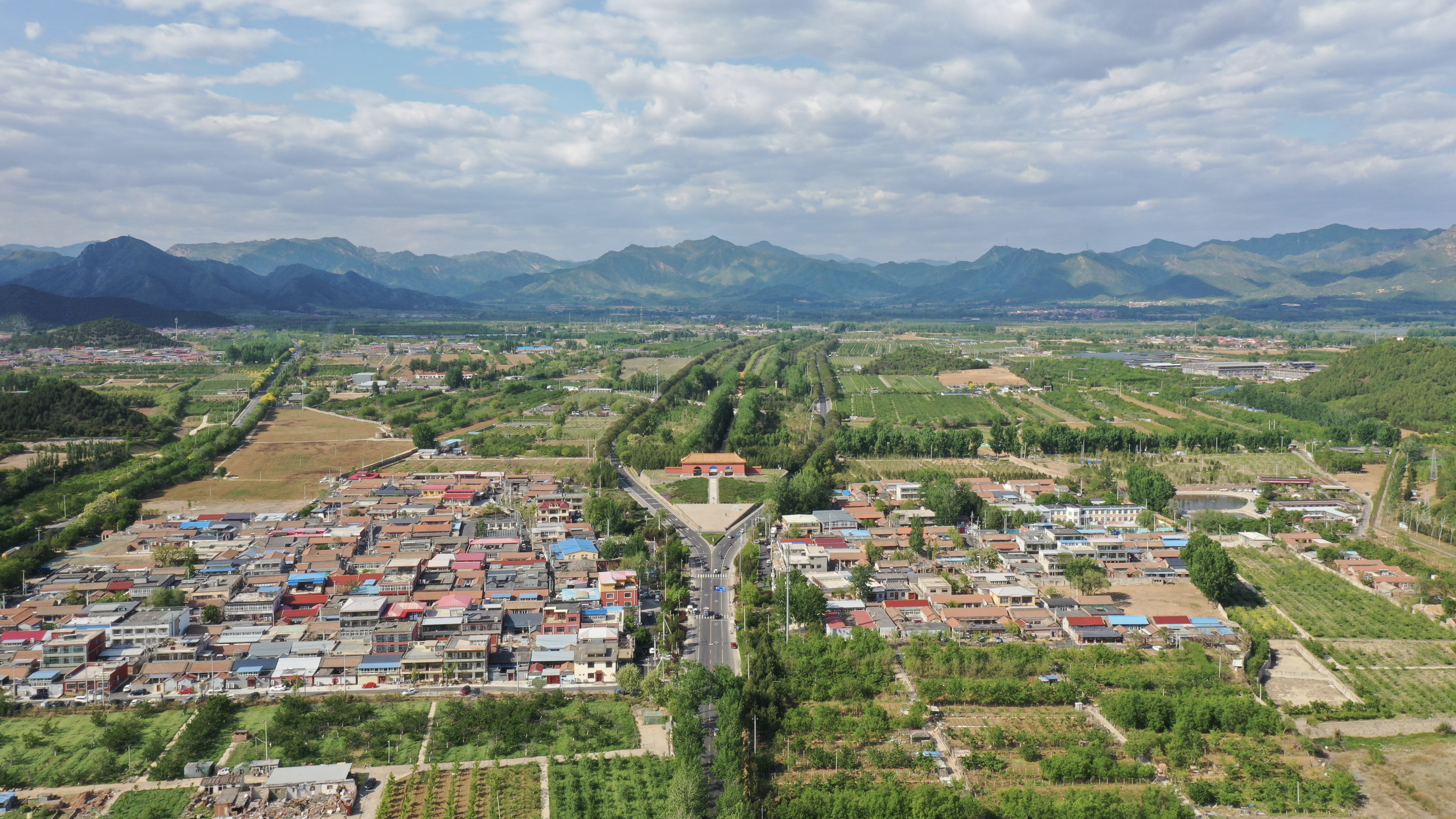
- Aerial View of Dagongmen Village within Shisanling, 2022

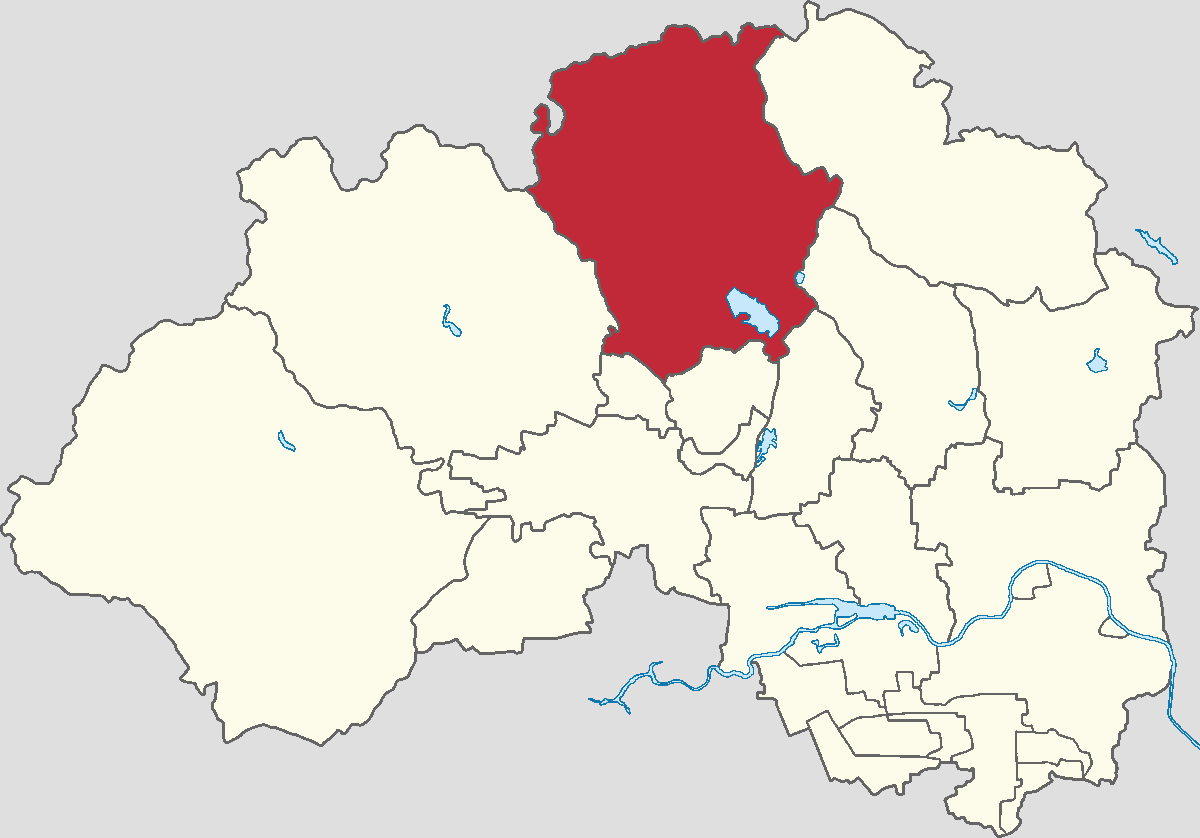
- Location of Shisanling Town in Changping District

- Location within Beijing Location within China
- Coordinates: 40°16′13″N 116°13′31″E
- Country: China
- Municipality: Beijing
- District: Changping
- Village-level Divisions: 2 communities 38 villages

Area
  - Total: 159.8 km^{2} (61.7 sq mi)
- Elevation: 113 m (371 ft)

Population (2020)
  - Total: 34,085
  - Density: 213.3/km^{2} (552.4/sq mi)
- Time zone: UTC+8 (China Standard)
- Postal code: 102213
- Area code: 010

Shisanling Town (simplified Chinese: 十三陵镇; traditional Chinese: 十三陵鎮; pinyin: Shísānlíng Zhèn) is a town located in the northern part of Changping District, Beijing, China. Situated at the immediate south of Taihang Mountain Range, Shisanling shares border with Jingzhuang Town and Dazhuangke Township in the north, Yanshou Town in the east, Cuicun and Nanshao Towns in the southeast, Chengbei and Chengnan Subdistricts in the south, and Nankou Town in the west. In 2020, census counted 34,085 residents living within the town.

The name of the town refers to the 13 Ming tombs within the administrative boundary of the town.

== History ==
Timetable of Shisanling Town
Year	Status	Under
1940 - 1945	3rd District	Changyan United County
1945 - 1948	1st District 2nd District	Changping County
1948 - 1949	1st District	Changshun County
1949 - 1950	1st District 2nd District	Changping County
1950 - 1956	1st District 9th District	Changping County
1956 - 1958	Changling Township	Changping County
1958 - 1961	Shisanling People's Commune	Changping County
1961 - 1963	Tailingyuan People's Commune Changling People's Commune Tailing People's Commune	Changping County
1963 - 1966	Shisanling People's Commune Changling People's Commune Tailing People's Commune	Changping County
1966 - 1982	Shisanling People's Commune Changling People's Commune	Changping County
1982 - 1997	Shisanling Farm Changling Township	Changping County
1997 - 1998	Shisanling Farm Changling Town	Changping County
1998 - 1999	Shisanling Township Changling Town	Changping County
1999 - 2011	Shisanling Town Changling Town	Changping District
2011–present	Shisanling Town	Changping District

== Administrative divisions ==
By 2021, Shisanling Town was composed of 40 subdivisions, with 2 communities, and 38 villages:

Administrative division code	Subdivision names	Name transliteration	Type
110114119001	北新村社区	Beixincunsheqv	Community
110114119002	十三陵胡庄社区	Shisanlinghuzhuangsheqv	Community
110114119201	胡庄村	Huzhuangcun	Village
110114119202	石牌坊村	Shipaifangcun	Village
110114119203	涧头村	Jiantoucun	Village
110114119204	大宫门村	Dagongmencun	Village
110114119205	仙人洞村	Xiantiandongcun	Village
110114119206	南新村	Nanxincun	Village
110114119207	西山口村	Xishankoucun	Village
110114119208	长陵园村	Changlingyuancun	Village
110114119209	康陵园村	Kanglingyuancun	Village
110114119210	小宫门村	Xiaogongmencun	Village
110114119211	王庄村	Wangzhuangcun	Village
110114119212	泰陵园村	Tailingyuancun	Village
110114119213	悼陵监村	Zhuolingjiancun	Village
110114119214	万娘坟村	Wanniangfencun	Village
110114119215	德胜口村	Deshengkoucun	Village
110114119216	果庄村	Guozhuangcun	Village
110114119217	景陵村	Jinglingcun	Village
110114119218	德陵村	Delingcun	Village
110114119219	永陵村	Yonglingcun	Village
110114119220	昭陵村	Zhaolingcun	Village
110114119221	献陵村	Xianlingcun	Village
110114119222	长陵村	Changlingcun	Village
110114119223	东水峪村	Dongshuiyucun	Village
110114119224	庆陵村	Qinglingcun	Village
110114119225	裕陵村	Yulingcun	Village
110114119226	老君堂村	Laojuntangcun	Village
110114119227	黄泉寺村	Huangquansicun	Village
110114119228	茂陵村	Maolingcun	Village
110114119229	燕子口村	Yanzikoucun	Village
110114119230	康陵村	Kanglingcun	Village
110114119231	泰陵村	Tailingcun	Village
110114119232	石头园村	Shitouyuancun	Village
110114119233	锥石口村	Zhuishikoucun	Village
110114119234	麻峪房村	Mayufangcun	Village
110114119235	下口村	Xiakoucun	Village
110114119236	上口村	Shangkoucun	Village
110114119237	碓臼峪村	Duijiuyucun	Village
110114119238	大岭沟村	Dalinggoucun	Village

== Landmark ==
- Ming tombs

== Gallery ==
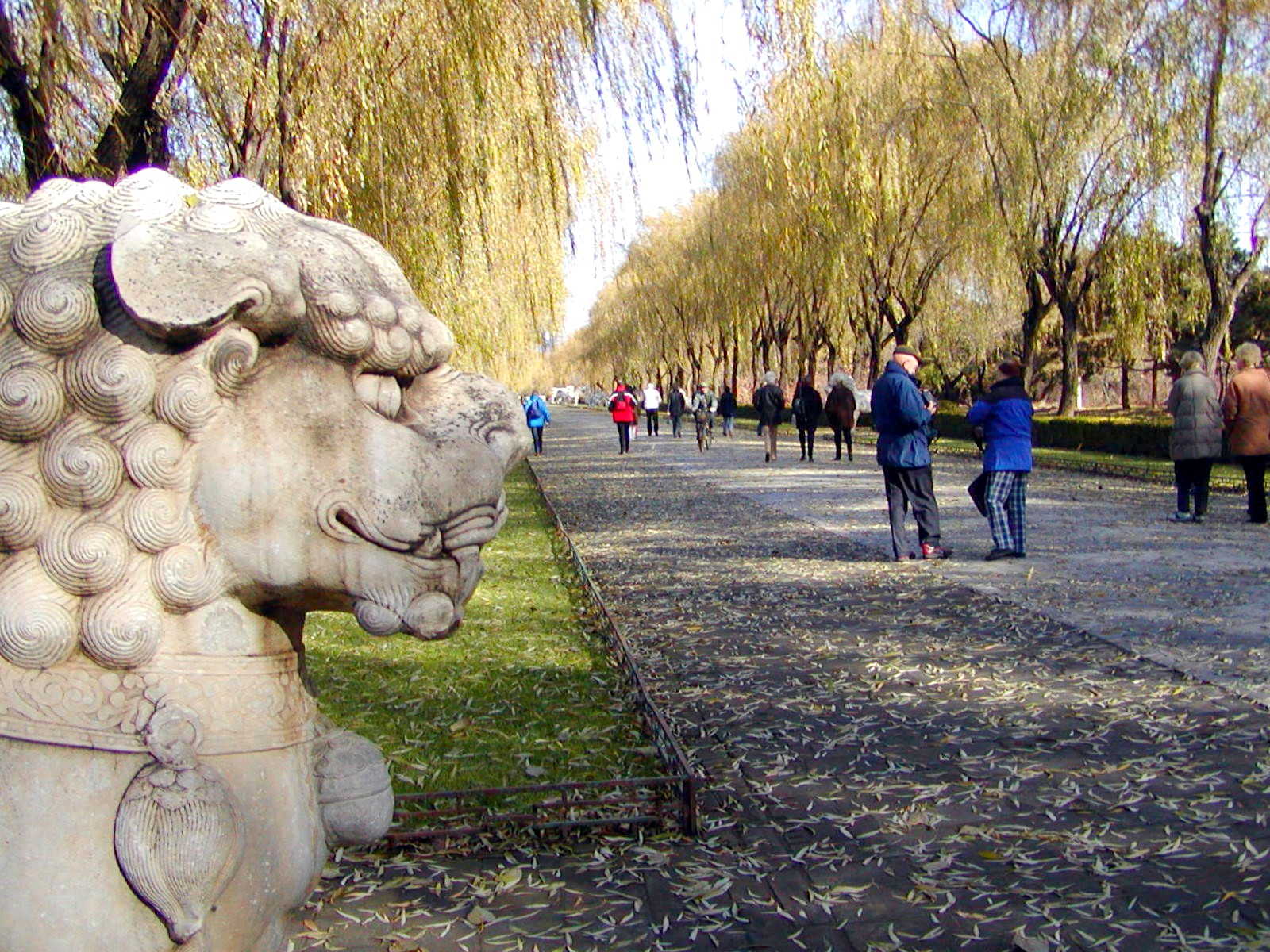
Sacred Road of Ming Tombs, 2003

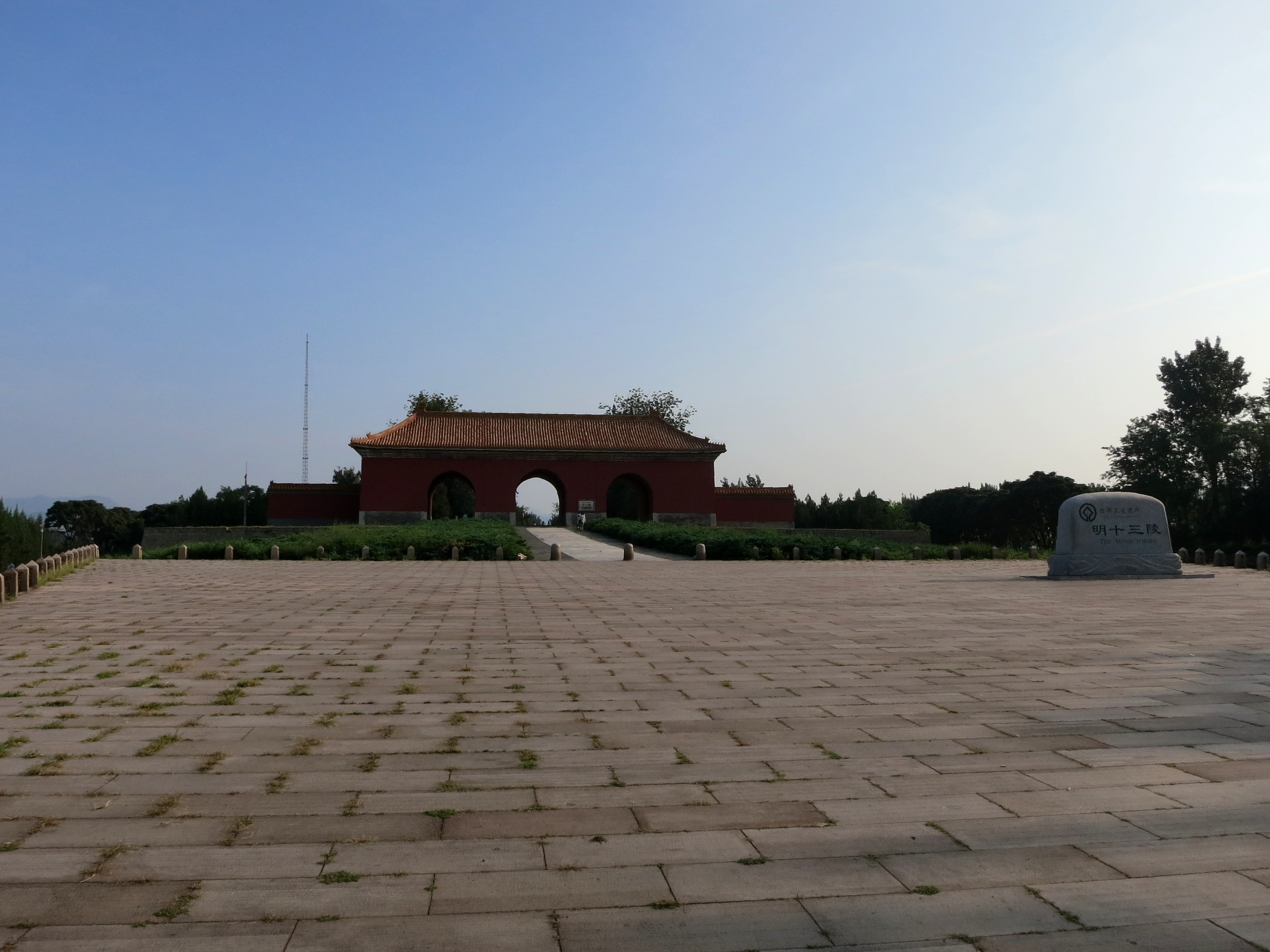
Great Palace Gate, 2015

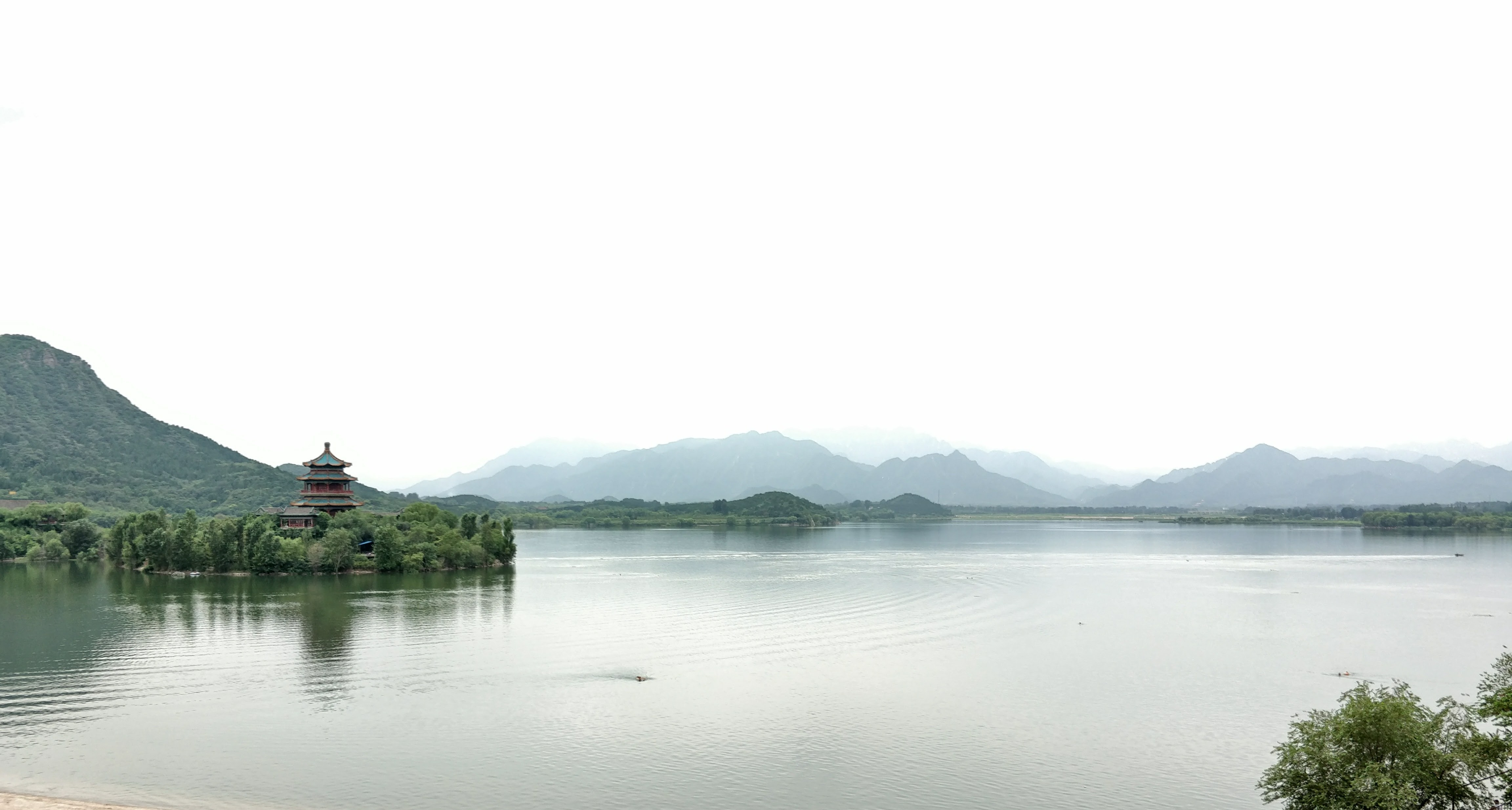
Shisanling Reservoir, 2017

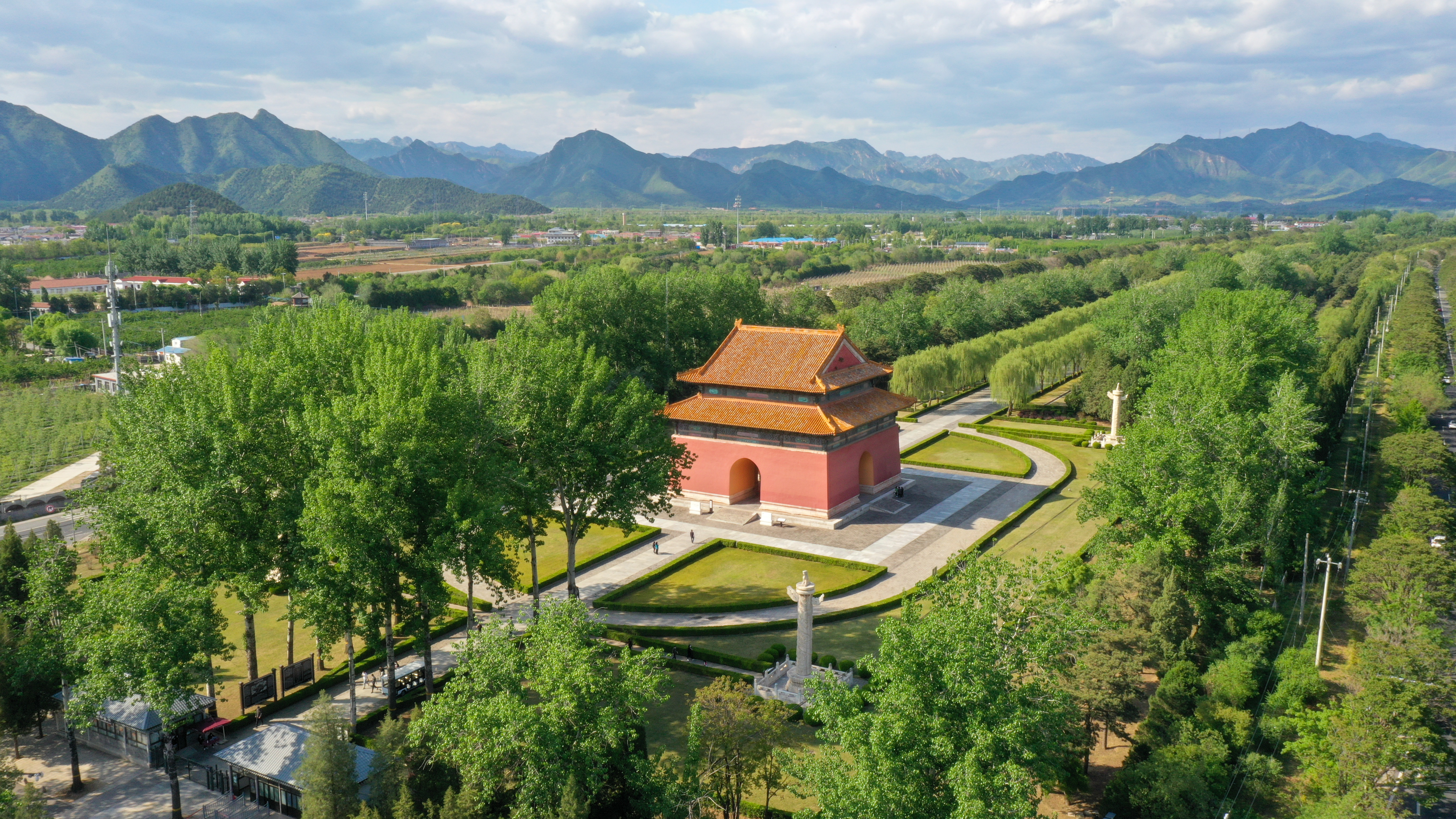
Emperor Pavilion, 2022

== See also ==
- List of township-level divisions of Beijing
