= Chang Ping =

Chinese writer and journalist (born 1968)

- 长平
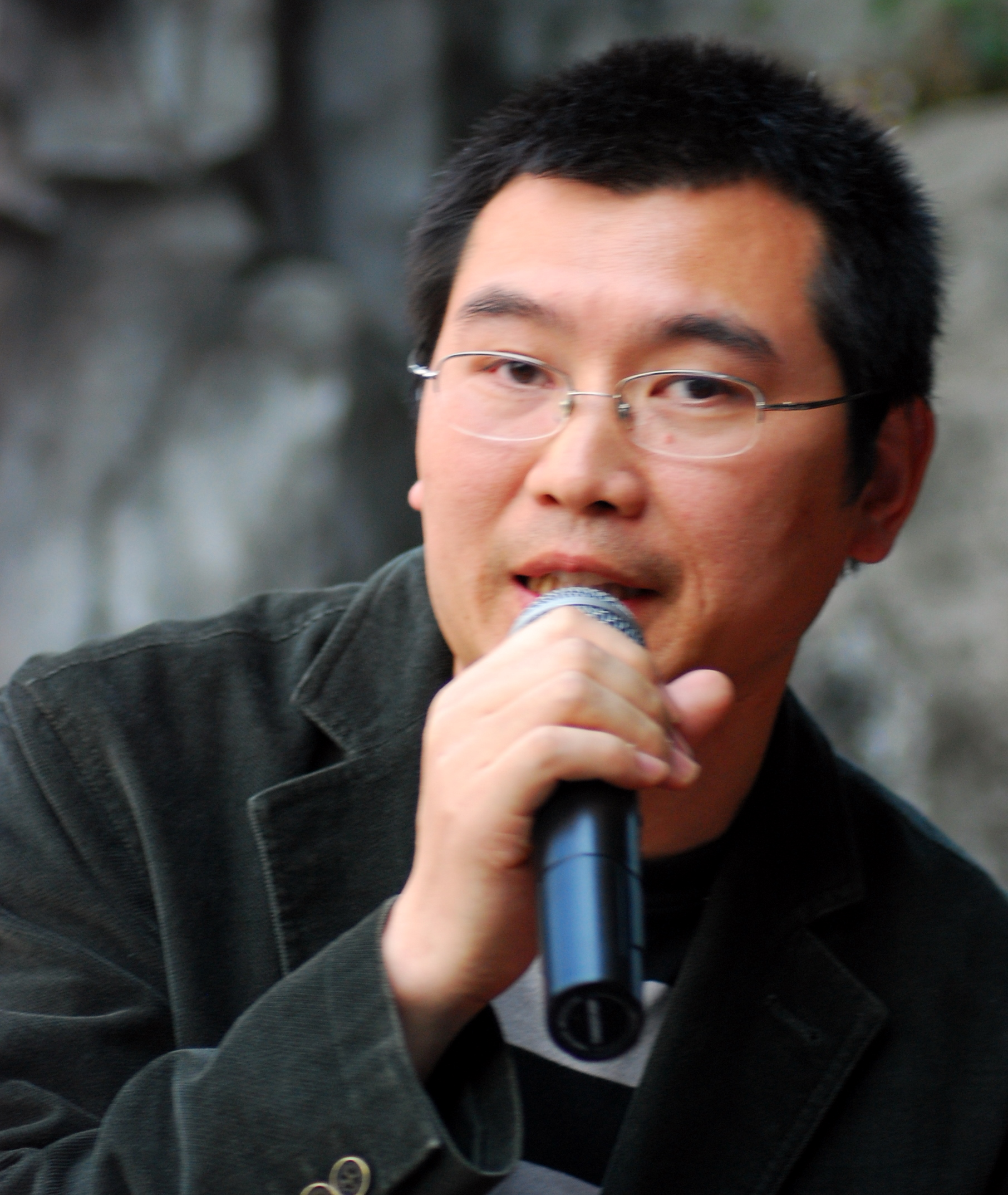
- Born: Zhang Ping; 22 June 1968 (age 58); Sichuan, China
- Occupations: Writer, Journalist and Curator of June 4th Museum of Memory and Human Rights
- Writing career
- Subjects: Democracy, media censorship, the failures of government policy and Tibet
- Notable awards: Human Rights Press Awards, International Press Freedom Award

Chang Ping (simplified Chinese: 长平; traditional Chinese: 長平, born 22 June 1968), born Zhang Ping, is a Chinese writer, and currently curator of the June 4th Museum of Memory and Human Rights in Hong Kong. He is human rights activist and advocate; he was awarded at the Hong Kong Human Rights Press Awards in 2014, and received an international press freedom award from the Canadian Journalists for Free Expression (CJFE) in 2016.

Chang Ping has written on topics including democracy, media censorship, government policy, and Tibet. His writings have appeared in publications including Southern Weekend, South China Morning Post, Apple Daily, Deutsche Welle, Süddeutsche Zeitung, and The New York Times.

== Career ==
Chang Ping has been a frequent target of censorship for his writing, and was banned from writing columns and publishing books in China. He was removed as news director of Southern Weekly in 2001. He became deputy editor of Southern Metropolis Weekly but was removed in 2008, due to a comment piece carrying the headline "Tibet: Nationalist Sentiment and the Truth", which met with backlash from Chinese nationalists who supported the government's crackdown on pro-independence activists in Tibet. In 2010, he was fired by the newspaper, with his work described as "inappropriate" by an editor, but he told the New York Times in an interview that he would continue writing.

Chang Ping joined Hong Kong-based magazine iSun Affairs in 2011 as chief editor, but was denied a visa and has not been allowed into Hong Kong. In late 2011, Chang Ping was invited to live in Germany at the former country home of Nobel Prize winner Heinrich Böll, which has been converted into a refuge for persecuted writers.

On 15 November 2014, Chang Ping lectured at the 33rd anniversary of PEN International's Day of the Imprisoned Writer to highlight the fate of Tibetan writers imprisoned by Chinese authorities in Dharamsala, India.

In March 2016, Chang Ping alleged that his two younger brothers and a younger sister had been abducted by Chinese police after he wrote an article for Deutsche Welle about a "public letter" published online, calling for the resignation of Communist Party general secretary Xi Jinping.

Chang Ping was a guest professor at the East China University of Political Science and Law and a senior research fellow at the Southern Metropolis Communication Institute in Guangzhou. In a lecture at Fudan University, he said China should "transform into a civil society rather than wait for a virtuous leader."

Chang Ping has been a longtime observer of the Chinese feminist movement. He wrote a series of articles expressing his worry that the "Chinese Dream" spelled a setback for women's rights.
