= Changping station (Beijing Subway) =

Beijing subway station

Changping 昌平
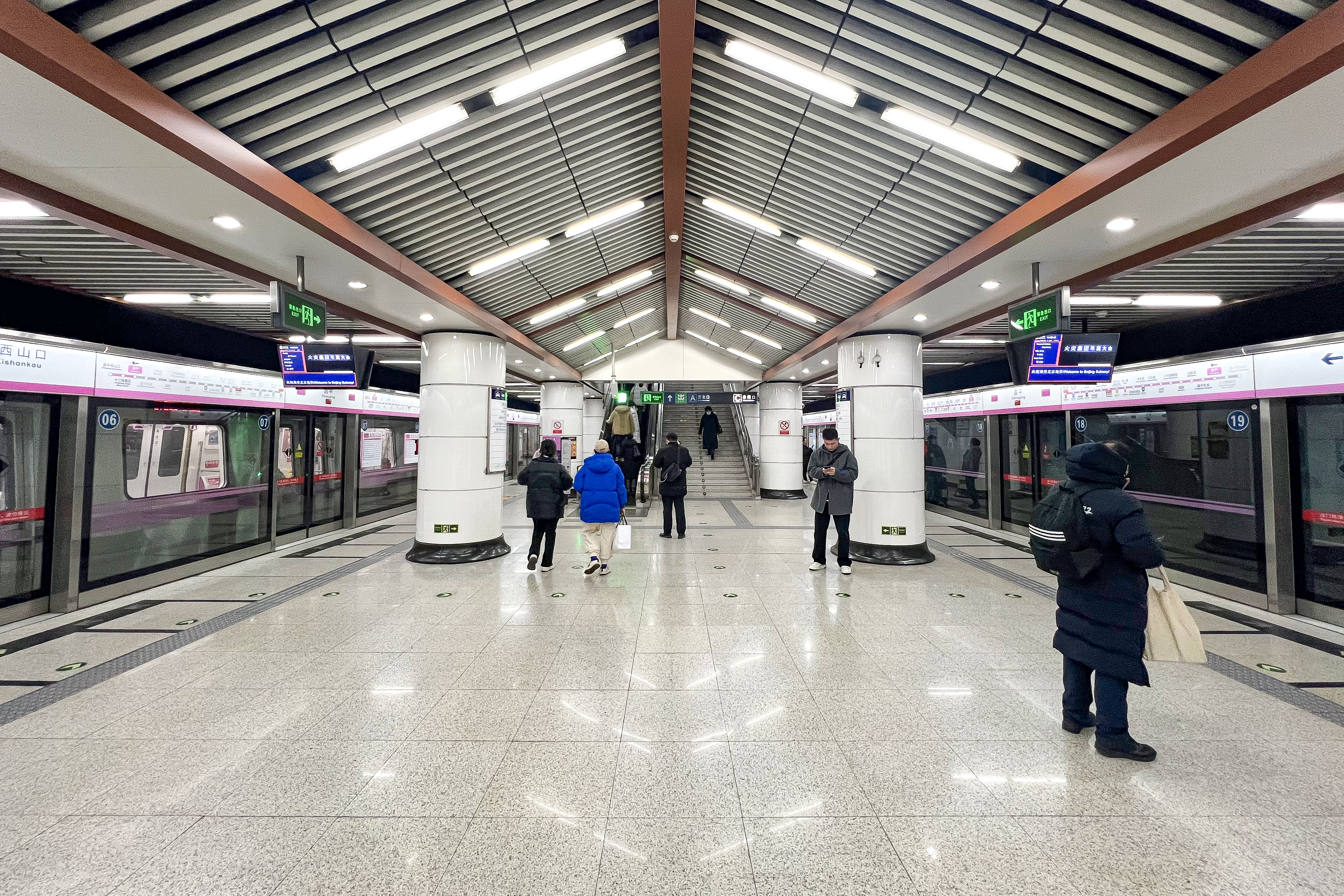
- Platform

General information
- Location: Zhengfu Street (政府街) and Gulou South Street (鼓楼南街); Chengbei Subdistrict, Changping District, Beijing; China
- Coordinates: 40°13′14″N 116°14′01″E
- Operator: Beijing Mass Transit Railway Operation Corporation Limited
- Line: Changping line
- Platforms: 2 (1 island platform)
- Tracks: 2

Construction
- Structure type: Underground
- Accessible: Yes

History
- Opened: December 26, 2015; 10 years ago

Services
Preceding station	Beijing Subway	Following station
Ming Tombs towards Changping Xishankou	Changping line	Changping Dongguan towards Jimen Qiao
Location
- Location within Beijing

Changping station (Chinese: 昌平站; pinyin: Chāngpíng zhàn) is a station on the Changping Line of the Beijing Subway. It was opened on 26 December 2015.

== Station layout ==
The station has an underground island platform.

== Exits ==
There are two exits, lettered A and C. Exit C is accessible.
