= List of country music performers =

This is an alphabetical list of country music performers. It includes artists who played country music at some point in their career, even if they were not exclusively country music performers.

== 0-9 ==
- 3 of Hearts
- 4 Runner
- 8 Ball Aitken
- 38 Special

== A ==
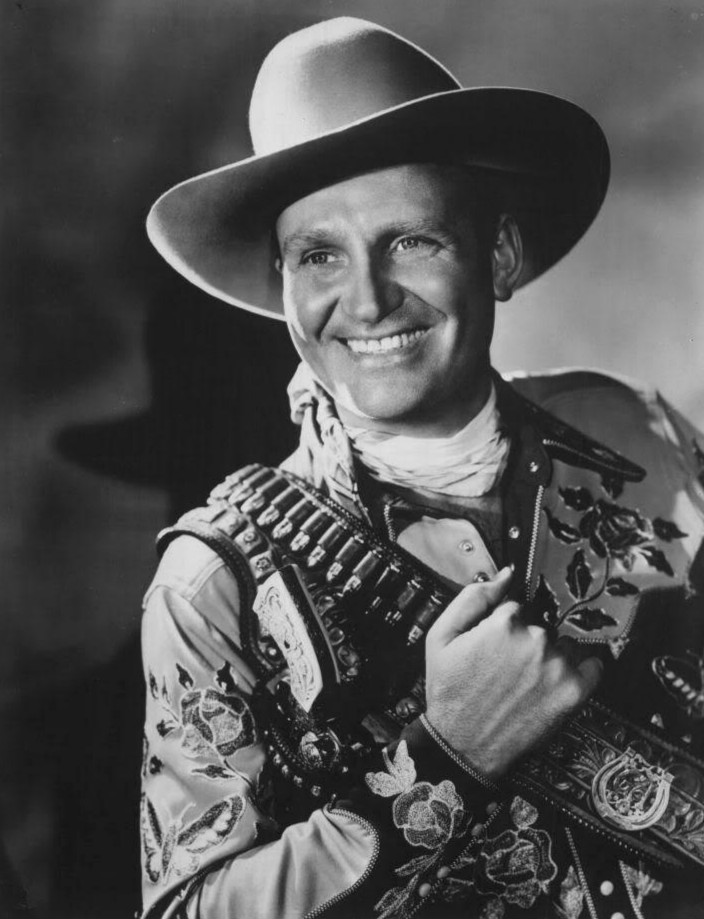
Gene Autry

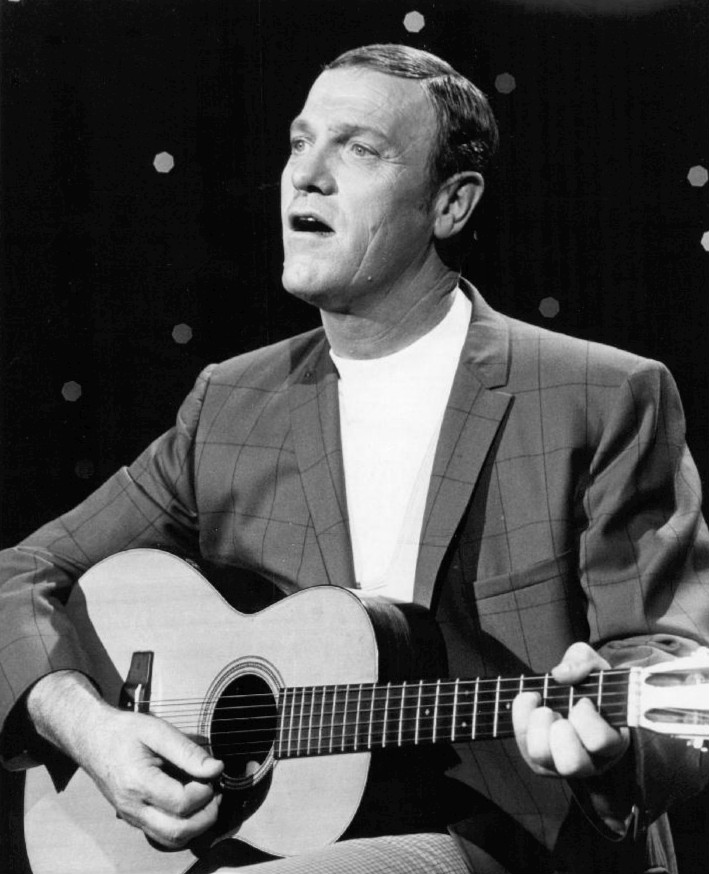
Eddy Arnold

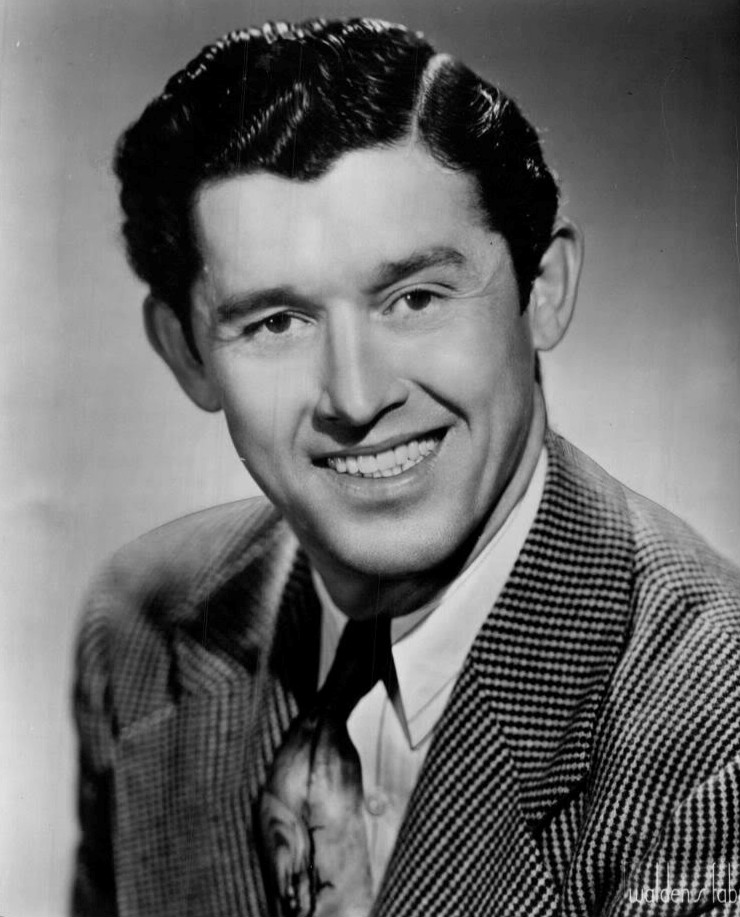
Roy Acuff

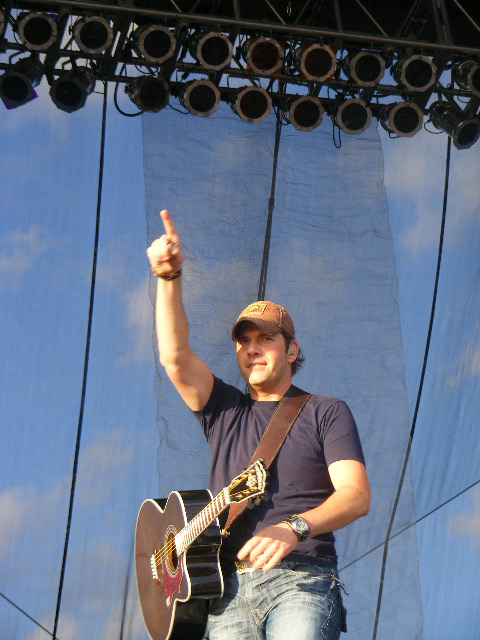
Rodney Atkins

- The Abrams Brothers
- Ace in the Hole Band
- Roy Acuff (1903–1992)
- Kay Adams (born 1941)
- Ryan Adams (born 1974)
- Gavin Adcock (born 1998)
- Doug Adkins (born 1963)
- Trace Adkins (born 1962)
- David "Stringbean" Akeman (1915–1973)
- Rhett Akins (born 1969)
- Alabama
- Lauren Alaina (born 1994)
- Jason Aldean (born 1977)
- Walt Aldridge (1955–2025)
- Alee (born 1992)
- Daniele Alexander (born 1954)
- Jessi Alexander (born 1976)
- Gary Allan (born 1967)
- Susie Allanson (born 1952)
- Deborah Allen (born 1953)
- Duane Allen (born 1943)
- Harley Allen (1956–2011)
- Jimmie Allen (born 1985)
- Rex Allen (1920–1999)
- Terry Allen (born 1943)
- Allman Brothers Band
- Gregg Allman (1947–2017)
- Tommy Alverson
- Dave Alvin
- Amazing Rhythm Aces
- American Young
- Don Amero
- Colin Amey
- Al Anderson (born 1947)
- Bill Anderson (born 1937)
- Brent Anderson (born 1988)
- Coffey Anderson
- John Anderson (1954–2026)
- Keith Anderson (born 1968)
- Liz Anderson (1927–2011)
- Lynn Anderson (1947–2015)
- Sharon Anderson
- Elisabeth Andreassen (born 1958)
- Ingrid Andress (born 1991)
- Courtney Marie Andrews
- Jessica Andrews (born 1983)
- Sheila Andrews (1953–1984)
- Lisa Angelle (born 1965)
- Avery Anna (born 2004)
- Michaela Anne
- Maggie Antone (born 2002)
- Lorenzo Antonio (born 1969)
- Archer/Park
- Katie Armiger (born 1991)
- Eddy Arnold (1918–2008)
- Ashley Arrison
- Artists of Then, Now & Forever
- Tenille Arts (born 1994)
- Leon Ashley (1936–2013)
- Kassi Ashton (born 1994)
- Susan Ashton (born 1967)
- Ernest Ashworth (1928–2009)
- Asleep at the Wheel
- Chet Atkins (1924–2001)
- Rodney Atkins (born 1969)
- Audrey Auld-Mezera
- Bryan Austin (born 1967)
- Julian Austin (born 1963)
- Shawn Austin
- Sherrié Austin (born 1970)
- Gene Autry (1907–1998)
- Autumn Hill
- Avicii (1989–2018)
- Hoyt Axton (1938–1999)
- Steve Azar (born 1964)

== B ==
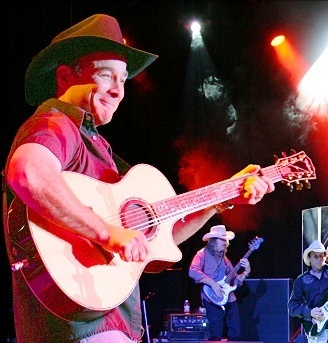
Clint Black

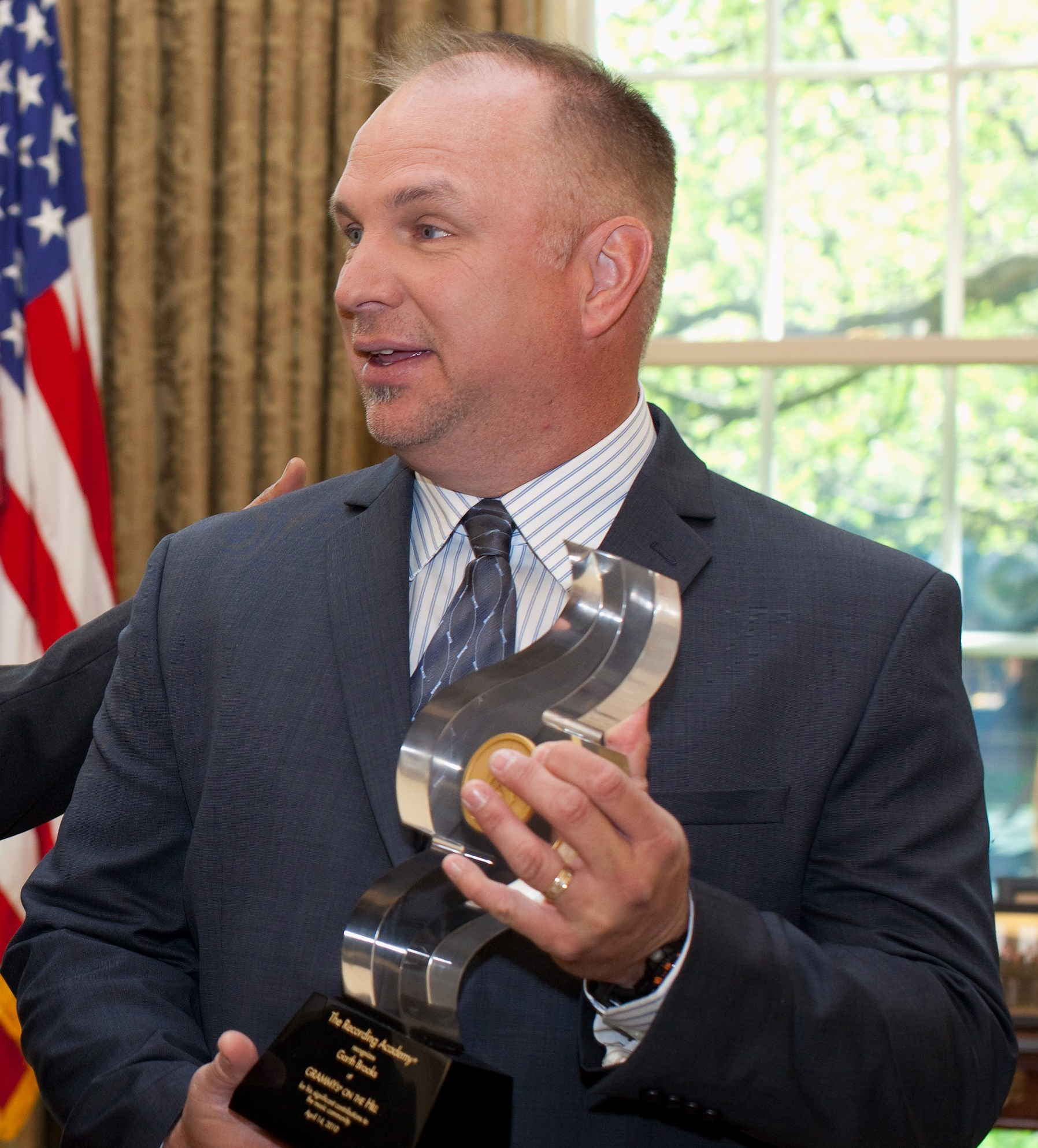
Garth Brooks

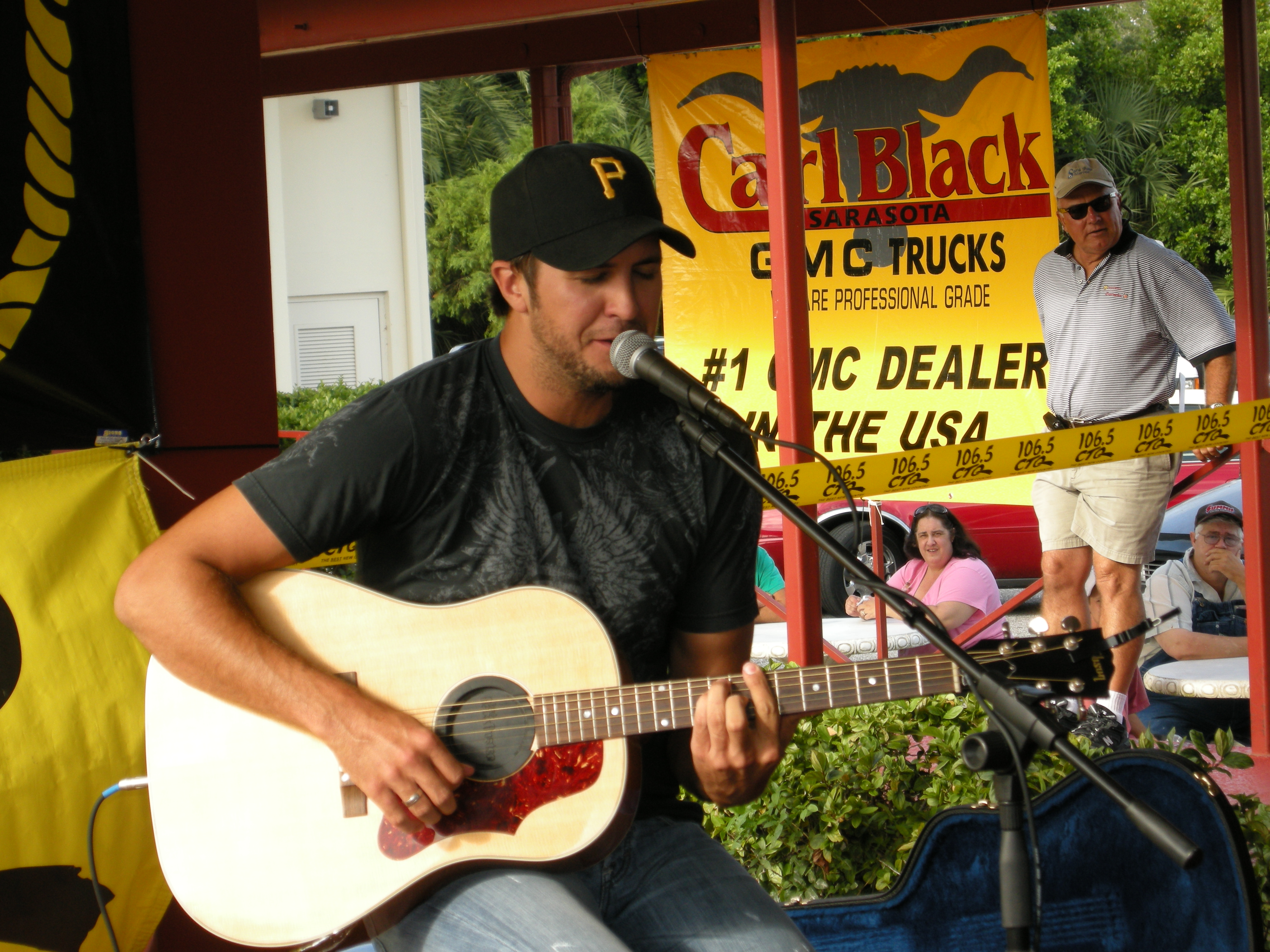
Luke Bryan

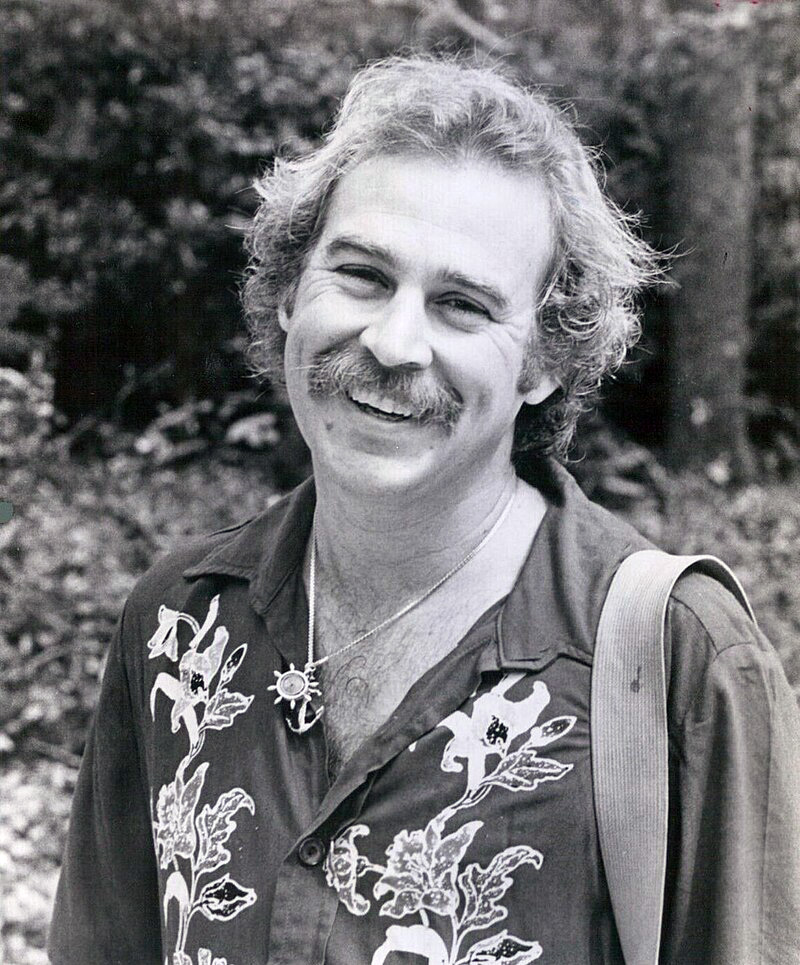
Jimmy Buffett

- Barrett Baber (born 1980)
- Backstreet Boys
- Bacon Brothers
- DeFord Bailey (1899–1982)
- Razzy Bailey (1939–2021)
- Baillie & The Boys
- Rachel Baiman
- Rob Baird
- Baker & Myers
- Kaitlyn Baker
- Sam Baker
- Drew Baldridge (born 1991)
- David Ball (born 1953)
- Frankie Ballard (born 1983)
- Roger Ballard
- Kelsea Ballerini (born 1993)
- Veronica Ballestrini (born 1991)
- The Bama Band
- Gord Bamford (born 1976)
- The Band
- The Band of Heathens
- The Band Perry
- Bandana
- Moe Bandy (born 1944)
- Victoria Banks (born 1973)
- Kelleigh Bannen
- Del Barber (born 1983)
- Sam Barber (born 2003)
- Bobby Bare (born 1935)
- Aaron Barker (born 1953)
- James Barker Band
- Danny Barnes
- Mandy Barnett (born 1975)
- Joe Barnhill (born 1965)
- Gabby Barrett (born 2000)
- Greg Bates (born 1987)
- Jeff Bates (born 1963)
- Karen Lee Batten
- Tucker Beathard (born 1995)
- Ryan Beaver
- Chayce Beckham (born 1996)
- Bekka & Billy
- Carl Belew (1931–1990)
- Luke Bell (1990–2022)
- The Bellamy Brothers
- Clayton Bellamy
- Laura Benanti (born 1979)
- Hailey Benedict
- Richard Bennett
- Jason Benoit
- Ray Benson (born 1951)
- Ridley Bent
- Dierks Bentley (born 1975)
- Stephanie Bentley (born 1963)
- Barbi Benton (born 1950)
- Aaron Benward (born 1973)
- Matraca Berg (born 1964)
- Bering Strait
- Crystal Bernard (born 1961)
- John Berry (born 1959)
- Dickey Betts (1943-2024)
- Beyoncé (born 1981)
- Bo Bice (born 1975)
- Craig Bickhardt born (1954)
- Justin Bieber (born 1994)
- Big & Rich
- The Big Bopper (1930–1959)
- Big House
- Big Kenny (born 1963)
- Big Smo
- Big Tom (1936–2018)
- Bill Haley & His Comets
- Billy Hill
- Ryan Bingham
- Scott H. Biram
- George Birge (born 1987)
- Jaydee Bixby
- Maggie Björklund
- Clint Black (born 1962)
- Lisa Hartman Black (born 1956)
- The Black Lillies
- Black Tie
- Blackberry Smoke
- Blackhawk
- Jason Blaine (born 1980)
- Blake & Brian
- Norman Blake
- Clay Blaker
- Priscilla Block (born 1995)
- Ron Block
- Jake Blount (born 1995)
- Blue County
- Blue Highway
- The Blue Moon Boys
- Blue Rodeo
- James Blundell
- Douwe Bob
- Suzy Bogguss (born 1956)
- Jason Boland & the Stragglers
- Bomshel
- James Bonamy (born 1972)
- Johnny Bond (1915–1978)
- Bobby Bones (born 1980)
- Bon Jovi
- Joe Bonsall (1948–2024)
- The Boom Chucka Boys
- Debby Boone (born 1956)
- Larry Boone (born 1956)
- Pat Boone (born 1934)
- Tony Booth
- Tyler Booth (born 1996)
- Annie Bosko
- Clare Bowen
- Wade Bowen
- Ash Bowers
- Crystal Bowersox (born 1985)
- Margie Bowes (1941–2020)
- Boxcar Willie (1931–1999)
- The Boxmasters
- Boy Howdy
- Bill 'Cowboy Rambler' Boyd (1914–1977)
- Craig Wayne Boyd
- BR549
- Danielle Bradbery (born 1996)
- Dale Ann Bradley
- Michelle Branch (born 1983)
- Adam Brand (born 1970)
- Paul Brandt (born 1972)
- Kippi Brannon (born 1966)
- Breland (born 1995)
- Lee Brice (born 1979)
- Jeff Bridges (born 1949)
- Logan Brill
- Catherine Britt (born 1984)
- Elton Britt (1913–1972)
- Connie Britton (born 1967)
- Chad Brock (born 1963)
- Dean Brody (born 1975)
- Lane Brody (born 1955)
- Lisa Brokop (born 1973)
- Garth Brooks (born 1962)
- Karen Brooks (born 1954)
- Kix Brooks (born 1955)
- Brooks & Dunn
- Brother Phelps
- The Bros. Landreth
- Brothers Osborne
- Brown & Gray
- Blanco Brown (born 1985)
- Buddy Brown (born 1982)
- Jim Ed Brown (1934–2015)
- Junior Brown (born 1952)
- Kane Brown (born 1993)
- Marty Brown (born 1965)
- Roger Brown
- Shannon Brown (born 1973)
- T. Graham Brown (born 1954)
- Tracey Brown
- Zac Brown (born 1978)
- Jann Browne (born 1954)
- Chad Brownlee (born 1984)
- The Browns
- Ed Bruce (1939–2021)
- Bailey Bryan
- Luke Bryan (born 1976)
- Zach Bryan (born 1996)
- Chase Bryant (born 1992)
- Felice and Boudleaux Bryant
- Jimmy Bryant
- Keith Bryant
- Laura Bryna
- The Buckaroos
- The Buffalo Club
- Buffalo Springfield
- Jimmy Buffett (1946–2023)
- Laura Bell Bundy (born 1981)
- John Bunzow (born 1951)
- The Burch Sisters
- Sinead Burgess
- Wilma Burgess (1939–2003)
- T Bone Burnett
- Billy Burnette (born 1953)
- Smiley Burnette (1911–1967)
- Burnin' Daylight
- Burns & Poe
- Gary Burr
- Sully Burrows (born 2006)
- Johnny Bush (1935–2020)
- Kristian Bush (born 1970)
- Sam Bush (born 1952)
- Carl Butler and Pearl
- Hillous Butrum (1928–2002)
- Sarah Buxton (born 1980)
- Jonathan Byrd
- Tracy Byrd (born 1966)
- Monty Byrom (born 1958)

== C ==
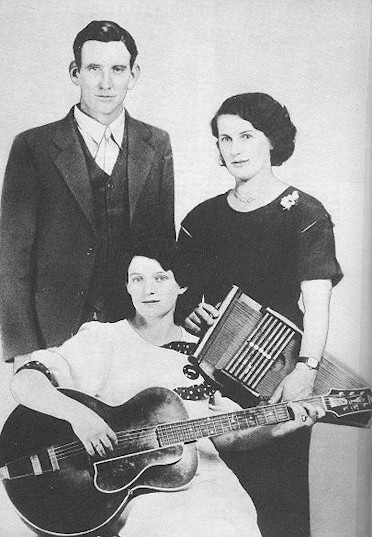
The Carter Family

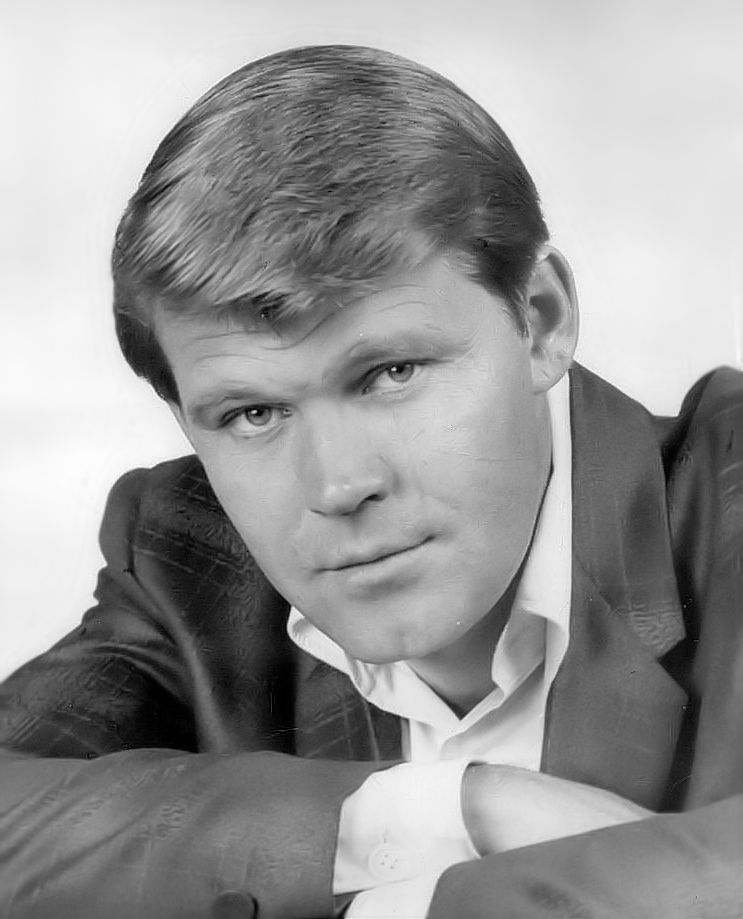
Glen Campbell

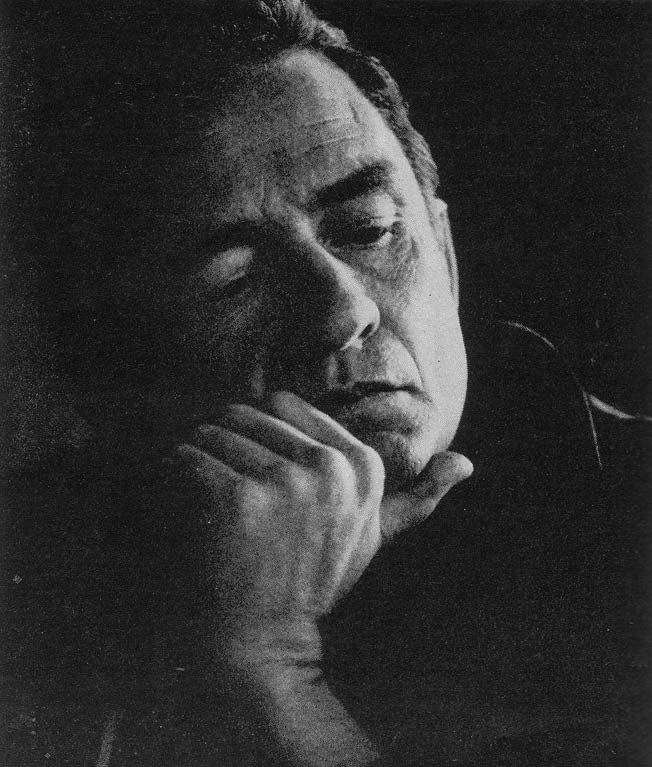
Johnny Cash

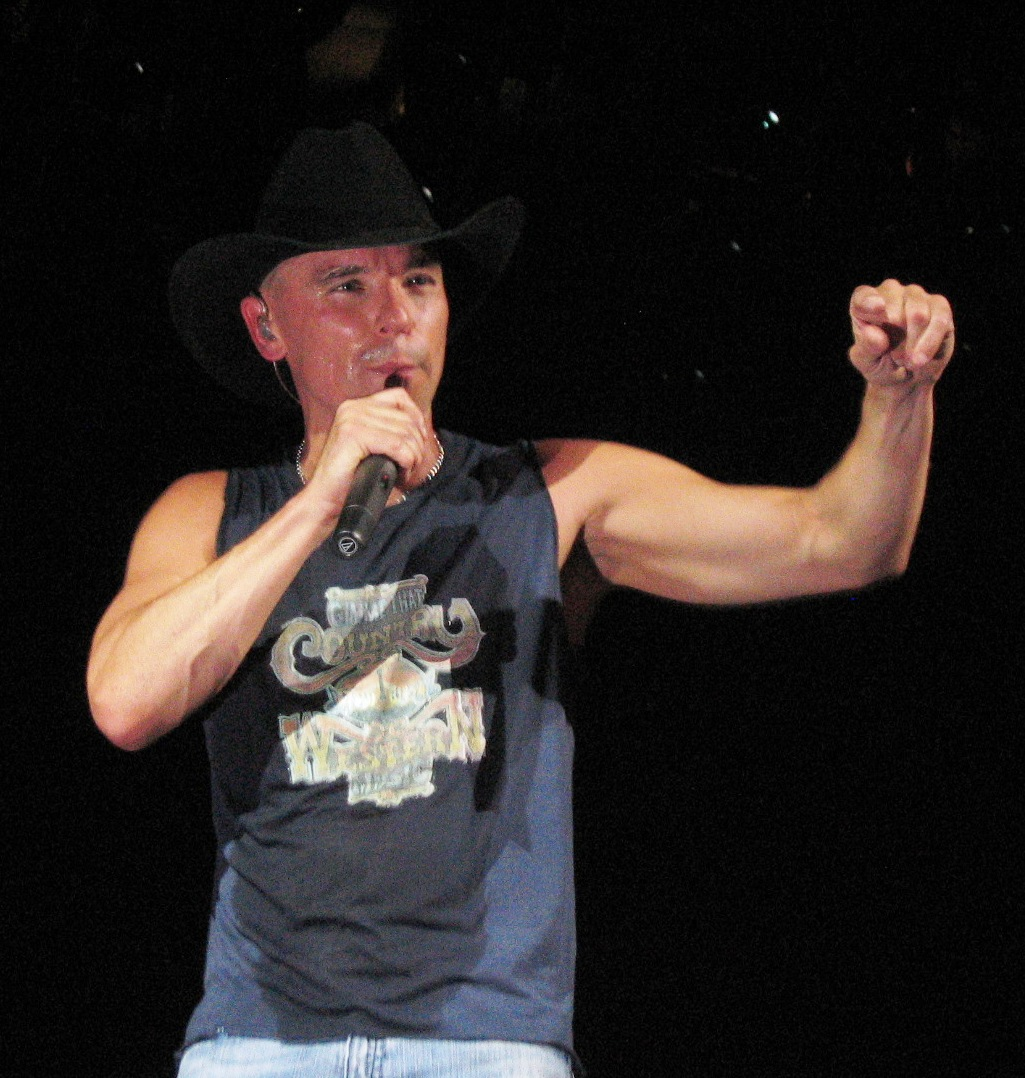
Kenny Chesney

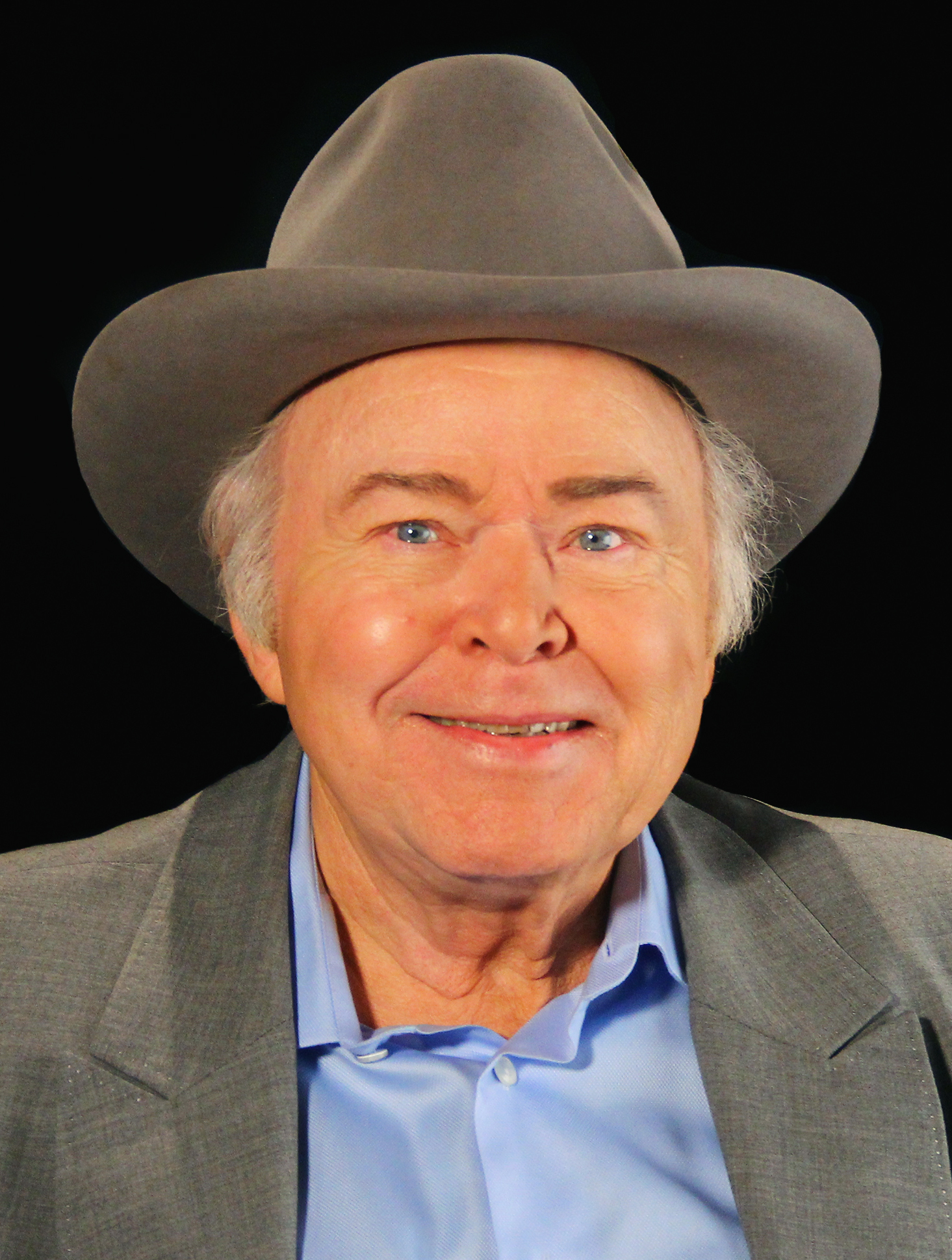
Roy Clark

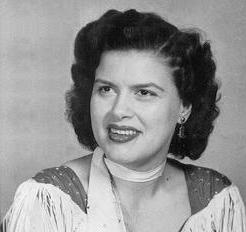
Patsy Cline

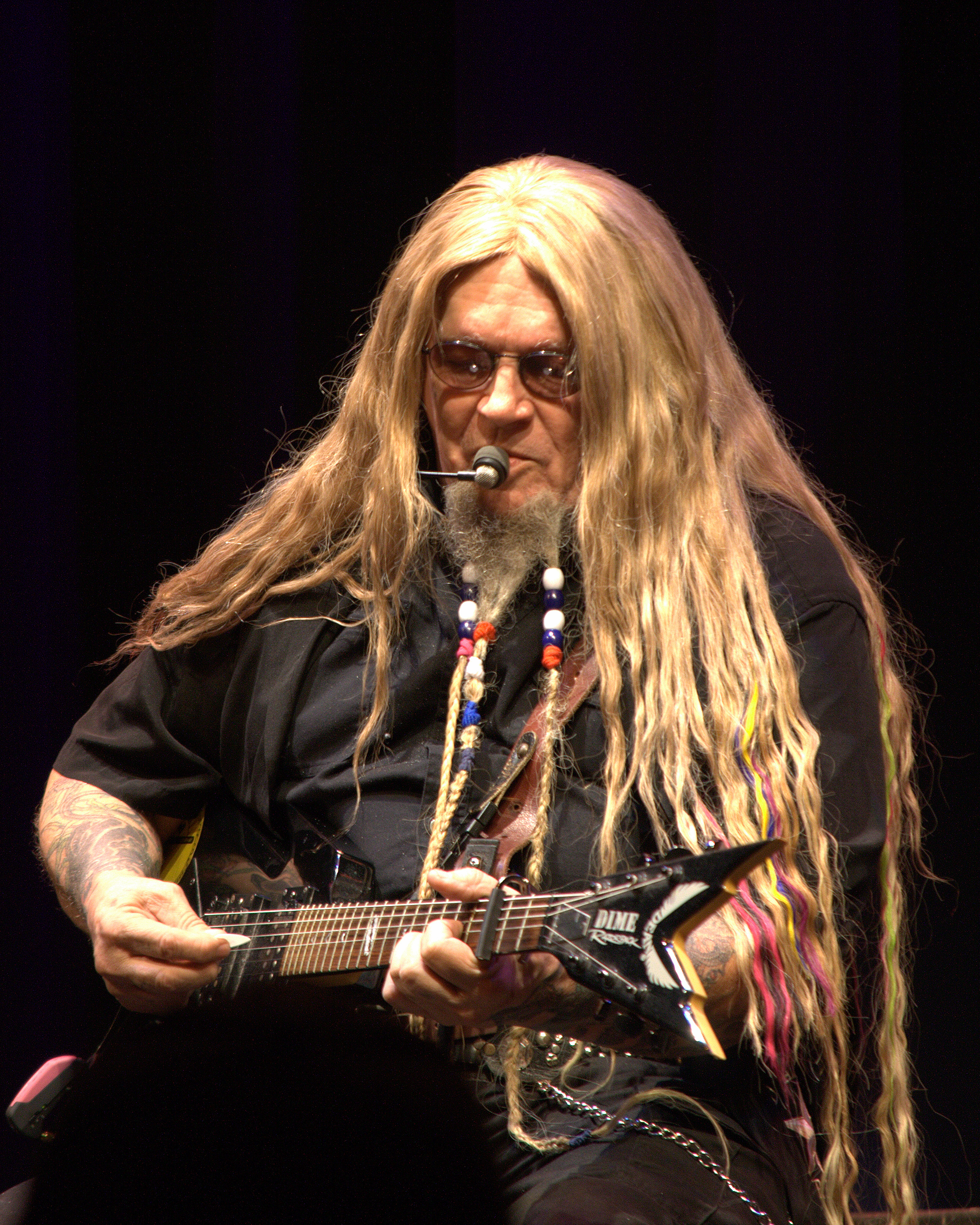
David Allan Coe

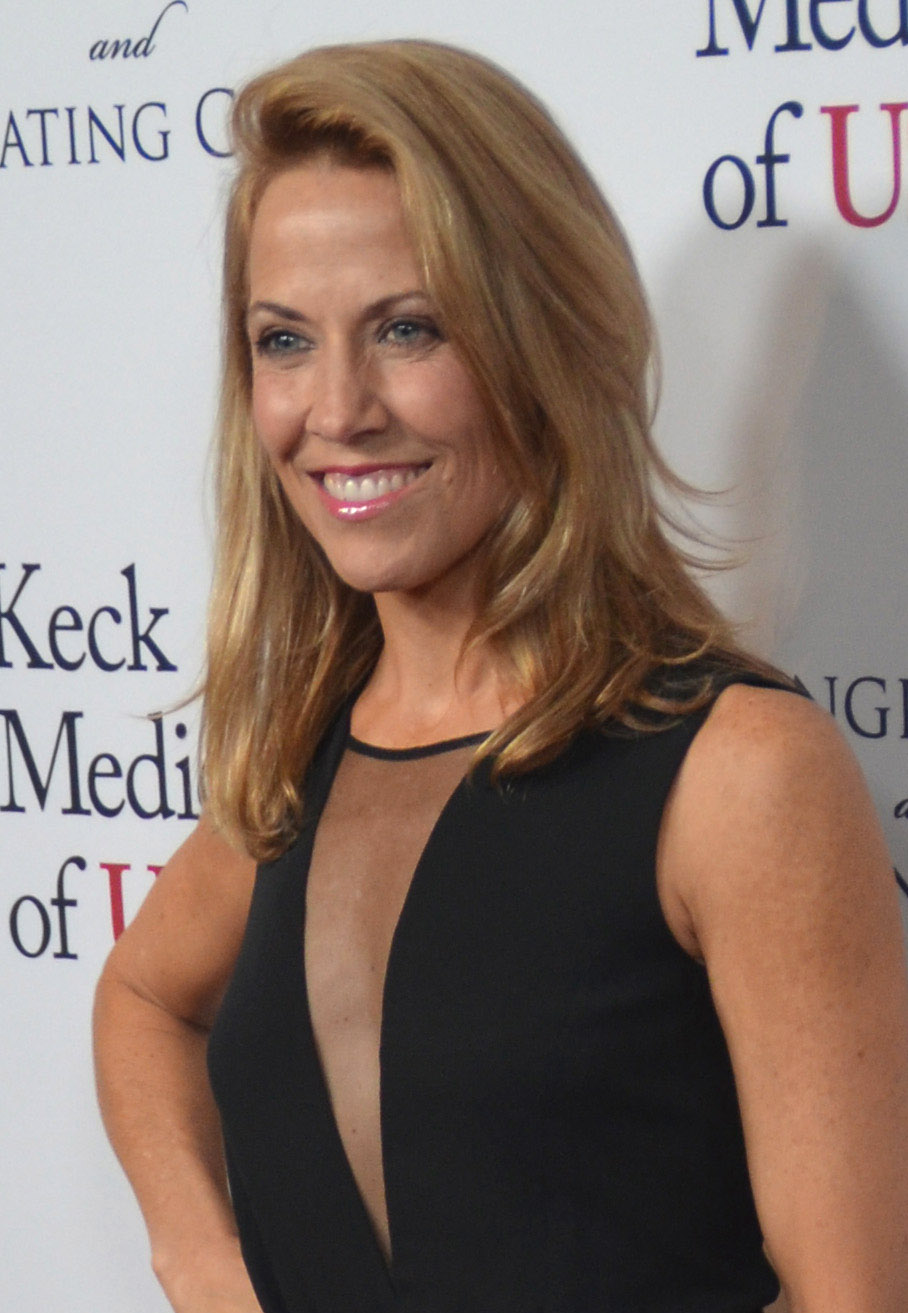
Sheryl Crow

- Cactus Choir
- The Cadillac Three
- Chris Cagle (born 1968)
- Al Caiola (1920–2016)
- Caitlin & Will
- Calamity Jane
- JJ Cale (1938–2013)
- Cam (born 1984)
- Shawn Camp (born 1966)
- Ashley Campbell (born 1986)
- Craig Campbell (born 1979)
- Glen Campbell (1936–2017)
- Kate Campbell
- Larry Campbell
- Stacy Dean Campbell (born 1967)
- Cody Canada (born 1976)
- Melonie Cannon
- Laura Cantrell (born 1967/1968)
- Canyon
- George Canyon (born 1970)
- Carbon Leaf
- Henson Cargill (1941–2007)
- Brandi Carlile (born 1981)
- Bill Carlisle (1908–2003)
- Cliff Carlisle (1903–1983)
- Hayes Carll
- Paulette Carlson (born 1952)
- Chris Carmack (born 1980)
- Dillon Carmichael (born 1993)
- Kim Carnes (born 1946)
- Carolina Rain
- Mary Chapin Carpenter (born 1958)
- Rodney Carrington (born 1968)
- Jason Michael Carroll (born 1978)
- Jeff Carson (1963–2022)
- Jenny Lou Carson (1915–1978)
- Fiddlin' John Carson
- The Carter Family
- The Carter Sisters
- A.P. Carter (1891–1960)
- Anita Carter (1933–1999)
- Carlene Carter (born 1955)
- Deana Carter (born 1966)
- James Carter (1925–2003)
- Janette Carter
- Maybelle Carter (1909–1978)
- Sara Carter (1898–1979)
- Wilf Carter (1904–1996)
- Caitlin Cary
- Carter's Chord
- Lionel Cartwright (born 1960)
- Troy Cartwright
- Johnny Carver
- Neko Case (born 1970)
- Bobby Cash (born 1961)
- John Carter Cash (born 1970)
- Johnny Cash (1932–2003)
- June Carter Cash (1929–2003)
- Rosanne Cash (born 1955)
- Tommy Cash (1940–2024)
- Troy Cassar-Daley
- Jason Cassidy
- CB30
- Bill Chambers
- Kasey Chambers (born 1976)
- Chance
- Jeff Chance (1954–2008)
- Chapel Hart
- Beth Nielsen Chapman (born 1958)
- Cee Cee Chapman (born 1958)
- Donovan Chapman (born 1975)
- Marshall Chapman (born 1949)
- Steven Curtis Chapman (born 1962)
- Ray Charles (1930–2004)
- Diane Chase
- Will Chase (born 1970)
- Chasin' Crazy
- Kristin Chenoweth (born 1968)
- Kenny Chesney (born 1968)
- Mark Chesnutt (born 1963)
- The Chicks
- Tyler Childers
- Andy Childs (born 1962)
- Henry Cho (born 1962)
- Chris Buck Band
- The Chuck Wagon Gang
- Cindy Church
- Claudia Church (born 1962)
- Eric Church (born 1977)
- The Civil Wars
- Brandy Clark (born 1977)
- Callista Clark (born 2003)
- The Clark Family Experience
- Gene Clark (1944–1991)
- Guy Clark (1941–2016)
- Jameson Clark
- Roy Clark (1933–2018)
- Terri Clark (born 1968)
- Kelly Clarkson (born 1982)
- Philip Claypool
- Jack Clement
- Vassar Clements
- Patsy Cline (1932–1963)
- Jerry Clower (1926–1998)
- Brent Cobb
- Anita Cochran (born 1967)
- Eddie Cochran (1938–1960)
- Hank Cochran (1935–2010)
- Stephen Cochran (born 1979)
- Tammy Cochran (born 1972)
- David Allan Coe (1939–2026)
- Kellie Coffey (born 1971)
- Cold Creek County
- Coldwater Jane
- Beccy Cole
- Raquel Cole
- Mark Collie (born 1956)
- Shirley Collie (1931–2010)
- Brian Collins (born 1950)
- Jim Collins (born 1959)
- Judy Collins (born 1939)
- Tommy Collins (1930–2000)
- Travis Collins
- Jessi Colter (born 1943)
- Andrew Combs
- Luke Combs (born 1990)
- Amie Comeaux (1976–1997)
- The Common Linnets
- Perry Como (1912–2001)
- Ray Condo
- Confederate Railroad
- John Conlee (born 1946)
- Earl Thomas Conley (1941–2019)
- Graeme Connors
- Stompin' Tom Connors (1936–2013)
- Patricia Conroy (born 1964)
- Cooder Graw
- Ry Cooder
- Elizabeth Cook (born 1972)
- Jeff Cook (1949–2022)
- Kristy Lee Cook (born 1984)
- Ashley Cooke (born 1997)
- Mark Cooke
- Spade Cooley (1910–1969)
- Rita Coolidge (born 1945)
- Kolby Cooper (born 1999)
- Lenny Cooper
- Stoney Cooper (1918–1977)
- Wilma Lee Cooper (1921–2011)
- John Corbett (born 1961)
- Corbin/Hanner
- Easton Corbin (born 1982)
- Dianna Corcoran
- Larry Cordle (born 1948)
- Helen Cornelius (1941–2025)
- Joanna Cotten
- Brad Cotter (born 1970)
- Neal Coty (born 1964)
- The Country Gentlemen
- Court Yard Hounds
- Bucky Covington (born 1977)
- Cowboy Copas (1913–1963)
- Cowboy Crush
- Cowboy Junkies
- Cowboy Troy (born 1970)
- Don Cox (born 1964)
- The Cox Family
- Billy "Crash" Craddock (born 1939)
- Adam Craig
- Floyd Cramer (1933–1997)
- Crawford/West
- Roger Creager
- Creedence Clearwater Revival
- Melodie Crittenden (born 1969)
- Charley Crockett (born 1984)
- Crooked Still
- Rob Crosby (born 1954)
- Cross Canadian Ragweed
- Crossin Dixon
- Joel Crouse (born 1992)
- Sheryl Crow (born 1962)
- Rodney Crowell (born 1950)
- The Cruzeros
- Bobbie Cryner (born 1961)
- Jim Cuddy
- Chris Cummings
- Larry Cunningham (1938–2012)
- Dick Curless (1932–1995)
- Billy Currington (born 1973)
- Billy Ray Cyrus (born 1961)
- Miley Cyrus (born 1992)

== D ==
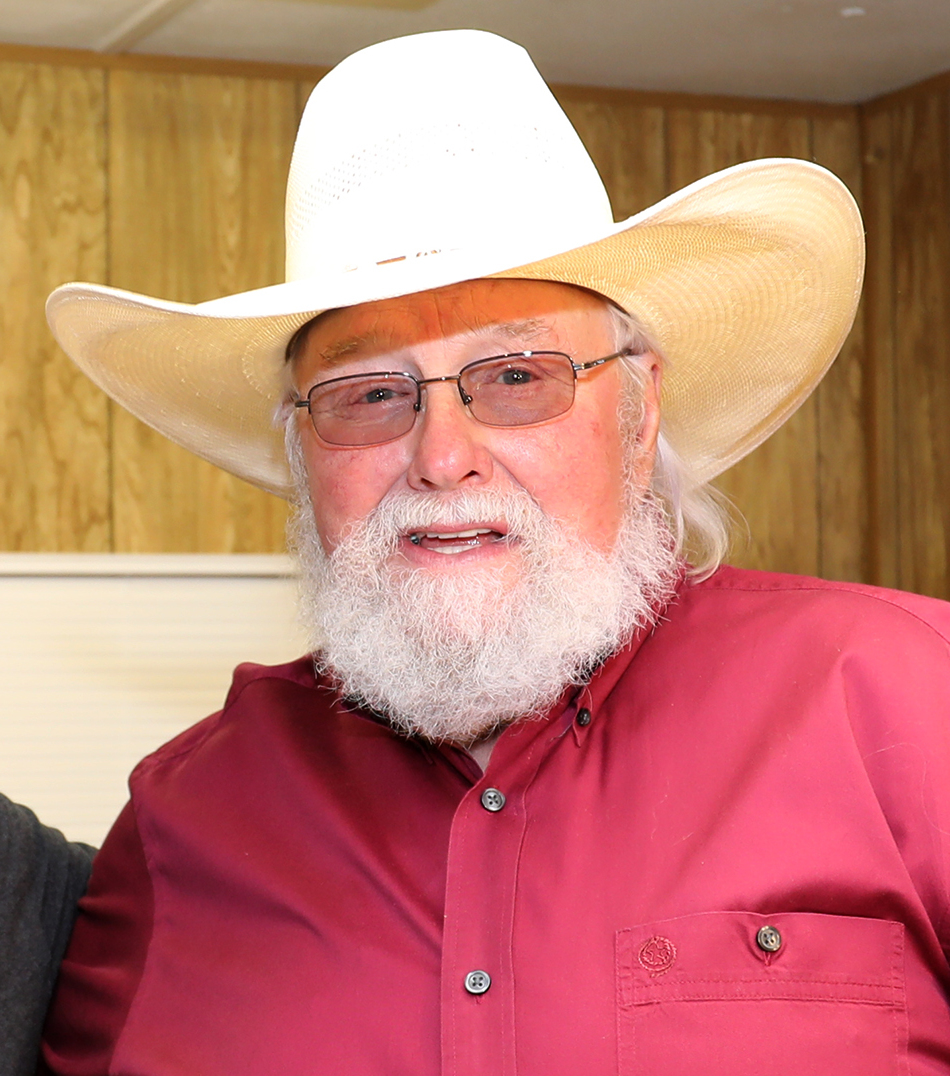
Charlie Daniels

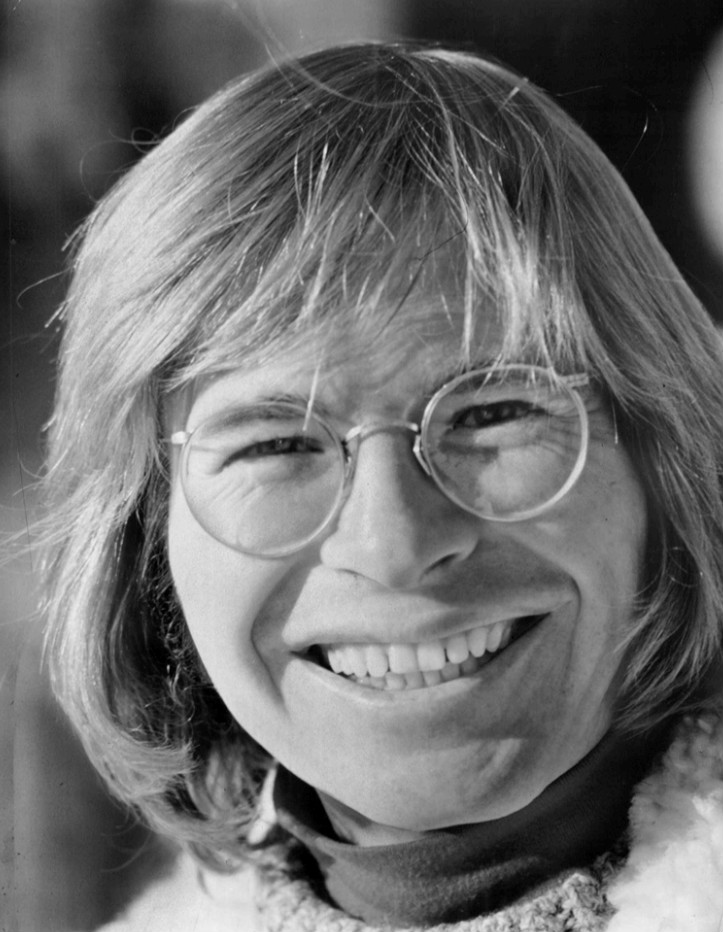
John Denver

- Dailey & Vincent
- Vernon Dalhart (1883–1948)
- Amy Dalley
- Lacy J. Dalton (born 1946)
- Dan + Shay
- Dale Daniel
- The Darlins
- Davis Daniel (born 1961)
- Charlie Daniels (1936–2020)
- Clint Daniels (born 1974)
- Leah Daniels (born 1987)
- Kikki Danielsson (born 1952)
- Bobby Darin (1936–1973)
- Helen Darling (born 1965)
- Sarah Darling (born 1982)
- Johnny Darrell (1940–1997)
- Dasha (born 2000)
- Dave & Sugar
- Clay Davidson (born 1971)
- Dan Davidson
- Elise Davis
- Gail Davies (born 1948)
- Jimmie Davis (1899–2000)
- Jon Christopher Davis
- Jordan Davis (born 1988)
- Linda Davis (born 1962)
- Mac Davis (1942–2020)
- Paul Davis (1948–2008)
- Skeeter Davis (1931–2004)
- Stu Davis (1921–2007)
- Davisson Brothers Band
- Devin Dawson (born 1989)
- Dax (born 1994)
- Jennifer Day (born 1979)
- Jesse Dayton
- Star De Azlan (born 1986)
- Billy Dean (born 1962)
- Eddie Dean (1907–1999)
- Jackson Dean (born 2000)
- Jimmy Dean (1928–2010)
- Roxie Dean (born 1974)
- Jessie James Decker (born 1988)
- Cole Deggs & The Lonesome
- Del McCoury Band
- Diana DeGarmo (born 1987)
- Penny DeHaven (1948–2014)
- Ilse DeLange (born 1977)
- The Delmore Brothers
- Martin Delray (born 1949)
- Delta Rae
- Iris DeMent (born 1961)
- Kevin Denney (born 1976)
- Travis Denning (born 1992)
- Wesley Dennis (born 1963)
- John Denver (1943–1997)
- The Departed
- The Derailers
- Daisy Dern (born c. 1967)
- The Desert Rose Band
- The Devil Makes Three
- Willy DeVille
- Lew DeWitt (1938–1990)
- Al Dexter (1905–1984)
- Neil Diamond (born 1941)
- Diamond Rio
- Jonny Diaz
- Little Jimmy Dickens (1920–2015)
- Russell Dickerson (born 1987)
- Tyler Dickerson (born 1993)
- Joe Diffie (1958–2020)
- Dean Dillon (born 1955)
- Diplo (born 1978)
- The Dirt Drifters
- Dixiana
- Doc Walker
- Deryl Dodd (born 1964)
- Cale Dodds
- Casey Donahew
- Amber Dotson
- Jerry Douglas
- Ronnie Dove
- Big Al Downing (1940–2005)
- Dusty Drake (born 1964)
- Drew Davis Band
- Jaida Dreyer
- Roy Drusky (1930–2004)
- George Ducas (born 1966)
- Cameron Duddy (born 1985)
- Dave Dudley (1928–2003)
- Due West
- Mary Duff
- John Duffey
- Johnny Duncan (1938–2006)
- Whitney Duncan (born 1986)
- Clare Dunn
- Holly Dunn (1957–2016)
- Ronnie Dunn (born 1953)
- Kathy Durkin
- Slim Dusty (1927–2003)
- Doyle Dykes
- Bob Dylan (born 1941)

== E ==
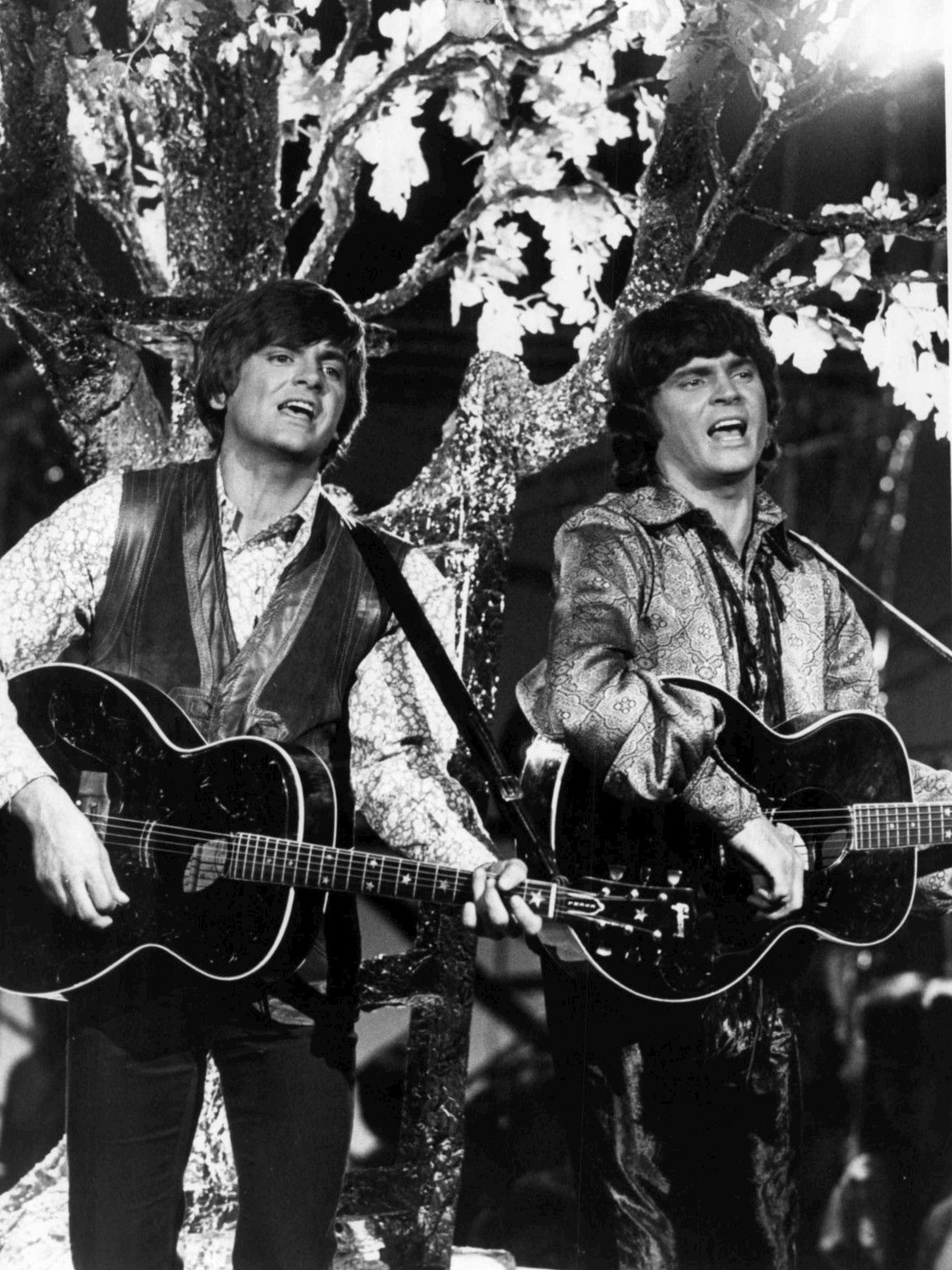
The Everly Brothers

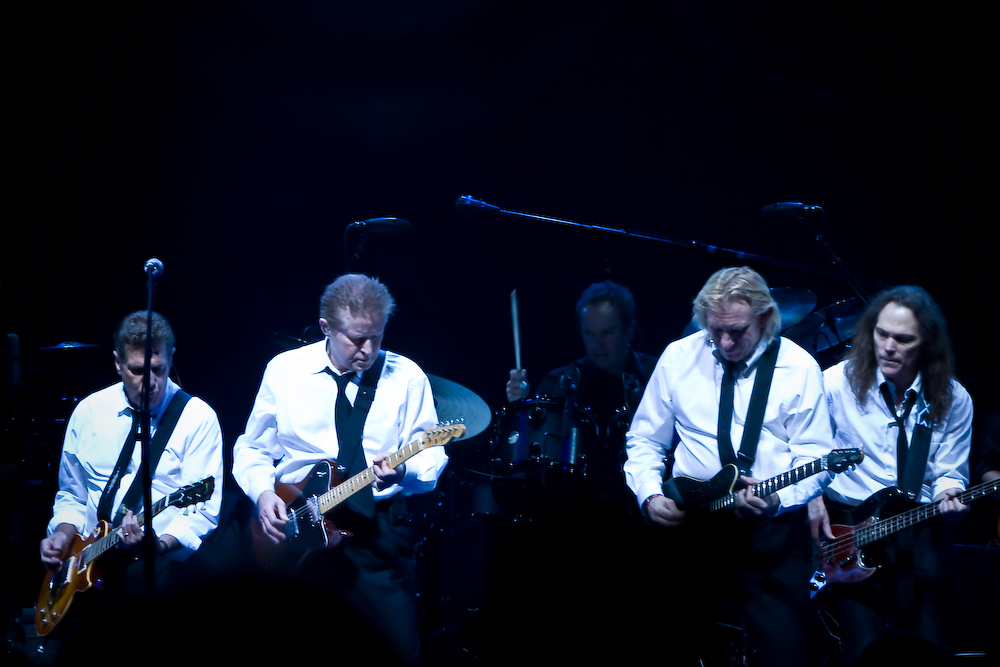
The Eagles

- Jason Eady
- Eagles
- Jade Eagleson
- Justin Townes Earle (1982–2020)
- Stacey Earle (born 1960)
- Steve Earle (born 1955)
- Mundo Earwood (1952–2014)
- Sheena Easton (born 1959)
- Clint Eastwood (born 1930)
- Duane Eddy (1938-2024)
- Brooke Eden
- Edens Edge
- Bobby Edwards (1926–2012)
- Don Edwards (1939–2022)
- Jonathan Edwards
- Kathleen Edwards
- Meredith Edwards (born 1984)
- Stoney Edwards (1929–1997)
- Katrina Elam (born 1983)
- Brett Eldredge (born 1986)
- Eleven Hundred Springs
- Eli Young Band
- Carrie Elkin
- Lindsay Ell (born 1989)
- Alecia Elliott (born 1982)
- Ramblin' Jack Elliott (born 1931)
- Darryl & Don Ellis
- Robert Ellis
- Joe Ely (born 1947)
- Scotty Emerick (born 1973)
- Emerson Drive
- Emilio (1962–2016)
- EmiSunshine
- Tommy Emmanuel
- Ty England (born 1963)
- Bill Engvall (born 1957)
- Ennis Sisters
- Seth Ennis (born 1992)
- Mark Erelli
- Ernest (born 1992)
- Charles Esten (born 1965)
- Melissa Etheridge (born 1961)
- Eric Ethridge
- Evangeline
- Bill Evans
- Dale Evans (1912–2001)
- Morgan Evans (born 1985)
- Sara Evans (born 1971)
- Jace Everett (born 1972)
- Leon Everette (born 1948)
- The Everly Brothers
- Skip Ewing (born 1964)
- Exile

== F ==
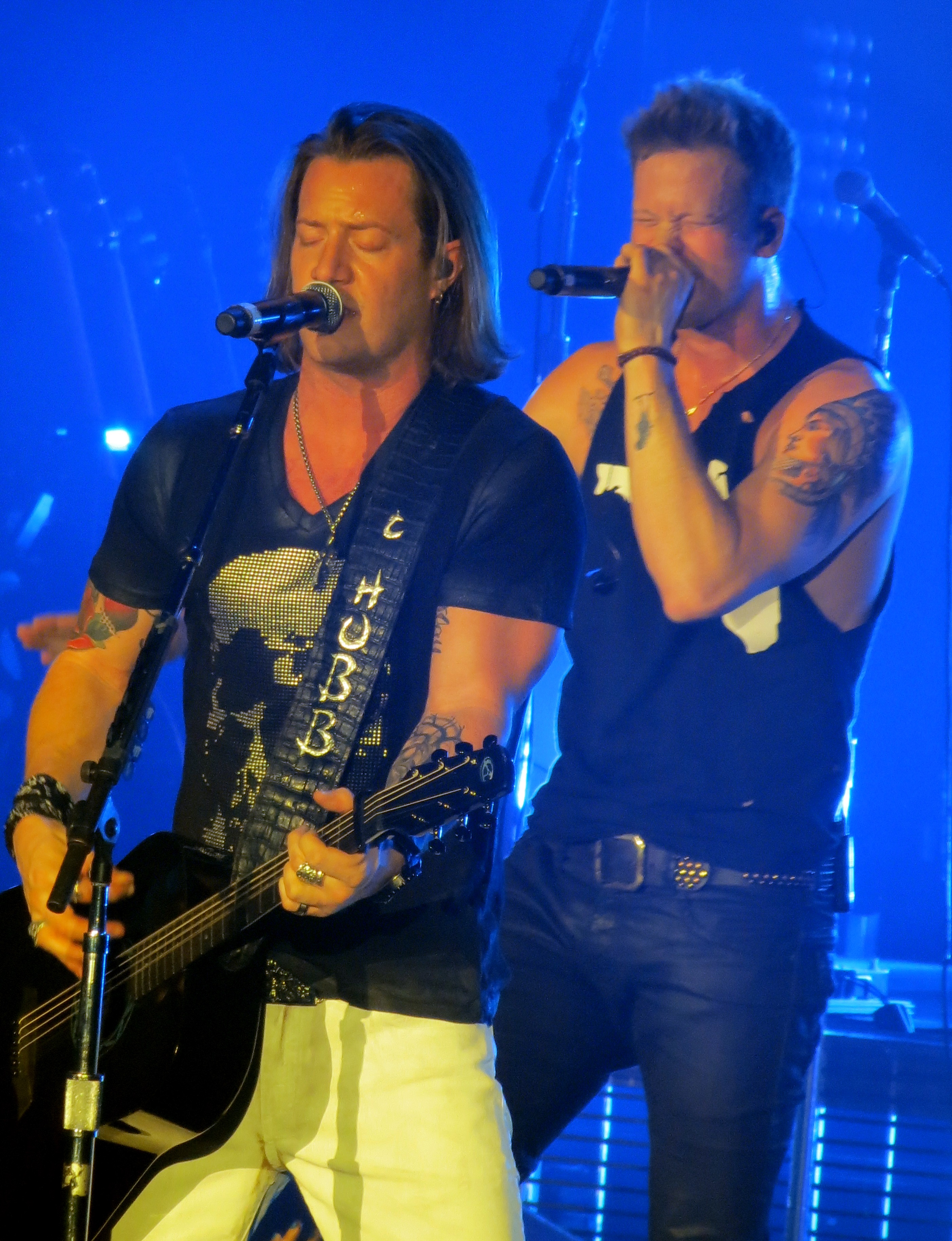
Florida Georgia Line

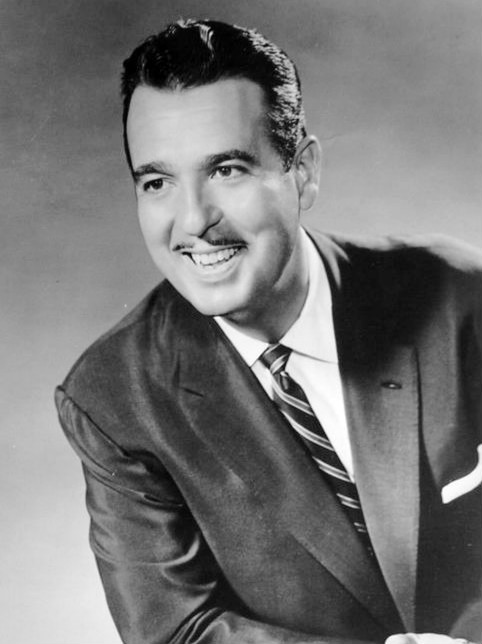
Tennessee Ernie Ford

- Barbara Fairchild (born 1950)
- Karen Fairchild (born 1969)
- Shelly Fairchild (born 1977)
- Carter Faith (born 2000)
- McKenna Faith
- Rose Falcon (born 1984)
- David Fanning
- Donna Fargo (born 1945)
- The Farm
- Farmer's Daughter
- Tyler Farr (born 1984)
- Jay Farrar (born 1966)
- Jessie Farrell
- Fast Ryde
- Jimmy Lee Fautheree
- Charlie Feathers (1932–1998)
- Joey Feek (1975–2016)
- Rory Feek (born 1965)
- Joel Feeney
- Terry Fell (1921–2007)
- Dick Feller
- Narvel Felts (born 1938)
- Freddy Fender (1937–2006)
- Paula Fernandes
- First Aid Kit
- Maury Finney
- Shea Fisher
- Flatland Cavalry
- The Flatlanders
- Lester Flatt (1914–1979)
- Flatt & Scruggs
- Rosie Flores (born 1950)
- Florida Georgia Line
- Flying Burrito Brothers
- Flynnville Train
- John Fogerty (born 1945)
- Foggy Mountain Boys
- Blaze Foley
- Red Foley (1910–1968)
- Folk Soul Revival
- Colt Ford
- Tennessee Ernie Ford (1919–1991)
- Steve Forde
- The Forester Sisters
- Jimmy Fortune (born 1955)
- Foster & Lloyd
- Frank Foster
- Radney Foster (born 1959)
- Jeffrey Foucault
- Kevin Fowler
- George Fox
- Steve Fox
- Fleet Foxes
- Jeff Foxworthy (born 1958)
- Cleve Francis (born 1945)
- Connie Francis (born 1937)
- Randall Franks
- Dallas Frazier (1939–2022)
- Frazier River
- Dori Freeman
- Glenn Frey (1948–2016)
- Janie Fricke (born 1947)
- Kinky Friedman (born 1944)
- David Frizzell (born 1941)
- Lefty Frizzell (1928–1975)
- Robbie Fulks (born 1963)
- Tony Furtado

== G ==
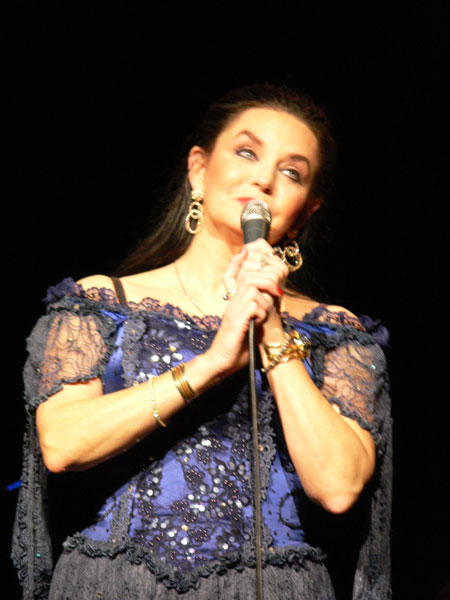
Crystal Gayle

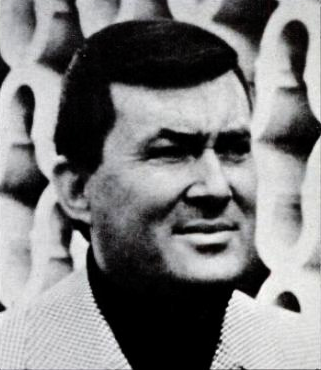
Don Gibson

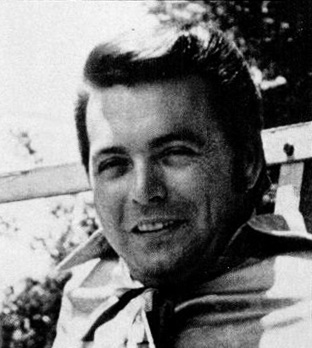
Mickey Gilley

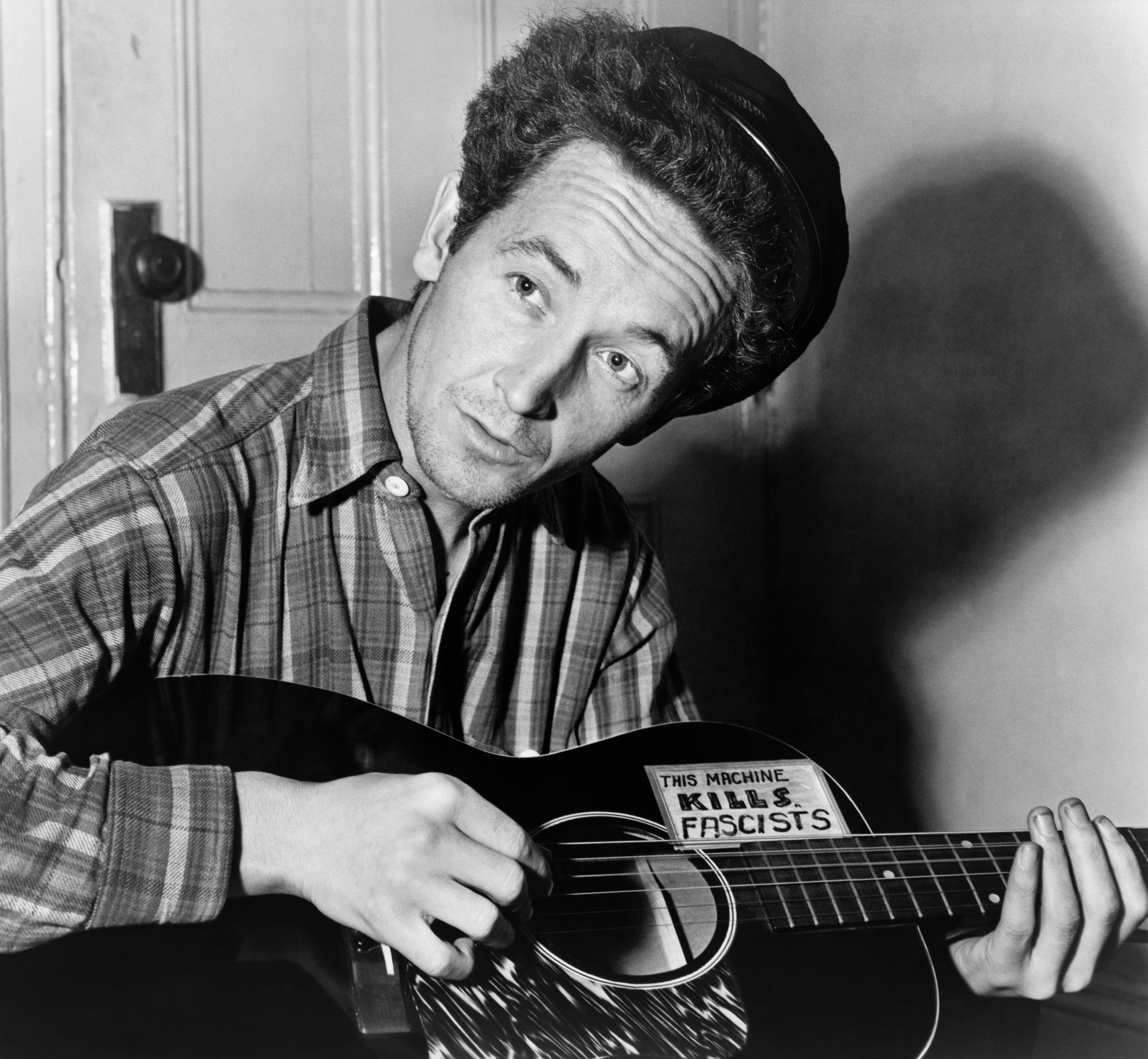
Woody Guthrie

- Chris Gaffney
- Lennie Gallant
- Nicolle Galyon (born 1984)
- Hank Garland (1930–2004)
- Bradley Gaskin
- David Gates (born 1940)
- Larry Gatlin (born 1948)
- Keith Gattis (born 1971)
- Jimmy Gaudreau
- Mary Gauthier
- Crystal Gayle (born 1951)
- Gear Daddies
- Ashley Gearing (born 1991)
- The Geezinslaw Brothers
- Mack Geiger
- Bobbie Gentry (born 1942)
- Rob Georg (born 1975)
- Giant Sand
- Terri Gibbs (born 1954)
- Andy Gibson (born 1981)
- Don Gibson (1928–2003)
- Gibson/Miller Band
- Rhiannon Giddens (born 1977)
- Kathie Lee Gifford
- Brantley Gilbert (born 1985)
- Vince Gill (born 1957)
- Mickey Gilley (1936–2022)
- Billy Gilman (born 1988)
- Jimmie Dale Gilmore (born 1945)
- Johnny Gimble
- Girls Next Door
- Jim Glaser (1937–2019)
- Tompall Glaser (1933–2013)
- Gloriana
- Teea Goans
- Danny Gokey (born 1980)
- William Lee Golden (born 1939)
- The Goldens
- Bobby Goldsboro (born 1941)
- Gone West
- Goose Creek Symphony
- Robert Gordon
- Vern Gosdin (1934–2009)
- The Gourds
- Josh Gracin (born 1980)
- Tammy Graham (born 1968)
- Billy Grammer (1925–2011)
- Gil Grand
- Steve Grand
- Amy Grant (born 1960)
- The Grascals
- Claude Gray (born 1932)
- The Great Divide
- Great Plains
- Great Speckled Bird
- Green River Ordinance
- Pat Green (born 1972)
- Riley Green (born 1988)
- William Clark Green
- Jack Greene (1930–2013)
- Lee Greenwood (born 1942)
- Ricky Lynn Gregg (born 1961)
- Adam Gregory (born 1985)
- Clinton Gregory (born 1966)
- Terry Gregory (born 1956)
- Ray Griff (1940–2016)
- Patty Griffin
- Andy Griffith (1926–2012)
- Nanci Griffith (1953–2021)
- Morgan Griffiths
- Andy Griggs (born 1973)
- Luke Grimes (born 1984)
- The GrooveGrass Boyz
- Bonnie Guitar (1923–2019)
- Wylie Gustafson
- Woody Guthrie (1912–1967)
- Bruce Guthro
- Mickey Guyton (born 1983)

== H ==
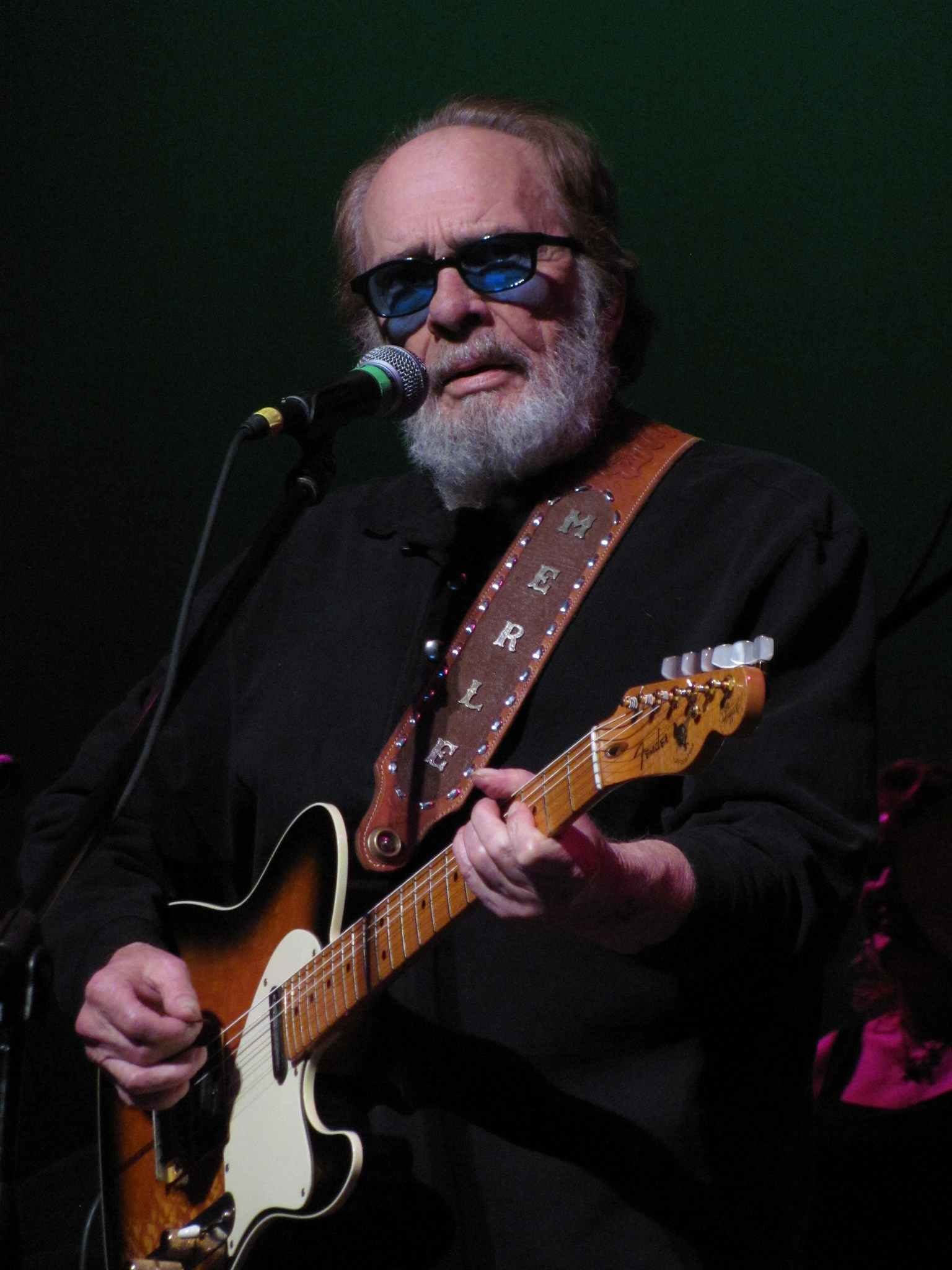
Merle Haggard

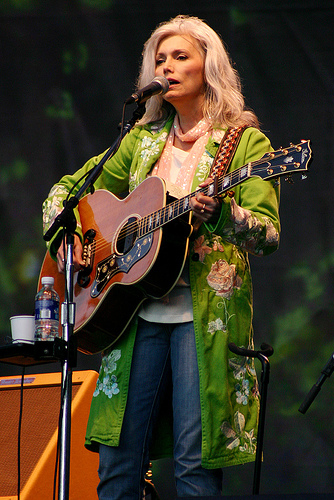
Emmylou Harris

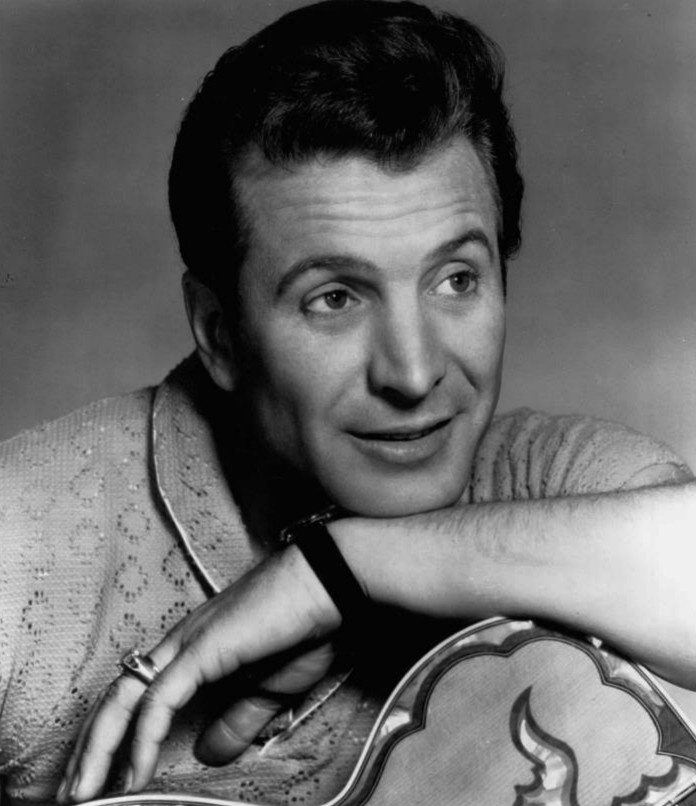
Ferlin Husky

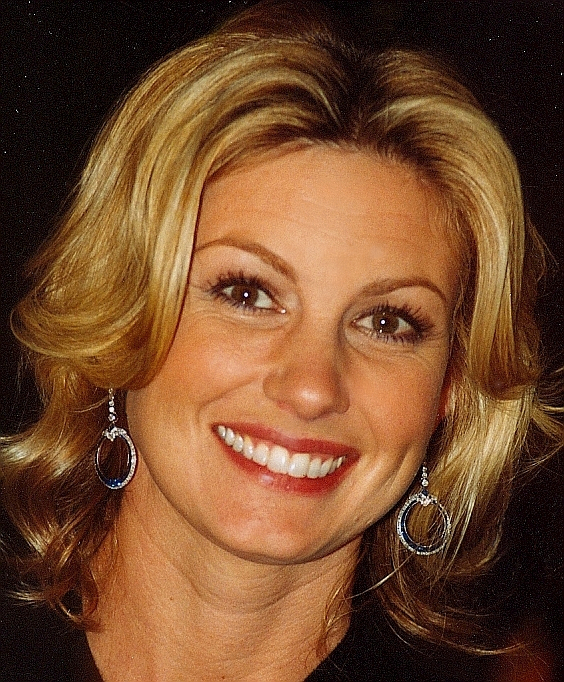
Faith Hill

- The Hackensaw Boys
- Merle Haggard (1937–2016)
- Noel Haggard (born 1963)
- Lucy Hale (born 1989)
- Haley & Michaels
- Halfway to Hazard
- Tom T. Hall (1936–2021)
- Nate Haller
- Tom Hambridge
- George Hamilton IV (1937–2014)
- Caylee Hammack (born 1994)
- Billy Hancock
- Butch Hancock (born 1948)
- Wayne Hancock
- Hank Flamingo
- Greg Hanna
- Jeff Hanna (born 1947)
- Hanna-McEuen
- Frank Hannon
- Jennifer Hanson (born 1973)
- Arlene Harden (born 1945)
- Gus Hardin (1945–1996)
- Hardy (born 1990)
- Keith Harling (born 1963)
- Trent Harmon (born 1990)
- Joni Harms (born 1959)
- Jessica Harp (born 1982)
- Emmylou Harris (born 1947)
- Kylie Rae Harris (1989–2019)
- Freddie Hart (1926–2018)
- Kelsey Hart (born 1991)
- Tara Lyn Hart (born 1978)
- J. Michael Harter (born 1979)
- The Harters
- John Hartford (1937–2001)
- Adam Harvey
- Kerry Harvick (born 1974)
- Bobby Hatfield (1955-2003)
- Lindsey Haun
- Chris Hawkey
- Hawkshaw Hawkins (1921–1963)
- Amber Hayes
- Hunter Hayes (born 1991)
- Wade Hayes (born 1969)
- Walker Hayes (born 1979)
- Susan Haynes
- Aubrey Haynie
- Lee Hazlewood (1929–2007)
- Heartland
- Eric Heatherly (born 1970)
- Roy Heinrich (born 1953)
- Hellbound Glory
- Amy Helm
- Bobby Helms (1933–1997)
- Natalie Hemby (born 1977)
- Mike Henderson
- Don Henley (born 1947)
- The Henningsens
- Ty Herndon (born 1962)
- Caroline Herring
- Lisa Hewitt
- Hey Romeo
- John Hiatt (born 1952)
- Lilly Hiatt
- Dan Hicks (1941–2016)
- Tim Hicks (born 1979)
- Bertie Higgins
- High Valley
- Highway 101
- The Highwaymen
- The Highwomen
- Arty Hill
- Faith Hill (born 1967)
- Goldie Hill (1933–2005)
- Kim Hill
- Chris Hillman (born 1944)
- Tish Hinojosa (born 1955)
- Unknown Hinson (born 1954)
- Becky Hobbs (born 1950)
- JT Hodges (born 1977)
- Billy Hoffman
- Nick Hoffman (born 1979)
- Noeline Hofmann
- Sean Hogan
- Will Hoge
- Roscoe Holcomb
- Greg Holland (born 1967)
- Jolie Holland
- Buddy Holly (1936–1959)
- Doyle Holly (1936–2007)
- Monty Holmes
- Scott Holstein (born 1974)
- Steve Holy (born 1972)
- Home Free
- Homer & Jethro
- Hometown News
- honeyhoney
- The Honeycutters
- Honky Tonk Confidential
- Adam Hood
- Ray Hood
- Hootie & the Blowfish
- Mallary Hope (born 1987)
- John Driskell Hopkins (born 1971)
- James T. Horn (born 1966)
- Tristan Horncastle
- Damien Horne (born 1978)
- Nikki Hornsby
- Johnny Horton (1925–1960)
- Steven Wayne Horton
- Rita Hosking (born 1969)
- Hot Apple Pie
- Julianne Hough (born 1988)
- Kal Hourd (born 1975)
- James House (born 1955)
- Tom House
- Randy Houser (born 1975)
- David Houston (1935–1993)
- Houston County
- Jan Howard (1930–2020)
- Randy Howard (1950–2015)
- Randy Howard (1960–1999)
- Rebecca Lynn Howard (born 1979)
- Van Howard (1929–2012)
- Tyler Hubbard (born 1987)
- Ray Wylie Hubbard (born 1946)
- Donna Hughes
- Jedd Hughes (born 1982)
- Hugo
- Sierra Hull
- Levi Hummon
- Marcus Hummon (born 1955)
- Con Hunley (born 1945)
- Sam Hunt (born 1984)
- Jesse Hunter (born 1959)
- Tommy Hunter (born 1937)
- Hunter Brothers
- Ryan Hurd (born 1986)
- Jim Hurst
- Tim Hus
- Ferlin Husky (1925–2011)
- The Hutchens
- Al Hurricane (1936–2017)
- Al Hurricane Jr. (born 1959)
- Brian Hyland
- Ron Hynes (1950–2015)

== I ==
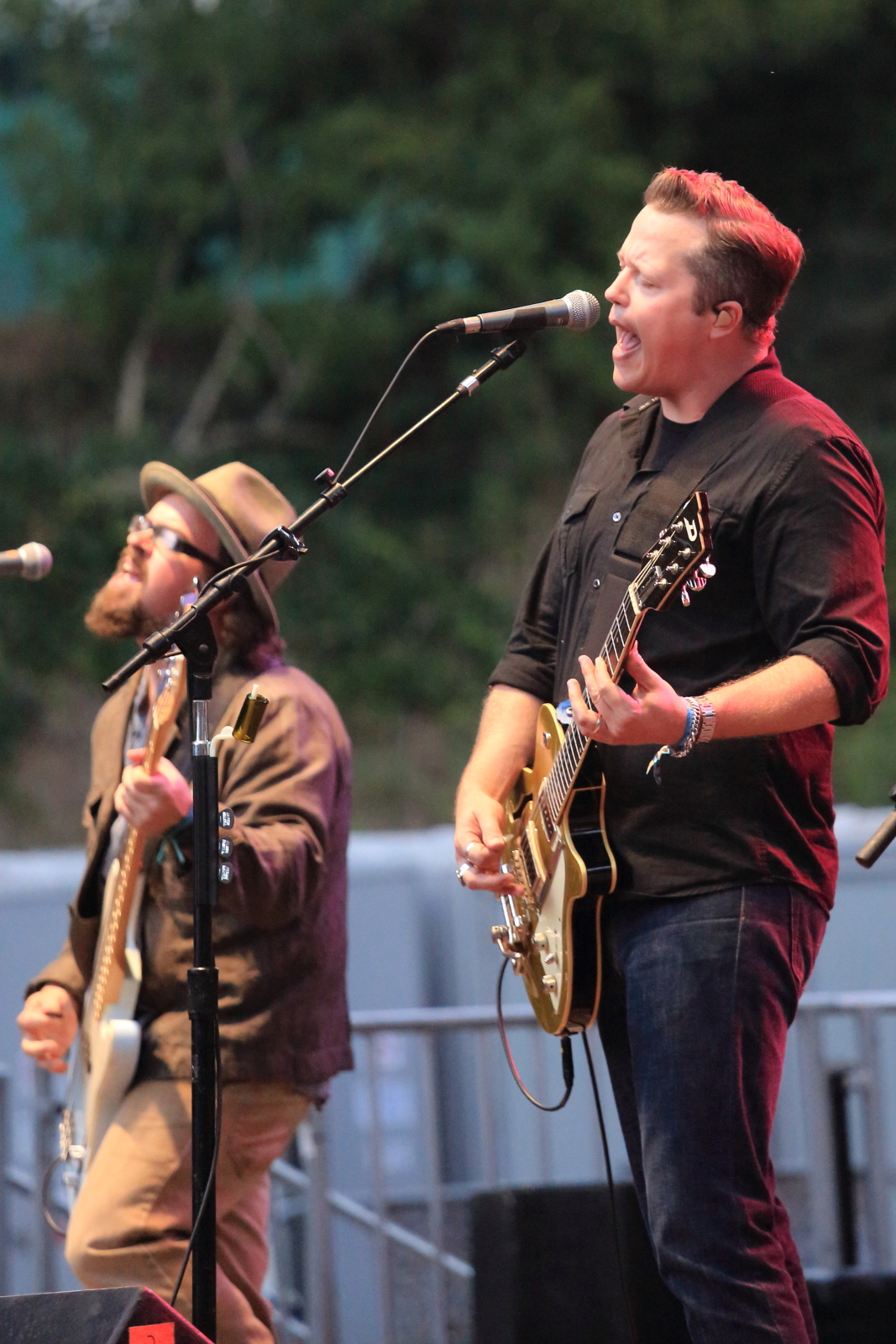
Jason Isbell (right)

- Ian & Sylvia
- Jimmy Ibbotson (born 1947)
- Rob Ickes
- Infamous Stringdusters
- Jack Ingram (born 1970)
- James Intveld
- Julienne Irwin (born 1993)
- The Isaacs
- Sonya Isaacs (born 1974)
- Kira Isabella (born 1993)
- Jason Isbell (born 1979)
- Burl Ives (1909–1995)

== J ==
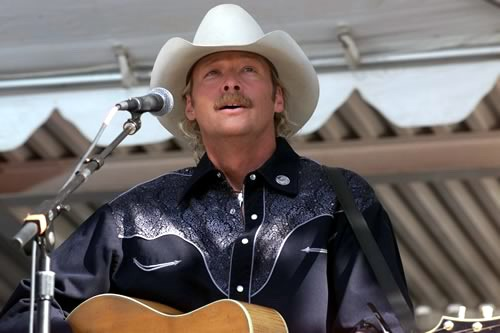
Alan Jackson

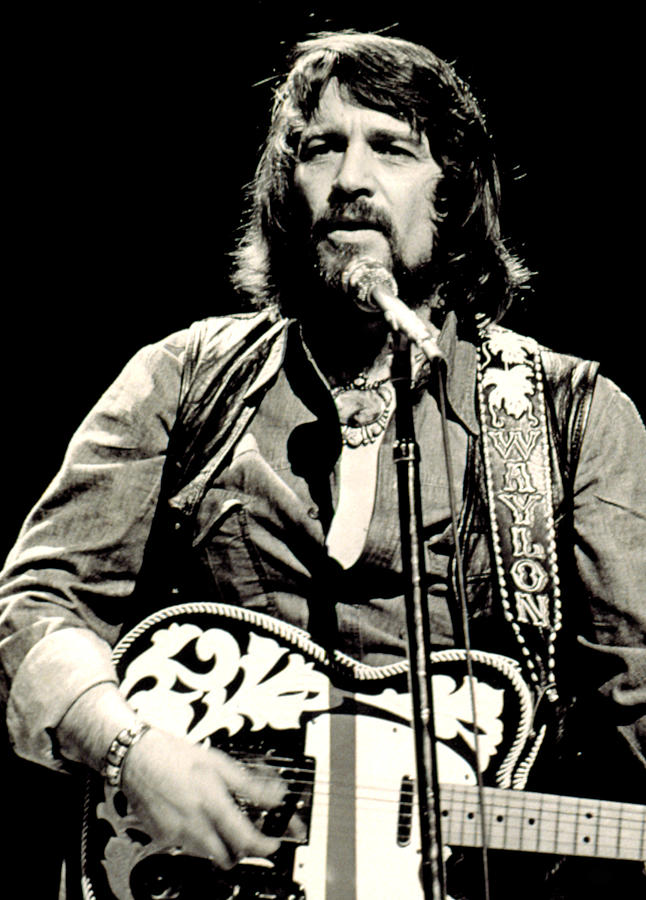
Waylon Jennings

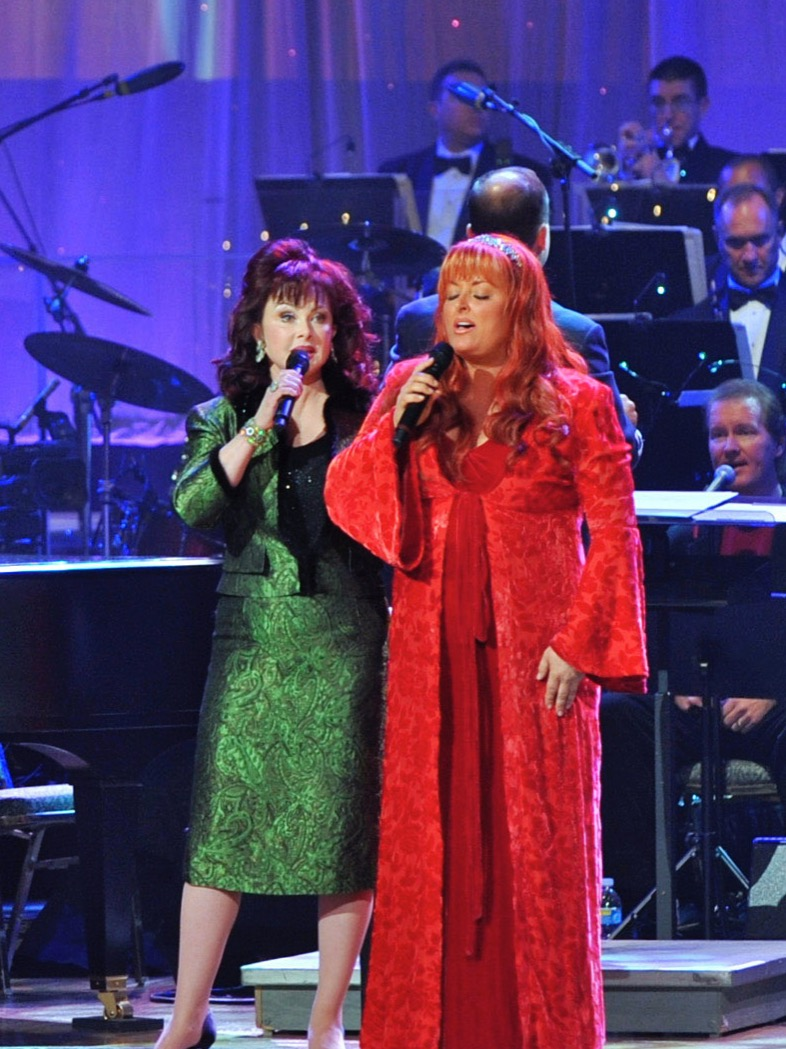
The Judds

- Alan Jackson (born 1958)
- Jonathan Jackson (born 1982)
- Stonewall Jackson (1932–2021)
- Wanda Jackson (born 1937)
- James and the Shame
- James Barker Band
- Brett James (1968–2025)
- Casey James (born 1982)
- David James
- Greylan James (born 1996)
- Harmony James
- Mickie James (born 1979)
- Sonny James (1928–2016)
- The JaneDear Girls
- Joanna Janét
- Chris Janson (born 1986)
- Jaron and the Long Road to Love (born 1974)
- Sarah Jarosz
- Jawga Boyz
- Jerry Jaye
- JB and the Moonshine Band
- Norma Jean (born 1938)
- Livy Jeanne
- Paul Jefferson (born 1961)
- Gina Jeffreys
- Herb Jeffreys (1913–2014)
- Jelly Roll (born 1984)
- The Jenkins
- The Rev. Andrew Jenkins (1895–1957)
- Brandon Jenkins (1969–2018)
- Matt Jenkins
- Shooter Jennings (born 1979)
- Waylon Jennings (1937–2002)
- Drake Jensen (born 1970)
- Jetty Road
- Jewel (born 1974)
- Buddy Jewell (born 1961)
- Eilen Jewell
- Cody Jinks
- Erika Jo (born 1986)
- Jo Hikk
- Joey + Rory
- Brad Johner
- The Johner Brothers
- Johnnie & Jack
- Sarah Johns (born 1979)
- Carolyn Dawn Johnson (born 1971)
- Cody Johnson (born 1987)
- Jamey Johnson (born 1975)
- Jill Johnson (born 1973)
- Michael Johnson (1944–2017)
- Jolie & The Wanted
- Jonas Brothers
- Anthony Armstrong Jones (1949–1996)
- Caroline Jones
- David Lynn Jones (born 1950)
- Diana Jones
- George Jones (1931–2013)
- Grandpa Jones (1913–1998)
- J. C. Jones (born 1973)
- Jason Jones
- Joshua Scott Jones (born 1980)
- Kacey Jones (1950-2016)
- Norah Jones (born 1979)
- Tom Jones (born 1940)
- Zona Jones
- Leslie Jordan (1955–2022)
- The Jordanaires
- John Jorgenson (born 1956)
- Josh Abbott Band
- Scott Joss
- Cledus T. Judd (born 1964)
- Naomi Judd (1946–2022)
- Wynonna Judd (born 1964)
- The Judds
- Valerie June (born 1982)
- Victoria Justice (born 1993)
- Jypsi

== K ==
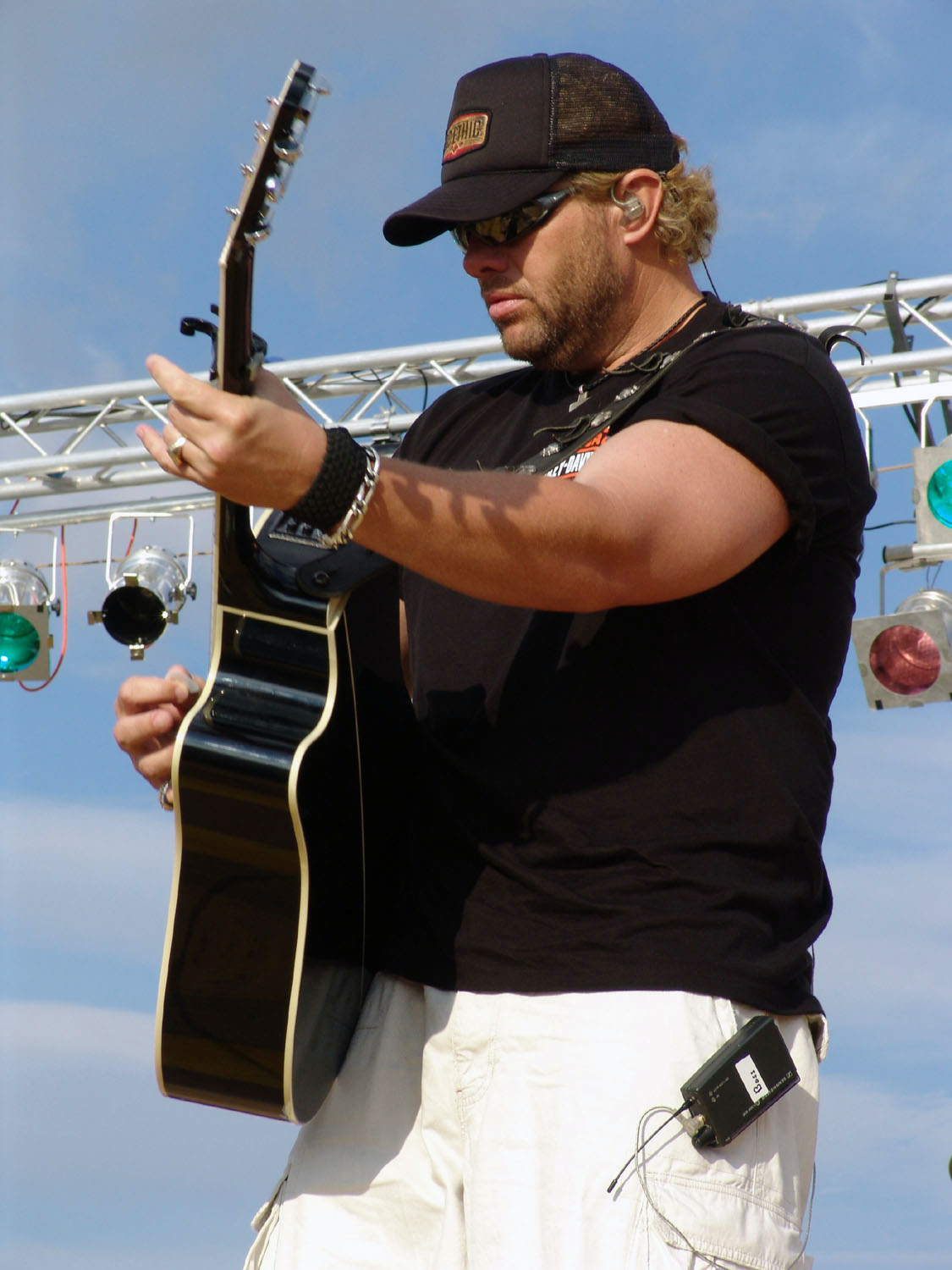
Toby Keith

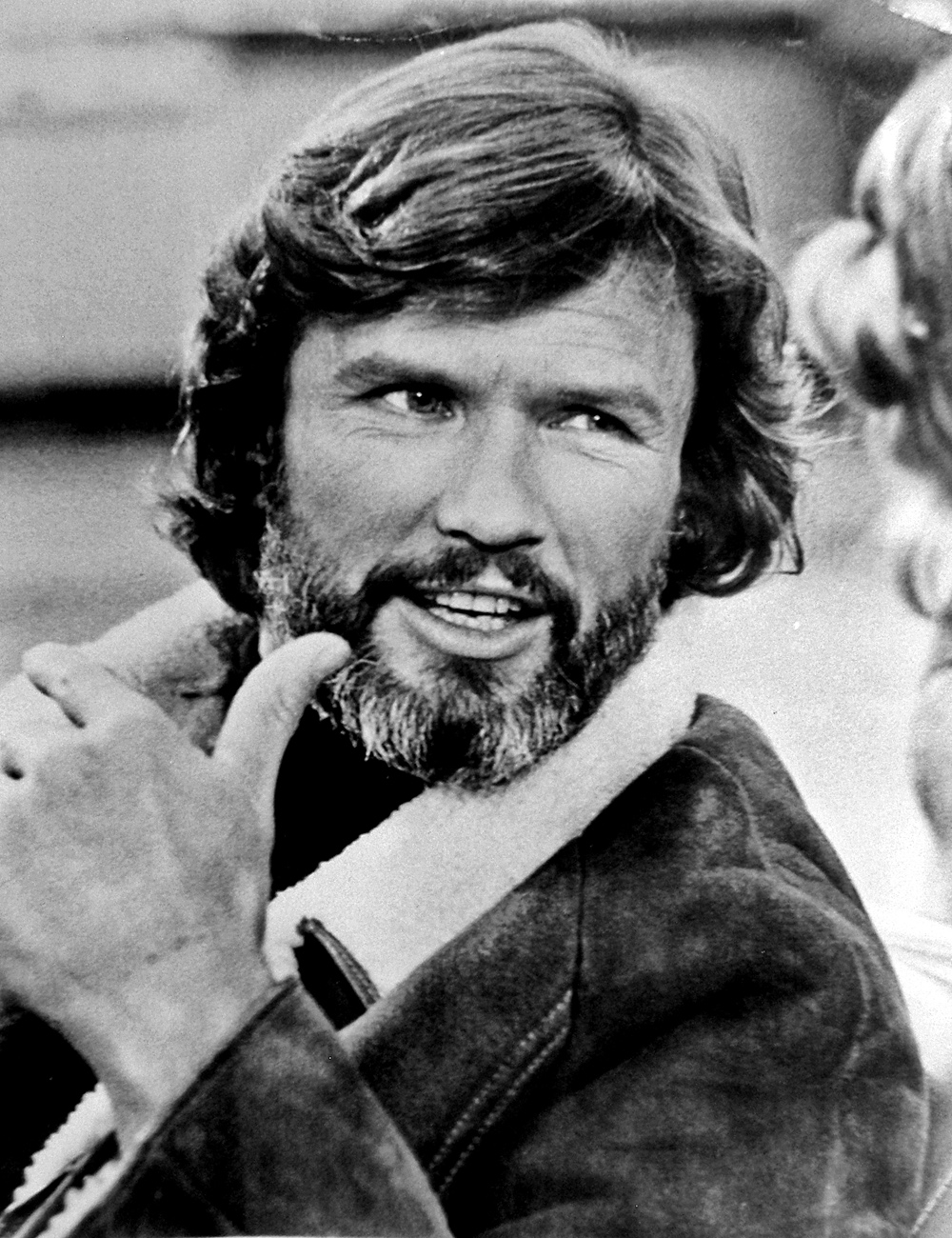
Kris Kristofferson

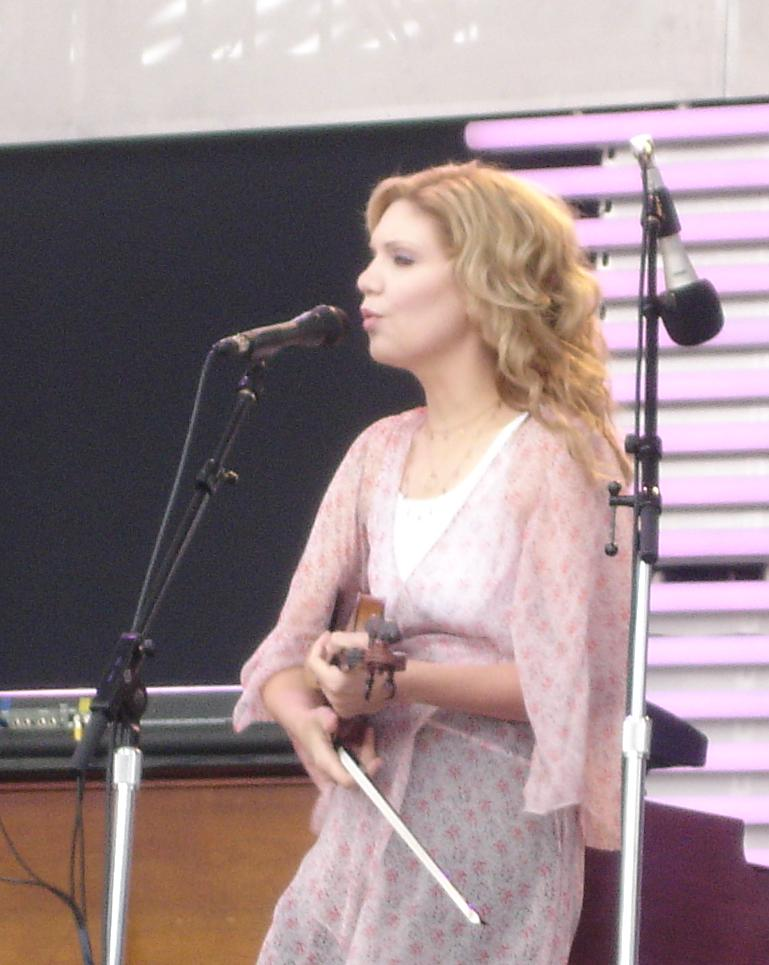
Alison Krauss

- Noah Kahan (born 1997)
- Ted Russell Kamp
- Christian Kane (born 1974)
- Kieran Kane (born 1949)
- Kate & Kacey
- Alexandra Kay (born 1991)
- Kortney Kayle
- Gay Kayler (born 1941)
- Keb' Mo' (born 1951)
- Greg Keelor
- Robert Earl Keen (born 1956)
- Krystal Keith (born 1985)
- Toby Keith (1961–2024)
- Joanie Keller
- Brian Kelley (born 1985)
- Charles Kelley (born 1981)
- Irene Kelley
- Josh Kelley (born 1980)
- Kristen Kelly
- Ruston Kelly (born 1988)
- The Kendalls
- Bap Kennedy
- Joan Kennedy
- Ray Kennedy (born 1954)
- Matt Kennon
- Corey Kent (born 1994)
- John David Kent
- The Kentucky Headhunters
- Lee Kernaghan (born 1964)
- Ray Kernaghan
- Tania Kernaghan (born 1968)
- David Kersh (born 1970)
- Doug Kershaw (born 1936)
- Sammy Kershaw (born 1958)
- Hal Ketchum (1953–2020)
- Kevin Costner & Modern West
- Kid Rock (born 1971)
- Jerry Kilgore (born 1964)
- Merle Kilgore (1934–2005)
- Will Kimbrough
- Royal Wade Kimes
- Claude King (1923–2013)
- Don King (born 1954)
- Elle King (born 1989)
- Jill King (born 1975)
- John King
- Matt King (born 1966)
- Pee Wee King (1914–2000)
- Zach John King (born 1997)
- Kings County Queens
- Kingston
- The Kinleys (born 1970)
- Bill Kirchen
- Brett Kissel (born 1990)
- Chad Klinger
- Chris Knight (born 1960)
- Jeff Knight
- The Knitters
- Mark Knopfler (born 1949)
- Roger Knox
- Randy Kohrs
- Steve Kolander (born 1961)
- Caroline Kole
- Jana Kramer (born 1983)
- Alison Krauss (born 1971)
- Viktor Krauss
- Kris Kristofferson (1936–2024)

== L ==
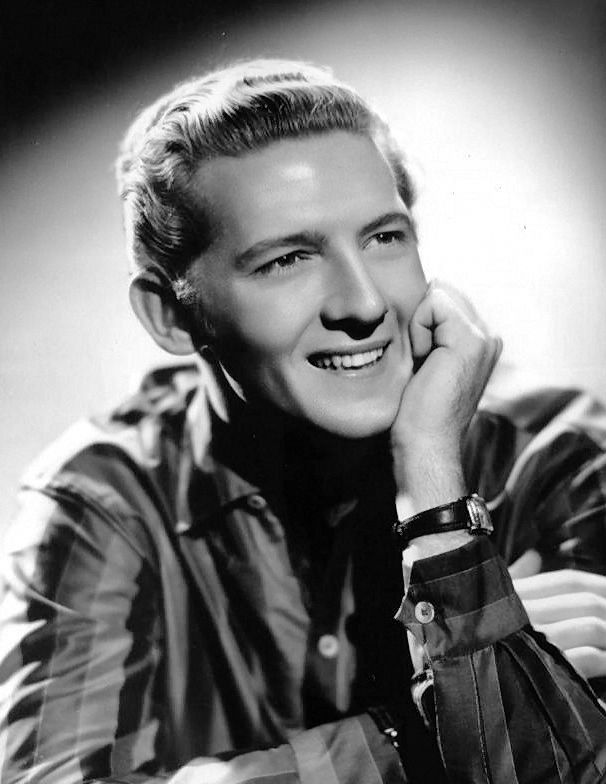
Jerry Lee Lewis

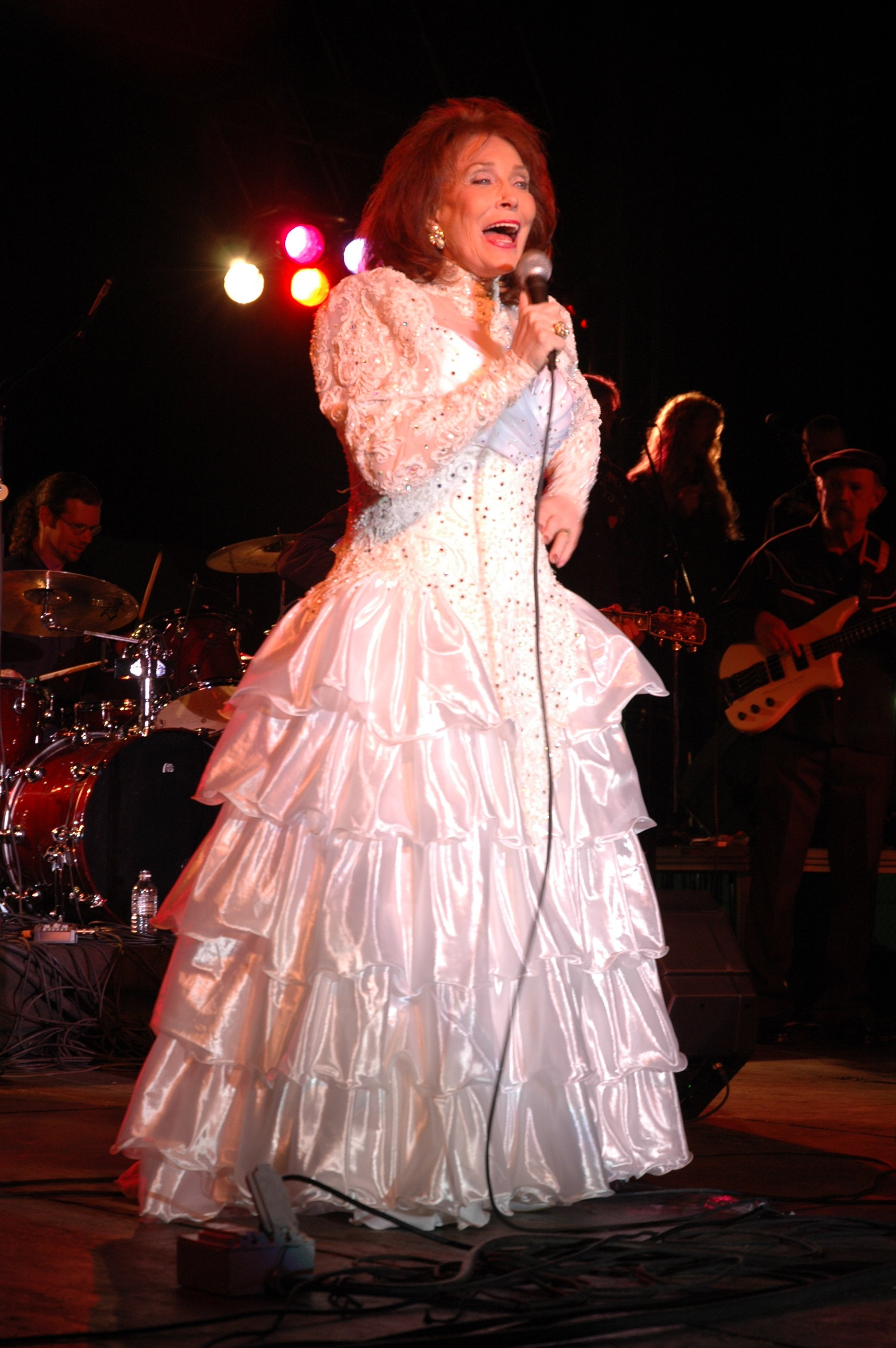
Loretta Lynn

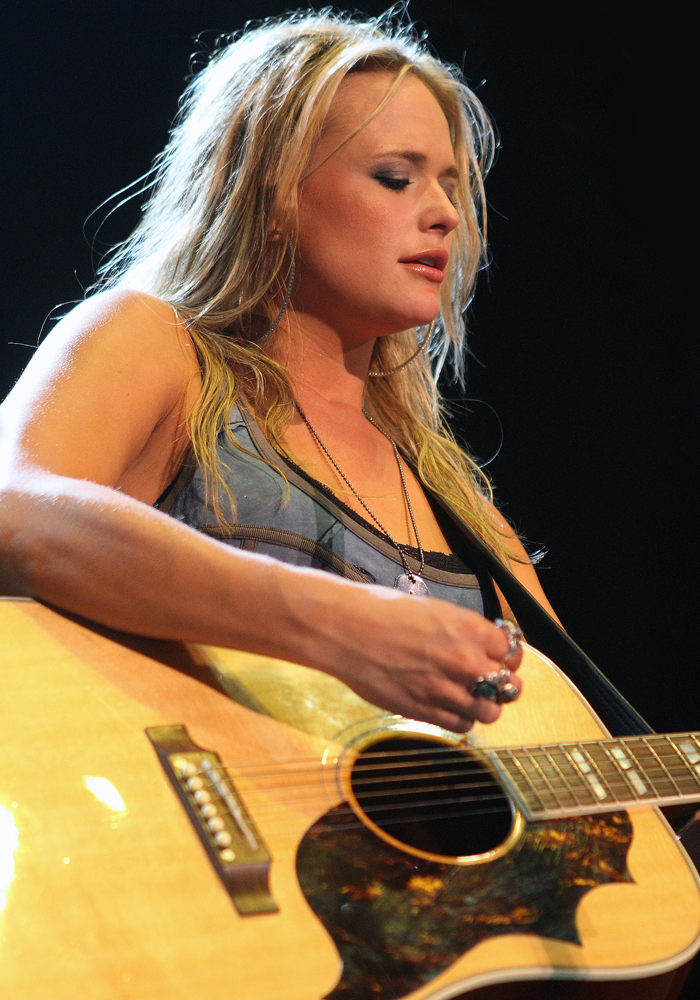
Miranda Lambert

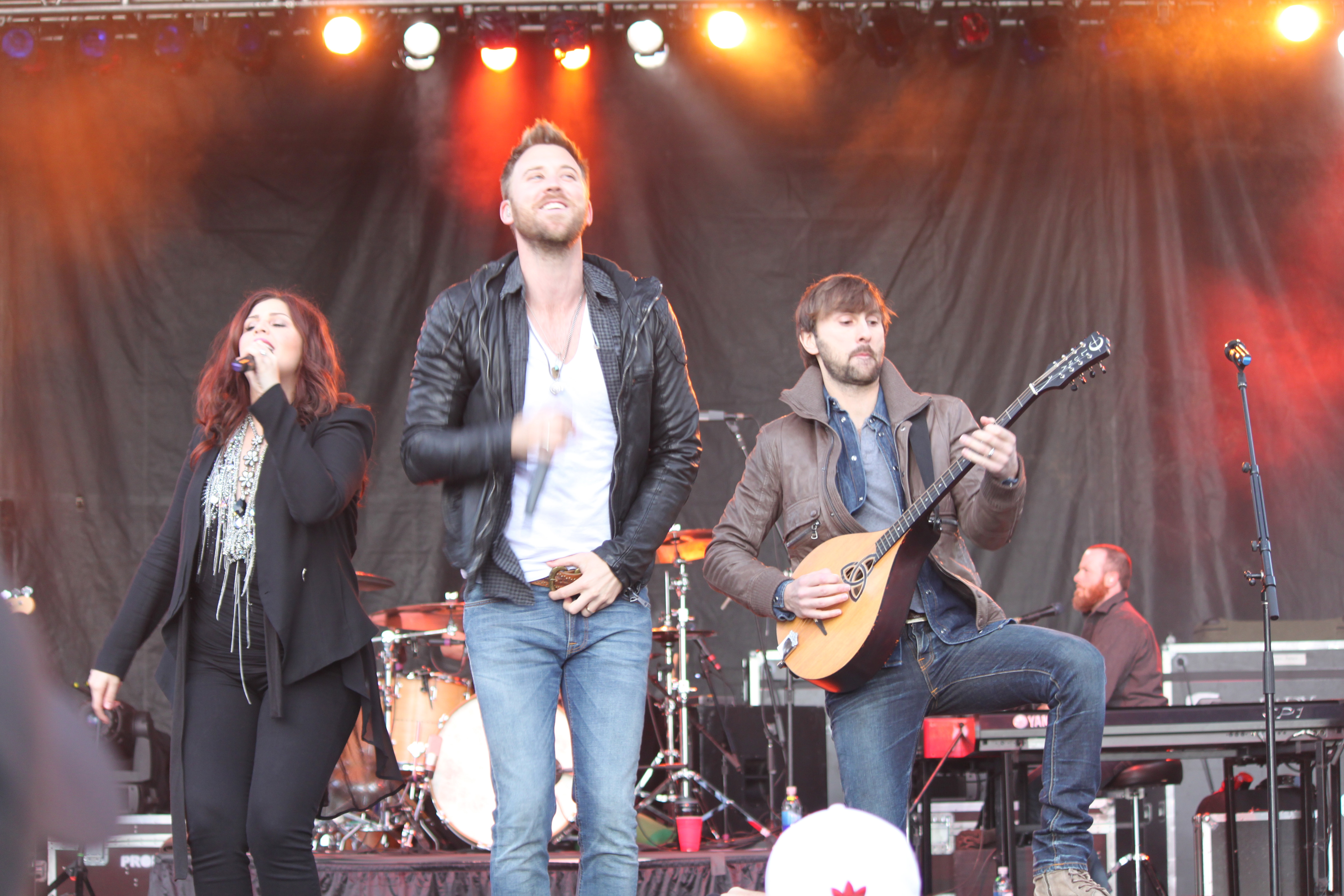
Lady A

- La Costa (born 1951)
- Bill LaBounty
- Lace
- The Lacs
- Ladies of the Canyon
- Lady A
- Pokey LaFarge
- Frankie Laine (1913–2007)
- Melanie Laine
- Ryan Laird
- Brandon Lake (born 1990)
- Holly Lamar
- Miranda Lambert (born 1983)
- Lanco
- John Landry
- Chris Lane (born 1984)
- Cristy Lane (born 1940)
- Matt Lang
- k.d. lang (born 1961)
- Ella Langley (born 1999)
- Jon Langston (born 1992)
- Larry the Cable Guy
- Blaine Larsen (born 1986)
- Nicolette Larson (1952–1997)
- Stoney LaRue (born 1977)
- Jim Lauderdale (born 1957)
- Lauren-Ashley
- Lavender Country
- JJ Lawhorn (born 1993)
- Amber Lawrence
- Tracy Lawrence (born 1968)
- Doyle Lawson
- Melissa Lawson (born 1976)
- Shannon Lawson (born 1973)
- Griffin Layne (born 1980)
- Bernie Leadon (born 1947)
- Leahy
- Chris LeDoux (1948–2005)
- Brenda Lee (born 1944)
- Jackie Lee (born 1991)
- Jesse Lee (born 1987)
- Johnny Lee (born 1946)
- Robin Lee (born 1963)
- Scooter Lee (born 1957)
- Woody Lee (born 1968)
- Stella Lefty (born 2002)
- Zella Lehr (born 1951)
- Danni Leigh (born 1970)
- Sonia Leigh (born 1978)
- Lennon & Maisy
- Levon
- Gary LeVox (born 1970)
- Aaron Lewis (born 1972)
- Bobby Lewis (born 1942)
- Jerry Lee Lewis (1935–2022)
- Linda Gail Lewis
- Gordon Lightfoot (1938–2023)
- Lil Nas X
- Christina Lindberg
- David Lindley
- Hillary Lindsey (born 1977)
- Elisa Lindström
- Aaron Lines (born 1977)
- Meghan Linsey (born 1985)
- Little Big Town
- Little Texas
- Peggy Little (born 1942)
- Lobo
- LoCash
- Hank Locklin (1918–2009)
- Josh Logan
- Dave Loggins (1947–2024)
- Kenny Loggins (born 1948)
- Loggins and Messina
- Lonestar
- Brice Long (born 1971)
- Lonzo and Oscar
- The Lost Trailers
- Myrna Lorrie (born 1940)
- John D. Loudermilk (1934–2016)
- The Louvin Brothers
- Ira Louvin (1924–1965)
- Charlie Louvin (1927–2011)
- Demi Lovato (born 1992)
- Love and Theft
- Lydia Loveless
- Patty Loveless (born 1957)
- Lyle Lovett (born 1957)
- Ruby Lovett
- Austin Lucas
- Lauren Lucas
- Lucy Angel
- Bob Luman (1937–1978)
- Corb Lund and the Hurtin' Albertans
- Jacob Lyda (born 1975)
- Rachele Lynae
- Dustin Lynch (born 1985)
- Richard Lynch
- Loretta Lynn (1932–2022)
- Rockie Lynne (born 1964)
- Shelby Lynne (born 1968)
- The Lynns
- Lynyrd Skynyrd

== M ==
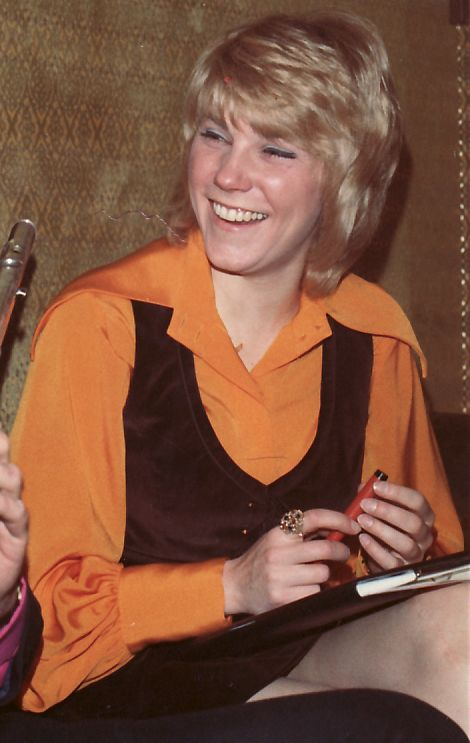
Anne Murray

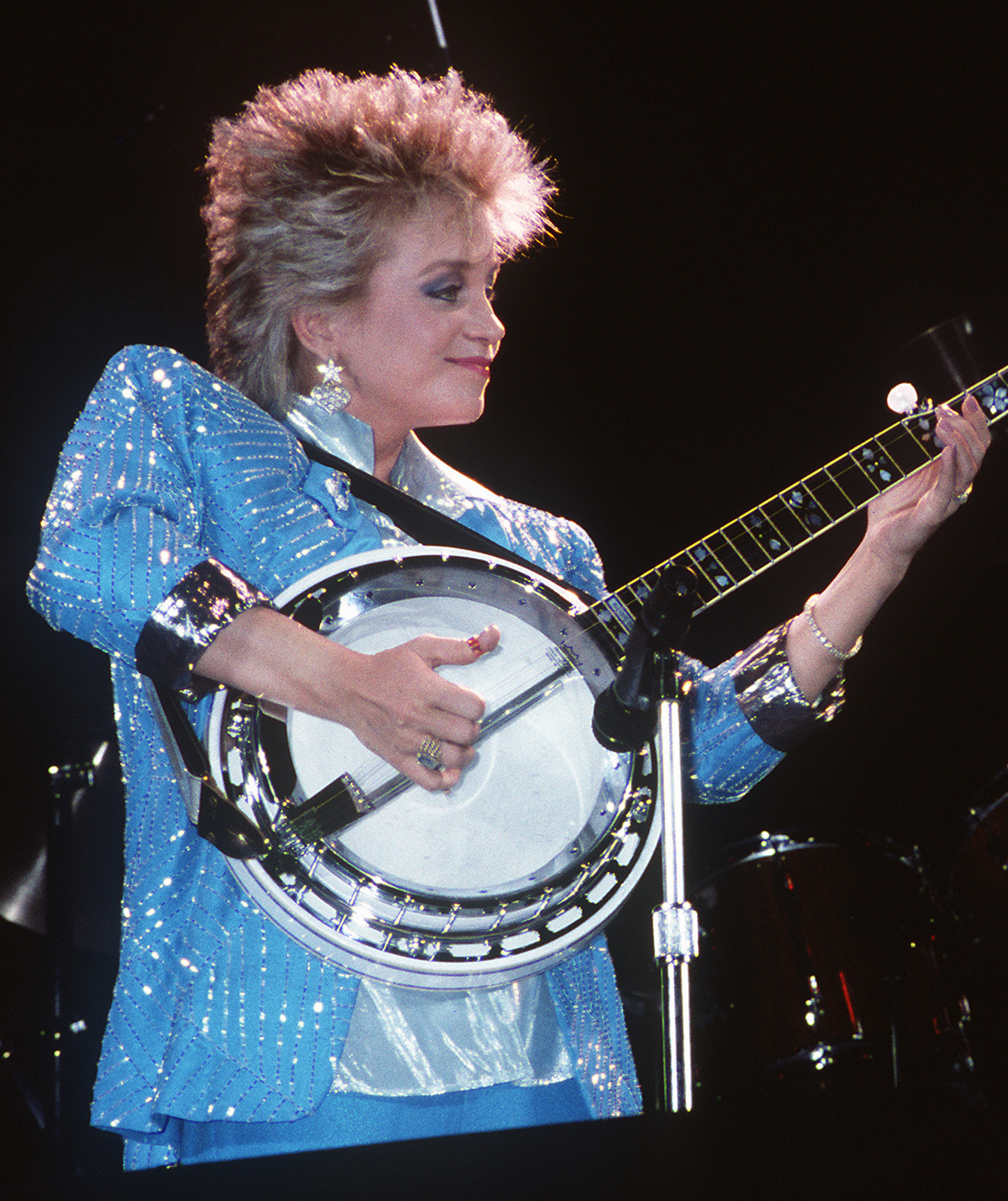
Barbara Mandrell

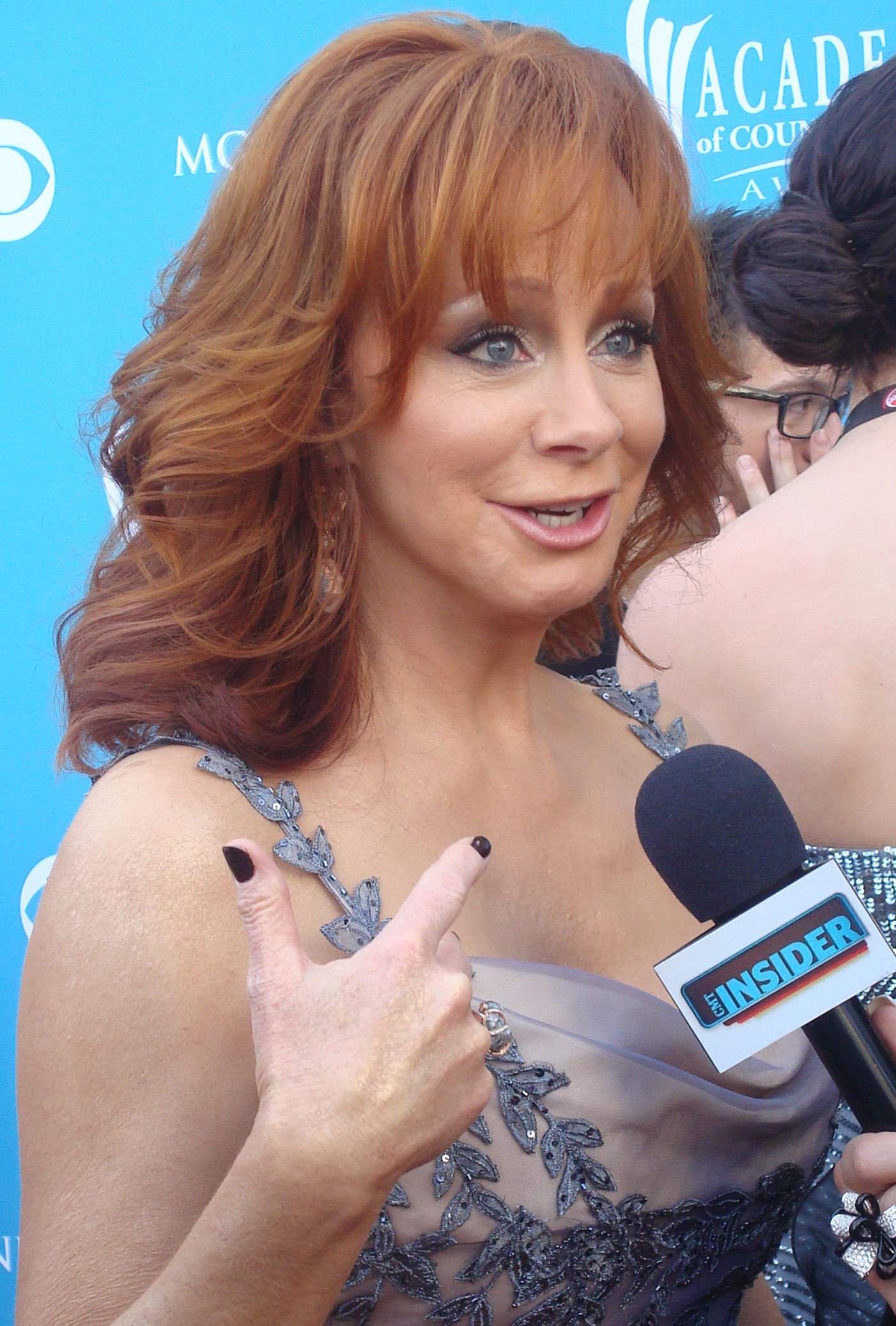
Reba McEntire

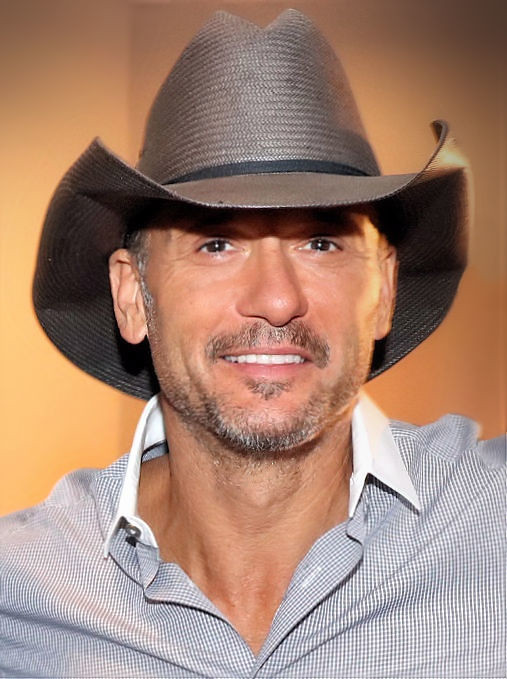
Tim McGraw

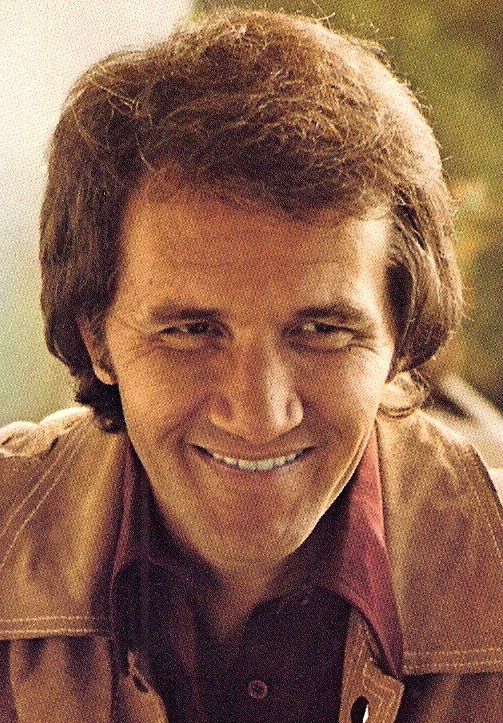
Roger Miller

- Mary MacGregor (born 1948)
- Wesley MacInnes
- Lonnie Mack (1941–2016)
- Warner Mack (1938–2022)
- Willie Mack
- Rita MacNeil (1944–2013)
- Uncle Dave Macon (1870–1952)
- Maddie & Tae
- Maddox Brothers and Rose
- Rose Maddox (1925–1998)
- Lillie Mae
- Martie Maguire (born 1969)
- Beverley Mahood
- Lloyd Maines (born 1951)
- Natalie Maines (born 1974)
- Charlie Major (born 1954)
- Tim Malchak (born 1957)
- Daisy Mallory
- Raul Malo (1965–2025)
- Eleni Mandell
- Barbara Mandrell (born 1948)
- Irlene Mandrell (born 1956)
- Louise Mandrell (born 1954)
- Joe Maphis
- Marcel
- Krista Marie
- Marie Sisters
- Sarah Marince (born c. 1990)
- Chris Marion (born 1962)
- Cory Marks
- Miko Marks
- Marley's Ghost
- Dylan Marlowe (born 1997)
- Kameron Marlowe (born 1997)
- Marshall Dyllon
- The Marshall Tucker Band
- Marshmello (born 1992)
- Linda Martell (born 1941)
- Brad Martin (1973–2022)
- Bryan Martin (born 1987)
- Dean Martin (1917–1995)
- Janis Martin
- Judy Martin (1917–1951)
- Leland Martin (born 1957)
- Steve Martin (born 1945)
- John Arthur Martinez
- Mason Dixon
- Jojo Mason
- Matt Mason
- Mila Mason (born 1963)
- Vincent Mason (born 2000)
- Jesse Mast
- Jake Mathews
- Jimbo Mathus
- Kathy Mattea (born 1959)
- Trixie Mattel
- Chase Matthew (born 1997)
- Matthew and the Mandarins
- Matthews, Wright & King
- The Mavericks
- John Mayer (born 1977)
- McAlister Kemp
- McAlyster
- Mac McAnally (born 1957)
- Shane McAnally (born 1974)
- McBride & the Ride
- Justin McBride
- Martina McBride (born 1966)
- Terry McBride (born 1958)
- Ashley McBryde (born 1983)
- Coley McCabe
- C.W. McCall (1928–2022)
- Darrell McCall (born 1940)
- Lila McCann (born 1981)
- Susan McCann
- Charly McClain (born 1956)
- Harry McClintock (1882–1957)
- Delbert McClinton (born 1940)
- O. B. McClinton (1940–1987)
- Mike McClure
- McClymonts
- Parker McCollum (born 1992)
- Brian McComas (born 1972)
- Jeremy McComb
- Sean McConnell
- Del McCoury
- Charlie McCoy (born 1941)
- Jason McCoy (born 1970)
- Neal McCoy (born 1958)
- Mindy McCready (1975–2013)
- Rich McCready (born 1970)
- Scotty McCreery (born 1993)
- Anne McCue
- Jennette McCurdy (born 1992)
- Mel McDaniel (1942–2011)
- Richie McDonald (born 1962)
- Skeets McDonald (1915–1968)
- Ronnie McDowell (born 1950)
- Pake McEntire (born 1953)
- Reba McEntire (born 1955)
- John McEuen (born 1945)
- Catherine McGrath
- Darren McGinnis
- Sean Patrick McGraw
- Tim McGraw (born 1967)
- McGuffey Lane
- Mark McGuinn (1968–2026)
- McHayes
- Jordan McIntosh
- Lori McKenna (born 1968)
- James McMurtry (born 1962)
- John McNicholl
- Max McNown (born 2001)
- Katharine McPhee
- Zach McPhee
- Scott McQuaig (born 1960)
- Sasha McVeigh
- Jason Meadows
- Travis Meadows
- Megan and Liz
- John Mellencamp (born 1951)
- Ken Mellons (born 1965)
- Tim Mensy (born 1959)
- Roy D. Mercer
- Madeline Merlo
- Tift Merritt
- Jo Dee Messina (born 1970)
- Chrissy Metz (born 1980)
- Augie Meyers
- Alyssa Micaela
- Bret Michaels (born 1963)
- K. Michelle (born 1982)
- Micky & the Motorcars
- Georgia Middleman (born 1967)
- Midland
- Mike and the Moonpies
- Buddy Miller (born 1952)
- Dean Miller (born 1966)
- Frankie Miller (born 1931)
- Izzy Miller (born 1993)
- Jody Miller (1941-2022)
- Julie Miller (born 1956)
- Ned Miller (1925–2016)
- Roger Miller (1936–1992)
- Tyler Joe Miller
- Drake Milligan (born 1998)
- Wayne Mills
- Ronnie Milsap (born 1943)
- Matt Minglewood
- Shane Minor (born 1968)
- Lawrie Minson (born 1958)
- Miss Willie Brown
- Beverley Mitchell (born 1981)
- Logan Mize
- Steve Moakler
- Katy Moffatt
- Molly & the Heymakers
- Ashley Monroe (born 1986)
- Bill Monroe (1911–1996)
- Rick Monroe
- Billy Montana (born 1959)
- Patsy Montana (1908–1996)
- Randy Montana (born 1985)
- Tim Montana
- Montgomery Gentry
- John Michael Montgomery (born 1965)
- Melba Montgomery (1938–2025)
- Niko Moon (born 1982)
- Moonshine Bandits
- Justin Moore (born 1984)
- Kip Moore (born 1980)
- Allison Moorer (born 1972)
- Craig Morgan (born 1965)
- George Morgan (1925–1975)
- John Morgan (born 1995)
- Kylie Morgan (born 1995)
- Lorrie Morgan (born 1959)
- Whitey Morgan and the 78's
- William Michael Morgan (born 1993)
- Megan Moroney (born 1997)
- Gary Morris (born 1948)
- Maren Morris (born 1990)
- Van Morrison (born 1945)
- Cory Morrow
- Johnny and Jonie Mosby
- Jess Moskaluke (born 1990)
- Gordon Mote
- Mountain Heart
- Dude Mowrey (born 1972)
- Mudcrutch
- Gary Mule Deer (born 1939)
- Moon Mullican (1909–1967)
- Megan Mullins (born 1987)
- Stan Munsey (born 1955)
- Ian Munsick (born 1993)
- Jessie Murph (born 2004)
- Michael Martin Murphey (born 1945)
- David Lee Murphy (born 1959)
- Anne Murray (born 1945)
- Kacey Musgraves (born 1988)
- My Darling Clementine
- Heather Myles
- Shirley Myers
- Ty Myers (born 2007)

== N ==
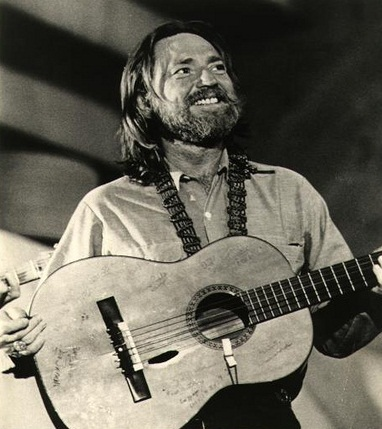
Willie Nelson

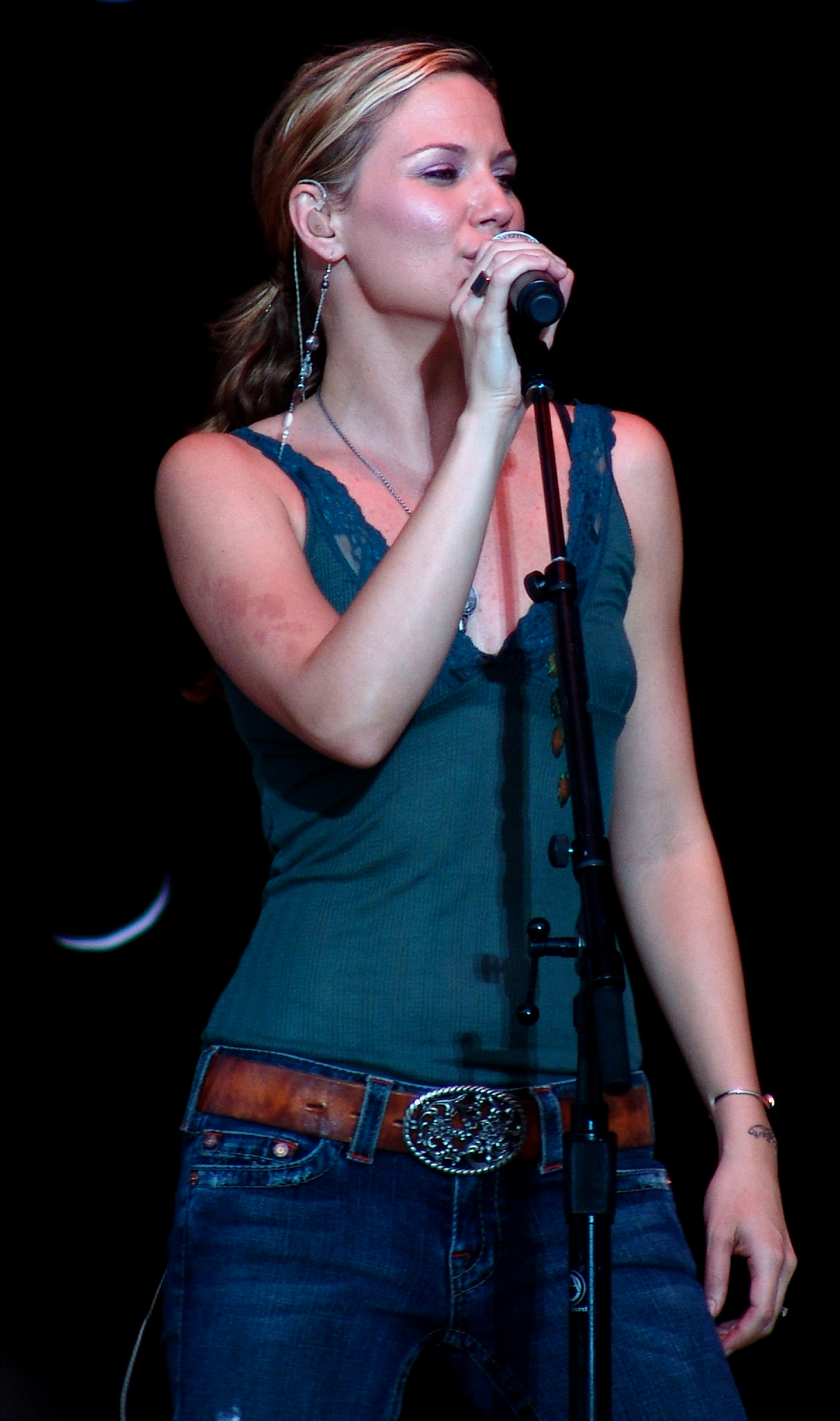
Jennifer Nettles

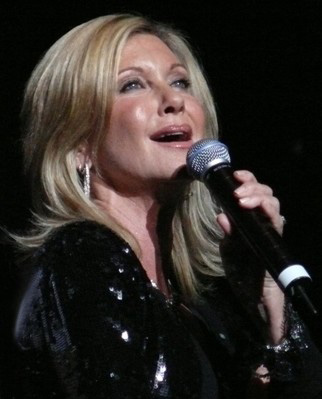
Olivia Newton-John

- David Nail (born 1979)
- Nashville Bluegrass Band
- Nashville West
- Emilio Navaira (1962–2016)
- Nelly (born 1974)
- Nikki Nelson (born 1969)
- Ricky Nelson (1940–1985)
- Willie Nelson (born 1933)
- Jim Nesbitt (1931–2007)
- Mark Nesler (born 1961)
- Michael Nesmith (1942–2021)
- Jennifer Nettles (born 1974)
- Aaron Neville (born 1941)
- New Grass Revival
- Heidi Newfield (born 1970)
- Jimmy C. Newman (1927–2014)
- Juice Newton (born 1952)
- Wayne Newton (born 1942)
- Olivia Newton-John (1948–2022)
- Gary Nichols (born 1978)
- Joe Nichols (born 1976)
- Gary Nicholson
- Shane Nicholson
- Nick 13
- Nickel Creek
- Nickelback
- Jerrod Niemann (born 1979)
- Nitty Gritty Dirt Band
- Michelle Nixon
- Eddie Noack (1930–1978)
- Bob Nolan (1908–1980)
- Gabbie Nolen
- Daron Norwood (1965–2015)
- Nothin' Fancy
- The Notorious Cherry Bombs
- Alecia Nugent
- Gary P. Nunn

== O ==
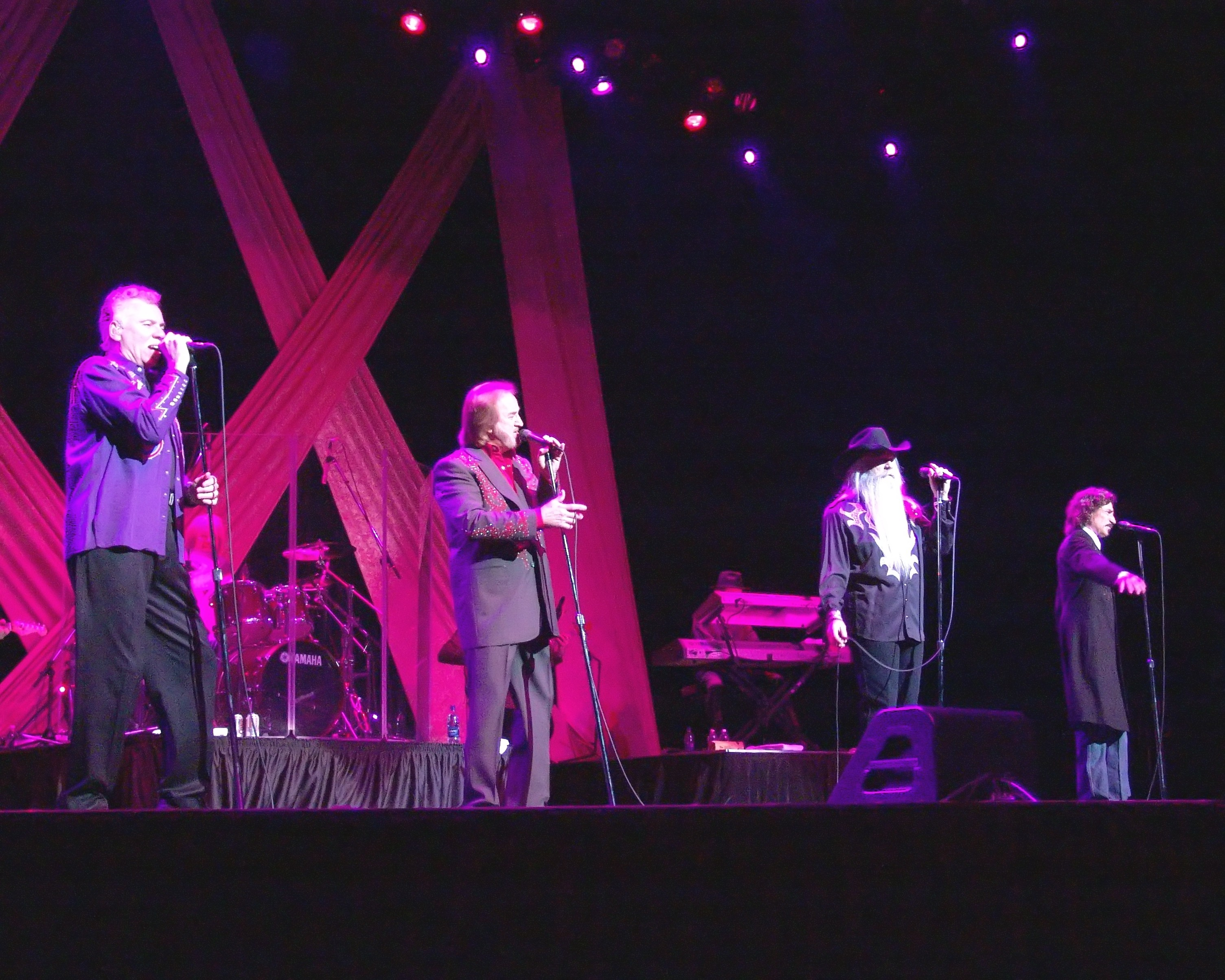
The Oak Ridge Boys

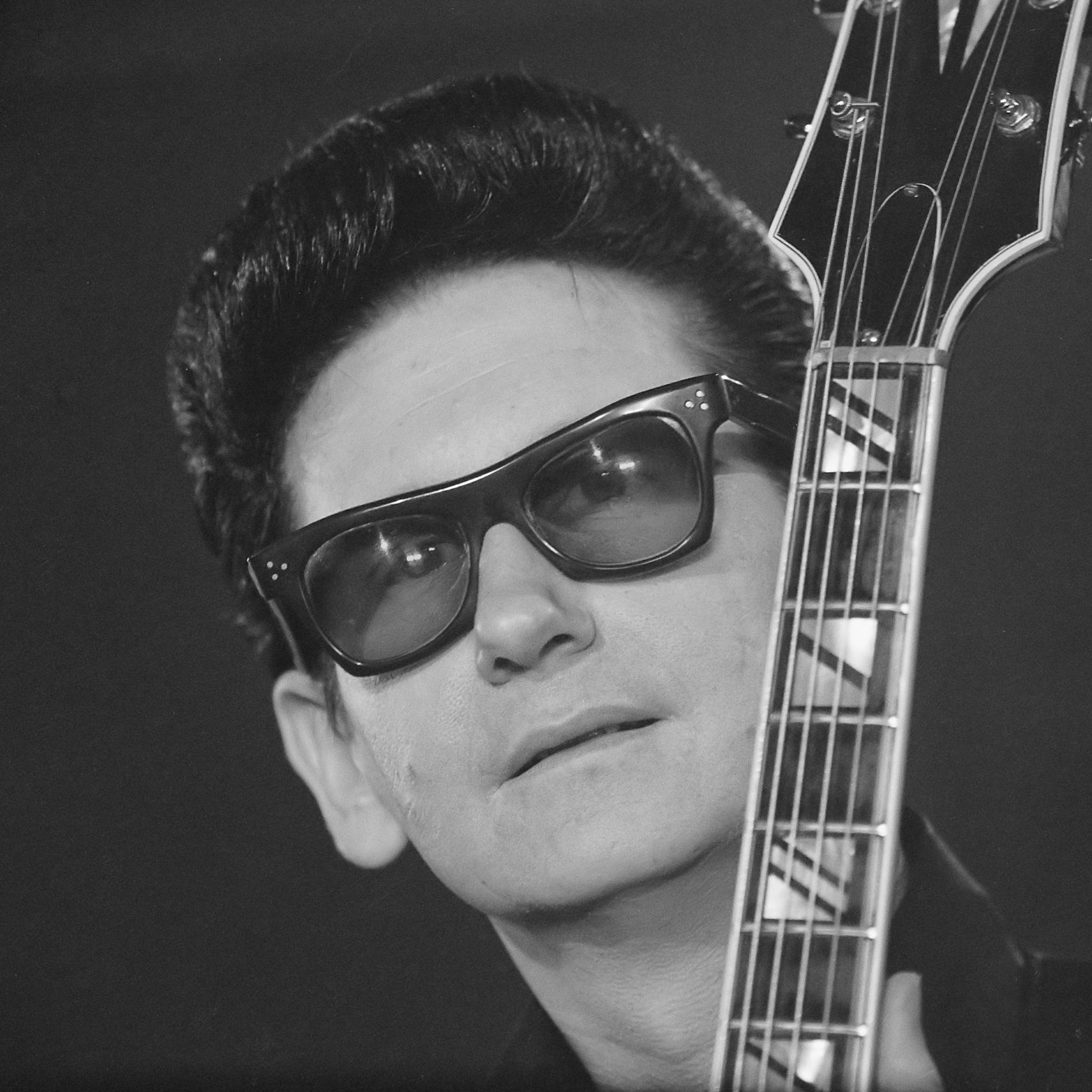
Roy Orbison

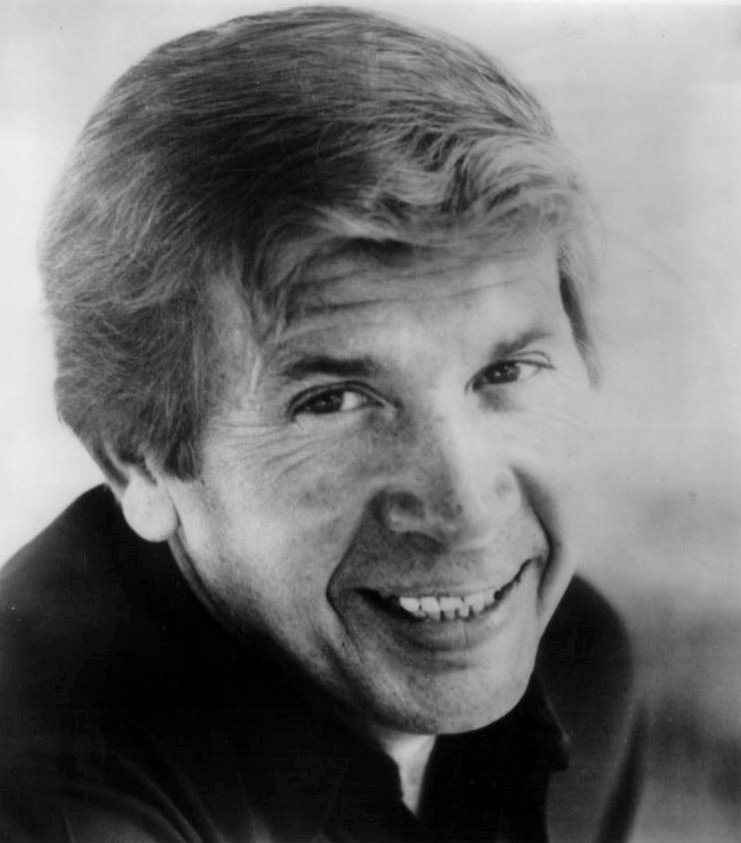
Buck Owens

- The Oak Ridge Boys
- Tim O'Brien (born 1954)
- Mark O'Connor (born 1961)
- Nora O'Connor
- Jamie O'Hara (1950–2021)
- The O'Kanes
- Old Crow Medicine Show
- Old Dogs
- Old Dominion
- Will Oldham
- Hayley Oliver
- Steven Lee Olsen (born 1985)
- Troy Olsen (born 1973)
- One Flew South
- One Horse Blue
- One More Girl
- Jamie O'Neal (born 1968)
- Gene O'Quin
- Tara Oram
- Roy Orbison (1936–1988)
- Robert Ellis Orrall (born 1955)
- Orrall & Wright
- Lindi Ortega
- Osborne Brothers
- O'Shea
- K. T. Oslin (1941–2020)
- Marie Osmond (born 1959)
- The Osmonds
- Rich O'Toole
- James Otto (born 1973)
- Robyn Ottolini
- Sam Outlaw
- Paul Overstreet (born 1955)
- Tommy Overstreet (1937–2015)
- Jake Owen (born 1981)
- Randy Owen (born 1949)
- Buck Owens (1929–2006)
- Vernon Oxford

== P ==
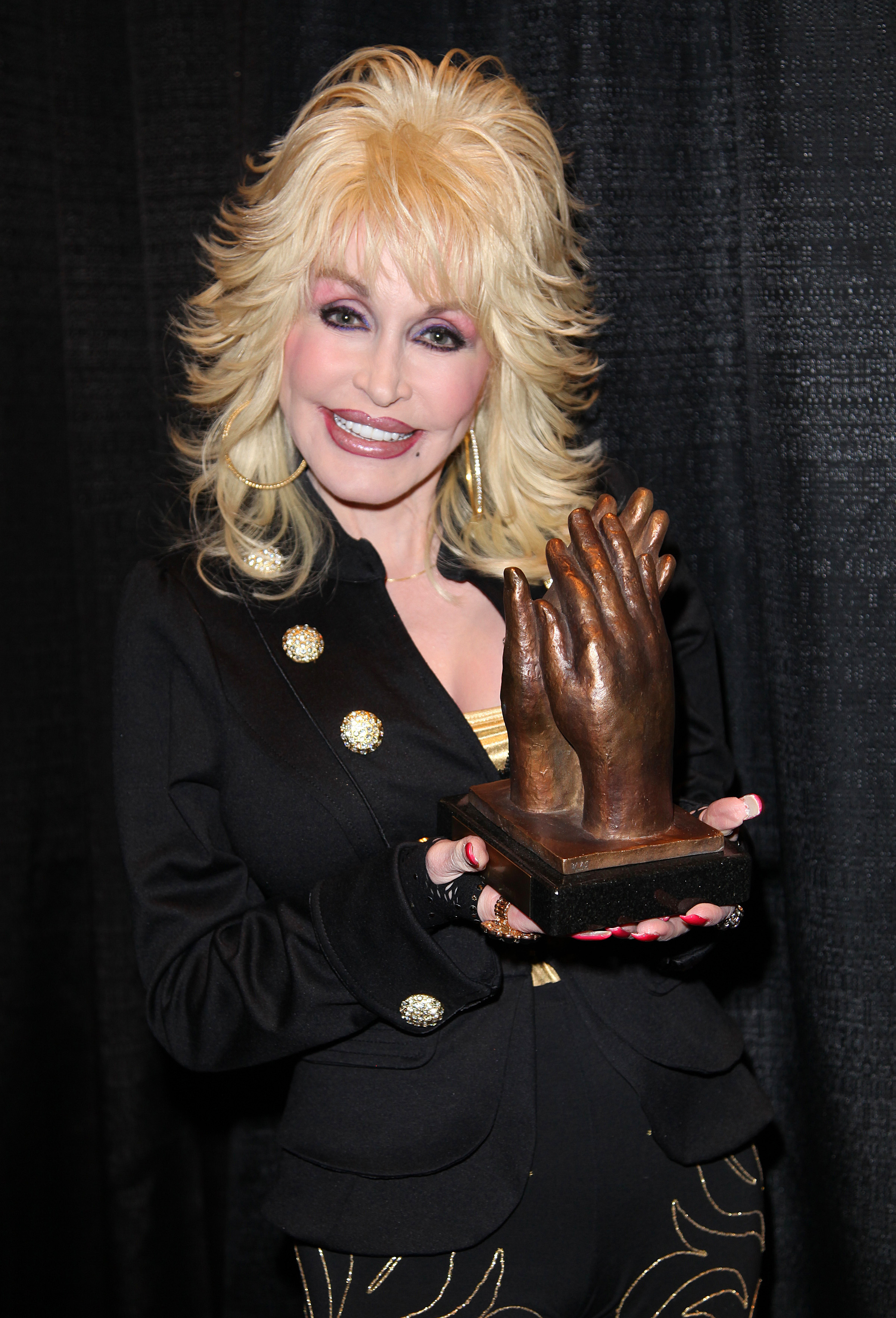
Dolly Parton

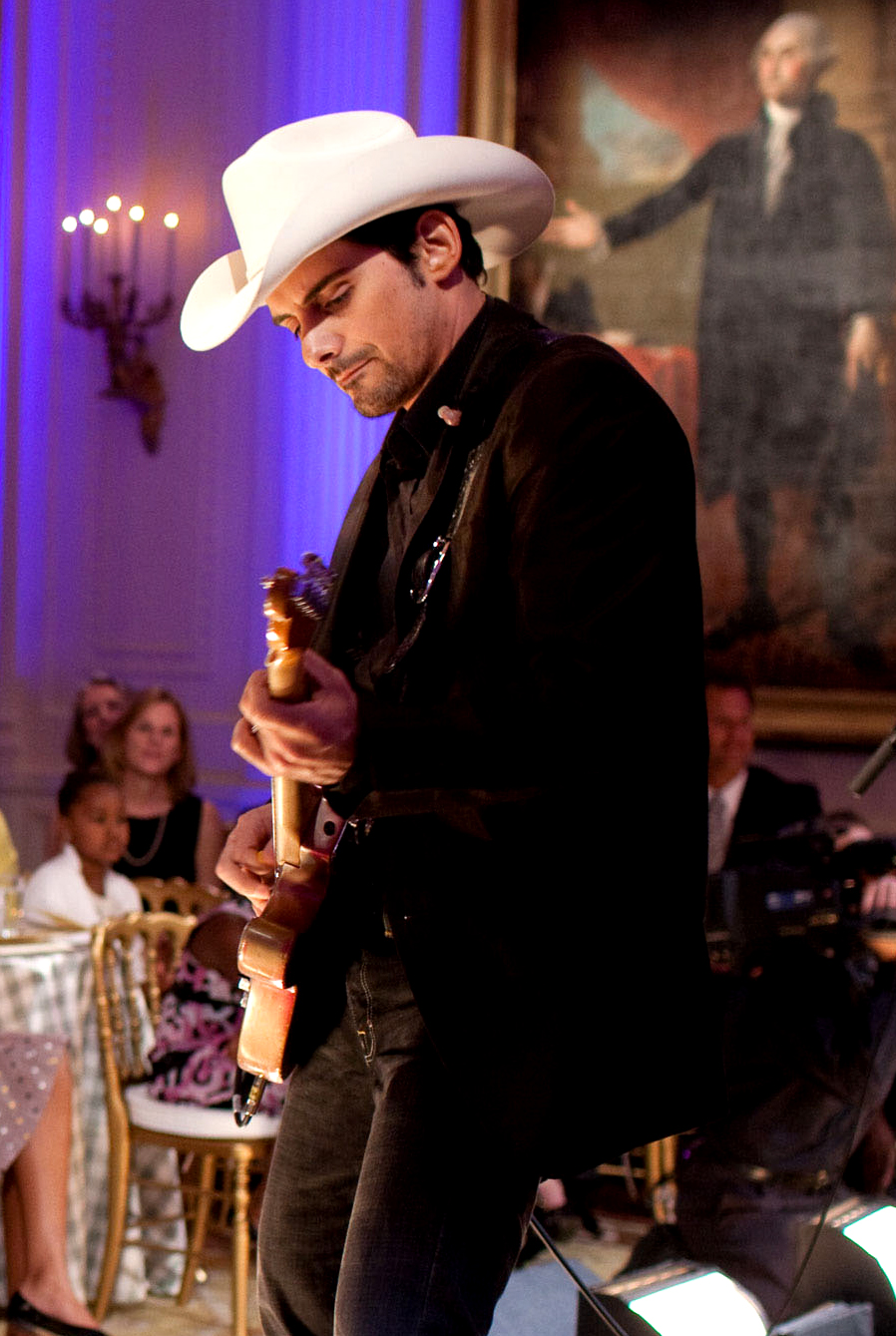
Brad Paisley

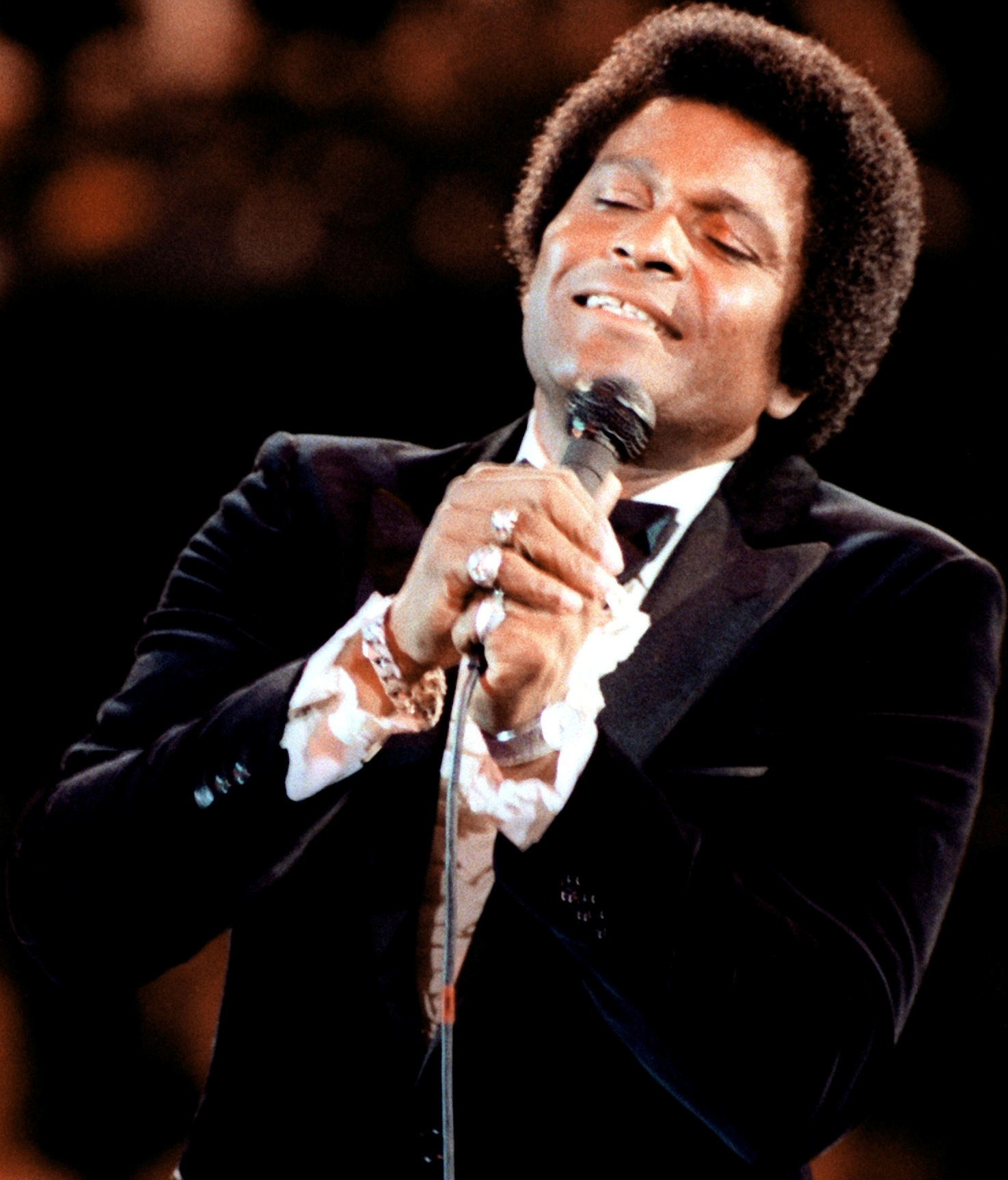
Charley Pride

- Patti Page (1927–2013)
- Brad Paisley (born 1972)
- Sam Palladio (born 1986)
- Griffen Palmer
- Keith Palmer (1957–1996)
- Rissi Palmer (born 1981)
- Palomino Road
- Gwyneth Paltrow (born 1972)
- Hayden Panettiere (1989–2026)
- Jon Pardi (born 1985)
- Donny Parenteau
- Levi Parham
- Kyle Park
- Billy Parker (born 1939)
- Caryl Mack Parker
- Brent Parlane
- Parmalee
- Lee Roy Parnell (born 1956)
- Gram Parsons (1946–1973)
- Dolly Parton (1946–2026)
- Stella Parton (born 1949)
- Eric Paslay (born 1983)
- Meghan Patrick (born 1987)
- Henry Paul (born 1949)
- Les Paul (1915–2009)
- Johnny Paycheck (1938–2003)
- Leon Payne (1917–1969)
- Waylon Payne
- The Peach Pickers
- Carly Pearce (born 1990)
- Minnie Pearl (1912–1996)
- The Peasall Sisters
- Danielle Peck (born 1978)
- Orville Peck
- Herb Pedersen (born 1944)
- Aubrey Peeples (born 1993)
- Perfect Stranger
- Carl Perkins (1932–1998)
- Keith Perry
- Kimberly Perry (born 1983)
- Gretchen Peters (born 1957)
- Michael Peterson (born 1959)
- Ray Peterson
- Petric
- Shana Petrone (born 1972)
- Bill Phillips (1936–2010)
- Brock Phillips
- Philomena Begley
- Kellie Pickler (born 1986)
- Webb Pierce (1921–1991)
- Sasha Pieterse (born 1996)
- Ray Pillow (born 1937)
- P!nk (born 1979)
- Pinmonkey
- Bobby Pinson (born 1972)
- Pirates of the Mississippi
- Pistol Annies
- Mo Pitney (born 1993)
- Robert Plant (born 1948)
- Poco
- Point of Grace
- Charlie Poole (1892–1931)
- Joe Poovey
- Cassadee Pope (born 1989)
- Alisan Porter
- MacKenzie Porter (born 1990)
- Sandy Posey
- Possessed by Paul James
- Post Malone (born 1995)
- The Povertyneck Hillbillies
- Cowan Powers and his Family Band
- Prairie Oyster
- Colt Prather (born 1975)
- Angaleena Presley (born 1976)
- Elvis Presley (1935–1977)
- Lisa Marie Presley (1968–2023)
- Codie Prevost (born 1984)
- Margo Price (born 1983)
- Ray Price (1926–2013)
- Charley Pride (1934–2020)
- John Prine (1946–2020)
- Aaron Pritchett
- Rachel Proctor (born 1974)
- Shane Profitt (born 2000)
- Ronnie Prophet (1937–2018)
- Jeanne Pruett (born 1937)
- Punch Brothers
- Pure Prairie League
- Pussycat

== Q ==
- Quartette
- Stephanie Quayle
- The Quebe Sisters

== R ==
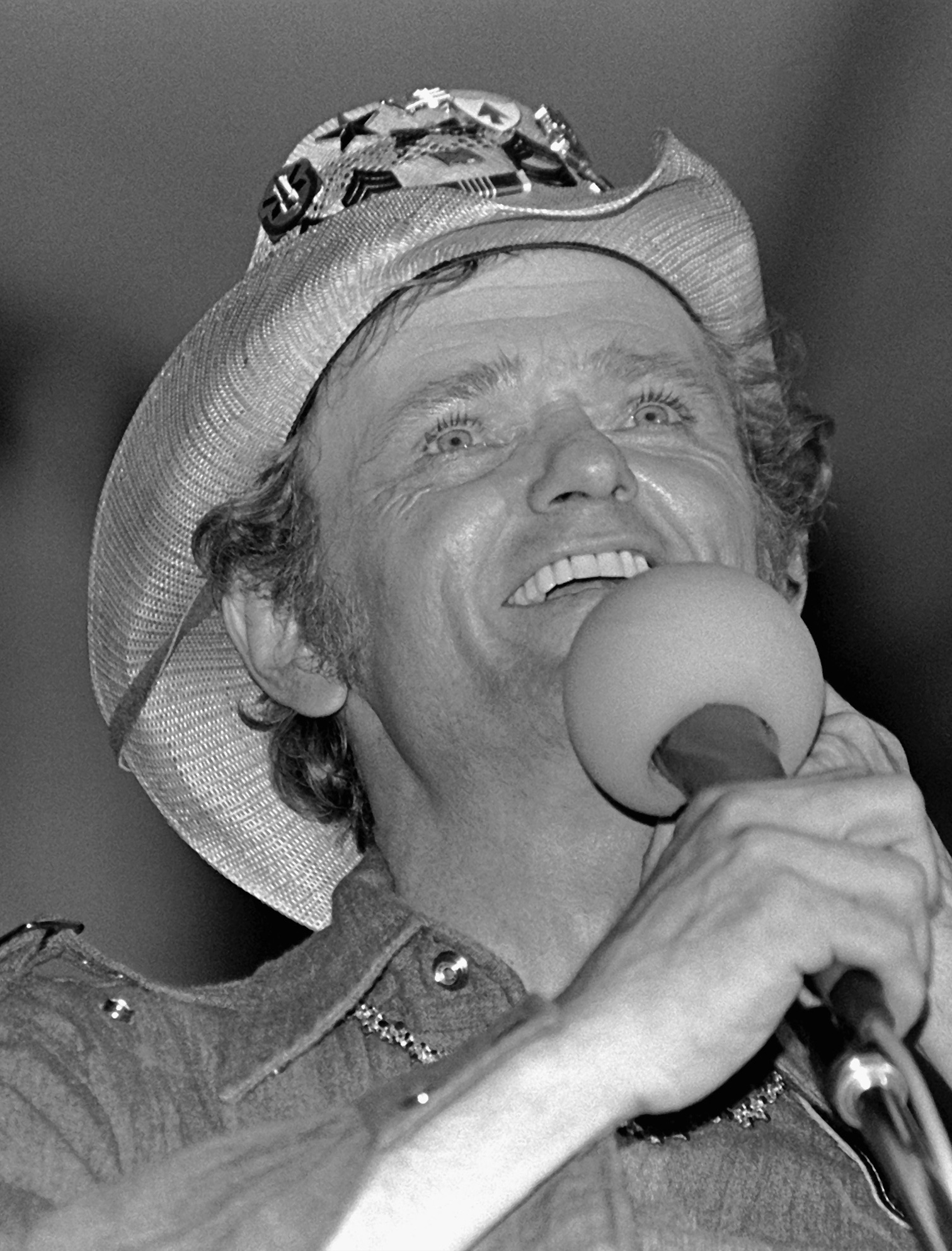
Jerry Reed

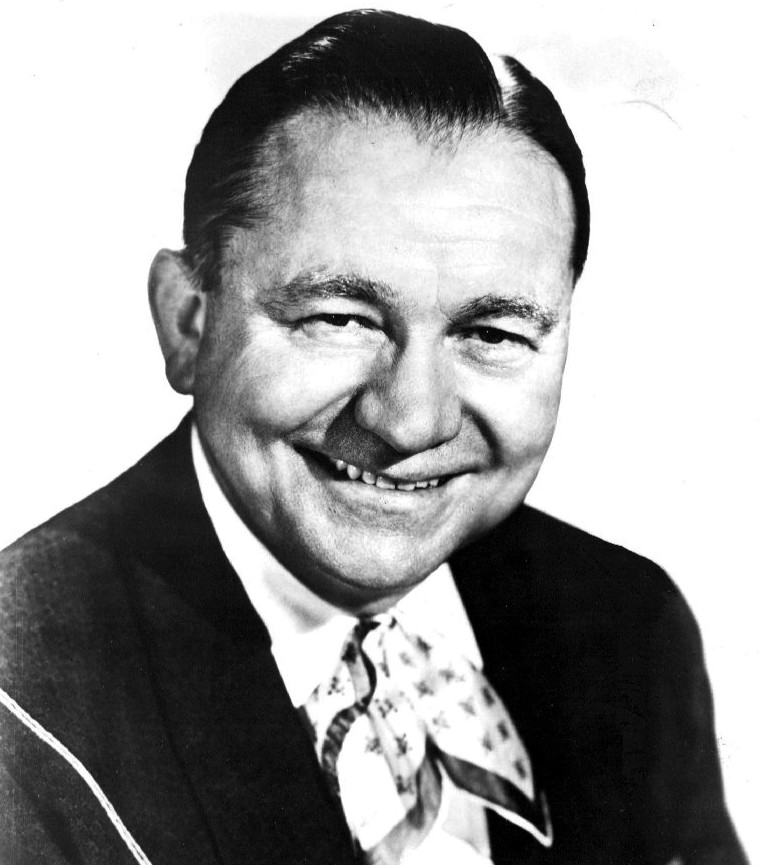
Tex Ritter

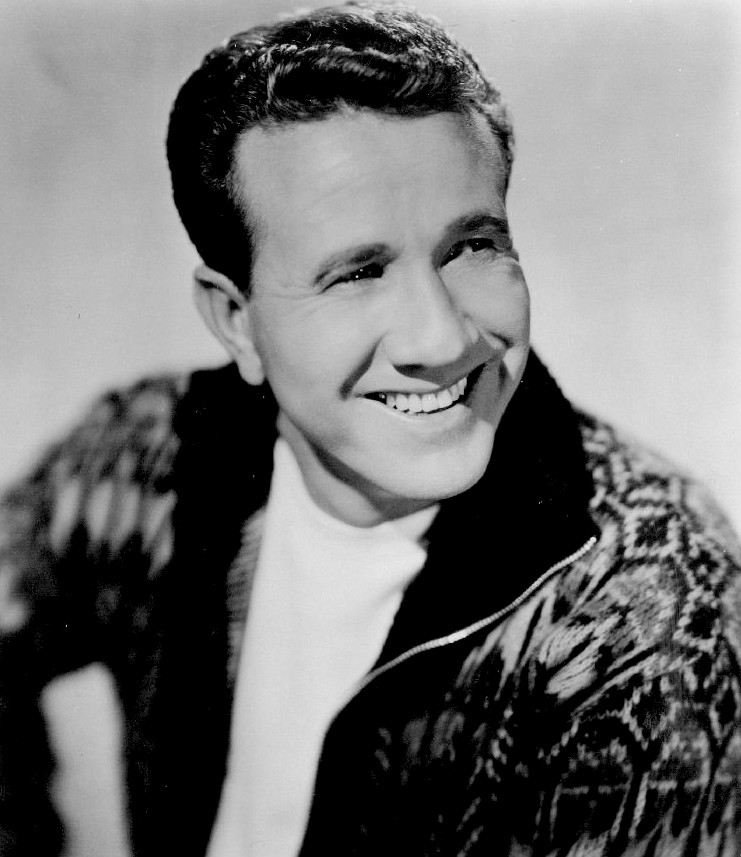
Marty Robbins

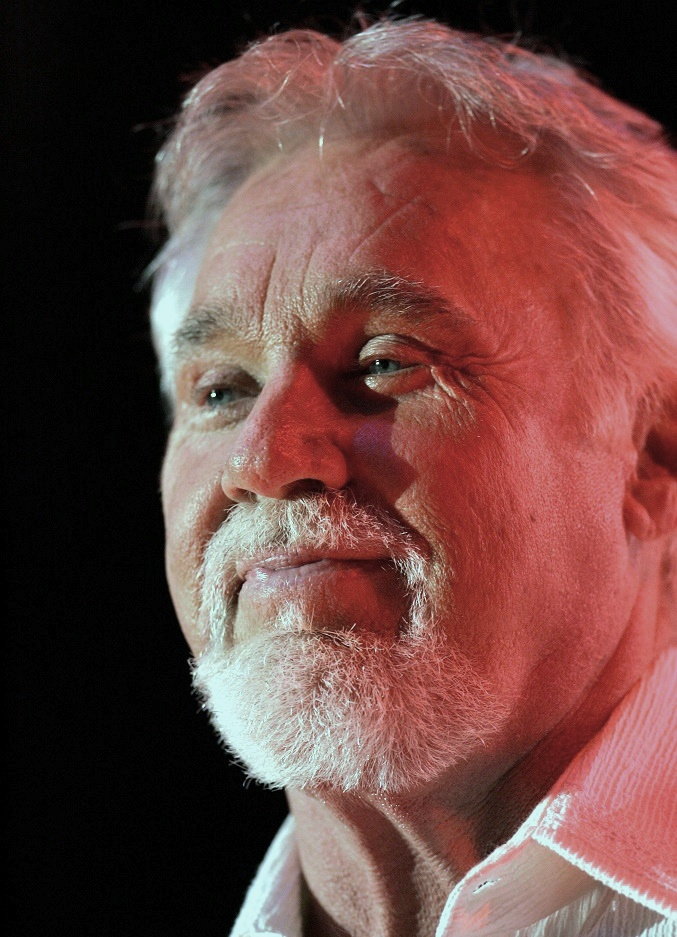
Kenny Rogers

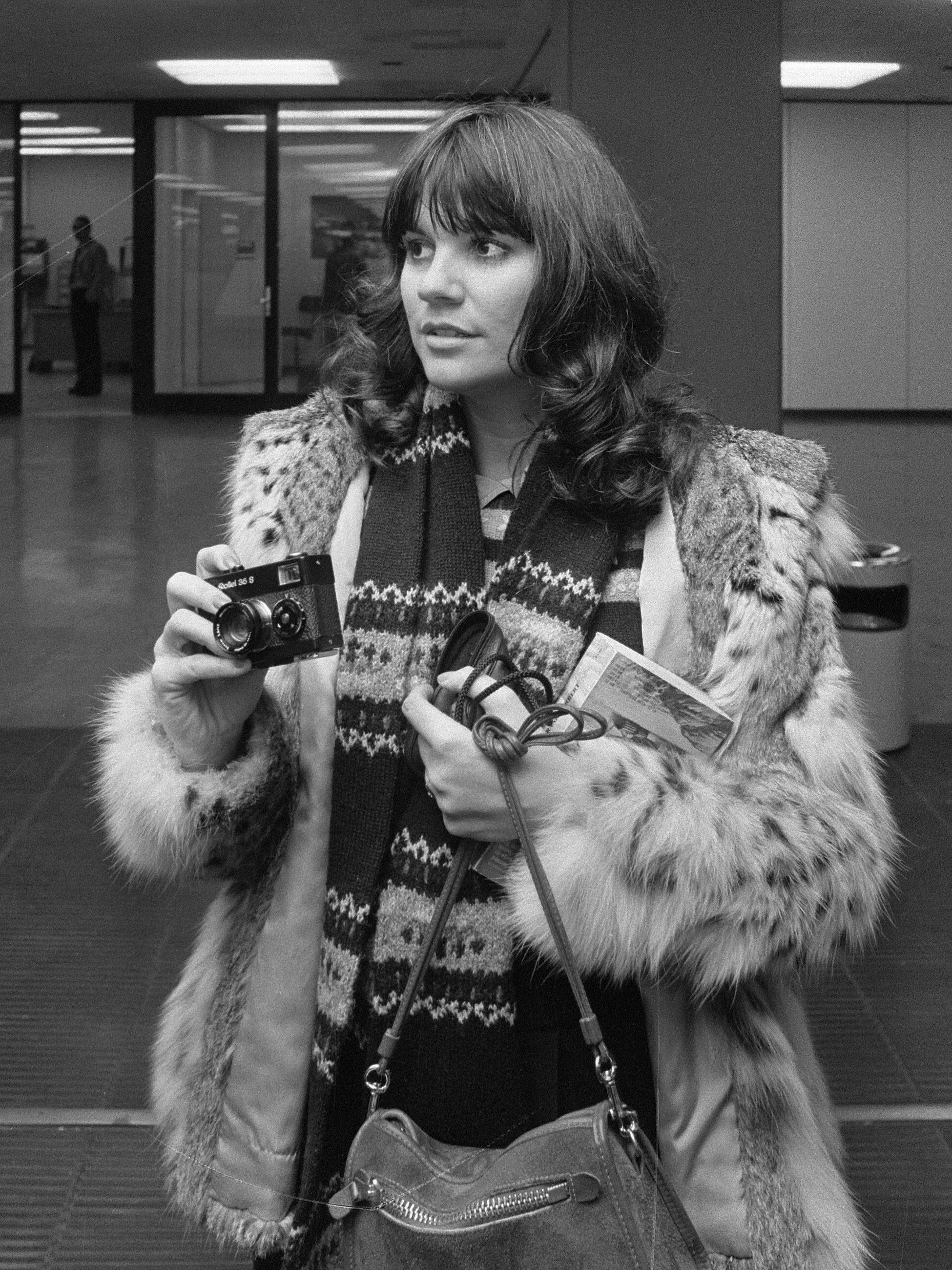
Linda Ronstadt

- Eddie Rabbitt (1941–1998)
- Mats Radberg
- Jasmine Rae
- RaeLynn (born 1994)
- Jordan Rager
- The Railers
- Railroad Earth
- Marvin Rainwater (1925–2013)
- Bonnie Raitt (born 1949)
- Tony Ramey
- Mason Ramsey
- Matthew Ramsey (born 1977)
- The Ranch
- Jon Randall (born 1969)
- Randy Rogers Band
- Jimmy Rankin
- Rankin Family, The
- Rascal Flatts
- Carmen Rasmusen
- Rattlesnake Annie (born 1941)
- Eddy Raven (born 1944)
- David Rawlings
- Frank Ray (born 1987)
- Michael Ray (born 1988)
- Marty Raybon (born 1959)
- Raybon Brothers
- Collin Raye (born 1960)
- Susan Raye (born 1944)
- Rebel Meets Rebel
- Reckless Kelly
- The Red Clay Strays
- Red Meat
- Red Wanting Blue
- Redmon & Vale
- Megan Redmond
- Redneck Souljers
- Rednex
- Jerry Reed (1937–2008)
- Del Reeves (1932–2007)
- Jim Reeves (1923–1964)
- Julie Reeves (born 1974)
- Ronna Reeves (born 1966)
- Scott Reeves (born 1966)
- Regina Regina
- Rehab
- Blake Reid
- Johnny Reid
- Mike Reid (born 1947)
- The Reklaws
- Remingtons, The
- Restless Heart
- Restless Road
- The Reverend Horton Heat
- Bebe Rexha (born 1989)
- Thomas Rhett (born 1990)
- Kimmie Rhodes
- Brandon Rhyder
- Bobby G. Rice (born 1944)
- Chase Rice (born 1985)
- Charlie Rich (1932–1995)
- Don Rich
- John Rich (born 1974)
- Tyler Rich (born 1986)
- Steve Richard
- Kim Richey (born 1956)
- Lionel Richie (born 1949)
- Ricochet
- Riders in the Sky
- Owen Riegling
- Sam Riggs
- Lex Rijger (1944–2021)
- Jeannie C. Riley (born 1945)
- LeAnn Rimes (born 1982)
- Cowboy Slim Rinehart (1911–1948)
- Jason Ringenberg
- Rio Grand
- Tex Ritter (1907–1973)
- River Road
- River Town Saints
- The Road Hammers
- Chappell Roan (born 1998)
- Dennis Robbins (born 1949)
- Marty Robbins (1925–1982)
- Julie Roberts (born 1979)
- Emily Ann Roberts (born 1998)
- Mica Roberts
- Ashley Robertson
- Eck Robertson (1886–1975)
- Jessica Robinson
- Bruce Robison (born 1966)
- Carson Robison (1890–1957)
- Charlie Robison (1964–2023)
- Robyn and Ryleigh
- Rocket Club
- Jameson Rodgers (born 1987)
- Jimmie Rodgers (1897–1933)
- Jimmie Rodgers (1933–2021)
- Judy Rodman (born 1951)
- Carrie Rodriguez
- Johnny Rodriguez (1951–2025)
- Kenny Rogers (1938–2020)
- Roy Rogers (1911–1998)
- Tammy Rogers
- Daniel Romano
- Romantica
- Linda Ronstadt (born 1946)
- Chaley Rose
- Chelle Rose
- Fred Rose
- Maggie Rose (born 1988)
- Whitney Rose
- Trevor Rosen (born 1975)
- Josh Ross (born 1996)
- Peter Rowan
- Billy Joe Royal (1942–2015)
- Darius Rucker (born 1966)
- Rune Rudberg
- Runaway June
- Run C&W
- Travis Rush (born 1971)
- Rushlow
- Tim Rushlow (born 1966)
- Allison Russell
- Bobby Russell (1940–1992)
- Johnny Russell (1940–2001)
- Leon Russell (1942–2016)
- Shawna Russell
- Tom Russell
- Deric Ruttan
- Debby Ryan (born 1993)
- Mike Ryan
- Tim Ryan (born 1964)
- John Wesley Ryles (1950–2025)

== S ==
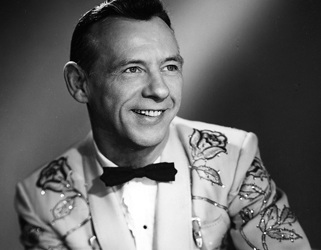
Hank Snow

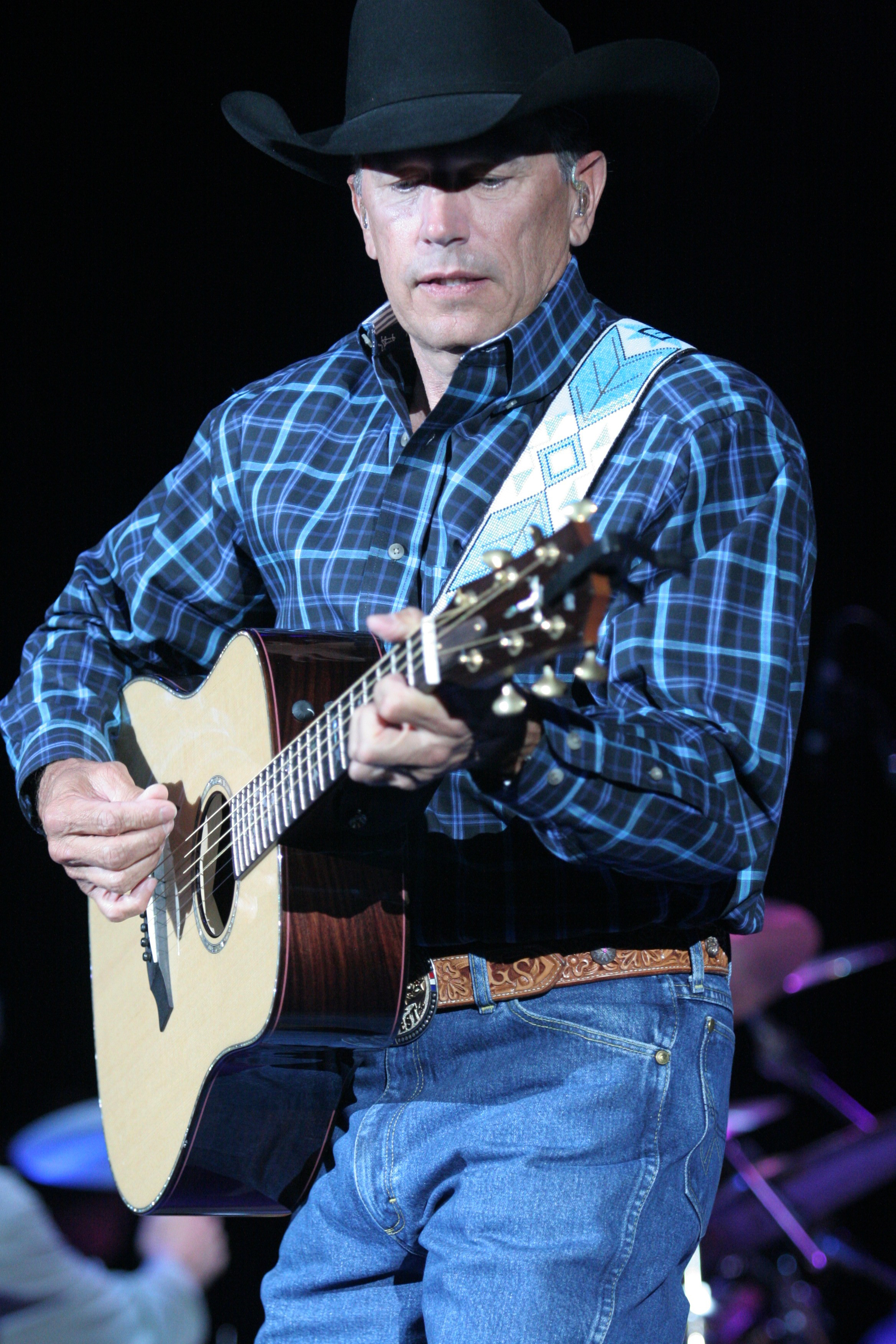
George Strait

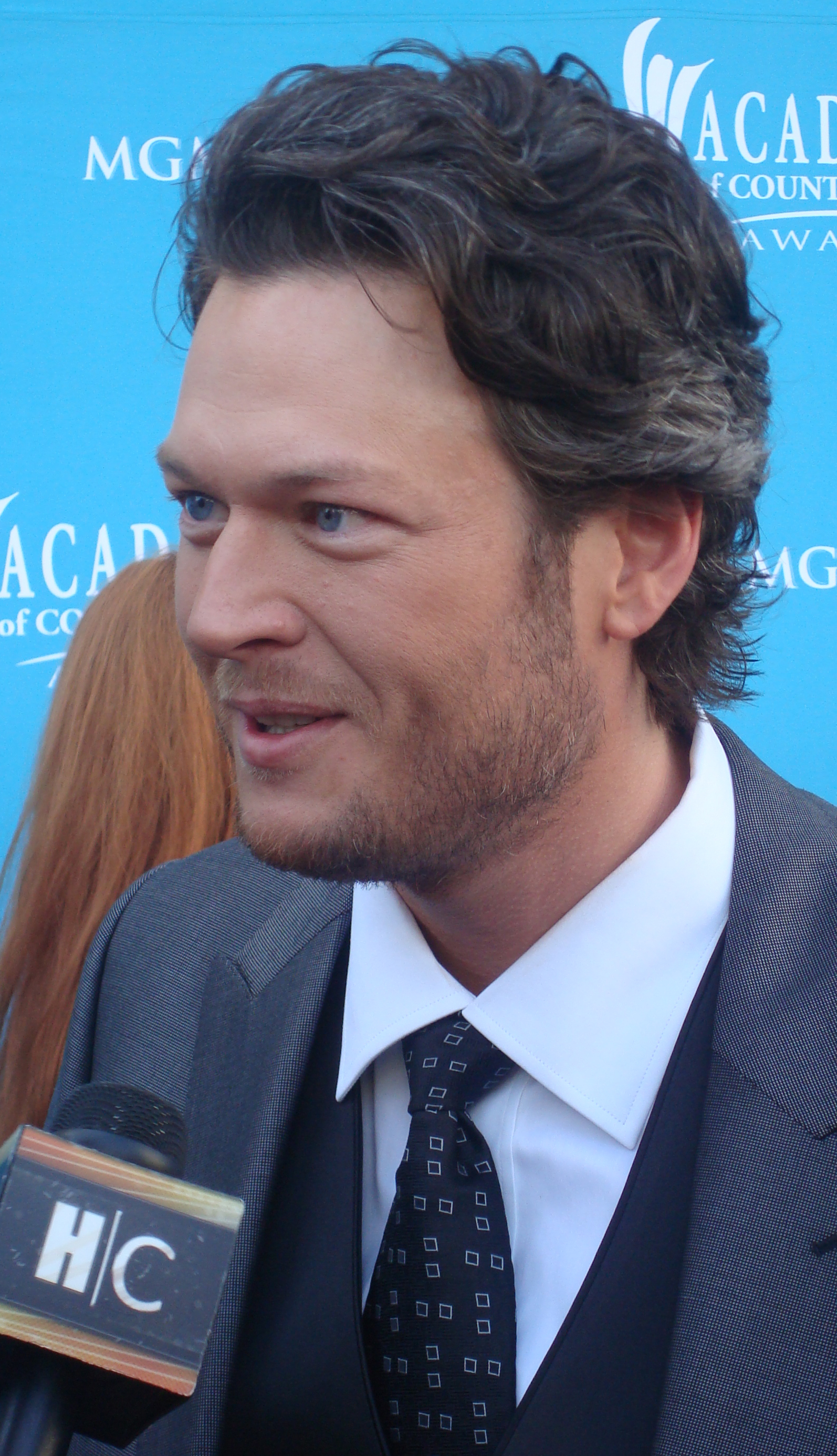
Blake Shelton

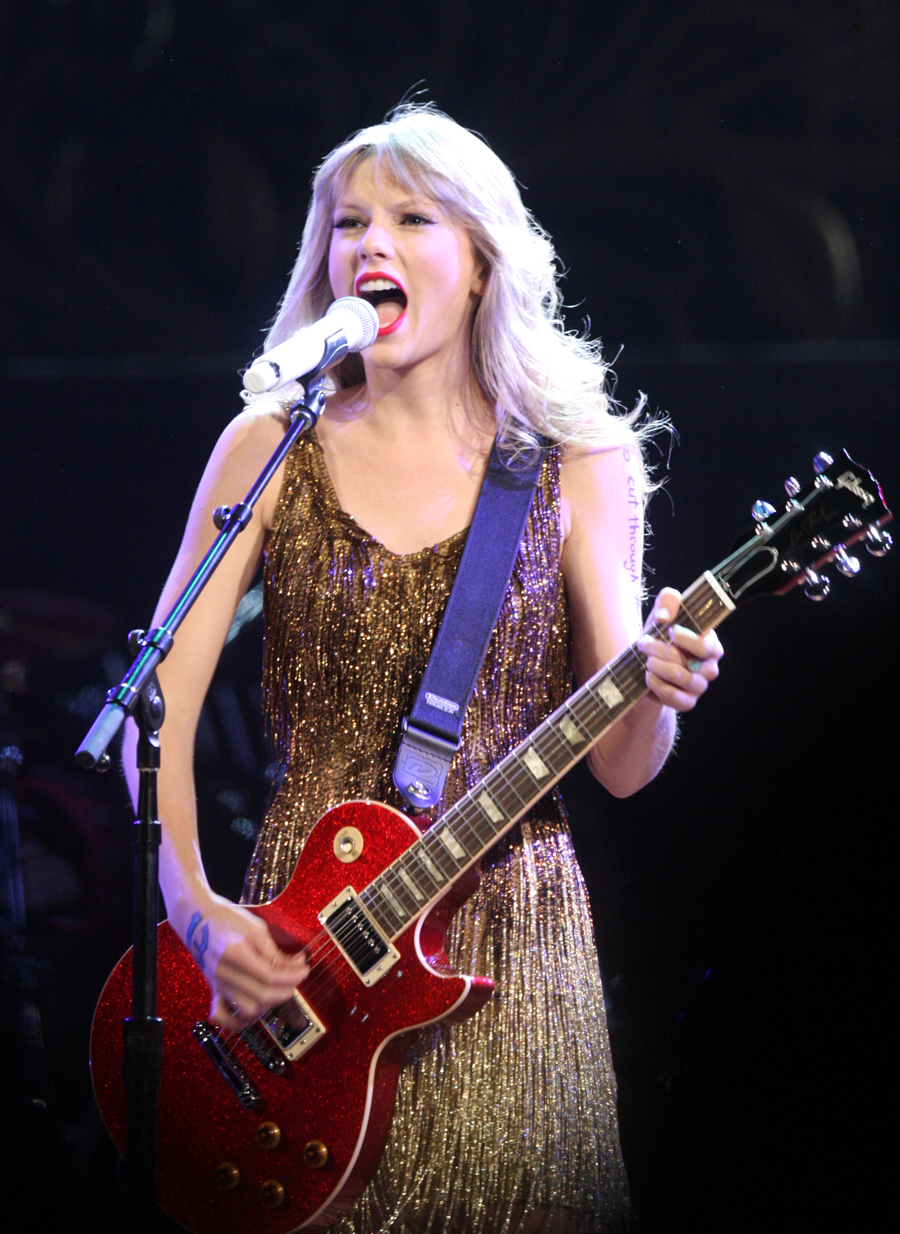
Taylor Swift

- S-K-O
- Sacha
- The Sadies
- Doug Sahm (1941–1999)
- Maggie Sajak (born 1995)
- Jerry Salley
- Steve Sanders (1952–1998)
- Mary Sarah
- Michael Sarver
- Leslie Satcher (born 1962)
- Sawyer Brown
- Kimberly Schlapman (born 1969)
- Don Schlitz (born 1952)
- Dylan Schneider
- John Schneider (born 1960)
- Melinda Schneider
- Bobbejaan Schoepen (1925–2010)
- Darrell Scott
- Dylan Scott (born 1990)
- Hillary Scott (born 1986)
- Marlee Scott (born 1986)
- Ray Scott (born 1969)
- Chris Scruggs
- Earl Scruggs (1924–2012)
- Brady Seals (born 1969)
- Dan Seals (1948–2009)
- Troy Seals (1938–2025)
- Dawn Sears (1961–2014)
- Gwen Sebastian (born 1974)
- The Secret Sisters
- Doug Seegers
- Jeannie Seely (1940–2025)
- Bob Seger (born 1945)
- The Seldom Scene
- Aubrie Sellers (born 1991)
- Jason Sellers (born 1971)
- Seminole
- Shaboozey (born 1995)
- Caitlyn Shadbolt
- Elvie Shane (born 1988)
- Kevin Sharp (1970–2014)
- Rosemary Sharp
- Billy Joe Shaver (1939–2020)
- Victoria Shaw (born 1962)
- Crystal Shawanda (born 1983)
- Rick Shea
- SHeDAISY
- Ed Sheeran (born 1991)
- Blake Shelton (born 1976)
- Ricky Van Shelton (born 1952)
- Shenandoah
- Jean Shepard (1933–2016)
- Ashton Shepherd (born 1986)
- T. G. Sheppard (born 1944)
- Amanda Shires (born 1982)
- The Shires
- Sarah Shook
- The Shooters
- The Shoppe
- Kalie Shorr
- Ryan Shupe & the RubberBand
- Jessica Sierra (born 1985)
- Simani
- Aleyce Simmonds
- Jenny Simpson (born 1973)
- Jessica Simpson (born 1980)
- Red Simpson (1934–2016)
- Sturgill Simpson (born 1978)
- Nancy Sinatra (born 1940)
- John Sines Jr.
- Daryle Singletary (1971–2018)
- Jonathan Singleton
- Margie Singleton (born 1935)
- Sir Elvis (born 1977)
- Sir Rosevelt
- Sixwire
- Ricky Skaggs (born 1954)
- Kevin Skinner
- The Sky Kings
- Small Town Pistols
- Anthony Smith
- Arthur "Guitar Boogie" Smith (1921–2014)
- Fiddlin' Arthur Smith
- Caitlyn Smith (born 1986)
- Cal Smith (1932–2013)
- Canaan Smith (born 1982)
- Carl Smith (1927–2010)
- Conner Smith (born 2000)
- Connie Smith (born 1941)
- Corey Smith
- Dallas Smith (born 1977)
- Darden Smith
- Granger Smith (born 1979)
- Joanna Smith
- Margo Smith (1939–2024)
- Mindy Smith (born 1972)
- Nate Smith (born 1985)
- Ray Smith
- Ray Smith
- Russell Smith (1949–2019)
- Sammi Smith (1943–2005)
- Warren Smith
- Smokin' Armadillos
- Todd Snider (1966–2025)
- Hank Snow (1914–1999)
- Soggy Bottom Boys
- Son Volt
- Jo-El Sonnier (1946–2024)
- Sons of Sylvia
- Sons of the Desert
- Sons of the Pioneers
- South 65
- JD Souther (1945–2024)
- The Southern Gothic
- Southern Pacific
- Red Sovine (1918–1980)
- Bobby Sowell (born 1947)
- Sissy Spacek (born 1949)
- Sparx
- Billie Jo Spears (1937–2011)
- Jamie Lynn Spears (born 1991)
- Speedy West
- Spirit Family Reunion
- Roger Springer (born 1962)
- The Spurs
- Phil Stacey (born 1978)
- Karen Staley
- Max Stalling
- Joe Stampley (born 1943)
- Ralph Stanley (1927–2016)
- Roba Stanley (1908–1986)
- The Stanley Brothers
- Chris Stapleton (born 1978)
- Star Anna
- Kenny Starr
- Lucille Starr (1938–2020)
- The Statler Brothers
- Red Steagall (born 1938)
- Stealing Angels
- Steel Magnolia
- The Steel Woods
- The SteelDrivers
- Duane Steele
- Jeffrey Steele (born 1961)
- Gwen Stefani (born 1969)
- Lasse Stefanz
- Keith Stegall (born 1955)
- Tommy Shane Steiner (born 1973)
- Matt Stell (born 1984)
- The Stellas
- Sean Stemaly
- Larry Stephenson
- Van Stephenson (1953–2001)
- Richard Sterban (1943–2026)
- Ray Stevens (born 1939)
- Tate Stevens
- Gary Stewart (1944–2003)
- Larry Stewart (born 1959)
- Lisa Stewart (born 1968)
- Wynn Stewart (1934–1985)
- Matt Stillwell
- Mike Stinson
- Shane Stockton (born 1974)
- Doug Stone (born 1956)
- The Stonemans
- Sara Storer
- Amanda Stott
- Natalie Stovall and the Drive
- George Strait (born 1952)
- Emily Strayer (born 1972)
- Mel Street (1935–1978)
- Luke Stricklin (born 1982)
- The String Cheese Incident
- Billy Strings (born 1992)
- Nora Jane Struthers
- Marty Stuart (born 1958)
- Nat Stuckey (1933–1988)
- Josh Stumpf (born 2002)
- Jason Sturgeon
- Sugarland
- Trent Summar & the New Row Mob
- Sundy Best
- The Sunny Cowgirls
- Super Grit Cowboy Band
- Doug Supernaw (1960–2020)
- Kiefer Sutherland (born 1966)
- Bryan Sutton
- Billy Swan (born 1942)
- The Swearengens
- Sunny Sweeney (born 1976)
- Sweethearts of the Rodeo
- Taylor Swift (born 1989)
- Cole Swindell (born 1983)
- The Swon Brothers
- Sykamore
- Sylvia (born 1956)

== T ==
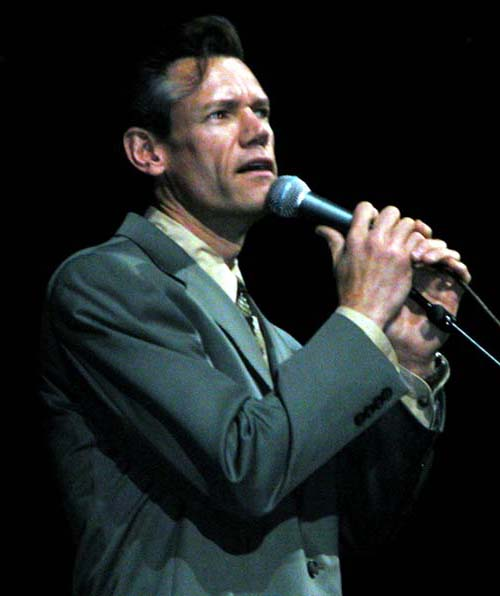
Randy Travis

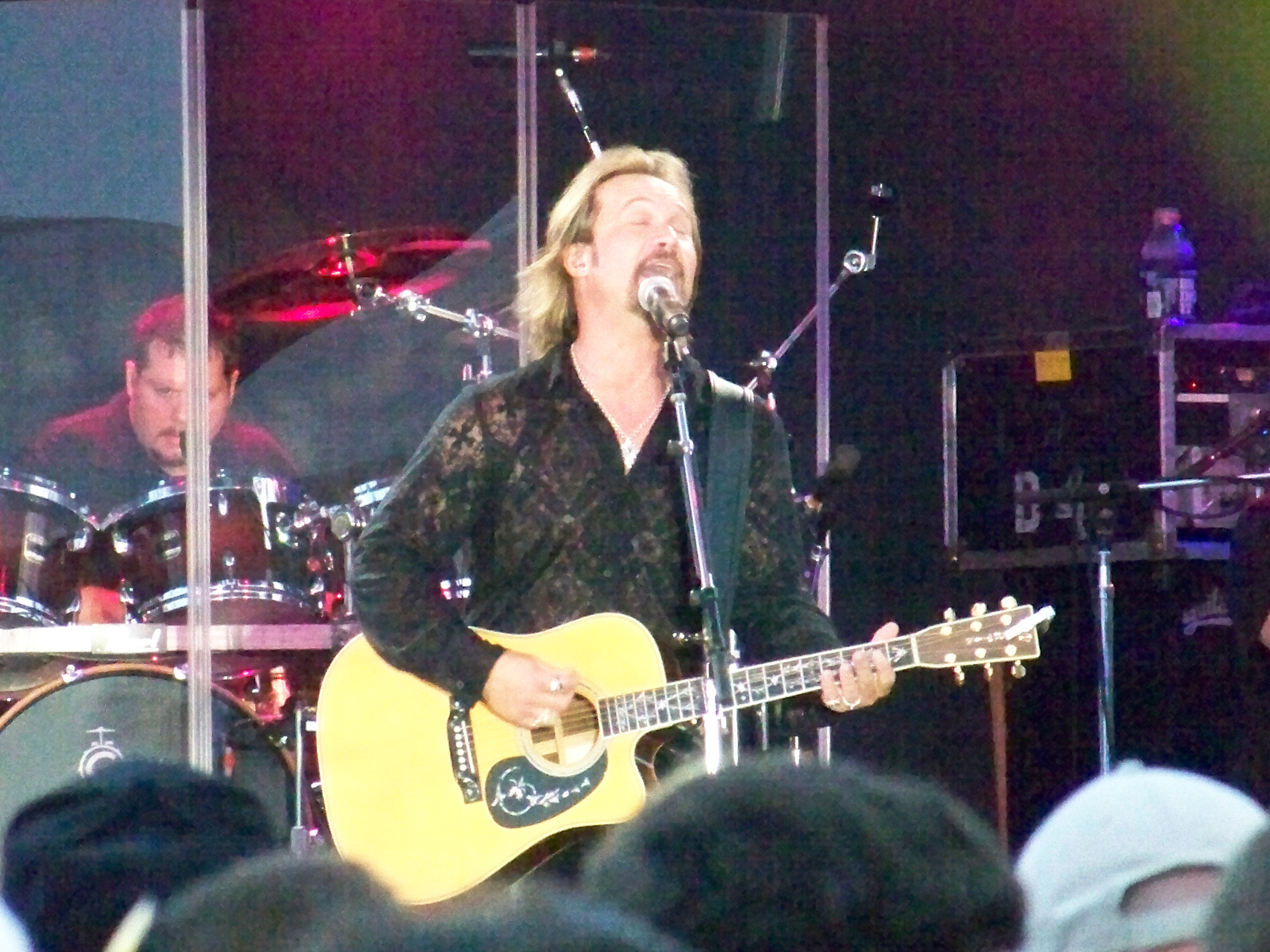
Travis Tritt

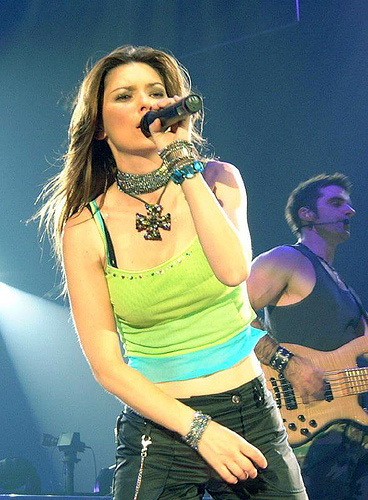
Shania Twain

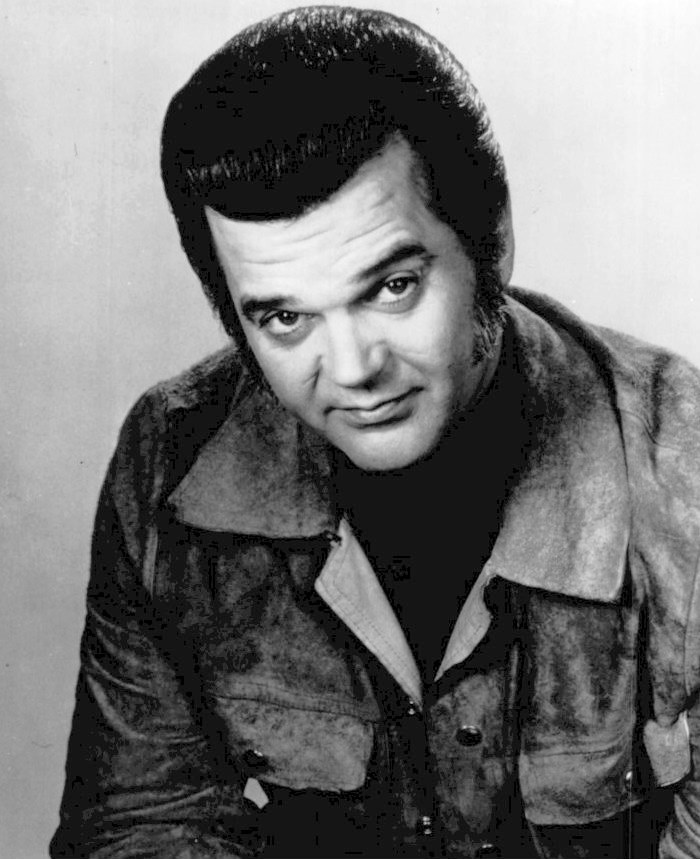
Conway Twitty

- The Tallest Man on Earth (born 1983)
- Barry and Holly Tashian
- Chip Taylor (1940–2026)
- James Taylor (born 1948)
- Les Taylor (born 1948)
- Karen Taylor-Good
- Tebey (born c. 1983)
- Owen Temple
- Glen Templeton
- Tennessee Pulleybone
- Chalee Tennison (born 1969)
- Mitchell Tenpenny (born 1989)
- Tobacco Rd Band
- Texas Tornados
- Chris Thile (born 1981)
- B. J. Thomas (1942–2021)
- Keni Thomas
- Ward Thomas
- The Thompson Brothers Band
- Thompson Square
- Hank Thompson (1925–2007)
- Hayden Thompson
- Josh Thompson (born 1978)
- Sue Thompson
- Cyndi Thomson (born 1976)
- Paul Thorn
- Billy Bob Thornton (born 1955)
- Marsha Thornton (born 1964)
- Those Darlins
- Those Poor Bastards
- A Thousand Horses
- Neil Thrasher (born 1963)
- Thrasher Shiver
- Billy ThunderKloud (1948–2018)
- Jamie Lee Thurston
- Tigirlily Gold
- Mel Tillis (1932–2017)
- Pam Tillis (born 1957)
- Floyd Tillman (1914–2003)
- Johnny Tillotson (1939–2025)
- Justin Timberlake
- The Time Jumpers
- Rick Tippe
- Aaron Tippin (born 1958)
- Tony Toliver
- Chris Tomlin
- Trent Tomlinson (born 1976)
- Tompall & the Glaser Brothers
- Toni Willé (born 1953)
- Zach Top (born 1997)
- Mitchell Torok (born 1927)
- Tenille Townes (born 1994)
- Texas Lightning
- The Texas Tenors
- The Tractors
- Trader-Price
- Trailer Choir
- Trampled by Turtles
- Merle Travis (1917–1983)
- Randy Travis (born 1959)
- Treaty Oak Revival
- Rick Trevino (born 1971)
- Trick Pony
- Trini Triggs
- Tony Trischka
- Travis Tritt (born 1963)
- Truck Stop
- Ernest Tubb (1914–1984)
- Justin Tubb (1935–1998)
- Tanya Tucker (born 1958)
- Dean Tuftin (born 1970)
- Josh Turner (born 1977)
- Lane Turner (born 1967)
- Leah Turner
- Mary Lou Turner (born 1947)
- Tina Turner (1939–2023)
- Turner Nichols
- Turnpike Troubadours
- Molly Tuttle (born 1993)
- Shania Twain (born 1965)
- Jeff Tweedy (born 1967)
- Twister Alley
- Conway Twitty (1933–1993)
- Two Tons of Steel
- Bonnie Tyler (1951-2026)
- Kris Tyler
- Ryan Tyler (born 1973)
- Steven Tyler (born 1948)
- T. Texas Tyler
- Ian Tyson (born 1933)

== U ==
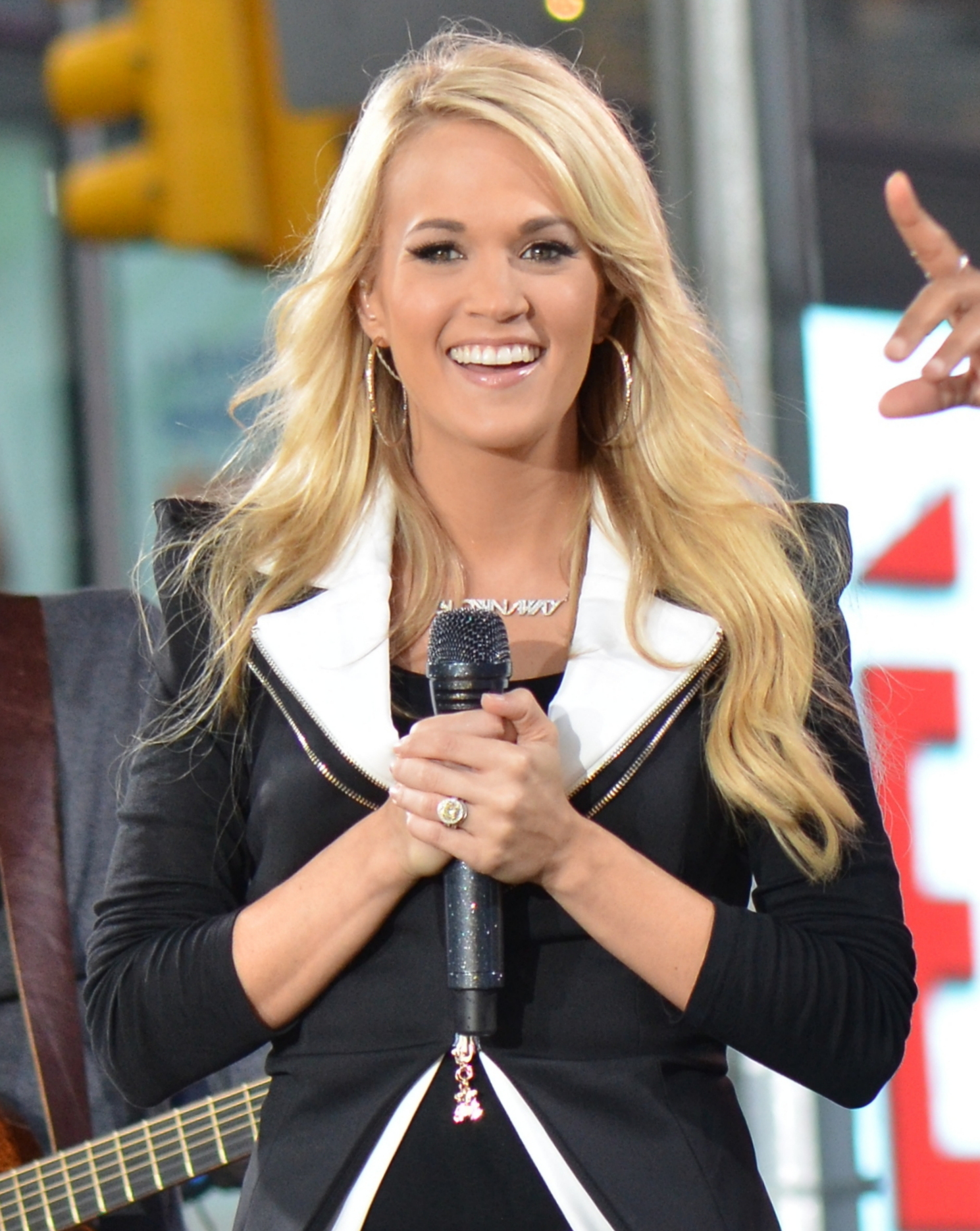
Carrie Underwood

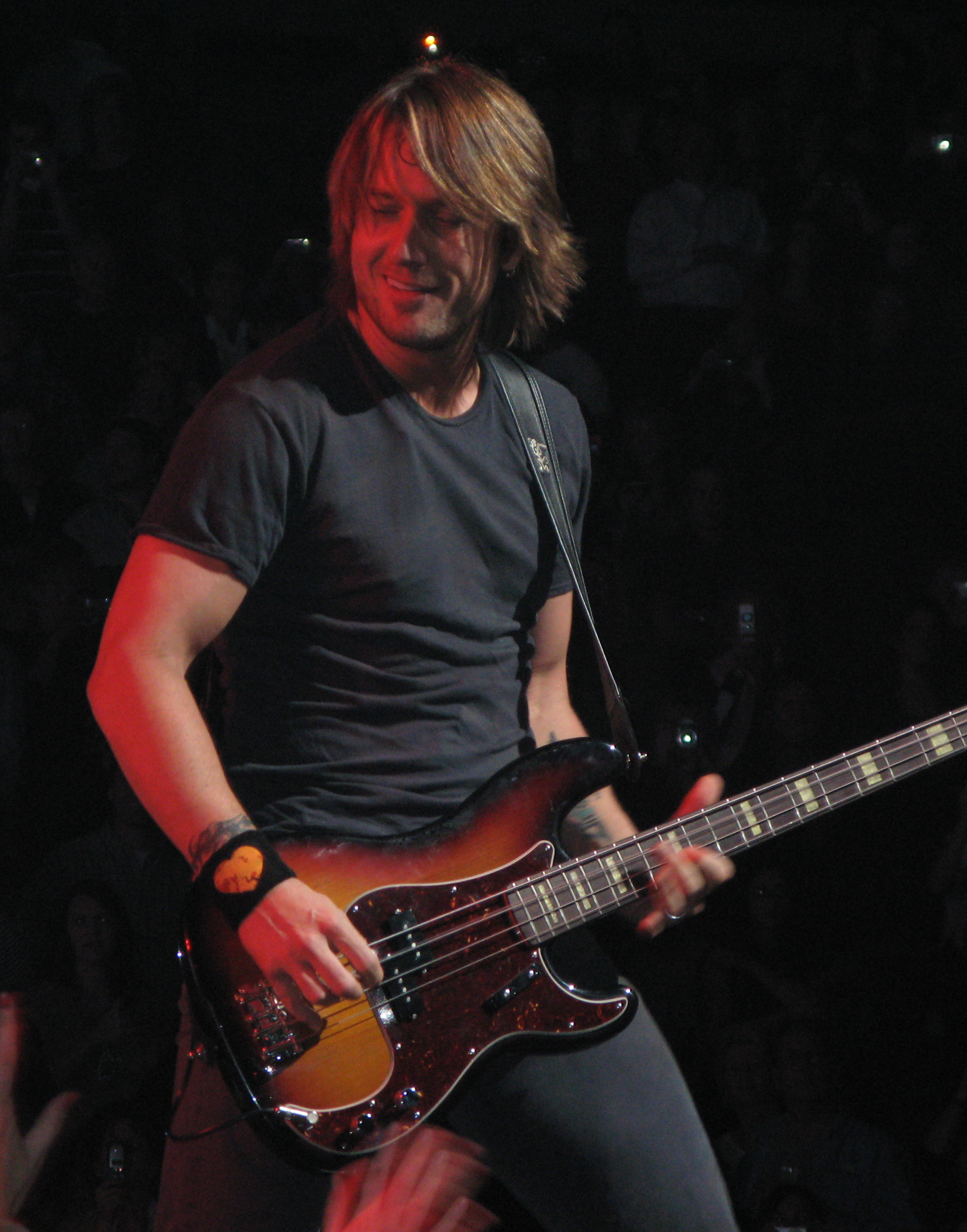
Keith Urban

- U2
- Donna Ulisse
- Uncle Earl
- Uncle Kracker (born 1974)
- Uncle Tupelo
- Carrie Underwood (born 1983)
- Union Station
- Upchurch
- Keith Urban (born 1967)

== V ==
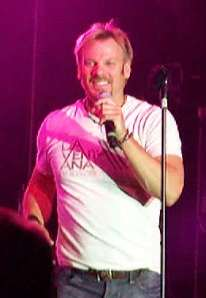
Phil Vassar

- Valdy
- Leroy Van Dyke (born 1929)
- Van Zant
- Jimmie Van Zant (1957–2016)
- Johnny Van Zant (born 1960)
- Townes Van Zandt (1944–1997)
- Chase Varnes
- Cassandra Vasik
- Phil Vassar (born 1962)
- Kenny Vaughan
- J. R. Vautour
- Ray Vega (born 1961)
- Scott Vestal
- Gina Villalobos
- Gene Vincent (1935–1971)
- Rhonda Vincent (born 1962)
- Rick Vincent
- Cole Vosbury

== W ==
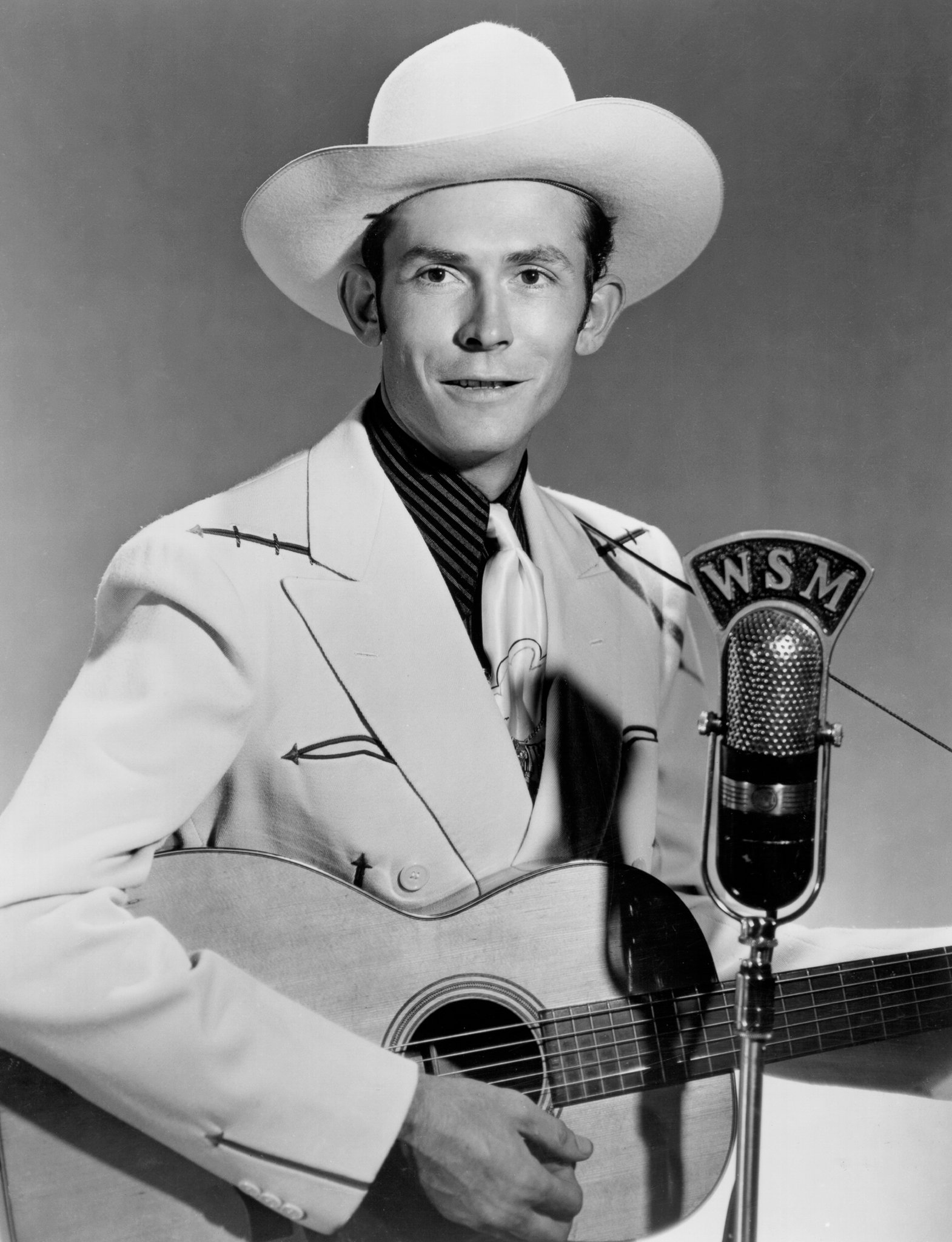
Hank Williams

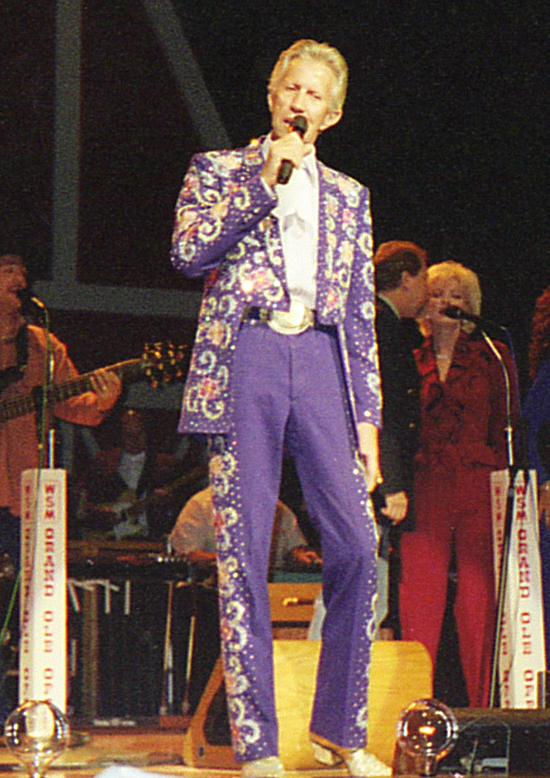
Porter Wagoner

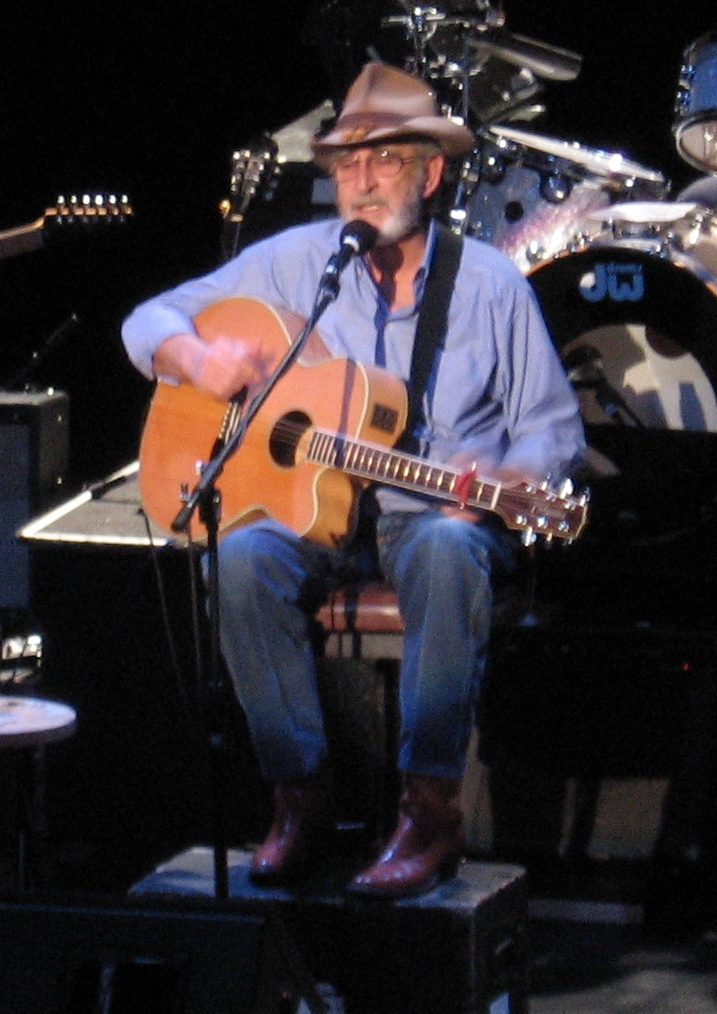
Don Williams

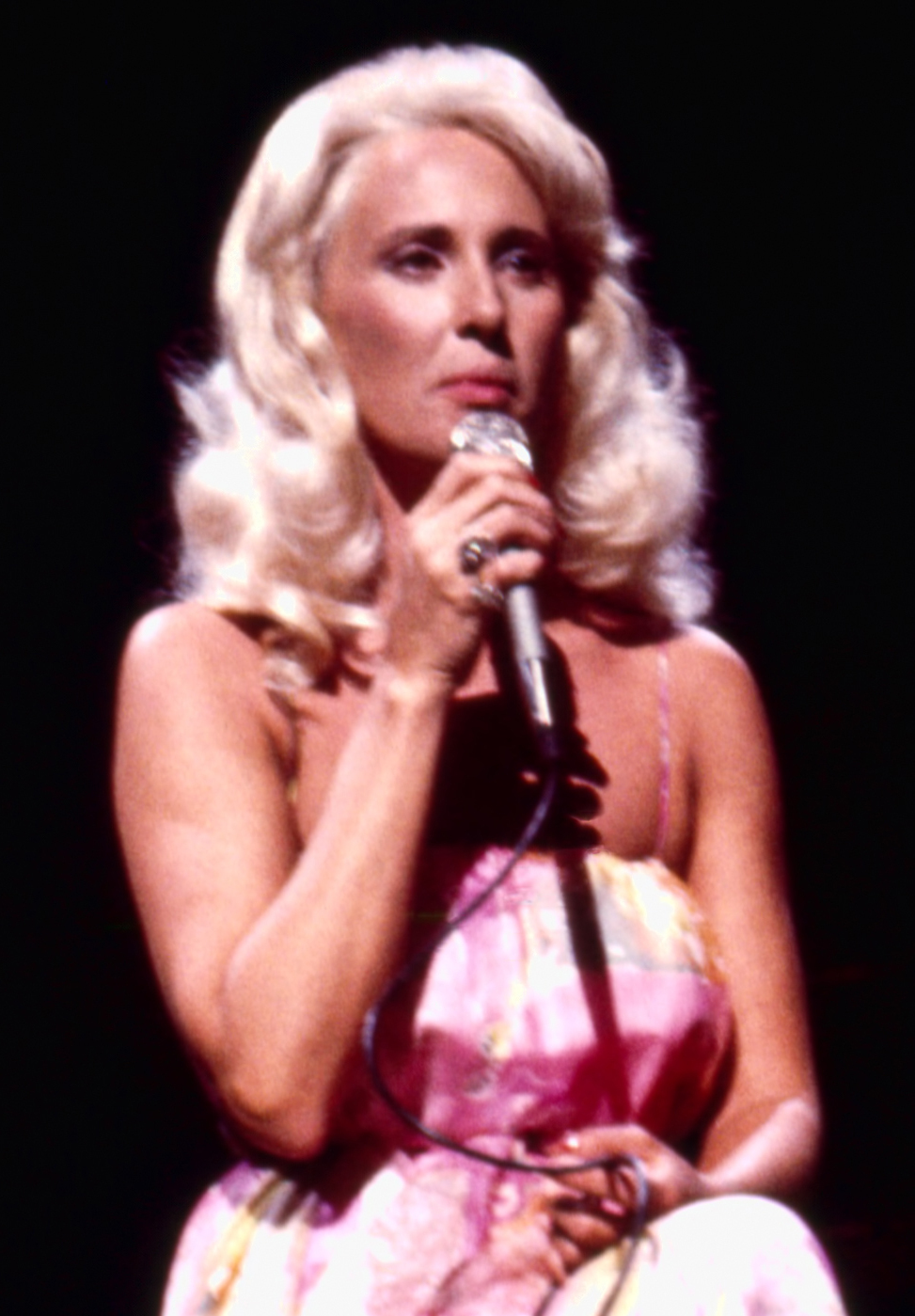
Tammy Wynette

- Morgan Wade (born 1994)
- Roger Alan Wade
- Thomas Wade
- Chuck Wagon & the Wheels
- The Wagoneers
- Porter Wagoner (1927–2007)
- Jimmy Wakely (1914–1982)
- Billy Walker (1929–2006)
- Bradley Walker
- Charlie Walker (1926–2008)
- Cindy Walker (1918–2006)
- Clay Walker (born 1969)
- Jerry Jeff Walker (1942–2020)
- Mike Walker
- Alli Walker
- Tamara Walker
- Wheeler Walker Jr.
- Colter Wall (born 1995)
- Jerry Wallace (1928–2008)
- Ron Wallace
- Morgan Wallen (born 1993)
- Don Walser (1934–2006)
- The War and Treaty
- Chris Ward
- Jacky Ward (born 1946)
- Taylor Ware (born 1994)
- Steve Wariner (born 1954)
- Darren Warren
- Jamie Warren
- The Warren Brothers
- The Washboard Union
- Waterloo Revival
- Sara Watkins (born 1981)
- Sean Watkins (born 1977)
- Aaron Watson (born 1977)
- B. B. Watson (1953–2013)
- Dale Watson (born 1962)
- Doc Watson (1923–2012)
- Gene Watson (born 1943)
- Willie Watson (born 1979)
- Dallas Wayne
- Jimmy Wayne (born 1972)
- Austin Webb
- Jimmy Webb (born 1946)
- Randy Weeks
- Gillian Welch (born 1967)
- Kevin Welch (born 1955)
- Freddy Weller (born 1947)
- Kitty Wells (1919–2012)
- James Wesley (born 1970)
- Dottie West (1932–1991)
- Elbert West (1968–2015)
- Emily West (born 1981)
- Shelly West (born 1958)
- Hudson Westbrook (born 2004)
- Western Flyer
- Tucker Wetmore (born 1999)
- Koe Wetzel (born 1992)
- Billy Edd Wheeler (born 1932)
- Cheryl Wheeler (born 1951)
- Karli Whetstone
- Whiskeytown
- Whiskey Falls
- Whiskey Myers
- Cameron Whitcomb
- Bryan White (born 1974)
- Clarence White
- Drake White (born 1983)
- Jack White
- JJ White
- John Paul White
- Joy Lynn White
- Lari White (1965–2018)
- Michael White
- The White Buffalo
- Jenny Whiteley
- The Whites
- Blake Whiten (born 2004)
- Keith Whitley (1955–1989)
- Slim Whitman (1923–2013)
- Hailey Whitters (born 1989)
- Chuck Wicks (born 1979)
- Calvin Wiggett
- John & Audrey Wiggins
- The Wilburn Brothers
- Wilco
- The Wild Feathers
- Wild Horses
- Wild Rose
- The Wilkinsons
- Amanda Wilkinson (born 1982)
- Slim Willet (1919–1966)
- Don Williams (1939–2017)
- Hank Williams (1923–1953)
- Hank Williams Jr. (born 1949)
- Hank Williams III (born 1972)
- Holly Williams (born 1981)
- Jett Williams (born 1953)
- Leona Williams (born 1943)
- Lucinda Williams (born 1953)
- Robin and Linda Williams
- Sam Williams (born 1997)
- Tex Williams (1917–1985)
- Zach Williams
- Zane Williams
- Williams Riley
- John Williamson (born 1945)
- Hal Willis (1933–2015)
- Kelly Willis (born 1968)
- Trent Willmon (born 1973)
- Larry Willoughby (1947-2021)
- Bob Wills (1905–1975)
- Bobby Wills
- David Wills (born 1951)
- Mark Wills (born 1973)
- The Wilsons
- Gretchen Wilson (born 1973)
- Lainey Wilson (born 1992)
- Larry Jon Wilson (1940–2010)
- Rita Wilson (born 1956)
- Slim Wilson (1910–1990)
- Tim Wilson (1961–2014)
- Stephen Wilson Jr. (born 1979)
- Jesse Winchester (1944–2014)
- Blake Wise
- Mac Wiseman (1925–2019)
- Jim Witter
- Jon Wolfe
- The Wolfe Brothers
- Lee Ann Womack (born 1966)
- Jeff Wood (born 1968)
- Bob Woodruff
- Tom Wopat (born 1951)
- Darryl Worley (born 1964)
- Charlie Worsham (born 1985)
- Danny Worsnop (born 1990)
- Marion Worth (1930–1999)
- The Wrays
- The Wreckers
- Chely Wright (born 1970)
- Curtis Wright (born 1955)
- Michelle Wright (born 1961)
- Ruby Wright (1939–2009)
- Wright Brothers Band
- Wrights, The
- Wyatt
- Tammy Wynette (1942–1998)
- Mark Wystrach (born 1979)

== X ==
- X

== Y ==
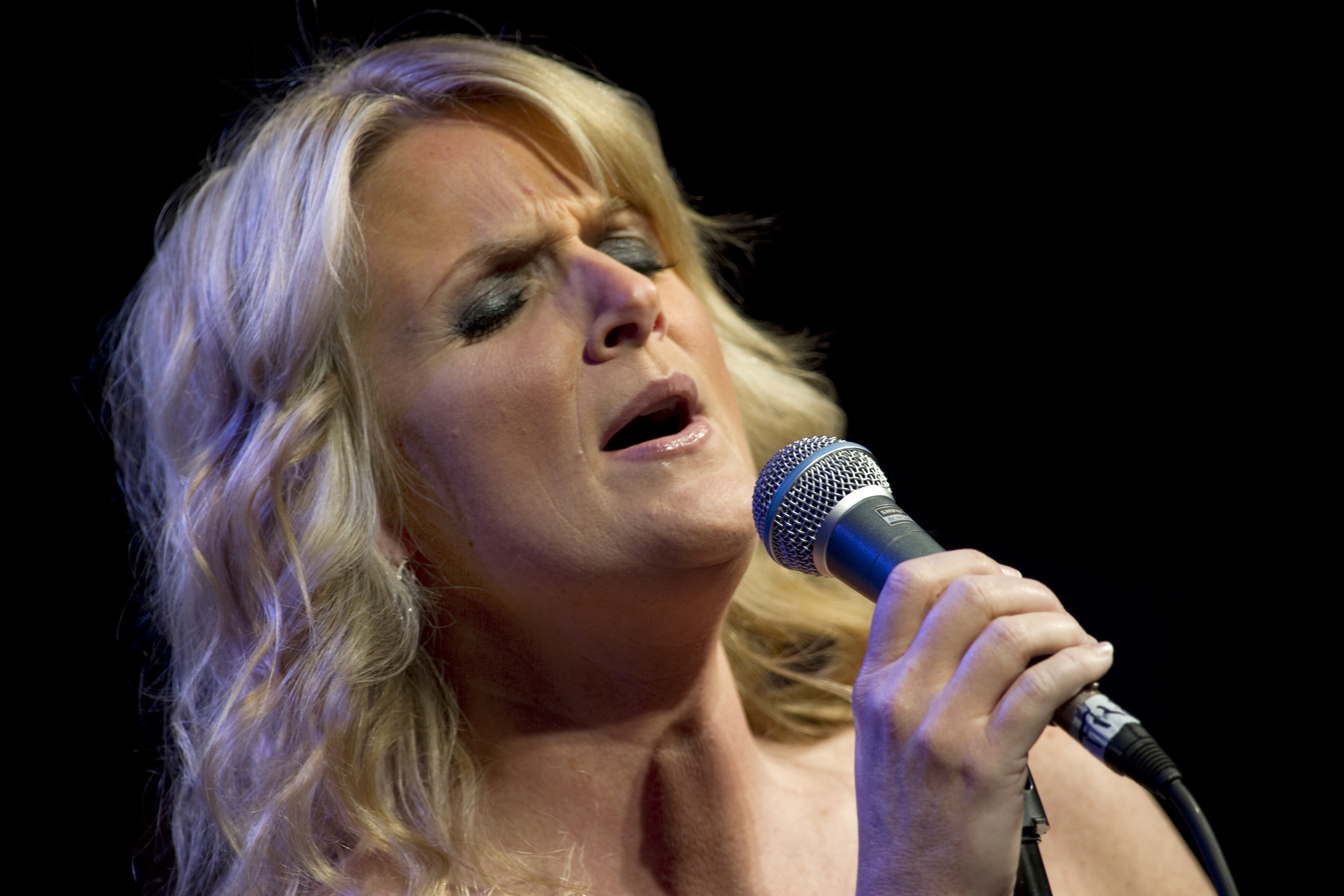
Trisha Yearwood

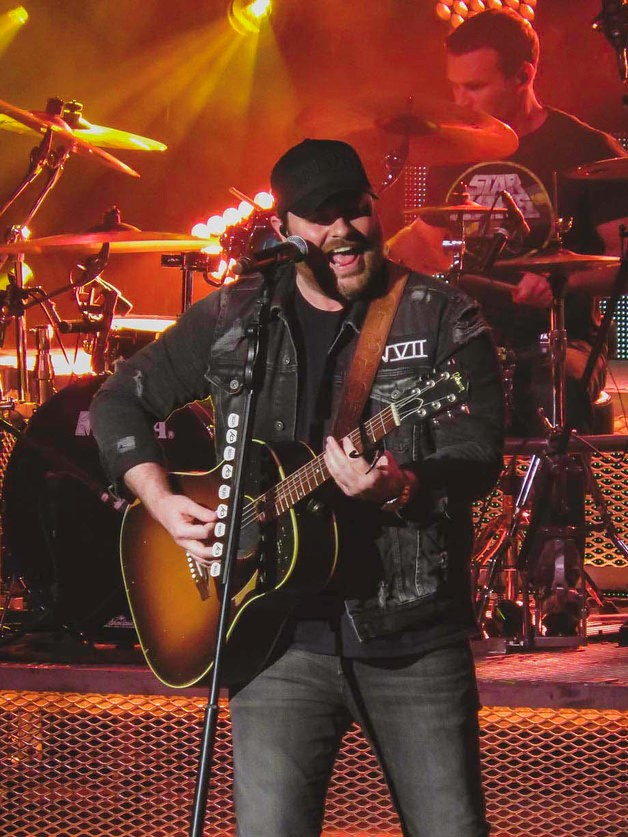
Chris Young

- Yankee Grey
- Billy Yates (born 1963)
- Trisha Yearwood (born 1964)
- Shane Yellowbird (born 1979)
- Dwight Yoakam (born 1956)
- Yola (born 1982)
- Yonder Mountain String Band
- Adrienne Young
- Brett Young (born 1981)
- Chris Young (born 1985)
- Faron Young (1932–1996)
- Steve Young (1942–2016)
- James & Michael Younger

== Z ==
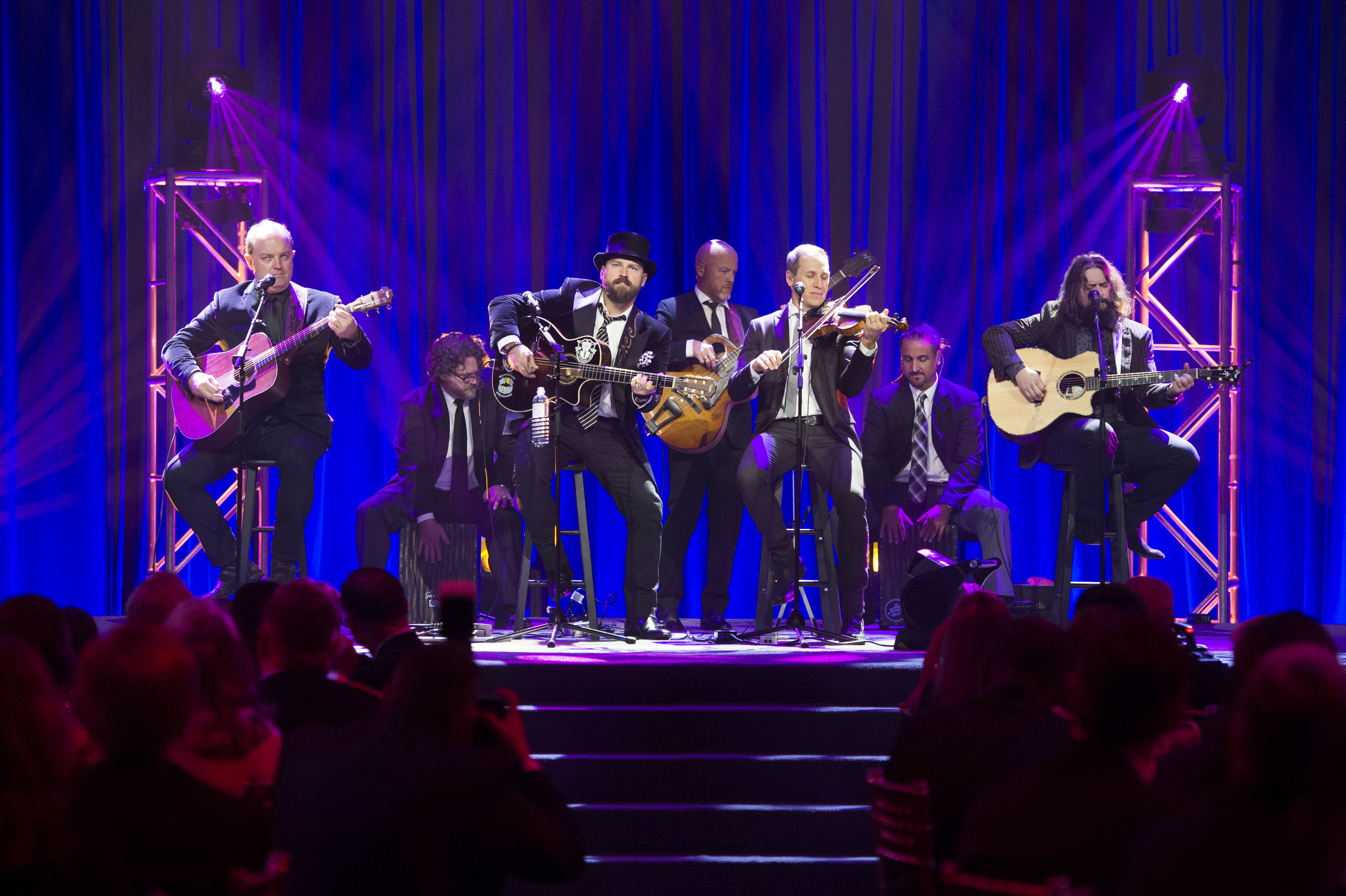
Zac Brown Band

- Zac Brown Band
- Zaca Creek
- Warren Zeiders
- Warren Zevon (1947–2003)
- Bailey Zimmerman (born 2000)
- Billy Zoom
- Mitch Zorn
- Buckwheat Zydeco
