= Capitol Records Nashville =

US record label; sublabel of Capitol Records

- Parent company: Universal Music Group
- Founded: 1950; 76 years ago (Capitol Nashville); 2010; 16 years ago (EMI Nashville)
- Founder: Johnny Mercer; Buddy DeSylva
- Distributor: Music Corporation of America
- Genre: Country; comedy
- Country of origin: United States
- Location: Nashville, Tennessee
- Official website: capitolrecordsnashville.com

Capitol Records Nashville is a major United States–based record label located in Nashville, Tennessee, operating as part of the Music Corporation of America. Its origins go back to 1950 when Capitol Records established its country music office there. From 1991 to 1995, Capitol Nashville was known as Liberty Records. While under the Liberty name, the label operated short-lived sister label Patriot Records from 1994 to 1995. In 1999, EMI launched Virgin Records Nashville but by 2001, Capitol absorbed the short-lived label. In 2010, the label launched sister label EMI Nashville. On March 23, 2011, Alan Jackson signed with Capitol's EMI Nashville division in conjunction with his own ACR Records label.

Capitol Nashville was also home to several successful comedy artists.

== Artists on Capitol Nashville ==
- Dierks Bentley
- Luke Bryan
- Mickey Guyton
- Caylee Hammack
- Hot Country Knights
- Little Big Town
- Anne Murray
- Juice Newton
- Jon Pardi
- Kenny Rogers
- Darius Rucker
- Hootie & the Blowfish
- Tanya Tucker
- Carrie Underwood
- Keith Urban

== Artists on EMI Records Nashville ==
- Brothers Osborne
- Eric Church
- Alan Jackson
- Jon Langston
- Kylie Morgan
- Brad Paisley

== Former artists ==
- Trace Adkins
- Susan Ashton
- Bryan Austin (Patriot)
- The Bama Band
- Kelleigh Bannenr
- Stuart Herring (EMI Nashville)
- Joe Barnhill
- Alan Jackson (EMI Nashville)
- Stephanie Bentley
- John Berry
- Suzy Bogguss
- Lisa Brokop
- Garth Brooks
- Kix Brooks
- T. Graham Brown
- Chris Cagle
- Glen Campbell
- Paulette Carlson
- Rodney Carrington
- Deana Carter
- Cee Cee Chapman (Curb/Capitol)
- Jameson Clark
- Jessi Colter
- Billy "Crash" Craddock
- Kenny Dale
- Lacy J. Dalton
- Linda Davis
- Clay Davidson
- Billy Dean
- The Delevantes
- Amber Dotson
- George Ducas
- Whitney Duncan
- Emilio Navaira
- Ty England
- Skip Ewing
- Cleve Francis
- The Goldens (Capitol/SBK)
- Noah Gordon (Patriot)
- Ricky Lynn Gregg
- Mark Gross
- Merle Haggard
- Adam Hambrick
- Jennifer Hanson
- Joni Harms
- Walker Hayes
- Steven Wayne Horton
- Joey Hyde
- The Jenkins
- Charles Kelley
- Jerry Kilgore (Virgin Nashville)
- Brandon Kinney
- Lady Antebellum
- Chris LeDoux
- Tom Mabe (Virgin Nashville)
- Barbara Mandrell
- Mason Dixon
- Delbert McClinton
- Mindy McCready
- Jennette McCurdy
- Mel McDaniel
- Scott McQuaig
- Dana McVicker
- Roy D. Mercer
- Dean Miller
- Dude Mowrey
- Anne Murray
- Willie Nelson
- Juice Newton
- Nitty Gritty Dirt Band
- Troy Olsen (EMI Nashville)
- Jamie O'Neal
- Marie Osmond (Curb/Capitol)
- Allison Paige
- Palomino Road
- Eric Paslay
- Pearl River
- Pirates of the Mississippi
- Eddie Rabbitt
- The Ranch
- Eddy Raven
- Ashley Ray
- Julie Reeves (Virgin Nashville)
- River Road
- Kenny Rogers
- Roy Rogers
- Linda Ronstadt
- Sawyer Brown (Curb/Capitol)
- Don Schlitz
- Thom Schuyler
- Hillary Scott & the Scott Family
- Shenandoah
- Ryan Shupe & The RubberBand
- Russell Smith
- Jo-El Sonnier
- Verlon Thompson
- Cyndi Thomson
- Trader-Price
- Tanya Tucker
- Steve Wariner
- Emily West
- Dottie West
- Ron White
- Wild Rose
- Cheryl Wheeler
- Lari White
- Tim Wilson
- Jeff Wood
- Curtis Wright
- Billy Yates
- Faron Young
- Dan Seals

== See also ==
- Capitol Music Group
- Capitol Records
- List of Capitol Records artists
- EMI
- Virgin Records
- List of record labels
