= List of Capitol Records artists =

Capitol Records is an American record label owned by Universal Music Group through its Capitol Music Group imprint. It was founded as the first West Coast-based record label "of note" in the United States in 1942 by Johnny Mercer, Buddy DeSylva, and Glenn E. Wallichs.

An asterisk (*) denotes an artist who no longer records for the label.

== # ==
- 2NE1* (YG Entertainment/Capitol)
- 5 Seconds of Summer* (Hi Or Hey/Capitol)

== A ==
- ABBA (US/Canada)
- Adam Ant* (US)
- Salvatore Adamo* (Canada)
- Ryan Adams
- Cannonball Adderley*
- Adéla
- Adeva*
- Aerosmith
- Aespa (SM Entertainment/Capitol) (US)
- Trace Adkins* (Capitol Nashville)
- Alice In Chains*
- Alfamega (T2G Entertainment/Capitol)
- Lily Allen* (US)
- Laurindo Almeida
- Marc Almond* (US)
- Alter Bridge (North America)
- America*
- Anahí
- Patty Andrews*
- The Andrews Sisters*
- April Wine* (outside Canada)
- Ray Anthony*
- Arcadia* (US/Canada)
- Ardn
- Artms (Modhaus/Capitol) (US/UK)
- Ashton, Gardner & Dyke
- Asleep at the Wheel (Capitol Nashville)
- Ateez* (KQ Entertainment/Capitol) (US)
- Auf Der Maur
- Avant
- Avenged Sevenfold*
- Hoyt Axton
- Ado (Japan)

== B ==
- Babyface
- Babymetal
- The Backseat Lovers
- The Bama Band* (Capitol Nashville)
- The Band*
- Joe Barnhill* (Capitol Nashville)
- Syd Barrett* (Harvest/Capitol) (US/Canada)
- Bastille
- Les Baxter, His Orchestra & Chorus
- The Beach Boys (Brother/Capitol)
- Beastie Boys (Grand Royal/Capitol)
- The Beatles* (North America since '60s, worldwide since 2012)
- Beau Dommage* (Canada)
- Gilbert Bécaud (US)
- Beck
- Bee Gees*
- Belinda*
- Belouis Some*
- Jon Bellion
- Ben's Brother
- Dierks Bentley (Capitol Nashville)
- John Berry* (Capitol Nashville)
- BigBang
- Billy Satellite
- Billy Squier
- Blind Melon*
- Birtles & Goble* (licensed from EMI Australia)
- Cilla Black* (US)
- Jeanne Black
- Blondie* (Chrysalis/Capitol)
- Bloodrock*
- Suzy Bogguss* (Capitol Nashville)
- Bone Symphony*
- The Boogie Boys*
- Bran Van 3000*
- Lisa Brokop* (Capitol Nashville)
- Broods
- Garth Brooks* (Liberty/Capitol Nashville)
- Meredith Brooks*
- T. Graham Brown* (Capitol Nashville)
- Luke Bryan (Capitol Nashville)
- Peabo Bryson*
- The Bugaloos*
- Kandi Burruss (Kandi Koated Entertainment/Capitol)
- Butthole Surfers*

== C ==
- Anita Carter
- Chris Cagle* (Capitol Nashville)
- Kimberly Caldwell (Vanguard/Capitol)
- Cali Swag District (Checkmate Music/Capitol)
- Glen Campbell* (Capitol Nashville)
- Mandy Capristo
- Kim Carnes* (EMI America)
- Rodney Carrington (Capitol Nashville)
- Paulette Carlson* (Capitol Nashville)
- Clyde Carson (Moe Doe/Black Wall Street/Capitol)
- Deana Carter* (Capitol Nashville)
- Chad & Jeremy* (US/Canada)
- George Chakiris
- Nels Cline
- Channel Live*
- Cee Cee Chapman* (Curb/Capitol)
- Cherish (Sho'Nuff/Capitol)
- Che'Nelle
- Chingy*
- June Christy (Capitol)
- Eric Church (Capitol Nashville)
- Jameson Clark (Capitol Nashville)
- Robin Clark* (Capitol Nashville)
- Terri Clark (Capitol Nashville)
- Johnny Clegg
- George Clinton*
- Tom Cochrane* (Capitol Canada)
- Joe Cocker*
- Cockney Rebel (Capitol Canada)*
- Cocteau Twins* (US)
- Cold War Kids* (US)
- Coldplay* (US)
- Converge
- Lloyd Cole* (US)
- Nat "King" Cole*
- Jamie Cullum
- Natalie Cole*
- Jessi Colter* (Capitol Nashville)
- Les Compagnons de la chanson (US)
- Canary Conn (as Danny O'Connor)
- The Cover Girls*
- Billy "Crash" Craddock*
- Jimi Cravity (sixstepsrecords/Capitol CMG)
- Jim Croce*
- Crowded House (US)*
- Crowder (sixstepsrecords/Capitol CMG)

== D ==
- Neil Diamond
- Kenny Dale* (Capitol Nashville)
- Lacy J. Dalton* (Capitol Nashville)
- The Dandy Warhols*
- Bobby Darin*
- The Dave Clark Five* (Canada)
- David & Jonathan
- Clay Davidson* (Capitol Nashville)
- Miles Davis* (Capitol Jazz)
- Billy Dean* (Capitol Nashville)
- Dear Jayne
- The Decemberists
- Dem Franchize Boyz
- Depeche Mode* (Virgin/Capitol) (US)
- Divorce
- Duncan Laurence
- Kevin Devine
- Dilated Peoples*
- Dink*
- Dinning Sisters
- Dirty Vegas* (North America)
- Doechii (Top Dawg Entertainment/Capitol)
- Thomas Dolby* (US and Canada)
- Amber Dotson* (Capitol Nashville)
- George Ducas* (Capitol Nashville)
- Annette Ducharme*
- Whitney Duncan* (Capitol Nashville)
- Duran Duran* (US and Canada)

== E ==
- Edward Bear*
- Epik High*
- Empire of the Sun
- Ty England* (Capitol Nashville)
- Faith Evans*
- Everclear*
- Skip Ewing* (Capitol Nashville)
- Enhypen* (Hybe – Belift Lab/Capitol) (US)
- Exodus

== F ==
- Fanny Hamlin*
- Ferras
- Sky Ferreira
- FLETCHER
- Shane Filan (Capitol/Universal UK)
- Tim Finn*
- The Fireman* (Hydra/Capitol) (US/Canada)
- Fischerspooner*
- Fish* (Canada)
- Kay Flock
- FN Meka*
- The Folk Crusaders (Toshiba/Capitol)
- Foo Fighters* (Roswell/Capitol)
- Tennessee Ernie Ford* (Capitol Nashville)
- The Fortunes
- Four Freshmen
- Four Preps
- Cleve Francis* (Capitol Nashville)
- Stan Freberg*
- Doug E. Fresh* (Bust It/Capitol)
- The F-Ups*

== G ==
- Judy Garland*
- Garry Mac and the Mac Truque*
- Lexa Gates
- Larry Gatlin* (Capitol Nashville)
- Crystal Gayle* (Capitol Nashville)
- Gentle Giant* (US and Canada)
- Bobbie Gentry
- Sonny Geraci*
- Gerry and the Pacemakers (Canada)
- Glass Tiger* (Canada)
- Jackie Gleason*
- The Golden Cups (Toshiba EMI/Capitol)
- The Goldens* (Capitol/SBK)
- Good Charlotte
- Grand Funk Railroad*
- Graffiti6*
- Amy Grant (Sparrow/Capitol CMG)
- Great White*
- Andy Griffith*
- Mickey Guyton (Capitol Nashville)

== H ==
- Sammy Hagar
- Hager Twins
- Merle Haggard* (Capitol Nashville)
- Geri Halliwell* (US releases only)
- Halsey*
- Caylee Hammack (Capitol Nashville)
- Jennifer Hanson* (Capitol Nashville)
- Joni Harms* (Capitol Nashville)
- Odessa Harris*
- George Harrison* (Dark Horse/Apple/Capitol) (US)
- Walker Hayes* (Capitol Nashville)
- Heart*
- Niykee Heaton
- Hedley
- Heir Apparent*
- The Heirs (US)
- Helix
- Don Henley
- Terrell Hines
- HRVY
- Milt Herth
- Hey Violet* (Hi or Hey/Capitol)
- Jimi Hendrix* (US)
- J. Holiday (Music Line/Capitol)
- The Hollies* (Canada)
- The Honeys
- Steven Wayne Horton* (Capitol Nashville)
- Jedd Hughes* (Capitol Nashville)
- The Human Beinz
- Hurricane* (Grand Royal/Capitol)
- Hurt

== I ==
- Janis Ian*
- Ice Cube* (Priority/Capitol)
- Ice Spice (10K Projects/Capitol)
- Icon
- If
- Frank Ifield (US/Canada)
- Industry
- Iron Maiden (Harvest/Capitol) (US/Canada)*
- Inner Circle
- The Insect Trust

== J ==
- Jael Wena*
- Alan Jackson (EMI Nashville)
- Freddie Jackson*
- Wanda Jackson*
- Harry James
- Sonny James
- Travis Japan
- Jaicko
- Jane's Addiction*
- Matthew Jay*
- The Jenkins* (Capitol Nashville)
- Jimmy Eat World*
- Eddie Jobson*
- The Jodimars*
- Elton John* (US/Canada)
- Lia Marie Johnson
- Plas Johnson
- Josie & The Pussycats*
- Joy of Cooking

== K ==
- Kali Uchis
- Katrina & the Waves (outside Canada)
- Katy Perry
- Kang Daniel (Konnect Entertainment/Capitol)
- Kay Flock*
- Danny Kaye
- Tori Kelly
- Jesse Kinch
- Carole King
- Kings of Leon
- The Kingston Trio
- The Knack
- Kodak Black
- Dave Koz
- Kraftwerk (US)
- Kudai
- Klaatu (outside Canada)*
- Kep1er (Wake One/Klap/Capitol) (Korean releases only)

== L ==
- Lady A* (Capitol Nashville)
- Pierre Lalonde*
- Duncan Laurence
- LCD Soundsystem
- Chris LeDoux* (Capitol Nashville)
- Peggy Lee*
- John Lennon*
- Sean Lennon* (Grand Royal/Capitol)
- Less Than Jake*
- LeToya* (Capitol)
- The Lettermen
- Lewis Capaldi (US)
- Dua Lipa (Dua Lipa Limited, Warner Music Group)
- Little Big Town (Capitol Nashville)
- Little River Band* (Harvest/Capitol)
- Lil Yachty (Quality Control/Solid Foundation/Capitol/Motown)
- Loren Gray
- Liu Chia-Chang*
- Show Lo
- Laurie London
- Jennifer Lopez* (2101/Capitol)
- Lil Mabu*
- Tito Lopez*
- Donna Loren
- Luscious Jackson* (Grand Royal/Capitol)
- Donna Lynn*

== M ==
- Mabel* (Polydor Records)
- J.D. Martin (Capitol Records Nashville)
- Mad River
- Barbara Mandrell* (Capitol Nashville)
- Gordon MacRae*
- Meredith MacRae
- Mae*
- Magic System
- Mantronix*
- Mandy Capristo
- Marcy Playground*
- Marillion* (US and Canada)
- Martha Tilton (first artist to record on the Capitol label)
- Dean Martin*
- Al Martino*
- Richard Marx*
- Mason Dixon* (Capitol Nashville)
- Conor Maynard* (US)
- Max Webster* (Outside of Canada)
- Maze*
- Kym Mazelle*
- MC Hammer*
- McAuley Schenker Group (MSG) (US)
- Paul McCartney & Wings (primarily US)
- Delbert McClinton*
- Jennette McCurdy (Capitol Nashville)
- Mindy McCready* (Capitol Nashville)
- Mel McDaniel* (Capitol Nashville)
- Kevin McHale* (US/UK/Ireland)
- Sarah McLachlan* (Nettwerk/Capitol) (Canada)
- Scott McQuaig* (Capitol Nashville)
- McQueen Street (SBK/Capitol)
- Megadeth* (Combat/Capitol)
- Mellow Man Ace
- Meovv (The Black Label/Capitol)
- Roy D. Mercer (Capitol Nashville)
- Midnight Red*
- Migos
- Miilkbone*
- Dean Miller* (Capitol Nashville)
- Jody Miller* (Capitol Nashville)
- Mrs. Miller*
- Mrs Mills* (Canada)
- Ned Miller*
- Steve Miller Band* (Worldwide and later US/Canada only)
- Mims* (American King Music/Capitol)
- Liza Minnelli*
- Kylie Minogue* (US/Japan)
- Missing Persons*
- Molly Hatchet*
- Joey Montana
- Melba Moore*
- Patrick Moraz (Cinema/Capitol)*
- Meli'sa Morgan*
- Morningwood*
- Morrissey
- The Motels*
- Dude Mowrey* (Capitol Nashville)
- Anne Murray* (Capitol Canada/Capitol Nashville)
- My Morning Jacket* (ATO/Capitol)

== N ==
- NCT 127 (SM Entertainment/Capitol; co-signed to Caroline Distribution)
- Newsboys* (Capitol CMG)
- Norah Jones (US) (signed to Blue Note)
- Niall Horan (IRE)
- Naughty Boy (US)
- Emilio Navaira* (Capitol Nashville)
- Willie Nelson* (Capitol Nashville)
- Juice Newton* (Capitol Nashville)
- Olivia Newton-John * (US)
- Wayne Newton*
- Britt Nicole (co-signed to Sparrow Records)
- Nate Feuerstein (NF)
- Nine Inch Nails

== O ==
- Oaktown's 357* (Bust It/Capitol)
- OK Go*
- Troy Olsen (EMI Nashville)
- O'Bryan*
- Jamie O'Neal* (Capitol Nashville)
- ONR.
- Donny Osmond* (US/Canada)
- Marie Osmond* (Curb/Capitol Nashville)
- Otep*
- Johnny Otis Show
- The Outsiders*
- Buck Owens* (Capitol Nashville)

== P ==
- Allison Paige* (Capitol Nashville)
- Pallas* (US/Canada)
- John Pardi (Capitol Nashville)
- Passion Conferences (sixstepsrecords/Capitol CMG)
- Les Paul & Mary Ford*
- Liam Payne
- Pearl River* (Liberty/Capitol Nashville)
- People!
- Pet Shop Boys* (US/Canada)
- Katy Perry
- Paul McCartney
- Pentagon (Cube Entertainment/Capitol)
- Peter & Gordon* (US/Canada)
- Liz Phair* (Matador/Capitol)
- Édith Piaf* (US and Canada)
- Pink Floyd* (US/Canada)
- The Pipkins
- The Plasmatics
- Lisa Marie Presley*
- Pirates of the Mississippi* (Capitol Nashville)
- PlaqueBoyMax (Field Trip/Capitol)
- Poison*
- The Power Station* (US and Canada)
- Pru
- PTAF
- Purple Popcorn* (American King/Capitol)
- Robyn Peterson

== Q ==
- Queen* (1984–1989 in the US and Canada)
- Queen Naija
- Queensrÿche (EMI America)
- Quicksilver Messenger Service*

== R ==
- Eddie Rabbitt* (Capitol Nashville)
- Radiohead* (US)
- Corinne Bailey Rae (US)*
- Bonnie Raitt*
- Sue Raney
- Raspberries
- Eddy Raven* (Capitol Nashville)
- Lou Rawls*
- RBD
- Re-Flex*
- Red Café* (Hoo Bangin'/Capitol)
- Helen Reddy*
- Matt Redman (sixstepsrecords/Capitol CMG)
- Red Rider
- Alaina Reed*
- Del Reeves* (Capitol Nashville)
- Relient K (Gotee/Capitol)
- Remy Ma
- Renaissance* (Sovereign/Capitol) (US/Canada)
- Priscilla Renea
- Nacole Rice* (Twenty Two Recordings/Capitol)
- Nelson Riddle & His Orchestra*
- The Righteous Brothers*
- Rigor Mortis
- Tex Ritter*
- River Road* (Capitol Nashville)
- Don Robertson
- Johnny Rodriguez* (Capitol Nashville)
- Kenny Rogers* (Liberty/Capitol Nashville)
- Maggie Rogers* (Liberty/Capitol Nashville)
- Roy Rogers* (Capitol Nashville)
- Linda Ronstadt* (Festival Mushroom/Capitol)
- Rucka Rucka Ali (Pinegrove/Capitol)
- Darius Rucker (Capitol Nashville)
- Pablo Ruiz (EMI-Capitol)
- Runner Runner
- Andy Russell
- Red Hot Chili Peppers
- Royel Otis (Ourness/Capitol)

== S ==
- Kyu Sakamoto
- The Salty Peppers*
- Sam Fender (US)
- Richie Sambora
- Emeli Sandé (US)
- Tommy Sands
- Saosin
- Savuka
- Sawyer Brown* (Curb/Capitol Nashville)
- Don Schlitz* (Capitol Nashville)
- Thom Schuyler* (Capitol Nashville)
- Calum Scott (UK)
- Jack Scott*
- Dan Seals* (Capitol Nashville)
- Seatrain
- Second Coming
- The Seekers*
- Bob Seger*
- Bob Seger & the Silver Bullet Band*
- Bob Seger System*
- Sequal*
- S'Express*
- Helen Shapiro (US and Canada)
- Shenandoah* (Capitol Nashville)
- Sheriff*
- Shiva's Headband
- Ryan Shupe & The RubberBand* (Capitol Nashville)
- Silentó*
- Silverstein
- Frank Sinatra*
- Troye Sivan
- Skinny Puppy* (Nettwerk/Capitol)
- Skylark
- Skyy*
- Slik Toxik
- Slum Village* (Barak/Capitol)
- Hurricane Smith (US)
- Russell Smith* (Capitol Nashville)
- Sam Smith
- Snoop Dogg* (Priority/Capitol)
- Tom Snow
- Jo-El Sonnier* (Capitol Nashville)
- Joe South
- Sparklehorse*
- Spandau Ballet* (US)
- Tracie Spencer*
- Rick Springfield*
- Billy Squier*
- Jo Stafford*
- Kristian Stanfill (sixstepsrecords/Capitol CMG)
- Kay Starr
- Ringo Starr* (US)
- Status Quo* (US)
- Steriogram
- Ray Stevens*
- Harry Stewart
- Rod Stewart
- Skye Sweetnam* (Capitol/EMI Canada)
- Stone Poneys
- Strange Advance* (US and Canada)
- Stryper (Enigma/Capitol)*
- Suave'*
- Yma Sumac*
- Sun*
- Stefanie Sun*
- The Superiors
- SuperM (SM Entertainment/Capitol; co-signed to Caroline Distribution)
- The Sweet* (US)
- The Sylvers*
- Lea Salonga

== T ==
- A Taste of Honey*
- Tavares*
- Télépopmusik* (Catalogue/Capitol)
- Teresa Teng
- These Kids Wear Crowns (Universal)
- Thirty Seconds To Mars (Universal Music)
- Lillo Thomas*
- Lynda Thomas
- Cyndi Thomson* (Capitol Nashville)
- Hank Thompson* (Capitol Nashville)
- Toosii (South Coast Music Group/Capitol)
- Ed Townsend
- Trader-Price* (Capitol Nashville)
- TripleS (Modhaus/Capitol) (US/UK)
- Merle Travis* (Capitol Nashville)
- Charles Trenet (US and Canada)
- Triumvirat
- Jolin Tsai*
- The Tubes*
- Tanya Tucker* (Capitol Nashville)
- Kreesha Turner
- Tina Turner*

== U ==
- Carrie Underwood (Capitol Nashville)
- Keith Urban (Capitol Nashville)

== V ==
- Gene Vincent & His Blue Caps
- The Vines
- Vow Wow
- Valley

== W ==
- Steve Wariner* (Capitol Nashville)
- W.A.S.P
- Gene Watson* (Capitol Nashville)
- Waysted
- Max Webster* (outside Canada)
- Bob Welch*
- Emily West (Capitol Nashville)
- Westside Connection*
- Cheryl Wheeler* (Capitol Nashville)
- The Whispers*
- Ron White (Capitol Nashville)
- Lari White* (Capitol Nashville)
- Jack Wild
- The Wild Ones (Toshiba/Capitol)
- Wild Rose* (Capitol Nashville)
- Kim Wilde* (US)
- Robbie Williams* (US)
- Ann Wilson
- Brian Wilson*
- Nancy Wilson*
- Tim Wilson (Capitol Nashville)
- Curtis Wright* (Liberty/Capitol Nashville)

== X ==
- XYZ*
- XXXTentacion*

== Y ==
- "Weird Al" Yankovic*
- Billy Yates* (Capitol Nashville)
- Yeat
- Yellowcard*
- Faron Young* (Capitol Nashville)
- Don Yute
- Zerobaseone (WakeOne/Capitol) (Korean Releases Only)
- Yungblud (Locomotion/Capitol, from Geffen Records) (Since 2024)
- Yung Fazo
