= List of country performers by era =

Below is a list of notable country performers alphabetically by period, with each listing followed by a description of the artists' work.

== Early innovators ==
- The Carter Family, rural country-folk from Poor Valley, Virginia, known for hits like "Wildwood Flower", recorded the first commercially released country music records under producer Ralph Peer in Bristol, Tennessee. The Carter Family are regarded as the "First Family of Country Music", and founders of country music, along with Jimmie Rodgers.
- Jimmie Rodgers, first solo country superstar, the undisputed "Father of Country Music". Rodgers recorded his first record under Ralph Peer in Bristol, Tennessee the day after the original Carter Family recorded theirs.
- Gene Autry, began recording in the early 1930s before entering the film business and becoming the first Singing Cowboy.
- Vernon Dalhart recorded hundreds of songs until 1931.
- Uncle Dave Macon, banjo player, singer, and songwriter who became the first star of the Grand Ole Opry in the late 1920s
- Roy Acuff Grand Ole Opry star for 50 years, "King of Country Music".
- Jenny Lou Carson, the first female to write a No. 1 Country Hit (1945) "You Two-Timed Me One Time Too Often".
- Patsy Montana, the first female Country singer to sell 1 million records.
- Girls of the Golden West, one of the first Country music duo groups.
- Freddie Hart In 1950 he moved to California and joined Lefty Frizzell's band shortly after when introduced to Capitol Records where Carl Smith recorded "Loose Talk: his very first number one song in 1955.
- Jimmy Heap Popular in the 1950s, considered one of the best exemplars of the post-World War II-era style of honky-tonk music
- Ernest Tubb Beloved Texas troubadour who helped scores become stars.
- Al Dexter, a country musician and songwriter, best known for "Pistol Packin' Mama," a 1944 hit that was one of the most popular recordings of the World War II years.
- Minnie Pearl
- Carl Perkins, pioneer of rockabilly, a fusion of rock and roll and "hillbilly" country music.
- Red Foley, the first major country star after World War II, host of Ozark Jubilee
- Hank Snow Canadian-born Grand Ole Opry star famous for his traveling songs.
- Hank Williams pioneer, singer, and songwriter, known for hits including "I'm So Lonesome I Could Cry", "Your Cheatin' Heart" and "Jambalaya (On the Bayou)".
- Bill Monroe, father of bluegrass music.
- The Davis Sisters, best known for the hit "I Forgot More Than You'll Ever Know"
- Louvin Brothers, inspired the Everly Brothers.
- Little Jimmy Dickens 4-foot 11 inch star of the Grand Ole Opry.
- Goldie Hill, the "golden hillbilly", best known for the hit song "I Let the Stars Get in My Eyes".
- Wilf Carter, the "yodeling" cowboy, aka Montana Slim.
- Jean Shepard, one of Country's leading female vocalists in the 1950s.
- Webb Pierce, classic honky-tonker who dominated '50s country music.
- Kitty Wells, country's first female superstar, called the "Queen of Country Music".
- Johnny Cash created the boom-chicka-boom sound and recorded music from 1954 to 2003.
- Ray Price, created the 4/4 shuffle which transformed traditional country music.
- Glen Campbell, "The Rhinestone Cowboy," legendary session guitarist who launched out as a solo act and broke Country Music's 3-chord barrier and popularized "The Nashville sound" known for lush string and orchestral arrangements.
- Woody Guthrie, wrote and sang the song "This Land is Your Land" and is cited by musicians from many genres as an inspiration.
- Bob Wills was known widely as the King of Western swing
- Carl Smith, whose forceful and energetic voice on his hit singles such as "Loose Talk" and "Hey Joe!" can still be heard in country music today.

== Performers of the Golden Age in the 1960s, 1970s and 1980s ==
- Bill Anderson, singer who is still a major songwriter of new hits
- Liz Anderson, as famous for her songwriting as her singing; mother of Lynn Anderson
- Lynn Anderson, a California blonde who became a major country star in the 70s; helped by regular exposure on national television, was one of the first female artists to achieve major crossover success. Has won CMA, ACM, AMA, & Grammy Awards. Named Billboard's "Artist of the Decade" (70-80).
- Deborah Allen, a popular 80s country vocalist, songwriter. Best known for "Baby I Lied."
- Eddy Arnold, the all-time hit leader by Joel Whitburn's point system
- Hoyt Axton
- Moe Bandy, singer of the 70s/80s; paired with Joe Stampley on a series of recordings
- Bobby Braddock, singer and songwriter who started out as band pianist in 1965 for Marty Robbins. He wrote songs for many early country singers of the 70s, 80s, 90s, and has some albums and singles of his own from 1967 through 1983.
- The Browns, brother-sister trio
- Billy Burnette is an American guitarist, singer, and songwriter who was part of the band Fleetwood Mac from 1987 to 1996 and performed in rock, pop, country, and rockabilly
- Dorsey Burnette was an American early rockabilly singer. He is also the father of country musician and former Fleetwood Mac member Billy Burnette
- Glen Campbell, brought a whole new audience to Country Music with his TV show, co-starred with John Wayne in movie "True Grit," won many awards, top Country Music hitmaker and pop crossover icon. He popularized "The Nashville Sound."
- Bobby Bare is an American outlaw country music singer and songwriter, best known for the songs "Marie Laveau", "Detroit City" and "500 Miles Away From Home" and is the father of Bobby Bare Jr., also a musician.
- Joe Carson, singer started in late 1950s Rockabilly and crossed to country. Died early 1960s.
- June Carter, singer and comedian; star of the Grand Ole Opry; she became the wife and duet partner of Johnny Cash.
- Johnny Cash, one of the single most Influential and popular country singers of all time. Best known for hits like "Ring of Fire", "Folsom Prison Blues" and "Cocaine Blues". He died in 2003
- Tommy Cash was an American country musician, younger brother of Johnny Cash
- Connie Cato, Capitol Records country artist recorded three albums in the 70s. Her hits included "Super Skirt," and the top 20 hit "Hurt." She stopped recording in the very early 80s with her final single "Roses for Sale."
- Patsy Cline, immensely popular balladeer who died in 1963
- Dave & Sugar was an American pop-styled country music trio which enjoyed its peak success in the mid- to late-1970s
- David Allan Coe, Outlaw Country star of the 70s, wrote several outlaw themed songs, released several X-rated albums, which was unheard of in Country Music
- Jessi Colter, Outlaw country singer and wife of Waylon Jennings, best known for "I'm Not Lisa"
- John Conlee, had a string of hits from the late 70s to mid 80s, including his signature "Rose Colored Glasses."
- La Costa is an American country music artist who recorded in the 1970s and 1980s, and is the sister of country singer Tanya Tucker
- Fred Crawford
- Kin Vassy, singer-songwriter, who in addition to his solo recordings also recorded with other artists, most notably Kenny Rogers, Frank Zappa, and Elvis Presley. In 1980, he released two singles for the International Artists (IA) record label. He moved to Liberty Records label and released seven singles on it, including Earl Thomas Conley's "When You Were Blue and I Was Green", which reached number 21 on Hot Country Songs. Vassy continued to work with Kenny Rogers on various projects, such as his 1984 album What About Me. Vassy also composed the song "Kentucky Homemade Christmas" for Rogers, released on Christmas (Liberty Records, 1981).
- Skeeter Davis, major female vocalist for decades
- Mac Davis, country pop hitmaker in the 70s and 80s
- Jimmy Dean, singer and TV personality, former owner of Jimmy Dean Sausage Company
- John Denver, singer/songwriter of numerous hit songs throughout the 1970s including Annies song,Back Home Again, and Take Me Home, Country Roads. John Denver died in 1997.
- Tony Douglas
- Roy Drusky, smooth-singing Opry star for 40 years
- Johnny Duncan was an American country music singer-songwriter, best known for a string of hits in the mid-to-late 1970s.
- Jimmy Martin, The King of bluegrass
- Donna Fargo is an American country singer-songwriter known for a series of hits in the 1970s
- Narvel Felts country music and rockabilly singer known for his soaring tenor and high falsetto.
- Randall Franks Appalachian singer/fiddler on Country Kids TV Series 1983; Grand Ole Opry guest star beginning 1984; crossed over to movies/network television in 1988; tours & scores multi-genre chart recordings into 2020s; inducted in multiple Country Music halls of fame.
- Janie Fricke, known for her series of smooth Countrypolitan hits in the early 80s including "He's A Heartache" and "Don't Worry 'Bout Me Baby."
- Lefty Frizzell, perhaps the greatest of the honky-tonkers
- Crystal Gayle, sister of Loretta Lynn who became a Countrypolitan sensation in the 70s and 80s and had 18 No. 1's during this stretch. Best known for "Don't It Make My Brown Eyes Blue."
- Bobbie Gentry, one of the first female artists to write and produce her own material.
- Don Gibson, wrote and recorded many standards
- Tompall Glaser was an American country singer who was a key figure in the 1970s outlaw country movement
- Bobby Goldsboro
- Jack Greene, nicknamed the Jolly Greene Giant due to his height and deep voice.
- Ray Griff, a Canadian country music singer and songwriter. His songwriting credits reached over 2500 songs, many of which were recorded by Nashville's top recording artists
- Nanci Griffith, had a career that spanned a variety of musical genres, predominantly country, folk, and what she termed "folkability"
- Merle Haggard, popularized the Bakersfield sound along with Buck Owens
- Tom T. Hall, "The Storyteller", wrote most of his many hits
- Emmylou Harris has maintained one of the most artistically rewarding careers in country music
- Hawkshaw Hawkins, Honky-tonk performer from Huntington, WV best known for the songs "Lonesome 7-7203" and "Pan American." He died on March 5, 1963, in a plane crash alongside Patsy Cline and Cowboy Copas.
- Sharon Higgins was the second woman to sign an artist development deal with Sunfire Music. Loretta Lynn was the first. Higgins wrote songs for Loretta Lynn, Norma Jean, Mel Tillis, Jeannie Pruett, and Wynonna Judd. She also recorded her own music as a recording artist signed to Kapp Records and released several singles.
- Doyle Holly was an American musician, who although was known for his solo hit songs, he was best known as the bass guitar player of the country music band Buck Owens and The Buckaroos. His contributions on bass guitar and rhythm guitar were a key component of the Bakersfield sound
- Johnny Horton a country and rockabilly singer who met an untimely death that ended a wonderful career.
- David Houston peaked in popularity between the mid-1960s and the early 1970s. His biggest success came in 1966, when his recording of "Almost Persuaded" topped the Billboard's Hot Country Singles chart for nine weeks
- Jan Howard, pop-flavored female vocalist who sang pure country
- Con Hunley
- Stonewall Jackson, honky-tonk icon
- Sonny James, had a record 16 consecutive No. 1 hits
- Wanda Jackson, honky-tonk female vocalist equally at home in rock and roll
- Waylon Jennings, one of the leaders of the "outlaw" country sound
- George Jones, widely considered "the greatest country singer", No. 1 in charted hits
- Dick Curless, Singer/songwriter known mostly for his trucking songs.
- Kris Kristofferson, songwriter and one of the leaders of the "outlaw" country sound
- k.d. lang, Canadian country-pop singer-songwriter, known for her campy performances, androgynous look, and mezzo-soprano range, winning CCMA's Entertainer of the Year Award in 1987, 1988, 1989, and 1990, Best Album 1988 for Shadowland, and the American Grammy Awards for Best Country Vocal Collaboration 1989 for "Crying" (shared with Roy Orbison), and Best Female Country Music Performance 1990, for Absolute Torch and Twang.
- Jerry Lee Lewis was known for his chart topping country music recordings from the 1960s and 1970s. He was a pioneer of rock and roll and rockabilly music
- Myrna Lorrie, the first Lady of Canadian Country Music.
- Bob Luman was an American country and rockabilly singer
- Judy Lynn was an American country music singer and beauty queen who was crowned Miss Idaho in 1955
- Loretta Lynn, arguably country music's biggest star in the 1960s and early 1970s.
- Barbara Mandrell, first artist to win Country Music Association Entertainer of the Year twice (1980, 1981). Known for highly polished live concerts. Had the last successful prime-time network variety show on NBC 1980–1982. Charted over 50 country hits from the early 1970s thru the late 1980s. Could sing, dance and play over 10+ instruments.
- Mac McAnally
- Pake McEntire
- Eddie Middleton
- Jody Miller was an American singer who had commercial success in the genres of country, folk, and pop. She was the second female artist to win a country music accolade from the Grammy Awards, which came off the success of her 1965 song "Queen of the House." By blending multiple genres together, Miller's music was considered influential for other music artists
- Roger Miller, songwriter and Grammy record-breaker
- Ronnie Milsap, country's first blind superstar and arguably the most popular country star of the late 1970s and early 1980s; scored 40 No. 1 hits (35 of which reached the top spot on Billboard)
- Melba Montgomery, duet vocalist in the 60s, who launched a solo career in the 70s
- Anne Murray, Prominent Canadian country-pop vocalist best known for the songs "Snowbird," "Could I Have This Dance," "You Needed Me," and others in the 1970s-1980s.
- Willie Nelson, songwriter and one of the leaders of the outlaw country sound
- Mickey Newbury, singer/songwriter started the lyric revolution in Nashville with his 1969 album Looks Like Rain. He wrote over 500 songs and has over 1000 covers to date. He was a songwriter's songwriter.
- Marie Osmond, Youngest female to date to have a No. 1 country hit, with "Paper Roses" in 1973, and also had a string of country hits in the mid-1980s such as;"Meet Me in Montana" (with Dan Seals), "There's No Stopping Your Heart", "Read My Lips", "You're Still New To Me" (with Paul Davis), and "I Only Wanted You".
- Norma Jean, gifted "hard country" vocalist, known also as Pretty Miss Norma Jean
- Buck Owens, Hottest artist of the '60s, pioneer innovator of the Bakersfield sound
- Gram Parsons, Parsons joined [the Byrds] in early 1968 after leaving his pioneering International Submarine Band, the Byrds recorded the seminal country rock album, Sweetheart of the Rodeo
- Dolly Parton, one of the most successful female country artists in history. Country and pop music star, actress (most notably "9 to 5" and "Steel Magnolias"), songwriter. Best known for "I Will Always Love You," which she took to #1 on the country charts in 1974 and 1982; also covered by Whitney Houston for "The Bodyguard" soundtrack.
- Ray Price, traditional country star of the '50s and '60s, who experienced pop success in the '70s and '80s
- Charley Pride, the first black country music star in the 1970s and early 1980s. Best known for "Kiss An Angel Good Mornin'."
- Jeanne Pruett, female vocalist of the 70s, best known for the song "Satin Sheets"
- Bonnie Raitt, an American blues singer-songwriter and a renowned slide guitar player
- Susan Raye, Buck Owens' protégée who became a solo star with moderate success
- Jim Reeves, crossover artist, invented Nashville Sound with Chet Atkins.
- Jack Reno
- Bobby G. Rice is an American country music singer-songwriter who released nine albums and charted thirty songs between 1970 and 1988
- Charlie Rich, '50s rock star who enjoyed greatest success in '70s country.
- Marty Robbins, one of the most popular artists in country music history. Named artist of the decade (1960–1969) by the Academy of Country Music
- Jeannie C. Riley, "socked it to" the pop charts with "Harper Valley PTA."
- Kenny Rogers, unique-voiced storyteller who also recorded love ballads and more rock material. He defined what was known as country crossover and became one of the biggest artists in country and any music genre.
- Billy Joe Royal
- John Wesley Ryles recorded a string of hit country songs, beginning in 1968 and continuing through the 1980s
- Jeannie Seely, known as "Miss Country Soul"
- Ronnie Sessions
- Billy Joe Shaver, songwriter, wrote all but one song on Waylon Jennings' groundbreaking Honky Tonk Heroes album
- Connie Smith, recorded "Once a Day," the longest stay at No. 1 for any female country artist.
- Margo Smith, known for her sexy pop country in the 80s. She transitioned to Christian country in the 90s.
- Sammi Smith, best known for her "husky" voice and 1971 hit song "Help Me Make It Through the Night."
- Jo-El Sonnier
- Joe South
- Sylvia, Countrypolitan sensation the early to mid-80s. Best known for pop-crossover hit "Nobody."
- Billie Jo Spears, a hard-country vocalist with primarily international popularity
- Ray Stevens, comedy crossover artist, Branson businessman
- Johnny Stills & The Country Gentlemen
- Mel Tillis, country music legend and father of country singer Pam Tillis.
- Tanya Tucker, teen Country star whose career later spanned well beyond her teen years, from the mid-1970s to the late 1990s.
- Conway Twitty, started in the 1950s as a rocker but started the country scene in the 1960s. A voice that scored 55 No. 1 hits (Had the most all time until 2006, when George Strait broke the record), released several songs in the 1970s and '80s that were controversial for the time, ("You've Never Been This Far Before", "I'd Love to Lay You Down", "Linda on My Mind")
- Townes Van Zandt, songwriter, troubador
- Bobby Vinton
- Porter Wagoner, pioneer on country television
- Charlie Walker
- Gene Watson, Texas country music cult legend, who gained national success after "Love in the Hot Afternoon"
- Freddy Weller is an American rock and roll and country music singer. He had his highest charted single in 1969 with his debut release of "Games People Play"
- Dottie West, one of country music's most influential and groundbreaking female artists
- The Wilburn Brothers, popular male duet for decades
- Little David Wilkins is an American country music singer, songwriter, and pianist who released his greatest number of chart hits between 1969 and 1977
- Don Williams, aka "The Gentle Giant" with many popular hits
- Hank Williams Jr., Leader in the Outlaw country movement. Multi-instrumental talent, and song writing star. Won several awards. Son of Hank Williams Sr.
- Andra Willis
- David Wills
- Tammy Wynette, three-time CMA top female vocalist
- Faron Young, a country chart topper for three decades
- Ferlin Husky, country music singer who was equally adept at the genres of traditional honky honk, ballads, spoken recitations, and rockabilly pop tunes
- Hank Locklin, early honky-tonk singer-songwriter who had hits that charted from 1949 to 1971
- Billy "Crash" Craddock, country rockabilly singer who first gained popularity in Australia in the 1950s with a string of rockabilly hits, including the Australian number one hits "Boom Boom Baby" and "One Last Kiss" and switched to country music, gaining popularity in the United States in the 1970s with a string of top ten country hits, several of which were number one hits. Craddock is known to his fans as "The King Of Country Rock Music" and "Mr. Country Rock" for his uptempo rock-influenced style of country music.
- Stella Parton widely known for a series of country singles that charted during the mid-to-late 1970s. She is the younger sister of the country music entertainer Dolly Parton and the older sister of the singer Randy Parton and actress Rachel Dennison
- Randy Parton was an American singer-songwriter, actor and businessman. He was the younger brother of Dolly Parton and Stella Parton and the older brother of actress Rachel Dennison. Parton was the first person to record the song "Roll On (Eighteen Wheeler)" in 1982. Two years later, Alabama recorded it, and became the group's 12th straight number 1 single. Also in 1984, Parton sang a song for the Rhinestone soundtrack, his sister Dolly starred in the film. He also played bass for his sister.
- Johnny Rodriguez is an American country music singer. He is a Tejano and Texas country music singer, infusing his music with Latin sounds, and even singing verses of songs in Spanish. In the 1970s and 1980s, he was one of country music's most successful male artists, recording a string of hit songs, such as "You Always Come Back to Hurting Me," "Desperado," "Down on the Rio Grande" and "Foolin'." He has recorded six number 1 country hits in his career.
- Becky Hobbs

== Country rock performers ==
- The Allman Brothers Band, the most successful southern rock band in history
- The Band, started out backing up Bob Dylan and their Music from Big Pink is a classic record
- Black Oak Arkansas
- Blackberry Smoke
- Blackfoot
- Jimmy Buffett
- The Byrds
- Glen Campbell
- Charlie Daniels Band
- Gene Clark
- Commander Cody and His Lost Planet Airmen
- Desert Rose Band
- Eric Church
- The Everly Brothers, predated others in this category but important figures in the transition from rockabilly to country rock
- The First Edition
- Flying Burrito Brothers
- Kinky Friedman
- Emmylou Harris
- Heartsfield
- KANE
- The Kentucky Headhunters
- Chris LeDoux
- Marshall Tucker Band
- Ricky Nelson, in the latter stage of his career, particularly on songs such as "Garden Party"
- Michael Nesmith
- New Riders of the Purple Sage
- Juice Newton, the top-selling female country rocker of the 1980s
- Nitty Gritty Dirt Band
- Ozark Mountain Daredevils
- Gram Parsons, a pioneer of the country rock and alt-country sound. A member of the International Submarine Band, The Byrds, and The Flying Burrito Brothers.
- Poco
- Pure Prairie League (Vince Gill was the lead singer of this group on their biggest pop hit, 1980s "Let Me Love You Tonight.")
- John Rich
- Linda Ronstadt, in 1978 Country Music Magazine put her on the cover with the title "Queen Of Country Rock".
- Southern Pacific (band)
- Gary Stewart honky tonker and southern rocker, legendary throughout the '70s and early '80s.
- Steve Young
- Sasha Pieterse
- Billy "Crash" Craddock, country rockabilly singer who first gained popularity in Australia in the 1950s with a string of rockabilly hits, including the Australian number one hits "Boom Boom Baby" and "One Last Kiss" and switched to country music, gaining popularity in the United States in the 1970s with a string of top ten country hits, several of which were number one hits. Craddock is known to his fans as "The King Of Country Rock Music" and "Mr. Country Rock" for his uptempo rock-influenced style of country music.

== Early 1980s country-music performers ==
- Alabama
- Deborah Allen
- John Anderson
- Asleep at the Wheel
- Johnny Cash
- June Carter Cash
- Rosanne Cash
- David Allan Coe
- John Conlee
- Earl Thomas Conley
- Rodney Crowell
- Charlie Daniels
- Leon Everette
- Exile
- Randall Franks
- Janie Fricke
- Larry Gatlin
- Crystal Gayle
- Terri Gibbs
- Mickey Gilley
- Vern Gosdin
- Lee Greenwood
- Merle Haggard
- Emmylou Harris
- Freddie Hart
- Becky Hobbs
- Waylon Jennings
- George Jones
- The Judds
- Chris LeDoux
- Johnny Lee
- Patty Loveless
- Loretta Lynn
- Barbara Mandrell
- Irlene Mandrell
- Louise Mandrell
- Kathy Mattea
- Mac McAnally
- Charly McClain
- Mel McDaniel
- Reba McEntire
- Ronnie Milsap
- Gary Morris
- Anne Murray
- Willie Nelson
- Juice Newton
- Oak Ridge Boys
- Marie Osmond
- Dolly Parton
- Charley Pride
- Eddie Rabbitt
- Eddy Raven
- Restless Heart
- Richard Lynch
- Jerry Reed
- Jason Ringenberg
- Kenny Rogers
- John Schneider
- T.G. Sheppard
- Ricky Skaggs
- Jo-El Sonnier
- The Statler Brothers
- George Strait
- Sylvia
- Conway Twitty
- Steve Wariner
- Dottie West
- The Whites
- Don Williams
- Hank Williams Jr.
- David Wills
- Tammy Wynette
- Boxcar Willie

== Late-1980s country-music performers ==
- Alabama
- Deborah Allen
- John Anderson
- Asleep at the Wheel
- Baillie & the Boys
- Clint Black
- T. Graham Brown
- Doug Stone
- Larry Boone
- Garth Brooks
- Sawyer Brown
- Carlene Carter
- Lionel Cartwright
- Johnny Cash
- June Carter Cash
- Rosanne Cash
- Jeff Chance
- David Allan Coe
- John Conlee
- Earl Thomas Conley
- Rodney Crowell
- Charlie Daniels
- Holly Dunn
- Skip Ewing
- The Forester Sisters
- Randall Franks
- Terri Gibbs
- Vince Gill
- Mickey Gilley
- Vern Gosdin
- Merle Haggard
- Highway 101
- Becky Hobbs
- Alan Jackson
- Waylon Jennings
- Chris LeDoux
- Robin Lee
- Patty Loveless
- Lyle Lovett
- Loretta Lynn
- Barbara Mandrell
- Kathy Mattea
- Mac McAnally
- Mel McDaniel
- Ronnie McDowell
- Reba McEntire
- Scott McQuaig
- Ronnie Milsap
- Gary Morris
- Willie Nelson
- K.T. Oslin
- Dolly Parton
- Eddie Rabbitt
- Eddy Raven
- Restless Heart
- Jason Ringenberg
- Dennis Robbins
- Judy Rodman
- Kenny Rogers
- Blue Rodeo
- Billy Joe Royal
- John Schneider
- Dan Seals
- Ricky Van Shelton
- T.G. Sheppard
- Ricky Skaggs
- Jo-El Sonnier
- The Marcy Brothers
- The Statler Brothers
- George Strait
- The McCarters
- Randy Travis
- Tanya Tucker
- Conway Twitty
- Keith Whitley
- Don Williams
- Hank Williams Jr.
- Tammy Wynette
- Dwight Yoakam
- Sons of the Desert (band)

== Early-1990s country-music performers ==
- 4 Runner
- Alabama
- Archer/Park
- The Buffalo Club
- Deborah Allen
- John Anderson
- Susan Ashton
- Baillie & the Boys
- Clint Black
- Roger Ballard
- BlackHawk
- Suzy Bogguss
- Larry Boone
- Brooks & Dunn
- Sawyer Brown
- Garth Brooks
- Restless Heart
- Little Texas
- Blue Rodeo
- Boy Howdy
- Tracy Byrd
- Mary Chapin Carpenter
- Paulette Carlson
- Carlene Carter
- Lionel Cartwright
- Johnny Cash
- June Carter Cash
- Rosanne Cash
- Jeff Chance
- Kenny Chesney
- Mark Chesnutt
- Terri Clark
- Mark Collie
- Amie Comeaux
- Earl Thomas Conley
- Rob Crosby
- Rodney Crowell
- Bobbie Cryner
- Heather Myles
- Billy Ray Cyrus
- Charlie Daniels
- Linda Davis
- Billy Dean
- Diamond Rio
- Joe Diffie
- Dixiana
- George Ducas
- Skip Ewing
- Radney Foster
- Randall Franks
- Gibson/Miller Band
- Vince Gill
- Noah Gordon
- Lee Greenwood
- Ricky Lynn Gregg
- Clinton Gregory
- Joni Harms
- Faith Hill
- Merle Haggard
- Highway 101
- Becky Hobbs
- John Hogan
- Jesse Hunter
- Alan Jackson
- Waylon Jennings
- George Jones
- Wynonna Judd
- Toby Keith
- David Kersh
- Sammy Kershaw
- Hal Ketchum
- Jeff Knight
- Alison Krauss
- Tracy Lawrence
- Chris LeDoux
- Robin Lee
- Eddie London
- Patty Loveless
- Lyle Lovett
- Kathy Mattea
- Matthews, Wright & King
- Mac McAnally
- Martina McBride
- McBride and the Ride
- Neal McCoy
- Reba McEntire
- Tim McGraw
- Ronnie Milsap
- John Michael Montgomery
- Lorrie Morgan
- Dude Mowrey
- David Lee Murphy
- Willie Nelson
- K.T. Oslin
- Lee Roy Parnell
- Dolly Parton
- Pearl River
- Perfect Stranger
- Pirates of the Mississippi
- Eddie Rabbitt
- Collin Raye
- Ronna Reeves
- Jason Ringenberg
- Dennis Robbins
- Kenny Rogers
- Billy Joe Royal
- Tim Ryan
- Dawn Sears
- Ricky Van Shelton
- Shenandoah
- Ricky Skaggs
- Jo-El Sonnier
- Sons of the Desert (band)
- Les Taylor
- The Bellamy Brothers
- The Kentucky Headhunters
- The Marcy Brothers
- The McCarters
- The Oak Ridge Boys
- The Statler Brothers
- Doug Stone
- George Strait
- Marty Stuart
- Doug Supernaw
- Sweethearts of the Rodeo
- The Mavericks
- Pam Tillis
- Rick Tippe
- Aaron Tippin
- Randy Travis
- Rick Trevino
- Travis Tritt
- Tanya Tucker
- Shania Twain
- Conway Twitty
- Donna Ulisse
- Clay Walker
- Steve Wariner
- Western Flyer
- B. B. Watson
- Lari White
- Michael White
- Keith Whitley
- John & Audrey Wiggins
- Hank Williams, Jr.
- Kelly Willis
- Tammy Wynette
- Trisha Yearwood
- Dwight Yoakam

== Late-1990s country-music performers ==
- Trace Adkins
- Rhett Akins
- Alabama
- Deborah Allen
- Gary Allan
- John Anderson
- Jessica Andrews
- Susan Ashton
- Asleep at the Wheel
- David Ball
- John Berry
- Clint Black
- Blackhawk
- Blue Rodeo
- James Bonamy
- Brooks & Dunn
- Garth Brooks
- Tracy Byrd
- Mary Chapin Carpenter
- Deana Carter
- Johnny Cash
- June Carter Cash
- Rosanne Cash
- Kenny Chesney
- Mark Chesnutt
- Terri Clark
- Confederate Railroad
- Rob Crosby
- Billy Ray Cyrus
- Davis Daniel
- Clint Daniels
- Billy Dean
- Wesley Dennis
- Diamond Rio
- Joe Diffie
- Dixie Chicks
- George Ducas
- Ty England
- Sara Evans
- Skip Ewing
- Randall Franks
- Vince Gill
- Ricky Lynn Gregg
- Clinton Gregory
- Andy Griggs
- Merle Haggard
- Keith Harling
- Joni Harms
- Wade Hayes
- Ty Herndon
- Faith Hill
- Monty Holmes
- James T. Horn
- Alan Jackson
- Waylon Jennings
- Johner Brothers
- George Jones
- Toby Keith
- Sammy Kershaw
- Alison Krauss
- Tracy Lawrence
- Chris LeDoux
- Little Texas
- Lonestar
- Patty Loveless
- Lyle Lovett
- Kathy Mattea
- Mac McAnally
- Martina McBride
- Neal McCoy
- Lila McCann
- Mindy McCready
- Reba McEntire
- Tim McGraw
- Jo Dee Messina
- John Michael Montgomery
- Willie Nelson
- Brad Paisley
- Dolly Parton
- Michael Peterson
- Eddie Rabbitt
- Collin Raye
- Ricochet
- LeAnn Rimes
- Jason Ringenberg
- Dennis Robbins
- Kenny Rogers
- Tim Ryan
- Sawyer Brown
- Dawn Sears
- Kevin Sharp
- SHeDAISY
- Shenandoah
- Daryle Singletary
- Jo-El Sonnier
- George Strait
- Doug Supernaw
- Pam Tillis
- Rick Tippe
- Aaron Tippin
- The Mavericks
- The Tractors
- Randy Travis
- Rick Trevino
- Travis Tritt
- Shania Twain
- Keith Urban
- Rhonda Vincent
- Clay Walker
- Bryan White
- Lari White
- John & Audrey Wiggins
- Hank Williams Jr.
- Lee Ann Womack
- Chely Wright
- Tammy Wynette
- Trisha Yearwood
- The Kentucky Headhunters
- The Oak Ridge Boys
- The Bellamy Brothers

== 2000–2009 country-music performers ==
- 3 of Hearts
- Trace Adkins
- Alabama
- Jason Aldean
- Gary Allan
- Rodney Atkins
- Keith Anderson
- Sherrie Austin
- David Ball
- The Band Perry
- Jeff Bates
- Dierks Bentley
- Big & Rich
- Ryan Bingham
- Clint Black
- Blackberry Smoke
- Bomshel
- Paul Brandt
- Lee Brice
- Chad Brock
- Dean Brody
- Brooks & Dunn
- Garth Brooks
- Luke Bryan
- Laura Bell Bundy
- Sarah Buxton
- Tracy Byrd
- Chris Cagle
- Carolina Rain
- Jason Michael Carroll
- Kenny Chesney
- Trailer Choir
- Eric Church
- Terri Clark
- Confederate Railroad
- Easton Corbin
- Bucky Covington
- Crossin Dixon
- Billy Currington
- Amy Dalley
- Billy Dean
- Kevin Denney
- Diamond Rio
- Joe Diffie
- Dixie Chicks
- Ty England
- Emerson Drive
- Sara Evans
- Jessie Farrell
- Randall Franks
- Brantley Gilbert
- Vince Gill
- Gloriana
- Danny Gokey
- Josh Gracin
- Pat Green
- Clinton Gregory
- Andy Griggs
- Halfway to Hazard
- Joni Harms
- Heartland
- The Higgins
- Faith Hill
- Billy Hoffman
- Steve Holy
- Julianne Hough
- Randy Houser
- Miranda Lambert
- Jack Ingram
- Alan Jackson
- Jessie James
- Jaron and the Long Road to Love
- Jewel
- Buddy Jewell
- Erika Jo
- Brad Johner
- Carolyn Dawn Johnson
- Jamey Johnson
- Zona Jones
- Toby Keith
- Josh Kelley
- Alison Krauss
- Lady Antebellum
- Tracy Lawrence
- Chris LeDoux
- Aaron Lewis
- Little Big Town
- Lonestar
- Love and Theft
- Lyle Lovett
- Mac McAnally
- Scotty McCreery
- Reba McEntire
- Tim McGraw
- Martina McBride
- Jo Dee Messina
- Montgomery Gentry
- John Michael Montgomery
- Justin Moore
- Craig Morgan
- Megan Mullins
- Willie Nelson
- Heidi Newfield
- Gary Nichols
- Joe Nichols
- One More Girl
- Jamie O'Neal
- James Otto
- Jake Owen
- Brad Paisley
- Danielle Peck
- Randy Rogers Band
- Rascal Flatts
- LeAnn Rimes
- Julie Roberts
- Kid Rock
- Kenny Rogers
- Darius Rucker
- Rushlow
- Kevin Sharp
- Crystal Shawanda
- Blake Shelton
- Ashton Shepherd
- Ricky Skaggs
- Steve Miller Band
- Doug Stone
- George Strait
- Taylor Swift
- Shania Twain
- Sugarland
- Cyndi Thomson
- Kellie Pickler
- Aaron Tippin
- Rick Tippe
- Trent Tomlinson
- Trick Pony
- Travis Tritt
- Josh Turner
- Uncle Kracker
- Carrie Underwood
- Keith Urban
- Phil Vassar
- Clay Walker
- Jimmy Wayne
- Emily West
- Whiskey Falls
- Chuck Wicks
- Hank Williams III
- Trent Willmon
- Mark Wills
- Gretchen Wilson
- Lee Ann Womack
- Darryl Worley
- The Wreckers
- Chely Wright
- Trisha Yearwood
- Dwight Yoakam
- Chris Young
- Zac Brown Band

== Modern country-music performers, since 2010 ==
- Luke Bell
- Joni Harms
- A Thousand Horses
- Aaron Lewis
- Jason Cassidy
- Zona Jones
- Aaron Goodvin
- Aaron Pritchett
- Aaron Watson
- Alan Jackson
- Alison Krauss & Union Station
- Andy Gibson
- Mac McAnally
- Ashley Cooke
- Ashley McBryde
- Ashley Monroe
- Ashton Shepherd
- Avery Anna
- Bailey Zimmerman
- The Band Perry
- Beyoncé
- Big & Rich
- Big Kenny
- Billy Currington
- Blackberry Smoke
- Blaine Larsen
- Blake Shelton
- Bomshel
- Brad Paisley
- Brantley Gilbert
- Breland
- Brett Eldredge
- Brett Kissel
- Brett Young
- Brooke Eden
- Brooks & Dunn
- Brothers Osborne
- Bryan Martin
- Bucky Covington
- Caitlin & Will
- Callista Clark
- Cam
- Carly Pearce
- Caroline Jones
- Carrie Underwood
- Carter Faith
- Casey James
- Cassadee Pope
- Chad Brownlee
- Charles Wesley Godwin
- Chase Matthew
- Chase Rice
- Chayce Beckham
- Chris Cagle
- Chris Janson
- Chris Lane
- Chris Stapleton
- Chris Young
- Chuck Wicks
- Clay Walker
- Cody Johnson
- Cody Jinks
- Colt Ford
- Cole Swindell
- Conner Smith
- Corey Kent
- Corey Smith
- Cory Marks
- Craig Campbell
- Craig Morgan
- Cross Canadian Ragweed
- Crossin Dixon
- Dallas Smith
- Dan + Shay
- Danielle Bradbery – Best known for winning season four of The Voice
- Danielle Peck
- Danny Gokey
- Darius Rucker
- Darryl Worley
- David Lee Murphy
- David Nail
- Dean Brody
- Devin Dawson
- Dierks Bentley
- Dolly Parton
- Doug Supernaw
- Drew Baldridge
- Dustin Lynch
- Dylan Marlowe
- Dylan Scott
- Easton Corbin
- Edens Edge
- Ella Langley
- Eli Young Band
- Elle King
- Elvie Shane
- Emily Ann Roberts
- Emily West
- Eric Church
- Eric Paslay
- Ernest
- Faith Hill
- Florida Georgia Line
- Frank Ray
- Frankie Ballard
- Gabby Barrett
- Garth Brooks
- Gary Allan
- Gavin Adcock
- George Birge
- George Strait
- Gloriana
- Granger Smith
- Gretchen Wilson
- Hailey Whitters
- Hank Williams Jr.
- Hank Williams III
- Hardy
- Heidi Newfield
- Hudson Westbrook
- Hunter Hayes
- Ian Munsick
- Ingrid Andress
- The JaneDear Girls
- Jack Ingram
- Jackson Dean
- Jade Eagleson
- Jake Owen
- James Barker Band
- James Otto
- James Wesley
- Jameson Rodgers
- Jamey Johnson
- Jana Kramer
- Jaron and the Long Road to Love
- Jason Aldean
- Jason Michael Carroll
- JB and the Moonshine Band
- JellyRoll
- Jennette McCurdy
- Jerrod Niemann
- Jessica Harp
- Jessie James
- Jessie Murph
- Jewel
- Jimmy Wayne
- Jimmie Allen
- Jo Dee Messina
- Joe Nichols
- Joey + Rory
- John Rich
- Jon Pardi
- Jordan Davis
- Josh Abbott Band
- Josh Gracin
- Josh Kelley
- Josh Ross
- Josh Thompson
- Josh Turner
- JT Hodges
- Julianne Hough
- Justin Moore
- Kacey Musgraves
- Kameron Marlowe
- Kane Brown
- Keith Anderson
- Keith Urban
- Kellie Pickler
- Kelly Clarkson
- Kelsea Ballerini
- Kelsey Hart
- Kenny Chesney
- Kevin Fowler
- Kevin Sharp
- Kid Rock
- Kip Moore
- Kira Isabella
- Kix Brooks
- Koe Wetzel
- Kristin Chenoweth
- The Lacs
- Lady Antebellum
- Lanco
- Laura Bell Bundy
- Lauren Alaina
- LeAnn Rimes
- Lee Ann Womack
- Lee Brice
- Little Big Town
- LoCash Cowboys
- Lonestar
- The Lost Trailers
- Love and Theft
- Luke Bryan
- Luke Combs
- Lyle Lovett
- MacKenzie Carpenter
- MacKenzie Porter
- Maddie & Tae
- Maren Morris
- Mark Chesnutt
- Mark Wills
- Martina McBride
- Mason Ramsey
- Matt Kennon
- Matt Lang
- Matt Mason
- Matt Stell
- Marty Stuart
- Max McNown
- Megan Moroney
- Meghan Patrick
- Michael Ray
- Michelle Branch
- Mickey Guyton
- Midland (band)
- Miranda Lambert
- Miss Willie Brown
- Mitchell Tenpenny
- Montgomery Gentry
- Morgan Evans
- Morgan Wade
- Morgan Wallen
- Nate Haller
- Niko Moon
- Old Dominion
- Oliver Anthony
- Parker McCollum
- Parmalee
- Pat Green
- Phil Vassar
- Pistol Annies
- Post Malone
- Priscilla Block
- RaeLynn
- Randall Franks
- Randy Houser
- Randy Montana
- Randy Travis
- Rascal Flatts
- Reba McEntire
- Reckless Kelly
- Riley Green (singer)
- Rob Georg
- Robyn Ottolini
- Rodney Atkins
- Ronnie Dunn
- Rose Falcon
- Runaway June
- Russell Dickerson
- Ryan Hurd
- Sam Hunt
- Sara Evans
- Sarah Buxton
- Sarah Darling
- Sasha Pieterse
- Scotty McCreery
- Shaboozey
- Shane Profitt
- Shania Twain
- Sheryl Crow
- Shooter Jennings
- Skylar Laine
- Steel Magnolia
- Stella Lefty
- Stephen Wilson Jr.
- Steve Azar
- Steve Earle
- Steve Holy
- Struggle Jennings
- Sugarland
- Sunny Sweeney
- Taylor Swift
- Tegan Marie
- Terri Clark
- The Henningsens
- The Reklaws
- Thomas Rhett
- Thompson Square
- Tigirlily Gold
- Tim McGraw
- Trace Adkins
- Tracy Lawrence
- Trailer Choir
- Travis Denning
- Trent Harmon
- Trent Tomlinson
- Trey Lewis
- Toby Keith
- Travis Denning
- Troy Olsen
- Tucker Wetmore
- Turnpike Troubadours
- Ty Myers
- Tyler Childers
- Tyler Farr
- Tyler Hubbard
- Tyler Joe Miller
- Tyler Nance
- Uncle Kracker
- Upchurch
- Warren Zeiders
- Walker Hayes
- Wheeler Walker Jr.
- Whitney Duncan
- Whiskey Myers
- Willie Nelson
- Wynonna
- Zac Brown Band
- Zach Bryan
- Zach Top

== See also ==
- List of country music performers
