= List of Liberty Records artists =

The following is a list of musicians who have recorded for the Liberty Records label.

== A ==
- Amon Düül II
- Alvin and the Chipmunks
- Sharon Anderson
- Yumi Arai (Toshiba/Alfa/Liberty for her first single, later switched to Toshiba/Alfa/Express for later releases)
- Bryan Austin (Patriot/Liberty)
- Ethel Azama

== B ==
- The Bangles (outside US; Down Kiddie/Liberty)
- Mike Batt (Also UK Head of A&R 68–70)
- Stephanie Bentley
- John Berry (Patriot/Liberty)
- Suzy Bogguss
- Bonzo Dog Band
- Brinsley Schwarz
- Walter Brennan
- Lisa Brokop (Patriot/Liberty)
- Garth Brooks
- Kix Brooks
- Bud & Travis
- John Bunzow
- Johnny Burnette

== C ==
- Can
- Canned Heat
- Captain Beefheart (UK)
- Vikki Carr
- Deana Carter
- Jamie Carter
- Carter Family
- Joe Carson
- Ray Charles
- The Chipmunks
- Classix Nouveaux
- Eddie Cochran
- Hank Cochran
- Shirley Collie
- Creedence Clearwater Revival (UK)

== D ==
- Linda Davis
- Vic Dana
- Charlie Daniels
- Billy Dean
- Martin Denny
- Jackie DeShannon
- Dr. Feelgood
- George Ducas
- The Aynsley Dunbar Retaliation
- Tommy Duncan
- Johnny Dorelli
- Suzanne Doucet

== E ==
- Eddie & the Showmen

== F ==
- Charlie Floyd
- Kim Fowley
- Cleve Francis
- Fischer-Z

== G ==
- The Gants
- Tommy Garrett
- Henry Gibson
- Noah Gordon (Patriot/Liberty)
- Ricky Lynn Gregg
- The Groundhogs

== H ==
- Roy Harper
- Hawkwind
- Help Yourself
- Eddie Heywood
- High Tide
- Highway 101
- Paul Horn
- Hour Glass

== I ==
- The Idle Race

== J ==
- Jan & Dean
- David Lynn Jones
- Spike Jones

== K ==
- Buddy Knox
- Alexis Korner
- Kostas

== L ==
- Chris LeDoux
- Gary Lewis & The Playboys
- Julie London
- Victor Lundberg
- Nellie Lutcher

== M ==
- The Johnny Mann Singers
- Maharishi Mahesh Yogi
- Man
- Manowar
- The Marketts
- Billy Maxted
- Gene McDaniels
- McKenna Mendelson Mainline
- Dean Miller
- Matt Monro
- The Mops (Toshiba/Alfa/Liberty)
- Michael Martin Murphey (Liberty)
- Anne Murray

== N ==
- Willie Nelson
- Nitty Gritty Dirt Band

== O ==
- Johnny O'Keefe

== P ==
- Palomino Road
- Patience and Prudence
- Robbie Patton
- Pearl River
- Dave Pell
- Pirates of the Mississippi
- Popol Vuh
- P.J. Proby

== R ==
- Gerry Rafferty
- The Rankin Family
- Buddy Rich
- Ricky Lynn Gregg
- The Rivingtons
- Kenny Rogers

== S ==
- Ray Sanders
- David Seville
- Del Shannon
- Ravi Shankar
- Sri Sathya Sai Baba (Indian Spiritual Figure)
- Shenandoah
- Troy Shondell
- Red Skelton
- Felix Slatkin
- Warren Smith
- The Stranglers
- Sugarloaf

== T ==
- Gordon Terry
- The T-Bones
- Tanya Tucker
- Ike & Tina Turner

== V ==
- Vanessa-Mae
- The Vapors
- Bobby Vee
- The Ventures

== W ==
- Billy Ward
- Dottie West
- Whitesnake
- Wild Rose
- Tex Williams
- Bob Wills
- Brenton Wood
- Jeff Wood
- Curtis Wright

Slim Whitman

== Y ==
- Timi Yuro

== Z ==
- Si Zentner
