= Breaking New Ground =

Breaking New Ground may refer to:

- Breaking New Ground (Mal Waldron album)
- Breaking New Ground (Wild Rose album)
  - "Breaking New Ground" (song), its title track
