= Why (Jason Aldean song) =

Single by Jason Aldean

from the album Jason Aldean
- Released: November 15, 2005
- Recorded: 2005
- Genre: Country
- Length: 3:33 (album version); 3:05 (radio edit)
- Label: Broken Bow
- Songwriters: Rodney Clawson; Vicky McGehee; John Rich
- Producer: Michael Knox

Jason Aldean singles chronology
"Hicktown" (2005)	"Why" (2005)	"Amarillo Sky" (2006)

"Why" is a song written by Rodney Clawson, Vicky McGehee and John Rich and recorded by American country music artist Jason Aldean. It was released in November 2005 as the second single from Aldean's 2005 self-titled debut album. The song became Aldean's first number one hit on the U.S. Billboard Hot Country Songs chart.

== Content ==
A ballad backed by electric guitar, the song centralizes on the male character who has finally come to the realization that he has caused his lover emotional pain. He then asks himself why he lets himself treat her wrongly, and why he takes so long to show his feelings for her.

== Critical reception ==
Kevin John Coyne of Country Universe gave the song a positive review, saying that it is "interesting" and sounds "very real and sincere".

== Music video ==
The music video was directed by Wes Edwards. It premiered in the week of November 17, 2005.

== Chart performance ==
"Why" debuted at number 49 on the U.S. Billboard Hot Country Songs for the week of December 3, 2005. As of April 2015, the song has sold 675,000 digital copies in the United States.

Chart (2005–2006)	Peak position
Canada Country (Radio & Records)	4
US Billboard Hot 100	43
US Hot Country Songs (Billboard)	1

=== Year-end charts ===
Chart (2006)	Position
US Country Songs (Billboard)	10

== Certifications ==
Region	Certification	Certified units/sales
United States (RIAA)	2× Platinum	2,000,000^{‡}
^{‡} Sales+streaming figures based on certification alone.

== Other versions ==
Country music singer Shannon Brown recorded the song for her 2006 album Corn Fed.
