= Jason Aldean (album) =

Studio album by Jason Aldean
- Released: July 26, 2005
- Studios: Treasure Isle Studios and Legends Studio (Nashville, Tennessee)
- Genre: Country
- Length: 41:16
- Label: Broken Bow
- Producer: Michael Knox

Jason Aldean chronology
Jason Aldean (2005)	Relentless (2007)

Singles from Jason Aldean
- 1. "Hicktown" Released: March 28, 2005; 2. "Why" Released: November 15, 2005; 3. "Amarillo Sky" Released: June 26, 2006

Jason Aldean is the debut album by American country music artist Jason Aldean, released on July 26, 2005, by Broken Bow Records. The album produced three singles on the U.S. Billboard Hot Country Songs charts: "Hicktown" (No. 10), "Why" (No. 1), and "Amarillo Sky" (No. 4). The album has been certified Platinum by the RIAA.

Several of this album's tracks were recorded by other artists, including two of the singles: "Amarillo Sky" previously served as the title track to McBride & the Ride's 2002 album Amarillo Sky, and "Why" was also recorded by Shannon Brown on her 2005 album Corn Fed. In addition, "Good to Go" was recorded by John Corbett for his album John Corbett, from which it was released as a single. Furthermore, "Asphalt Cowboy" was previously recorded by Blake Shelton on his 2003 album The Dreamer.

== Track listing ==
Jason Aldean – Standard edition
No.	Title	Writer(s)	Length
1.	"Hicktown"	Big Kenny; John Rich; Vicky McGehee	5:06
2.	"Amarillo Sky"	Big Kenny; Rich; Rodney Clawson; Bart Pursley	3:23
3.	"Why"	Rich; Clawson; McGehee	3:33
4.	"Even If I Wanted To"	Jason Aldean; Justin Weaver	4:11
5.	"Lonesome U.S.A."	David Lee Murphy; Kim Tribble; Mark Wright	3:40
6.	"Asphalt Cowboy"	Jeff Stevens; Kenny West	4:03
7.	"I'm Just a Man"	Chad Brock; McGehee; Rich	3:17
8.	"You're the Love I Wanna Be In"	Aldean; McGehee; Rich	3:18
9.	"Good to Go"	Clawson; Tim Nichols	4:02
10.	"I Believe in Ghosts"	Marc Beeson; Jim Collins; D. Vincent Williams	3:26
11.	"She Loved Me"	Aldean; Brad Adkins; Bobby Pinson	3:27
Total length:			41:16

Jason Aldean – Deluxe edition
No.	Title	Writer(s)	Length
12.	"Amarillo Sky" (music video)	Big Kenny; Rich; Clawson; Pursley	4:10
13.	"Hicktown" (music video)	Big Kenny; Rich; McGehee	4:09
14.	"Why" (music video)	Rich; Clawson; McGehee	3:36

== Personnel ==
Musicians

- Jason Aldean – lead vocals, backing vocals
- Tony Harrell – keyboards
- Steven King – keyboards
- Kurt Allison – electric guitar
- Michael Noble – acoustic guitar
- Adam Shoenfeld – acoustic guitar, electric guitar
- Jack Sizemore – electric guitar
- Smith Curry – steel guitar, lap steel guitar
- Mike Johnson – steel guitar
- Jason Mowery – fiddle, mandolin
- Tully Kennedy – bass guitar
- Rich Redmond – drums, percussion
- Wes Hightower – backing vocals
- Liana Manis – backing vocals
- Gene Miller – backing vocals

Production and Technical

- Michael Knox – producer
- Peter Coleman – engineer, mixing engineer
- Brandon Epps – second engineer
- Dan Friszell – second engineer
- Sam Martin – second engineer
- Richard Dodd – mastering
- Neena Wright – production assistant
- Mathis Entertainment – management

Visuals

- Luellyn Latocki – art direction
- Ron Roark – graphic design
- Glen Rose – photography

== Chart performance ==
The album has sold 1.6 million copies in the US as of January 2015.

=== Weekly charts ===
Chart (2005)	Peak position
US Billboard 200	37
US Top Country Albums (Billboard)	6
US Independent Albums (Billboard)	1

=== Year-end charts ===
Chart (2005)	Position
US Top Country Albums (Billboard)	48
Chart (2006)	Position
US Billboard 200	125
US Top Country Albums (Billboard)	28
Chart (2007)	Position
US Billboard 200	174
US Top Country Albums (Billboard)	36

=== Singles ===
Year	Title	Peak chart positions	
Year	Title	US Country	US
2005	"Hicktown"	10	68
2005	"Why"	1	43
2006	"Amarillo Sky"	4	59

== Certifications ==
Region	Certification	Certified units/sales
United States (RIAA)	Platinum	1,000,000^{^}
^{^} Shipments figures based on certification alone.
