= John Corbett (album) =

Studio album by John Corbett
- Released: April 4, 2006
- Genre: Country
- Length: 50:21
- Label: Funbone
- Producer: D. Scott Miller, Tara Novick

John Corbett chronology
John Corbett (2006)	Leave Nothin' Behind (2013)

John Corbett is the self-titled debut album of American actor and singer John Corbett. It was released on April 4, 2006 via Funbone Records. The album charted as high as number 45 on Top Country Albums upon release, and included a single which reached the Hot Country Songs charts: "Good to Go".

== Content ==
The album produced only one single: "Good to Go", which peaked at number 43 on the Hot Country Songs charts in 2006. The song debuted at number 48 on that chart dated for the week of February 11, 2006, the highest debut for an independently signed artist's first single since the charts were first tabulated with Nielsen SoundScan in 1990. Jason Aldean previously recorded the song on his 2005 self-titled debut album.

Contributing musicians included Jimmy Hall of Wet Willie, Steve Gorman of The Black Crowes, and George McCorkle of The Marshall Tucker Band. Corbett self-released the album after multiple major labels failed to give him an offer. Corbett's girlfriend, Bo Derek, took the front cover picture.

== Critical reception ==
Robert Woolridge of Country Standard Time reviewed the album with general favor, saying that "Though Corbett does not write any of the tunes here he chooses wisely." and "Corbett delivers strong, soulful vocals throughout, though too often his voice is buried in the mix of layered harmonies." Stephen Thomas Erlewine of Allmusic rated it 3 out of 5 stars, with his review saying that "But what makes this a winning debut is that it feels natural and genuine, as if Corbett isn't attempting to parlay his success as an actor into a music career, he's just simply making the music he wants to make."

== Track listing ==
1. "Bottle of Whiskey" (Gary Nicholson, Jon Randall) – 4:19
2. "Good to Go" (Rodney Clawson, Tim Nichols) – 4:33
3. "Revival" (David Lee, Ashley Gorley, Bryan Simpson) – 4:17
4. "Wichita" (Roxie Dean, Rivers Rutherford, Dave Turnbull, Houston Boyd Robert) – 4:01
5. "Cash" (Jon Randall, Jessi Alexander) – 3:48
6. "Simple Man" (Hal Ketchum, Darrell Scott) – 4:51
7. "Back Door to My Heart" (Mark Selby, Tia Sillers) – 3:26
8. "Best Move" (George McCorkle, D. Scott Miller) – 4:56
9. "Leave" (Bernie Taupin) – 3:46
10. "Waiting on a Heartache" (Brian Butler, Ric Butler, Miller) – 3:21
11. "Judge a Man" (Don Poythress, Barry Dean) – 4:26
12. "Last Stand" (Taupin, Dennis Tufano, Robin Le Mesurier, Jim Cregan) – 4:37

== Personnel ==
Compiled from liner notes.

Musicians

- Mike Brignardello – bass guitar
- Pat Buchanan – electric guitar
- Sarah Buxton – background vocals
- Perry Coleman – background vocals
- John Corbett – lead vocals
- J. T. Corenflos – acoustic guitar, electric guitar
- Steve Gorman – drums
- Jimmy Hall – background vocals, harmonica
- Aubrey Haynie – fiddle
- Mike Johnson – pedal steel guitar, lap steel guitar
- George McCorkle – electric guitar
- D. Scott Miller – acoustic guitar, electric guitar
- Jonell Mosser – background vocals
- Tara Novick – electric guitar
- Mike Rojas – piano, Hammond B-3 organ
- Russell Terrell – background vocals
- Kenny Vaughan – acoustic guitar, electric guitar
- Derek Wolfford – percussion

Technical

- Kevin Beamish – engineering
- Dan Frizsell –engineering, mastering
- D. Scott Miller – production
- Tara Novick – production

== Chart performance ==
Album

Chart (2006)	Peak position
U.S. Billboard Top Country Albums	45
U.S. Billboard Heatseekers	19
U.S. Billboard Top Independent Albums	21

Singles

Year	Single	Peak positions
Year	Single	US Country
2005	"Good to Go"	43
