= Patience and Prudence =

American female vocal duo

Patience & Prudence
- Patience (left) and Prudence (right) in 1956

Background information
- Origin: Los Angeles, California, U.S.
- Genres: Pop; bubblegum pop
- Years active: 1956–1960, 1964
- Labels: Liberty Records; London Records
- Past members: Patience McIntyre; Prudence McIntyre

Patience Ann McIntyre (born August 15, 1942) and Prudence Ann McIntyre (July 12, 1945 – September 15, 2023), known professionally as Patience & Prudence, were two American sisters who were a young vocal duo active from 1956 to 1963.

== Career ==
Patience and Prudence McIntyre were born in 1942 and 1945, respectively, in Los Angeles, California. Their father Mark McIntyre was a conductor, pianist, and songwriter who worked with Frank Sinatra in the 1940s. Patience was named after a woman who authored poetry for The Ladies’ Home Journal in the 1920s, and her younger sister Prudence’s name was selected as one that fit with her elder sister's. In their youth, the girls studied piano and learned to read music. In the summer of 1956, their father brought 14-year-old Patience and 11-year-old Prudence into the Liberty Records studio in Los Angeles.

The duo made a demonstration recording of the song "Tonight You Belong to Me", which had been a hit for Gene Austin in 1927, and was written by Billy Rose and Lee David. Liberty signed them and immediately released a recording of the girls singing the song as a commercial single (with the B-side "A Smile and a Ribbon", a composition with music by Mark McIntyre) and by September the song reached No. 4 on the Billboard chart and No. 28 in the UK Singles Chart, and was the biggest selling record put out by Liberty for two years. It sold over one million copies and reached gold record status. It went on to become one of the best-selling in-store singles in the United States in September 1956.

Their song "Gonna Get Along Without Ya Now" reached No. 11 on the Billboard chart and No. 22 in the UK; its B-side, "The Money Tree", reached No. 73 in the U.S. They appeared on The Perry Como Show on television in September of that year. They also released other singles such as "Little Wheel" and "All I Do Is Dream of You" but failed to reach the charts again.

They released several other singles on the Chattahoochee Records label, including a 1964 re-recording of "Tonight You Belong to Me".

In 1978, they reunited to appear on a Dick Clark television feature and stated that they both did not want to be performers in the first place and that their success was just an "accident". They also stated that their father did not want them to be in the spotlight for personal reasons, so he declined all other television and commercial offers, which prevented both of the girls from furthering their professional music careers.

Collectors Choice issued a CD compilation of all their Liberty Records singles.

Prudence McIntyre died on September 15, 2023, at the age of 78.

== Discography ==
=== Singles ===
Year	Title	Chart position	
Year	Title	US	UK
1956	"Gonna Get Along Without Ya Now" / "The Money Tree"	11	22
1956	"Dreamers' Bay" / "We Can't Sing Rhythm And Blues"		
1956	"Tonight You Belong to Me" / "A Smile and a Ribbon"	4	28
1957	"You Tattletale" / "Very Nice is Bali Bali"		
1957	"Witchcraft" / "Over Here"		
1958	"Tom Thumb's Tune" / "Golly Oh Gee"		
1958	"All I Do Is Dream Of You" / "Your Careless Love"		
1958	"Heavenly Angel" / "Little Wheel"		
1959	"Should I" / "Whisper Whisper" (with Mike Clifford)		
1964	"Didn't I" / "Apples on the Lilac Tree"		
1965	"Tonight You Belong to Me" / "How Can I Tell Him "		

=== Extended plays ===
- A Smile And A Song (1957)

== See also ==
- List of Liberty Records artists
