= Hicktown =

Single by Jason Aldean

from the album Jason Aldean
- Released: March 28, 2005
- Recorded: 2005
- Genre: Country
- Length: 5:06 (album version); 3:35 (radio edit)
- Label: Broken Bow
- Songwriters: Big Kenny; John Rich; Vicky McGehee
- Producer: Michael Knox

Jason Aldean singles chronology
"Hicktown" (2005)	"Why" (2005)

"Hicktown" is the debut single by American country music artist Jason Aldean, released on March 28, 2005, from his self-titled debut album. The song was written by Big & Rich's Big Kenny and John Rich along with Vicky McGehee. It was Aldean's first top 10 hit on the U.S. Billboard Hot Country Songs chart after reaching number 10 in late 2005.

== Content ==
Co-written by Big & Rich along with Vicky McGehee, "Hicktown" is an up-tempo song, and one of many country songs that boast of Southern culture.

"Hicktown" has become Aldean's signature song, with souvenir vanity plates naming it sold at appearances. The song typically closes out Aldean's concert set, with elongated instrumental parts, Aldean banging on cymbals, and several false endings.

== Music video ==
A music video was released for the song, directed by Wes Edwards. The video takes place in a field with people partying and driving on mud, while Jason Aldean and his band are performing. It premiered on April 28, 2005. Most of the music video was filmed in Palmdale, Florida at the C&R Mudhole, that is now closed down. Aldean's sister Kasi (wearing a green tank top) makes a cameo in the video.

== Chart performance ==
The song debuted on the Billboard Hot Country Songs chart at number 55 for the week ending April 23, 2005.

Chart (2005)	Peak position
Canada Country (Radio & Records)	27
US Billboard Hot 100	68
US Hot Country Songs (Billboard)	10

=== Year-end charts ===
Chart (2005)	Position
US Country Songs (Billboard)	48

== Certifications ==
Region	Certification	Certified units/sales
United States (RIAA)	2× Platinum	2,000,000^{‡}
^{‡} Sales+streaming figures based on certification alone.
