= Corn Fed =

Studio album by Shannon Brown
- Released: February 28, 2006
- Genre: Country
- Length: 45:26
- Label: Warner Bros. Nashville
- Producer: John Rich

Singles from Corn Fed
- 1. "Corn Fed" Released: September 26, 2005; 2. "Pearls" Released: February 27, 2006

Professional ratings
Review scores
Source	Rating
Allmusic	4/5 stars
Entertainment Weekly	C−

Corn Fed is the debut studio album by American country music artist Shannon Brown, released on February 28, 2006, via Warner Bros. Nashville. This was Brown's first album to be officially released, as her two previously recorded albums for Arista Nashville and BNA (A Tour of My Heart and Untangle My Heart) went unreleased following lackluster success of their singles at radio. John Rich of the successful duo Big & Rich produced this album, making it similar to the sounds of other country acts at the time such as Gretchen Wilson.

Corn Fed was received favorably by music critics. Two singles were released, the title track and "Pearls". "Corn Fed", the title track, became her first chart entry since 2002's "Untangle My Heart", hitting number 47 on the US Hot Country Songs chart. "Pearls", meanwhile, did not chart. The album reached the top ten of the Heatseekers Albums chart while also entering the Top Country Albums and Billboard 200 charts.

Two songs were previously recorded by other artists; "She Brings the Lightning Down" was initially recorded by Rich on his 1999 debut studio album Underneath the Same Moon, which would officially get a release the same year, and "Why", which would become a number one single for Jason Aldean and was included on his 2005 self-titled debut studio album.

== Track listing ==
Corn Fed track listing
No.	Title	Writer(s)	Length
1.	"AM Radio"		0:20
2.	"Corn Fed"	Shannon Brown; John Rich; Vicky McGehee	3:17
3.	"Big Man"	Brown; Rich; McGehee	2:51
4.	"High Horses"	Julian Bunetta; Blair Daly; Rich	3:55
5.	"Turn to Me"	McGehee; Rich; Gretchen Wilson	3:54
6.	"Can I Get an Amen"	Brown; Daly; Troy Verges	4:07
7.	"Something Good"	Brown; Billy Crain; Tammy Hyler	4:27
8.	"Good Ole Days"	Daly; Rich; Shane Mack	3:31
9.	"I Love 'Em All"	Brown; Rich; McGehee	3:00
10.	"Why"	Rodney Clawson; McGehee; Rich	5:00
11.	"Pearls"	Brown; Hyler; Shaye Smith	3:18
12.	"She Brings the Lightning Down"	McGehee; Rich	3:26
13.	"Small Town Girl"	Brown; Phillip B. White	4:18
Total length:			45:26

== Personnel ==
- Brian Barnett – drums
- Wyatt Beard – background vocals
- Dennis Burnside – piano, Hammond organ, keyboard
- Perry Coleman – background vocals
- Wes Hightower – background vocals
- Mike Johnson – Dobro, pedal steel guitar, lap steel guitar
- Matt Pierson – bass guitar
- Ethan Pilzer – bass guitar
- John Rich – acoustic guitar, background vocals
- Mike Rojas – piano, keyboards
- Jason Sellers – background vocals
- Adam Shoenfeld – electric guitar
- Jonathan Yudkin – Dobro, fiddle, mandolin, violin, viola, cello

== Charts ==
Chart (2006)	Peak position
US Top Country Albums (Billboard)	34
US Billboard 200	163
US Heatseekers Albums (Billboard)	6
