= Chance (band) =

American country music group

- Origin: Texas, U.S.
- Genres: Country
- Years active: 1985–1988
- Labels: Mercury Nashville
- Past members: Jeff Barosh; Mick Barosh; John Buckley; Jon Mulligan; Billy Hafer

Chance was an American country music group composed of Jeff Barosh (vocals, fiddle, steel guitar, sax, guitar), Mick Barosh (drums), John Buckley (guitar), Jon Mulligan (keyboards), and Billy Hafer (bass). The group recorded one album for Mercury Nashville in 1985 which included the Top 40 singles "To Be Lovers" and "She Told Me Yes." Previously known in the south Texas area as "Texas Pride", they changed their name to "Chance" after securing a record deal and gaining national recognition in the mid-1980s. Keyboard player Jon Mulligan was killed by a drunk driver in 1987 on the way home from one of the group's local Texas concerts. Keyboardist Clay Hemphill filled the duty on the keys from 1987 to 1993 during the transition years from "Chance" to "Jeff Chance". Bill Hafer retired in 1993 to pursue his custom flight case business, "Hafer Case". Bruce Repka joined the band in 1993 on keyboards & steel. Fred Rice (bass) came aboard but left a year later. Darrell Jozwiak filled the role of bass guitarist from 1994 until the band played their last gig together in October 1995.

Lead singer Jeff Barosh launched a solo career in the late 1980s - early 1990s as Jeff Chance and charted three singles on the Billboard Hot Country Singles & Tracks chart. Shania Twain sang background vocals on his 1992 album Walk Softly On The Bridges. Barosh died on December 12, 2008, at the age of 53.

== Discography ==
=== Albums ===
Title	Album details	Peak positions
Title	Album details	US Country
Chance	Release date: January 1986; Label: Mercury Records	65

=== Singles ===
Year	Single	US Country	Album
1985	"To Be Lovers"	35	Chance
1985	"You Could Be the One Woman"	45	Chance
1985	"She Told Me Yes"	30	Chance
1986	"I Need Some Good News Bad"	53	Chance
1986	"What Did You Do with My Heart"	60	Chance
