= Breaking New Ground (Wild Rose album) =

Studio album by Wild Rose
- Released: 1988
- Studio: Sound Stage, Studios, Nashville, TN
- Genre: Country
- Label: Universal; Capitol (reissue)
- Producer: James Stroud

Wild Rose chronology
Breaking New Ground (1988)	Straight and Narrow (1990)

Singles from Breaking New Ground
- 1. "Breaking New Ground" Released: August 1989; 2. "Go Down Swingin'" Released: January 13, 1990

Breaking New Ground is the debut studio album by American country music band Wild Rose. Originally issued in 1988 via Universal Records, it was rereleased on April 9, 1990 via Capitol Records. The album includes the singles "Breaking New Ground" and "Go Down Swingin'".

== Critical reception ==
Giving it a "B", Alanna Nash of Entertainment Weekly wrote that "the band offers a kicky program of country-rock, bluegrass, Texas swing, Louisiana spice, honky-tonk, and jazzy 'dawg' music…Little of this is combined into a cohesive sound, but whatever Wild Rose is, it's never boring."

== Track listing ==
No.	Title	Writer(s)	Length
1.	"Breaking New Ground"	Carl Jackson, Jerry Salley	2:54
2.	"I Can't Lose What I Never Had"	Jim Rushing	2:25
3.	"Go Down Swingin'"	Sandy Ramos, Jerry Vandiver	2:37
4.	"Where Did We Go Wrong"	Paul Kramer	3:54
5.	"Lonesome Highway (To the End of the Rainbow)"	Jackson, Lori Lee Yates	3:31
6.	"On the Bayou"	Karen Staley	3:01
7.	"Home Sweet Highway"	Pam Gadd	2:55
8.	"Teach Me to Say Goodbye"	Pam Perry, Jan Buckingham	3:48
9.	"Who Needs You"	Curtis Wright	2:48
10.	"Easy to Say/Hard to Prove"	Don Schlitz, Beth Nielsen Chapman	2:46
11.	"Wild Rose"	Nancy Given, Wanda Vick	2:16

== Personnel ==
Compiled from liner notes.

Wild Rose

- Pam Gadd – lead vocals, background vocals, banjo, acoustic guitar
- Nancy Given Prout – drums, background vocals
- Kathy Mac – bass guitar, background vocals
- Pam Perry – lead vocals, background vocals, mandolin, acoustic guitar
- Wanda Vick – electric guitar, fiddle, Dobro, pedal steel guitar, lap steel guitar, mandolin, acoustic guitar

Additional musicians

- Pat Flynn – acoustic guitar
- Sonny Garrish – pedal steel guitar
- Carl Jackson – acoustic guitar
- John Barlow Jarvis – piano
- Randy McCormick – piano
- Bobbe Seymour – pedal steel guitar
- "Hurricane" James Stroud – percussion

Technical

- Milan Bogdan – digital editing
- John Guess – mixing
- Glenn Meadows – mastering
- James Stroud – production
- Ron Treat – digital recording, overdubbing
- Wild Rose – arranging

== Chart performance ==
Chart (1990)	Peak position
US Top Country Albums (Billboard)	44
