= Tim Malchak =

American country music singer-songwriter (born 1957)

- Born: June 25, 1957 (age 68)
- Origin: Binghamton, New York, U.S.
- Genres: Country, Christian
- Occupation: Singer-songwriter
- Instruments: Vocals, guitar
- Years active: 1982–present
- Labels: Revolver, Alpine, Universal, Full House, River Road, Parable
- Website: malchak.com

Tim Malchak (born June 25, 1957, in Binghamton, New York) is an American country music singer-songwriter. He partnered with Dwight Rucker in 1982 to form the country music duo Malchak & Rucker. Together, they became the first black/white duo in country music history with a single, "Just Like That" to chart. It debuted on the Billboard Hot Country Singles & Tracks chart in 1984.

When the duo disbanded in 1986, Malchak launched a solo career. Alpine Records released his debut album, Colorado Moon, in 1987 and its title track became his first Top 40 single. His second Top 40 single, the self-penned, "Restless Angel" followed as part of his next album, American Man.

It was released in 1988. The album's second single, "It Goes Without Saying," was his highest-charting single on the Billboard Hot Country Singles & Tracks chart, peaking at No. 35. Malchak then signed with Jimmy Bowen's Universal Records for the release of his third album, Different Circles. In 1989, Malchak was slated to be a nominee for the Academy of Country Music Award for New Male Artist of the Year, but did not make the final five.

After the album failed to produce any Top 40 singles, Malchak moved to South Carolina in 1992. In 2001, he released his first Christian album, Pathway to Glory, on his own Parable Records. Later in the year, he launched Tim Malchak Ministries. As of 2017, Malchak has released twelve Christian albums. Currently, he and his wife, Leslie, tour the southeastern United States with their traveling music ministry.

== Discography ==
=== Albums ===
Year	Title	Label
1987	Colorado Moon	Alpine
1988	American Man	Alpine
1989	Different Circles	Universal
1994	Home Town	Full House
1996	The Coast Is Clear	River Road
2001	Pathway to Glory	Parable
2003	Servant's Heart	Parable
2005	Be My Peace	Parable
2007	Boundless	Parable
2010	Sovereign King	Tim Malchak
2013	The Best of Tim Malchak – Volume One	Tim Malchak
2014	The Best of Tim Malchak – Volume Two	Tim Malchak
2016	Plans	Tim Malchak
2017	Morning Hour of Praise	
2018	"Carolina Rain"	

2020 “One Nation Under God”

2021 “Renewed”

2022 "God Knows"

=== Singles ===
Year	Title	Chart Positions		Album
Year	Title	US Country	CAN Country	Album
1984	"Just Like That" (as Malchak & Rucker)	92	—	—
1985	"Why Didn't I Think of That" (as Malchak & Rucker)	67	—	Colorado Moon
1985	"I Could Love You in a Heartbeat" (as Malchak & Rucker)	69	—	Colorado Moon
1986	"Let Me Down Easy" (as Malchak & Rucker)	67	—	Colorado Moon
1986	"Slow Motion" (as Malchak & Rucker)	64	—	Colorado Moon
1986	"Easy Does It"	68	—	Colorado Moon
1987	"Colorado Moon"	37	—	Colorado Moon
1987	"Restless Angel"	39	—	American Man
1988	"It Goes Without Saying"	35	—	American Man
1988	"Not a Night Goes By"	43	—	American Man
1989	"Not Like This"	70	81	Different Circles
1989	"If You Had a Heart"	54	—	Different Circles

=== Music videos ===
Year	Title	Director
1985	"I Could Love You in a Heartbeat"	
1987	"Colorado Moon"	
