= Breaking New Ground (song) =

Single by Wild Rose

from the album Breaking New Ground
- B-side: "Home Sweet Highway"
- Released: August 1989
- Genre: Country
- Length: 2:54
- Label: Universal/Capitol
- Songwriters: Carl Jackson; Jerry Salley
- Producer: James Stroud

Wild Rose singles chronology
| "Breaking New Ground" (1989) | "Go Down Swingin'" (1990) |

"Breaking New Ground" is a song written by Carl Jackson and Jerry Salley, and recorded by American country music group Wild Rose. It was released in August 1989 as the first single and title track from their debut album Breaking New Ground. The song peaked at number 15 on the Billboard Hot Country Singles chart and reached number 42 on the RPM Country Tracks chart in Canada.

== Chart performance ==
| Chart (1989) | Peak position |
|---|---|
| Canada Country Singles (RPM) | 42 |
| US Hot Country Songs (Billboard) | 15 |
