= J. T. Corenflos =

American session musician and country guitarist (1963–2020)

J.T. Corenflos
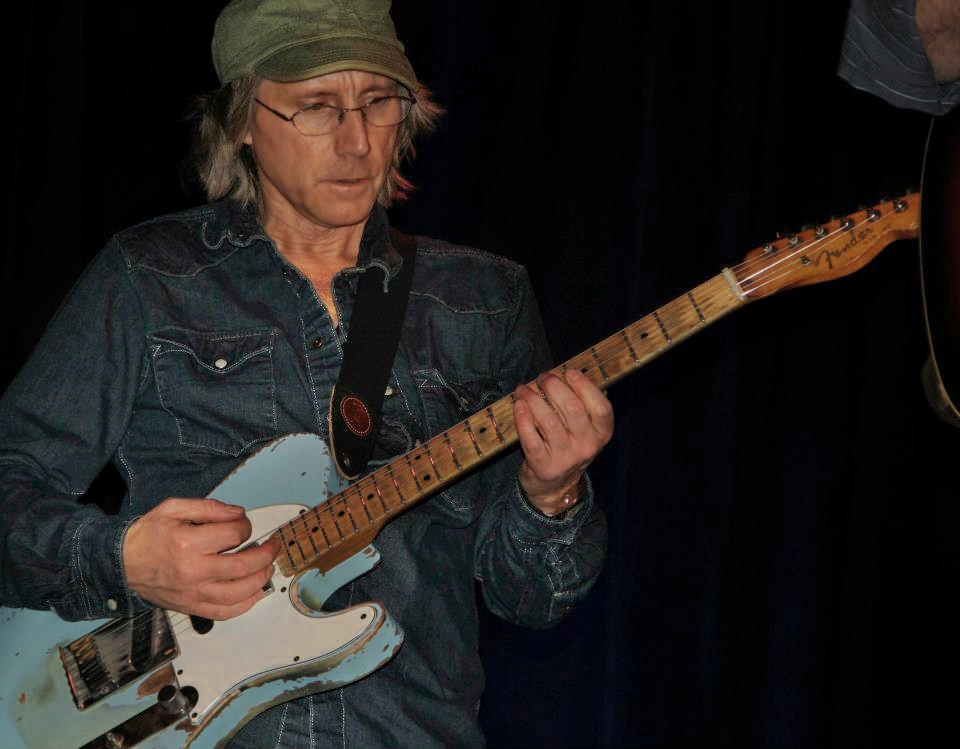

Background information
- Born: Jerry Troy Corenflos; November 6, 1963; Terre Haute, Indiana, U.S.
- Origin: Nashville, Tennessee
- Died: October 24, 2020 (aged 56) Nashville, Tennessee, U.S.
- Genre: Country
- Occupation: Session musician
- Instrument: Electric guitar
- Years active: 1982-2020
- Formerly of: Palomino Road
- Website: jtcorenflos.com

Jerry Troy "J. T." Corenflos (November 6, 1963 – October 24, 2020), was an American session musician and country guitarist, who played on an estimated 75 Number One hit records as well as hundreds of other recordings and hits. He received 14 nominations for "Guitarist of the Year" from the Academy of Country Music (2002–2012, 2014–2015, and 2020), winning in 2012 and 2020.

== Early life ==
Jerry Troy Corenflos was born on November 6, 1963, in Terre Haute, Indiana to parents Jerry and Alice Corenflos. His dad (Big Jerry) was a carpenter, who worked at Overhead Door company and, later, at Indiana State University. Although a gifted and hardworking carpenter, Big Jerry's real passion was music, a passion he shared and nurtured in the young Jerry Troy. JT's mom, Alice, worked at the Columbia Records pressing plant and the 8-track plant in Terre Haute. Alice later ran the small restaurant, the Shuffle Inn Restaurant and worked at (Larry Bird's) Boston Connection restaurant. JT has a son, Jacob Corenflos, who is also a musician, and two siblings, brother Steve Corenflos and sister Cathy.

Growing up in the Highlands neighborhood of Terre Haute, JT's childhood was filled with playing sports, riding bikes and hanging out with neighborhood friends, all of whom would remain friends throughout his life. He attended Rankin elementary school, Terre Town elementary school, Otter Creek junior high school, North Vigo high school. It was during these early years, that JT began playing guitar under the tutelage of his dad. JT's quiet passion and determination to master the guitar, drove his rapid development, and by junior high he had already outgrown most guitar instructors in the area. During these years, JT played with his dad's bands in a wide variety of venues and circumstances.

Corenflos wrote on his website:

I played just about every venue possible: Moose Lodge, VFW, American Legion, beer joint, nightclub, motel lounge, ice cream social, wedding reception, super market parking lot, frat party, high school dance, street festival, biker bar, birthday party, nudist colony (no kidding) small town opry, bean dinner, community center and backyard bbq within a hundred miles. Not to mention all the basements, and garages starting out. BIG TIME STUFF!

== Career ==
In March 1982, JT moved to Nashville to play guitar for Jean Shepard (Capital/United Artist Records, Grand ole Opry). He worked with Jean for about a year and a half performing mostly at the Grand ole Opry and occasionally some road dates. In early summer of 1983, JT auditioned and landed a job with Joe Stampley (Epic/CBS records), and worked with him for seven years doing road dates. Occasionally, Joe would collaborate with fellow singer Moe Bandy as "Moe and Joe", doing some television shows and recording as a duo. When not on the road, JT played in clubs around Nashville with several different writer/artists, sometimes helping them work on their demos in the studio. One of those bands was called "The Fantastic" Blue Tick Hounds featuring David Lee Murphy. The Blue Tick Hounds played all over Nashville through the mid and late 80s, and JT continued working with David Lee Murphy throughout his life. .

In the spring of 1990, JT left the road to stay in Nashville and focus on doing studio work. He played every opportunity that was presented to him regardless of importance. During this period of taking whatever studio work he could get his hands on, JT met many other great players, aspiring songwriters, artists and producers, many of whom he continued to work with throughout his life. Including Luke Bryan, Dolly Parton, Bob Seger, Sheryl Crow and Taylor Swift Obituary Archives - Page 35 of 83

By 1992, JT was starting to get a good bit of demo session work, while helping form a band called Palomino Road (Capitol/Liberty Records). Palomino Road did one album and about a year and a half of road dates. After Palomino Road disbanded, JT decided to focus 100% on session work.

== Somewhere Under The Radar ==
In 2015, Corenflos released a solo album titled Somewhere Under The Radar, composed of 12 instrumental songs showcasing his electric guitar playing.

== Gear ==
Corenflos was known for playing a blue Telecaster style guitar with a 1984 contoured alder Joe Glaser body and the V-shaped neck from a late 1956 Fender Esquire.

== Death ==
Corenflos had battled lung disease for several years and was hospitalized with pneumonia in September 2020. He died on October 24, 2020, at Vanderbilt University Medical Center in Nashville, at the age of 56.

Multiple artists and members of Nashville's studio community posted tributes to Corenflos, including Luke Bryan and Derek Wells.
