= Jeff Chance =

American singer-songwriter

- Born: Jeffrey Barosh Sr. December 13, 1954; El Campo, Texas, United States
- Died: December 12, 2008 (aged 53) El Campo, Texas, United States
- Genres: Country
- Occupation: Singer
- Instruments: Vocals, fiddle
- Years active: 1985–1992, 2008
- Labels: Mercury Nashville, Curb, Music Master
- Formerly of: Chance

Jeffrey Barosh Sr. (December 13, 1954 in El Campo, Texas – December 12, 2008) was an American country music singer, known professionally as Jeff Chance. He was initially a member of the five-piece band "Texas Pride" which later became Chance recording one album for Mercury Records in 1985. As a solo artist, he recorded four albums "Picture on the Wall" 1991 and "Walk Softly on the Bridges" 1992 for Mercury Records Nashville and "Back Again" 2008 and "Between the Sheets" 2013 for Music Master and charted five country singles in the mid-1980s. The second album included backing vocals from Shania Twain.

== Discography ==
=== Albums ===
Title	Album details
Picture on the Wall	Release date: 1990; Label: Mercury Nashville
Walk Softly on the Bridges	Release date: August 18, 1992; Label: Mercury Nashville
Back Again	Release date: March 25, 2008; Label: Music Master
Between the Sheets	Release date: June 12, 2013; Label: Music Master

=== Singles ===
Year	Single	Peak chart positions		Album
Year	Single	US Country	CAN Country	Album
1988	"So Far Not So Good"	64	—	Picture on the Wall
1988	"Hopelessly Falling"	52	—	Picture on the Wall
1988	"Let It Burn"	57	—	Picture on the Wall
1990	"Talkin' to Your Picture"	—	—	Picture on the Wall
1991	"Strangers on the Street"	—	—	Picture on the Wall
1991	"30 Days in 20 Years"	—	—	Picture on the Wall
1992	"A Heartache on Her Hands"	—	63	Walk Softly on the Bridges
1992	"Walk Softly on the Bridges"	—	—	Walk Softly on the Bridges
2008	"Soul of the Wine"	—	—	Back Again
2013	"Sad Eyed Lady"	—	—	Between the Sheets
"—" denotes releases that did not chart

=== Music videos ===
Year	Video	Director
1990	"Talkin' to Your Picture"	Tim Newman
1992	"A Heartache on Her Hands"	Jeffrey C. Phillips
1992	"Walk Softly on the Bridges"	Michael Merriman
