= Zona Jones =

American singer-songwriter

- Born: 1963 (age 61–62)
- Origin: Kingsville, Texas, United States
- Genres: Country
- Occupation: Singer/Attorney
- Instrument: Vocals
- Years active: 2004-present
- Labels: D/Quarterback, Rocky Comfort

Zona Jones (born 1963 in Corpus Christi, Texas; raised in Valentine, Texas) is an American country music singer and attorney. Signed to D/Quarterback Records in 2004, he released his debut album Harleys & Horses and charted three singles from it, including the No. 47 "Two Hearts." In 2008, he signed to Rocky Comfort Records, a label owned by Tracy Lawrence, to release his next album, 2009's Prove Me Right.

== Discography ==
=== Albums ===
Title	Album details
Harleys & Horses	Release date: February 3, 2004; Label: Quarterback/D
Prove Me Right	Release date: June 2, 2009; Label: Rocky Comfort

=== Singles ===
Year	Single	Peak positions	Album
Year	Single	US Country	Album
2004	"House of Negotiable Affections"	53	Harleys & Horses
2004	"Whiskey Kind of Way"	—	Harleys & Horses
2005	"Two Hearts"	47	Harleys & Horses
2006	"I'll Give It to You"	57	Harleys & Horses
2008	"You Should've Seen Her This Morning"	—	Prove Me Right
2009	"Bluer Than Blue"	—	Prove Me Right
2009	"Day Off"	—	Prove Me Right
2010	"Prove Me Right"	—	Prove Me Right
"—" denotes releases that did not chart

=== Music videos ===
Year	Video
2004	"House of Negotiable Affections"
2004	"Whiskey Kind of Way"
2009	"Bluer Than Blue"
