= Trader-Price =

- Origin: Foss, Oklahoma, United States
- Genres: Country
- Years active: 1976-2016
- Labels: Universal, Capitol
- Past members: Dan Trader-Price; Chris Trader-Price; Erick Trader-Price; Don Bell

Trader-Price is an American country music group from Foss, Oklahoma composed of brothers Dan, Chris and Erick Trader-Price and Don Bell. In 1989, Trader-Price charted two singles on the Billboard Hot Country Singles & Tracks chart. Two of their singles also charted on the RPM Country Tracks chart in Canada in 1990. A music video was filmed for their single "Lately Rose".

== Discography ==
=== Albums ===
Title	Album details
Trader-Price	Release date: March 27, 1990; Label: Capitol Records

=== Singles ===
Year	Single	Peak chart positions		Album
Year	Single	US Country	CAN Country	Album
1989	"Sad Eyes"	55	—	Trader-Price
1989	"Lately Rose"	64	80	Trader-Price
1990	"Karma Road"	—	73	Trader-Price
"—" denotes releases that did not chart

=== Music videos ===
Year	Video	Director
1989	"Lately Rose"	R. Brad Murano
