= Rob Georg =

German country music singer (b. 1975)

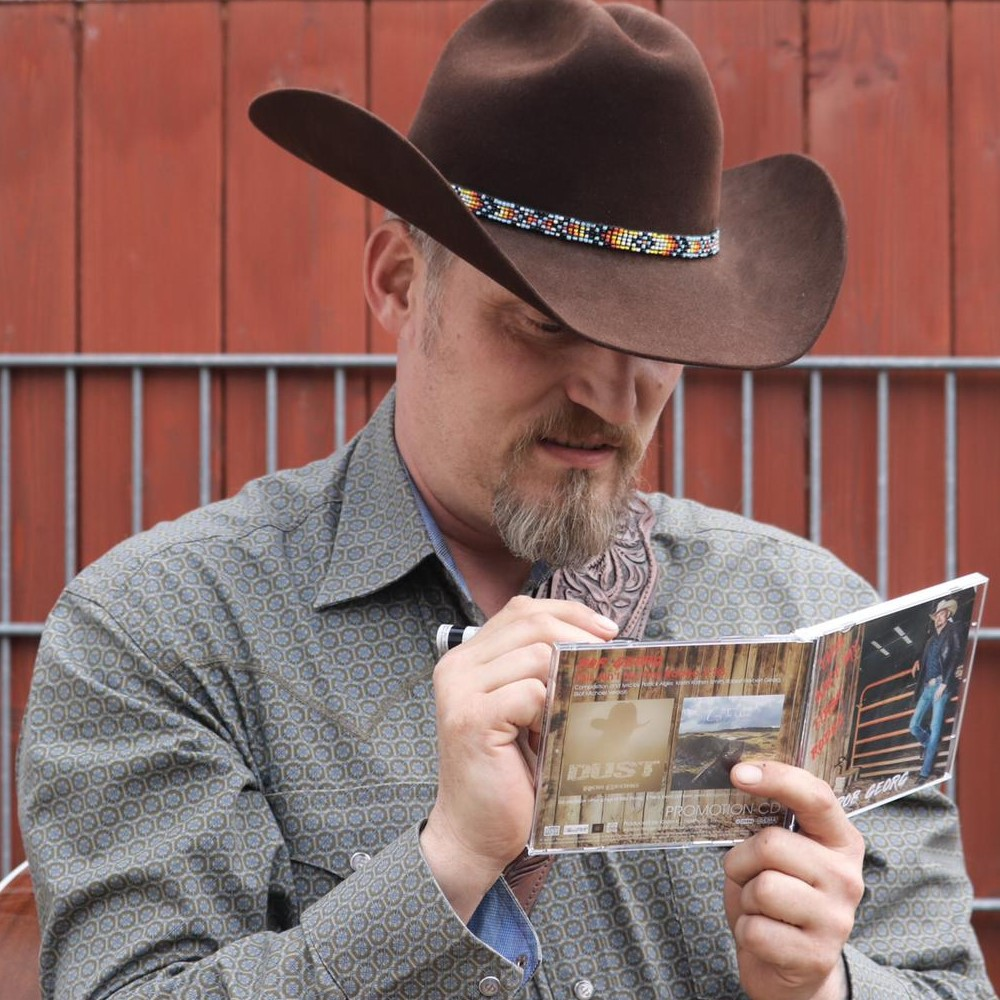

Background information
- Born: September 24, 1975 (age 51)
- Origin: Germany
- Genre: Country
- Occupation: Singer-songwriter
- Instruments: Vocals; guitar; piano
- Years active: 2018–present
- Website: rob-georg-music.com

Rob Georg (born 24 September 1975) is a German country music singer. His records are regularly tracked in Nashville.

== Biography ==
Georg was born in the city of Tübingen in Germany. As a child, he learned to play piano; as a teenager he switched to guitar and started to write his own songs. He bought his first guitar at the age of 14. Georg began his career with the song ‘Push That Horn’ which was released in June 2018. His first ever full band release from December 2018, the song "This Ain't My First Rodeo" made it into the US National Radio Hits AC Charts Top Ten. Also his following radio releases until today made it into the US National Radio Hits AC Charts, the song "Carry The Wind", which he wrote for his horse in heaven, was leading these charts for three weeks in October 2019, followed by "Dust" in being on position 1 in February 2020 and "Ghost in September 2020.

In January 2020 his Debut Album "Radio Cowboy" was released with 15 songs on it. The nomination for two awards, the "New Music Award" in three categories in the US, the Fair Play Country Music Red Carpet Awards in the Netherlands and being announced the winner of the Country Artist of the Year 2020 Award by Warlock Asylum International News gave him a good start in early 2020. In March 2020 he won the New Music Award in the category “Country Breakthrough Artist of the Year 2020“ in the US.

== Discography ==
- Radio Cowboy (2020)
