= Shannon Brown (singer) =

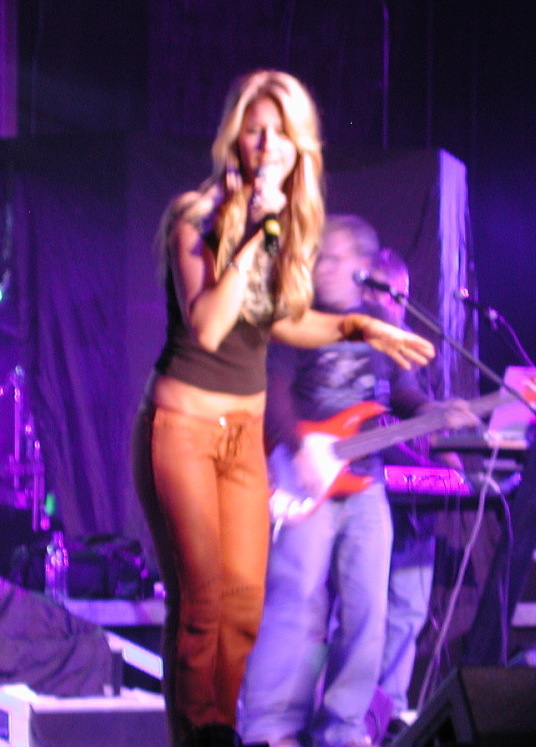
- Brown in 2004

Background information
- Born: Shannon Leigh Brown; July 23, 1973 (age 52); Spirit Lake, Iowa, U.S.
- Genres: Country
- Occupation: Singer-songwriter
- Years active: 1997–present
- Labels: Arista Nashville; BNA; Warner Bros.

Shannon Leigh Brown (born July 23, 1973) is an American country music singer from Spirit Lake, Iowa. Although she has recorded three albums on various labels, only one of these – 2006's Corn Fed – was released. In her career, she has charted four singles on the Billboard country charts, with her highest-charting single being a 2002 cover of Deborah Allen's "Baby I Lied", at number 40. She also contributed the song "Half a Man" to the soundtrack for the 1998 film Happy, Texas.

== Biography ==
After several years of touring the Midwest with her father running the soundboard and her mom running lights, Shannon decided to make the move to Nashville, Tennessee. She paid the bills singing songwriters' demo sessions and managed to maintain her touring schedule of 160 dates a year. Her vocal stylings and industrious approach did not go unnoticed. She is married to video director Shaun Silva who directed the video for "Corn Fed."

== Career ==
Brown's first recording contract was with Arista Nashville in 1997. A year later, she began work on her debut album A Tour of My Heart. Although the album's lead single (titled "I Won't Lie") entered the Billboard Hot Country Singles & Tracks (now Hot Country Songs) charts, A Tour of My Heart was ultimately unreleased. Brown also contributed the song "Half a Man" to the soundtrack of the film Happy, Texas in 1998

In late 2001, she left for the BNA label. While on BNA, she began work on a second album, from which two singles were released. The first of these, a song titled "Baby I Lied", was a cover of Deborah Allen's Top 5 hit single from 1983. Brown's cover became her only Top 40 hit upon its release. A second single from her BNA album, titled "Untangle My Heart", also charted. Brown's second album also remained unreleased, however, and she exited BNA not long afterward.

Warner Bros. Records signed Brown to her third recording contract in late 2005. That year, she made her fourth chart entry with the song "Corn Fed". Reaching a peak of 47 on the country music charts, it served as the lead single to her first album for Warner Bros., also titled Corn Fed. Her third album overall, Corn Fed was also Brown's first album to be released commercially. The album was produced by John Rich, one half of country music duo Big & Rich. After its second single, "Pearls", failed to chart, Brown and Warner Bros. parted ways.

== Discography ==
=== Albums ===
Title	Album details	Peak chart positions		
Title	Album details	US	US Country	US Heat.
Corn Fed	Release date: February 28, 2006; Label: Warner Bros. Records	163	34	6

=== Singles ===
Year	Title	Peak positions	Album
Year	Title	US Country	Album
1998	"I Won't Lie" (Note: "I Won't Lie" also reached number 67 on the RPM Country Tracks chart in Canada.)	58	A Tour of My Heart (unreleased)
1999	"Half a Man"	—	Happy, Texas (soundtrack)
2001	"Baby I Lied"	40	Untangle My Heart (unreleased)
2002	"Untangle My Heart"	58	Untangle My Heart (unreleased)
2005	"Corn Fed"	47	Corn Fed
2006	"Pearls"	—	Corn Fed
"—" denotes releases that did not chart

=== Music videos ===
Year	Title	Director
1998	"I Won't Lie"	Steven Goldmann
1999	"Half a Man"	
2005	"Corn Fed"	Shaun Silva
