= Amber Dotson =

American singer-songwriter

- Origin: Garland, Texas, United States
- Genre: Country
- Occupation: Singer
- Instrument: Vocals
- Years active: 2004-present
- Label: Capitol Nashville

Amber Dotson (born in Garland, Texas) is an American country music artist. Initially a songwriter for Sony/Tree Publishing, Dotson soon began singing demos as well. She also made an appearance on Travis Tritt's 2004 album My Honky Tonk History as a background vocalist. George Strait heard some of the singer's demos, and asked her to join him on his 2005 tour, which also included Dierks Bentley. Dotson was signed to Capitol Records Nashville in 2005, and although she released two singles for the label, she did not release an album.

== Discography ==
=== Singles ===
Year	Single	Peak positions
Year	Single	US Country
2005	"I'll Try Anything"	59
2005	"I Ain't Your Mama"	—
"—" denotes releases that did not chart

=== Music videos ===
Year	Video	Director
2005	"I'll Try Anything"	Peter Zavadil
2005	"I Ain't Your Mama"	Wes Edwards
