= Steven Wayne Horton =

American singer-songwriter

- Born: February 24, 1954
- Origin: Memphis, Tennessee, U.S.
- Died: August 7, 2006 (aged 52)
- Genre: Country
- Occupation: Singer
- Instruments: Vocals, guitar
- Years active: 1989
- Label: Capitol

Steven Wayne Horton (February 24, 1954–August 7, 2006) was an American country music singer. Horton's eponymous debut album was released by Capitol Nashville in 1989. Its first single, "Roll Over", was his only song to enter the Billboard Hot Country Singles & Tracks chart, peaking at No. 68 in 1989. A second single, "Tennessee Plates," peaked at No. 80 on the RPM Country Tracks chart in Canada.

== Biography ==
Steven Wayne Horton was born in Memphis, Tennessee. He took musical inspiration from Jerry Lee Lewis and Elvis Presley, and began playing guitar in fourth grade. In his preteen years, he formed a band that performed cover versions of rockabilly songs.

At a showing of the 1989 Jerry Lee Lewis biopic Great Balls of Fire! in Memphis, Horton performed a special 45-minute set with Lewis. That same year, he signed with Capitol Records Nashville and released his self-titled debut album, Tproduced by Memphis-based guitarist Jack Holder. Wayne Blesdoe of the Knoxville News-Sentinel gave the album a mixed review. He called it "well produced and fun" for its rockabilly influences, but considered it "old news" for the same reason due to the rise of artists whom he considered stylistically similar such as Marty Stuart and Steve Earle.

Two singles were released from the album. His debut single "Roll Over" received a positive review from Lisa Smith and Cyndi Hoelzle of Gavin Report, who compared his voice favorably to Presley's. The song peaked at number 68 on Billboard Hot Country Songs. A second single, a cover of John Hiatt's "Tennessee Plates", charted at number 80 on the Country Tracks chart of the former RPM magazine in Canada, but did not chart in the United States.

Horton released no further material, and died on August 7, 2006.

== Discography ==
=== Albums ===
Year	Title	Label
1989	Steven Wayne Horton	Capitol

=== Singles ===
Year	Title	Chart Positions		Album
Year	Title	US Country	CAN Country	Album
1989	"Roll Over"	68	54	Steven Wayne Horton
1989	"Tennessee Plates"	—	80	Steven Wayne Horton
