= Jameson Clark (singer) =

American country music singer

- Born: 1972 (age 52–53)
- Origin: Starr, South Carolina
- Genres: Country
- Occupation: Singer-songwriter
- Instrument: Vocals
- Years active: 2001–present
- Labels: Capitol

Jameson Clark (born 1972 in Starr, South Carolina) is an American country music singer. Between 2001 and 2002, he recorded for Capitol Records and charted two singles: "Don't Play Any Love Songs" and "You da Man", in addition to releasing an album titled Workin' on a Groove.

Ray Waddell of Billboard magazine gave Workin' on a Groove a mostly-positive review, saying that Clark "is having himself a good ol' time". It also received a positive review from Matt Bjorke of About.com, who compared Clark's sound to Dwight Yoakam, Toby Keith, and Hank Williams III.

== Workin' on a Groove (2002) ==
Workin' on a Groove

Studio album by Jameson Clark
- Released: October 8, 2002
- Genre: Country
- Label: Capitol No. 32301
- Producer: Jameson Clark; Ron Stuve; Christy DiNapoli

=== Track listing ===
1. "Waitin' on the Whiskey" (Jameson Clark, Mark Irwin) – 2:32
2. "You da Man" (Clark, Craig Wiseman) – 3:47
3. "I'm Gonna Burn for This" (Clark, Irwin, Josh Kear) – 3:09
4. "All Afternoon" (Clark, Irwin, Kear) – 3:27
5. "I Want It All" (Clark, Irwin, Kear) – 4:03
6. "I Like Blondes" (Clark, Bob Regan) – 3:36
7. "Workin' on a Groove" (Clark, Irwin, Kear) – 3:41
8. "When I'm Done" (Clark, Irwin) – 4:01

=== Singles ===
Year	Single	Peak positions	Album
Year	Single	US Country	Album
2001	"Don't Play Any Love Songs"	52	non-album songs
2002	"Still Smokin'"	—	non-album songs
2002	"You da Man"	51	Workin' on a Groove
"—" denotes releases that did not chart

=== Music videos ===
Year	Video
2001	"Don't Play Any Love Songs"
2002	"You da Man"
