= Universal Records (1988) =

Defunct American country music record label

- Founded: 1988; 38 years ago
- Founder: Jimmy Bowen
- Defunct: 1989
- Status: Defunct
- Distributor: MCA Nashville
- Genre: Country
- Country of origin: United States
- Location: Nashville, Tennessee

Universal Records was an American country music record label. Established in 1988 by Jimmy Bowen, it was merged into Capitol Records Nashville in 1989.

== History ==
Record producer Jimmy Bowen established the Universal Records label in December 1988. It was distributed by MCA Nashville, and featured its own team of producers, promotion, and artists and repertoire (A&R). The label's roster at foundation consisted of Joe Barnhill, Lacy J. Dalton, Larry Gatlin & the Gatlin Brothers, Joni Harms, Tim Malchak, Scott McQuaig, Nitty Gritty Dirt Band, Carl Perkins, Eddie Rabbitt, Eddy Raven, and Roger Whittaker. Dalton's Survivor was issued in January 1989 as the label's inaugural album. Nitty Gritty Dirt Band also issued Will the Circle Be Unbroken: Volume Two through the label.

In July 1989, Bowen announced that Universal would be the first Nashville label not to issue phonograph records. A September 1989 article in Billboard described the label as "fledgling" and noted that projects by John Anderson, Wild Rose, and other artists had been delayed.

Bowen dissolved the Universal label in December 1989, and its entire roster was merged into Capitol Records Nashville when Bowen assumed presidency of that division.
