= Ricky Lynn Gregg =

American singer

- Born: August 22, 1959 (age 66); Henderson, Texas, United States
- Origin: Henderson, Texas, United States
- Genres: Country
- Occupation: Singer
- Instruments: Vocals; Acoustic guitar Electric guitar Harmonica; Piano
- Years active: 1978–present
- Labels: Liberty; Rowe Music Group
- Website: http://rickylynngregg.com

Ricky Lynn Gregg (born August 22, 1959) is a country music artist of Native American descent. Active between the years of 1992 and 2001, he has recorded three studio albums: two on Capitol/Liberty Records (1992's Ricky Lynn Gregg and 1994's Get a Little Closer) and one on Rowe Music Group (2001's Careful What You Wish For). His first two albums produced three hit singles on the Billboard country music charts, including the No. 36-peaking "If I Had a Cheatin' Heart".

== Musical career ==
Ricky Lynn Gregg was raised in Longview, Texas, and began singing in the church at a very early age. His earliest influences were gospel and country. As a teenager in school Gregg was influenced by rock & roll and formed the "Ricky Lynn Gregg Project" playing in local venues around his hometown. In 1978 Gregg moved to Ft Worth, Texas and began performing as guitarist and singer for a band known as "Savvy" with their debut album "Made In Texas" being released in 1982. Gregg was also a member of Head East between 1984 and 1987. By 1992, Gregg was performing as a solo singer; the same year, he signed to Liberty Records and released his self titled debut album. The album produced a No. 34 single in "If I Had a Cheatin' Heart", a cover of a Mel Street song. Following it were "Can You Feel It" and "Three Nickels and a Dime". In 1993, Billboard ranked him at No. 4 on their list of Top New Country Artists of the Year.

A second album, titled Get a Little Closer, was released on Liberty in 1994, with its title track being the only single. One year later, Gregg's manager, Jimmy Bowen, retired due to thyroid cancer. In 1997, Gregg found another manager, named Eddie Rhines, who helped the singer rebuild his fan base. By 2001, his third album, titled Careful What You Wish For, was released on the then-newly established independent label Rowe Music Group (RMG).

Gregg has also begun a charity called Trail of Hope, which provides clothing for underprivileged Cherokee, Choctaw and Sioux Indians.

== Discography ==
=== Albums ===
Title	Album details	Peak chart positions		
Title	Album details	US Country	US	US Heat
Ricky Lynn Gregg	Release date: April 20, 1992; Label: Liberty Records	37	190	9
Get a Little Closer	Release date: July 26, 1994; Label: Liberty Records	—	—	—
Careful What You Wish For	Release date: April 17, 2001; Label: Row Music Group	—	—	—
"—" denotes releases that did not chart

=== Singles ===
Year	Single	Peak chart positions			Album
Year	Single	US Country	US Bubbling	CAN Country	Album
1993	"If I Had a Cheatin' Heart"	36	9	42	Ricky Lynn Gregg
1993	"Can You Feel It"	58	—	79	Ricky Lynn Gregg
1993	"Three Nickels and a Dime"	—	—	—	Ricky Lynn Gregg
1994	"No Place Left to Go"	—	—	—	Ricky Lynn Gregg
1994	"Get a Little Closer"	73	—	—	Get a Little Closer
1994	"After the Fire Is Gone"	—	—	—	Get a Little Closer
1995	"To Find Where I Belong"	—	—	—	Get a Little Closer
1995	"Santa Claus is Coming to Town"	—	—	—	single only
2001	"Be Careful What You Wish For"	—	—	—	Careful What You Wish For
2002	"I Wanna Be Loved by You"	—	—	—	Careful What You Wish For
"—" denotes releases that did not chart

=== Music videos ===
Year	Video	Director
1993	"If I Had a Cheatin' Heart"	Marc Ball
1993	"Can You Feel It"	Steve Boyle
1993	"Three Nickels and a Dime"	Ron Angus/Larry Boothby
1994	"Get a Little Closer"	Michael Merriman
1994	"After the Fire Is Gone"	Michael Merriman
1995	"To Find Where I Belong"	
2001	"Be Careful What You Wish For"	Tom Bevins
2002	"I Wanna Be Loved by You"	Peter Lippman
