= Palomino Road =

American country music group

- Origin: Nashville, Tennessee, United States
- Genres: Country, southern rock
- Years active: 1992–1993
- Label: Liberty
- Past members: J. T. Corenflos; Randy Frazier; Ronnie Guilbeau; James Lewis

Palomino Road was an American country music group composed of Ronnie Guilbeau (lead vocals), J. T. Corenflos (guitar), James Lewis (drums) and Randy Frazier (bass guitar). Founded in 1992, the band recorded a self-titled album for Liberty Records, and charted with a cover of George Jones's 1955 debut single "Why Baby Why".

== History ==
All four members of Palomino Road had experience in country music prior to the band's foundation. Lead singer Ronnie Guilbeau (son of Gib Guilbeau of The Flying Burrito Brothers) had played in that band before a 1980s move to Nashville, Tennessee. J.T. Corenflos, the band's guitarist, was previously a backing musician for Joe Stampley, while Randy Frazier had previously backed Sammy Kershaw and James Lewis had been active as a drummer in Nashville since the 1970s.

Palomino Road signed to Liberty Records in 1992, releasing its self-titled debut album in early 1993. This record featured no contributions from external musicians. Its first single, a cover of George Jones's 1955 single "Why Baby Why", reached number 46 on the Billboard Hot Country Singles & Tracks (now Hot Country Songs) charts. The album's second single, "The Best That You Can Do", was released in 1993 but failed to chart. The band broke up later that same year.

In 1994, Frazier joined the band McBride & the Ride as bass guitarist. The lineup with Frazier disbanded in 1996. Corenflos, meanwhile, found work as a session guitarist.

== Discography ==
=== Studio albums ===
Title	Album details	Peak positions
Title	Album details	US Country
Palomino Road	Release date: March 9, 1993; Label: Liberty Records	—

=== Singles ===
Year	Single	Peak chart positions	
Year	Single	US Country	CAN Country
1992	"Why Baby Why"	46	42
1993	"The Best That You Can Do"	—	—
"—" denotes releases that did not chart

=== Music videos ===
Year	Video
1992	"Why Baby Why"
1993	"The Best That You Can Do"
