= Joni Harms =

American country music singer-songwriter (born 1959)

- Born: November 5, 1959 (age 66)
- Origin: Canby, Oregon, US
- Genres: Country
- Occupation: Singer-songwriter
- Instruments: Vocals, guitar
- Years active: 1985–present
- Labels: Universal, Capitol Nashville, Warner Bros., Paras, Wildcatter, Harms Way Music
- Website: www.joniharms.com

Joni Harms (born November 5, 1959, in Canby, Oregon) is an American country music singer-songwriter. Between 1990 and 2020, Harms released fourteen studio albums plus her album Oregon to Ireland recorded live with The Sheerin Family Band in Moate, Ireland and released in 2014. She also charted two singles on the Billboard Hot Country Singles & Tracks chart. Her highest charting single, "I Need a Wife," peaked at No. 34 in 1989.

== Discography ==
=== Albums ===
Year	Title	Label
1985	Thoughts of You	Harms Way Music
1986	I Want to Sing for You	Harms Way Music
1990	Hometown Girl	Capitol
1995	Whatever It Takes	Harms Way Music
1996	Christmas in the Country	Harms Way Music
1998	Cowgirl Dreams	Warner Bros.
1999	Are We There Yet?	Harms Way Music
2001	After All	Paras
2004	Let's Put the Western Back in the Country	Wildcatter
2006	That's Faith	Harms Way Music
2011	Harms Way	Harms Way Music
2014	Oregon to Ireland	Harms Way Music
2018	Lucky 13	Harms Way Music
2019	Joni and Olivia Harms: Our Favorites	Harms Way Music
2020	Heart Behind The Badge	Harms Way Music

=== Singles ===
Year	Single	Peak chart positions		Album
Year	Single	US Country	CAN Country	Album
1989	"I Need a Wife"	34	53	Hometown Girl
1989	"The Only Thing Bluer Than His Eyes"	54	96	Hometown Girl
2020	"Heart Behind The Badge"	–	–	Heart Behind The Badge
