= Scott McQuaig =

American country music singer-songwriter (born 1959)

- Born: January 27, 1959 (age 67)
- Origin: Meridian, Mississippi
- Genres: Country
- Occupation: Singer-songwriter
- Instrument: Vocals
- Years active: 1981–present
- Labels: Universal, Capitol, Scott McQuaig Records
- Website: www.scottmcquaigmusic.com

Scott McQuaig (born January 27, 1959, in Meridian, Mississippi) is an American country music singer-songwriter. In 1989, McQuaig charted two singles on the Billboard Hot Country Singles & Tracks chart. A third single charted on the RPM Country Tracks chart in Canada in 1990.

== Discography ==
=== Albums ===
Title	Album details
Scott McQuaig	Release date: March 27, 1990; Label: Capitol Records
I'm Still Falling	Release date: November 10, 2012; Label: Scott McQuaig Music
A Song Away from You	Release date: April 14, 2018; Label: Scott McQuaig Music

=== Singles ===
Year	Single	Peak chart positions		Album
Year	Single	US Country	CAN Country	Album
1989	"Honky Tonk Amnesia"	56	—	Scott McQuaig
1989	"Johnny and the Dreamers"	54	—	Scott McQuaig
1990	"Old Memory"	—^{A}	52	Scott McQuaig
"—" denotes releases that did not chart

Notes:

- ^{A} "Old Memory" did not chart on Hot Country Songs, but peaked at No. 6 on Hot Country Radio Breakouts.

== Music videos ==
Year	Video	Director
1989	"Honky Tonk Amnesia"	Jim May
