= Wild Rose (band) =

American country music band

Background information
- Origin: Nashville, Tennessee, United States
- Genres: Country
- Years active: 1988–1991
- Labels: Universal, Capitol, Liberty
- Past members: Pamela Gadd; Kathy Mac; Pam Perry; Nancy Given; Wanda Vick

Wild Rose was an American country music band founded in 1988 by five women: Pamela Gadd (lead and background vocals, banjo), Kathy Mac (bass guitar, vocals), Pam Perry (lead and harmony vocals, guitar, mandolin), Nancy Given (drums, vocals), and Wanda Vick (guitar, mandolin, fiddle, Dobro, steel guitar). Between 1988 and 1991, they recorded three studio albums, including two on Liberty Records. In that same time span, they charted three singles on the Billboard Hot Country Singles & Tracks (now Hot Country Songs) charts. Since their disbanding in 1991, Wanda Vick has worked as a session musician. Gadd has continued to write and perform in the music industry, and was featured as part of country music legend Porter Wagoner's band until his death in 2007. Gadd and Wagoner recorded an album of duets together.

== Biography ==
Wild Rose was founded in 1988 by Wanda Vick, who had previously been a session musician for country music artist Lynn Anderson, and later a member of Porter Wagoner's road band Right Combination. The group's co-founder, drummer Nancy Given, was also a former member of Right Combination. (Her then-husband was Brian Prout of Diamond Rio.) Prout was followed by vocalist/banjo player Pamela Gadd and vocalist/guitarist Pam Perry, both formerly members of the bluegrass band New Coon Creek Girls. Completing the band's lineup was bass guitarist Kathy Mac.

Initially, the five women performed under the name Miss Behavin'. However, they changed to the name Wild Rose shortly before signing to Jimmy Bowen's Universal. Under the production of James Stroud, Wild Rose's debut album (titled Breakin' New Ground) was released in 1988. The album produced one hit single in its title track, which peaked at number 15 on the Billboard country charts. Universal closed not long afterwards.

Wild Rose later made an appearance on a television special titled Night of 100 Stars in 1990. Later that year, Capitol Records re-issued the band's debut album, and released a second single from it. The re-issued album earned Grammy Award and Academy of Country Music nominations for the band. Wild Rose later issued another album for Liberty before disbanding in 1991.

== Discography ==
=== Albums ===
Title	Album details	Peak positions
Title	Album details	US Country
Breaking New Ground	Release date: March 27, 1990; Label: Capitol Records	44
Straight and Narrow	Release date: September 17, 1990; Label: Capitol Records	—
Listen to Your Heart	Release date: September 10, 1991; Label: Capitol Records	—
"—" denotes releases that did not chart

=== Singles ===
Year	Single	Peak chart positions		Album
Year	Single	US Country	CAN Country	Album
1989	"Breaking New Ground"	15	42	Breaking New Ground
1990	"Go Down Swingin'"	38	33	Breaking New Ground
1990	"Where Did We Go Wrong"	—^{A}	90	Breaking New Ground
1990	"Everything He Touches (Turns to Gold)"	—	—	Straight and Narrow
1991	"Rock-a-Bye Heart"	—	—	Straight and Narrow
1991	"Straight and Narrow"	73	—	Straight and Narrow
1991	"There Goes My Love"	—	—	Listen to Your Heart
1991	"Listen to Your Heart"	—	—	Listen to Your Heart
"—" denotes releases that did not chart

Notes:

- ^{A} "Where Did We Go Wrong" did not chart on Hot Country Songs, but peaked at No. 4 on Hot Country Radio Breakouts.

=== Music videos ===
Year	Video	Director
1989	"Breaking New Ground"	Jim May
1990	"Go Down Swingin'"	
1990	"Everything He Touches (Turns to Gold)"	Greg Crutcher
1991	"Straight and Narrow"	Greg Crutcher

== Awards and nominations ==
Year	Organization	Award	Nominee/Work	Result
1990	Academy of Country Music Awards	Top New Vocal Group or Duet	Wild Rose	Nominated
1991	Grammy Awards	Best Country Instrumental Performance	"Wild Rose"	Nominated
