= List of Music Corporation of America artists =

This is a list of artists on Music Corporation of America. MCA comprises the Nashville branches of MCA Records, Mercury Records and Capitol Records. Formerly, the company included the Nashville branch of DreamWorks Records.

== MCA Nashville Records ==
As MCA Records reissued recordings previously released on other labels, only country music artists whose recordings were first issued on the MCA or MCA Nashville label are to be listed here.

- Kassi Ashton
- Dierks Bentley
- Luke Bryan
- Jordan Davis
- Carter Faith
- Vince Gill
- Mickey Guyton
- Sam Hunt
- Little Big Town
- Parker McCollum
- Reba McEntire
- Madden Metcalf
- Abigail Osborn
- Jon Pardi
- Blake Proehl
- Darius Rucker
- George Strait
- Carrie Underwood
- Keith Urban

=== Former artists ===
- Gary Allan (from Decca)
- Bill Anderson
- Atlanta
- The Bellamy Brothers (MCA/Curb)
- Marty Brown
- Ed Bruce
- Buck Howdy
- Jimmy Buffett (from ABC)
- Tracy Byrd
- Lionel Cartwright
- Mark Chesnutt
- Roy Clark (from ABC)
- John Conlee
- Ronnie Dove
- Bobbie Cryner
- Desert Rose Band (MCA/Curb)
- Clare Dunn
- Ronnie Dunn (Churchill/MCA)
- Steve Earle
- Alecia Elliott
- Evangeline (Margaritaville)
- Terri Gibbs
- Nanci Griffith
- Merle Haggard
- Hanna-McEuen (singles only, album was issued on DreamWorks)
- Keith Harling
- Mallary Hope
- Hot Apple Pie (singles only, album was issued on DreamWorks)
- James House
- Randy Houser
- Rebecca Lynn Howard
- Jedd Hughes
- Waylon Jennings
- Olivia Newton-John
- George Jones
- Wynonna Judd (MCA/Curb)
- Josh Kelley
- Shannon Lawson
- Brenda Lee (from Decca)
- Joni Lee
- Patty Loveless
- Lyle Lovett (MCA/Curb)
- Shelby Lynne
- Barbara Mandrell (from ABC)
- Vincent Mason
- Kathy Mattea
- The Mavericks
- McAlyster
- McBride & the Ride
- Ronnie McDowell
- Bill Monroe (from Decca)
- Kip Moore
- Allison Moorer
- Lorrie Morgan (from ABC)
- David Lee Murphy
- Kacey Musgraves
- David Nail
- The Oak Ridge Boys (from ABC)
- Catie Offerman
- J. P. Pennington
- Randy Rogers Band
- Raybon Brothers
- Dennis Robbins
- John Wesley Ryles
- Run C&W
- John Schneider
- Earl Scruggs
- Ashton Shepherd
- Sons of the Desert
- Roger Springer
- Karen Staley
- Ray Stevens
- Marty Stuart
- Marsha Thornton
- Tanya Tucker
- Josh Turner
- Conway Twitty
- Gene Watson
- Drake White
- The Whites
- Little David Wilkins
- Don Williams
- Kelly Willis
- Lee Ann Womack (from Decca; left MCA in 2006 and rejoined in 2008)
- Chely Wright
- Curtis Wright (MCA/Airborne)
- Tammy Wynette
- Trisha Yearwood
- James & Michael Younger

=== Formerly on Decca Nashville ===
- Bill Anderson
- Rhett Akins
- Gary Allan
- Patsy Cline
- Mark Chesnutt
- Helen Darling
- Frazier River
- Rebecca Lynn Howard
- Chris Knight
- Brenda Lee
- Loretta Lynn
- Dolly Parton
- Dawn Sears
- Shane Stockton
- Mel Tillis
- Conway Twitty
- Lee Ann Womack

=== Formerly on Rising Tide Nashville ===
- Matraca Berg
- The Buffalo Club
- Scotty Emerick
- Jack Ingram
- J. C. Jones
- Delbert McClinton
- Nitty Gritty Dirt Band
- Rebecca Lynn Howard
- Kris Tyler
- Tony Toliver

=== Formerly on DreamWorks Nashville ===
- Jessica Andrews
- Lisa Angelle
- Linda Davis
- Roxie Dean
- Scotty Emerick
- Emerson Drive
- Jeff Foxworthy
- Hanna-McEuen
- Hot Apple Pie
- Joanna Janét
- Jolie & The Wanted
- Toby Keith
- Tracy Lawrence
- Mac McAnally
- The Nitty Gritty Dirt Band
- Danielle Peck
- Michelle Poe
- Redmon & Vale
- Johnny Reid
- Shane Sellers
- Chalee Tennison
- Randy Travis
- Mike Walker
- Jimmy Wayne
- Darryl Worley

== Mercury Nashville Records ==
Artists whose only UMG-distributed recordings were first issued by MGM Records or Polydor Records are not listed here.

=== Current artists ===
- Brothers Osborne
- Eric Church
- Dalton Davis
- Luke Grimes
- Jacob Hackworth
- Tyler Hubbard
- Alan Jackson
- Miranda Lambert
- Brad Paisley
- Josh Ross (Core/Universal Canada/Mercury Nashville)
- Chris Stapleton
- Tucker Wetmore
- Kenny Whitmire

=== Former artists ===
- Lauren Alaina (Interscope/Mercury Nashville)
- Daniele Alexander
- Harley Allen
- John Anderson
- Lynn Anderson
- Rayburn Anthony
- Steve Azar
- Butch Baker
- The Bama Band
- The Band Perry (Interscope/Mercury Nashville)
- Priscilla Block
- Bon Jovi (promotion only)
- Larry Boone
- Boy Named Banjo
- Laura Bell Bundy
- John Brannen
- The Burch Sisters
- Rodney Carrington
- Johnny Cash
- Chance
- Terri Clark
- Coldwater Jane
- Easton Corbin
- Corbin/Hanner
- Neal Coty
- Billy Currington
- Billy Ray Cyrus
- Davis Daniel
- Travis Denning
- Wesley Dennis
- Daisy Dern
- Dalton Dover
- Roy Drusky
- Dave Dudley
- Meredith Edwards
- Leon Everette
- Halfway to Hazard (StyleSonic/Mercury Nashville)
- Tom T. Hall
- Eric Heatherly
- Julianne Hough
- Jamey Johnson
- David Lynn Jones
- Toby Keith
- The Kentucky Headhunters
- Waylon Jennings
- Sammy Kershaw
- Jeff Knight
- Kris Kristofferson
- Tracy Lawrence
- Bryce Leatherwood
- Little Big Town
- Maddie & Tae
- Cledus Maggard & the Citizen's Band
- Marcel
- Jim Matt
- Kathy Mattea
- Scotty McCreery (Interscope/Mercury Nashville)
- Brian McComas
- Reba McEntire
- Shane Minor
- Randy Montana
- Kacey Musgraves
- David Nail
- Jennifer Nettles
- Gary Nichols
- James Otto
- Randy Rogers Band
- Julie Roberts
- Ronna Reeves
- Kim Richey
- Johnny Rodriguez
- Jenny Simpson
- Anthony Smith
- Canaan Smith
- The Statler Brothers
- Keith Stegall
- Sugarland
- Glenn Sutton
- Shania Twain
- Twister Alley
- Dan Tyminski
- The War and Treaty
- Jacky Ward
- John & Audrey Wiggins
- Mark Wills
- Holly Williams
- Sam Williams
- Lee Ann Womack
- The Wrays
- Wright Brothers Band
- Wynonna (Mercury/Curb)
- Faron Young

=== Formerly on Polydor Nashville ===
- 4 Runner
- Amie Comeaux
- Davis Daniel
- Clinton Gregory
- Toby Keith
- The Moffatts
- Chely Wright

== Capitol Records Nashville ==
=== Former artists ===
- Trace Adkins
- Hoyt Axton
- Susan Ashton
- The Bama Band
- Joe Barnhill
- Dierks Bentley
- Stephanie Bentley
- John Berry
- Suzy Bogguss
- Lisa Brokop
- Garth Brooks
- Kix Brooks
- T. Graham Brown
- Luke Bryan
- Rodney Carrington
- Chris Cagle
- Glen Campbell
- Paulette Carlson
- Deana Carter
- Jameson Clark
- Jessi Colter
- Billy "Crash" Craddock
- Kenny Dale
- Linda Davis
- Clay Davidson
- Billy Dean
- The Delevantes
- Amber Dotson
- George Ducas
- Whitney Duncan
- Ty England
- Skip Ewing
- Carter Faith
- Cleve Francis
- Crystal Gayle (United Artists/Liberty)
- Ricky Lynn Gregg
- Mickey Guyton
- Merle Haggard
- Adam Hambrick (Buena Vista/Capitol Nashville)
- Caylee Hammack
- Jennifer Hanson
- Joni Harms
- Walker Hayes
- Hootie & The Blowfish
- Steven Wayne Horton
- The Jenkins
- David Lynn Jones
- Charles Kelley
- Lady A (formerly Lady Antebellum)
- Chris LeDoux
- Joni Lee
- Little Big Town
- Tom Mabe
- Barbara Mandrell
- Mason Dixon
- Delbert McClinton
- Mindy McCready
- Jennette McCurdy
- Mel McDaniel
- Scott McQuaig
- Dean Miller
- Dude Mowrey
- Anne Murray
- Emilio Navaira
- Willie Nelson
- Juice Newton
- Nitty Gritty Dirt Band
- Jamie O'Neal
- Allison Paige
- Palomino Road
- Jon Pardi
- Pearl River
- Pirates of the Mississippi
- Eddie Rabbitt
- The Ranch
- Eddy Raven
- Ashley Ray
- Julie Reeves
- River Road
- Kenny Rogers
- Roy Rogers
- Linda Ronstadt
- Darius Rucker
- Sawyer Brown (Curb/Capitol)
- Don Schlitz
- Thom Schuyler
- Shenandoah
- Ryan Shupe & The RubberBand
- Russell Smith
- Jo-El Sonnier
- Verlon Thompson
- Cyndi Thomson
- Trader-Price
- Tanya Tucker
- Conway Twitty
- Carrie Underwood
- Keith Urban
- Steve Wariner
- Timothy Wayne
- Emily West
- Dottie West
- Cheryl Wheeler
- Lari White
- Wild Rose
- Jeff Wood
- Tim Wilson
- Curtis Wright
- Billy Yates
- Faron Young

=== Formerly on Patriot Nashville ===
- Bryan Austin
- John Berry
- Lisa Brokop
- Noah Gordon

=== Formerly on Virgin Nashville ===
- Chris Cagle
- Clay Davidson
- Jerry Kilgore
- Tom Mabe
- Roy D. Mercer
- Julie Reeves
- River Road

== EMI Records Nashville ==
=== Former artists ===
- Gary Allan
- Kelleigh Bannen
- Brothers Osborne
- Eric Church
- Tyler Hubbard
- Alan Jackson
- Jon Langston (32 Bridge Entertainment/EMI Records Nashville)
- Chrissy Metz
- Kylie Morgan
- Jennifer Nettles
- Troy Olsen
- Brad Paisley
- Eric Paslay
- Hillary Scott & the Scott Family
- Tucker Wetmore
- Anne Wilson

== Buena Vista Records ==
- CB30
