= List of Virgin Records artists =

The following artists (musicians or bands) have had releases with Virgin Records.

== # ==
- Thirty Seconds to Mars (Immortal/Virgin)
- The 69 Eyes
- 311
- 52nd Street

== A ==
- Aaliyah (Blackground/Virgin)
- Paula Abdul
- Albin Lee Meldau
- Adelitas Way
- Agung Gede
- Ado (Japan)
- A Perfect Circle
- After 7
- Aftershock
- Air
- Alice in Chains
- Alien
- Brooke Allison
- Marc Almond
- The Almost (Tooth and Nail)
- Altan
- Althea and Donna
- Amaral
- Amen
- American Music Club
- AM Taxi
- Amir Obè (After Platinum)
- Amorphis
- Carleen Anderson
- And One
- Animal Logic
- Antique
- Tasmin Archer
- The Ark
- Atomic Kitten
- The Avant Gardener
- Kevin Ayers
- Avicii
- Ayushita Nugraha (Virgin Jogjakarta)

== B ==
- Joan Baez
- Balaam and the Angel
- Bandolero
- The Big Heavy
- Tony Banks (outside US/Canada)
- Toni Basil (Radialchoice/Virgin) (outside US/Canada)
- Bastille
- BBB (Virgin/Mercury Jogjakarta)
- Victoria Beckham
- David Bedford
- Beenie Man
- The Big Dish
- Benjamin Biolay
- Thom Bishop
- Bizzy Bone (After Platinum)
- Black Rebel Motorcycle Club
- Peter Blegvad
- Blind Guardian
- Blossoms
- Blue
- Blue Man Group
- The Blue Nile (Linn/Virgin)
- Blur (US only)
- Body Count
- Boxer
  - David Bowie (US only)
- Boy George (More Protein/Virgin)
- Brake Brothers Band
- Breathe
- Brother Cane
- Melanie Brown
- Bruce Boniface
- Bubba Sparxxx
- Emma Bunton
- Burrell (1988)
- Brake Brothers Band
- BY THE BEAT

== C ==
- Cabaret Voltaire
- Camper Van Beethoven
- Can
- Captain Beefheart
- Melanie C
- Chris Cagle (Virgin Nashville)
- Mariah Carey (Former)
- Belinda Carlisle (outside US & Canada until 1991, then worldwide in 1993)
- Cellophane
- The Chemical Brothers
- Che'Nelle
- Neneh Cherry
- China Crisis
- Chvrches
- Anne Clark
- Gilby Clarke
- College Boyz
- Phil Collins (UK and Ireland)
- Comateens
- The Constellations
- Cory Gunz (After Platinum)
- Nikka Costa
- Sagarika Mukherjee Da Costa
- Kevin Coyne
- Cracker
- The Cult
- Culture Club
- Curve
- Ivor Cutler
- Cutting Crew
- Holger Czukay
- Mark Curry
- Charlie Green V(CG5)

== D ==
- Dave Gahan (US only)
- Deaf Pedestrians
- Déjà
- Deutsch Amerikanische Freundschaft
- Daft Punk
- Étienne Daho
- Roger Daltrey (10/Virgin) (outside US/Canada)
- Danny Wilson
- Clay Davidson (Virgin Nashville)
- D'Angelo
- Deadmau5
- Depeche Mode (Mute/Virgin) (US/France)
- Devo (UK/Europe only)
- Howard Devoto
- Divinyls
- Thomas Dolby (outside US/Canada)
- Does It Offend You, Yeah?
- Dreadzone
- dc Talk (ForeFront/Virgin)
- Hilary Duff (4Ever Hilary only in Italy) (via Hollywood Records)
- Stephen Tin Tin Duffy
- The Dukes of Stratosphear
- Dwele

== E ==
- Eden xo (former)
- The Edge
- Efua
- Electronic (outside the US and Canada)
- Emily and the Strangers
- Endgames
- Enigma
- Eurythmics* (outside US/Australasia)
- Evanescence
- Everything but the Girl (except US & Canada)
- Every Little Thing (Japan)
- The Exies
- Ella Eyre
- Emeli Sandé (outside US)
- Ez Mil

== F ==
- Ricky Fanté
- Perry Farrell
- Fat Joe
- Faust
- Bryan Ferry
- A Fine Frenzy
- Fingerprintz
- Fivespeed
- Fishmans
- Florence + The Machine
- Tim Finn
- The Flying Lizards
- The Flying Pickets
- Julia Fordham
- Fountains of Wayne
- John Foxx
- Fra Lippo Lippi
- Peter Frampton
- Frazier Chorus

== G ==
- Peter Gabriel (outside US & Canada)
- Gang Starr
- General Public
- Genesis (outside US & Canada)
- Max A. George
- The Geraldine Fibbers
- Gillan
- Ian Gillan
- Girls Can't Help It (Outside USA) (USA - Sire/Virgin)
- The Golden Palominos (Germany only)
- Goldfrapp
- Goldrush
- Gong
- The Good, the Bad & the Queen
- Gorillaz (US only)
- Gorki
- Gravity Kills (Europe & Japan only)
- Loren Gray
- Great and Lady Soul
- Green River Ordinance
- Grizfolk
- David Guetta
- Guru

== H ==
- Steve Hackett (outside US)
- Geri Halliwell
- Françoise Hardy
- Ben Harper
- Lalah Hathaway
- Hawkwind (Charisma; UK only)
- Murray Head
- Heaven 17
- Håkan Hellström
- Henry Cow
- Lauran Hibberd
- Steve Hillage
- Holly and the Italians
- Robert Holmes
- The Human League
- HRVY

== I ==
- Iggy Pop
- James Iha
- Ima Robot
- Immature
- Inner City
- Interview
- Mark Isham
- Ivan Iusco
- It Bites

== J ==
- Jah Wobble
- Janet Jackson
- The Japanese Popstars
- Jay Chou
- Joe Jackson
- Japan
- Jamie Scott
- Jamie T
- JBO
- Jesus Loves You
- Jin
- Johnny Hates Jazz
- Juliet
- Jelena Karleuša

== K ==
- Kavana
- Kavinsky
- Kelis
- Jerry Kilgore (Virgin Nashville)
- Killing Joke
- King Crimson
- King Swamp
- Frankie Knuckles
- Konirata
- The Kooks
- Korn
- k-os
- Lenny Kravitz

== L ==
- Shona Laing
- LANY (Sunset Garden)
- The Last Goodnight
- Latin Alliance
- Lauv
- Ava Leigh
- Julian Lennon (except US & Canada)
- LCD Soundsystem
- Les Rita Mitsouko
- Le Toya
- Lewis Capaldi
- Lil' Eazy-E
- Linton Kwesi Johnson
- Courtney Love
- Loudhouse
- Cheryl Lynn
- Loren Gray
- Loose Ends
- Luniz (U.S. only)(Virgin/C-Note/Noo Trybe)

== M ==
- Kirsty MacColl
- Rita MacNeil (Virgin Canada)
- Madness (outside the US & Canada)
- Madrugada
- Magazine
- Cheb Mami
- Manfred Mann's Earth Band
- Mano Negra
- Manowar
- Lene Marlin
- Laura Marling
- Zeeteah Massiah
- Massive Attack
- Matia Bazar
- MC Skat Kat
- Malcolm McLaren
- Martha and the Muffins (Dinidisc/Virgin Canada)
- Holle Thee Maxwell
- Meat Loaf (outside US & Canada 1992–99; US & Canada 2007–10)
- Roy D. Mercer (Virgin Nashville)
- Miami Horror
- George Michael (outside US & Canada until 1999)
- Mick Karn
- Mickey 3D
- Mighty Diamonds
- Mike + The Mechanics (outside the US and Canada)
- Microdisney
- The Monochrome Set
- Gary Moore
- Moose (US only)
- The Motors
- Bob Mould
- The Music
- My Favorite Highway

== N ==
- Jimmy Nail
- Nazareth (Mooncrest/Charisma; UK only)
- NCT 127 (Korean releases only)
- N*E*R*D
- Nettspend
- Tom Newman
- Newsboys (StarSong/Forefront/Virgin)
- NF
- Now That's What I Call Music! (compilation series)
- Nikka Costa
- Michael Nyman

== O ==
- Philip Oakey & Giorgio Moroder
- Liam O'Connor
- Mary Margaret O'Hara
- Mike Oldfield
- Lisa Ono (1997–2006)
- Oomph!
- Roy Orbison
- Orchestral Manoeuvres in the Dark
- Stacie Orrico
- The Other Ones
- Outside Edge

== P ==
- The Pale Fountains
- Palladium
- The Paradox (Hundred Days/Virgin)
- Paris Angels
- Hope Partlow
- Penetration
- Amanda Perez
- Anthony Phillips
- Sam Phillips
- Billie Piper
- Placebo
- Pekka Pohjola
- Porcelain Black
- Tristan Prettyman
- Pretty Poison
- The Professionals
- Professor Green
- Maxi Priest
- Public Image Ltd.
- Purple Ribbon All-Stars
- Pure Moods (compilation series)

== Q ==
- Queen (Virgin EMI) (outside US/Canada)

== R ==
- The Railway Children
- Rain Tree Crow
- Rascalz
- RBD
- Reamonn
- The Records
- Axelle Red
- The Red Jumpsuit Apparatus
- Julie Reeves (Virgin Nashville)
- Priscilla Renea (Capitol/Virgin joining)
- Richard Ashcroft
- Keith Richards
- Juliet Richardson
- Rip Rig + Panic
- Rise Against
- River Road (Virgin Nashville)
- The Rolling Stones
- Christy Carlson Romano
- Roxx Gang
- Roxy Music (E.G./Virgin)
- Röyksopp
- The Rutles
- The Ruts
- Ruth Lorenzo (2009–2010)
- Robbie Williams (2009–2010)

== S ==
- Saosin
- Sacred Spirit
- Ryuichi Sakamoto
- Sandra
- Savage Progress
- Saving Abel
- Boz Scaggs
- Scarlett and Black
- Jon Secada
- September Mourning
- The Sex Pistols
- Shaan
- Shaggy (Former)
- Shane Harper
- Shapeshifters
- Sharissa
- Feargal Sharkey
- SheSays
- SHINee (Japan)
- Shonen Knife (North America/France)
- Shooting Star
- Sick Puppies
- Simple Minds
- Six
- Skunk Anansie
- Slapp Happy
- The Smashing Pumpkins (Hut [outside North America]/Virgin)
- Elliott Smith
- Sneaker Pimps
- Snow
- Something Happens
- Soul II Soul
- Source Direct
- Sparks
- Spice Girls
- Stacie Orrico
- The Starting Line
- Die Sterne
- Jermaine Stewart (10/Virgin)
- Joss Stone
- The Stone Roses
- Syd Straw
- Suicidal Tendencies
- Swedish House Mafia (former)
- Switched
- David Sylvian and Robert Fripp

== T ==
- The Table
- Tangerine Dream
- Terror Squad (Terror Squad/Imperial/Virgin)
- Thalía
- That Petrol Emotion
- The Thrills
- Yann Tiersen
- Tin Tin Out
- Toto Coelo aka Total Coelo in USA (Radialchoice/Virgin) Chrysalis in USA
- Pete Townshend
- T'Pau (Siren/Virgin)
- Traffic
- Trina
- Trypes
- KT Tunstall (Relentless/Virgin)
- Turbonegro
- Tina Turner (US only)
- Twin Gambino (U.S. only)

== U ==
- UB40 (DEP International/Virgin)
- Unbelievable Truth
- Underoath (UK)
- Hikaru Utada (Japan; 1998–2005)

== V ==
- Brooke Valentine
- The Vamps
- Velcra
- The Verve
- Angela Via
- Vicky Shu (Virgin Jogjakarta)

== W ==
- Rick Wakeman (Charisma/Virgin)
- Scott Walker
- The Wallflowers
- Warrior
- Delroy Washington
- We Are Scientists
- Brandi Wells (UK only)
- Wendy & Lisa
- Whale
- When in Rome
- The Who
- Wigwam
- Steve Winwood
- Roger Wootton
- Working Week
- Link Wray
- Robert Wyatt

== X ==
- XTC
- Xylina Spathia

== Y ==
- Yanni
- Y-c'el
- You Am I
- You Me At Six
- Sydney Youngblood
- Yellowman
- Yuei Phitchayaphak

== Z ==
- Warren Zevon
- Zaho de Sagazan
