= List of MCA Records artists =

The following is a list of artists who have had recordings with MCA Records.
For MCA Records' country music artists, see List of MCA Nashville artists.
As MCA reissued recordings previously released on other labels, only artists whose recordings were first issued on the MCA label are listed here.

== 0-9 ==
- 1:43 (MCA Music Philippines)

== A ==
- A Music Theory (MCA Music Philippines)
- Adam Ant
- Afternoon Delights
- Johnny Alegre (MCA Music Philippines)
- All About Eve (MCA UK; Ultraviolet only)
- Allure
- Alvin and the Chipmunks
- Andy Summers
- The Angels / Angel City
- Anthony Hamilton (Uptown/MCA)
- Aqua (US)
- A*Teens
- Autograph (Russian band)
- Avant (Magic Johnson Music/MCA)
- Axe
- Akina Nakamori (Japanese singer)

== B ==
- Bang Tango
- Richard Barone
- Bell Biv DeVoe
- Regina Belle
- Beijing Spring
- Big Lurch
- Birtha (from ABC/Dunhill)
- Blackalicious (Quannum Projects/MCA)
- Black Grape
- Bobby "Blue" Bland (from ABC)
- The Blessing
- Mary J. Blige (Uptown/MCA)
- Best Kissers in the World
- Blue Tears
- Body
- Boston
- The Bottles
- Boulevard
- Box Car Racer
- Boys Club
- Bobby Brown
- Breakfast Club
- Budgie
- Jimmy Buffett (from ABC)
- Cindy Bullens (1989 album)
- Blink-182

== C ==
- The Call
- Cambio (MCA Music Philippines)
- Camel
- The Cardigans (US and Canada)
- Belinda Carlisle (US and Canada)
- Tony Carey
- Larry Carlton
- Kim Carnes
- Oliver Cheatham
- Cher (from Kapp)
- Chicosci (MCA Music Philippines)
- The Chipettes
- The Clarks
- Cold Sweat
- Colosseum II
- Common
- Alice Cooper
- Bernadette Cooper
- Bill Cosby
- Cowboy Mouth
- The Cranberries
- Crimson Glory (MCA/Roadrunner)
- The Crusaders (from Blue Thumb)
- The Cuff Links (outside North America)
- Cosmic Slop Shop

== D ==
- Darren Espanto (MCA Music Philippines)
- Darryl Pearson
- Darwin's Waiting Room
- Mac Davis
- TJ Davis (Time Records/MCA)
- The Dawn (MCA Music Philippines)
- Dax Riders (Subscience/MCA)
- Destination (Butterfly)
- Dig
- Dog House
- Donna De Lory
- Lyndsey de Paul
- Kiki Dee (Rocket/MCA) (US/Canada)
- Diamond Head
- Neil Diamond (from Uni)
- Joe Dolce
- DoubleDrive
- Ronnie Dove
- Dream Theater (Mechanic/MCA)
- The Damned
- The Dramatics

== E ==
- E.Y.C.
- Miguel Escueta (MCA Music Philippines)
- Sheena Easton
- Eric B. & Rakim
- E 40

== F ==
- Harold Faltermeyer
- Familiar 48
- Fela Kuti
- Fenix TX (Drive-Thru/MCA)
- Femme Fatale
- Field Mob
- Finch (Drive-Thru/MCA)
- Fine Young Cannibals (IRS/MCA, US and Canada)
- Fist
- The Fixx
- The Floaters (from ABC)
- Flotsam and Jetsam
- Glenn Frey
- Frou Frou
- Pops Fernandez (MCA Music Philippines)

== G ==
- Barry Gibb (US)
- Giuffria (Camel/MCA)
- Genesis (US/Canada)
- Geordie (US/Canada)
- Golden Earring (US/Canada)
- Roland Gift (US/Canada)
- GP Wu
- Gregory Gray
- Mick Greenwood
- Guy (Uptown/MCA)
- Guy Mann-Dude
- GZA (Wu-Tang/MCA)

== H ==
- H_{2}O
- Aaron Hall (Silas/MCA)
- Damion Hall (Silas/MCA)
- Anthony Hamilton (Uptown/MCA)
- Hardline
- Headpins
- Heavy D. & The Boyz (Uptown/MCA)
- Jimi Hendrix
- Carly Hennessey
- His Majesty
- Rupert Holmes (from Infinity)
- The Hooters
- James Horner
- Grayson Hugh

== I ==
- II D Extreme (Gasoline Alley/MCA)
- Immature
- Indecent Obsession
- Iron Butterfly
- Donnie Iris
- IV Xample

== J ==
- J Dilla
- Jetboy
- The Jets
- The Jimi Hendrix Experience
- Jodeci (Uptown/MCA)
- Elton John (US and Canada only, from Uni)
- Holly Johnson
- Steve Jones
- JK Labajo (MCA Music Philippines)
- Julianne (MCA Music Philippines)
- July For Kings
- Justice System

== K ==
- K-Ci & JoJo
- Bert Kaempfert (US and Canada only, from Decca)
- Kansas
- Kardinal Offishall
- Keel (MCA/Gold Mountain)
- Joan Kennedy (Canada only)
- Nik Kershaw
- Kill For Thrills
- B.B. King (from ABC)
- The Kinks
- Klymaxx
- Gladys Knight
- Krokus
- Femi Kuti

== L ==
- Patti LaBelle
- Joey Lawrence (Impact/MCA) (US/Canada)
- Leapy Lee (outside North America)
- Barrington Levy
- Lillian Axe
- Little Milton
- London
- The Look
- Loose Ends (Virgin/MCA)
- Loretta Lynn (MCA Nashville)
- Lord Tracy (MCA/Uni Records)
- Love Club (MCA/Popular Metaphysics)
- Lynyrd Skynyrd
- Lyle Lovett

== M ==
- M (outside the US and Canada)
- The Mac Band
- The Mamas & The Papas
- Barbara Mandrell (MCA Nashville)
- Manitoba's Wild Kingdom (MCA/Popular Metaphysics)
- Jimmy Martin
- Jason McCoy (Canada only)
- Meat Loaf (US and Canada only)
- Glenn Medeiros
- Men Without Hats (Backstreet/MCA) (US)
- Michael Learns To Rock (Impact Music, 1991)
- Midtown (Drive-Thru/MCA)
- Stephanie Mills
- Dannii Minogue
- Mint Royale (US only)
- Bill Monroe
- Chanté Moore (Silas/MCA)
- Gary Moore (outside the US and Canada)
- Alanis Morissette (Canada only)
- Steve Morse
- Musical Youth
- Monique
- Alicia Myers
- Mystikal

== N ==
- Nadine Renee
- New Edition
- New Found Glory (Drive-Thru/MCA)
- New Radicals
- The New Style, would later change their name to Naughty by Nature after leaving MCA
- Olivia Newton-John (US and Canada only, from Uni)
- Ricky Nelson (from Decca)
- Martin Nievera (MCA Music Philippines, now moved to PolyEast Records)
- Night Ranger (Camel/MCA)
- The Nixons
- Nonpoint

== O ==
- Oingo Boingo
- One Way (from ABC)
- The Osborne Brothers
- Osibisa
- The Outfield

== P ==
- Parental Advisory (Savvy/MCA)
- Paparazzi (MCA UK)
- Passionate Friends
- Rahsaan Patterson
- Pebbles
- Perfect Crime
- The Joe Perry Project
- Tom Petty and the Heartbreakers (Backstreet/MCA, from ABC)
- Pitchshifter
- Poco (from ABC)
- Richard Poon (MCA Music Philippines)
- Jesse Powell (Silas/MCA)
- Pretty Boy Floyd
- Puya

== Q ==
- Quartz

== R ==
- Raffi (Troubadour/Shoreline/Rounder/MCA)
- Rare Bird (ABC/Command/Probe, US only)
- Raven-Symoné
- Ready for the World
- Helen Reddy
- Martha Reeves
- Riff Regan
- Cliff Richard (Rocket/MCA, US only)
- Kane Roberts
- The Roots
- Rebekah Ryan

== S ==
- Sabrina (MCA Music Philippines)
- Buffy Sainte-Marie
- Santa Cruz
- Telly Savalas
- Neil Sedaka (Rocket/MCA)
- Andrés Segovia
- Semisonic
- Charlie Sexton
- Shaggy
- Shai
- Cybill Shepherd
- Howard Shore
- Shy (Shy England in U.S.)
- Side A (MCA Music Philippines)
- Patty Smyth
- Phoebe Snow (Shelter/MCA)
- Something Corporate (Drive-Thru/MCA)
- Sonny
- Sonny and Cher
- Soul for Real
- Sound Barrier
- SouthFM
- Sparks
- Spinal Tap
- Spread Eagle
- Spyro Gyra
- Stackridge (from Decca)
- Brenda K. Starr
- Steelheart
- Steely Dan (from ABC)
- Stone Fury
- Sublime (Gasoline Alley/MCA)
- Sweet F.A.

== T ==
- Talib Kweli (Rawkus/MCA)
- Tangerine Dream
- Tanya Markova (MCA Music Philippines)
- Andy Taylor
- Phil Thornalley
- Tiffany
- The Tragically Hip
- Ralph Tresvant
- Triumph
- Trixter (Mechanic/MCA)
- Tanya Tucker
- Twisted Method
- Conway Twitty
- Tygers of Pan Tang

== U ==
- Tracey Ullman (Stiff/MCA) (US/Canada)

== V ==
- Voivod

== W ==
- The Watchmen
- Jody Watley
- Water
- What Is This?
- The Who (US and Canada only, from Decca)
- Whycliffe
- Kim Wilde
- Will and the Kill
- John Williams
- Joseph Williams
- Jackie Wilson (outside North America)
- Vickie Winans
- Wire Train
- Wishbone Ash (from Decca)
- World Entertainment War (MCA/Popular Metaphysics)
- Kitty Wells (from Decca)

== Y ==
- Young Black Teenagers
