= Mark Ridley's Comedy Castle =

Comedy club in Michigan

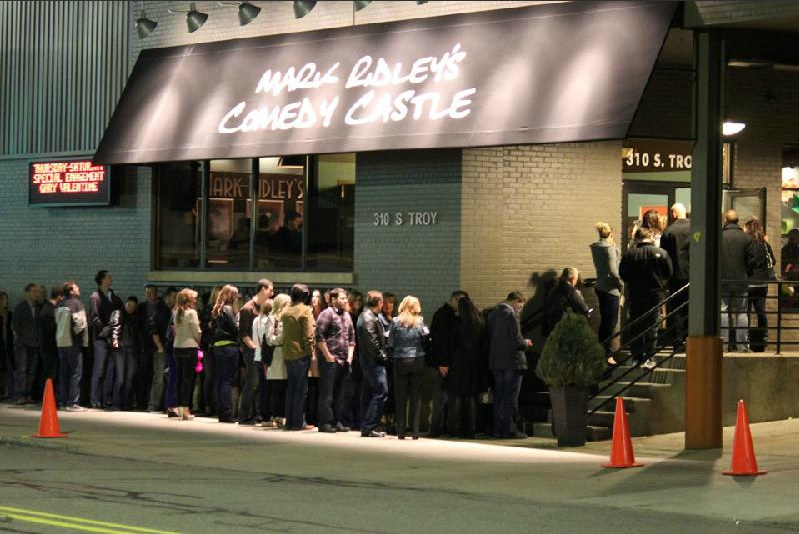
- Comedy Castle in Royal Oak, MI
- Interactive map of Mark Ridley's Comedy Castle
- Address: 310 S. Troy Street
- Location: Royal Oak, Michigan
- Coordinates: 42.4877°N 83.1420°W
- Owner: Mark Ridley
- Capacity: 400
- Type: comedy club

Construction
- Opened: 1979

Website
- www.comedycastle.com

Mark Ridley’s Comedy Castle is a comedy club located in Metro Detroit, at 310 S. Troy St., Royal Oak, Michigan 48067.

== History ==
Mark Ridley first opened the Comedy Castle on January 4, 1979, in the basement of a Bloomfield Hills, Michigan restaurant. Ridley created the three comic set (emcee, feature performer, and headliner) to better organize shows and stage time each night after witnessing an endless line of performers at Los Angeles clubs like The Improv and The Comedy Store, making Mark Ridley’s Comedy Castle one of the first clubs in the nation to do so. During the first 11 years of the club’s existence, it changed locations six times. In 1990, The Comedy Castle established its permanent 400-seat location in Royal Oak. It is the oldest operating comedy club in Michigan.

== Philanthropy ==
Mark Ridley’s Comedy Castle hosts several charitable events for a small fee, allowing organizations to price tickets accordingly for their fundraising. Each year, however, the Comedy Castle donates the room, food from Garden Fresh Salsa, and underwrites performances along with Michigan Financial Companies for The Salvation Army Bed and Bread Club, where they raise around $40,000 each year. Other benefits include the American Cancer Society, Infant Mortality Night, Furniture Bank of Southeastern Michigan, South Oakland Homeless Shelter, Common Ground Shelter, Guardians for Animals, and the Royal Oak Police Officer Association, among many more. All proceeds go to the charities.

== Television ==
The Comedy Castle has hosted several television specials, including Showtime Comedy Club Network, HBO's Comic Relief, A&E's Comedy on the Road with John Byner, and the Comcast Comedy Spotlight. In 1991, Mark Ridley’s Comedy Castle produced and hosted the Emmy Award winning “Funny Side of the Street”, a local variety show featuring Tim Allen.

Mark Ridley’s Comedy Castle promoted the taping of Kathleen Madigan’s 2013 comedy special “Madigan Again”, filmed at the Royal Oak Music Theater.

== Comedy festivals ==
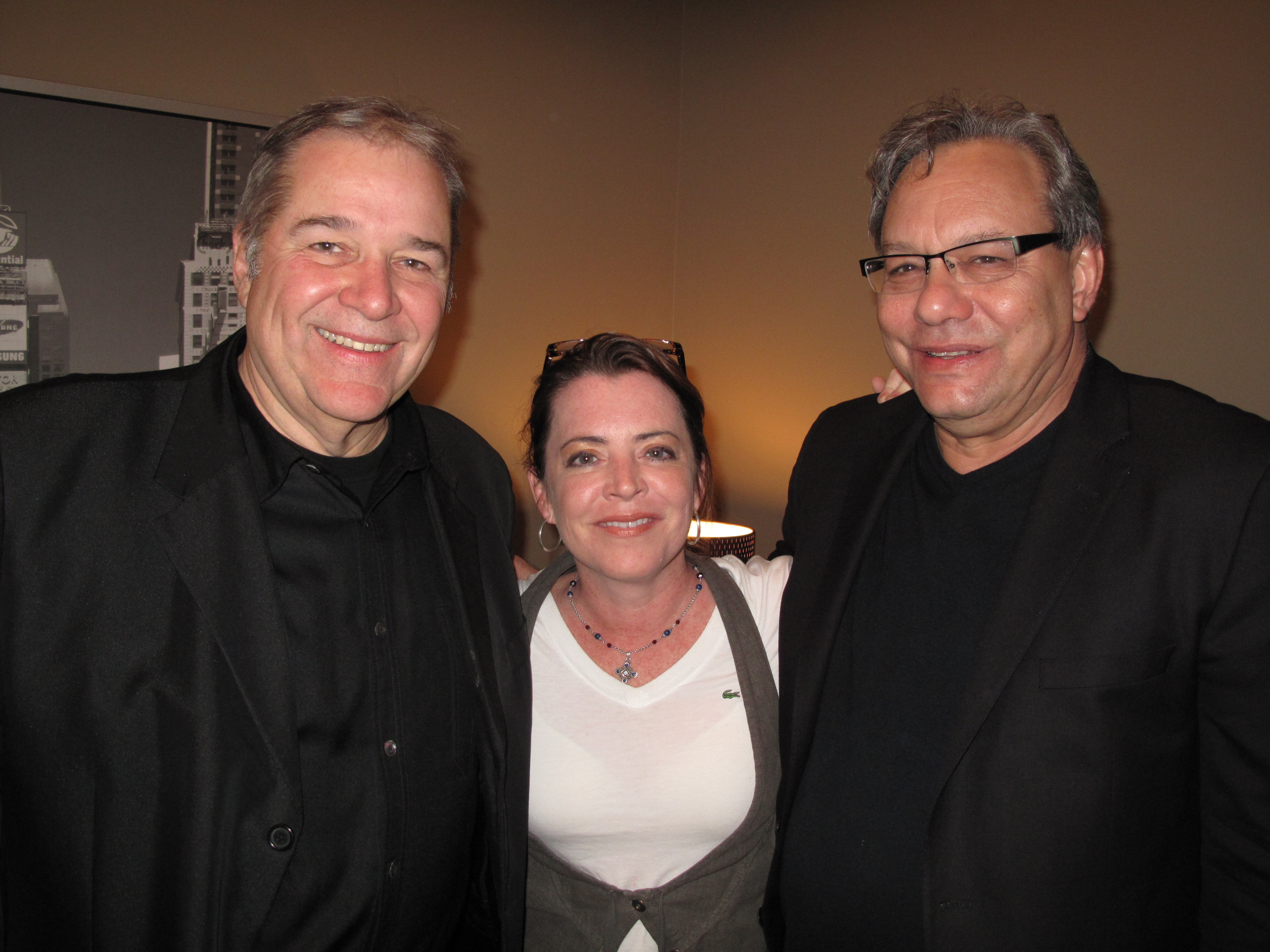
Mark Ridley, Kathleen Madigan, Lewis Black at Mark Ridley's Comedy Castle.

Mark Ridley’s Comedy Castle hosted the first Detroit International Comedy Festival in 2008. The following year, Mark Ridley produced and filmed the Detroit International Comedy Festival for theatrical and home video release. In 2010, Lewis Black emceed and headlined the festival. The Comedy Castle also produced Laugh-a-Palooza each year, featuring many up and coming comedians from around the United States and Canada.

In addition to comedy festivals, Mark Ridley’s Comedy Castle also hosts a stand-up comedy class for those that desire to learn about writing jokes, performing in front of an audience, and working in a club. Local comedian Bill Bushart, who the Metro Times named “Detroit’s Best Comedian 2010,” teaches the class.

== Notable performers ==
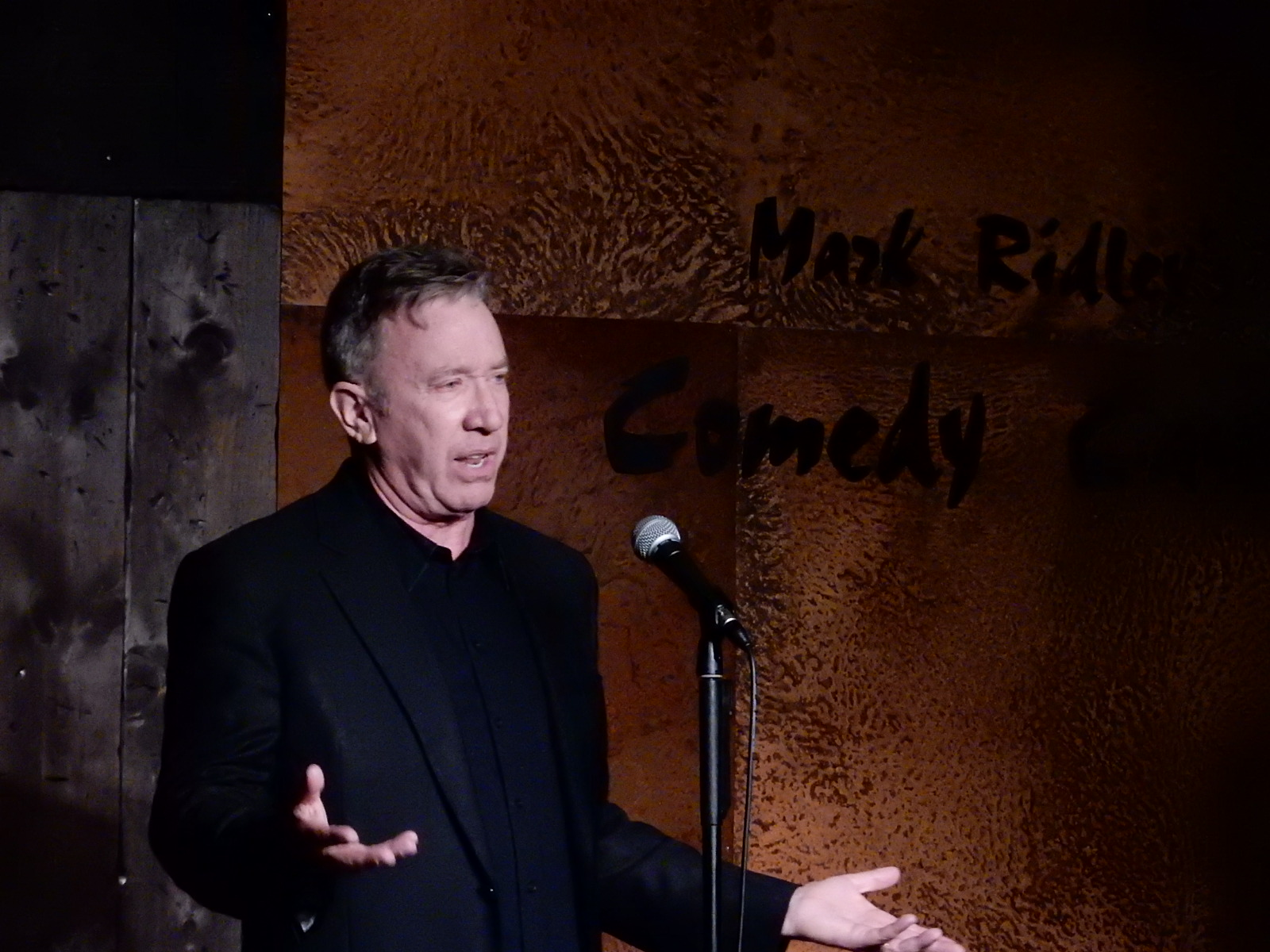
Tim Allen during a surprise set at Mark Ridley's Comedy Castle.

Mark Ridley’s Comedy Castle’s first headliner was Mike Binder, then trying to break out as a stand-up comedian. He was living in Los Angeles at the time and called Mark Ridley to ask if he could be the Comedy Castle’s first headliner. Bob Saget was an early headliner at the Comedy Castle, where he met future Full House co-star Dave Coulier, a Detroit grown comedian and regular headliner.

In 1996, Bill Engvall recorded his debut comedy album “Here’s Your Sign” at the Comedy Castle, followed by his second album “Dorkfish” in 1998. Both albums went platinum.

The only club that comedian Kathleen Madigan will work outside of her normal theater tour is Mark Ridley’s Comedy Castle.

== List of Notable Performers ==
Comedians who have performed in the club include:

- John Heffron
- Adam DeVine
- Bill Engvall
- Bill Farmer
- B. J. Novak
- Bob Saget
- Bobby Lee
- Brody Stevens
- Bryan Callen
- Carlos Mencia
- Chelsea Peretti
- Chris D'Elia
- Colin Kane
- Dave Attell
- Dave Coulier
- David Alan Grier
- Dax Shepard
- Dennis Miller
- Deon Cole
- Dom Irrera
- Dov Davidoff
- Drew Carey
- Drew Lynch
- Eric Andre
- Ellen DeGeneres
- Garry Shandling
- Gerry Bednob
- Godfrey
- Harland Williams
- Iliza Shlesinger
- Jamie Kennedy
- Jay Leno
- J. Chris Newberg
- Jeff Foxworthy
- Jerry Seinfeld
- Jim Breuer
- Jim Carrey
- Joe Rogan
- John Mulaney
- Jon Stewart
- Kathleen Madigan
- Kevin James
- Kevin Nealon
- Lewis Black
- Louie Anderson
- Marc Maron
- Mike Binder
- Paul Feig
- Paul Reiser
- Ralph Garman
- Ralphie May
- Ron White
- Rosie O'Donnell
- Tim Allen
- Mark Normand
- Sam Morill
- Adam Ray
- Michael Kosta
