= What I Need =

What I Need may refer to:

- "What I Need" (Ray J song), 2006
- "What I Need" (Hayley Kiyoko song), 2018
- "What I Need" (Julie Reeves song), 1999
- "Ghetto Day/What I Need", 1994 double single by Crystal Waters
