= Now That's Awesome =

Live album by Bill Engvall
- Released: August 22, 2000
- Recorded: September 15, 1999
- Genre: Comedy
- Length: 48:28
- Label: BNA
- Producer: Doug Grau; J.P. Williams

Bill Engvall chronology
Here's Your Christmas Album (1999)	Now That's Awesome (2000)	Cheap Drunk: An Autobiography (2002)

Now That's Awesome is a 2000 comedy album by comedian Bill Engvall. It was his only release for BNA Records.

The album includes the musical tracks "Now That's Awesome" and "Shoulda Shut Up", with guest vocals from T. Graham Brown, Neal McCoy and Tracy Byrd on the former, and Julie Reeves on the latter. These cuts respectively reached 59 and 71 on the Hot Country Songs charts, although Reeves did not receive chart credit for her song.

Engvall said that he chose to sign to BNA Records due to managerial changes at Warner Bros. He thought that it was "the best comedic album" that he had done.

== Track listing ==
All content written by Bill Engvall; "Now That's Awesome" and "Shoulda Shut Up" co-written by Porter Howell.

1. "Introduction" (0:46)
2. "The 90's" (1:04)
3. "Bar Scene in California" (1:33)
4. "Now That's Awesome" (1:45)
5. "The Dog Had to Be Trained" (2:47)
6. "Pound Puppies" (1:20)
7. "Smoker Aquarium" (1:33)
8. "Pads" (4:34)
9. "When Did Shrapnel Become a Fashion Accessory?" (3:37)
10. "Too Much Information (Cause I'm the Dad)" (4:27)
11. "White Trash Road Race" (4:05)
12. "A Snake in the Toilet" (6:33)
13. "Surfing Lesson" (4:33)
14. "People Amaze Me (Here's Your Sign)" (3:01)
15. "Now That's Awesome" (3:05)
  - featuring Tracy Byrd, Neal McCoy, and T. Graham Brown
16. "Shoulda Shut Up" (Song) (3:45)
  - featuring Julie Reeves

== Chart performance ==
Chart (2000)	Peak position
U.S. Billboard Top Country Albums	14
U.S. Billboard 200	133
