= River Road (band) =

American country music band

- Origin: Louisiana, United States
- Genres: Country
- Years active: 1989–present
- Labels: Capitol; Virgin; Star
- Members: Tony Ardoin; Mike Burch; Steve Grisaffe; Charles Ventre
- Past members: Eddie Bodin; Richard Comeaux

River Road is an American country music band composed of Tony Ardoin (guitar, vocals), Mike Burch (drums, vocals), Richard Comeaux (steel guitar), Steve Grisaffe (lead vocals, bass guitar), and Charles Ventre (keyboards, vocals). Founded in 1989, the band signed to Capitol Records Nashville in 1997, releasing their self-titled debut album that year and charting three singles on the Billboard country charts, including the top 40 hit "Nickajack". By 1998, River Road had transferred to Virgin Records Nashville, charting a fourth single and recording an unreleased album (Somethin' in the Water). Ventre and Grisaffe each began solo careers in the 2000s, but they reunited with Ardoin and Burch in 2011 to release a new extended play.

== History ==
River Road was formed in 1989 in the state of Louisiana by lead singer and bass guitarist Steve Grisaffe, who had previously played in other bands in Louisiana. Completing the original roster were drummer Eddie Bodin (later replaced by Mike Burch), guitarist/vocalist Tony Ardoin, steel guitarist Richard Comeaux, and keyboardist Charles Ventre. In 1991, the band placed second in a National Marlboro Country Music Contest, in addition to touring throughout their native Louisiana. Eventually, they were signed to Capitol Nashville after considering deals with Almo Sounds and Rising Tide Records.

River Road's first album, also titled River Road, was released in 1997. Overall, this album produced three chart singles on the Hot Country Songs charts: "I Broke It, I'll Fix It", "Nickajack" (which entered Top 40), and "Somebody Will". The album was co-produced by Scott Hendricks and Gary Nicholson. Billboard gave "Nickajack" a positive review, saying that it was "crisp and radio-friendly" and "could be the single that helps set this new quintet apart."

When Virgin Records opened its Nashville, Tennessee, division in 1998, River Road was transferred to Virgin Nashville, becoming one of the first three acts signed to that division (the other two being singer Julie Reeves and prank caller Roy D. Mercer). While on Virgin, the band began work on its second studio album (2000's Something in the Water), with its lead-off single "Breathless" charting as well. Virgin Nashville was dissolved by the end of the year, and Somethin' in the Water was never released, although the title track would become a Top 40 hit for its writer, Jeffrey Steele, when he recorded it a year later.

By the end of the year, River Road had disbanded, with both Ventre and Grisaffe pursuing solo careers. Grisaffe released an album titled Current Status in 2001 on an independent label. Ardoin, Burch, Grisaffe, and Ventre reunited in 2011 to release an extended play on the Star Records label.

== River Road (1997) ==
River Road

Studio album by River Road
- Released: June 13, 1997
- Genre: Country
- Length: 33:13
- Label: Capitol Nashville
- Producer: Scott Hendricks; Gary Nicholson

=== Track listing ===
No.	Title	Writer(s)	Length
1.	"Wishful Thinking"	Mike Henderson, Wally Wilson	3:15
2.	"Somebody Will"	Walt Aldridge, Brad Crisler, Steven Dale Jones	2:40
3.	"She Gets to Me"	J. Fred Knobloch, Billy Kirsch	3:32
4.	"Nickajack"	Steve Bogard, Matt Maher, Steve Curnutte	2:52
5.	"I Broke It, I'll Fix It"	Buzz Cason, Byron Hill	3:30
6.	"Only Young Once"	Larry Boone, Paul Nelson	2:51
7.	"Listen to Her Tears"	Terry Burns, Susan Longacre, Stephony Smith	4:12
8.	"Tears to the Tide"	Sarah Beth Hooker, Gary Burr, Gary Nicholson	3:51
9.	"A Day in the Life"	Nicholson, Craig Wiseman	2:55
10.	"As If You Didn't Know"	Donnie Fritts, Nicholson	3:36

=== Personnel ===
As listed in liner notes.

==== River Road ====
- Tony Ardoin – electric guitar, background vocals
- Mike Burch – drums, background vocals
- Richard Comeaux – pedal steel guitar
- Steve Grisaffe – bass guitar, lead vocals
- Charles Ventre – keyboards, background vocals

==== Additional musicians ====
- Bruce Bouton – lap steel guitar
- J. T. Corenflos – electric guitar
- Chad Cromwell – drums
- Larry Franklin – fiddle
- Paul Franklin – pedal steel guitar
- Bob Glaub – bass guitar
- Mike Henderson – electric guitar
- Dann Huff – electric guitar
- John Jorgenson – electric guitar, acoustic guitar, mandolin
- Steve Nathan – piano, Hammond organ, strings
- Michael Spriggs – acoustic guitar

== Singles ==
Year	Single	Peak chart positions		Album
Year	Single	US Country	CAN Country	Album
1997	"I Broke It, I'll Fix It"	48	95	River Road
1997	"Nickajack"	37	27	River Road
1998	"Somebody Will"	51	84	River Road
2000	"Breathless"	45	—	Somethin' in the Water (unreleased)
2001	"'Til Now"	—	—	Somethin' in the Water (unreleased)
2011	"Good Things"	—	—	River Road EP
2011	"Something I Can Wrap My Arms Around"	—	—	River Road EP
"—" denotes releases that did not chart

== Music videos ==
Year	Video	Director
1997	"I Broke It, I'll Fix It"	Martin Kahan
1997	"Nickajack"	Michael Merriman
2000	"Breathless"	Eric Welch
