= Here's Your Sign =

Live album by Bill Engvall
- Released: May 28, 1996
- Recorded: August 28, 1995
- Venue: Mark Ridley's Comedy Castle, Royal Oak, Michigan
- Genre: Comedy
- Length: 53:38
- Label: Warner Bros. Nashville
- Producer: Doug Grau; J.P. Williams

Bill Engvall chronology
Here's Your Sign (1996)	Dorkfish (1998)

Professional ratings
Review scores
Source	Rating
Allmusic	2.5/5 stars

Here's Your Sign is the debut comedy album of Bill Engvall. It was recorded at Mark Ridley's Comedy Castle in Royal Oak, Michigan. Following years of success doing different comedic acts, Engvall released a CD of his material. The album peaked within the top 5 on both the Heatseekers and Hot Country Albums charts, as well as the top 50 on the Billboard 200.

The title of the album refers to a routine framework commonly used by Engvall, which began with his stating that stupid people should have to wear warning signs that simply state "I'm stupid" so that no one will rely on them or ask them anything.

== Track listing ==
All tracks are written by Bill Engvall.

No.	Title	Length
1.	"Introduction"	0:17
2.	"I Love Golf"	3:10
3.	"Going to the Fair"	4:10
4.	"We’ve Got a Full House"	8:26
5.	"Here’s Your Sign"	7:45
6.	"Nobody Disciplines Their Kids Anymore"	5:16
7.	"Things Have Changed"	3:26
8.	"Caught Big Time"	3:23
9.	"I.G. Joe"	5:13
10.	"Baby Barf and the Turkey Hunt"	2:47
11.	"Tell Me What I’m Thinking"	1:28
12.	"Love Magic"	8:17

== Charts ==
=== Weekly charts ===
Chart (1996–1997)	Peak position
US Billboard 200	50
US Top Country Albums (Billboard)	5
US Heatseekers Albums (Billboard)	3

=== Year-end charts ===
Chart (1997)	Position
US Billboard 200	175
US Top Country Albums (Billboard)	20

As of 2014, sales in the United States have exceeded 881,000 copies, according to Nielsen SoundScan.

== Credits ==
- Executive Producer: Bill Engvall
- Producer: Doug Grau and J.P. Williams
- Art Direction by Laura LiPuma
- Design by Laura LiPuma and Garrett Rittenberry
- Digital Editing by Doug Grau and Ronnie Thomas
- Engineered by Donivan Cowart and Martin Cowart
- Mastering by Hank Williams
- Mixed by Donivan Cowart
- Photography by Dean Dixon and Susan Lambeth
- Recorded at Mark Ridley's Comedy Castle in Royal Oak, Michigan
