= Catching Faith =

2015 family drama film

- Directed by: John K.D. Graham
- Based on: The Elijah Project
- Produced by: Alexandra Boylan, John K.D. Graham, Richard W. King, Andrea Polnaszek
- Starring: Bill Engvall, Garrett Weston, Bethany Peterson and Lorena Segura York
- Music by: Benjamin Stanton
- Release date: 2015
- Country: United States
- Language: English

Catching Faith is a 2015 family drama film directed by John K.D. Graham and written by Alexandra Boylan, John K.D. Graham and Andrea Polnaszek. It was filmed in Eau Claire, Wisconsin and Chippewa Falls, Wisconsin. It stars Bill Engvall, Garrett Weston, Bethany Peterson and Lorena Segura York. A small screening was held at Miccon Cinema for a week but was extended to a month due to success of the film, with a small question and answer with stars Bethany Peterson and Garrett Weston after the showing. The film is noted for having over four hundred extras in it.

== Reception ==
Dove.org said "The film features scenes that will encourage viewers to think about integrity and how integrity means doing the right thing even when no one is looking. The film’s ultimate theme is a good one: God is enough. We are pleased to award our “Faith-Friendly” Seal to “Catching Faith.” Common Sense Media rated the film 3 out of 5 stars.
