= It's About Time (Julie Reeves album) =

Studio album by Julie Reeves
- Released: April 20, 1999
- Genre: Country
- Length: 39:15
- Label: Virgin
- Producer: Scott Hendricks; Trey Bruce

It's About Time is the only studio album by American country music artist Julie Reeves, released in 1999 on Virgin Records. "Trouble Is a Woman", "What I Need" and "It's About Time" all charted on Billboard's Hot Country Songs. The album peaked at No. 70 on Billboard's Top Country Albums on April 7, 2000. Reeves was nomination for New Female Vocalist of the Year by the Academy of Country Music Awards in 2000.

Heather Phares of AllMusic writes, "Julie Reeves sweet but gutsy vocals take center stage on her debut album, 1999's It's About Time." Kevin Oliver of Country Standard Time writes, "Reeves is a full-throated 24 year old with the prerequisite supermodel looks of a current female country star. Not just another pretty face, however, she has some serious vocal chops to spare"

== Track listing ==
No.	Title	Writer(s)	Length
1.	"Trouble Is a Woman"	Tim Johnson; David Malloy; Kim Williams	2:22
2.	"Do You Think About Me"	Robin Lee Bruce; Christi Dannemiller	2:40
3.	"Party Down"	Paul Robert Battle; Michael Garvin; Anthony Smith	2:52
4.	"What I Need"	Marv Green	3:07
5.	"All Or Nothing"	Garvin; Michael Salacuse; Steve Siler	2:49
6.	"You Were a Mountain"	Trey Bruce; Max T. Barnes	3:26
7.	"It's About Time"	Ed Hill; Mark D. Sanders	3:33
8.	"If I'd Never Loved You"	Aimee Mayo; Bob Regan	3:51
9.	"Whatever"	Mayo; Chris Lindsey	2:26
10.	"He Keeps Me in One Piece"	Dave Loggins	3:53
11.	"What You Get Is What You See"	Terry Britten; Graham Lyle	3:50
12.	"If Heartaches Had Wings"	Jody Alan Sweet	4:26
Total length:			39:15

- Track information and credits taken from the album's liner notes.

== Charts ==
Chart (1999)	Peak position
US Top Country Albums	70
Canada RPM Country Albums	14

=== Singles ===
Year	Single	Peak chart positions		Album
Year	Single	US Country	CAN Country	Album
1999	"It's About Time"	51	53	It's About Time
1999	"Trouble Is a Woman"	39	57	It's About Time
1999	"What I Need"	38	71	It's About Time
