= Here's Your Christmas Album =

Studio album by Bill Engvall
- Released: September 28, 1999
- Genre: Comedy
- Length: 39:51
- Label: Warner Bros. Nashville
- Producer: Doug Grau, J.P. Williams

Bill Engvall chronology
Dorkfish (1998)	Here's Your Christmas Album (1999)	Now That's Awesome (2000)

Here's Your Christmas Album is a 1999 comedy album by comedian Bill Engvall. It contains original Christmas songs, some with vocals from Engvall and others by studio singers. It was re-released in 2005. The track "Here's Your Sign Christmas" previously appeared on Engvall's album Dorkfish in 1998.

== Critical reception ==
Chuck Donkers of AllMusic wrote, "Engvall has a knack for taking commonly accepted customs and turning them inside out, so that you can see their darker sides, that they can be irritating rather than cheerful."

== Track listing ==
1. "Introduction" - 0:26
2. "I'm Getting Sued by Santa Claus" (Bill Engvall, Craig Hawksley, Porter Howell) - 3:37
3. "Christmas in the Country Holiday" (Engvall, Grau, Justin Peters, Connie Wolfe, Gayle Barnhill) - 3:19
4. "Rudolph Got a DUI" (Engvall, P. Howell) - 2:57
5. "The Christmas Sign" (Engvall, Grau, Peters) - 4:01
6. "A Gift that She Doesn't Want" (Engvall, Grau, Peters) - 4:02
7. "Gift Emergency" (Engvall, Grau, P. Howell, Carol Howell) - 3:28
8. "Fruitcake Makes Me Puke" (Engvall, Hawksley, P. Howell) - 3:49
9. "That's What Wrong with Christmas" (Engvall, Grau, P. Howell) - 4:52
10. "Here's Your Sign Christmas" (Engvall, Grau) - 2:32
11. "The Bike" (Engvall, Grau) - 3:02
12. "Fruitcake Makes Me Puke (Rock Version)" (Engvall, Hawksley, P. Howell) - 3:44

== Personnel ==
Technical

- Lisa Bradley - production assistance
- Bill Engvall - executive producer
- Ted Gainey - recording assistant
- Ray Gordon - photography
- Doug Grau - producer (all tracks), engineering
- Lee Groitzsch - recording
- Tim Hopkins - engineering
- Ken Love - mastering
- Gary Oleyar - engineering
- Toshiaki Kazai - recording assistant
- Garrett Rittenberry - graphic design
- Joey Turner - recording assistant
- Michael White - engineering
- J.P. Williams - producer (all tracks except "Here's Your Sign Christmas")
- Walt Wilkins - engineering
- Brian David Willis - recording, mixing

Musicians

- Greg Barnhill - vocals
- Etta Britt - vocals
- Kelli Bruce - vocals
- Vickie Carrico - vocals
- Mike Chapman - bass guitar
- J.T. Corenflos - acoustic guitar, electric guitar, classical guitar
- Chad Cromwell - drums
- Dillon Dixon - vocals
- John Gardner - drums
- Tony Harrell - piano
- Wes Hightower - vocals
- Porter Howell - acoustic guitar, electric guitar
- Tim Lauer - piano, keyboard, Hammond B-3 organ
- Liana Manis - vocals
- Duncan Mullins - bass guitar
- Steve Nathan - piano, Hammond B-3 organ
- Gary Oleyar - fiddle
- Caryl Mack Parker - vocals
- Al Perkins - pedal steel guitar
- Alison Prestwood - bass guitar
- Milton Sledge - drums
- Frank Vincy - vocals
- Brian David Willis - percussion

== Chart performance ==
Chart (1999)	Peak position
U.S. Billboard Top Country Albums	44
U.S. Billboard Top Holiday Albums	33
