= Rooftop Soundcheck =

Studio album by Justice System
- Released: 1994
- Recorded: April 14–19, 1994
- Studios: Sear Sound, New York City
- Genre: Hip hop
- Length: 56:11
- Label: MCA
- Producer: Jahbaz

Justice System chronology
Rooftop Soundcheck (1994)	Uncharted Terrain (2002)

Rooftop Soundcheck is the debut album by hip hop group Justice System, released in 1994 by MCA Records. It includes tributes to Afrika Bambaataa and Santana. The first single was "Summer in the City".

== Critical reception ==
Professional ratings
Review scores
Source	Rating
AllMusic	3/5 stars
The Charlotte Observer	2/4 stars
RapReviews	8.5/10
The Republican	4/5 stars

The Charlotte Observer noted the "sometimes bland beats and dry raps." Conversely, The Tampa Tribune praised the "fluid rapping and catchy riffs."

== Track listing ==
No.	Title	Length
1.	"Due Our Time"	3:04
2.	"Trouble on My Mind"	6:02
3.	"Flexin' tha Ill Funk"	4:59
4.	"Dedication to Bambaataa"	5:45
5.	"Summer in the City"	5:05
6.	"Santana"	3:20
7.	"The Ill-River Expedition"	4:10
8.	"Justice Funkin'"	4:30
9.	"Jacquelina"	0:36
10.	"Just Because"	4:03
11.	"Soulstyle"	4:57
12.	"Take It to the Stage"	5:34
13.	"Summer in the City" (Sunshine Blend)	3:23
14.	"Jacquelina Outro"	0:43
Total length:		56:11
