= Tony Toliver =

American country music singer (born 1955)

- Born: Charles Anthony Taliaferro; July 4, 1955 (age 70); Richards, Texas
- Genres: Country
- Instruments: Vocals, piano
- Years active: 1991–1997
- Labels: Curb; Rising Tide

Charles Anthony Taliaferro (born July 4, 1955 in Richards, Texas) is an American country music singer.

Taliaferro began playing bass guitar in his family's gospel group, but later began playing piano. He moved to Nashville, Tennessee at age 25 and held day jobs, until he was discovered by singer Dottie West. West hired him and had him as her pianist and bandleader, with his first gig occurring at the White House.

Taliaferro continued to tour with his bandmates, The Lloyds, after West died in 1991, and released a self-titled debut album through Curb Records the same year. Six years later, he released a second album, Half Saint, Half Sinner through Rising Tide Records. This album included two singles that made the Hot Country Songs charts: "Bettin' Forever on You" and "He's on the Way Home".

== Discography ==
=== Studio albums ===
Title	Album details
Tony Toliver	Release date: April 9, 1991; Label: Curb Records
Half Saint, Half Sinner	Release date: September 24, 1996; Label: Rising Tide Records

=== Singles ===
Year	Single	Peak positions	Album
Year	Single	US Country	Album
1990	"Bar Stool Fool"	—	Tony Toliver
1996	"Bettin' Forever on You"	71	Half Saint, Half Sinner
1997	"He's on the Way Home"	67	Half Saint, Half Sinner
"—" denotes releases that did not chart

=== Music videos ===
Year	Single	Director
1990	"Bar Stool Fool"	Greg Crutcher
1996	"Bettin' Forever on You"	Marc Ball
