= Virgin Records =

British record label

Virgin Records Ltd
- Parent company: Universal Music Group (2012–present); Previously; Thorn EMI (1992–1996); EMI (1996–2012); Warner Music Group (2013–present; European back catalogue except for UK)
- Founded: Virgin Records Ltd.; 1972; 54 years ago; Virgin France SA; 1980; 46 years ago; Virgin Records America, Inc.; 1986; 40 years ago
- Founder: Richard Branson; Simon Draper; Nik Powell; Tom Newman
- Defunct: 2013; 13 years ago (original, United Kingdom/British branch)
- Distributors: EMI (United Kingdom); Virgin Music Group (US and selected territories); Universal Music Group (outside the UK, the US and selected territories)
- Genre: Various
- Country of origin: United Kingdom

Virgin Records is a British record label owned by Universal Music Group. They were originally founded as a British independent record label in 1972 by entrepreneurs Richard Branson, Simon Draper, Nik Powell, and musician Tom Newman. They grew to be a worldwide success over time, meaning that by the time it was sold, it was regarded as a major label, alongside other large international independents such as A&M and Island Records.

Virgin Records was sold to Thorn EMI in 1992. EMI would later be acquired by Universal Music Group (UMG) in 2012 with UMG creating the Virgin EMI Records division. The Virgin Records name continued to be used in Germany until 2025, when it was renamed Intercord Records.

== Virgin Records America ==
Virgin Records America, Inc. was the company's North American operations founded in 1986. The label was originally headquartered in Beverly Hills, California from 1986 to 2002 and then moved to New York City where it was headquartered there from 2003 to 2012. They are no longer active and were headquartered in Hollywood, California, and operated under the Capitol Music Group imprint, now also owned by UMG, since 2012. The US operations had also taken on the name Virgin Records. A minor number of artists remained on Virgin Records America's roster, which was mostly occupied with European artists such as Bastille, Barbara Pravi, Circa Waves, Corinne Bailey Rae, Ella Eyre, Grizfolk, Walking on Cars, Seinabo Sey, and Prides; American artists include Knox Hamilton, L'Tric, Loren Gray, and Rise Against.

== Virgin Classics ==
Virgin Classics was founded in 1988 as part of Virgin Records. Along with EMI Classics, it too was acquired by UMG in 2012 as part of the takeover of the EMI Group. But the terms of the European Commission's approval of the takeover required divestment of the two classical labels. Accordingly, both were sold in February the following year to Warner Music Group, and this transaction was approved by the European Union that May. Warner placed the Virgin Classics artist roster and catalogue in its Erato Records division, and the "Virgin Classics" name, along with "EMI Classics", disappeared.

== History ==
Virgin logo designed by Roger Dean for the fledgling Virgin Records label

Branson and Powell had initially run a small record shop called Virgin Records and Tapes on Notting Hill Gate, London, specializing in krautrock imports, and offering bean bags and free vegetarian food for the benefit of customers listening to the music on offer. The first real store was above a shoe shop at the Tottenham Court Road end of Oxford Street. The name Virgin, according to Branson (in his autobiography), arose from Tessa Watts, a colleague of his, when they were brainstorming business ideas. She suggested Virgin – as they were all new to business – like "virgins".

After making the shop into a success, they turned their business into a fully fledged record label. The original Virgin logo (known to fans as the "Gemini" or "Twins" logo) was designed by English artist and illustrator Roger Dean: a young naked woman in mirror image with a large long-tailed lizard and the word "Virgin" in Dean's familiar script. A variation on the logo was used for the spin-off Caroline Records label.

The first release on the label was the progressive rock album Tubular Bells by multi-instrumentalist Mike Oldfield, who was discovered by Tom Newman and brought to Simon Draper – who eventually persuaded Richard and Nik to present it as their first release in 1973, produced by Tom Newman, for which the fledgling label garnered unprecedented acclaim. This was soon followed by some notable krautrock releases, including electronic breakthrough album Phaedra by Tangerine Dream (which went Top 20), and The Faust Tapes and Faust IV by Faust. The Faust Tapes album retailed for 49p (the price of a 7" single) and as a result allowed this relatively unknown band a massive audience as the album sold over 60,000 copies and also reached number 12 in the charts, though it was later redacted its spot on the grounds of the cover price. Other early albums include Gong's Flying Teapot (Radio Gnome Invisible, Pt. 1), which Daevid Allen has been quoted as having never been paid for.

The first single release for the label was Kevin Coyne's "Marlene" (b/w "Everybody Says"), taken from his album Marjory Razorblade and released in August 1973. Coyne was the second artist signed to the label after Oldfield.

=== Rebranding ===
Although Virgin was initially one of the key labels of English and European progressive rock, the 1977 signing of the Sex Pistols (who had already been signed and then dropped by both EMI and A&M) reinvented the label PM in a new-wave outpost, a move that plunged the record company into the mainstream of the punk rock era. Under the guidance of Tessa Watts, Virgin's Head of Publicity (and later, also Director of Production), the Pistols rocketed the label to success. Shortly afterwards, police raided the Nottingham record shop for having a window display of the Sex Pistols' album Never Mind the Bollocks, Here's the Sex Pistols in the window. Afterwards the label signed other new wave groups: Public Image Ltd, Boxer, Culture Club, Fingerprintz, Gillan, Holly and the Italians, The Human League (whose "Don't You Want Me" was the label's first chart-topping single, in 1981), Magazine, Skids, the Motors, Penetration, the Ruts, Shooting Star, Simple Minds, and XTC.

After modified versions of the twins label came the red, white and blue design introduced in 1975, which coincided with the height of punk and new wave. The current Virgin logo (known informally as "the scrawl") was created in 1978, commissioned by Simon Draper, then managing director of Virgin Records Limited. Brian Cooke of Cooke Key Associates commissioned a graphic designer to produce a stylised signature. The logo was first used on Mike Oldfield's Incantations album in 1978 and by the Virgin Records label exclusively until gradually other parts of the Virgin Group adopted it, including Virgin Atlantic, Virgin Mobile and Virgin Money.

=== Purchase by Thorn EMI ===
Virgin Records was sold by Branson to Thorn EMI in June 1992 for a reported US$1 billion (around £560 million) (equivalent to $2.294285037×10^{9} in 2025), with a special non-competition clause that would prevent Branson from founding another recording company during the five years following the agreement (see the final paragraph in EU Merger Decision IV/M202 of 27 April 1992). It now faces competition from Branson's new label: V2 Records. Branson sold Virgin Records to fund Virgin Atlantic, which at that time was coming under intense anti-competitive pressure from British Airways. In 1993, BA settled a libel action brought by Branson over BA's "dirty tricks" campaign, giving him £500,000 and a further £110,000 to his airline.

After being acquired by Thorn EMI, Virgin launched several subsidiaries like Realworld Records, Innocent Records, blues speciality label Pointblank Records, and indie music label Hut Recordings, and continued signing new and established artists like Lenny Kravitz, Korn, A Fine Frenzy, Thirty Seconds to Mars, Tina Turner, Beenie Man, The Rolling Stones, Spice Girls, The Smashing Pumpkins, We Are Scientists, The Kooks, dcTalk (mainstream releases, contract ended in 2000), Belinda Carlisle, Meat Loaf, Placebo, Janet Jackson (contract ended in 2006), Daft Punk (contract ended in 2008), My Favorite Highway, Does It Offend You, Yeah?, The Future Sound of London, The Chemical Brothers, Brooke Allison, The Red Jumpsuit Apparatus, The Almost, Mariah Carey (contract ended in 2002), N.E.R.D, Laura Marling, Swami, RBD, Thalía, Priscilla Renea, Neneh Cherry, After 7, Soul II Soul, Steve Winwood, Body Count and Johnny Hates Jazz.

Because business models increasingly diverged, Thorn EMI shareholders voted in favour of demerger proposals on 16 August 1996. The resulting media company became the EMI Group. In 1997, Virgin absorbed the remainder of EMI USA, which earlier consolidated EMI America Records and Manhattan Records, with Capitol Records acquiring EMI's other American operations, and in 1998, opened a country music division called Virgin Records Nashville, of which record producer Scott Hendricks was president. The label's signees comprised Julie Reeves, Jerry Kilgore, Roy D. Mercer, Tom Mabe, Chris Cagle, Clay Davidson, and River Road. In 2001, Virgin Nashville closed and its roster was folded into Capitol Records' Nashville division.

=== Further mergers ===
Capitol Records and Virgin Records America merged in 2007 to form Capitol Music Group after a massive restructuring of EMI Group Ltd. Stepping down as chief executive of Capitol Records was Andy Slater, with Jason Flom, former executive of Virgin, taking the reins as chairman and CEO of the newly created company.

Universal Music Group (UMG) purchased EMI in 2012, thus acquiring Virgin. UMG absorbed Virgin's UK operations to create Virgin EMI Records in March 2013.

On 16 June 2020, Universal rebranded Virgin EMI Records as EMI Records and named Rebecca Allen (former president of UMG's Decca label) as the label's president, with Virgin Records now operating as an imprint of latter label.

In February 2021, the Universal Music Group announced that it would rebrand the Caroline Music Group as Virgin Music Label & Artist Services. The name change was "inspired and influenced by the spirit and ethos of the iconic Virgin Records label". In September 2022, UMG consolidated Virgin Music Label & Artist Services, Ingrooves Music Group, and the recently acquired mtheory Artist Partnerships as part of the newly launched division Virgin Music Group. UMG also appointed mtheory founders JT Myers and Nat Pastor as co-CEOs of the new division.

== American editions ==
The Virgin label was distributed in the US by Atlantic from 1973 to 1975. During this period, 14 albums were issued. All had been previously issued in the UK on Virgin, although one album, Marjory Razorblade by Kevin Coyne, was truncated from a 20-song double album to an 11-song single album.

Beginning with Mike Oldfield's Ommadawn album in 1975, American distribution switched to CBS Records/Columbia Records. CBS/Columbia was unwilling to release all Virgin artists, so many were licensed to other labels:

- Epic (the sister company of Columbia): Mike Oldfield (1980s releases), Captain Beefheart (1982's Ice Cream for Crow), Culture Club (1982–1986), Holly and the Italians, some XTC (1982's English Settlement), and Shooting Star
- Atlantic: Julian Lennon, Genesis (previously on Charisma Records), Phil Collins, Captain Beefheart (1980's Doc at the Radar Station, pressing and distribution)
- A&M: UB40, The Human League, Simple Minds, Breathe, Orchestral Manoeuvres in the Dark, Feargal Sharkey and The Blue Nile
- Warner Bros.: Sex Pistols, Scritti Politti, Devo, China Crisis, Public Image Ltd. (1978 to 1981)
- Geffen: XTC (1983 on), It Bites, Peter Gabriel
- MCA: Belinda Carlisle, Loose Ends, 52nd Street, Merry Christmas Mr. Lawrence by Ryuichi Sakamoto
- Elektra: Public Image Ltd. (1984 to 1986)
- RCA: 1984 (For the Love of Big Brother) by Eurythmics; the band were signed to RCA, but produced the soundtrack on commission from Virgin
- Arista: Heaven 17, Jermaine Stewart

Some of these records had a small Virgin logo added to the regular company design on the label. One of Virgin's and Epic's biggest acts of the 1980s was Culture Club.

In 1978, Virgin set up US operations first in New York on Perry Street, with distribution from Atlantic Records. Virgin Records soon moved operations to New Jersey along with a short-lived subdivision called Virgin International, handled by independent New Jersey–based distributor Jem Records. Virgin International was used mainly for progressive rock artists and reissues of earlier Virgin / Atlantic albums such as Hergest Ridge by Mike Oldfield, and Fish Rising by Steve Hillage, which Columbia chose not to reissue. Virgin International also issued albums by some of Virgin's reggae artists, including Gregory Isaacs. At the same time, Virgin releases distributed by Columbia continued, distribution returning to Atlantic (later WEA) in 1980, at which time Virgin International ceased operations.

In 1986, Virgin Records opened up another American division, Virgin Records America, Inc.. Its first release was the debut album by Cutting Crew, which included the hit single "(I Just) Died in Your Arms". Other Virgin America signings included Camper Van Beethoven, Bob Mould, Warren Zevon, Paula Abdul, T'pau, Ziggy Marley and the Melody Makers, Redhead Kingpin & The F.B.I., Neneh Cherry, Steve Winwood, Hindsight and, after her MCA contract ran out in 1991, Belinda Carlisle. Virgin Records America's releases were distributed through WEA again by Atlantic Records until 1992. The label was then acquired by EMI-Capitol Special Markets. In 1996, Virgin Records offered Janet Jackson one of the best and highest deals at the time estimating an $80 million deal. The agreement also required Virgin to allocate about $25 million in video production, marketing and promotion costs – a much larger sum than most deals. Virgin Records America was founded by the executive team of Jordan Harris, Jeff Ayeroff and Phil Quartararo.

Another American company called Caroline Records co-existed during this time. Caroline records rarely mentioned a connection with Virgin, and some UK and European Virgin albums that were distributed internationally (instead of being manufactured in each country) named Caroline as its American distributor. Some Caroline records bore the label name Caroline Blue Plate, which was mainly used for reissuing on CD many early progressive rock albums and artists from Virgin and Caroline's UK branches.

== Canadian editions ==
The first Canadian editions were distributed by WEA, and were parallel issues of the same early 14 albums issued in the US by Virgin/Atlantic.

In 1975, distribution transferred to Columbia (as it had in the US), but the following year distribution was transferred again to Polydor Records (which changed its name to PolyGram by 1980), and issued a different and larger selection of records from what was being issued in the US. Canadian editions of the Dindisc label were issued as Dindisc/Virgin. Virgin's Canadian division arranged to have Canadian artists Martha & the Muffins and Nash the Slash signed to Dindisc in the UK as well; both artists had releases in Canada and the UK on Dindisc.

In 1983, an independent Virgin Records Canada Inc. company was created, three years before a similar move occurred in the US. From this time onward, Virgin Canada used unique label designs not seen in other countries: a red label with five horizontal bars across the top and an extra-large "scrawl" logo from 1983 to 1985, followed by a purple label with round logo up to 1992 when Virgin was acquired internationally.

== Virgin Music Publishers ==
Soon after Virgin Records was founded, the label created a music publisher for its artists who also served as songwriters. Starting in the 1980s, Virgin Music signed songwriters from other record labels. After Virgin was acquired by EMI, the publisher was folded into EMI Music Publishing as EMI Virgin Music.

In 2012, a consortium led by Sony/ATV Music Publishing acquired EMI Music Publishing for $2.2 billion. However, the European Union ruled that Sony/ATV would represent over half of all the charting hits in the United Kingdom, and required the company to auction off Virgin Music and Famous Music UK, as well as twelve unrelated authors.

In December 2012, BMG Rights Management acquired the Virgin and Famous publishers, and concluded the deal in May 2013. Virgin Music was renamed BMG VM Music, while Famous Music became BMG FM Music.

Before its demise, Virgin Music's songwriters included Iggy Pop, Texas, Ozzy Osbourne, Cannibal Corpse, Nirvana, Winger, Wax, Tears for Fears, The Prodigy, Goo Goo Dolls, Tool, The Crystal Method, Terence Trent D'Arby, Lenny Kravitz, Ben Harper, Warrant, Mark Ronson, Devo, Culture Club, Take That, Bullet for My Valentine, Robbie Williams, Wayne Hector, Orchestral Manoeuvres in the Dark, and XTC.

== Subsidiary labels ==
- In 1983 Virgin purchased Charisma Records, renaming it Charisma/Virgin, then later Virgin/Charisma, before folding the label in 1986 and transferring its remaining artists to Virgin. In the process it acquired Genesis and comedy group Monty Python. The Charisma label was reactivated in the US in 1990 and enjoyed success with signings such as Maxi Priest, 38 Special and Enigma. When this Charisma label was retired in 1992, most of its artists were, as before, transferred to Virgin.
- E.G. Records, an artist management company and independent record label, mostly active during the 1970s and 1980s, was acquired by Virgin in the late-80s after its owners' failed investments left the company in financial problems. Virgin renamed the label as Virgin EG Records for a brief time until its dissolving after EMI's acquisition. Robert Fripp and his band King Crimson had an extensive legal battle with EG that ended with Fripp taking both band and solo catalogues with him to form his own company Discipline Global Mobile, whose releases, mostly catalogue reissues, were licensed to Virgin until going full independent.
- In 1987, Venture Records was created for new age and modern classical artists including Klaus Schulze, who had been associated with Virgin since the early 1970s. (Virgin had distributed UK editions of his German albums since 1974, and he had almost been signed as a Virgin artist in 1976, but the deal was cancelled after a conflict between Virgin and his German label.)
- 10 Records was sometimes branded as Ten, and was part of AVL (Associated Virgin Labels Limited – a marketing company owned by Virgin Records Ltd).
- Siren Records was another 1980s label which became part of AVL.
- Circa Records was another 1980s AVL label, though one which became Virgin's 'strategic marketing' division making TV-advertised compilations such as The Best...Album in the World...Ever! collections under the label name Virgin TV or EMI/Virgin TV.
- Immortal Records
- Caroline Records was a budget label used from 1973 to 1977. The name and logo were later used for some American editions of Virgin records in the 1980s and 1990s. Caroline was primarily used for independent distribution until the label was reactivated in 2013. Today, Caroline Records acts as an independent label taking the place of EMI Label Services, after Virgin's former parent company EMI was purchased by Universal Music Group.
- Front Line Records (or Virgin's Front Line) was a label for issuing Jamaican and English reggae music from 1978 to approximately 1987. It became an actual label name in 1978 when it succeeded a category of Virgin albums and singles marketed as "The Front line Series" which went back to 1976, when a reggae compilation album titled The Front Line was issued on Virgin. Front Line artists included U-Roy, U Brown, Mighty Diamonds, Keith Hudson, Althea & Donna, Jah Lloyd, Johnny Clarke, The Gladiators, Peter Tosh, I-Roy, Tapper Zukie, Sly Dunbar, Twinkle Brothers, Prince Far I, Big Youth, The Abyssinians, Culture, Gregory Isaacs and Linton Kwesi Johnson.
- A short-lived associated label, Dindisc, had Orchestral Manoeuvres in the Dark and The Monochrome Set during its brief existence (1980–1981), after which its recordings became part of Virgin's catalogue.
- Noo Trybe Records was a hip-hop record label that existed from 1994 to 1999. The label consisted of mostly West Coast hip-hop artists such as the Luniz. The label also became the distributor for releases under Rap-A-Lot Records after they switched distribution from Virgin's sister label under EMI, Priority Records in 1994. Noo Trybe also became the home of East Coast rappers AZ and Gang Starr after their respective labels EMI and Chrysalis were folded in early 1997.
- Delabel was one of the main imprints of the French division of EMI, along with Virgin Music, Hostille, Blue Note France and Labels. Delabel had a publishing company and a record label. It existed until 2012 when EMI broke up, and EMI Music France was sold to Warner Music Group (along with Parlophone and other EMI divisions) and renamed Parlophone Music France. The publishing company of Delabel is now owned by Sony/ATV Music Publishing (which acquired EMI Music Publishing); meanwhile, the label catalogue now belongs to the new division Parlophone Music France, from Warner Music Group. It signed with Mathieu Chedid, Daft Punk, Tonton David and others, It also distributed The Prodigy's releases in France from 1993 to 2006.

== Virgin Music international companies ==
- EMI Records (formerly Virgin EMI Records) is Universal's main label in the United Kingdom after Mercury Records UK has been reduced to a local Universal imprint and its artist moved to the new Virgin EMI label. In 2020, Virgin EMI was rebranded as EMI Records, but the Virgin brand remained an imprint of the newly rebranded unit.
- Virgin Schallplatten GmbH was the German subsidiary of Virgin Records. It was consolidated into EMI Germany (which is now part of Universal Music Germany).
- The Dutch branch of Virgin became independent from (then) parent company Ariola in 1984, although Ariola kept distributing and marketing Virgin's output until it was taken over by EMI in the early 1990s (which also meant the end of Virgin's independent status in the Netherlands). In the late 1990s Virgin launched the Top Notch label, which became famous for its Dutch hip-hop and rap artists. With Universal's acquisition of EMI in 2012, Virgin became part of the Universal Music Group Netherlands.
- Virgin France SA was founded in 1980 and was the first international division of Virgin Records. In 2002 it merged with EMI Music France and continued as an imprint, until it was consolidated into EMI France, which has been renamed Parlophone and sold to Warner Music Group, just like the divisions in Belgium, Czech Republic, Denmark, Norway, Poland, Portugal, Spain, Slovakia and Sweden. Universal (who retained Virgin's trademark in France) would later revive Virgin France as an imprint of Mercury Records' French division in 2016; its first artist, Etienne Daho, was one of Virgin France's biggest artists before Warner's acquisition.
- Virgin Japan has had three incarnations:
  - The first was founded in 1987, Virgin Japan, as a wholly owned Virgin subsidiary. In 1989, following the investment by the Fujisankei Communications Group in Virgin Records, a new Virgin Japan company was established focused on domestic repertoire and run by Pony Canyon, the record company of Fujisankei. After EMI's purchase of Virgin in 1992, this incarnation of Virgin Japan was renamed Media Remoras, and it closed in 1997.
  - The second incarnation was part of Toshiba-EMI, and had three sublabels: Virgin Domestic, Virgin Tokyo, and Virgin DCT (exclusive to releases from the band Dreams Come True). All three were folded in 2004 into the label Virgin Music, which was folded into EMI Records Japan in 2013 after its merger with Universal. However, international Virgin releases were previously handled in Japan by Toshiba-EMI themselves prior to the 1987 establishment of the first incarnation of Virgin Japan.
  - The third incarnation, Virgin Music (JPN), was established as a sublabel in 2014 following the merge of EMI R and Delicious Deli Records. Delicious Deli later became an imprint of Virgin Music alongside a new imprint, Virgin Records. In 2017, both imprints ceased operations and all artists under the two imprints were placed under the main Virgin Music label.
- The Brazilian division of Virgin started in 1996 by EMI Music Brasil with artistic direction by Rick Bonadio, with artists like Surto, Charlie Brown Jr. and Tihuana, and existed from 1996 to 2001, when it was absorbed by EMI, and in 2012 by Universal.

== See also ==
- Lists of record labels
- List of Virgin Records artists
