= Beijing Spring (band) =

English pop duo

- Origin: Sussex, England
- Genres: Pop
- Years active: 1991–1993
- Labels: MCA
- Past members: Sian Russell; Katrina Stevens

Beijing Spring was an English pop duo formed in 1991, and subsequently signed by Joe Cokell, general manager of marketing at MCA Records in June 1991. As reported by The Times, the deal was £4m over five years. That figure includes £400,000 forwarded to the Sussex based duo when the deal was closed in June 1991. It does not include the £200,000 reportedly being lavished on the promotion of their single, "I Wanna Be in Love Again". The group composed of the singers, Sian Russell and Katrina Stevens.

The group was launched when Tony Williams, Gordon MacKay and Allan Wiseman decided to indulge their songwriting hobby by making demo tapes of some of their tunes. They hired Russell and Stevens to sing on the demos, the intention being to try to sell the songs to major artists. Russell and Stevens, who had not previously worked together, liked the songs enough to persuade Williams/MacKay/Wiseman to let them "keep them". Beijing Spring was thus born.

The group played at its first gig in late 1992 as special guests on the Curtis Stigers and Richard Marx tours. They failed to achieve mainstream success however, with just three minor hits on the UK Singles Chart.

== Discography ==
- "We Can Keep This Together" (1992) No. 87
- "I Wanna Be in Love Again" (1993) UK No. 43
- "Summerlands" (1993) UK No. 53
