= Tom Mabe =

American comedian

- Occupations: Comedian; YouTuber; prankster

YouTube information
- Channel: MabeInAmerica
- Years active: 2009–present
- Genres: Comedy; pranks
- Subscribers: 948 thousand
- Views: 236 million
- Last updated: October 21, 2025
- Website: www.tommabe.com

Tom Mabe is an American comedian, YouTuber, prankster, and jingle writer.

== Career ==
Mabe, based in Louisville, Kentucky, achieved notability with his prank responses to telemarketing calls. Upon receiving an unsolicited call, Mabe would engage telemarketers in an unexpected and often uncomfortable conversation while recording the incident. One of his best known pranks of this genre involved convincing a telemarketer that he had inadvertently called the scene of a homicide. He has been featured on Drew & Mike in the Morning on WRIF numerous times and has released three comedy albums of his calls through Virgin Records Nashville. Mabe now operates a YouTube channel entitled "MabeInAmerica" onto which he uploads his pranks. His exploits now primarily focus on the candid camera style of pranking, although telemarketing related and other prank calls are still included on occasion. In 2008, Mabe was the Executive Producer, writer, and talent for the CMT (Country Music Television) comedy series, Mabe In America. Six episodes have been produced, including two "best of" shows that showcase his most popular features. He appeared in the second episode of CMT Comedy Stage.

Mabe also performs as a standup comedian. The current center of focus of his acts generally revolves around issues that Americans tend to find annoying including email spam, bad customer service, and high gas prices.

In December 2013, Mabe created a prank video, intended to discourage driving under the influence, in which he and several accomplices convinced a mutual friend with a history of multiple DUIs that he had just awoken from a 10-year coma resulting from a drunk driving crash. It became a viral video, earning over 28 million views on YouTube by October 2017.

== Discography ==
- Revenge on the Telemarketers (1997)
- Revenge on the Telemarketers: Round One (2000)
- Revenge on the Telemarketers: Round Two (2000)
- A Wake Up Call for Telemarketers (2003)
- Mabe In America (2006)
- King of the Ring (2011)
