= Rising Tide Records =

American record label

- Founded: 1995
- Founder: Doug Morris, Daniel Glass
- Status: defunct
- Genre: Country, pop
- Country of origin: United States

Rising Tide Records was a record label started by Doug Morris, former head of Warner Music Group, and Daniel Glass, who became president.

The label had success in breaking new artists, including the multi-platinum debut of Erykah Badu, Billie Myers and Lost Boyz. Recognizing the changing landscape of the industry, Glass strategically aligned Universal with such independent record labels as Kedar Entertainment, home to Erykah Badu, and Mojo Records, home to platinum artist Reel Big Fish and the Cherry Poppin' Daddies.

In 1995, it was founded as Rising Tide Records and shortly thereafter, it was renamed Universal Records and Doug Morris was named Chairman/C.E.O. of MCA Music Entertainment Group. However, the Nashville branch stayed active until March 1998. Acts on the Nashville branch included Matraca Berg, Scotty Emerick, The Buffalo Club, Rebecca Lynn Howard, J.C. Jones, Nitty Gritty Dirt Band, Delbert McClinton, Tony Toliver, Jack Ingram, Dolly Parton, Kris Tyler and Keith Sewell.

== See also ==
- List of record labels
