= Justice System (group) =

American hip hop group

- Genres: Hip hop, jazz rap
- Years active: 1990–present
- Labels: MCA Records, Ill River Muzic
- Members: Bim-E; Coz Boogie; Eric G; Folex; Jahbaz; Mo' Beta Al; Sugadeezil; Wizard C Rock

Justice System is an American hip hop group from New York City, New York, best known for their up-tempo brand of jazz rap and most significant for their 1994 release on MCA Records, Rooftop Soundcheck.

== Biography ==
Formed in 1990, Justice System began playing at high school talent shows and small clubs in the Westchester, NY area. Justice System recorded their first demos at Power Play Studios in Queens where hip hop artists Eric B & Rakim and EPMD also recorded. By 1992 the band was performing alongside De La Soul and Run-DMC. The band signed with MCA Records in 1993 and completed recording of their debut album Rooftop Soundcheck in April 1994. The album released later that year and was met with praise from the community. In late 1996 Justice System asked to be released from their contract with MCA Records. Subsequently, they would go on to found their own independent label, Ill River Muzic in 1998. Five years later, the band released their second studio album, Uncharted Terrain, on Ill River Muzic in 2002. In 2003 they followed up with Mobilization. It featured a remix of the debut single from Rooftop Soundcheck called Summer in the City. Physical copies of the album were only released in Japan. After a nearly sixteen year hiatus, Justice System returned in 2019 with a fourth studio album titled Basement Tapes. In 2022, they released their fifth album titled Quantum Field Crew.

== Discography ==
- Rooftop Soundcheck (1994)
- Uncharted Terrain (2002)
- Mobilization (2003)
- Basement Tapes (2019)
- Quantum Field Crew (2022)
