= J.C. Jones =

American singer-songwriter

- Born: 1973 (age 52–53)
- Origin: Los Angeles, California, United States
- Genres: Country
- Occupation: Singer
- Instrument: Vocals
- Years active: 1997–1998
- Label: Rising Tide

J.C. Jones (born 1973) is an American country music artist. Jones was signed to a recording deal with Rising Tide Records and released his debut album, One Night, in 1998. His only single, the album's title track, peaked at No. 61 on the Billboard Hot Country Singles & Tracks chart. When Rising Tide closed in March 1998, he no longer had a record label deal.

The "One Night" single was produced by Emory Gordy Jr. and Steve Fishell, and written by Lewis Storey, Rick Carnes, and Janis Carnes. Billboard Singles review said "the melody was pretty… an appealing Mexicali flavor… delicate guitar intro" and Jones had a "self-assured performance" adding, "There's a vaguely familiar quality to his voice, but at the same time you can't really name anyone he sounds like. It's a quality that could work in his favor."

== Discography ==
=== Studio albums ===
Title	Album details	Peak positions
Title	Album details	US Country
One Night	Release date: February 10, 1998; Label: Rising Tide Records	—

=== Singles ===
Year	Single	Peak chart positions	
Year	Single	US Country	CAN Country
1997	"One Night"	61	82

=== Music videos ===
Year	Video	Director
1997	"One Night"	Jim Hershleder
