= Dorkfish =

Live album by Bill Engvall
- Released: October 13, 1998
- Venue: Mark Ridley's Comedy Castle, Royal Oak, Michigan
- Genre: Comedy
- Length: 57:47
- Label: Warner Bros. Nashville

Bill Engvall chronology
Here's Your Sign (1996)	Dorkfish (1998)	Here's Your Christmas Album (1999)

Dorkfish is a 1998 comedy album by comedian Bill Engvall. It was released in 1998 via Warner Bros. Records. The album includes a novelty Christmas song titled "Here's Your Sign Christmas," which charted at #39 on Hot Country Songs in 1998 and #46 in 1999. "I'm a Cowboy," another musical track, peaked at #60 on the same chart.

== Track listing ==
All tracks written by Bill Engvall; "I'm a Cowboy" co-written by Aaron Barker; "Here's Your Sign Christmas" co-written by Doug Grau.

1. "Factory Outlet Malls" - 1:38
2. "Flying" - 3:35
3. "Smokers" - 1:57
4. "Weather and News" - 4:14
5. "Bungee Jumping and Parachuting" - 5:12
6. "My Daughter's Growing Up" - 2:32
7. "T-Ball and Indian Guides" - 8:03
8. "Minivan" - 1:43
9. "Discovery Channel" - 3:28
10. "Dorkfish" - 2:00
11. "Whale Watching" - 2:06
12. "Broke Food" - 2:56
13. "More Here's Your Sign" - 3:15
14. "Bronco Busting" - 4:49
15. "Deer Hunting" - 4:34
16. "I'm a Cowboy" - 3:17
  - musical track featuring Buddy Jewell (uncredited)
17. "Here's Your Sign Christmas" - 2:19
  - musical track featuring Kelli Bruce, Etta Britt, and Vickie Carrico

== Personnel ==
Technical

- Steve Allen - overdubbing ("Here's Your Sign Christmas")
- Bill Engvall - executive producer
- Doug Grau - producer, mixing
- Grant "Couch" Green - recording assistant ("I'm a Cowboy")
- Lee Groitzsch - mixing ("Here's Your Sign Christmas")
- Hugh Healy - recording
- John Jascsz - recording ("I'm a Cowboy"), mixing ("I'm a Cowboy" and "Here's Your Sign Christmas")
- Buddy Jewell - recording assistant ("I'm a Cowboy")
- Rocky Schnaars - recording ("Here's Your Sign Christmas")
- Ronnie Thomas - digital editing
- Hank Williams - mastering
- J.P. Williams - producer (except "I'm a Cowboy" and "Here's Your Sign Christmas")
- Brian David Willis - overdubbing ("Here's Your Sign Christmas")

Musicians on "I'm a Cowboy" and "Here's Your Sign Christmas"

- Tony Harrell - piano
- Duncan Mullins - bass guitar
- Gary Olyear - fiddle
- Al Perkins - pedal steel guitar
- Milton Sledge - drums
- John Willis - acoustic guitar, electric guitar

== Charts ==
=== Weekly charts ===
Chart (1998)	Peak position
US Billboard 200	119
US Top Country Albums (Billboard)	16

=== Year-end charts ===
Chart (1999)	Position
US Top Country Albums (Billboard)	46
