= Bill Engvall =

American comedian and actor

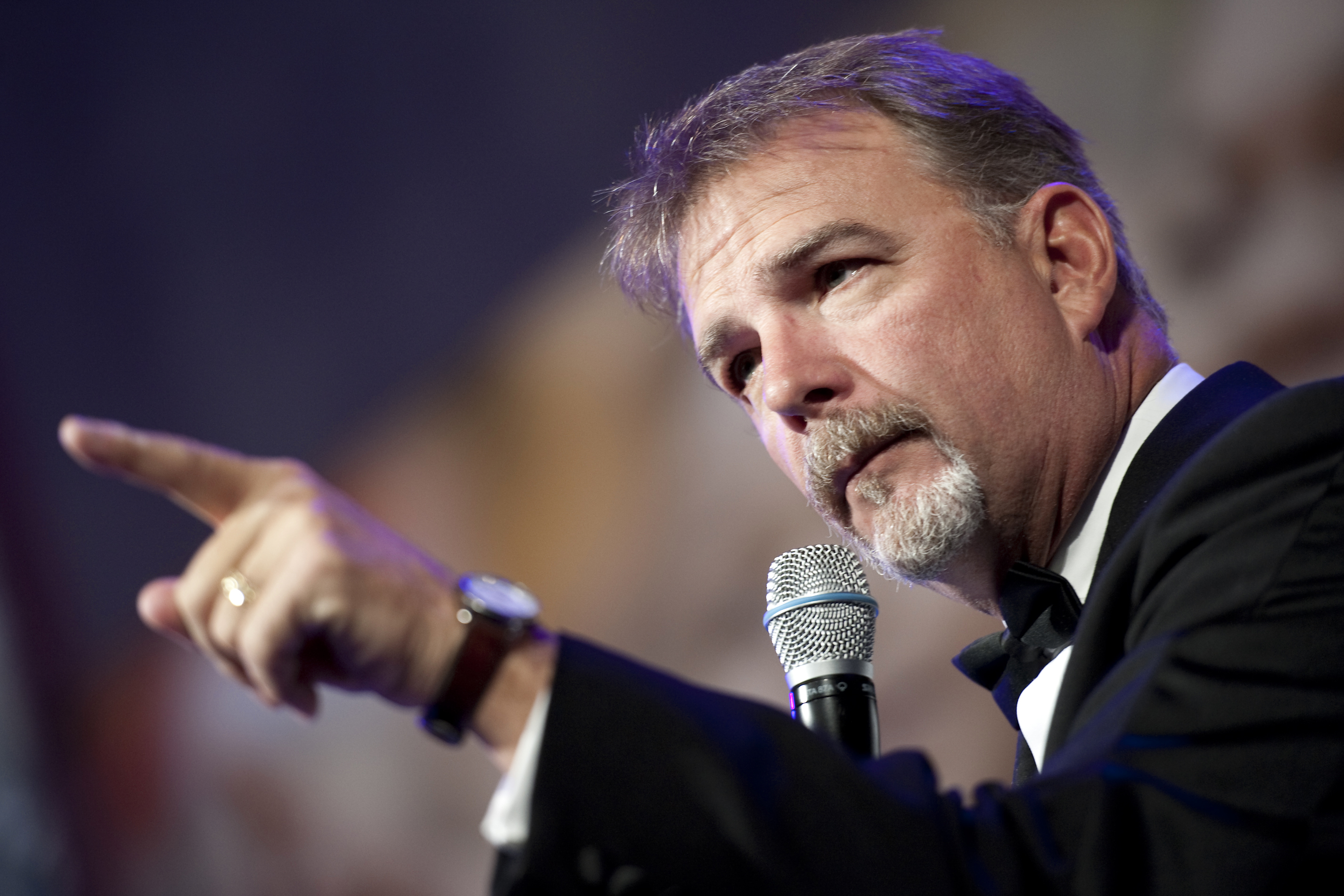
- Engvall performing at the USO Gala in the Marriott Wardman Park Hotel in Washington, D.C., October 2010
- Born: William Ray Engvall Jr. July 27, 1957 (age 69); Galveston, Texas, U.S.
- Occupations: Comedian; actor
- Years active: 1988–2022; 2025–present
- Known for: Blue Collar Comedy Tour; The Jeff Foxworthy Show; Country Fried Home Videos; Delta Farce; The Bill Engvall Show; Lingo (2011 Run)
- Spouse: Mary Gail Watson (m. 1982)
- Children: 2

Comedy career
- Medium: Stand-up; film; television
- Genres: Country comedy; observational comedy; satire
- Subjects: Southern American culture; everyday life; marriage; parenting; self-deprecation
- Website: billengvall.com

William Ray Engvall Jr. (born July 27, 1957) is an American stand-up comedian, actor, and television host. He has released stand-up comedy albums through Warner Records and BNA Records, which is defunct. His most-known album is his 1996 debut Here's Your Sign, certified platinum by the Recording Industry Association of America. The album derives its name from Engvall's signature routine "here's your sign", wherein he offers "signs" to people whom he deems lacking in intellect. He has toured as a comedian both by himself and as a member of Blue Collar Comedy Tour which included Jeff Foxworthy, Larry the Cable Guy, and Ron White. Engvall's television roles include Delta, The Jeff Foxworthy Show, The Bill Engvall Show, Last Man Standing, and Lingo.

== Early life ==
William Ray Engvall Jr. was born in Galveston, Texas on July 27, 1957. His father, William Ray Engvall Sr. (1934–2018), was a U. S. Navy doctor, who then went into private practice. His mother Jeanne (née Shinkle; 1936–2023) was a histotechnologist and realtor. During his childhood, he lived in Winslow, Arizona and Dallas, Texas (middle school years). He went to Richardson High School in Richardson, Texas and chose to play trombone when the teacher gave him the choice of either that or tuba, leading him to join the jazz marching band, After graduating, he attended Southwestern University in Georgetown, Texas, intending to earn a bachelor's degree and become a teacher. While at Southwestern, he was a member of Xi chapter of the Kappa Alpha Order.

Bill Engvall left college without graduating and worked a series of jobs including being a tour guide at Inner Space Cavern in Georgetown and disc jockey in a Dallas nightclub. While being a club DJ, he ventured into stand-up comedy at amateur and open mic nights around Dallas.

== Career ==
In 1990, Bill Engvall moved to Southern California to dedicate himself full-time to comedy. Early recognition came from hosting the cable show A Pair of Jokers with Rosie O'Donnell and an appearance on The Golden Palace where he played Blanche's son Matthew, a stockbroker turned aspiring comic. Other early appearances included hosting A&E Networks An Evening at The Improv as well as stand-up routines on The Tonight Show Starring Johnny Carson and the Late Show with David Letterman.

A career breakthrough happened in 1992 when Engvall was named Best Male Standup at the American Comedy Awards. His first role as a series regular came soon after when he was cast in the ABC series Delta, starring Delta Burke. However, the show only lasted a season and Engvall returned to making the rounds of comedy clubs and the occasional television appearance until 1996 when he was cast with fellow comic and best friend Jeff Foxworthy in a version of The Jeff Foxworthy Show on NBC. Signed by Warner Records in 1996, Engvall released the first of a series of successful comedy albums, Here's Your Sign, based on his signature joke. The album was certified platinum and peaked at No. 5 on the Billboard Country Chart. Excerpts from the album were remixed into a musical track titled "Here's Your Sign (Get the Picture)", featuring a chorus sung by country music artist Travis Tritt. "Here's Your Sign (Get the Picture)" charted at No. 29 on Billboard Hot Country Songs and No. 43 on the Billboard Hot 100 in 1997. Engvall released two more albums by the end of the 1990s: Dorkfish in 1998 and Here's Your Christmas Album in 1999. The latter featured narrations by Engvall, as well as songs he co-wrote sung by session musicians. One of the original compositions, "Here's Your Sign Christmas", also made the country charts in both 1998 and 1999.

In 2000, Engvall exited Warner Records for BNA Records, citing managerial changes at Warner. His only BNA album, Now That's Awesome, also came out in 2000. Like most of the albums before it, this included two tracks that merged stand-up lines from the album with a musical track. The title track featured guest vocals from T. Graham Brown, Tracy Byrd, and Neal McCoy, while "Shoulda Shut Up" featured Julie Reeves.

Engvall returned to Warner for all subsequent albums. Cheap Drunk: An Autobiography in 2002, Here's Your Sign Reloaded in 2003, 15° Off Cool in 2007, and Aged and Confused in 2009. In 2021, he announced his intention to retire from stand-up comedy after his "Here's Your Sign, It's Finally Time" farewell tour. He posted a video on YouTube confirming his retirement on December 30, 2022. His final performance was at the Eccles Theater in Salt Lake City the next day. In 2025, Engvall came out of retirement from comedy when he announced a show to be performed at the Treasure Island Resort and Casino in Welch, Minnesota, in September 2025.

=== Blue Collar Comedy Tour ===
In 2000, Jeff Foxworthy and Engvall launched the first of six Blue Collar Comedy Tours. The tours also featured Ron White and Larry the Cable Guy and were largely responsible for their breakout success. Each of the six years of the tour was very successful and spawned three films, a satellite radio show, and a television series titled Blue Collar TV on The WB Network.

=== The Bill Engvall Show ===
In 2007, Engvall starred in his own sitcom where he played himself as a family counselor. The show lasted three seasons.

=== Game show host ===
On June 6, 2011, Engvall took over as host of Lingo on Game Show Network. According to an interview in American Profile magazine, he said that he jumped at the chance to host the show, citing the fun that his friend Foxworthy had hosting Are You Smarter Than a 5th Grader? Engvall had been a fan of Lingo when it aired a few years previously before ending in 2007, admitting that his wife always beat him to the answers. When asked if there were any plans to have buddies Foxworthy or Larry the Cable Guy appear on Lingo, he replied, "You never know! I would love to have them on the show because it would be a blast. I would really dig that."

=== Dancing with the Stars ===
In 2013, Engvall was announced as a contestant on the 17th season of Dancing with the Stars paired with professional dancer Emma Slater. In the first week, he danced a foxtrot and received a score of 18. The second week was Latin week and he received some higher scores from the judges receiving a 21 for his jive. In the third week of competition, he received his highest score of 24 with a Paso Doble to the Lone Ranger theme song. Throughout the rest of the show, the judges usually placed Engvall and Slater at the bottom of the leaderboard, but an enormous fan base kept them in the competition, resulting in higher-scoring contestants, e.g. Christina Milian, Snooki, Brant Daugherty, Elizabeth Berkley, and Leah Remini being voted out instead. On November 18, Engvall and Slater made it to the finals, along with Amber Riley, Jack Osbourne, and Corbin Bleu. The two finished in fourth place.

== Comedic style ==
Engvall's most well-known routine is "here's your sign". In this routine, he offers "signs" to people whom he considers lacking in intellect. These jokes typically take the form of another person asking him a "stupid question", to which Engvall typically responds with a sarcastic response before telling the person "here's your sign". Other jokes in his routine include anecdotes about his life as a father and husband, typically in the form of self-deprecation.

== Personal life ==
Bill and Gail Engvall (born August 5, 1960) married on December 18, 1982. They have a daughter named Emily (born June 9, 1986), a 2008 graduate from the University of Puget Sound in Tacoma, Washington, who is married to Will Holden, as well as a son, Travis (born June 25, 1991), a 2015 graduate from Northern Arizona University in Flagstaff, both of whom are often mentioned during his routines. Bill and Gail Engvall live in Utah and he maintains a blog for the Los Angeles Angels on the website of Fox Sports West. He is an ordained minister and graduated with a degree in Christian Studies from Grand Canyon University in Phoenix in 2021.

== Discography ==
=== Albums ===
Title	Album details	Peak chart positions			Certifications (sales thresholds)
Title	Album details	U.S. Country	U.S.	U.S. Comedy	Certifications (sales thresholds)
Here's Your Sign^{[A]}	Release date: August 28, 1995; Label: Warner Records	5	50	—	U.S.: Platinum
Dorkfish	Release date: October 13, 1998; Label: Warner Records	16	119	—	U.S.: Gold
Here's Your Christmas Album^{[B]}	Release date: September 28, 1999; Label: Warner Records	44	—	—	
Now That's Awesome	Release date: August 22, 2000; Label: BNA Records	14	133	—	
Cheap Drunk: An Autobiography	Release date: September 24, 2002; Label: Warner Records	37	—	—	
Here's Your Sign Reloaded	Release date: November 11, 2003; Label: Warner Records	37	—	12	
A Decade of Laughs	Release date: October 26, 2004; Label: Warner Records	27	183	1 ^{[C]}	
15° Off Cool	Release date: February 27, 2007; Label: Warner Records	16	93	1	
Aged and Confused	Release date: October 6, 2009; Label: Warner Records	29	159	2	
Them Idiots Whirled Tour (with Jeff Foxworthy and Larry the Cable Guy)	Release date: March 13, 2012; Label: Warner Records	45	—	1	
Ultimate Laughs	Release date: March 9, 2014; Label: Warner Records	—	—	—	
"—" denotes releases that did not chart

Notes

- A Here's Your Sign also peaked at number 3 on Top Heatseekers.
- B Here's Your Christmas Album also peaked at number 33 on Top Holiday Albums. It was re-released in 2005.
- C A Decade of Laughs was the second number 1 album upon the 2004 debut of the Billboard "Top Comedy Albums" chart, after Lord, I Apologize by fellow Blue Collar Comedy star Larry the Cable Guy.

=== Singles ===
Year	Single	Peak chart positions			Album
Year	Single	U.S. Country	U.S.	CAN Country	Album
1997	"Here's Your Sign (Get the Picture)" (with Travis Tritt)	29	43	72	—N/a
1997	"Warning Signs" (with John Michael Montgomery)	56	—	—	—N/a
1998	"It's Hard to Be a Parent"	72	—	—	—N/a
1998	"I'm a Cowboy"	60	—	—	Dorkfish
1998	"Here's Your Sign Christmas"	50	—	—	Dorkfish
1999	"Hollywood Indian Guides"	72	—	—	—N/a
2000	"Blue Collar Dollar" (with Jeff Foxworthy and Marty Stuart)	63	—	—	Blue Collar Comedy Tour
2000	"Now That's Awesome" (with Neal McCoy, Tracy Byrd and T. Graham Brown)	59	—	—	Now That's Awesome
2000	"Shoulda Shut Up" (with Julie Reeves, uncredited)	71	—	—	Now That's Awesome
"—" denotes releases that did not chart

=== Other charted songs ===
Year	Single	Peak positions	Album
Year	Single	U.S. Country	Album
1999	"Here's Your Sign Christmas" (re-entry)	39	Here's Your Christmas Album
2000	"Here's Your Sign Christmas" (re-entry)	46	Here's Your Christmas Album

=== Music videos ===
Year	Video	Director
1997	"Here's Your Sign (Get the Picture)" (with Travis Tritt)	Jim Yukich
1997	"Warning Signs" (with John Michael Montgomery)	Peter Zavadil
1998	"I'm a Cowboy"	Peter Zavadil
1998	"Here's Your Sign Christmas"	Peter Zavadil
1999	"Hollywood Indian Guides"	Peter Zavadil
2000	"Blue Collar Dollar" (with Jeff Foxworthy and Marty Stuart)	Thomas Smugala
2000	"Now That's Awesome"	Peter Zavadil

== List of works ==
=== Bibliography ===
- You Don't Have to Be Dumb to Be Stupid (with David G. Brown); Longstreet Press, 1997; ISBN 978-1563523892
- Here's Your Sign!; Thomas Nelson, 2005; ISBN 978-1401602345
- Just a Guy: Notes from a Blue Collar Life; St. Martin's Press, 2007; ISBN 0-312-36267-6

=== Filmography ===
Year	Title	Role	Notes
1982	Split Image	Student	
1984	Not for Publication	Second photographer	
1990	Designing Women	Bill	Episode: "Tough Enough"
1992–1993	Delta	Buck Overton	17 episodes
1993	The Golden Palace	Matthew Devereaux	Episode: "Say Goodbye, Rose"
1996–1997	The Jeff Foxworthy Show	Bill Pelton	14 episodes
2003	Blue Collar Comedy Tour: The Movie		
2004	Blue Collar Comedy Tour Rides Again		
2004	Here's Your Sign Live		Live
2004–2006	Blue Collar TV	Various	47 episodes
2005	Mobile Home Disaster		
2006	Blue Collar Comedy Tour: One For the Road		
2006–2009	Country Fried Home Videos	Host	
2007	Family Guy	Duke Dillon (voice)	Episode: "Boys Do Cry"
2007	Delta Farce	Bill Little	
2007–2009	The Bill Engvall Show	Bill Pearson	30 episodes
2008	Country Fried Planet		
2008, 2015	Celebrity Family Feud		
2008	Bait Shop	Bill Dugan	Video
2009	Strawberry Wine		
2009	Cowboy Dreams	Bill	Short
2009	All's Faire in Love	Mr. Mendelson	
2009	CMT Music Awards	Host	
2010	Leverage	Duke Penzer	Episode: "The Boost Job"
2010	Bed & Breakfast: Love is a Happy Accident	Pete Sullivan	
2011	Lingo	Host	
2011	Hawthorne	Det. James 'Jimmy' Dupree	3 episodes
2012	Them Idiots: Whirled Tour		
2012	Kiss at Pine Lake	Frank McDowell	TV movie
2013	Bounty Hunters	Bill	12 episodes
2013	Dancing with the Stars		competition reality show
2014	Do It Yourself	Dale	TV movie
2015	Who Wants to Be a Millionaire		
2015	Sharknado 3: Oh Hell No!	Gary Martin Hays	TV movie
2015	Catching Faith	Coach Z	
2015–2016	Celebrity Name Game	Himself / Celebrity Player	Three episodes with Nicole Sullivan
2016	Hell's Kitchen	Himself / Restaurant Patron	Episode: "8 Chefs Compete"
2016	The Neighbor	Troy	
2016	Wish For Christmas	Santa	
2016	Just Sell Him For Parts	Himself	Stand-up
2016-2021	Last Man Standing	Reverend Paul	8 episodes
2017-2019	Funny You Should Ask	Himself	64 episodes
2018	Mr. Invincible	Eddie King	
2019	Catching Faith 2: The Homecoming	Coach Z	
2022	Outsiders	Tim	
2024	Barmageddon	Himself	Episode: "Bill Engvall vs. A. J. McCarron"

Awards and achievements
Preceded by Alexandra Raisman & Mark Ballas	Dancing with the Stars (US) semifinalist Season 17 (Fall 2013 with Emma Slater)	Succeeded by James Maslow & Peta Murgatroyd
