= Kris Tyler =

American singer-songwriter

- Born: December 20, 1964 (age 61); Omaha, Nebraska, United States
- Genres: Country
- Occupation: Singer
- Instrument: Vocals
- Years active: 1997–1998
- Label: Rising Tide

Kris Tyler is an American country music artist. Tyler has released one studio album; she also charted two singles on the Billboard Hot Country Singles & Tracks chart. Her highest charting single, "What a Woman Knows," peaked at No. 45 in 1997.

== Biography ==
Kris Tyler was born December 20, 1964 in Omaha, Nebraska. Tyler began working in television, including a production role at KNXV-TV in Phoenix, Arizona, but expressed interest in songwriting. Through recommendations by other artists, she was signed to Rising Tide Records in 1997. The label issued her only album, What a Woman Knows, at the beginning of 1998. Both "Keeping Your Kisses" and "What a Woman Knows" made the Billboard Hot Country Songs charts. An uncredited review in the same publication was favorable toward the album, praising Tyler's singing voice and songwriting, as well as the production work of Emory Gordy Jr. and Tony Brown. Promotion of the album stopped in April 1998 when Rising Tide Records closed.

== Discography ==
=== Albums ===
Title	Album details
What a Woman Knows	Release date: January 13, 1998; Label: Rising Tide Records

=== Singles ===
Title	Year	Peak chart positions		Album
Title	Year	US Country	CAN Country	Album
"Keeping Your Kisses"	1997	68	—	What a Woman Knows
"What a Woman Knows"	1997	45	66	What a Woman Knows
"I'm in Trouble Now"	1998	—	—	What a Woman Knows
"—" denotes releases that did not chart

=== Music videos ===
Title	Year	Director
"Keeping Your Kisses"	1997	Steven Goldmann
"What a Woman Knows"	1997	Steven Goldmann
