= Roy D. Mercer =

Fictional comedy character

- First appearance: How Big 'a Boy Are Ya? Vol. 1
- Last appearance: Red, White & Bruised
- Created by: Brent Douglas, Phil Stone
- Voiced by: Brent Douglas

In-universe information
- Gender: Male
- Occupation: Prank caller
- Nationality: American

Roy D. Mercer is a fictional character created by American disc jockeys Brent Douglas and Phil Stone on radio station KMOD-FM in Tulsa, Oklahoma. Douglas, who performed Mercer's voice, used the character as a vehicle for comedy sketches in which he performed prank calls. The two released twelve albums of prank call recordings under the Roy D. Mercer name via Virgin Records and Capitol Records. The character was retired in 2013 after Stone's death.

== History ==
Brent Douglas and Phil Stone, disc jockeys at rock music radio station KMOD-FM in Tulsa, Oklahoma, created the Roy D. Mercer character in 1993. Initially, they used the character on comedy sketches for the radio station. Originally, the prank call sketches were a part of KMOD's morning show. By 1997, Capitol Records Nashville began issuing the sketches on compact disc. The first was titled How Big a Boy Are Ya?, Volume 1, in reference to one of Mercer's catch phrases. Eleven additional compilation albums have been released on the Capitol and Virgin Records labels. A Virgin Records Nashville executive noted that Mercer's early albums managed to sell between 250,000 and 300,000 copies, primarily due to word of mouth, without any promotion to consumers or radio airplay of the album tracks.

In most of the sketches, Mercer will demand that the recipient of a call pay him money for some incident, and if the recipient refuses, he will threaten them with violence. Mercer has been described as speaking with "a mush-mouthed Southern drawl" and his style of comedy has been described as "not exactly obscene ... [but] border[ing] on offensive". Many of the recipients of the calls are suggested by their friends who supply Mercer with information about the potential recipients. Three notable people that Douglas and Stone had called were Bill Goldberg (”Roy Vs. Goldberg”), cinematographer Barry Markowitz, as suggested by Billy Bob Thornton (“Yankee in a Strange Land”), and Chris Bray, production manager for Steppenwolf (“Tragic Carpet Ride”).

On October 12, 2012, the Phil and Brent Show ended its 27-year run with KMOD-FM radio. On November 21, Stone died from causes related to heart disease at the age of 57. In 2020, Douglas stated to The Tulsa World: "When Phil passed, that was the end of (Roy). I couldn’t do it without him, and wasn’t going to do it without him. It wouldn’t have been the same." Douglas himself would later die from an unknown cause on February 8, 2025.

== John Bean's "Leroy Mercer" character of the 1980s ==
Many claim that Roy D. Mercer was inspired by "Leroy Mercer," a character created in Tennessee by Knoxville resident John R. Bean, who made prank calls circulated by hand-to-hand tape exchange in the early 1980s. Leroy Mercer, voiced by John Bean, also called individuals and businesses threatening an "ass-whuppin". There are many parallels and similarities to the calls, with Roy D. Mercer using many of the former Leroy Mercer's lines. John Bean died from cancer in his early 30s in 1984; Stone and Douglas said that they originally invented their Roy D. Mercer character in 1990 before his official creation in 1993, and that part of the name and lines used in Roy D. Mercer's recordings were, in part copied from John Bean.

== Discography ==
=== Studio albums ===
Year	Album	Chart Positions			
Year	Album	US Comedy	US Country	US Heat	US
1996	How Big 'a Boy Are Ya? Vol. 1		39	28	
1996	How Big 'a Boy Are Ya? Vol. 2		43	33	
1997	How Big 'a Boy Are Ya? Vol. 3		31	11	
1998	How Big 'a Boy Are Ya? Vol. 4		19	6	160
1998	How Big 'a Boy Are Ya? Vol. 5		13	4	138
1999	How Big 'a Boy Are Ya? Vol. 6		16	5	164
2000	How Big 'a Boy Are Ya? Vol. 7: Hangin' It Up?		32	22	
2001	Roy D. Mercer vs. Yankees		24	17	
2003	Roy D. Mercer Hits the Road		31	23	
2004	Get Well Soon	7	52	49	
2006	Black & Blue	3	31		146
2013	Red, White & Bruised	7			

=== Compilation albums ===
Year	Album	Chart Positions		
Year	Album	US Comedy	US Country	US Heat
2000	Greatest Fits: The Best of How Big 'a Boy Are Ya?		26	
2002	The Roy D. Mercer Family Album		35	47
2007	The Best of Roy D. Mercer Double Wide Vol. 1	8		
2007	The Best of Roy D. Mercer Double Wide Vol. 2	9		
2007	The Best of Roy D. Mercer Double Wide Vol. 3	7	73	
2008	The Best of Roy D. Mercer Double Wide Vol. 4			
2008	The Best of Roy D. Mercer Double Wide Vol. 5			
2008	The Best of Roy D. Mercer Double Wide Vol. 6			
2008	More Greatest Fits	3	40	
2010	10 Great Skits	2	45	20
2012	The Very Worst of Roy D. Mercer: Ultimate Fits!	3	75	

=== Music videos ===
Year	Video	Director
1999	"How Big 'a Boy Are Ya?" (with Charlie Daniels)	Peter Zavadil

== See also ==
- The Jerky Boys
- Touch-Tone Terrorists
- Tube Bar prank calls
- Longmont Potion Castle
- List of practical joke topics
