= Julie Reeves =

American singer-songwriter

- Born: June 18, 1974 (age 51)
- Origin: Ashland, Kentucky, United States
- Genres: Country
- Occupation: Singer-songwriter
- Instrument: Vocals
- Years active: 1999–present
- Labels: Virgin Records Nashville, Capitol Records

Julie Reeves (born June 18, 1974) is an American country music recording artist and radio personality. She has had three hit singles on the Billboard Hot Country Songs chart with two of those singles charting in the Top 40. Reeves was formerly married to country music parodist and fellow recording artist Cledus T. Judd but she is now married to bluegrass singer and musician, Chris Davis.

== Biography ==
Julie Reeves grew up in the city of Ashland, Kentucky then moved to Nashville in 1994 where she gained employment in the country music industry. Some of her first assignments in Nashville were providing vocals in studio sessions and doing back-up studio work. She also worked on demo recordings prior to signing with Capitol Records in 1997. She recorded her debut album with producer Scott Hendricks. After finishing the album, Hendricks left Capitol Records to head the newly formed Virgin Records Nashville. Julie became the flagship artist of Virgin Records Nashville and released her debut album It's About Time in 1999 and featured three hit singles which charted on the Billboard Hot Country Songs charts including two Top 40 hits. She was featured on "Shoulda Shut Up", a song featuring Bill Engvall's spoken-word comedy and a sung chorus. Reeves married country music parodist Cledus T. Judd and gave birth to a daughter, Caitlyn Rose, in 2004. After giving birth, Reeves took a break from the country music business to raise her daughter. She later divorced Judd and returned home to the Ashland, Kentucky area. She is now married to bluegrass musician Chris Davis. The two of them have a son together, Rylan Wesley Davis, born November 5, 2011.

Beginning in April 2013, Reeves became host of the Julie Reeves Live morning show on 93.7 The Dawg (WDGG), which once had the highest share of listeners of all radio stations in the Huntington, WV-Ashland, KY market. She is now the midday announcers for Big Buck Country, a classic country station in the Huntington market. Coincidentally, Reeves morning radio show aired at the same time as her ex-husband Cledus T. Judd's in the Huntington-Ashland MSA. Judd is co-host of The Cletus T. Judd Party on WTCR-FM 103.3.

== Discography ==
=== Studio albums ===
Title	Album details	Peak chart positions	
Title	Album details	US Country	CAN Country
It's About Time	Release date: April 20, 1999; Label: Virgin Records	70	14

=== Singles ===
Year	Single	Peak chart positions		Album
Year	Single	US Country	CAN Country	Album
1999	"It's About Time"	51	53	It's About Time
1999	"Trouble Is a Woman"	39	57	It's About Time
1999	"What I Need"	38	71	It's About Time

=== Music videos ===
Year	Video	Director
1999	"It's About Time"	Steven Goldmann
1999	"Trouble Is a Woman"	Guy Guillet
1999	"What I Need"	Stephen Shepherd
