= Patrick Davis (musician) =

American singer-songwriter

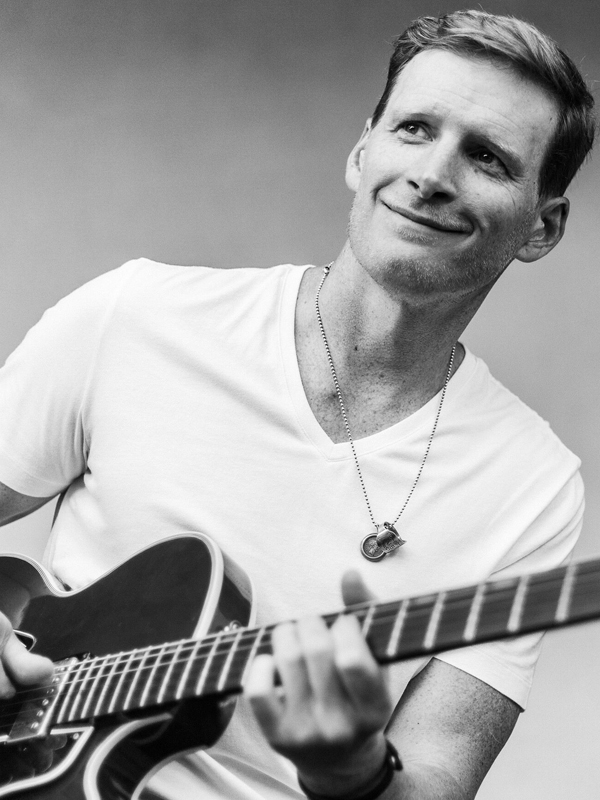

Background information
- Origin: Camden, South Carolina, United States
- Genres: Americana, country rock, roots rock
- Years active: 2003–present
- Spouse: Lauren Jenkins (m. 2022)
- Website: patrickdavismusic.com

Russell Patrick Davis (born November 12, 1976) is an American singer-songwriter, musician, and record producer.

== Early life ==
Patrick Davis was born on November 12, 1976, in Murfreesboro, Tennessee. The son of Rusty and Jean Davis, He was raised in Camden, South Carolina before moving to Nashville, Tennessee. to pursue a career in music.

Davis attended Camden High School in Camden, South Carolina where he was an honors student and athlete. His interest in music began during high school, and at the age of 16 he joined his father on stage for his first ever performance. His talent developed throughout high school and into his college career at University of South Carolina, where he earned a bachelor's degree in History. It was during this time he became a mainstay of the Columbia, South Carolina music scene and decided to become a professional musician.

== Career ==
In 2003, Patrick Davis released his debut solo album, Chances Are, which was co-produced by Hootie & the Blowfish guitarist Mark Bryan. While touring for Chances Are, Davis landed a songwriting and publishing deal with EMI Music Publishing of Nashville, Tennessee.

Davis' first wide scale commercial songwriting success came in 2006, when he co-wrote "Dixie Lullaby" for Pat Green, which in turn went into the top 20 for the country music airplay chart. This led to a series of songwriting collaborations with Darius Rucker, Jewel, Guy Clark, and others from 2007 to 2009. During his time writing, Davis also opened for several artists, including Darius Rucker and Hootie & the Blowfish.

2009 saw Davis' "Big Ole (Game) Cock" became a cult anthem at the University of South Carolina before he released his second solo album, Numbers, in 2010. During this time he also wrote Jason Michael Carroll's "Where I'm From," which went to No. 1 on the XM Highway Chart and the top 10 Billboard Chart. This led to his nomination for Music Row Magazine's top up and coming songwriter in Nashville for 2010

Throughout 2011 and 2012, Davis continued writing while also transitioning into production and experimenting with genres outside of country music. He left EMI Music Publishing during this time to join Ben Vaughn at Warner Brothers' Warner Chappell Music Publishing in Nashville, Tennessee. In 2011 Davis produced an album for Jason Michael Carroll and another project for Texas songwriter Django Walker. During this time, Davis had the song "Love I've Found in You" recorded by country trio Lady Antebellum and also wrote 15 of the 18 songs on his long time collaborator Jewel's debut children's album, The Merry Goes Round, after which the pair performed their song "Only Shadows" live together on Regis and Kelly. Davis released his third solo album The Cuts Vol. 1 in 2012.

In 2013, Davis created the "Songwriters in Paradise Hope Town," a three night songwriters festival hosted at the Firefly Sunset Resort in Hope Town, Abaco in the Bahamas. Davis then partnered with his alma mater to produce The Gamecock Album, which featured the track "We Ain't Far," wherein University of South Carolina alumni Patrick Davis, Darius Rucker, and Edwin McCain shared lead vocals. 2013 also saw Jimmy Buffett release Davis' "Something Bout a Boat" on his Songs from St. Somewhere album.

In 2014, Davis released Red, White & Blue Jeans, his fourth full-length studio album, which contained guest appearances from many of his long time and new collaborating artists such as Jewel, Robert Randolph, and Branford Marsalis. He spent the remainder of the year touring with Darius Rucker in Europe.

In 2016, Patrick Davis formed the 11 piece touring band Patrick Davis & His Midnight Choir. The band's members included his sister Megan on backup vocals and his father Rusty on lead guitar. They toured the southeast heavily throughout 2016. During this time Davis also opened for Vince Gill and performed at Bill Murray's Caddyshack Charity Golf Event and Hootie & The Blowfish's Monday After the Masters. He was the guest singer for the US National Anthem and also performed "God Bless America" at the Baltimore Orioles game that same year. He also co-wrote "Let It Do What It Do" with Robert Randolph and "Call Me" with Imelda May.

In 2017, Patrick Davis hosted both his "SIP Hope Town" Songwriters' Festival in Hope Town, Abaco and his "SIP Cabo" Songwriters Festival in Cabo San Lucas, Mexico. He also headlined Nashville's Bluebird Cafe, sold out multiple venues in the Southeast with his Midnight Choir, and performed with several of his long time collaborative acts like Darius Rucker, Amos Lee, and Charles Kelly of Lady Antebellum. When the University of South Carolina Gamecock men's basketball team made a run for the final four in the NCAA tournament, Patrick wrote and recorded the ode "God Bless Sin". This same year saw Patrick's ninth music release with Where Does It Go.

In 2019 Patrick Davis was awarded the Order of the Silver Crescent, one of the highest civilian honors in South Carolina, awarded to him by Governor Henry McMaster. That same year Hurricane Dorian struck the Abaco Islands leaving a wake of destruction and need in its path. Patrick Davis along with fellow artists put together the SIP Hope 4 Hope Town at the Ryman concert event which along with generous donations raised over 1 million dollars in much needed relief.

2020 saw the release of Davis' tenth recording Couch Covers, which was produced in both traditional vinyl LP fashion and CD/digital download.

== Personal life ==
Patrick Davis lives in Nashville, Tennessee. He is also the president of the Roger J. Davis Memorial Fund, which he and his family started after his younger brother Roger was killed in a single vehicle alcohol related accident on June 29, 2008. The RJDMF hosts fundraising events intended to raise awareness about driving safety and prevent alcohol related driving deaths. Davis married talent manager Virginia Hunt Davis in 2001. In 2021, he proposed to singer-songwriter Lauren Jenkins in Napa, California at a songwriter's event. They married in October 2022.

== Discography ==
=== Studio albums ===
- Chances Are (2003)
- Worktapes (The Diamond in the Making EP) (2007)
- Just A Big Ole (Game) Cock (2009)
- Numbers (2010)
- The Cuts Vol. 1 (2012)
- The Gamecock Album (2013)
- Red, White & Blue Jeans (2014)
- Big Ole Yardcock (2015)
- Where Does It Go (2017)
- Couch Covers (2020)

=== Songs (credited as songwriter) ===
- Guy Clark - “Wrong Side of the Tracks”
- Jimmy Buffett - “Something Bout A Boat”
- Jewel - “Sweet Dreams”
- Pat Green - “Home”
- Robert Randolph featuring Darius Rucker - “Let It Do What It Do (L-O-V-E)”
- Imelda May - “Call Me”
- Lady Antebellum - “Love I Found In You”
- Django Walker featuring Jerry Jeff Walker - “Something Bout A Boat”
- Jewel - “Count On Me”
- Will Hoge - “A Different Man”
- Guy Clark - “All She Wants Is You”
- Pat Green featuring Marc Broussard - “Good Night In New Orleans”
- Ashley Campbell - “New Year”
- Morgan Wallen - “Outlaw”
- Darius Rucker - “Be Wary Of A Woman”
- A Thousand Horses - “First Time”
- Django Walker - “Texas Longhorn”
- Pat Green - “In it for the Money”
- Jason Michael Carroll - “Where I’m From”
- Maggie Rose - “Broken”
- Alabama - “No Bad Days”
- Jason Michael Carroll - “Numbers”
- Josh Kelley - “Ain’t Lettin’ Go”
- Cory Morrow - “Beat Of Your Heart”
- Maggie Rose - “Change the Whole Thing”
- Pat Green - “Dixie Lullaby”
- Django Walker - “No Bad Days”
- Imelda May - “Leave Me Lonely”
- Casey James - “So Sweet”
- Pat Green - “Cannonball”
- Shawn Colvin - “All She Wants Is You”
- Jesse Rice - “Hope Town”
- Pat Green - “Love Like That”
- Jewel - “Sammy the Spider”
- Darius Rucker - “It’s All Over”
- Jewel - “Only Shadows”
- James Otto - “Somewhere Tonight”
- Jewel - “Give Me the Rainbow”
- Cory Morrow - “Good Intentions”
- The Grascals - “Two Boys On A Dirt Road”
- Jewel - “Just Like Penguins Do”
- Chuck Meade - “I Wish It Was Friday”
- Channing Wilson - “Black Jesus”
- Jason Michael Carroll - “My Favorite”
- Ray Johnston - “She’s Like Mexico”
- Pat Green - “Won’t Let Love”
- Django Walker - “Young Enough to Run”
- Meghan Linsey - “Sunshine In My Soul”
- Jewel - “Happy”
- Jason Michael Carroll - “Meet Me in the Barn”
- Laura Bell Bundy - “Makin’ Me Feel”
- Django Walker - “Girl Down in Texas”
- Love & Theft - “Like I Feel It”
- Jewel - “Bucky the Bull”
- The McClymonts - “Hearts On Fire”
- Ashley Campbell - “Forever’s Not That Long”
- Ray Johnston - “Alabama Crimson Tide”
- Jewel - “Play Day”
- Jewel - “Snooze Button Blues”
- Jason Michael Carroll - “We Threw It All Away”
- Jewel - “In My Room”
- Jason Michael Carroll - “Let Me”
- Jason Eady - “Black Jesus”
- Django Walker - “God Only Knows”
