= Icon (Billy Currington album) =

Compilation album by Billy Currington
- Released: March 22, 2011
- Genre: Country
- Length: 43:07
- Label: Mercury Nashville

Billy Currington chronology
Enjoy Yourself (2010)	Icon (2011)	We Are Tonight (2013)

Icon is a compilation album by American country music artist Billy Currington. It was released on March 22, 2011. It is part of a series of similar Icon albums released by Universal Music Enterprises. The album includes Currington's first nine singles, four of which reached number one, as well as album tracks "Swimmin' in Sunshine" and "She's Got a Way with Me."

== Track listing ==
No.	Title	Writer(s)	Length
1.	"I Got a Feelin'"	Casey Beathard, Carson Chamberlain, Billy Currington	3:15
2.	"Must Be Doin' Somethin' Right"	Marty Dodson, Patrick Jason Matthews	4:31
3.	"Why, Why, Why"	Currington, Tony Martin, Mark Nesler	2:46
4.	"Good Directions"	Luke Bryan, Rachel Thibodeau	3:37
5.	"That's How Country Boys Roll"	Currington, Dallas Davidson, Brett Jones	3:46
6.	"Don't"	Jim Beavers, Jonathan Singleton	3:58
7.	"People Are Crazy"	Bobby Braddock, Troy Jones	3:53
8.	"Tangled Up"	Currington, Chris Lindsey, Aimee Mayo	4:07
9.	"Walk a Little Straighter"	Beathard, Chamberlain, Currington	3:43
10.	"Swimmin' in Sunshine"	Brett Beavers, J. Beavers	4:47
11.	"She's Got a Way with Me"	Currington, Michael McDonald	4:44

== Critical reception ==
Professional ratings
Review scores
Source	Rating
Allmusic	3/5 stars

Thom Jurek of AllMusic notes that the album is "for those who came late to the party […] or are simply looking for a prime Billy Currington playlist."

== Chart performance ==
Icon debuted at number 22 on the U.S. Billboard Top Country Albums chart and number 104 on the Billboard 200.

== Charts ==
=== Weekly charts ===
Chart (2011–2012)	Peak position
US Billboard 200	104
US Top Country Albums (Billboard)	22

=== Year-end charts ===
Chart (2011)	Position
US Top Country Albums (Billboard)	58
Chart (2012)	Position
US Top Country Albums (Billboard)	46
