= List of Top Country Albums number ones of 2007 =

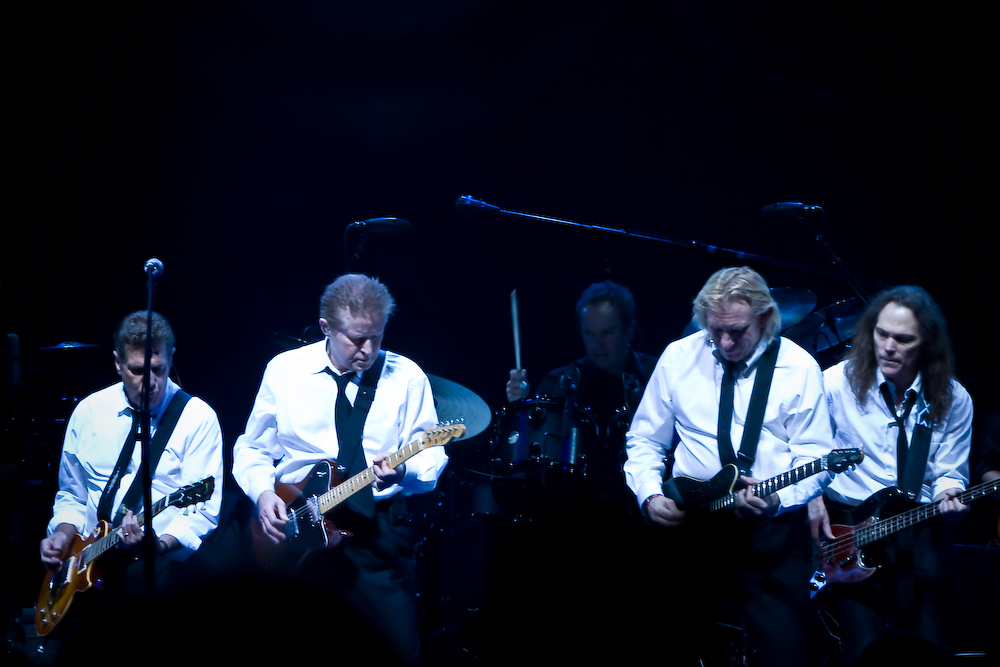
The Eagles topped the chart with Long Road Out of Eden, their first album for nearly 30 years.

Top Country Albums is a chart that ranks the top-performing country music albums in the United States, published by Billboard. In 2007, 21 different albums topped the chart, based on electronic point of sale data provided by SoundScan Inc.

In the issue of Billboard dated January 6, Carrie Underwood was at number one with Some Hearts, the album's 19th week in the top spot. Having first reached number one in late 2005, the album returned to the top spot several times over the next 18 months. It was the biggest-selling country music of both 2006 and 2007. Underwood returned to the top spot in November with her next album Carnival Ride, making her one of two acts to achieve two number ones during the year; the other was the trio Rascal Flatts, who spent two weeks at number one with Me and My Gang in January and then returned to the peak position in October with Still Feels Good, which spent four weeks atop the chart. Me and My Gang, Still Feels Good and Carnival Ride all topped the all-genre Billboard 200 chart, as did albums by Tim McGraw, Toby Keith, Reba McEntire and the Eagles.

Four acts reached number one for the first time in 2007, most notably teenage vocalist Taylor Swift, whose self-titled debut album had the year's longest unbroken run at number one, spending eight consecutive weeks in the top spot. Swift would quickly become a major star in the country field before moving into the pop music market, where she would become one of the most successful artists in the world. The three other first-time country chart-toppers of 2007 each spent a single week in the top spot: Jason Michael Carroll with Waitin' in the Country in February, former American Idol finalist Bucky Covington with his self-titled album in May, and Jason Aldean with Relentless in June. The year's final chart-topper was Long Road Out of Eden by the Eagles, which entered the chart at number one in the issue of Billboard dated November 17. It spent two weeks in the top spot, was displaced for two weeks by Garth Brooks's compilation album The Ultimate Hits, then returned to number one and remained there for the remainder of the year. It was the band's first studio album since 1979's The Long Run; having been inactive since 1980, the band had reformed in 1994 but did not release any new material until 2007.

== Chart history ==
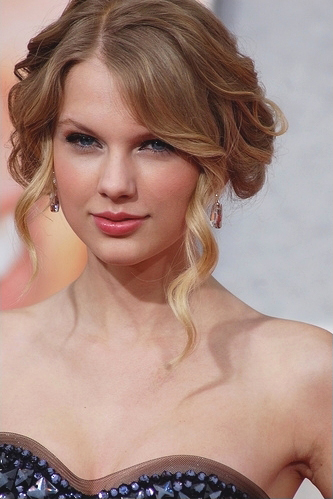
Taylor Swift topped the chart for the first time with her self-titled album.

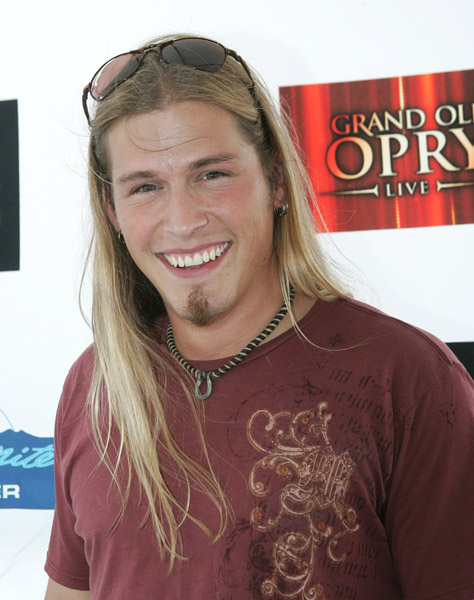
Jason Michael Carroll reached number one with his debut album Waitin' in the Country.

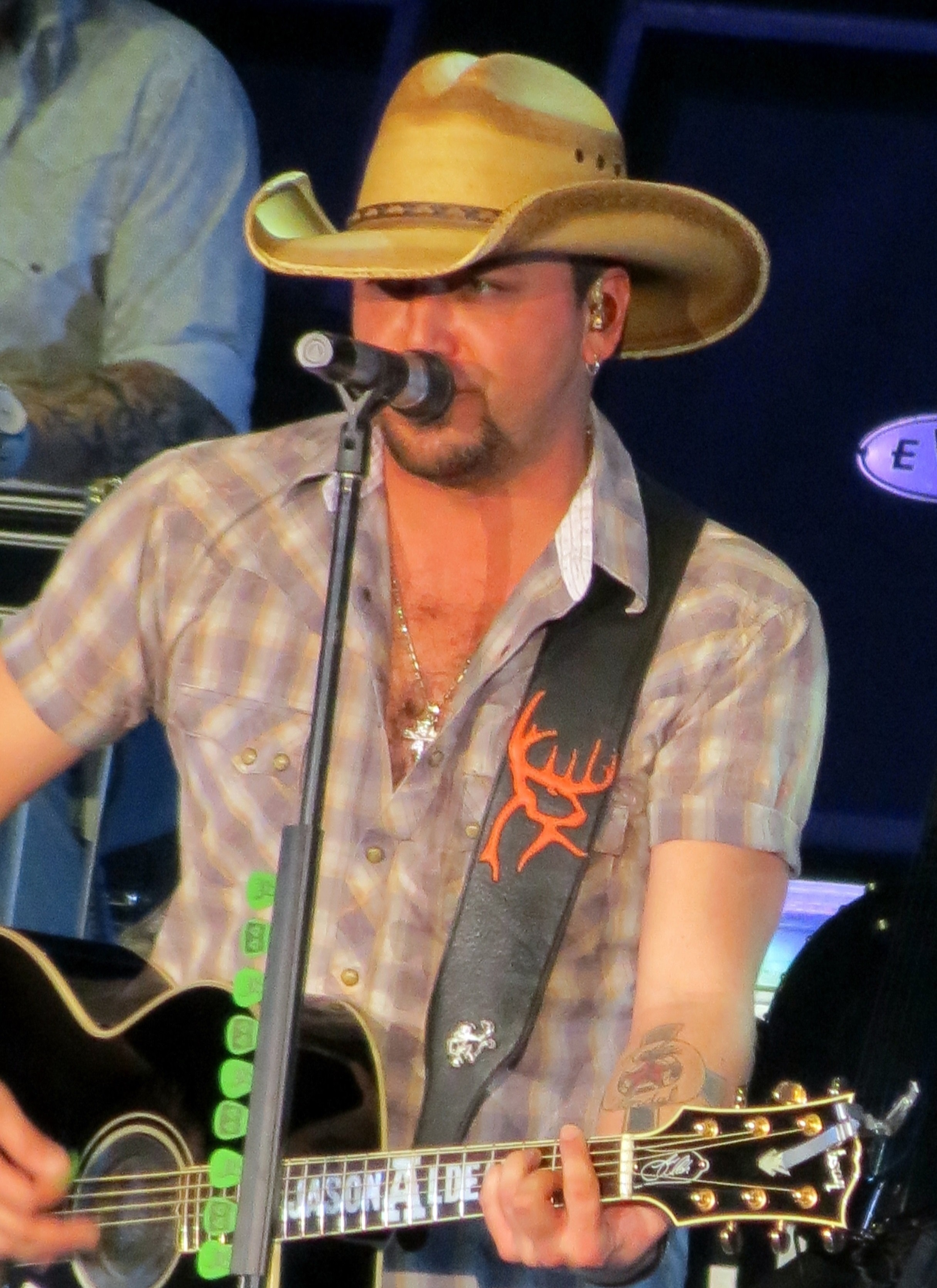
Jason Aldean was another first-time chart-topper with Relentless.

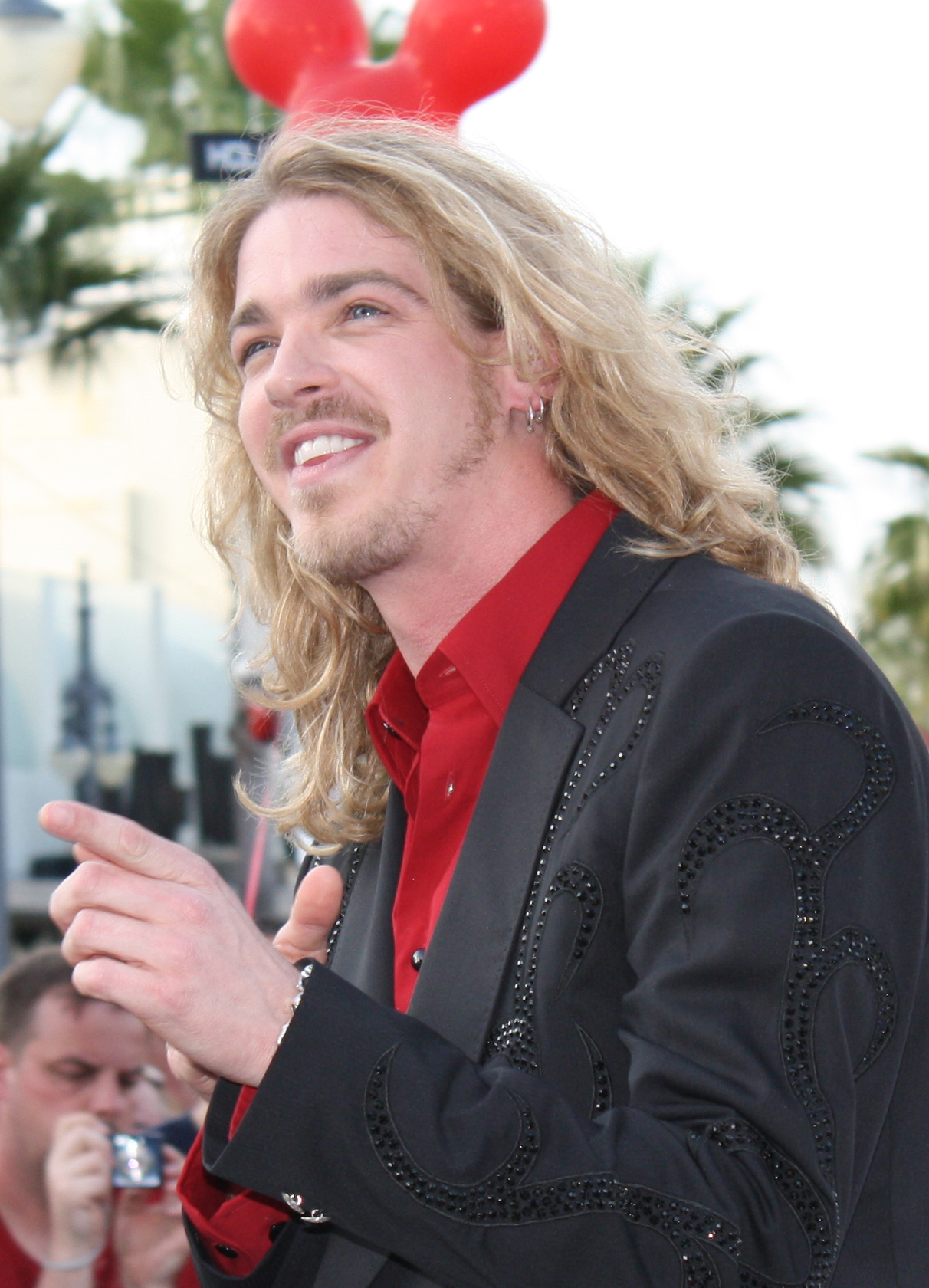
Former American Idol finalist Bucky Covington reached number one with his eponymous album.

Issue date	Title	Artist(s)	Ref.
January 6	Some Hearts	Carrie Underwood	
January 13	Some Hearts	Carrie Underwood	
January 20	Me and My Gang	Rascal Flatts	
January 27	Me and My Gang	Rascal Flatts	
February 3	Some Hearts	Carrie Underwood	
February 10	Some Hearts	Carrie Underwood	
February 17	Totally Country Vol. 6	Various Artists	
February 24	Waitin' in the Country	Jason Michael Carroll	
March 3	Taking the Long Way	Dixie Chicks	
March 10	Taking the Long Way	Dixie Chicks	
March 17	Taking the Long Way	Dixie Chicks	
March 24	Greatest Hits	Gary Allan	
March 31	Some Hearts	Carrie Underwood	
April 7	Some Hearts	Carrie Underwood	
April 14	Let It Go	Tim McGraw	
April 21	Let It Go	Tim McGraw	
April 28	Let It Go	Tim McGraw	
May 5	Bucky Covington	Bucky Covington	
May 12	Some Hearts	Carrie Underwood	
May 19	Crazy Ex-Girlfriend	Miranda Lambert	
May 26	Some Hearts	Carrie Underwood	
June 2	One of the Boys	Gretchen Wilson	
June 9	Some Hearts	Carrie Underwood	
June 16	Relentless	Jason Aldean	
June 23	Between Raising Hell and Amazing Grace	Big & Rich	
June 30	Big Dog Daddy	Toby Keith	
July 7	5th Gear	Brad Paisley	
July 14	5th Gear	Brad Paisley	
July 21	5th Gear	Brad Paisley	
July 28	5th Gear	Brad Paisley	
August 4	Taylor Swift	Taylor Swift	
August 11	Taylor Swift	Taylor Swift	
August 18	Taylor Swift	Taylor Swift	
August 25	Taylor Swift	Taylor Swift	
September 1	Taylor Swift	Taylor Swift	
September 8	Taylor Swift	Taylor Swift	
September 15	Taylor Swift	Taylor Swift	
September 22	Taylor Swift	Taylor Swift	
September 29	Just Who I Am: Poets & Pirates	Kenny Chesney	
October 6	Reba: Duets	Reba McEntire	
October 13	Still Feels Good	Rascal Flatts	
October 20	Still Feels Good	Rascal Flatts	
October 27	Still Feels Good	Rascal Flatts	
November 3	Still Feels Good	Rascal Flatts	
November 10	Carnival Ride	Carrie Underwood	
November 17	Long Road Out of Eden	Eagles	
November 24	Long Road Out of Eden	Eagles	
December 1	The Ultimate Hits	Garth Brooks	
December 8	The Ultimate Hits	Garth Brooks	
December 15	Long Road Out of Eden	Eagles	
December 22	Long Road Out of Eden	Eagles	
December 29	Long Road Out of Eden	Eagles	
