= Doin' Somethin' Right =

Studio album by Billy Currington
- Released: October 18, 2005
- Recorded: 2005
- Genre: Country
- Length: 40:14
- Label: Mercury Nashville
- Producer: Carson Chamberlain

Billy Currington chronology
Billy Currington (2003)	Doin' Somethin' Right (2005)	Little Bit of Everything (2008)

Singles from Doin' Somethin' Right
- 1. "Must Be Doin' Somethin' Right" Released: May 30, 2005; 2. "Why, Why, Why" Released: February 27, 2006; 3. "Good Directions" Released: September 25, 2006

Professional ratings
Review scores
Source	Rating
AllMusic	4.5/5 stars
Stylus Magazine	B−

Doin' Somethin' Right is the second studio album by American country music singer Billy Currington. It was released in October 2005 via Mercury Records Nashville. The album produced three singles with the songs "Must Be Doin' Somethin' Right", "Why, Why, Why", and "Good Directions", which peaked at numbers 1, 13, and 1, respectively, on the U.S. Billboard Hot Country Songs chart. The album has also been certified two-times platinum by the Recording Industry Association of America (RIAA). Also included on this album is a cover of Kenny Rogers' hit single "Lucille".

== Track listing ==
No.	Title	Writer(s)	Length
1.	"I Wanna Be a Hillbilly"	Brett Jones	3:06
2.	"Good Directions"	Rachel Thibodeau, Luke Bryan	3:35
3.	"Must Be Doin' Somethin' Right"	Marty Dodson, Patrick Jason Matthews	4:29
4.	"Why, Why, Why"	Mark Nesler, Billy Currington, Tony Martin	2:45
5.	"That Changes Everything"	David Lee, Tony Lane	3:49
6.	"Little Bit Lonely"	Brett James, Blair Daly	3:46
7.	"She's Got a Way with Me"	Michael McDonald, Currington	4:46
8.	"Lucille"	Hal Bynum, Roger Bowling	4:08
9.	"Whole Lot More"	Carson Chamberlain, Currington	2:31
10.	"Here I Am"	Chamberlain, Currington	3:41
11.	"She Knows What to Do with a Saturday Night"	Gary Nicholson, Trent Summar	3:38

== Personnel ==
- Eddie Bayers - drums (all tracks)
- Billy Currington - lead vocals (all tracks)
- Smith Curry - pedabro (track 2), lap steel guitar (tracks 1,9)
- Chip Davis - background vocals (tracks 3,7,10)
- Stuart Duncan - fiddle (all tracks except 3,6,7), mandolin (tracks 3,6,7)
- Paul Franklin - steel guitar (tracks 3,5,6,7,8,10), lap steel guitar (track 11)
- Wes Hightower - background vocals (tracks 1,2,4,5,8,9,11)
- Brett James - background vocals (track 6)
- Brent Mason - electric guitar (tracks 3,4,5,6,7,8,11)
- Michael McDonald - piano (track 7), background vocals (track 7)
- Glen Mitchell - electric guitar (track 1,2,9,10)
- Gary Prim - keyboards (all tracks except 3 & 7), organ (track 7), piano (track 3), strings (track 3)
- Scotty Sanders - dobro (track 4)
- W. David Smith - bass guitar (tracks 3,4,5,6,7,8,11)
- John Willis - acoustic guitar (all tracks), banjo (track 4)
- Glenn Worf - bass guitar (tracks 1,2,9,10)

== Chart performance ==
=== Weekly charts ===
Chart (2005)	Peak position
US Billboard 200	11
US Top Country Albums (Billboard)	2

=== Year-end charts ===
Chart (2005)	Position
US Top Country Albums (Billboard)	66
Chart (2006)	Position
US Billboard 200	111
US Top Country Albums (Billboard)	24
Chart (2007)	Position
US Top Country Albums (Billboard)	46

=== Singles ===
Year	Single	Peak chart positions			
Year	Single	US Country	US	US Pop	CAN
2005	"Must Be Doin' Somethin' Right"	1	39	63	—
2006	"Why, Why, Why"	13	99	—	—
2006	"Good Directions"	1	42	66	67
"—" denotes releases that did not chart

== Certifications ==
Certifications for Doin' Something Right
Region	Certification	Certified units/sales
United States (RIAA)	2× Platinum	2,000,000^{‡}
^{‡} Sales+streaming figures based on certification alone.
