= Bucky Covington (album) =

Studio album by Bucky Covington
- Released: April 17, 2007
- Genre: Country
- Length: 41:11
- Label: Lyric Street Records
- Producer: Mark Miller

Bucky Covington chronology
Bucky Covington (2007)	Good Guys (2012)

Singles from Bucky Covington
- 1. "A Different World" Released: January 16, 2007; 2. "It's Good to Be Us" Released: September 10, 2007; 3. "I'll Walk" Released: April 28, 2008

Bucky Covington is the debut studio album by American country music artist of the same name. It was released on April 17, 2007 by Lyric Street Records. It produced three singles — "A Different World", "It's Good to Be Us", and "I'll Walk" — all of which were top 20 hits on the Billboard Hot Country Songs chart. The song "Empty Handed" was also featured in the video game NASCAR 08. Reviews for the record were positive to mixed, with critics divided over the production, lyrical content and Covington's performance. To promote the album, Covington co-headlined with Jason Michael Carroll on a tour across the United States.

== Album background ==
The album was produced by Mark Miller, lead singer of the country music band Sawyer Brown, and recorded in Nashville, Tennessee. Two other members of Sawyer Brown — Gregg "Hobie" Hubbard and Jim Scholten — also contribute on background vocals and bass guitar, respectively.

== Singles and promotion ==
The lead single from Bucky Covington, "A Different World", was released on January 16, 2007 and peaked at numbers six and 58 on the Billboard Hot Country Songs and Hot 100 charts, respectively. An accompanying music video was directed by Trey Fanjoy and premiered in February 2007. The album's second single, "It's Good to Be Us", was released on September 10, 2007 and reached numbers 11 and 81 on the Billboard Hot Country Songs and Hot 100 charts, respectively. Its music video was directed by Fanjoy and premiered in October 2007. The third and final single, "I'll Walk", was released on April 28, 2008 and peaked at numbers 10 and 70 on the Billboard Hot Country Songs and Hot 100 charts, respectively. On October 25, 2007 Covington teamed with Jason Michael Carroll to co-headline a tour called the Raisin' The Bar tour, starting that day at the Concrete Street Amphitheater in Corpus Christi, Texas, and ending on December 8 in Baltimore's Rams Head Live! venue.

== Reception ==
Professional ratings
Review scores
Source	Rating
AllMusic	3.5/5 stars
Engine 145	3/5 stars
Entertainment Weekly	B+

Bucky Covington received positive to mixed reviews from music critics. AllMusic's Stephen Thomas Erlewine noted that the record was "country music with anthemic pop hooks and a rock edge" marketed towards "the middle-American and Southern fans" that voted for Covington on American Idol but praised it for being "effective" and helping Covington sound like "a genuine modern country singer" that's confident in his vocalization and storytelling, concluding that: "Ultimately, Bucky Covington is the sound of a Nashville pro like Mark Miller translating Bucky's TV persona onto record: it may be slick and calculating, but there's pleasure in that professionalism and, thanks to Bucky, there's a ring of truth to the album. After all, Bucky is still enough of a good old Southern boy to be likeable no matter how slick his surroundings are. He may not be driving the car, but he's on the ride of his life and he's enjoying every second of it." Mandi Bierly of Entertainment Weekly called it a "versatile debut", concluding that: "While we acknowledge his softer side, it's the tracks with teeth-grinding bravado bubbling below the surface ("Back When We Were Gods") or boiling over ("The Bible and the Belt") that make us believers. Sing those hillbilly blues, son."

Brady Vercher of Engine 145 wrote that the producers should've played to Covington's strength and supplied him with more southern rock tracks like "American Friday Night" and "Back When We Were Gods", despite giving praise to "I'll Walk" and "It's Good to Be Us" for being solid offerings with different sounds, concluding that: "Overall, the album seems to be Bucky's tribute to the styles of country music that he loves; it was all over the place. The problem is that he doesn't do a good job of letting people know who he is or what they can expect from him." C. Eric Banister of Country Standard Time felt it was an "uneven debut" that suppresses Covington's personality with "broad stroke generic" tracks ("I'll Walk") but gave praise to the "mid-tempo straight new country numbers" ("Carolina Blue") and "straight-up Southern rockers" ("Ain't No Thing", "Empty Handed") for allowing Covington's vocal strengths to shine and show potential, concluding that: "In an industry that is becoming more about instant gratification through immediate success, the powers ought to allow Covington to continue to grow as an artist and come into his own."

Bucky Covington debuted at number four on the US Billboard 200 and atop the Top Country Albums chart, selling 61,000 copies in its first week. At the time, it was the best opening week for a debut album by a male on the country charts since Billy Ray Cyrus' 1992 debut Some Gave All, but was later surpassed by fellow American Idol alumni Danny Gokey's 2010 debut My Best Days which sold 65,000 copies in its first week. On the Billboard 200, the album left the top 100 on the week of September 8, 2007, spending 22 weeks on the chart. The album has sold 427,000 copies as of March 2011.

== Track listing ==
No.	Title	Writer(s)	Length
1.	"American Friday Night"	Tom Douglas	3:21
2.	"A Different World"	Mark Nesler; Jennifer Hanson; Tony Martin	3:28
3.	"I'll Walk"	Brent Wilson; Lonnie Fowler	3:30
4.	"Back When We Were Gods"	Ward Davis; Dan Murph	3:31
5.	"Ain't No Thing"	John Scott Sherrill; Chris Stapleton	4:19
6.	"I'm Good"	Nesler; Marty Dodson	3:03
7.	"Empty Handed"	Kip Raines; Stapleton	3:27
8.	"Hometown"	Chris Tompkins; Mark Irwin; Josh Kear	3:25
9.	"It's Good to Be Us"	Dave Berg; Tim James	3:04
10.	"Carolina Blue"	Gregg Hubbard; Mark Miller; Bucky Covington	3:52
11.	"The Bible and the Belt"	Marc Beeson; Tim Gates; Billy Austin	3:39

== Personnel ==
Adapted from the album's liner notes.

- Robert Bailey – background vocals
- Bucky Covington – lead vocals
- Dan Dugmore – steel guitar
- Vicki Hampton – background vocals
- Aubrey Haynie – fiddle
- Gregg "Hobie" Hubbard – background vocals
- Bobby Huff – drums, percussion, background vocals
- Blair Masters – piano, keyboard, Hammond organ
- Pat McGrath – acoustic guitar (on "I'll Walk")
- Dale Oliver – acoustic guitar, electric guitar, Dobro, mandolin
- Russ Pahl – acoustic guitar, steel guitar
- John Wesley Ryles – background vocals
- Jim Scholten – bass guitar

== Charts ==
=== Weekly charts ===
Weekly chart performance for Bucky Covington
Chart (2007)	Peak position
US Billboard 200	4
US Top Country Albums (Billboard)	1

=== Year-end charts ===
Year-end chart performance for Bucky Covington in 2007
Chart (2007)	Position
US Billboard 200	187
US Top Country Albums (Billboard)	37
