= I'll Sleep When I'm Dead =

I'll Sleep When I'm Dead may refer to:

- "I'll Sleep When I'm Dead", a song from Warren Zevon
  - I'll Sleep When I'm Dead (An Anthology), a Warren Zevon compilation album
  - I'll Sleep When I'm Dead: The Dirty Life and Times of Warren Zevon, a biography of Warren Zevon
- "I'll Sleep When I'm Dead" (Bon Jovi song)
- I'll Sleep When I'm Dead (2003 film), a British crime drama
- I'll Sleep When I'm Dead (2016 film), a documentary about American DJ Steve Aoki

== See also ==
- "Sleep When I'm Dead", a 2008 song by The Cure
- "I Can Sleep When I'm Dead", a 2008 song by Jason Michael Carroll
- I'll Sleep When You're Dead, a 2007 album by El-P
