= Logan Mize =

American singer-songwriter

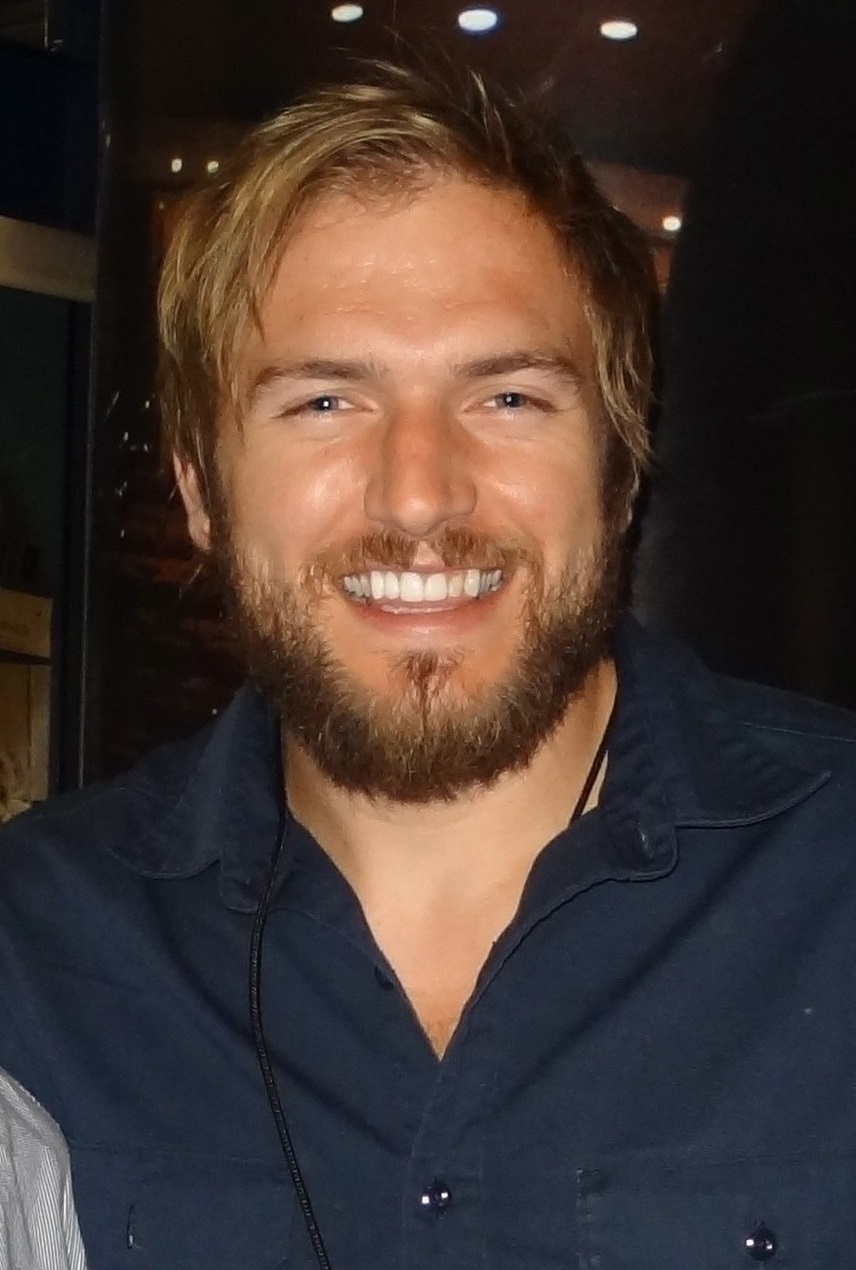
- Logan Mize (photo by Sydney Davidson)

Background information
- Origin: Clearwater, Kansas, USA
- Genres: Country
- Years active: 2000–present
- Labels: Big Yellow Dog Music, Arista Nashville
- Spouse: Jill Martin (m. 2010)
- Website: http://loganmize.com/

Logan Mize is a country music artist/songwriter from Clearwater, Kansas signed to Big Yellow Dog Music.

== Music career ==
In April 2010, several years after moving to Nashville, Mize signed a publishing/record deal with Big Yellow Dog Music and a booking deal with William Morris Endeavor followed in August 2010. Mize has received air play as a "Highway Find" on satellite radio channel The Highway (Sirius XM). Logan has also experienced success as a songwriter, notably when country music singer Bucky Covington recorded his song “Mexicoma” on his album Good Guys, which charted to No. 30 on Billboard Country Albums and No.43 on Billboard Independent Albums. Logan's TV features include the “Fabric of Life” Cotton commercial alongside Hayden Panettiere and in the CW series, “Hart of Dixie", which featured both Logan and his band.

In 2012, Mize's second album, Nobody in Nashville (released on Big Yellow Dog Music), charted to No. 49 on Billboard Country Albums and No. 15 on Billboard Heatseekers Albums. Mize has opened for multiple headlining acts including Lady Antebellum, The Band Perry, Leann Rimes, Eric Church, Dierks Bentley, Charlie Daniels Band, Blake Shelton (on the Blake Shelton Country Cruise), Stoney LaRue, Hank Williams and a special tribute with Merle Haggard. In the fall of 2013, Logan accompanied Leann Rimes on her UK tour in Glasgow, London, Birmingham, and Manchester.

On July 28, 2017, Mize released another album, Come Back Road. A single from the album "Ain't Always Pretty" was first released in 2016 and received over 20 million streams on Spotify. He released his 2021 concept album Welcome to Prairieville with Blake Chaffin and his wife Jill Martin.

Mize has over 350 million catalog streams across all platforms. His single, Better Off Gone, is RIAA Certified Gold and has over 100 million streams.

== Personal life ==
Mize married Jill Martin in 2010.

His great uncle was Billy Mize, largely known for crafting and evolving the legendary Bakersfield sound, which included musical pioneers Merle Haggard and Buck Owens.

== Discography ==
=== Studio albums ===
Title	Details	Peak chart positions			Sales
Title	Details	US Country	US Heat	US Indie	Sales
Logan Mize	Release date: May 5, 2009; Label: June Harvest Music	—	—	—	
Nobody in Nashville	Release date: March 13, 2012; Label: Big Yellow Dog Music	49	15	—	
Come Back Road	Release date: July 28, 2017; Label: Big Yellow Dog Music	—	6	19	US: 1,600
Still That Kid	Release date: January 27, 2021; Label: Big Yellow Dog Music	—	—	—	
Welcome to Prairieville	Release date: October 1, 2021; Label: Big Yellow Dog Music	—	—	—	
"—" denotes releases that did not chart

=== Extended plays ===
Title	Details	Peak chart positions		Sales
Title	Details	US Country	US Heat	Sales
Pawn Shop Guitar	Release date: May 19, 2015; Label: Arista Nashville	32	14	US: 1,400
Acoustic Sessions	Release date: September 28, 2018; Label: Big Yellow Dog Music	—	—	
From the Vault	Release date: May 17, 2019; Label: Big Yellow Dog Music	—	—	
Prairie Tapes, Vol. 1	Release date: October 14, 2022; Label: Big Yellow Dog Music	—	—	
Bloodline	Release date: May 5, 2023; Label: Big Yellow Dog Music	—	—	

=== Singles ===
Year	Single	Peak positions			Certifications	Album
Year	Single	US Country	US Country Airplay	US Country Digital	Certifications	Album
2015	"Can't Get Away from a Good Time"	—	58	—		Pawn Shop Guitar
2016	"Ain't Always Pretty"	39	—	16		Come Back Road
2019	"Better Off Gone"	—	49	—	RIAA: Gold	Come Back Road
"—" denotes releases that did not chart

=== Music videos ===
Year	Video	Director
2014	"Used Up"	Nick Barton
2014	"Can't Get Away from a Good Time" (version 1)	Taylor Smith
2015	"Can't Get Away from a Good Time" (version 2)	Darrin Dickerson
2018	"Somebody To Thank"	
2018	"Better Off Gone"	
2018	"I Remember Everything"	
