= Preludes: Rare and Unreleased Recordings =

Compilation album by Warren Zevon
- Released: May 1, 2007
- Recorded: Pre-1976
- Genre: Rock
- Length: 86:34
- Label: New West
- Producer: Peter Jesperson, Jordan Zevon, Cameron Strang, Danny Goldberg

Warren Zevon chronology
Reconsider Me: The Love Songs (2006)	Preludes: Rare and Unreleased Recordings (2007)

Professional ratings
Review scores
Source	Rating
Allmusic	4/5 stars
The Austin Chronicle	4/5 stars
Gaffa	4/6 stars
Now	5/5 stars
Örnsköldsviks Allehanda	3/5 stars
The Philadelphia Inquirer	A−
PopMatters	7/10
Record Collector	4/5 stars

Preludes: Rare and Unreleased Recordings is a two-CD compilation of music and interviews, including unreleased outtakes and demos, by singer-songwriter Warren Zevon, who died in 2003.

A few months after Zevon's death, his son, Jordan, drove out to one of his father's storage spaces in the San Fernando Valley to begin the process of sorting through old recordings. He discovered over one hundred unreleased outtakes and demos in a piano-sized touring case.

Preludes features sixteen of the newly discovered recordings, including six tracks never before released on any Warren Zevon album: "Empty Hearted Town", "Going All the Way", "Steady Rain", "Stop Rainin' Lord", "Studebaker" and "The Rosarita Beach Café". All of the songs were recorded before 1976. The album also includes previously unreleased versions of "Werewolves of London" and "Accidentally Like a Martyr". The second disc includes a radio interview with Zevon, conducted by Jody Denberg in 2000.

The album was released by New West Records in 2007 in a deluxe two-CD package in a hardbound slipcase. It includes a 44-page booklet with previously unpublished family photos, integrated with excerpts from the memoir I'll Sleep When I'm Dead: The Dirty Life and Times of Warren Zevon by Crystal Zevon.

== Track listing ==
All songs by Warren Zevon unless otherwise noted.

=== Disc one ===
1. "Empty Hearted Town" – 3:04
2. "Steady Rain" – 4:18
3. "Join Me in L.A." – 2:27
4. "Hasten Down the Wind" – 2:30
5. "Werewolves of London" (LeRoy Marinell, Waddy Wachtel, Zevon) – 3:36
6. "Tule's Blues" – 3:02
7. "The French Inhaler" – 3:31
8. "Going All the Way" – 2:15
9. "Poor Poor Pitiful Me" – 3:09
10. "Studebaker" – 2:34
11. "Accidentally Like a Martyr" – 3:05
12. "Carmelita" – 3:56
13. "I Used to Ride So High" – 2:43
14. "Stop Rainin' Lord" – 2:11
15. "The Rosarita Beach Café" – 4:08
16. "Desperados Under the Eaves" – 3:44
  Special edition bonus tracks
17. "Workin' Man's Pay" – 2:04
18. "Frozen Notes" – 1:42
19. "Some Kind of Rider" – 3:21

=== Disc two ===
1. "I Was in the House When the House Burned Down" – 3:02
2. "Discourse – Warren waxes and wanes on songwriting, Los Angeles, modern classical music, the early days of his career and playing the guitar versus the piano" – 7:14
3. "Discourse – Musings on mortality, song noir, religion in his music and the King of Rock n' Roll" – 5:07
4. "Discourse – A chat about the producers of Life'll Kill Ya, the album's stark sound and other singers covering his songs" – 5:09
5. "Back in the High Life Again" (Will Jennings, Steve Winwood) – 3:11
6. "Discourse – His take on Steve Winwood's classic, the split personality, images and inspirations in his compositions" – 3:58
7. "Discourse – His feelings about the Rhino Records 2 CD Anthology of his work, the size of his audience, having his music used on TV shows and movies, acting, performing and the response to "Don't Let Us Get Sick"" – 5:14
8. "Don't Let Us Get Sick" (solo acoustic) – 3:10
- "I Was in the House When the House Burned Down" and "Back in the High Life Again" are taken from Life'll Kill Ya (2000).
- "Don't Let Us Get Sick" was recorded live December 3, 1999, at Austin City Limits Studios for 107.1 KGSR Radio Austin 9th Anniversary Concert; previously unreleased.

== Production ==
Credits are adapted from the album liner notes.

- Peter Jesperson – compilation producer
- Jordan Zevon – executive producer, family photos
- Cameron Strang – executive producer
- Danny Goldberg – executive producer
- Gavin Lurssen – mastering at Lurssen Mastering, Hollywood, California
- Crystal Zevon – family photos
- Susie Delaney – still life photography
- Kat Delaney – art direction, design
- Ken Anderson – legal

Disc two

- Jody Denberg – producer, interviewer
- Diane Gentile – project coordinator
- Marty Quinn – engineer at Quad Recording Studios, New York City
- Jerry Taub – mastering at Terra Nova Digital Audio, Austin, Texas
- Bill Johnson – mastering at Terra Nova Digital Audio; engineer on "Don't Let Us Get Sick"
- Paul Q. Kolderie – producer, engineer on "I Was in the House When the House Burned Down" and "Back in the High Life Again"
- Sean Slade – producer, engineer on "I Was in the House When the House Burned Down" and "Back in the High Life Again"
