= Songs from St. Somewhere =

Studio album by Jimmy Buffett
- Released: August 20, 2013
- Length: 60:05
- Label: Mailboat
- Producer: Mac McAnally; Michael Utley

Jimmy Buffett chronology
Buffet Hotel (2009)	Songs from St. Somewhere (2013)	'Tis the SeaSon (2016)

Songs from St. Somewhere is the twenty-eighth studio album by American singer-songwriter Jimmy Buffett, released on August 20, 2013, by Mailboat Records.

== Critical reception ==
Professional ratings
Review scores
Source	Rating
AllMusic	2.5/5 stars
The Oakland Press	2.5/4 stars
Rolling Stone	3/5 stars

Gary Graff of The Oakland Press said that the album was not of the same caliber as its predecessor, but added that it was "a perfectly fine fix between boat drinks for any Parrothead worth his or her feathers." Stephen Thomas Erlewine of AllMusic opined that the album was "perfectly fine" for a listener who's drunk, but for those "listening to this sober, it's quite likely you'll be more inclined to cringe than to smile." Jon Dolan of Rolling Stone felt the album was "full of chill evocations of island life."

== Commercial performance ==
The album debuted at No. 4 on the Billboard 200 chart, with first-week sales of 60,388 copies in the United States.

== Track listing ==
No.	Title	Writer(s)	Length
1.	"Somethin' 'Bout a Boat"	Django Walker; Dave Berg; Patrick Davis; Jedd Hughes; James Otto; Eric Paslay	2:44
2.	"Einstein Was a Surfer"	Jimmy Buffett; Mac McAnally	4:41
3.	"Earl's Dead - Cadillac for Sale"	Buffett	5:41
4.	"Too Drunk to Karaoke" (with Toby Keith)	Buffett; McAnally; Shawn Camp; Pat McLaughin	4:02
5.	"Serpentine"	Buffett; McAnally	4:43
6.	"Useless But Important Information"	Buffett; McAnally	4:12
7.	"I Want to Go Back to Cartagena"	Buffett; Peter Mayer; Roger Guth; Will Kimbrough	3:15
8.	"Soulfully"	Kimbrough	3:16
9.	"Rue de la Guitare"	Buffett	3:23
10.	"I'm No Russian"	Buffett	6:40
11.	"Tides"	Buffett; Guth	4:12
12.	"The Rocket That Grandpa Rode"	Buffett; McAnally; Kimbrough; Mayer; Guth	4:02
13.	"I Wave Bye Bye"	Jesse Winchester	3:19
14.	"Colour of the Sun"	Buffett; McAnally; Mayer; Guth	3:48
15.	"Oldest Surfer on the Beach"	Mark Knopfler	4:17
16.	"I Want to Go Back to Cartagena" (with Fanny Lu) (Spanish version)	Buffett; Mayer; Guth; Kimbrough	3:12
Total length:			60:05

== Personnel ==
The Coral Reefers

- Jimmy Buffett – vocals, guitar
- Eric Darken – percussion
- Robert Greenidge – steel drums
- Doyle Grisham – pedal steel guitar
- Tina Gullickson – vocals
- Roger Guth – drums
- John Lovell – trumpet
- Jim Mayer – vocals, bass guitar
- Peter Mayer – guitar
- Mac McAnally – vocals, guitar
- Nadirah Shakoor – vocals
- Michael Utley – keyboards

Additional musicians

- Will Kimbrough – vocals
- Mark Knopfler – guitar on "Oldest Surfer on the Beach"

== Chart positions ==
Chart (2013)	Peak position
Canadian Albums (Billboard)	22
US Billboard 200	4
US Independent Albums (Billboard)	1
