= Growing Up Is Getting Old =

Growing Up Is Getting Old may refer to:

- Growing Up Is Getting Old (album), 2009 album by American singer Jason Michael Carroll
- "Growing Up Is Getting Old" (song), 2021 song by Bulgarian singer Victoria Georgieva
- "Growing Up Is Getting Old", 2024 song by Teddy Swims from the reissue of I've Tried Everything but Therapy (Part 1)
