= Numbers (Jason Michael Carroll album) =

Studio album by Jason Michael Carroll
- Released: July 25, 2011
- Genre: Country
- Label: Cracker Barrel
- Producer: Patrick Davis, Mark Dearnley, Jason Michael Carroll

Jason Michael Carroll chronology
Growing Up Is Getting Old (2009)	Numbers (2011)	What Color Is Your Sky (2015)

Singles from Numbers
- 1. "Numbers" Released: March 28, 2011; 2. "Meet Me in the Barn" Released: December 2011; 3. "Let Me" Released: December 2012

Numbers is the third studio album released by country music artist Jason Michael Carroll. It is Carroll's first album since he split up with Arista Nashville. It was released on July 25, 2011 by Cracker Barrel stores.

== Content ==
The first single from the album was the title track, which was the only song on the album Carroll did not write or co-write. With a peak of number 60 on the Billboard Hot Country Songs charts, the song became the first single of Carroll's career to miss the top 40. Also included on the album is "Alyssa Lies," a number 5 hit from his debut album Waitin' in the Country.

== Track listing ==
The track listing was announced by Cracker Barrel on March 28, 2011.

No.	Title	Writer(s)	Length
1.	"This Is for the Lonely"	Jason Michael Carroll, Tommy Lee James, Terry McBride	3:50
2.	"Numbers"	Rodney Clawson, Patrick Davis	3:30
3.	"Ray of Hope"	Carroll, Josh Thompson	3:23
4.	"Meet Me in the Barn"	Carroll, Dallas Davidson, Davis	3:16
5.	"Hell or Hallelujah"	Carroll, Luke Laird, Jeremy Spillman	3:34
6.	"Can I Get an Amen"	Carroll, Rivers Rutherford, George Teren	3:44
7.	"My Favorite"	Carroll, Davis, Connors	3:29
8.	"Don't Know Why"	Carroll, Kelley Lovelace, Tom Shapiro	3:45
9.	"Let Me"	Carroll, Dave Berg	3:57
10.	"Stray"	Carroll, Radney Foster	4:39
11.	"Last Word"	Carroll, David Fraiser, David Lee	4:27
12.	"Alyssa Lies"	Carroll	4:21

== Chart performance ==
=== Album ===
Chart (2011)	Peak position
US Billboard 200	198
US Billboard Top Country Albums	33
US Billboard Top Independent Albums	37

=== Singles ===
Year	Single	Peak positions
Year	Single	US Country
2011	"Numbers"	60
2011	"Meet Me in the Barn"	—
2011	"Let Me"	—
"—" denotes releases that did not chart
