= A Different World (song) =

Single by Bucky Covington

from the album Bucky Covington
- Released: January 16, 2007
- Recorded: 2006
- Genre: Country
- Length: 3:28
- Label: Lyric Street
- Songwriters: Jennifer Hanson; Tony Martin; Mark Nesler
- Producer: Mark Miller

Bucky Covington singles chronology
"A Different World" (2007)	"It's Good to Be Us" (2007)

Music video
- "A Different World" on YouTube

"A Different World" is a debut song recorded by American country music artist Bucky Covington. It was released in January 2007 as the lead single from his album Bucky Covington. It was written by Jennifer Hanson, Tony Martin, and Mark Nesler. The song is produced by Mark Miller of Sawyer Brown, and was released by Lyric Street Records, a country label of Disney's Buena Vista Music Group. It peaked at number 6 on the U.S. Billboard Hot Country Songs chart.

== Content ==
The song is a reminiscence of the narrator's formative years, its lyrics describing how much the world has changed since his childhood. Examples abound of how mothers "smoked and drank" during pregnancy, lead-based paint was available, children drank water out of garden hoses and rode bicycles without helmets or other safety equipment, parents physically disciplined their children when they misbehaved, towns had only one youth baseball team (per age group) and would-be players didn't always make the team ... and so on.

Covington states during the chorus that it was "not just a different time / It was a different world".

== Music video ==
A music video was released in February 15, 2007, and was directed by Trey Fanjoy. It begins with Covington as a child (J.D. Ironfield), sitting in front of an old television. On the TV is the adult version of Covington, who is on the patio of a house. Throughout the video, the young Covington watches his older counterpart on the TV as the adult version of him walks around a small town, supposedly like the town he grew up in. Certain children in the town are shown leading a simpler life than most do today, as the song's lyrics describe. The video ends with the adult Covington entering the house where the young version of him is watching. It then shows him as an adult shutting off a modern-day television.

== Chart performance ==
Chart (2007)	Peak position
US Hot Country Songs (Billboard)	6
US Billboard Hot 100	58
US Billboard Pop 100	68

=== Year-end charts ===
Chart (2007)	Position
US Country Songs (Billboard)	34
