= Zane Williams =

American country music singer (born 1977)

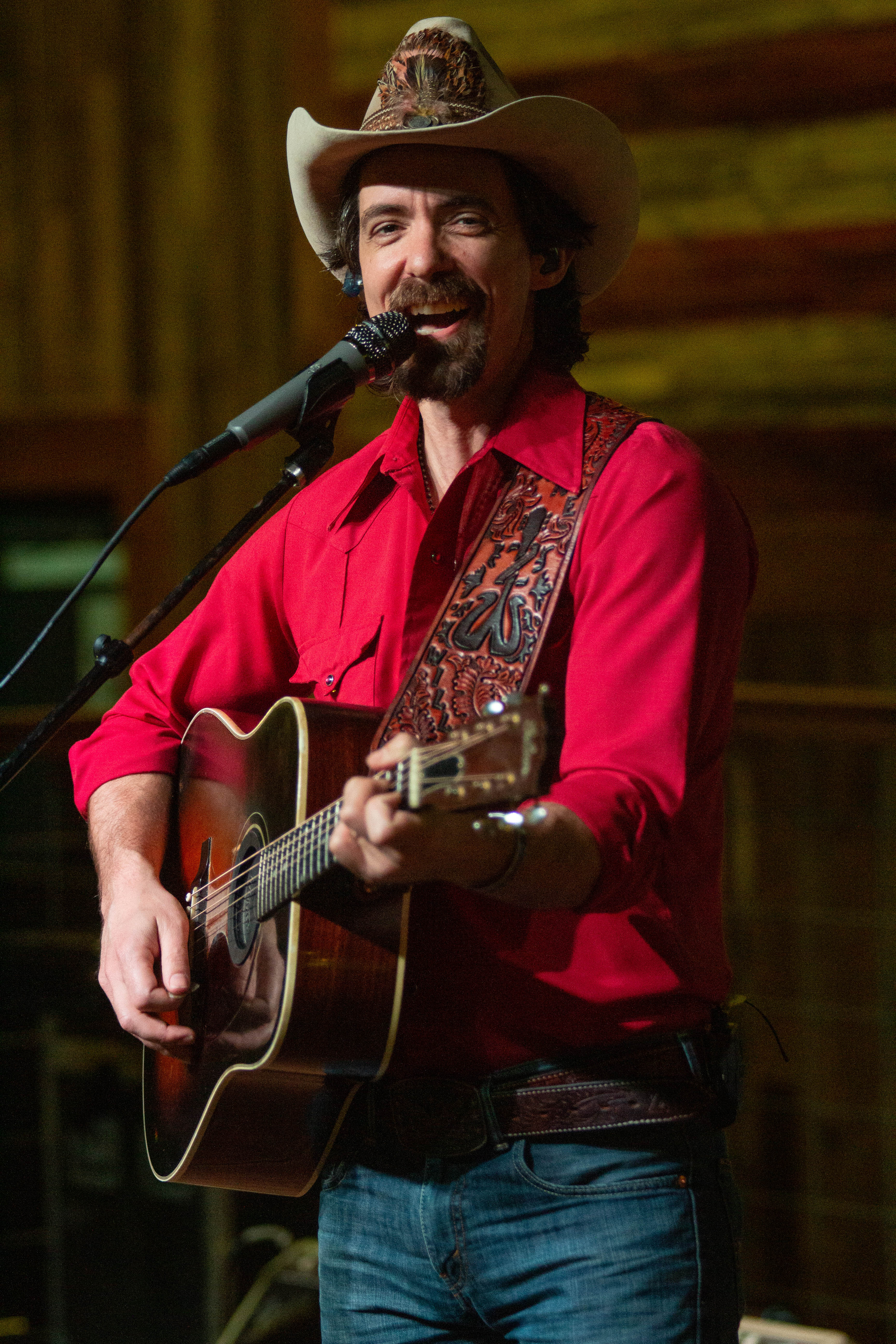
- Williams performing at the Republic Country Club & BBQ in Stafford, Texas, February 2019

Background information
- Born: Abilene, Texas
- Genres: Country
- Occupation: Singer-songwriter
- Instruments: Guitar; accordion
- Labels: Hack Circle Records; Be Music; Texas Like That Records; Hill Country Music LLC

Zane Williams (born 1977) is an American country music singer. He has released seven solo albums and is a member of the Americana band “The Wilder Blue”.

== Career ==
Zane Williams is an anomaly in today's country music scene, a modern-day “throwback” who is equal parts barroom entertainer and introspective poet. He was a finalist in three categories at MerleFest's Chris Austin Song Contest, claiming top slots in both the Country and General categories. "Hurry Home" was selected as the $20,000 Maxell Song of the Year in the John Lennon Songwriting Contest.

Williams released an album, Hurry Home, in 2006. He signed a publishing deal with Big Yellow Dog Music in 2007. The album's title track was released as a single by Jason Michael Carroll in 2009. Williams has toured extensively throughout the United States including Missouri, Alabama, and Texas. In January 2010, he released The Right Place; he co-produced the album with Radney Foster. Jessica Phillips writing for Country Weekly rated the album three-and-a-half stars out of five: "If you're in the mood for true honky-tonk music, you're in the right place." Ride with Me came out in 2011.

Williams has received radio airplay on country stations across Texas leading to his first entry on the Texas Music Chart with "Ride With Me", from the 2011 album with the same title. He was featured in Troubadour Texas, a television show which discussed his career. In June 2013, he released an album titled Overnight Success. He wrote all 11 songs on the album, and co-produced it with Tom Faulkner. The album debuted on Billboard's Heatseekers South Central chart at No. 4. The video for the title track was on CMT Pure's 12-Pack Countdown for three weeks in a row and reached No. 2. The video was on GAC's daily countdown along with The Nashville Network featuring William's "Overnight Success" music video in a Top 10 Rising Stars list.

=== 2015: Texas Like That ===
In 2015 Williams released a studio album, Texas Like That, with 10 songs he wrote. The tracks range from the romantic ballad "She Is" to the toe-tapping "Just Gettin’ Started" and a fan tribute song "Here’s to You". Two tunes which received attention are “Jayton and Jill” and the "Kansas City Sunrise". Texas Like That was released on April 14, 2015, and debuted on Top Country Albums chart at No. 31 and Heatseeker Albums at No.8, his highest-charting album with 1,500 copies sold in its debut week.

=== 2016: Bringin' Country Back ===
In 2016, the title track from his next album, Bringin' Country Back, was released on July 8, 2016, as a single. Williams wrote the 11 songs on the album and produced the album himself. The album was released on October 21, 2016. The album debuted at No. 46 on the Top Country Album chart, and No. 22 on the Heatseekers Album, with 800 copies sold in its debut week.

== Discography ==
=== Albums ===
Title	Album details	Peak chart positions		
Title	Album details	US Country	US Heat	US Indie
Hurry Home	Release date: November 14, 2006; Label: Be Music & Entertainment	—	—	—
The Right Place	Release date: November 1, 2009; Label: BME	—	—	—
Ride with Me	Release date: February 25, 2011; Label: BME	—	—	—
Overnight Success	Release date: June 4, 2013; Label: BME	—	—	—
Texas Like That	Release date: April 14, 2015; Label: BME	31	8	45
Bringin' Country Back	Release date: October 21, 2016; Label: Texas Like That Records	46	22	—
"—" denotes releases that did not chart

=== Music videos ===
Year	Video	Director
2013	"Overnight Success"	Jeff Venable
2015	"Jayton & Jill"	Lindley Atkinson
