= A Father's Love (The Only Way He Knew How) =

Single by Bucky Covington

from the album Good Guys
- Released: March 8, 2010
- Genre: Country
- Length: 3:18
- Label: Lyric Street
- Songwriter(s): Liz Hengber, Thom Sheperd, Steve Williams
- Producer(s): Mark Miller

Bucky Covington singles chronology
"Gotta Be Somebody" (2009)	"A Father's Love (The Only Way He Knew How)" (2010)	"I Wanna Be That Feeling" (2012)

"A Father's Love (The Only Way He Knew How)" is a song written by Liz Hengber, Thom Shepherd and Steve Williams, originally released by Shepherd in 2007 on his album Texas Girls, and was re-recorded by American country music artist Bucky Covington. It was released in March 2010 as his sixth single, and was intended to be included on an album titled I'm Alright, which ultimately went unreleased. It was later released on Covington's second studio album, Good Guys, in 2012.

== Content ==
"A Father's Love (The Only Way He Knew How)" is a country ballad, driven by acoustic guitar and banjo with steel guitar fills. The song's male narrator describes the way his father shows his love for him by doing rather than saying. In the first verse his father spends time making sure his car is tuned up before he leaves for college, and in the second verse he visits his son at his new house and performs maintenance work on it. In the song's bridge, the son visits his father for his sixty-fifth birthday; before he leaves, his father inspects his car once again, showing "a father's love."

== Critical reception ==
Sam Gazdziak of Engine 145 gave the song a thumbs-up, favoring Covington's vocal performance, which he compares to Marty Raybon from Shenandoah. Although Gazdziak felt the song was "predictable", he found the song had its "moments that feel genuine". Matt Bjorke of Roughstock spoke favorably of the song, which he felt was "exactly the kind of song and performance that Bucky Covington needed to come out with to help re-establish himself as a mainstream country music artist." With its "soft acoustic, traditional-based melody" and "tender lyrics," Bjorke noted that it "feels like the kind of song that should be a hit in the hands of any singer." Leeann Ward of Country Universe gave the song a B+ rating, describing Covington's vocals as "both believable and emotive" and noting the "pleasant production that does not shy away from the steel guitar."

== Chart performance ==
"A Father's Love (The Only Way He Knew How)" debuted at number 57 on the U.S. Billboard Hot Country Songs chart for the week of April 10, 2010. The song entered the Top 40 in its fourth week on the charts and peaked at number 23 in July 2010.

Chart performance for "A Father's Love (The Only Way He Knew How)" by Bucky Covington
Chart (2010)	Peak position
US Hot Country Songs (Billboard)	23
US Billboard Bubbling Under Hot 100	22

== Sales ==
Covington's original version of the song sold 31,000 downloads in the United States.

== High Valley version ==
Canadian country music group High Valley covered the song on their 2010 self-titled album. Their version was released as the album's third single on January 24, 2011, and debuted at number 98 on the Canadian Hot 100 for the week of April 16, 2011.

=== Chart performance ===
Chart performance for "A Father's Love (The Only Way He Knew How)" by High Valley
Chart (2011)	Peak position
Canada (Canadian Hot 100)	98
Canada Country (Billboard)	12
