= Good Guys (album) =

Studio album by Bucky Covington
- Released: September 11, 2012
- Genre: Country
- Length: 41:50
- Label: E1 Music
- Producer: Mark Miller, Dale Oliver

Bucky Covington chronology
Bucky Covington (2007)	Good Guys (2012)

Singles from Good Guys
- 1. "I Wanna Be That Feeling" Released: May 7, 2012; 2. "Drinking Side of Country" Released: August 13, 2012

Professional ratings
Review scores
Source	Rating
Allmusic	2.5/5 stars
Country Weekly	4/5 stars
Roughstock	3/5 stars

Good Guys is the second studio album by American country music artist Bucky Covington. It was released on September 11, 2012 by E1 Music. The album includes the singles "I Want My Life Back", "Gotta Be Somebody" (a Nickelback cover), and "A Father's Love (The Only Way He Knew How)", all of which Covington released for the defunct Lyric Street Records between 2009 and 2010. "I Wanna Be That Feeling" was promoted as the album's official lead single by E1 Music, and "Drinking Side of Country" was released as the follow-up.

== Critical reception ==
Giving it 4 out of 5 stars, Tammy Ragusa of Country Weekly said that Covington "sounds so at ease on every track". Stephen Thomas Erlewine of Allmusic rated it 2.5 stars out of 5, criticizing it for having "numerous awkward country-pop attempts". Matt Bjorke of Roughstock gave it 3 out of 5, saying that "He's an emotive, effervescent vocalist with a winning personality and that personality and emotion is shown in abundance throughout the album."

== Track listing ==
No.	Title	Writer(s)	Length
1.	"I Wanna Be That Feeling"	Ben Hayslip, Jimmy Yeary	3:08
2.	"I'm Alright"	Casey Beathard, Tom Douglas	3:48
3.	"Hold a Woman"	Gordon Bradberry, Blake Mevis, Tony Ramey	3:24
4.	"Drinking Side of Country"	Bucky Covington, Rocky Covington, Ducky Medlock	3:16
5.	"Only Got So Much Time"	Bob DiPiero, David Lee Murphy	3:44
6.	"Mama Must Be Prayin'"	Liz Hengber, Michael Logen, J. Matt Nolen	2:35
7.	"Sail On"	Lionel Richie	3:35
8.	"I Always Said You'd Be Back"	Dave Berg, John Scott Sherrill, Deanna Bryant	3:25
9.	"Mexicoma"	Lonnie Fowler, Logan Mize	3:41
10.	"I Want My Life Back"	Frank J. Myers, Anthony L. Smith	4:02
11.	"Gotta Be Somebody"	Chad Kroeger, Ryan Peake, Mike Kroeger, Daniel Adair	3:52
12.	"A Father's Love (The Only Way He Knew How)"	Hengber, Thom Shepherd, Steve Williams	3:20

== Personnel ==
- Bucky Covington – lead vocals
- Dan Dugmore – steel guitar, lap steel guitar
- Shayne Hill – electric guitar
- Gregg "Hobie" Hubbard – background vocals
- Bobby Huff – drums, percussion, background vocals
- Shooter Jennings – duet vocals on "Drinking Side of Country"
- Mac McAnally – acoustic guitar, piano
- Blair Masters – keyboards
- Dale Oliver – dobro, acoustic guitar, electric guitar, programming, slide guitar
- Jason Roller – fiddle, acoustic guitar, mandolin
- Jim Scholten – bass guitar

== Chart performance ==
=== Album ===
Chart (2012)	Peak position
US Billboard 200	177
US Billboard Top Country Albums	30
US Billboard Independent Albums	43

=== Singles ===
Year	Single	Peak positions
Year	Single	US Country
2012	"I Wanna Be That Feeling"	57
2012	"Drinking Side of Country" (with Shooter Jennings)	—
"—" denotes releases that did not chart
