= Hurry Home =

Single by Jason Michael Carroll

from the album Growing Up Is Getting Old
- Released: June 29, 2009
- Genre: Country
- Length: 4:02
- Label: Arista Nashville
- Songwriter: Zane Williams
- Producer: Don Gehman

Jason Michael Carroll singles chronology
"Where I'm From" (2008)	"Hurry Home" (2009)	"Numbers" (2011)

"Hurry Home" is a song written by Zane Williams, and first recorded by him on a 2005 album of the same name. American country music singer Jason Michael Carroll later recorded it on his 2009 album Growing Up Is Getting Old, releasing it as that album's second single in June 2009. The song is his fifth Top 40 hit on the U.S. Billboard Hot Country Songs chart.

== Content ==
"Hurry Home" is a mid-tempo country ballad mostly accompanied by acoustic guitar, with piano and electric guitar flourishes. Its lyrics describe a father trying to contact his runaway daughter and ask her to come home.

In the first verse of the song, a man is about to go to work after waiting by the phone for a call from his daughter. Before leaving, he takes his guitar and records himself playing and singing a greeting on his answering machine (the song's chorus) to tell her that no matter what, he loves her, and she can still come back. At the end of the recording, he sings, "I can't hug you on the phone, so hurry home." In the second verse, the man gets a message from an old friend, who has just found out about the missing daughter. The friend says that if he sees her, he will "remind her that her daddy's worried". In the song's bridge, many days have flown by since the father has heard from his daughter, and people are starting to doubt that she will ever come back. When they tell the father that he should remove the recording, he says he will leave it on the machine, just in case. In the third verse, the song shifts to the daughter, who has been abandoned by "her so-called friends" outside a bar in New York City. She is scared her father will reject her as well, but having nowhere else to turn, finally calls and gets the recording asking her to "hurry home." The last chorus is followed by, "He walked in just in time to hear her say, 'Dad, I'm on my way.'"

Zane Williams, who wrote the song, first recorded it in 2005. His rendition won him a $20,000 prize at the John Lennon Songwriting Contest.

== Music video ==
A video was made for the song was directed by Chris Hicky.

== Critical reception ==
Matt Bjorke of Roughstock gave a positive review, saying that he considered it well-suited to Carroll's voice, also saying, " Anyone who is alive has felt that kind of limitless love be it as a child or a parent and that's what makes this song a winner as it tells a gentile tale of the best kind of love. Country songs are best when they deal with human emotion and that's what 'Hurry Home' does here."

== Chart performance ==
"Hurry Home" debuted at number 56 on the U.S. Billboard Hot Country Songs chart dated July 11, 2009, and reached a peak of number 14 on the chart in February 2010. It also peaked at number 99 on the Billboard Hot 100.

Chart (2009–2010)	Peak position
US Hot Country Songs (Billboard)	14
US Billboard Hot 100	99
