= Reconsider Me: The Love Songs =

Compilation album by Warren Zevon
- Released: January 31, 2006
- Recorded: 1978–2003
- Genre: Rock
- Length: 45:46
- Label: Artemis
- Producer: Warren Zevon, Jackson Browne, Jorge Calderón, Niko Bolas, Waddy Wachtel

Warren Zevon chronology
The Wind (2003)	Reconsider Me: The Love Songs (2006)	Preludes: Rare and Unreleased Recordings (2007)

Professional ratings
Review scores
Source	Rating
Allmusic	3.5/5 stars
Encyclopedia of Popular Music	3/5 stars

Reconsider Me: The Love Songs is a posthumous compilation album by American singer/songwriter Warren Zevon, released in 2006. It is the first album to be released after his death in 2003. A version with an alternative track listing and title as Romantic Genius: The Love Songs was released in Europe three days prior to Reconsider Me's release in the US.

== Track listing ==
All songs by Warren Zevon unless otherwise noted.

1. "Accidentally Like a Martyr" – 3:38
2. "Please Stay" – 3:32
3. "Reconsider Me" – 3:26
4. "Searching for a Heart" – 4:16
5. "Hostage-O" – 4:05
6. "She's Too Good for Me" – 3:10
7. "Tenderness on the Block" (Jackson Browne, Zevon) – 3:54
8. "For My Next Trick I'll Need a Volunteer" – 3:12
9. "I'll Slow You Down" – 3:10
10. "El Amor de Mi Vida" (Jorge Calderón, Zevon) – 3:33
11. "Keep Me in Your Heart" (Calderón, Zevon) – 3:27
12. "Back in the High Life Again" (Will Jennings, Steve Winwood) – 3:11
13. "Don't Let Us Get Sick" – 3:12
  - Previously unreleased live, solo acoustic version recorded at KGSR Studios in Austin, TX, US on December 3, 1999

== Personnel ==
- Warren Zevon – vocals, piano, keyboards
- Waddy Wachtel – guitar
- Benmont Tench – organ
- Jai Winding – keyboards
- Kenny Edwards – bass
- Leland Sklar – bass
- Russ Kunkel – drums
- Don Henley – background vocals
- Karla Bonoff – background vocals
- Timothy B. Schmit – background vocals
