= I'll Walk =

Single by Bucky Covington

from the album Bucky Covington
- Released: April 28, 2008
- Genre: Country
- Length: 3:30 (album version); 3:20 (single version)
- Label: Lyric Street
- Songwriters: Brent Wilson, Lonnie Fowler
- Producer: Mark Miller

Bucky Covington singles chronology
"It's Good to Be Us" (2007)	"I'll Walk" (2008)	"I Want My Life Back" (2009)

"I'll Walk" is a song written by Brent Wilson and Lonnie Fowler, and recorded by American country music artist Bucky Covington. It was released in April 2008 as the third single from his self-titled debut album, and the third consecutive Top 20 country chart entry of his career.

== Content ==
The song is a mid-tempo ballad built around the phrase "I'll walk," which is used in three different contexts within the story. In the first verse, the male narrator has an argument with his girlfriend while driving home from a high school prom, causing her to exit the car and tell him "I'll walk" (i.e., that she will walk home instead of having him drive home). In the second verse, she is struck by a vehicle as its driver could not see her while coming around a curve due to her black dress. The boyfriend then rushes to the hospital to see her after having been told about the accident and that her legs have been crippled. Standing at the hospital bed, the male is then told again by his girl that she will walk, even after being informed about a possible paralysis of her legs. The male explains in the bridge that he stood by her side throughout the entire process of her therapy. Finally, by the third verse, the man and woman have reconciled and are about to marry. The woman, in a wheelchair, looks up to her father at the wedding, telling him that she will walk with him (the father), instead of him wheeling her down the aisle.

== Critical reception ==
The song has received mixed reviews. The song was labeled "thumbs down" and "a solid offering" on two different reviews from the same country music site Engine 145. Reviewer Brady Vercher describes the song as a "tired formula with a happy ending," saying "it's been done before with better writing and a better delivery" which is in contradiction to Vercher's "solid offering" comment made regarding the same song a year earlier.

== Chart performance ==
"I'll Walk" peaked at number 10 on the Billboard Hot Country Songs chart, giving Covington his third consecutive top twenty, and second Top Ten hit from his debut album.

Chart (2008)	Peak Position
US Hot Country Songs (Billboard)	10
US Billboard Hot 100	70

=== Year-end charts ===
Chart (2008)	Position
US Country Songs (Billboard)	51
