= Gotta Be Somebody =

2008 single by Nickelback

Single by Nickelback

from the album Dark Horse
- Released: September 29, 2008
- Recorded: March–July 2008
- Studio: Mountain View (Abbotsford, British Columbia)
- Genre: Post-grunge; alternative rock; pop rock
- Length: 4:13 (album version); 4:01 (radio edit)
- Label: Roadrunner
- Songwriters: Chad Kroeger; Ryan Peake; Mike Kroeger; Daniel Adair
- Producers: Nickelback; Mutt Lange; Joey Moi

Nickelback singles chronology
"Side of a Bullet" (2007)	"Gotta Be Somebody" (2008)	"Something in Your Mouth" (2008)

Music video
- "Gotta Be Somebody" on YouTube

"Gotta Be Somebody" is the first official single released from Canadian rock band Nickelback's sixth studio album, Dark Horse. It reached number 10 on the Billboard Hot 100, becoming their sixth and most recent top-10 hit in the United States.

== Background ==
Originally, the lead single from the album was set to be "If Today Was Your Last Day" but was changed instead to "Gotta Be Somebody". The song was digitally delivered to all formats on September 29, 2008. "Gotta Be Somebody" has been covered by American country music singer Bucky Covington in 2009, and English pop singer Shayne Ward in 2010. It was used in a video package for the 2008 Tribute to the Troops show.

== Music video ==
In October 2008, it was reported that an official video from the commercial shoot had been shot with director Jessy Terrero. However, after claims that the band was dissatisfied with the video, it was scrapped. A new video was shot in Vancouver with long-time collaborator Nigel Dick, three months after the release of the single. The video debuted at AOL on Monday, December 15, 2008.

The video for "Gotta Be Somebody" starts out in Outer Space, showing various planets before zooming in on Earth. Nickelback is shown playing at the Colosseum in Rome, which is empty. During the chorus, an earthquake occurs and cracks the ground the band is standing on. During the second verse, the band is then shown playing on the Brooklyn Bridge in New York City. Another earthquake begins during the chorus and finally, the band is shown playing an outdoor concert to fans in a Southwestern United States desert inside an Aircraft boneyard for the third verse, bridge, and final chorus. One last earthquake is shown during the final chorus as well. After the band finishes the song, the video zooms out of the boneyard concert and back into outer space, focusing on Earth before fading out.

The video swept the 2009 MuchMusic Video Awards, winning awards for best video, best rock video, and best post-production.

== Track listings ==
International CD Single

1. "Gotta Be Somebody"
2. "Saturday Night's Alright for Fighting"

Japanese Promo "Best of" EP

1. "Gotta Be Somebody" (edit)
2. "Photograph"
3. "Far Away"
4. "If Everyone Cared"
5. "Rockstar"
6. "Someday"
7. "Feelin' Way Too Damn Good"
8. "How You Remind Me"
9. "Too Bad"
10. "Breathe"
11. "Leader Of Men"
12. "Gotta Be Somebody" (album version)

== Charts ==
=== Weekly charts ===
Chart (2008–2009)	Peak position
Australia (ARIA)	14
Austria (Ö3 Austria Top 40)	10
Belgium (Ultratop 50 Wallonia)	46
Canada Hot 100 (Billboard)	4
Canada CHR/Top 40 (Billboard)	5
Canada Hot AC (Billboard)	1
Canada Rock (Billboard)	8
Czech Republic Airplay (ČNS IFPI)	42
Germany (GfK)	6
Germany Airplay (BVMI)	2
Hungary (Rádiós Top 40)	27
Japan Hot 100 (Billboard)	36
Netherlands (Dutch Top 40)	18
Netherlands (Single Top 100)	14
New Zealand (Recorded Music NZ)	24
Scottish Singles Sales (Official Charts)	18
Slovakia Airplay (ČNS IFPI)	14
Sweden (Sverigetopplistan)	6
Switzerland (Schweizer Hitparade)	19
UK Singles (Official Charts)	20
UK Rock & Metal (Official Charts)	1
US Billboard Hot 100	10
US Adult Contemporary (Billboard)	18
US Adult Pop Airplay (Billboard)	1
US Alternative Airplay (Billboard)	10
US Mainstream Rock Airplay (Billboard)	9
US Pop Airplay (Billboard)	13

=== Year-end charts ===
Chart (2008)	Position
Australia (ARIA)	95
Canada (Canadian Hot 100)	82

Chart (2009)	Position
Canada (Canadian Hot 100)	27
Hungary (Rádiós Top 40)	162
Sweden (Sverigetopplistan)	98
US Billboard Hot 100	51
US Adult Pop Songs (Billboard)	5

=== All-time charts ===
Chart	Position
US Adult Pop Songs (Billboard)	49

== Certifications ==
Region	Certification	Certified units/sales
Australia (ARIA)	Platinum	70,000^{^}
Canada (Music Canada)	4× Platinum	320,000^{‡}
New Zealand (RMNZ)	Gold	7,500^{*}
United Kingdom (BPI)	Silver	200,000^{‡}
United States (RIAA)	3× Platinum	3,000,000^{‡}
^{*} Sales figures based on certification alone.^{^} Shipments figures based on certification alone.^{‡} Sales+streaming figures based on certification alone.

== Bucky Covington version ==
"Gotta Be Somebody"

Single by Bucky Covington

from the album Good Guys
- Released: October 19, 2009
- Length: 3:48
- Label: Lyric Street
- Songwriters: Chad Kroeger; Ryan Peake; Mike Kroeger; Daniel Adair
- Producer: Mark Miller

Bucky Covington singles chronology
"I Want My Life Back" (2009)	"Gotta Be Somebody" (2009)	"A Father's Love (The Only Way He Knew How)" (2010)

Country artist Bucky Covington released a version of the song as his fifth single on October 19, 2009. The song is the second single released from his second studio album, Good Guys. The song debuted at number 58 on the U.S. Billboard Hot Country Songs chart for the week of November 14, 2009 and ultimately peaked at number 51 a few weeks later. The music video, which was directed by Devin Pense, premiered on CMT on October 26, 2009.

=== Charts ===
Chart (2009)	Peak position
US Hot Country Songs (Billboard)	51

== Shayne Ward version ==
"Gotta Be Somebody"

Single by Shayne Ward

from the album Obsession
- B-side: "Future Love"
- Released: November 7, 2010
- Recorded: 2009–2010
- Length: 3:42
- Label: Sony
- Songwriters: Chad Kroeger; Ryan Peake; Mike Kroeger; Daniel Adair
- Producers: Ray Hedges; Nigel Butler; Cutfather; David Kopatz

Shayne Ward singles chronology
"Breathless" (2007)	"Gotta Be Somebody" (2010)	"Obsession" (2011)

The song was covered by British pop singer Shayne Ward for his third studio album, Obsession. It was the album's lead single, released on November 7, 2010. Ward performed the single for the first time on The X Factor results show on November 7, 2010.

=== Background ===
"Gotta Be Somebody" was produced by Ray Hedges, Nigel Butler, Cutfather and David Kopatz. In an interview with Digital Spy Shayne Ward spoke about the decision to release a cover song as the album's lead single: "The whole transition from being rock to pop/R&B was really exciting for me and it's definitely made it into my own track. It's the perfect first single to kick-start my Obsession album. I don't look it as a cover. It's just a great song. I hadn't heard the song for a while before I recorded it, but I got into it again straight away because it's got such a catchy chorus." According to Ward, the song is about hope, "It's got a great message too – it's about hope, that there's someone out there for all of us. The music video for the single was shot in Los Angeles on 27 September 2010, and was directed by Bille Woodruff. The video for "Gotta Be Somebody" premiered on YouTube on October 29, 2010. The single's B-side, "Future Love", written by Ryan Tedder and Evan Bogart, is a cover of Kristinia DeBarge's version of the Varsity Fanclub original.

=== Track listing ===
CD single

1. "Gotta Be Somebody" – 3:42
2. "Future Love" – 3:08

Digital download

1. "Gotta Be Somebody" – 3:42
2. "Gotta Be Somebody" (Moto Blanco remix) – 5:38
3. "Gotta Be Somebody" (Almighty mix) – 7:02

=== Chart performance ===
"Gotta Be Somebody" debuted first on November 12, 2010 on the Irish Singles Chart at number 10, giving Ward his sixth top 10 hit in the country. On November 14, 2010, the single debuted on the UK Singles Chart at number 12; having been predicted to chart within the top 10 earlier that week. This marks Ward's seventh top 20 hit and second single that failed to crack the top 10.

Chart (2010)	Peak position
Ireland (IRMA)	10
Slovakia Airplay (ČNS IFPI)	64
UK Singles (Official Charts)	12

=== Release history ===
Country	Date	Format
United Kingdom	November 7, 2010	Digital download
United Kingdom	November 8, 2010	CD single
