= I Want My Life Back =

Single by Bucky Covington

from the album Good Guys
- Released: April 20, 2009
- Recorded: 2009
- Genre: Country
- Length: 4:02 (album version); 3:45 (single version)
- Label: Lyric Street
- Songwriters: Frank J. Myers, Anthony L. Smith
- Producer: Mark Miller

Bucky Covington singles chronology
"I'll Walk" (2008)	"I Want My Life Back" (2009)	"Gotta Be Somebody" (2009)

"I Want My Life Back" is a song written by Frank Myers and Anthony L. Smith, and recorded by American country music artist Bucky Covington. It was released in April 2009 as the fourth single of his career, and the lead-off single from his album I'm Alright, which went unreleased when his label folded. The single was later included as part of Good Guys, Covington's formal second studio album in 2012.

== Content ==
"I Want My Life Back" is a ballad, backed primarily with percussion, strings, and steel guitar. The narrator describes a homeless man he meets, who doesn't want food or money, but instead longs for the pleasures of life that were taken away from him (such as his job and his home).

== Critical reception ==
The song has received mixed reviews from critics. Matt Bjorke of Roughstock commented that the song was the best single Bucky Covington has released. "The melody suits the mood of the lyrics and Miller and Oliver’s production never gets in the way of the lyric and while the song is a thoroughly modern affair, it retains enough traditionally Country elements to not ever confuse the song as anything but a Country song." Country Universe was not as positive, and gave the song an F rating. "The homeless man in this song exists solely to help the song make its point - he’s so committed to it, in fact, that he turns down food money in order to recite the words to the bombastic chorus. After that, the homeless man’s words serve to inspire the narrator to realize, as all regretful men in pop-country singles do, that his pride and temper are what killed his previous relationship, and that he now wants his girl back."

== Chart performance ==
"I Want My Life Back" debuted at number 58 on the U.S. Billboard Hot Country Songs chart for the week of April 18, 2009. The song entered the Top 40 of the country charts for the chart week of May 29, 2009 and reached a peak of number 32 in June 2009.

Chart (2009)	Peak Position
US Hot Country Songs (Billboard)	32
