= It's Good to Be Us =

Single by Bucky Covington

from the album Bucky Covington
- Released: September 10, 2007
- Recorded: 2007
- Genre: Country
- Length: 3:04
- Label: Lyric Street
- Songwriters: Dave Berg, Tim James
- Producer: Mark Miller

Bucky Covington singles chronology
"A Different World" (2007)	"It's Good to Be Us" (2007)	"I'll Walk" (2008)

Music video
- "It's Good to Be Us" on YouTube

"It's Good to Be Us" is a song written by Tim James and Dave Berg, and recorded by American country music artist Bucky Covington. It was released in September 2007 as the second single from his self-titled debut album. The song was produced by Sawyer Brown frontman Mark Miller.

== Content ==
"It's Good to Be Us" is an up-tempo country song about a couple, who despite not having much in terms of wealth, are happy just to be alive and that they have each other ("couldn't ask for more, wouldn't settle for less").

== Music video ==
A music video was released in October 23, 2007. The video for "It's Good to Be Us" was shot at Balance MotoX in Bowling Green, Kentucky, and was directed by Trey Fanjoy. It features Covington as one of several motocross drivers. The drivers are shown doing various high risk tricks throughout the video. A celebration ensues at the end of the video with the drivers, (Bucky among them), and their girlfriends having a good time. Scenes of Covington playing a concert at the track at night time are also intercut into the video.

== Chart performance ==
Chart (2007–2008)	Peak position
US Hot Country Songs (Billboard)	11
US Billboard Hot 100	81

=== Year-end charts ===
Chart (2008)	Position
US Country Songs (Billboard)	48
