= What Color Is Your Sky =

What Color Is Your Sky????

Studio album by Jason Michael Carroll
- Released: May 4, 2015
- Recorded: 2014–15
- Genre: Country
- Label: For the Lonely Records
- Producer: Jason Michael Carroll

Jason Michael Carroll chronology
Numbers (2011)	What Color Is Your Sky???? (2015)

Singles from Jason Michael Carroll
- 1. "God Only Knows" Released: March 17, 2015

What Color Is Your Sky is the fourth studio album by American country music artist Jason Michael Carroll. It was released on May 4, 2015 by For the Lonely Records.

== Background ==
Carroll started a Kickstarter campaign to help pay the cost of the album's recording in early 2014, the goal was to raise $40,000 but with help of fans Carroll raised over $70,000 by fans to album pay the album's production costs.

He released the lead single on March 17, 2015, titled "God Only Knows", he also announced his new album would be titled What Color Is Your Sky and would be released May 4, 2015.

== Track listing ==
No.	Title	Writer(s)	Length
1.	"All I'm Drinking 'Bout"	Jason Michael Carroll, A. J. Babcock	4:16
2.	"God Only Knows"	Carroll, A. J. Babcock	3:52
3.	"What Color Is Your Sky"	Carroll, A. J. Babcock	3:32
4.	"Here's To"	Carroll	3:42
5.	"Love Like July"	Carroll, A. J. Babcock	3:28
6.	"Does He Know"	Carroll, A. J. Babcock	3:40
7.	"Til the Speakers Blow"	Carroll	3:44
8.	"Civil War"	Carroll, Shaun Smith	3:25
9.	"Urgency"	Carroll	3:24
10.	"Blown Away"	Carroll	3:43
11.	"We Ride"	Carroll, A. J. Babcock	3:40
12.	"Close Enough"	Carroll, A. J. Babcock	3:10
13.	"Here with Me"	Carroll	3:38
14.	"Painting Pictures"	Carroll	3:49
15.	"Waste Their Life (Demo Version)"	Carroll	3:52

== Personnel ==
- Bob Beech - harmonica
- Jason Michael Carroll - acoustic guitar, drum loops, lead vocals, background vocals
- Andrew Dickson - drums
- Damian Martin - acoustic guitar, electric guitar
- Blake Padilla - keyboards, synthesizer, background vocals
- Cole Phillips - acoustic guitar, electric guitar
- Richie Scholl - acoustic guitar, electric guitar
- Shaun Smith - bass guitar, background vocals
- J.T. Spangler - background vocals
- Chris Young - acoustic guitar, electric guitar

== Charts ==
The album debuted on Top Country Albums chart at No. 37, selling 1,100 copies in the US for the week.

Chart (2015)	Peak position
US Top Country Albums (Billboard)	37
