= Livin' Our Love Song =

Single by Jason Michael Carroll

from the album Waitin' in the Country
- Released: April 9, 2007
- Genre: Country
- Length: 3:52
- Label: Arista Nashville
- Songwriters: Glen Mitchell, Jason Michael Carroll, Tim Galloway
- Producer: Don Gehman

Jason Michael Carroll singles chronology
"Alyssa Lies" (2006)	"Livin' Our Love Song" (2007)	"I Can Sleep When I'm Dead" (2008)

"Livin' Our Love Song" is a song co-written and recorded by American country music artist Jason Michael Carroll and was released in April 2007 as the second single from his album Waitin' in the Country. Carroll co-wrote the song with Glen Mitchell and Tim Galloway.

== Critical reception ==
Deborah Evans Price gave a positive review in Billboard, calling it "lighthearted" and "engaging". She wrote that it has a "sweet, sticky melody and upbeat romantic lyric".

== Music video ==
The music video was directed by David McClister and premiered in April 5, 2007.

== Chart performance ==
Chart (2007)	Peak position
US Hot Country Songs (Billboard)	6
US Billboard Hot 100	52

=== Year-end charts ===
Chart (2007)	Position
US Country Songs (Billboard)	27
