= Growing Up Is Getting Old (album) =

Studio album by Jason Michael Carroll
- Released: April 28, 2009
- Genre: Country
- Length: 38:00
- Label: Arista Nashville
- Producer: Don Gehman

Jason Michael Carroll chronology
Waitin' in the Country (2007)	Growing Up Is Getting Old (2009)	Numbers (2011)

Singles from Growing Up Is Getting Old
- 1. "Where I'm From" Released: November 10, 2008; 2. "Hurry Home" Released: June 29, 2009

Professional ratings
Review scores
Source	Rating
AllMusic	2.5/5 stars

Growing Up Is Getting Old is the second studio album by American country music artist Jason Michael Carroll. It was released on April 28, 2009 by Arista Nashville. Its lead-off single, "Where I'm From" charted in the Top 40 on the Hot Country Songs chart. The second single from the album was "Hurry Home." As with his first album, Carroll worked with producer Don Gehman.

== Content ==
The first single from Growing Up Is Getting Old is "Where I'm From". This song made its chart debut in late 2008 and has entered Top 20 on the Billboard country singles charts. It is also the first single of his career that Carroll did not co-write, and only three of its songs were co-written by him. "Hurry Home" was released in June as the second single. The album was produced by Don Gehman, who also produced Carroll's debut, Waitin' in the Country.

Carroll and Arista Nashville parted ways in February 2010, the same month in which "Hurry Home" peaked.

== Critical reception ==
AllMusic critic Stephen Thomas Erlewine gave the album a two-and-a-half star rating out of five. He said that Carroll's voice was "warm and friendly," but considered the lyrics to be "coldly calculated clichés," citing the presence of topics such as trucks, whiskey, bars and "dewy-eyed salutes to 'Where I'm From'." Robert Loy of Country Standard Time also gave a mostly unfavorably review, saying that the album showed a lack of artistic growth when compared to his debut, saying that except for "Sorry Don't Matter", the songs were derivative in nature. Matt Bjorke of Roughstock gave a more favorable review, saying that although the compilation "may not have a huge 'obvious' hit", he considered all of its tracks to be solid and well-sung.

== Track listing ==
No.	Title	Writer(s)	Length
1.	"Happened on a Saturday Night (Susie Q)"	Jason Michael Carroll, Brian Davis, Vicky McGehee	3:23
2.	"Let Me Go"	Casey Beathard, Tom Shapiro	4:00
3.	"Where I'm From"	Patrick Davis, Joe Leathers	4:36
4.	"Tears"	Arlis Albritton, Ron Davis	4:31
5.	"Growing Up Is Getting Old"	Jeremy Campbell, Josh Thompson	3:09
6.	"That's All I Know"	Beathard, Carroll, Paul Overstreet	3:42
7.	"We Threw It All Away"	Carroll, P. Davis	3:51
8.	"Sorry Don't Matter"	Lee Brice, Kyle Jacobs, B. Davis	3:29
9.	"Barn Burner"	Albritton, B. Davis, Keith Anderson	3:17
10.	"Hurry Home"	Zane Williams	4:02

== Personnel ==
- Kenny Aronoff - drums, percussion
- Tom Bukovac - electric guitar, piano
- Jason Michael Carroll - lead vocals
- J.T. Corenflos - electric guitar
- Wes Hightower - background vocals
- John Hobbs - Hammond organ, piano
- Mike Johnson - dobro, pedal steel guitar
- Chris McHugh - drums, percussion
- Gary Morse - dobro, pedal steel guitar
- Michael Rhodes - bass guitar
- Mike Rojas - Hammond organ, piano
- David Stallings - bird calls
- Ilya Toshinsky - banjo, acoustic guitar
- Biff Watson - banjo, acoustic guitar
- Glenn Worf - bass guitar
- Jonathan Yudkin - banjo, fiddle, mandolin, strings

== Chart performance ==
=== Weekly charts ===
Chart (2009)	Peak position
US Billboard 200	28
US Top Country Albums (Billboard)	7

=== Year-end charts ===
Chart (2009)	Position
US Top Country Albums (Billboard)	73

=== Singles ===
Year	Single	Peak chart positions	
Year	Single	US Country	US
2008	"Where I'm From"	11	64
2009	"Hurry Home"	14	99
