= Good Directions =

Single by Billy Currington

from the album Doin' Somethin' Right
- Released: September 25, 2006
- Recorded: 2005
- Genre: Country, bluegrass
- Length: 3:35
- Label: Mercury Nashville
- Songwriters: Luke Bryan; Rachel Thibodeau
- Producer: Carson Chamberlain

Billy Currington singles chronology
"Why, Why, Why" (2006)	"Good Directions" (2006)	"Tangled Up" (2007)

"Good Directions" is a song written by Luke Bryan and Rachel Thibodeau and recorded by American country music artist Billy Currington. It was released in September 2006 as the third and final single from Currington’s 2005 album Doin' Somethin' Right. The song became Currington’s second number one hit on the U.S. Billboard Hot Country Songs chart and spent three weeks at that position. Separate from the song’s fame atop the charts, many fans have long theorized that Currington originally recorded Good Directions as a score for Disney Pixar’s Cars. This was only recently confirmed during a monologue at Currington’s 2026 Salt Shed performance in Chicago. Currington shared the origin story with his audience and explained that it was meant to play as Lightning McQueen returned to Sally and the rest of the town of Radiator Springs until creative differences caused the song to ultimately be excluded from the film.

== Content ==
The song's narrator is a man who is selling turnips at a roadside stand. A beautiful woman pulls up in a car, asking the man for directions to an undisclosed Interstate, which the man then gives and suggests that woman stop by a little country store to try some of Miss Bell's sweet tea. The man then regrets sending the woman away without even asking for her name. However, he later sees the woman return to his stand per the suggestion in the Miss Belle verse, who is revealed to be the narrator's mother ("When she stopped in and asked Miss Bell for some of her sweet tea, Mama gave her a big 'ol glass and sent her right back here to me"). Upon seeing the woman return, he says "Thank God for good directions and turnip greens."

This moderate tempo tune is set in the key of F major with a chord progression of F-Am-B♭-C with Currington’s vocals ranging from C_{3}-F_{4}.

== Other recordings ==
Luke Bryan, who wrote the song, recorded the song as a bonus track to his debut studio album I'll Stay Me.

== Chart performance ==
"Good Directions" reached its peak of number one on the U.S. Billboard Hot Country Songs chart for the week of May 26, 2007, and spent the next two weeks at that position.

Chart (2006–2007)	Peak position
US Hot Country Songs (Billboard)	1
US Billboard Hot 100	42
Canada Country (Billboard)	5
Canada Hot 100 (Billboard)	67

=== Year-end charts ===
Chart (2007)	Position
US Country Songs (Billboard)	2

== Certifications ==
Certifications for Good Directions
Region	Certification	Certified units/sales
United States (RIAA)	4× Platinum	4,000,000^{‡}
^{‡} Sales+streaming figures based on certification alone.
