= Alyssa Lies =

Single by Jason Michael Carroll

from the album Waitin' in the Country
- Released: October 17, 2006
- Recorded: 2006
- Genre: Country
- Length: 4:19
- Label: Arista Nashville
- Songwriter: Jason Michael Carroll
- Producer: Don Gehman

Jason Michael Carroll singles chronology
"Alyssa Lies" (2006)	"Livin' Our Love Song" (2007)

"Alyssa Lies" is a song written and recorded by American country music artist Jason Michael Carroll. The song was released as a single in October 2006, and served as his debut single and the lead-off to his debut album Waitin' in the Country.

== Background ==
Carroll took two years to write "Alyssa Lies." The song was so emotionally painful to write that he got migraines while writing. It is based on a true story of a girl that wasn't saved from abuse in time. It seemed to Carroll that no matter what he wrote, he would never be satisfied with it. When he realized that he would not be able to make the song perfect, he tried the best he could to make it realistic and sufficiently emotional. After three years, he felt it was as heartfelt as he could make it, and recorded the song.

== Content ==
The song is about a young girl, the narrator's daughter, who met a school friend named Alyssa, who is suffering abuse. To explain her injuries, Alyssa lies to the teachers and classmates, so as not to implicate the culprit. The narrator's daughter had all explained this to him, and then asks why Alyssa lies about her situation ("My little girl asked me why Alyssa lies").

Eventually, the father (the singer) of the little girl, after hearing her pray one night for Alyssa's safety, decides to report the suspected abuse at school. However, when they get to school on Monday, it is too late; the culprit has apparently beaten Alyssa to death. Thus the lyrics, "She doesn't lie in the classroom ..." The singer goes on to bemoan the failings of her teachers and others who could have reported the abuse, and then tells how he had to tearfully explain why Alyssa wasn't at school to his little daughter.

== Response ==
On the radio station 93.7 The Bull, located in St. Louis, Missouri, a trucker called in, and he said he had just listened to the song, and his eyes had become so filled with tears that he almost veered off of the road.

The song has received much attention for its message in the severity and prevalence of child abuse.

== Chart performance ==
Chart (2006–2007)	Peak position
US Hot Country Songs (Billboard)	5
US Billboard Hot 100	58
US Billboard Pop 100	91

=== Year-end charts ===
Chart (2007)	Position
US Country Songs (Billboard)	44
