= Must Be Doin' Somethin' Right =

Single by Billy Currington

from the album Doin' Somethin' Right
- Released: May 16, 2005
- Recorded: 2005
- Genre: Country; blue-eyed soul
- Length: 4:29 (album version); 3:59 (radio version)
- Label: Mercury Nashville
- Songwriters: Marty Dodson; Patrick Jason Matthews
- Producer: Carson Chamberlain

Billy Currington singles chronology
"Party for Two" (2004)	"Must Be Doin' Somethin' Right" (2005)	"Why, Why, Why" (2006)

Music video
- "Must Be Doin' Somethin' Right" on YouTube

"Must Be Doin' Somethin' Right" is a song written by Marty Dodson and Patrick Jason Matthews and recorded by American country music singer Billy Currington. It was released in May 2005 as the first single from Currington's 2005 album Doin' Somethin' Right. The song became Currington's first number one hit on the U.S. Billboard Hot Country Songs chart.

== Content ==
The song is a love ballad, set in the key of A major, with a main chord pattern of F♯m-D-A on the verses. In it, the narrator says that he "must be doin' somethin' right" in the relationship with his lover.

== Critical reception ==
Stephen Thomas Erlewine of Allmusic wrote that the song "gets a nicely mellow, relaxed Californian vibe".

== Chart performance ==
"Must Be Doin' Somethin' Right" debuted at number 60 on the U.S. Billboard Hot Country Singles & Tracks for the week of June 11, 2005, and peaked at No. 1 on December 31, 2005. The song has sold 1,282,000 copies in the US as of January 2016.

Chart (2005–2006)	Peak position
Canada Country (Radio & Records)	4
US Hot Country Songs (Billboard)	1
US Billboard Hot 100	39

=== Year-end charts ===
Chart (2006)	Position
US Country Songs (Billboard)	34

== Release history ==
Release dates and format(s) for "Must Be Doin' Somethin' Right"
Region	Date	Format(s)	Label(s)	Ref.
United States	May 16, 2005	Country radio	Mercury Nashville	

== Certifications ==
Certifications for "Must Be Doin' Somethin' Right"
Region	Certification	Certified units/sales
United States (RIAA)	4× Platinum	4,000,000^{‡}
United States (RIAA) Mastertone	Gold	500,000^{*}
^{*} Sales figures based on certification alone.^{‡} Sales+streaming figures based on certification alone.
