= I Can Sleep When I'm Dead =

Single by Jason Michael Carroll

from the album Waitin' in the Country
- Released: February 4, 2008
- Genre: Country
- Length: 3:21
- Label: Arista Nashville
- Songwriters: Jim Collins; Rivers Rutherford; Jason Michael Carroll
- Producer: Don Gehman

Jason Michael Carroll singles chronology
"Livin' Our Love Song" (2007)	"I Can Sleep When I'm Dead" (2008)	"Where I'm From" (2008)

"I Can Sleep When I'm Dead" is a song co-written and recorded by American country music artist Jason Michael Carroll. It was released in February 2008 as the third single from his album Waitin' in the Country. It peaked at number 21 on the Billboard country charts. The song was written by Carroll, Rivers Rutherford and Jim Collins.

== Content ==
The song is an up-tempo accompanied largely by electric guitar, in which the central character is kept awake due to a lifestyle of constant nighttime partying. As a result, he does not have any time set aside for sleeping, thus claiming that he can "sleep when [he's] dead". The song's title was inspired by a comment which Carroll made to a friend, describing his own attempts to maintain his career in country music while raising four children at the same time.

== Reception ==
Engine 145 reviewer Matt C. gave the song a "thumbs up" rating. He described the song as "a rather surreal experience for me, as I’m used to hearing 'I can sleep when I'm dead' from workaholics who are referring to anything but painting up the town" but added, "It’s hard not to smile at the image of Jason Michael Carroll racing his paperboy home and his baritone voice sounds really great on this track. If we must have country rock, this is what it should be: this song's loud, but in a country kind of way."

== Music video ==
A music video was made for the song in June 2008. It was directed by David McClister, who also directed the video for Carroll's 2007 single "Livin' Our Love Song".

== Chart performance ==
Chart (2008)	Peak position
US Hot Country Songs (Billboard)	21
US Bubbling Under Hot 100 (Billboard)	15
