= Why, Why, Why =

Single by Billy Currington

from the album Doin' Somethin' Right
- Released: February 27, 2006
- Recorded: 2005
- Genre: Country
- Length: 2:45
- Label: Mercury Nashville
- Songwriters: Mark Nesler; Billy Currington; Tony Martin
- Producer: Carson Chamberlain

Billy Currington singles chronology
| "Must Be Doin' Somethin' Right" (2005) | "Why, Why, Why" (2006) | "Good Directions" (2006) |

"Why, Why, Why" is a song co-written and recorded by American country music artist Billy Currington. It was released in February 2006 as the second single from his 2005 album Doin' Somethin' Right. The song peaked at number 13 on the U.S. Billboard Hot Country Songs chart and at number 99 on the Billboard Hot 100. Currington co-wrote this song with Mark Nesler and Tony Martin.

== Chart performance ==
"Why, Why, Why" debuted at number 54 on the U.S. Billboard Hot Country Songs chart for the week of March 11, 2006.

| Chart (2006) | Peak position |
|---|---|
| Canada Country (Radio & Records) | 30 |
| US Hot Country Songs (Billboard) | 13 |
| US Billboard Hot 100 | 99 |

=== Year-end charts ===
| Chart (2006) | Position |
|---|---|
| US Country Songs (Billboard) | 46 |
