= Bucky Covington =

American singer

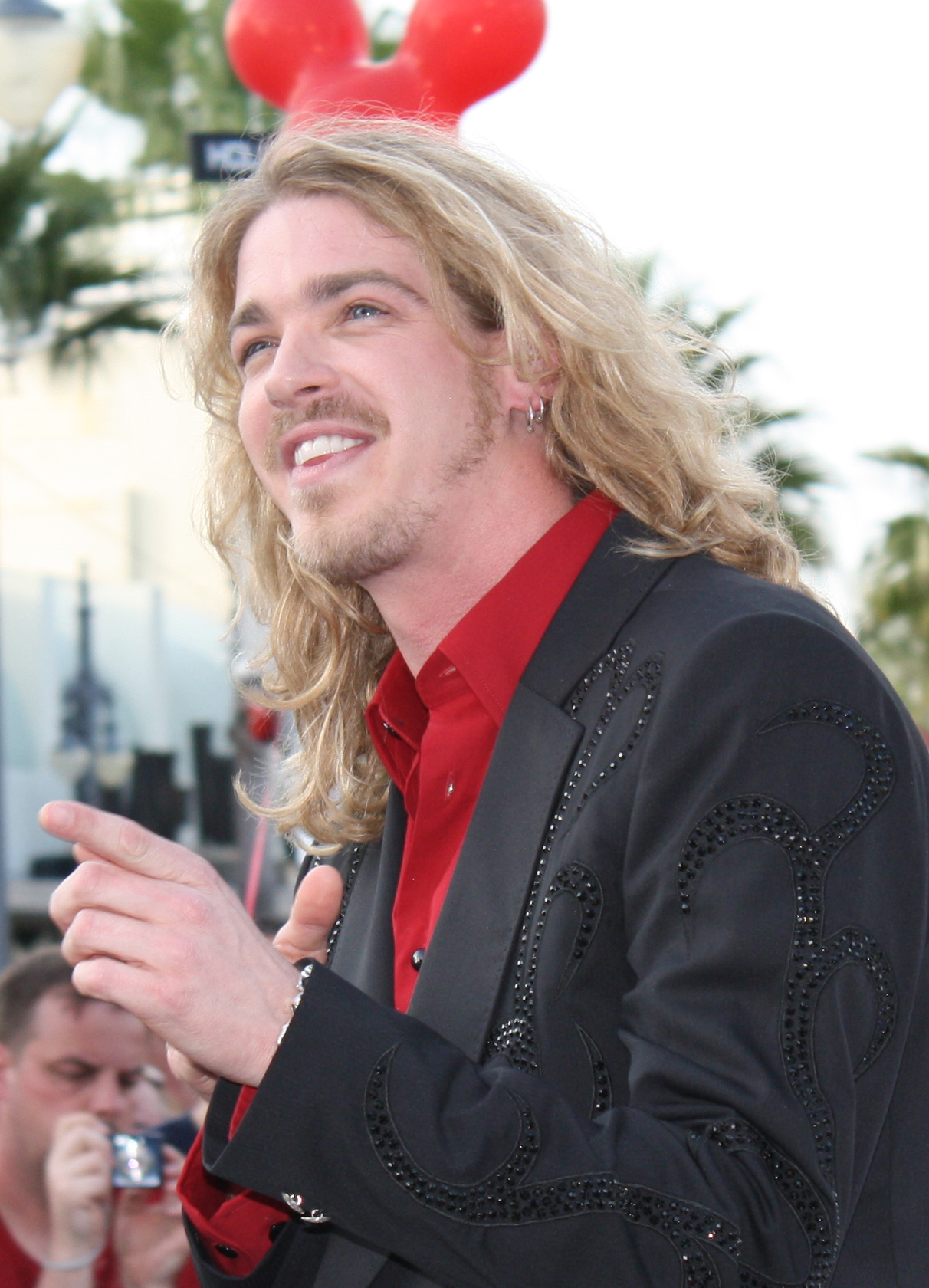
- Bucky Covington in The American Idol Experience motorcade at Walt Disney World.

Background information
- Birth name: William Joel Covington III
- Born: November 8, 1977 (age 47)
- Origin: Rockingham, North Carolina, U.S.
- Genres: Country
- Occupation: Singer
- Instrument(s): Vocals, guitar, bass guitar, drums
- Years active: 2006–present
- Labels: Lyric Street, E1 Music
- Website: buckycovington.com

William Joel "Bucky" Covington III (born November 8, 1977) is an American country music singer. He placed eighth on the 5th season of the Fox Network's talent competition series American Idol. In December 2006, he signed a recording contract with Lyric Street Records. His self-titled debut album, produced by Dale Oliver and Mark Miller of the band Sawyer Brown, was released on April 17, 2007. The album debuted at number one on the Billboard Top Country Albums chart, and produced three hit singles on the Hot Country Songs charts: "A Different World" at number six, "It's Good to Be Us" at number eleven, and "I'll Walk" at number ten. Three more singles: "I Want My Life Back", "Gotta Be Somebody", and "A Father's Love (The Only Way He Knew How)", were released for an unreleased second album, titled I'm Alright, and later included on his 2012 album, Good Guys.

== Biography ==
=== Personal life ===
William Joel “Bucky” Covington was born in Rockingham, North Carolina, to Gene Covington and Deborah Gates on November 8, 1977 - along with his identical twin brother, Robert David "Rocky" Covington. Bucky is the nickname derived from his grandfather "Buck". He graduated in the class of 1996 from Scotland High School in Laurinburg, North Carolina. He worked at Covington's Body Shop in Rockingham, North Carolina.

At the age of 18, Covington taught himself how to play the guitar and began performing at clubs. He is also a bassist, drummer, and songwriter. Over the years, Covington has expanded his talents, both country and rock. After some time, he elected to perform both original and cover material in a cross-genre vein. Rocky is also a musician and is the former lead singer of the North Carolina band Swamp Cat.

In 1998, when the Covington twins were 20 years old, they were in a minor automobile mishap. Bucky allegedly pretended to be Rocky. They were arrested for confusing the authorities. The plaintiff failed to identify which twin was driving, since the twins were identical.

After Idol, Bucky bought a house in Franklin, Tennessee, near Nashville, which he shared with Rocky and his wife Terra. Rocky also joined Bucky's band as a drummer. On February 13, 2007, he and his wife Crystal separated after more than seven years of marriage. Covington became engaged to Katherine Cook in 2011.

On October 10, 2014, Covington's fiancee, Katherine Cook, gave birth to their daughter, Kennedy Taylor Covington.

=== American Idol ===
In the 2005-06 season, the Covington twins auditioned for American Idol in Greensboro, North Carolina, individually. Of the two, Bucky advanced to the final twelve. On March 22, Bucky remained in the bottom three, along with Lisa Tucker and Kevin Covais. On April 12, when Covington was in the bottom three with Ace Young and Elliott Yamin, the votes went to the latter two. In the Top 8 results show of season six of American Idol, he appeared in one of the front rows.

Performances during Idol
Semi-finals

- February 22, 2006: "Simple Man" by Lynyrd Skynyrd
- March 1, 2006: "The Thunder Rolls" by Garth Brooks
- March 8, 2006: "Wave on Wave" by Pat Green

Finals

- March 14, 2006: "Superstition" by Stevie Wonder
- March 21, 2006: "Oh Boy" by Buddy Holly (Bottom 2)
- March 28, 2006: "Real Good Man" by Tim McGraw
- April 4, 2006: "Best I Ever Had" by Gary Allan
- April 11, 2006: "Fat Bottomed Girls" by Queen (Bottom 3, Eliminated)

=== Debut album: Bucky Covington ===
In November and December 2006, Bucky Covington performed on the GAC Country Music Christmas tour, making him the first Idol from the 5th season to be part of a major non-American Idol concert tour.

Covington negotiated with Buena Vista Music Group's country label, Lyric Street Records. His debut single, "A Different World", was released to country radio on January 16, 2007, coinciding with the premiere of American Idol (season 6). Its initial debut on radio was on Sirius Satellite Radio's New Country channel in late December 2006.

His debut album, Bucky Covington, was released on April 17, 2007, to positive reviews. It debuted on the Billboard 200 at number four selling 61,000 copies. It also debuted at number one on the Top Country Albums chart, making the album the best opening week for a debut album by a male on the chart since Billy Ray Cyrus' 1992 debut with Some Gave All. Covington's debut surpassed the previous record held by Jason Michael Carroll's Waitin' in the Country. He performed selections from his album during a nationwide tour in 2007, and the track "Empty Handed" appeared in NASCAR 08 as part of the in-game soundtrack. Overall, Bucky Covington accounted for three singles. "A Different World" peaked at number six, followed by "It's Good to Be Us" at number eleven and "I'll Walk" at number ten.

=== Unreleased second album: I'm Alright and Good Guys ===
In January 2009, Lyric Street noted that Covington has been in the studio recording his second album, I'm Alright. The lead-off single, "I Want My Life Back" was released to radio in April 2009 and it peaked at number 32. In early October 2009, Covington released a cover version of Nickelback's hit single "Gotta Be Somebody" which peaked at number 51 in December 2009 after spending only three weeks on the chart. The album's third single, "A Father's Love (The Only Way He Knew How)", was released in March 2010, and peaked at number 23.

The album was expected for release on April 27, 2010. However, in April 2010, it was announced Lyric Street Records would be closing, but Covington would be transferred to another label owned by Disney Music Group. However, Covington remained unsigned until October 2011 when it was announced that he had signed as the "premier artist" for E1 Music's Entertainment One Nashville label. Covington released his second studio album, Good Guys, on September 11, 2012. Two singles—"I Wanna Be That Feeling" and "Drinking Side of Country"—were released by E1 Music in promotion of the album.

== Discography ==
=== Studio albums ===
Title	Album details	Peak chart positions			Sales
Title	Album details	US Country	US	US Indie	Sales
Bucky Covington	Release date: April 17, 2007; Label: Lyric Street	1	4	—	US: 427,000
Good Guys	Release date: September 11, 2012; Label: E1 Music	30	177	43	US: 3,000
"—" denotes releases that did not chart

=== Extended plays ===
Title	EP details	Peak positions
Title	EP details	US Country
Live from Rockingham	Release date: November 17, 2009; Label: Lyric Street	—
I'm Alright	Release date: April 27, 2010; Label: Lyric Street	73
Reality Country	Release date: May 4, 2010; Label: Lyric Street	—
Happy Man	Release date: July 14, 2015; Label: self-released	—
"—" denotes releases that did not chart

=== Singles ===
Year	Single	Peak chart positions		Album
Year	Single	US Country	US	Album
2007	"A Different World"	6	58	Bucky Covington
2007	"It's Good to Be Us"	11	81	Bucky Covington
2008	"I'll Walk"	10	70	Bucky Covington
2009	"I Want My Life Back"	32	—	Reality Country (EP)
2009	"Gotta Be Somebody"	51	—	Reality Country (EP)
2010	"A Father's Love (The Only Way He Knew How)"	23	—^{[A]}	I'm Alright (EP)
2012	"I Wanna Be That Feeling"	57	—	Good Guys
2012	"Drinking Side of Country" (with Shooter Jennings)	—	—	Good Guys
2014	"Buzzin'"	—	—	Happy Man (EP)
2015	"I Feel Ya"	—	—	Happy Man (EP)
"—" denotes releases that did not chart

Notes

- A "A Father's Love (The Only Way He Knew How)" did not enter the Billboard Hot 100 but peaked on the Bubbling Under Hot 100 Singles chart at number twenty-two.

=== Guest singles ===
Year	Single	Artist	Album
2014	"Redneck Country Song"	Lenny Cooper	The Grind

=== Music videos ===
Year	Video	Director
2007	"A Different World"	Trey Fanjoy
2007	"It's Good to Be Us"	Trey Fanjoy
2009	"Gotta Be Somebody"	Devin Pense
2012	"I Wanna Be That Feeling"	Kristin Barlowe
2012	"Drinking Side of Country" (with Shooter Jennings)	Blake Judd
2015	"Redneck Country Song" (with Lenny Cooper)	

=== Other appearances ===
- "Superstition" from American Idol Season 5: Encores (2006)

== Filmography ==
Film
Year	Film	Role	Notes
2009	Hannah Montana: The Movie	Himself	Played guitar in Robby Stewart's (Billy Ray Cyrus) band
2009	Fisher's ATV World	Himself	
2011	Billy Ray Cyrus: I'm American	Himself	TV movie

== See also ==
- List of twins
- American Idol (season 5)
