= Mark Nesler =

American musician

- Born: January 5, 1961 (age 64); Beaumont, Texas, U.S.
- Origin: Buna, Texas, U.S.
- Genres: Country
- Occupation: Singer-songwriter
- Instrument(s): Vocals, guitar, banjo
- Years active: 1994–present
- Labels: Asylum, Compendia

Mark Eugene Nesler (born January 5, 1961) is an American country music artist. Signed to Elektra Records as a recording artist in 1998, Nesler charted three singles on the U.S. Billboard country charts. In addition, he has written several singles for other country music artists, including Tim McGraw's "Just to See You Smile", a song which Billboard ranked as the number one country single of 1998.

== Biography ==
Nesler played guitar at an early age. Inspired by the bluegrass music his father listened to, he soon learned to play banjo as well. After graduating high school, he played in a band called the Two Dollar Pistols. In 1994, he was signed to a songwriting deal with MCA Publishing, and soon joined Tracy Byrd's touring band. Byrd also recorded and released "Heaven in My Woman's Eyes", which Nesler wrote, as a single in 1996.

In 1998, Nesler scored his first number one as a songwriter, when Tim McGraw spent six weeks at Number One on the Billboard country music charts with "Just to See You Smile". The same year, Nesler's first album was released on Asylum Records. Its leadoff single, "Used to the Pain", peaked at No. 47 on the country charts. The album also produced his highest-charting single in "Slow Down" at No. 46, followed by "Baby Ain't Rockin' Me Right" at No. 62. He also co-wrote Aaron Tippin's late-1998 single "For You I Will".

Although he exited Elektra in 1999, Nesler continued to write for Byrd, who released "Take Me with You When You Go" and "Just Let Me Be in Love" in 2000 and 2002 respectively. George Strait recorded two of his songs: "Go On"; and "Living and Living Well" which was a No. 1 single. In 2005, Tracy Lawrence reached No. 35 on the country charts with a cover of "Used to the Pain". Nesler co-wrote Bucky Covington's 2007 debut single "A Different World", while Nesler's other credits included "Why, Why, Why" and "Let Me Down Easy" (co-written with Jennifer Hanson and Marty Dodson) by Billy Currington and another number one with Keith Urban's 2008 single "You Look Good in My Shirt", along with Josh Turner's "Time Is Love", Billboard’s 2012 most played song of the year.

== Discography ==
=== Albums ===
| Title | Album details | Peak positions |
| Title | Album details | US Country |
|---|---|---|
| I'm Just That Way | Release date: June 23, 1998; Label: Asylum Records | 70 |
| Up All Night | Release date: October 14, 2003; Label: Compendia | — |
"—" denotes releases that did not chart

=== Singles ===
| Year | Single | Peak chart positions | | Album |
| Year | Single | US Country | CAN Country | Album |
|---|---|---|---|---|
| 1998 | "Used to the Pain" | 47 | 43 | I'm Just That Way |
| 1998 | "Slow Down" | 46 | 45 | I'm Just That Way |
| 1999 | "Baby Ain't Rockin' Me Right" | 62 | — | I'm Just That Way |
"—" denotes releases that did not chart

=== Music videos ===
| Year | Video | Director |
|---|---|---|
| 1998 | "Used to the Pain" | Jim Hershleder |
| 1998 | "Slow Down" | Trey Fanjoy |
