= Where I'm From (Jason Michael Carroll song) =

Single by Jason Michael Carroll

from the album Growing Up Is Getting Old
- Released: November 10, 2008
- Recorded: 2008
- Genre: Country
- Length: 4:35
- Label: Arista Nashville
- Songwriters: Patrick Davis; Joe Leathers
- Producer: Don Gehman

Jason Michael Carroll singles chronology
"I Can Sleep When I'm Dead" (2008)	"Where I'm From" (2008)	"Hurry Home" (2009)

"Where I'm From" is a song written by Patrick Davis and Joe Leathers, and recorded by American country music singer Jason Michael Carroll. It was released in November 2008 as the lead-off single from his album Growing Up Is Getting Old, released on April 28, 2009. The song is Carroll's fourth Top 40 hit on the country charts.

== Content ==
"Where I'm From" is a mid-tempo with fiddle and acoustic guitar flourishes. In the first verse, the narrator is on a flight to Los Angeles, with a ticket upgrade. A businessman next to him notices the narrator's clothing, and through conversation, the narrator tells the businessman about the rural lifestyle in the town where he was raised.

In the second verse, the narrator and the businessman continue their conversation. The narrator explains that his older brother is sick with cancer (which is implied to be terminal) and has asked to be brought home to his family and friends. In the third and final verse, the businessman promises to pray for the narrator's brother and reveals that he, too, had a rural upbringing.

== Critical reception ==
Matt Bjorke of Roughstock gave the song a mixed review. He described the song as "all too Disney for him." He also said that the song is "not a bad song; it's just not a great one."

CM Wilcox, of The 9513 gave the song a "thumbs down" review. He stated in his review that "the chorus treads the same ground as Alan Jackson's 'Where I Come From' and any number of other songs, while the verses concoct a storyline that is not only cliché, but also improbable and unfocused to the point of distraction–ultimately sinking any possibility of success."

== Chart performance ==
"Where I'm From" debuted at number 60 on the U.S. Billboard Hot Country Songs chart dated December 6, 2008.

Chart (2008–2009)	Peak position
US Hot Country Songs (Billboard)	11
US Billboard Hot 100	64

=== Year-end charts ===
Chart (2009)	Position
US Country Songs (Billboard)	59
