= Django Walker =

American singer-songwriter

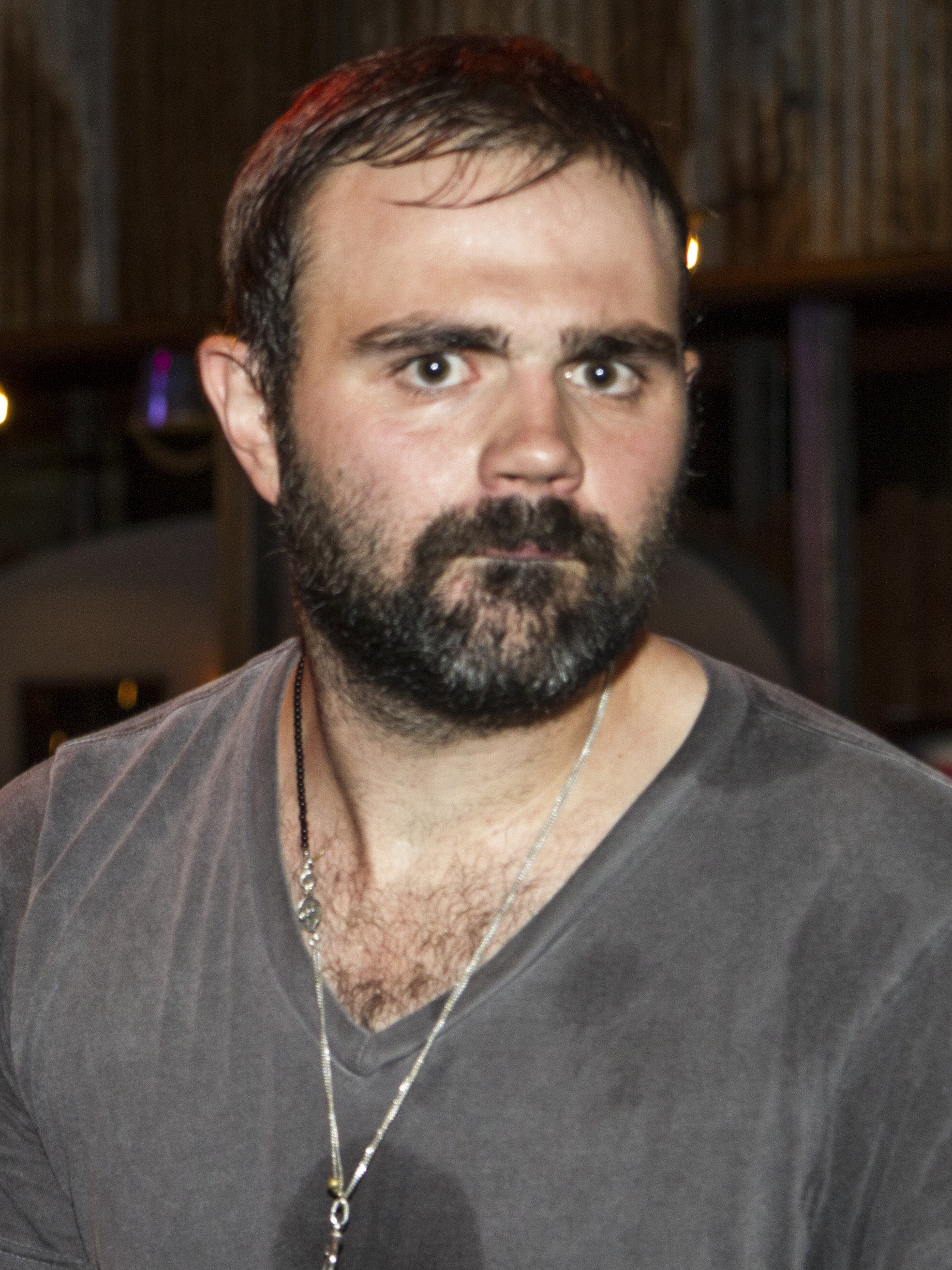
- Walker in 2014

Background information
- Born: Django Cody Walker; August 28, 1981 (age 44)
- Occupation: singer-songwriter
- Years active: 1997–present

Django Walker (born August 28, 1981) is a Texas Country singer-songwriter and the frontman for the Django Walker Band.

== Biography ==
Named after Belgian guitarist Django Reinhardt, Walker is the son of country music artist Jerry Jeff Walker and Susan Walker. He began learning to play guitar at age 15. After graduating from Austin High School in 1999, he attended the Liverpool Institute for Performing Arts from 1999 to 2001, but did not graduate. He has said the experience made him "a better musician", but also says he learned much more traveling out on the road.

== Career ==
When he was 16, Walker wrote his first song, "The Road You Choose", and performed it on stage at his father's shows. His father recorded it on his 1999 CD, Gypsy Songman, and Django later released his own recording of it.

His band's debut CD, Down the Road, produced by Lloyd Maines, was released in 2002. Walker released the CD on a label he formed himself, Lazy Kid Music. He recorded the CD in five days, and wrote all but one of the songs himself. One of those songs, "Texas on my Mind", was previously recorded by Pat Green, and reached number 1 on the Texas Music Chart. Walker had written the song while a student at the Liverpool Institute for Performing Arts. Dad's 1999 album "Gypsy Songman" contains the autobiographical father to son tune "Little Man".

Walker's second CD, Six Trips Around the World, was released in 2006. It was produced by Mark Bryan of Hootie and the Blowfish, and recorded at Bryan's home in South Carolina.

Walker's 2011 song, "Texas Longhorn", is played after the third quarter of Texas Longhorns football home games.

== Musical style ==
Walker has cited several different influences for his musical style, including popular rock artists The Beatles, Bob Dylan, The Allman Brothers, Tom Petty, Neil Young, as well as country artists Merle Haggard, Waylon Jennings, Willie Nelson, Pat Green, Robert Earl Keen, Guy Clark, and Townes Van Zandt. Reviewers have described his style as "unique country", "country/rocker", and "classic rock with undertones of good old Southern comfort".

== Personal ==
Walker attended Austin High School in Austin, Texas, graduating in 1999. He played on the varsity basketball team, and, while studying in England, played semi-professional basketball.
