= I'll Sleep When I'm Dead: The Dirty Life and Times of Warren Zevon =

Biography of Warren Zevon

- Author: Crystal Zevon
- Language: English
- Subject: Biography
- Publisher: Ecco Books
- Publication date: 2007
- Publication place: United States
- Media type: Hardcover, paperback
- ISBN: 978-0-06-076345-9
- OCLC: 76864657
- Dewey Decimal: 782.42166092 B 22
- LC Class: ML420.Z475 Z58 2007

I'll Sleep When I'm Dead: The Dirty Life and Times of Warren Zevon is a biography and oral history of the rock musician Warren Zevon compiled by his ex-wife Crystal Zevon and published May 2007 by Ecco Books.

The book is an unflinching look at Zevon's "high times and hard ways" and contains many admiring reflections on Zevon's work from his famous musical peers, alongside some unsavory revelations. Included are details about Zevon's abusive behavior toward his ex-wife and children in the 1970s, his many sexual dalliances and his return to drinking and drug use after his diagnosis of incurable cancer. Extensive use is made of excerpts from Zevon's private journals, which are concerned largely with his sexual partners, music industry worries and his relationships with his children, Jordan and Ariel.

The book is interspersed with interviews conducted with 87 friends, lovers and collaborators, including Bruce Springsteen, Jackson Browne, Stephen King, Billy Bob Thornton and Bonnie Raitt. It is reputed that before his death Zevon gave the project his blessing and requested that the book be uncompromising in its honesty about even the most unflattering details.
