= Waitin' in the Country =

Studio album by Jason Michael Carroll
- Released: February 6, 2007
- Genre: Country
- Length: 41:38
- Label: Arista Nashville
- Producer: Don Gehman

Jason Michael Carroll chronology
Waitin' in the Country (2007)	Growing Up Is Getting Old (2009)

Singles from Waitin' in the Country
- 1. "Alyssa Lies" Released: October 17, 2006; 2. "Livin' Our Love Song" Released: April 9, 2007; 3. "I Can Sleep When I'm Dead" Released: February 4, 2008

Professional ratings
Review scores
Source	Rating
Allmusic	3/5 stars
Engine 145	4/5 stars

Waitin' in the Country is the debut studio album by American country music artist Jason Michael Carroll. It was released on February 6, 2007, by Arista Nashville. The album produced three singles on the Billboard Hot Country Songs charts in "Alyssa Lies", "Livin' Our Love Song", and "I Can Sleep When I'm Dead", which respectively reached No. 5, No. 6, and No. 21.

The track "Love Won't Let Me" was previously recorded by Victor Sanz, who released it as a single in 2005 from his album Hey Country.

== Track listing ==
No.	Title	Writer(s)	Length
1.	"Waitin' in the Country"	Cole Deggs, Craig Wiseman	3:48
2.	"I Can Sleep When I'm Dead"	Jim Collins, Rivers Rutherford, Jason Michael Carroll	3:23
3.	"Alyssa Lies"	Carroll	4:19
4.	"Lookin' at You"	Rick Ferrell, Wade Kirby	3:08
5.	"No Good in Goodbye" (featuring Jewel)	Jewel, Shaye Smith, Carroll	3:50
6.	"Livin' Our Love Song"	Tim Galloway, Glen Mitchell, Carroll	3:52
7.	"Anywhere U.S.A."	Wiseman, Brad Crisler	3:40
8.	"Honky Tonk Friends"	Casey Beathard, Ed Hill	3:45
9.	"Love Won't Let Me"	Steve Robson, Jeffrey Steele	3:47
10.	"Angel of Broken Hearts"	Austin Cunningham, Liz Rose	4:16
11.	"Let It Rain"	Tommy Lee James, Terry McBride, Carroll	3:45

== Personnel ==
Compiled from liner notes.

Musicians

- Jason Michael Carroll — lead vocals
- Perry Coleman — background vocals
- J. T. Corenflos — electric guitar
- Michael Daly — steel guitar
- Dan Dugmore — steel guitar
- Larry Frankliln — mandolin, fiddle
- Billy Hawn — percussion
- Wes Hightower — background vocals
- John Hobbs — piano, organ, keyboards
- Jewel — duet vocals on "No Good in Goodbye"
- Greg Morrow — drums
- Herb Pedersen — background vocals
- Alison Prestwood — bass guitar
- Michael Rhodes — bass guitar
- Michael Rojas — piano, organ, keyboards
- John Wesley Ryles — background vocals
- Biff Watson — acoustic guitar
- Jonathan Yudkin — violin, banjo, mandolin, strings, string arrangements

Technical

- Mark Dearnley — recording, mixing
- Don Gehman — production, mixing
- John Hobbs — music director
- Bob Ludwig — mastering

== Charts ==
=== Weekly charts ===
Chart (2007)	Peak position
US Billboard 200	8
US Top Country Albums (Billboard)	1

=== Year-end charts ===
Chart (2007)	Position
US Billboard 200	182
US Top Country Albums (Billboard)	38

=== Singles ===
Year	Single	Peak chart positions	
Year	Single	US Country	US
2006	"Alyssa Lies"	5	58
2007	"Livin' Our Love Song"	6	52
2008	"I Can Sleep When I'm Dead"	21	115
