= Marty Dodson =

American singer-songwriter/producer

Marty Dodson (born September 17, 1964 in Apple Valley, California) is an American singer-songwriter/producer. He has had songs recorded by artists such as Carrie Underwood, Kenny Chesney, George Strait, The Oak Ridge Boys, The Plain White T's, Saving Jane, Lonestar, Billy Currington, and Craig Morgan. His first #1 song, “Must Be Doin' Somethin' Right”, spent two weeks at the top of the country charts and was the first #1 for Billy Currington as well. Marty produced two songs on “Saving Jane” in 2009 and continues to write and produce new acts. His song “Bounce”, recorded by Cho Yong Pil, won “Song of the Year” at the Mnet Asian Music Awards in 2013 and the same award at the 2013 MAMA Awards in South Korea.

== Notable recordings ==
- “Everybody Wants to Go to Heaven” – Kenny Chesney

#1 Single
Certified Gold Album

- “Must Be Doin' Somethin' Right" – Billy Currington

#1 Single
Certified Digital Gold Single
Certified Platinum Album

- "While You Loved Me" – Rascal Flatts

Top 10 Single
Certified Double Platinum Album

- "I’ve Gotta Find You” – Lonestar

Certified Triple Platinum Album

- "Songs Like This" – Carrie Underwood —Certified Double Platinum Album
- “I’m In Love With A Vampire” – Saving Jane—Co-Wrote and Co-Produced
- “Immortal” – Saving Jane —Co-Wrote and Co-Produced
- “Let Me Down Easy” – Billy Currington

#1 Single — ACA Nominee Song of The Year 2011

- “Fire It Up” – Johnny Reid

#1 Single Canada—Tour Title

- “Fire It Up” – Joe Cocker

Germany—Certified Gold Album

- “Bounce” – Cho Yong Pil - #1 Single Multiple Weeks South Korea

2013 MelOn Music Awards – Rock Song of the Year
2013 Mnet Asian Music Awards – Asian Song of the Year
2013 KBS Music Bank K-Chart Song of the Year

- “Could It Be” – Charlie Worsham – Highest Charting Debut Single 2013
