= Jason Michael Carroll =

American singer-songwriter (born 1978)

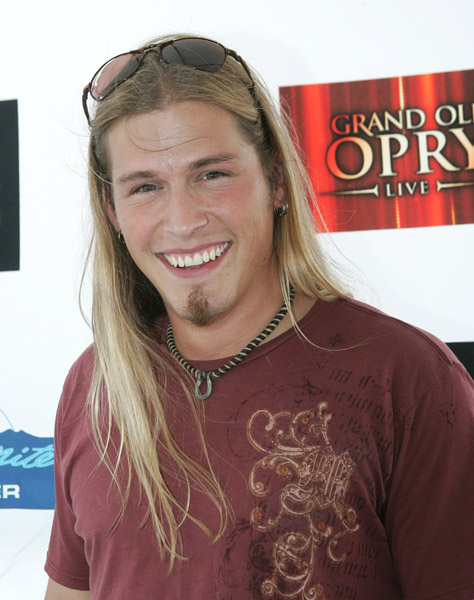
- Carroll in 2007.

Background information
- Born: June 13, 1978 (age 47); Youngsville, North Carolina, United States
- Origin: Youngsville, North Carolina, United States
- Genres: Country
- Occupation: Singer-songwriter
- Instrument: Vocals
- Years active: 2004–present
- Label: Arista Nashville
- Website: jasonmichaelcarroll.com

Jason Michael Carroll (born June 13, 1978) is an American country music artist. After being discovered at a local talent competition in 2004, Carroll was signed to the Arista Nashville label in 2006, releasing his debut album Waitin' in the Country that year. This album produced three consecutive Top 40 country hits for him on the Billboard Hot Country Songs charts: "Alyssa Lies", "Livin' Our Love Song" and "I Can Sleep When I'm Dead". Carroll's second album, Growing Up Is Getting Old, has also produced his fourth and fifth Top 40 hits. Carroll and Arista Nashville parted ways in February 2010.

== Life and career ==
Carroll grew up in a religious household in Youngsville, North Carolina. His father (James P. Carroll) was a conservative Christian minister who viewed modern music as sinful and would not allow any secular music played in the home, or even on family trips in the car. His father went so far as to spank him when he found a copy of Billy Ray Cyrus' "Achy Breaky Heart" in his bedroom.

In 2004 encouraged by his mother (Pamela Clark Carroll), Carroll won a local singing competition, WRAZ FOX 50's Gimme the Mic. During this same period, Carroll had finished writing "Alyssa Lies." Carroll says he struggled to the point of getting migraines for a year and a half before finishing the song. By the summer of 2005, Carroll was a regular along Nashville's Music Row. He later signed with the booking agency Monterey Peninsula Artists Nashville and entered a recording agreement with Arista Nashville.

== Musical career ==
=== Waitin' in the Country ===
Carroll's debut album, Waitin' in the Country, produced by Don Gehman, was released on February 6, 2007. In its opening week, it debuted at No. 1 on the Billboard Top Country Albums Charts. With first-week sales of 57,608, and a Billboard 200 pop chart entry at No. 8, Carroll had once achieved both the best unit sales and the highest pop chart debut by a new country male artist since Billy Ray Cyrus in 1993. The debut single from Waitin' in the Country, entitled "Alyssa Lies", reached No. 5 on the Hot Country Songs charts. It was followed by "Livin' Our Love Song" which peaked at No. 6. The album's third single, "I Can Sleep When I'm Dead", was released in early 2008 and peaked at No. 21.

=== Growing Up Is Getting Old ===
His fourth single, "Where I'm From" entered the charts in November 2008. It is the first single from his second album, Growing Up Is Getting Old, which was released by Arista Nashville on April 28, 2009. The single charted to No. 11 on the country charts, and a second single, "Hurry Home", was issued in June 2009. Shortly after "Hurry Home" peaked, Carroll parted ways with Arista Nashville.

=== Numbers ===
His sixth single "Numbers" was officially released to radio on March 28, 2011. It is the first single from his third album, also titled Numbers, which was released by QuarterBack/GrassRoots/Cracker Barrel partnership and sold exclusively through Cracker Barrel stores.

=== What Color Is Your Sky ===
Carroll released his fourth studio album What Color Is Your Sky on May 4, 2015.

=== Strings (Official Movie Soundtrack) ===
Carroll released his fifth studio album Strings (Official Movie Soundtrack) in 2019. A Movie Starring Carroll was released in the same year following a DVD release.

=== Rest My Soul ===
Carroll released his first gospel album on April 25, 2024.

Anthem

Carroll released a compilation of 17 tracks on March 22, 2026.

== Personal life ==
Jason Michael Carroll’s wife is Wendy Carroll (née Phillips). The couple have one son; Carroll also has three children from a previous marriage.

== Discography ==
=== Studio albums ===
Title	Album details	Peak chart positions		
Title	Album details	US Country	US	US Indie
Waitin' in the Country	Release date: February 6, 2007; Label: Arista Nashville	1	8	—
Growing Up Is Getting Old	Release date: April 28, 2009; Label: Arista Nashville	7	28	—
Numbers	Release date: July 26, 2011; Label: QuarterBack/GrassRoots/Cracker Barrel	33	198	37
What Color Is Your Sky	Release date: May 5, 2015; Label: Malaco Records/For the Lonely Records	37	—	—
Strings (Official Movie Soundtrack)	Release date: January 11, 2019; Label: For the Lonely Records	—	—	—
Rest My Soul	Release date: March 29, 2024; Label: Self-released	—	—	—
"—" denotes releases that did not chart

=== Extended plays ===
Title	Album details
Christmas on the Farm	Release date: November 2, 2010; Label: Stray Records

=== Singles ===
Year	Single	Peak chart positions			Certifications	Album
Year	Single	US Country	US	CAN Country	Certifications	Album
2006	"Alyssa Lies"	5	64	4		Waitin' in the Country
2007	"Livin' Our Love Song"	6	52	26	US: Gold	Waitin' in the Country
2008	"I Can Sleep When I'm Dead"	21	—^{A}	—		Waitin' in the Country
2008	"Where I'm From"	11	64	47		Growing Up Is Getting Old
2009	"Hurry Home"	14	99	—		Growing Up Is Getting Old
2011	"Numbers"	60	—	—		Numbers
2011	"Meet Me in the Barn"	—	—	—		Numbers
2011	"Let Me"	—	—	—		Numbers
2013	"Close Enough"	—	—	—		What Color Is Your Sky
2015	"God Only Knows"	—	—	—		What Color Is Your Sky
2018	"I Want You to Know"	—	—	—		Non-album singles
2022	"Tell Me Your Name (Diane's Song)"	—	—	—		Non-album singles
2023	"Pass It On Around"	—	—	—		Non-album singles
2023	"Sippin' on Summertime"	—	—	—		Non-album singles
"—" denotes releases that did not chart

- ^{A}"I Can Sleep When I Dead" did not enter the Hot 100, but peaked at number 15 on Bubbling Under Hot 100 Singles.

=== Music videos ===
Year	Video	Director
2007	"Livin' Our Love Song"	David McClister
2008	"I Can Sleep When I'm Dead"	David McClister
2009	"Hurry Home"	Chris Hicky
2011	"Meet Me in the Barn"	Brett Bortle
2013	"Close Enough"	Brett Bortle
2022	"Tell Me Your Name (Diane's Song)"	Brett Bortle
