= Rodney Atkins discography =

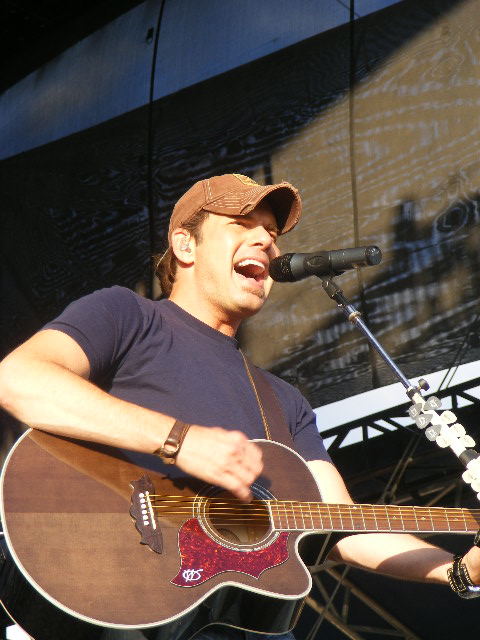
- Atkins in July 2009
- Studio albums: 6
- Singles: 24
- Music videos: 14
- No. 1 singles: 6

The discography of Rodney Atkins, an American country music singer, consists of six studio albums and 24 singles. Although Atkins first entered the Country Airplay charts in 1997 with "In a Heartbeat", he did not reach top 40 until 2002. His first top 5 hit, "Honesty (Write Me a List)", came in late 2003-early 2004. Between 2006 and 2008, Atkins charted four straight number 1 singles: "If You're Going Through Hell (Before the Devil Even Knows)", "Watching You", "These Are My People" and "Cleaning This Gun (Come On In Boy)", all from his second album, If You're Going Through Hell. It's America (2009) and Take a Back Road (2011) also included number 1 singles in their respective title tracks, with a re-issue of the latter also containing the top 5 hit "Farmer's Daughter".

== Studio albums ==
Title	Details	Peak chart positions			Certifications (sales threshold)
Title	Details	US Country	US	US Heat	Certifications (sales threshold)
Honesty	Release date: October 14, 2003; Label: Curb Records; Formats: CD	50	—	47	
If You're Going Through Hell	Release date: July 18, 2006; Label: Curb Records; Formats: CD, download	1	3	—	RIAA: 2× Platinum
It's America	Release date: March 31, 2009; Label: Curb Records; Formats: CD, download	3	15	—	RIAA: Gold
Take a Back Road	Release date: October 4, 2011; Label: Curb Records; Formats: CD, download	3	8	—	RIAA: Platinum
Caught Up in the Country	Release date: May 10, 2019; Label: Curb Records; Formats: CD, download	28	— (Note: Caught Up in the Country did not enter the Billboard 200, but peaked at number 54 on the Top Album Sales chart.)	—	
True South	Release date: May 29, 2026; Label: Curb Records; Formats: CD, vinyl, download	—	—	—	
"—" denotes releases that did not chart

== Compilation albums ==
Title	Details	Peak chart positions	
Title	Details	US Country	US
Rodney Atkins	Release date: September 7, 2010; Label: Cracker Barrel; Formats: CD	11	64
Greatest Hits	Release date: February 3, 2015; Label: Curb Records; Formats: CD, music download	28	—
"—" denotes releases that did not chart

== Singles ==
=== 1990s and 2000s ===
Year	Single	Peak chart positions				Certifications (sales threshold)	Album
Year	Single	US Country	US	CAN Country	CAN	Certifications (sales threshold)	Album
1997	"In a Heartbeat"	74	—	—	—		Rodney Atkins (unreleased)
1997	"God Only Knows"	—	—	—	—		Rodney Atkins (unreleased)
2002	"Sing Along"	37	—	*	—		Honesty
2002	"My Old Man"	36	—	*	—		Honesty
2003	"Honesty (Write Me a List)"	4	57	*	—		Honesty
2004	"Someone to Share It With"	41	—	—	—		Honesty
2004	"Monkey in the Middle"	—	—	—	—		Honesty
2006	"If You're Going Through Hell (Before the Devil Even Knows)"	1	33	1	—	RIAA: Platinum	If You're Going Through Hell
2006	"Watching You"	1	36	3	—	RIAA: 3× Platinum	If You're Going Through Hell
2007	"These Are My People"	1	42	11	—	RIAA: Platinum	If You're Going Through Hell
2007	"Cleaning This Gun (Come On In Boy)"	1	40	5	84	RIAA: Platinum	If You're Going Through Hell
2008	"Invisibly Shaken"	41	—	—	—		If You're Going Through Hell
2008	"It's America"	1	44	—	—	RIAA: Gold	It's America
2009	"15 Minutes"	20	— (Note: "15 Minutes" did not enter the Hot 100, but peaked at number 15 on Bubbling Under Hot 100 Singles, which acts as a 25-song extension of the Hot 100.)	38	—		It's America
2009	"Chasin' Girls"	48	—	—	—		It's America
"—" denotes releases that did not chart "*" denotes releases where no chart existed

=== 2010s–2020s ===
Year	Single	Peak chart positions					Certifications (sales threshold)	Album
Year	Single	US Country	US Country Airplay	US	CAN Country	CAN	Certifications (sales threshold)	Album
2010	"Farmer's Daughter"	5		47	25	—	RIAA: 3× Platinum	It's America (re-release)
2011	"Take a Back Road"	1		23	1	48	RIAA: 3× Platinum	Take a Back Road
2011	"He's Mine"	23		— (Note: "He's Mine" did not enter the Hot 100, but peaked at number 3 on Bubbling Under Hot 100 Singles, which acts as a 25-song extension of the Hot 100.)	49	—	RIAA: Platinum	Take a Back Road
2012	"Just Wanna Rock N' Roll"	39	31	—	—	—		Take a Back Road
2013	"Doin' It Right"	—	53	—	—	—		Non-album single
2014	"Eat Sleep Love You Repeat"	—	47	—	—	—		Greatest Hits
2018	"Caught Up in the Country" (featuring the Fisk Jubilee Singers)	20	21	— (Note: "Caught Up in the Country" did not enter the Hot 100, but peaked at number six on Bubbling Under Hot 100 Singles, which acts as a 25-song extension of the Hot 100.)	46	—	RIAA: 2× Platinum; RMNZ: Gold	Caught Up in the Country
2019	"Thank God for You"	—	43	—	—	—		Caught Up in the Country
2026	"The Years Are Short"	—	57	—	—	—		True South
"—" denotes releases that did not chart

=== Promotional singles ===
Year	Title	Album
2019	"My Life"	Caught Up in the Country
2019	"What Lonely Looks Like"	Caught Up in the Country
2019	"Figure You Out (Riddle)"	Caught Up in the Country
2021	"A Little Good News"	Non-album single
2024	"True South"	True South
2025	"Marry Me Again"	True South
2025	"Watching You 2.0" (with Eliah Atkins)	True South
2025	"Helluvit"	True South
2026	"Hole in One"	True South

== Music videos ==
Year	Video	Director
1997	"In a Heartbeat"	Jeffrey C. Phillips
2002	"Sing Along"	Wes Edwards
2003	"Honesty (Write Me a List)"	Steven Goldmann
2006	"If You're Going Through Hell (Before the Devil Even Knows)"	Eric Welch
2006	"Watching You"	Eric Welch
2007	"These Are My People"	Eric Welch
2008	"Invisibly Shaken"	Eric Welch
2009	"It's America"	Eric Welch
2010	"Farmer's Daughter"	Chris Hicky
2011	"Take a Back Road"	Andy Tennant
2012	"He's Mine"	Ry Cox
2012	"Just Wanna Rock N' Roll"	Todd Cassetty
2014	"Right" (with Bubba Sparxxx)	
2015	"Eat Sleep Love You Repeat"	John Ward/Roman White
2018	"Caught Up in the Country"	PJ Brown
2019	"Thank God for You"	PJ Brown
2025	"Helluvit"	—N/a
