= Greatest Hits (Rodney Atkins album) =

Greatest hits album by Rodney Atkins
- Released: February 3, 2015
- Recorded: 2003–11
- Genre: Country
- Length: 41:58
- Label: Curb Records
- Producer: Rodney Atkins, Ted Hewitt

Rodney Atkins chronology
Take a Back Road (2011)	Greatest Hits (2015)	Caught Up in the Country (2019)

Singles from Greatest Hits
- 1. "Eat Sleep Love You Repeat" Released: November 17, 2014

Greatest Hits is the first compilation album by American country music artist Rodney Atkins. It was released on February 3, 2015 by Curb Records. The album features twelve songs, including Atkins' six number one hits. It also includes one new song, "Eat Sleep Love You Repeat", which was released as a single.

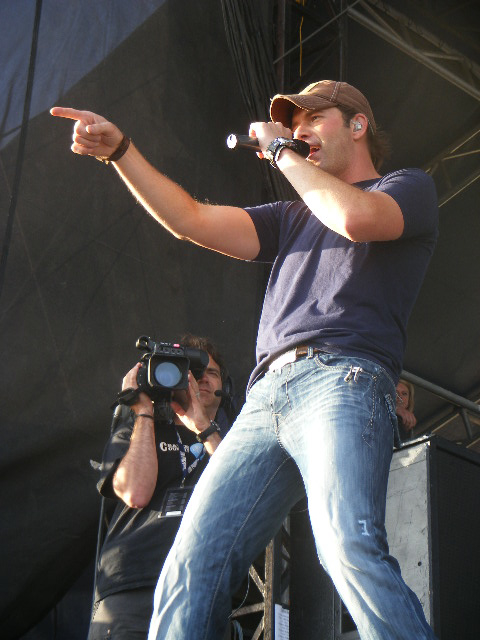
Rodney Atkins in 2009

== Track listing ==
No.	Title	Writer(s)	Length
1.	"If You're Going Through Hell (Before the Devil Even Knows)"	Sam Tate, Annie Tate, Dave Berg	3:36
2.	"Watching You"	Rodney Atkins, Steve Dean, Brian Gene White	3:55
3.	"These Are My People"	Berg, Rivers Rutherford	3:33
4.	"Cleaning This Gun (Come On In Boy)"	Casey Beathard, Marla Cannon-Goodman	3:46
5.	"Take a Back Road"	Rhett Akins, Luke Laird	3:28
6.	"Farmer's Daughter"	Marv Green, Akins, Ben Hayslip	3:27
7.	"It's America"	Brett James, Angelo Petraglia	3:33
8.	"Invisibly Shaken"	Atkins, Billy Kirsch	3:46
9.	"Honesty (Write Me a List)"	Patience Clemens, David Kent	4:15
10.	"He's Mine"	Beathard, Tim James, Phil O'Donnell	3:11
11.	"About the South"	Atkins, Tom Hambridge, Shane Minor	2:58
12.	"Eat Sleep Love You Repeat"	Ryan Bizarri, Walker Hayes	2:30

== Chart performance ==
The album debuted on the Top Country Albums chart at No. 28, with 1,800 copies sold.

=== Album ===
Chart (2015)	Peak position
US Top Country Albums (Billboard)	28

=== Singles ===
Year	Single	Peak positions
Year	Single	US Country Airplay
2014	"Eat Sleep Love You Repeat"	47
