= 43rd Academy of Country Music Awards =

- Date: May 18, 2008
- Location: MGM Grand Garden Arena, Las Vegas, Nevada
- Hosted by: Reba McEntire

Highlights
- Most wins: Kenny Chesney; Brad Paisley (2 each)
- Most nominations: Kenny Chesney (7)

Television/radio coverage
- Network: CBS

The 43rd Academy of Country Music Awards were held on May 18, 2008, at the MGM Grand Garden Arena, Las Vegas, Nevada. The ceremony was hosted by ACM Award Winner Reba McEntire.

== Winners and nominees ==
Winners are shown in bold.

Entertainer of the Year (Note: From 2008 to 2015, 'Entertainer of the Year' was decided by a combination of ACM professional membership and fan votes cast online and via text message.)	Album of the Year
**Kenny Chesney**; Brad Paisley; Rascal Flatts; George Strait; Keith Urban	**Crazy Ex-Girlfriend — Miranda Lambert**; 5th Gear — Brad Paisley; Just Who I Am: Poets & Pirates — Kenny Chesney; If You’re Going Through Hell — Rodney Atkins; Taylor Swift — Taylor Swift
Top Female Vocalist of the Year	Top Male Vocalist of the Year
**Carrie Underwood**; Miranda Lambert; Martina McBride; LeAnn Rimes; Taylor Swift	**Brad Paisley**; Rodney Atkins; Kenny Chesney; George Strait; Keith Urban
Top Vocal Group of the Year	Top Vocal Duo of the Year
**Rascal Flatts**; Diamond Rio; The Eagles; Emerson Drive; Little Big Town	**Brooks & Dunn**; Big & Rich; Halfway To Hazard; Montgomery Gentry; Sugarland
Single Record of the Year	Song of the Year
**“Stay” — Sugarland**; “Don’t Blink” — Kenny Chesney; “Famous in a Small Town” — Miranda Lambert; “Lost in This Moment” — Big & Rich; “Watching Airplanes” — Gary Allan	**“Stay” — Jennifer Nettles**; “Don’t Blink” — Casey Beathard, Chris Wallin; “Lost in This Moment” — Keith Anderson, Rodney Clawson, John Rich; “Moments” — Dave Berg, Annie Tate, Sam Tate; “Watching You” — Rodney Atkins, Steve Dean, Brian White
Top New Male Vocalist	Top New Female Vocalist
**Jack Ingram**; Luke Bryan; Jake Owen	**Taylor Swift**; Sarah Buxton; Kellie Pickler
Top New Vocal Duo or Group of the Year	Video of the Year
**Lady Antebellum**; Carolina Rain; The Wreckers	**"Online" — Brad Paisley**; "Don't Blink" — Kenny Chesney; "Lost in This Moment" — Big & Rich; "Stay" — Sugarland; "Watching You" — Rodney Atkins
Vocal Event of the Year
**“Find Out Who Your Friends Are” — Tracy Lawrence with Tim McGraw and Kenny Chesney**; “Because of You” — Reba McEntire with Kelly Clarkson; “Shiftwork” — Kenny Chesney with George Strait; “Till We Ain’t Strangers Anymore” — LeAnn Rimes with Bon Jovi; “What You Give Away” — Vince Gill with Sheryl Crow

== Performers ==
Performer(s)	Song(s)
Carrie Underwood	"Last Name"
Toby Keith	"She's a Hottie"
Brad Paisley	"I'm Still a Guy"
Miranda Lambert	"Gunpowder & Lead"
Rodney Atkins	Number Ones Medley "Watching You" "These Are My People" "Cleaning This Gun (Come On In Boy)" "If You're Going Through Hell (Before the Devil Even Knows)"
Kenny Chesney; George Strait	"Better as a Memory" "I Saw God Today" "Shiftwork"
Sugarland	"All I Want to Do"
Brooks & Dunn; Reba McEntire	"Put a Girl in It"
Taylor Swift	"Should've Said No"
Trace Adkins	"You're Gonna Miss This"
Garth Brooks; Trisha Yearwood	Greatest Hits Medley "The Thunder Rolls" "Callin' Baton Rouge" "Friends in Low Places" "We Shall Be Free" "The Dance" "Good Ride Cowboy" "In Another's Eyes" "More Than a Memory" "Rodeo" "Ain't Goin' Down ('Til the Sun Comes Up)"
Keith Urban	"Tu Compañía"
Rascal Flatts	"Every Day"
Carrie Underwood; Brad Paisley	Eddy Arnold Tribute "Make the World Go Away"
Kellie Pickler	"Don't You Know You're Beautiful"
LeAnn Rimes	"Family"
Montgomery Gentry	"Back When I Knew It All"

== Presenters ==
Presenter(s)	Notes
Poppy Montgomery; Criss Angel	Single Record of the Year
Jason Alexander	Brad Paisley performance
Lady Antebellum	Top New Female Vocalist of the Year
Blake Shelton	Miranda Lambert performance
Little Big Town	Top New Duo or Vocal Group of the Year
Clay Walker; Brad Mates	Top New Male Vocalist of the Year
Jewel; John Rich	Album of the Year
Randy Owen	Las Vegas backstage
Julianne Hough; Clint Black	Song of the Year
Brooks & Dunn	Present Home Depot Humanitarian Award for Rascal Flatts
Phil McGraw; Robin McGraw	Top Vocal Duo of the Year
Kaley Cuoco; Kimbo Slice	Top Vocal Group of the Year
David Spade	Rascal Flatts performance
Sara Evans	Kellie Pickler performance
Trisha Yearwood	Top Male Vocalist of the Year
Karolína Kurková; Dwight Yoakam	Top Female Vocalist of the Year
