= List of Top Country Albums number ones of 2006 =

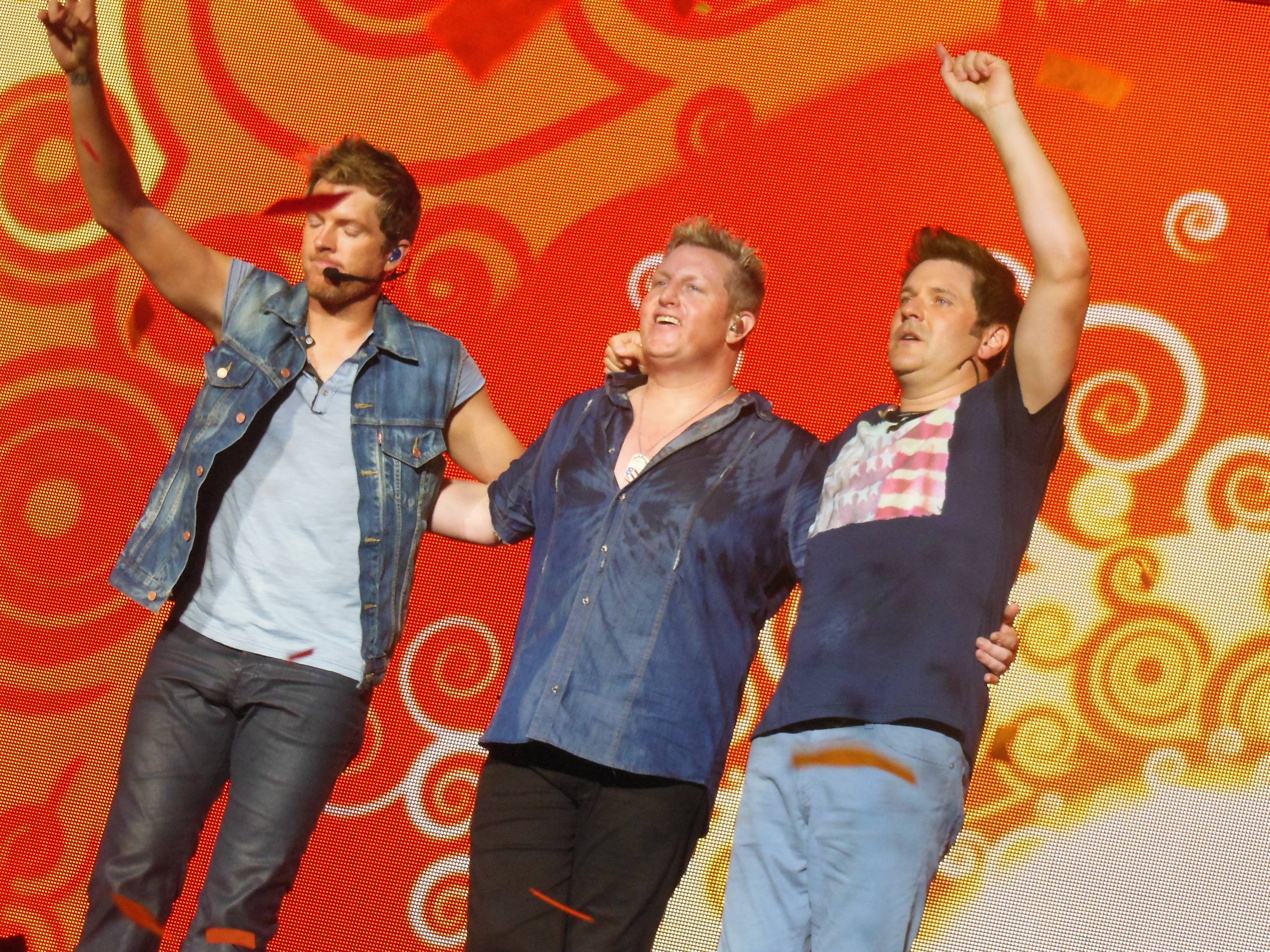
Rascal Flatts had a long-running number one with Me and My Gang.

Top Country Albums is a chart that ranks the top-performing country music albums in the United States, published by Billboard. In 2006, 17 different albums topped the chart, based on electronic point of sale data provided by SoundScan Inc.

The year both began and ended with Carrie Underwood's album Some Hearts at number one. Underwood had won the fourth season of TV singing competition American Idol in 2005, and Some Hearts, her debut album had reached number one in December of that year. In the issue of Billboard dated January 7, it spent its fifth week at number one, and occupied the top spot for 11 of the first 13 weeks of the year, its time atop the listing being interrupted for one week by Josh Turner's Your Man and for one week by Alan Jackson's Precious Memories. In December, shortly after it was named Album of the Year at the 2006 Billboard Music Awards, Some Hearts returned to number one, more than eight months after it had last occupied the top spot, and remained there for the final three weeks of the year. It was the best-selling album of 2006 in the US, and such was its enduring popularity that it was the biggest-selling country music album of both 2006 and 2007.

Alan Jackson was the only act to achieve more than one number one in 2006; following the single week he spent at number one with Precious Memories in March, he returned to number one in October with Like Red on a Rose. Three acts reached number one for the first time in 2006: Josh Turner with Your Man in February, Rodney Atkins with If You're Going Through Hell in August and Kellie Pickler, like Carrie Underwood a former American Idol finalist, with Small Town Girl in November. Johnny Cash, who had died in 2003, had a posthumous number one in July with American V: A Hundred Highways. It was his first chart-topper since 1971. The album also reached number one on the all-genre Billboard 200 chart, as did Me and My Gang by Rascal Flatts and Taking the Long Way by the Dixie Chicks. Despite being the year's biggest-selling album of any genre, Carrie Underwood's Some Hearts could only peak at number two on the Billboard 200. Me and My Gang spent 13 weeks atop the country listing, the most by any album during 2006. In November, Alabama, one of the most successful country music acts of the 1980s, ended another lengthy absence from the top of the country albums chart when Songs of Inspiration became the band's first number one since 1989.

== Chart history ==
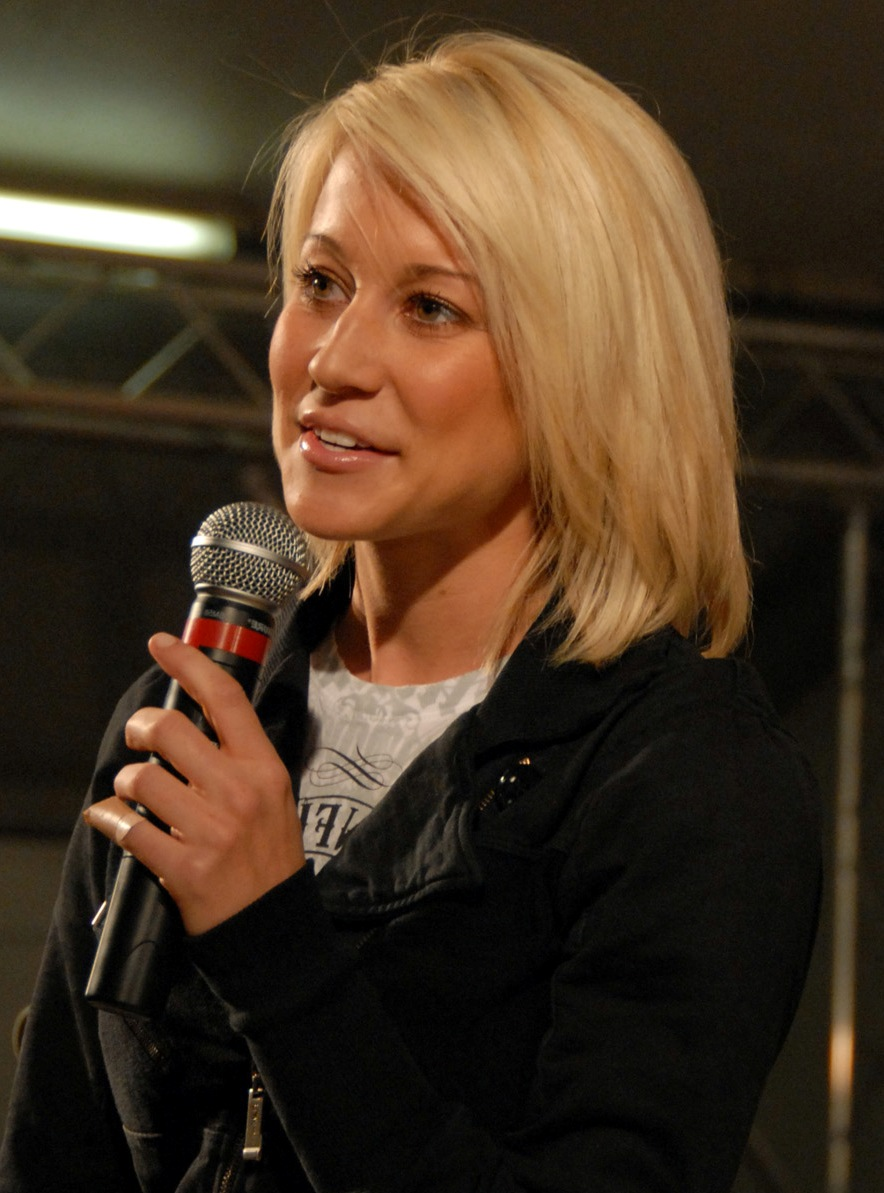
Small Town Girl was the first number one for Kellie Pickler.

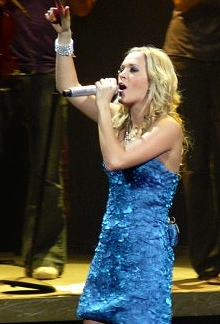
Carrie Underwood spent 14 weeks at number one in 2006, the most by any act.

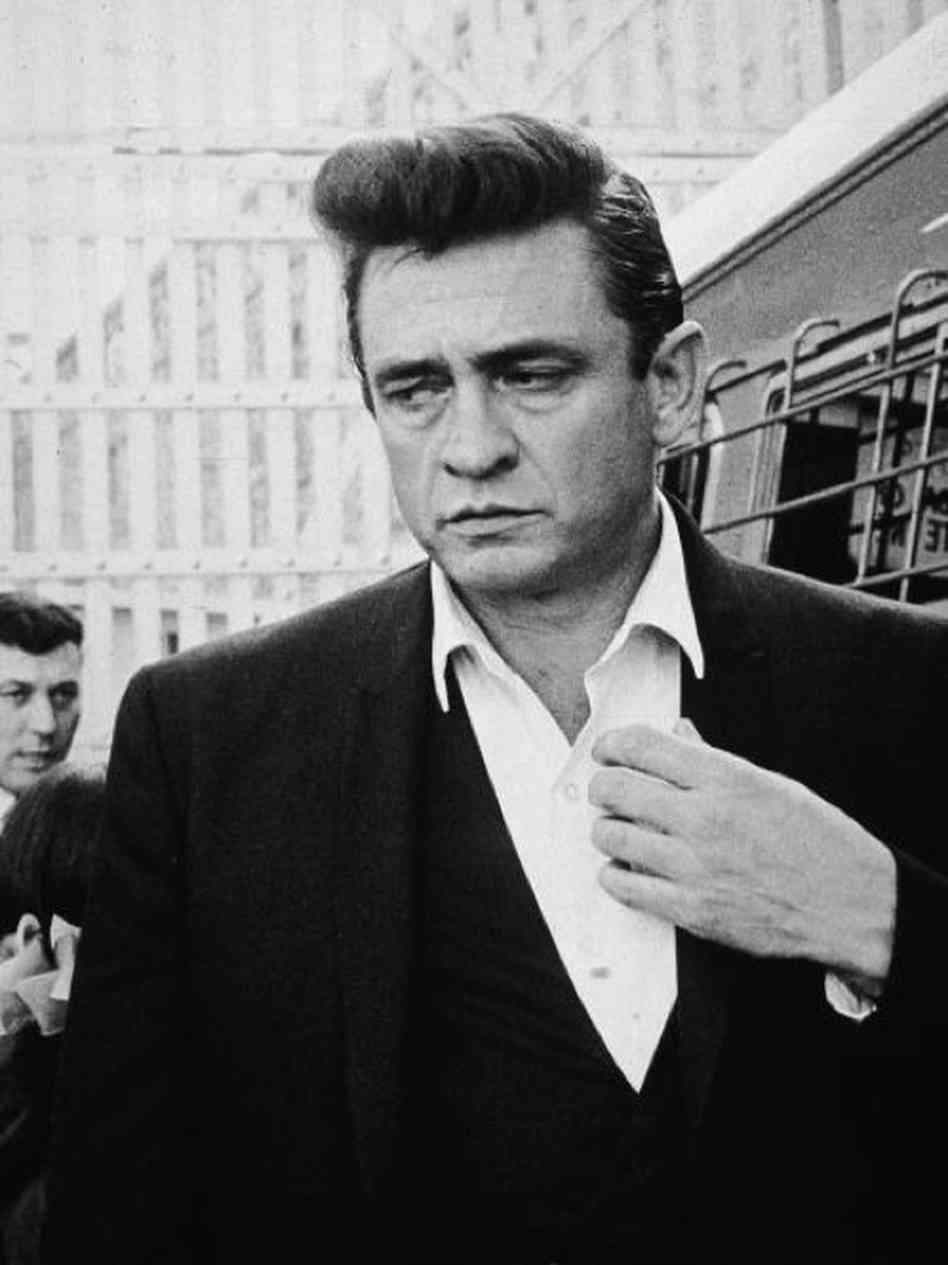
Johnny Cash (pictured in 1970) had a posthumous number one with American V: A Hundred Highways.

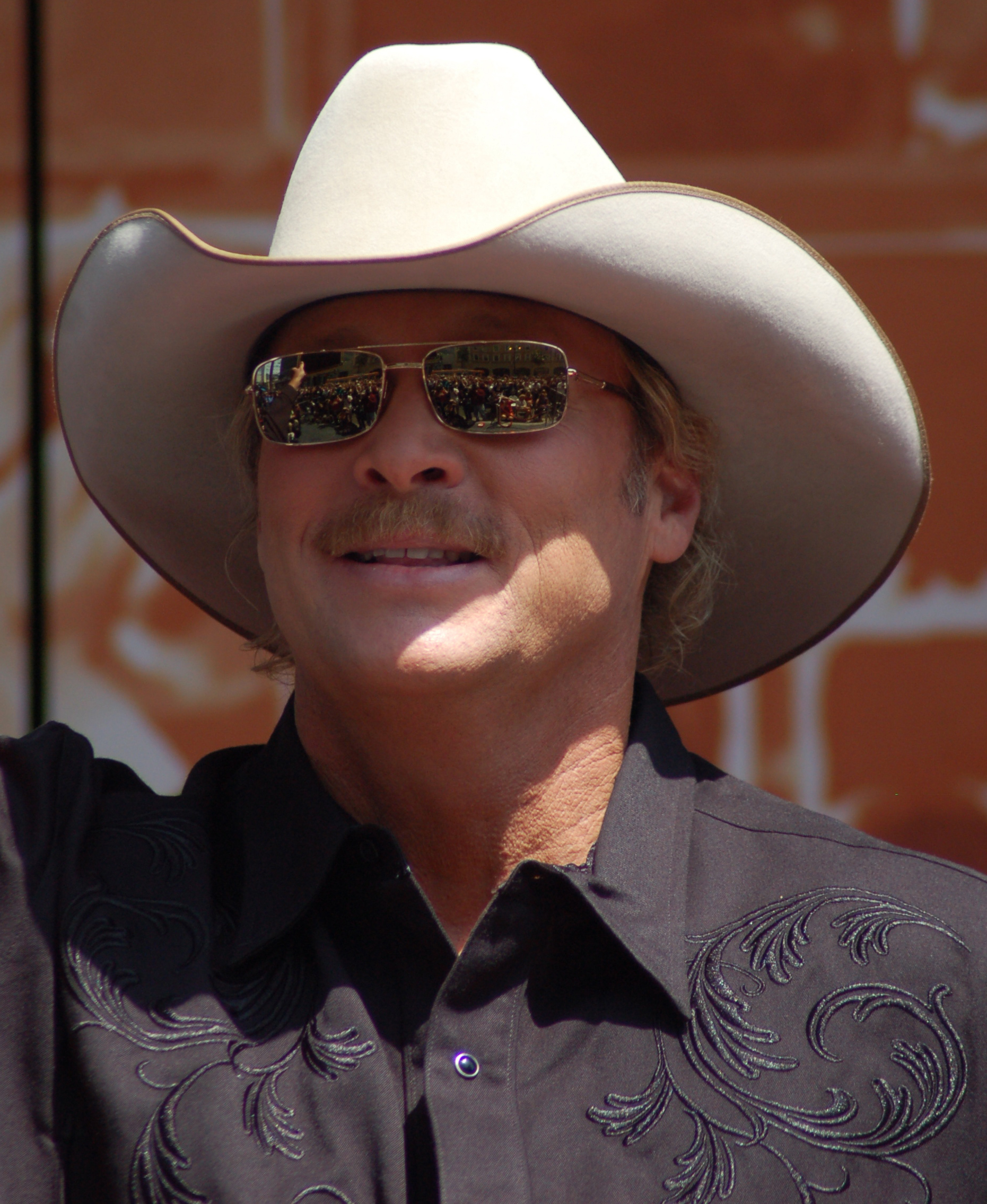
Alan Jackson was the only act to achieve more than one number one in 2006.

| Issue date | Title | Artist(s) | Ref. |
|---|---|---|---|
| January 7 | Some Hearts | Carrie Underwood | |
| January 14 | Some Hearts | Carrie Underwood | |
| January 21 | Some Hearts | Carrie Underwood | |
| January 28 | Some Hearts | Carrie Underwood | |
| February 4 | Some Hearts | Carrie Underwood | |
| February 11 | Your Man | Josh Turner | |
| February 18 | Some Hearts | Carrie Underwood | |
| February 25 | Some Hearts | Carrie Underwood | |
| March 4 | Some Hearts | Carrie Underwood | |
| March 11 | Some Hearts | Carrie Underwood | |
| March 18 | Precious Memories | Alan Jackson | |
| March 25 | Some Hearts | Carrie Underwood | |
| April 1 | Some Hearts | Carrie Underwood | |
| April 8 | Precious Memories | Alan Jackson | |
| April 15 | Reflected: Greatest Hits Vol. 2 | Tim McGraw | |
| April 22 | Me and My Gang | Rascal Flatts | |
| April 29 | Me and My Gang | Rascal Flatts | |
| May 6 | Me and My Gang | Rascal Flatts | |
| May 13 | Me and My Gang | Rascal Flatts | |
| May 20 | Me and My Gang | Rascal Flatts | |
| May 27 | Me and My Gang | Rascal Flatts | |
| June 3 | Me and My Gang | Rascal Flatts | |
| June 10 | Taking the Long Way | Dixie Chicks | |
| June 17 | Taking the Long Way | Dixie Chicks | |
| June 24 | Taking the Long Way | Dixie Chicks | |
| July 1 | Taking the Long Way | Dixie Chicks | |
| July 8 | Taking the Long Way | Dixie Chicks | |
| July 15 | Taking the Long Way | Dixie Chicks | |
| July 22 | American V: A Hundred Highways | Johnny Cash | |
| July 29 | American V: A Hundred Highways | Johnny Cash | |
| August 5 | If You're Going Through Hell | Rodney Atkins | |
| August 12 | Me and My Gang | Rascal Flatts | |
| August 19 | Me and My Gang | Rascal Flatts | |
| August 26 | Me and My Gang | Rascal Flatts | |
| September 2 | Dangerous Man | Trace Adkins | |
| September 9 | Dangerous Man | Trace Adkins | |
| September 16 | Me and My Gang | Rascal Flatts | |
| September 23 | Me and My Gang | Rascal Flatts | |
| September 30 | Me and My Gang | Rascal Flatts | |
| October 7 | Live: Live Those Songs Again | Kenny Chesney | |
| October 14 | Like Red on a Rose | Alan Jackson | |
| October 21 | It Just Comes Natural | George Strait | |
| October 28 | Take the Weather with You | Jimmy Buffett | |
| November 4 | Long Trip Alone | Dierks Bentley | |
| November 11 | Songs of Inspiration | Alabama | |
| November 18 | Small Town Girl | Kellie Pickler | |
| November 25 | Love, Pain & the Whole Crazy Thing | Keith Urban | |
| December 2 | Love, Pain & the Whole Crazy Thing | Keith Urban | |
| December 9 | Love, Pain & the Whole Crazy Thing | Keith Urban | |
| December 16 | Some Hearts | Carrie Underwood | |
| December 23 | Some Hearts | Carrie Underwood | |
| December 30 | Some Hearts | Carrie Underwood | |
