= It's America =

Studio album by Rodney Atkins
- Released: March 31, 2009
- Recorded: 2008–2009
- Genre: Country
- Length: 37:13
- Label: Curb Records
- Producer: Ted Hewitt; Rodney Atkins

Rodney Atkins chronology
If You're Going Through Hell (2006)	It's America (2009)	Take a Back Road (2011)

Singles from It's America
- 1. "It's America" Released: November 24, 2008; 2. "15 Minutes" Released: May 26, 2009; 3. "Chasin' Girls" Released: October 26, 2009; 4. "Farmer's Daughter" Released: March 29, 2010

It's America is the third studio album by American country music artist Rodney Atkins. It was released on March 31, 2009 by Curb Records. The album's first single, its title track, was released on November 24, 2008 and became Atkins' fifth number one hit on the U.S. Billboard Hot Country Songs chart. It was followed by "15 Minutes" (a Top 20 hit) and "Chasin' Girls." The album was re-issued in mid-2010 to include a new single, "Farmer's Daughter."

The album debuted at No. 15 on Billboard's album chart selling 34,877 copies.

As of August 2010, the album has sold 129,820 copies in the US.

== Singles ==
The album's first single release was its title track, written by Brett James and Angelo Petraglia. Released in late 2008, the song went on to become the fifth Number One single of his career. It was followed by "15 Minutes" at number 20, and "Chasin' Girls", which failed to make the Top 40. The latter was partially re-written for its radio edit. The song debuted in September 2009 but failed to reach the country Top 40, peaking at No. 48.

In March 2010, the album was re-released with "Farmer's Daughter" added to the track list, and the radio edit of "Chasin' Girls" in place of the original recording. "Farmer's Daughter" has reached Top 20 on Hot Country Songs.

== Critical reception ==
Professional ratings
Review scores
Source	Rating
About.com	5/5 stars
Allmusic	3/5 stars
People	3/4 stars
Robert Christgau	(dud)
Roughstock	3/5 stars
Engine 145	2/5 stars

Todd Sterling of Allmusic rated the album three stars out of five, saying that Atkins "plays it safe and sticks to the same formula used on If You're Going Through Hell." Also giving it three stars, Roughstock critic Liz Jungers thought that the album was "feel-good through and through" and that it had "killer musicianship," but criticized it for lacking musical variety. Pierce Greenberg of Engine 145 also criticized the album for having too many "frothy feel-good, I-am-blessed" songs, saying that it such songs "would benefit from being on a more diverse album." He rated the album two stars out of five. In his Consumer Guide, Robert Christgau gave the album a "dud" rating, calling it "a bad record whose details rarely merit further thought."

== Track listing ==
No.	Title	Writer(s)	Length
1.	"Tell a Country Boy"	Neal Coty, Jon Henderson	3:31
2.	"Chasin' Girls"	Rodney Atkins, Ted Hewitt, Steve Dean	3:29
3.	"Got It Good"	Atkins, Casey Beathard, Ed Hill	3:33
4.	"Best Things"	Beathard, James T. Slater	2:55
5.	"Friends with Tractors"	Dallas Davidson, Ben Hayslip, Rhett Akins	3:31
6.	"15 Minutes"	Tony Mullins, Jamie Lee Thurston	2:39
7.	"Simple Things"	Atkins, Dave Berg, Rivers Rutherford	3:18
8.	"It's America"	Brett James, Angelo Petraglia	3:31
9.	"Rockin' of the Cradle"	Doug Johnson, Kim Williams	3:28
10.	"When It's My Time"	Berg, Connie Harrington, Wendell Mobley	3:35
11.	"The River Just Knows"	Berg, Sam Tate, Annie Tate	3:39

Bonus track
No.	Title	Writer(s)	Length
1.	"Farmer's Daughter"	Marv Green, Akins, Hayslip	3:24

== Personnel ==
- Rodney Atkins – lead vocals
- Liam Bailey – background vocals
- Tim Buppert – background vocals
- Larry Franklin – fiddle
- Ted Hewitt – 12-string guitar, acoustic guitar, electric guitar, background vocals
- Angela Hurt – background vocals
- Mike Johnson – Dobro, steel guitar, lap steel guitar
- Troy Lancaster – electric guitar
- Gordon Mote – keyboards
- Larry Paxton – bass guitar
- Gary Prim – keyboards
- Kevin Rapillo – percussion
- Duane Sciacqua – electric guitar
- Steve Sheehan – acoustic guitar
- J.D. Simo – electric guitar
- Bryan Sutton – banjo, acoustic guitar
- Lonnie Wilson – drums
- Jonathan Yudkin – fiddle

== Chart performance ==
=== Weekly charts ===
Chart (2009)	Peak position
US Billboard 200	15
US Top Country Albums (Billboard)	3

=== Year-end charts ===
Chart (2009)	Position
US Top Country Albums (Billboard)	56

=== Singles ===
Year	Single	Peak chart positions	
Year	Single	US Country	US
2008	"It's America"	1	44
2009	"15 Minutes"	20	115
2009	"Chasin' Girls"	48	—
2010	"Farmer's Daughter"	5	47
"—" denotes releases that did not chart
