= Another Perfect Day (disambiguation) =

Another Perfect Day is an album by Motörhead

Another Perfect Day may also refer to:

- "Another Perfect Day" (song), the single from American Hi-Fi's self-titled debut album
- "Another Perfect Day", a single from the country music duo Blake & Brian
- "Another Perfect Day", a single from the Boom Boom Satellites album Embrace, used in Starship Troopers: Invasion
- "Another Perfect Day?", a single from the Electric Wizard album We Live
- "Another Perfect Day", a song from the Motörhead album
- "Another Perfect Day", a song from the Fates Warning album FWX
