= The Family Trade =

The Family Trade may refer to:

- The Family Trade, a 2003 science fantasy novel and the first book in The Merchant Princes series by Charles Stross
- Family Trade, a 2013 reality television series broadcast by Game Show Network
