= Doing It Right =

Doing It Right or Doin' It Right may refer to:

== Music ==
=== Albums ===
- Doin' It Right, a 1972 album by Denise LaSalle
- Doin' It Right, a 1972 album by Mike James Kirkland
- Doin' It Right, a 1989 album by Hilton Ruiz
- Doin' It Right, a 2003 album by Freddie McKay
- Hecho y Derecho (Doin' It Right), a 1973 album by Joe Cuba

=== Songs ===
- "Doin' It Right", a 2013 song by Daft Punk
- "Doin' It Right", a 1975 song by The Boomtown Rats later reissued on The Boomtown Rats
- "Doin' It Right", a 1980 song by the Powder Blues Band from Uncut
- "Doin' It Right", a 1981 song by Barbara Mandrell from Barbara Mandrell Live
- "Doin' It Right", a 1989 song by Hilton Ruiz
- "Doin' It Right", a 2002 song by Sizzla
- "Doin' It Right", a 2003 song by Kenny Loggins from It's About Time
- "Doin' It Right", a 2005 song by Steve Azar
- "Doing It Right", a 2007 song by The Go! Team from Proof of Youth
- "Doin' It Right", a 2013 single by Rodney Atkins
- "Doin' It Right", a 2017 song by Carly Pearce from Every Little Thing

== Other uses ==
- Doing It Right (scuba diving), an approach to scuba diving focusing on dive kit setup, safety and procedure
- Doin It Right, a 1995 film featuring Jason Stuart

== See also ==
- Doing It Wrong (disambiguation)
