= Caught Up in the Country (song) =

Single by Rodney Atkins featuring the Fisk Jubilee Singers

from the album Caught Up in the Country
- Released: March 4, 2018
- Genre: Country
- Length: 2:40
- Label: Curb
- Songwriters: Connie Harrington; Jordan Schmidt; Mike Walker
- Producers: Rodney Atkins; Ted Hewitt; Blake Bollinger

Rodney Atkins singles chronology
| "Eat Sleep Love You Repeat" (2014) | "Caught Up in the Country" (2018) | "Thank God for You" (2019) |

"Caught Up in the Country" is a song recorded by American country music singer Rodney Atkins, featuring vocals from the Fisk Jubilee Singers. It was written by Connie Harrington, Jordan Schmidt, and Mike Walker, and was released in March 2018 on Curb Records. The song is the lead single and title track of his 2019 album of the same name.

== Content ==
The song is an "upbeat salute to rural life", featuring vocals from the Fisk Jubilee Singers. Atkins aid that "It's organic and it's got a lot of energy...It represents what I've been caught up in."

== Chart performance ==
For the week of April 13, 2018, the song debuted at number 59 on the Country Airplay chart. The song spent 57 weeks on the Country Airplay charts before achieving a peak of number 21, setting a new record for the longest chart run in that chart's history. This record has since been broken by Jimmie Allen's "Make Me Want To" (59 weeks) in March 2020. The same week it achieved this feat, it was certified gold by the Recording Industry Association of America (RIAA).

=== Weekly charts ===
| Chart (2018–2019) | Peak position |
|---|---|
| Canada Country (Billboard) | 46 |
| US Bubbling Under Hot 100 (Billboard) | 6 |
| US Hot Country Songs (Billboard) | 20 |
| US Country Airplay (Billboard) | 21 |

=== Year-end charts ===
| Chart (2018) | Position |
|---|---|
| US Hot Country Songs (Billboard) | 100 |
| Chart (2019) | Position |
| US Hot Country Songs (Billboard) | 67 |

== Certifications ==
| Region | Certification | Certified units/sales |
|---|---|---|
| United States (RIAA) | 2× Platinum | 2,000,000^{‡} |
^{‡} Sales+streaming figures based on certification alone.
