= He's Mine (Billy Ray Cyrus song) =

Single by Rodney Atkins

from the album Take a Back Road
- Released: November 7, 2011
- Genre: Country
- Length: 3:12
- Label: Curb
- Songwriters: Casey Beathard; Tim James; Phil O'Donnell
- Producers: Ted Hewitt; Rodney Atkins

Rodney Atkins singles chronology
"Take a Back Road" (2011)	"He's Mine" (2011)	"Just Wanna Rock N' Roll" (2012)

"He's Mine" is a song written by Casey Beathard, Tim James, and Phil O'Donnell. It was originally recorded by American country music artist Billy Ray Cyrus on his 2009 album Back to Tennessee. The song was later recorded by Rodney Atkins and released in November 2011 as the second single from his 2011 album Take a Back Road.

== Background and Content ==
This song finds Atkins singing about the love between a father and a son. Atkins has a son named Elijah, who he previously wrote about in his 2006 single "Watching You." He told Billboard magazine, "That little boy I'm singing about in 'Watching You' — my 'four-year-old [who] said a four-letter word' — turned 10 this week. The song is one of the edgiest things I've ever cut. I think we blew up an amp. It's really about unconditional love."

The song was originally going to be titled "She's Mine", with lyrics about a rebellious little girl. After Beathard, James, and O'Donnell all stumbled around for a bit with that concept, Beathard came up with idea of calling it "He's Mine" instead, as well as mixing together parts of their kids with memories of when they were young. "[In this song, there's] little parts of our place out here in Hickman County, Tennessee," O'Donnell told Taste of Country. "We have a holler where the kids go to play pinball and shoot .22 rifles. Casey has a house by a big ol' holler in the Thompson Station area, and let's just say Tim is the kid smoking in the song when he was young [laughs]!"

Atkins told Taste Of Country that he first heard the tune in the mid-2000s while working on his If You're Going Through Hell album. "I loved the song," he said. "It seems like it's dark from the front of it, but it's not. I love the language. The way I grew up, I could see that happen ... the old man knocking on my front door, having him by the collar ... just kind of accusatory. I've been there, and I can see that picture in my head. I think it's very real, and it says it in a different way. If it can connect, that will be great, because I've seen that reaction live and I really believe in the song and what it says. It has got a different edge. I love the song."

== Critical reception ==
Billy Dukes of Taste of Country gave the song three and a half stars out of five, calling it "the safe choice for the follow-up to 'Take a Back Road' because it goes back to the formula that made Atkins a star three years ago." Matt Bjorke of Roughstock gave the song three stars out of five, writing that it has "an easy to digest melody" and "Rodney sings the melody well" but "it's not as immediately likable or memorable as 'Take a Back Road.'"

== Music video ==
The music video was directed by Ry Cox and premiered in May 2012.

== Chart performance ==
"He's Mine" debuted at number 57 on the U.S. Billboard Hot Country Songs chart for the week of November 19, 2011.

Chart (2011–2012)	Peak position
Canada Country (Billboard)	49
US Hot Country Songs (Billboard)	23
US Billboard Bubbling Under Hot 100	3

=== Year-end charts ===
Chart (2012)	Position
US Country Songs (Billboard)	93

== Certifications ==
Certifications for Rodney Atkins's version of "He's Mine"
Region	Certification	Certified units/sales
United States (RIAA)	Platinum	1,000,000^{‡}
^{‡} Sales+streaming figures based on certification alone.
