= Doing It Wrong =

Doing It Wrong may refer to:

- "Doing It Wrong", a song from the album Take Care by Drake
- "Doing It Wrong", the theme song of the TV series Some Girls, sung by Anita Blay (CocknBullKid)
- Doing It Wrong (DIW), in scuba-diving, failure to comply with the principles of Doing It Right (DIR), from the point of view of exponents of DIR

== See also ==
- "Maybe I'm Doing It Wrong", a track from the album Sail Away by Randy Newman
- Doing It Right (disambiguation)
