= Caught Up in the Country =

Studio album by Rodney Atkins
- Released: May 10, 2019
- Recorded: 2017–2019
- Studios: Curb Studio; (Nashville)
- Genre: Country
- Length: 40:40
- Label: Curb Records
- Producers: Ted Hewitt; Rodney Atkins; Blake Bollinger

Rodney Atkins chronology
| Take a Back Road (2011) | Caught Up in the Country (2019) | True South (2026) |

Singles from Caught Up in the Country
- 1. "Caught Up in the Country" Released: March 4, 2018; 2. "Thank God for You" Released: August 21, 2019

Caught Up in the Country is the fifth studio album by American country music artist Rodney Atkins. It was released on May 10, 2019 through Curb Records.

Caught Up in the Country was Atkins' first studio album since Take a Back Road nearly eight years earlier. The album features two duets with his wife Rose Falcon, as well as an appearance by the Fisk Jubilee Singers.

The album was produced by Ted Hewitt, Blake Bollinger and Atkins.

== Commercial performance ==
The album debuted at No. 28 on the Top Country Albums for the chart week of May 25, 2019 on its release. It has sold 5,500 copies in the United States as of July 2019.

The album's lead single, the title track, peaked at number 20 on the Hot Country Songs and number 21 on the Country Airplay. A second single, "Thank God for You", was released on August 21, 2019.

== Track listing ==
| No. | Title | Writer(s) | Length |
|---|---|---|---|
| 1. | "Burn Something" | Blake Bollinger, Jessie Jo Dillon, Josh Thompson | 3:23 |
| 2. | "Caught Up in the Country" (featuring Fisk Jubilee Singers) | Connie Harrington, Jordan Schmidt, Mike Walker | 2:40 |
| 3. | "Figure You Out (Riddle)" (featuring Rose Falcon) | Andrew Dorff, Casey Beathard, Monty Criswell | 3:58 |
| 4. | "Thank God for You" | Blake Chaffin, Jon McElroy, Logan Mize, Randy Montana | 3:34 |
| 5. | "So Good" | Rodney Atkins, Wil Nance | 2:56 |
| 6. | "What Lonely Looks Like" | Barry Dean, Luke Laird | 3:27 |
| 7. | "My Life" | Curt Gibbs, Atkins, Rose Falcon | 3:10 |
| 8. | "Cover Me Up" | Jason Isbell | 4:16 |
| 9. | "All My Friends Are Drunk" | Jimmy Yeary, Lee Thomas Miller, Criswell | 3:41 |
| 10. | "Young Man" | Atkins, Falcon, Matt Rogers | 3:13 |
| 11. | "Everybody's Got Something" (featuring Rose Falcon) | Harrington, Ben Glover, Jessi Alexander | 3:20 |
| 12. | "Waiting on a Good Day" | Atkins, Hewitt | 3:02 |
| Total length: | | | 40:40 |

== Personnel ==
Adapted from liner notes.

- Rodney Atkins - acoustic guitar, programming, lead vocals
- Blake Bollinger - keyboards, programming, background vocals
- Dave Cohen - keyboards
- David Dorn - keyboards
- Mark Evitts - fiddle, strings
- Rose Falcon - background vocals, duet vocals on "Figure You Out (Riddle)" and "Everybody's Got Something"
- Larry Franklin - fiddle
- Jason Gantt - electric guitar
- Vicki Hampton - background vocals
- Ted Hewitt - acoustic guitar, programming, background vocals
- Jim Hoke - harmonica
- Brandon Hood - acoustic guitar, electric guitar
- Evan Hutchings - drums
- Mike Johnson - steel guitar
- Kim Keyes - background vocals
- Troy Lancaster - electric guitar
- Chiara Liuzzi - sounds
- Tony Lucido - bass guitar
- Jerry McPherson - electric guitar
- Miles McPherson - drums
- Jimmy Nichols - keyboards
- Larry Paxton - bass guitar
- Gary Prim - keyboards
- Danny Rader - acoustic guitar
- Jeff Roach - keyboards
- Jimmie Lee Sloas - bass guitar
- Bobby Terry - acoustic guitar
- Ilya Toshinsky - acoustic guitar
- Adolfo La Volpe - electronics
- Clint Wells - acoustic guitar
- Lonnie Wilson - drums
- Jonathan Yudkin - fiddle

The Fisk Jubilee Singers on "Caught Up in the Country": Xavier Allison, Melody Beck, Crystal Brooks, Topin Brown, Allen Christian, Kearston Hatch, Anthony Kennedy, Jada Marshall, Dwayne Mitchell, Kiera Pryor, Lance Richards, Victoria Sanders, Javon Sease, Deonte Williams, Justen Williams-Reed

== Charts ==
Weekly chart performance for Caught Up in the Country
| Chart (2019) | Peak position |
|---|---|
| US Top Album Sales (Billboard) | 54 |
| US Top Country Albums (Billboard) | 28 |
