= Just Wanna Rock N' Roll =

Single by Rodney Atkins

from the album Take a Back Road
- Released: June 4, 2012
- Genre: Country
- Length: 3:55
- Label: Curb
- Songwriters: Rodney Clawson; Chris Tompkins
- Producers: Ted Hewitt; Rodney Atkins

Rodney Atkins singles chronology
"He's Mine" (2011)	"Just Wanna Rock N' Roll" (2012)	"Doin' It Right" (2013)

"Just Wanna Rock N' Roll" is a song written by Rodney Clawson and Chris Tompkins, and recorded by American country music artist Rodney Atkins. It was released in June 2012 as the third single from his album Take a Back Road. On the Hot Country Songs chart, the song peaked at No. 39. It also peaked at No. 31 on the Country Airplay chart.

== Content ==
This song is an uplifting cut that finds Atkins encouraging listeners not to get worried by life's troubles. "Rodney Clawson wrote that song. It's about your happy switch," said the singer to The Boot. "You choose to be happy, and in life we have as many good days as bad days. I try to find and record those songs that pull you through the bad days, and keep you believing that the good days are just around the corner. Sometimes it's just a matter of singing [Atkins sings] 'oh, oh, oh' when you feel that thing in your head, where you're stressed out or messed up. It's crazy, but it works. It carries you through some tough times. I see the crowd singing 'Rock 'N Roll' or 'Back Road' at my concerts ... they are anthems and they lift up your life."

== Critical reception ==
Billy Dukes of Taste of Country gave the song four stars out of five, writing that "the entire song works because it’s an honest reflection of who this singer is." Ashley Cooke of Roughstock gave the song three and a half stars out of five, saying that "the arrangement isn't that bad and a majority of the lyrics make sense ... until you get to the chorus." Ben Foster of Country Universe gave the song a C− grade, writing that it "seems to merit little description, except to put to rest any expectations of it defying expectations."

== Music video ==
The music video was directed in Todd Cassetty and premiered in August 2012.

== Chart performance ==
"Just Wanna Rock N' Roll" debuted at number 57 on the U.S. Billboard Hot Country Songs chart for the week of June 23, 2012.

Chart (2012)	Peak position
US Country Airplay (Billboard)	31
US Hot Country Songs (Billboard)	39
