= Jamie Lee Thurston =

American country music singer

- Born: Montpelier, Vermont, U.S.
- Origin: Nashville, Tennessee
- Genres: Country
- Occupation: Singer-songwriter
- Instrument(s): Vocals, guitar
- Years active: 2003–present
- Labels: View 2, Warner Bros., Country Thunder, Snakebit

Jamie Lee Thurston is an American country music singer. He was raised in Waterbury, Vermont and performed with his father starting at age 15. After moving to Los Angeles, California, he moved again to Nashville, Tennessee in 1999.

In 2003, he released the single "It Can All Be Gone" via View 2 Records, a single which peaked at number 59 on the Hot Country Songs charts. He later signed to Warner Bros. Records Nashville, then to Country Thunder.

Thurston wrote Rodney Atkins' 2009 single "15 Minutes", and cuts by Trace Adkins and Montgomery Gentry. In 2013, Thurston appeared on Game Show Network's Family Trade to compose a jingle for G. Stone Motors in exchange for a new truck. The jingle, "We Trade for Anything" was also used as the show's opening credits theme music.

Thurston's life is the basis of a screenplay co-written by Tim Rhys, the founder of MovieMaker magazine.

== Discography ==
=== Albums ===
Title	Album details
I Just Wanna Do My Thing	Release date: 2009; Label: CD Baby; Format: CD
Where's an Outlaw When You Need One	Release date: 2010; Label: Snakebit; Format: CD
The Stayin Kind	Release date: 2012; Label: CD Baby; Format: CD

=== Singles ===
Year	Single	Peak chart positions	Album
Year	Single	US Country	Album
2003	"It Can All Be Gone"	59	I Just Wanna Do My Thing
2006	"God Bless the Children" (with Wayne Warner and the Nashville All-Star Choir)	—	Turbo Twang'n
2007	"People Out There"	—	I Just Wanna Do My Thing
2007	"Dear God"	—	I Just Wanna Do My Thing
"—" denotes releases that did not chart

=== Music videos ===
Year	Video
2003	"It Can All Be Gone"
2009	"Dance Around The Truth"
2017	"Givin' Up Breathin'"
