= Family Trade =

2013 reality television series

- Genre: Reality television
- Starring: Gardner Stone; Todd Stone; Darcy Stone; Travis Romano
- Theme music composer: Jamie Lee Thurston
- Opening theme: "We Trade for Anything"
- Country of origin: United States
- Original language: English
- No. of seasons: 1
- No. of episodes: 8

Production
- Executive producers: Eli Frankel; Alex Rader
- Producer: Paul Sutera
- Production location: Middlebury, Vermont
- Editor: Damien LeVeck
- Running time: 20–21 minutes
- Production companies: Lionsgate Television; Rogue Atlas Productions

Original release
- Network: Game Show Network
- Release: March 12 – April 16, 2013

Family Trade is an American reality television series broadcast by Game Show Network (GSN). The show premiered on March 12, 2013; its eighth and final episode aired on April 16, 2013. Filmed in Middlebury, Vermont, the series chronicles the daily activities of G. Stone Motors, a GMC and Ford car dealership that employs the barter system in selling its automobiles. The business is operated by its founder, Gardner Stone, his son and daughter, Todd and Darcy, and General Manager Travis Romano. The series features the shop's daily interaction with its customers, who bring in a variety of items that can be resold in order to receive a down payment on the vehicle they are leasing or purchasing. Commentary and narration are provided by the Stone family and Romano during the episodes.

Family Trade was a part of GSN's intent to broaden their programming landscape since the network had historically aired traditional game shows in most of its programming. The series was given unfavorable reviews by critics, and its television ratings fell over time, losing almost half of its audience between the series premiere and finale.

== Format ==
The series depicts interactions and negotiations between customers and staff at G. Stone Motors, a car dealership in Middlebury, Vermont that allows its customers to bring in anything they believe is resalable (including pigs, maple syrup, and collectible dolls) to the dealership to help cover the cost of a new or used vehicle rather than paying for it with cash. Gardner Stone, founder and owner of the dealership, explains, "I feel everything is worth something. Lots of times you'll get into the middle of a deal and the customer won't be able to go any further. So we always ask them, 'What else you got that you're not using?'" His son Todd also claims that the barter system creates deals that would otherwise not be possible: "It's helped us get some deals that we wouldn't have gotten, and most of the time we do make good money. Even if we break even, we still sold the automobile, and we made money on that."

The customers negotiate the value of their items, usually with Gardner, but occasionally also with other members of the shop's staff. The trade usually is not enough to cover the full value of the car or truck, because of this, the value of the trade provides the customers with a down payment on the vehicle. Once the trade is completed, Gardner's son and daughter, Todd and Darcy, work with Travis to resell the items they have acquired, which is where the dealership either earns an additional profit or loses some of their earnings.

== Cast ==
- Gardner Stone – President and founder of G. Stone Motors. Born and raised in Middlebury, Stone started the company in 1974 before moving it to its current location in 1983. He is a staunch supporter of American-manufactured cars.
- Todd Stone – Gardner's son and the dealership's Vice President. Stone began working at G. Stone Motors in 1985 by washing cars while he was still in school. Stone often has the task of reselling the items the shop takes in trade. He and Gardner often disagree on what makes a good trade, which can lead to minor conflicts between the two. Stone also competes for his family's racing team, G. Stone Motorsports, in NASCAR's Whelen All-American Series, winning the series' national Rookie of the Year award in 2013.
- Darcy Stone – Gardner's daughter and General Manager of G. Stone Commercial Group, who also works as a service coordinator. Stone occasionally is involved in helping Gardner take in items customers have to trade, and is often seen helping to resell those items.
- Travis Romano – The dealership's General Manager, who began working at the shop in 2002 as a sales consultant. Romano oversees many of the business's daily operations by working with both the sales and finance departments of the shop, and also sometimes works with Todd on reselling many of the shop's acquired items.

== Production ==
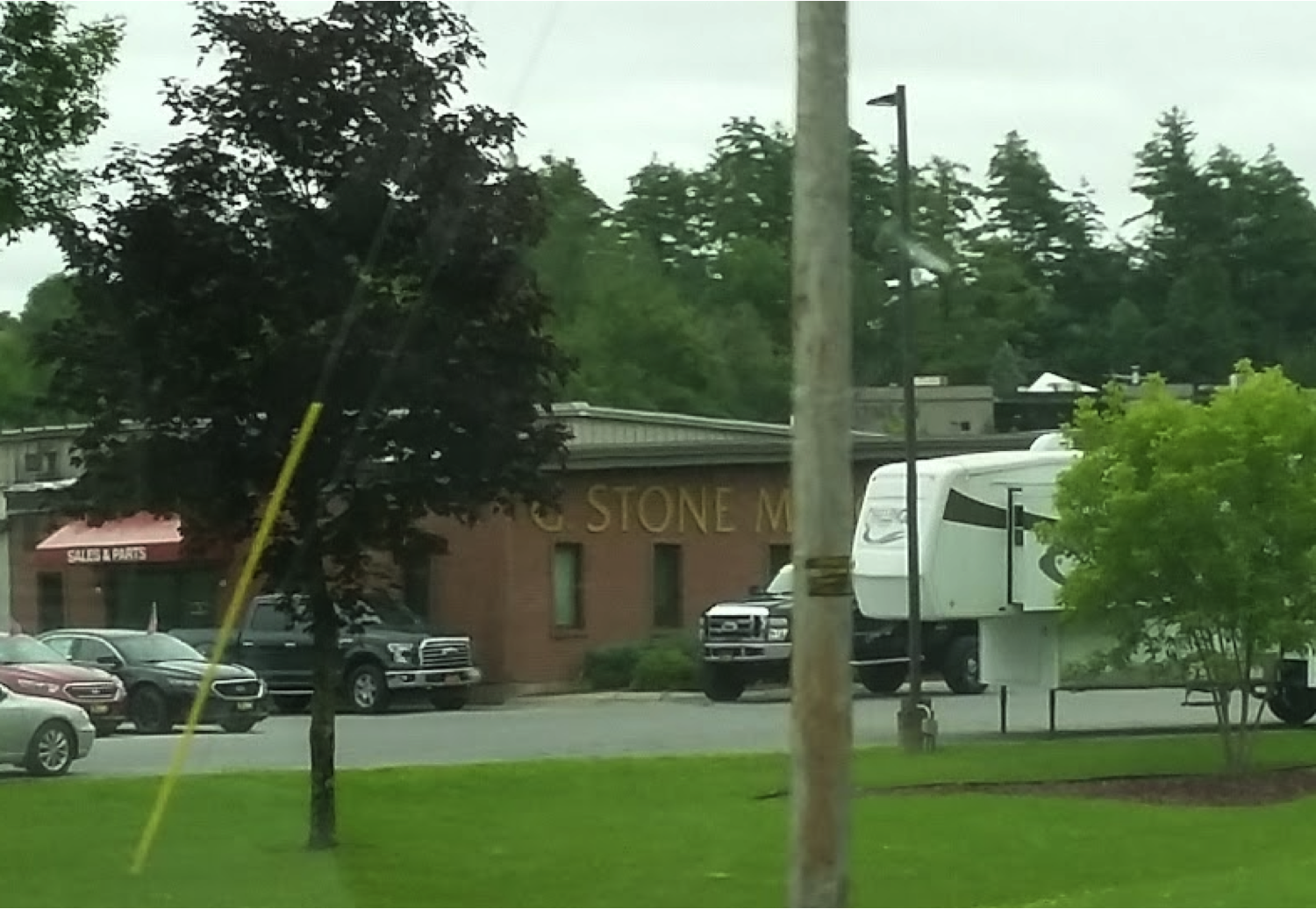
A view of the dealership from its location on U.S. Route 7 in Vermont

Production for Family Trade began when Lionsgate executive Eli Frankel approached the dealership in early 2011 proposing the idea of filming a reality show. Frankel was intrigued when he learned of the dealership's trade policy: "No one barters like what Stone does much anymore. This is a very unique place." The Stones initially thought the pitch was a hoax, though once they recognized the validity of the offer, Gardner agreed to do the show provided the deals aired were truly representative of how the business operates. Before the show premiered, Gardner made this desire clear, saying, "I'm very adamant about making this a legitimate thing. I can't stand these reality shows that you just know aren't right. We don't know where any of the deals are going to go prior to negotiating on the air." Todd echoed his father's desire, remarking, "He made a big point of making this a real show, not a fake show." The Stones eventually agreed to have Lionsgate film a fifteen-minute clip of various trades performed at the dealership. Lionsgate pitched the idea to a few networks, such as History, but Game Show Network (GSN) eventually picked the series up after ordering a pilot episode. David Schiff, GSN's senior vice president for programming and development, expressed excitement at the prospect of working with the Stone family: "Gardner is a great businessman, and he really goes by his gut. The variety of things that come in that door are so unique and so interesting and so much fun."

In the network's 2012 upfronts, GSN announced plans to launch a new category of programming entitled "Real-Life Games," which would include series that "take place in real-world settings and feature real-life risk and reward, winners and losers, joy and disappointment." Family Trade first appeared in the network's upfronts on March 21, 2012, as a half-hour reality show under the new category, then under the title The Family Trade. Despite this, the Stones insisted that there were no "game" aspects of the series, rather that everything seen on the show was related to business. After three test audiences gave positive reviews of the pilot, GSN proceeded to order eight episodes of the series on August 9, 2012. Filming for the eight episodes, which began September 1, 2012, lasted for around five or six weeks. The series was originally expected to premiere on March 5, 2013. On February 1, 2013, GSN pushed the premiere date back a week to March 12, 2013 (a specific reason was not given). Although the network never made an official cancelation announcement, the show has not aired on GSN since the end of the first season and is thus presumed to have been canceled.

== Episodes ==
No.	Title	Original release date	US viewers (millions)
1	"Episode 1"	March 12, 2013	0.388
Trades featured include thirty gallons of maple syrup and six pigs.
2	"Episode 2"	March 12, 2013	0.418
Trades featured include dolls, an antique tractor, and various items from a pawn shop.
3	"Episode 3"	March 19, 2013	0.242
Trades featured include sheep, pigs, and a hot air balloon, while an item previously taken in trade is destroyed via explosives.
4	"Episode 4"	March 19, 2013	0.183
Trades featured include six antique kiddie rides and a bridge.
5	"Episode 5"	March 26, 2013	0.249
Trades featured include spa certificates and an antique post office front.
6	"Episode 6"	April 2, 2013	0.222
Trades featured include cheese and factory carts modified to serve as coffee tables.
7	"Episode 7"	April 9, 2013	0.277
Trades featured include a box of tattoo equipment and Adirondack chairs made primarily from skis. While trading the tattoo equipment, Todd decides to get a tattoo of the G. Stone Motors emblem on his arm.
8	"Episode 8"	April 16, 2013	0.213
Country music artist Jamie Lee Thurston writes a jingle for the dealership (which is used as the show's theme song) in exchange for a new truck. Other trades featured include two horses and a donkey, as well as a wedding dress.

== Reception ==
Greg Braxton of the Los Angeles Times considered Family Trade to be a "game-changer" for GSN due to the network's history of primarily airing game shows. Braxton also called the show a "key part in [GSN's] strategy to broaden its programming and brand." The day after the series premiere, Michael Tyminski of Manhattan Digest gave a negative review of the show, calling it "incredibly bland," and stating that it appeared to lack much of the family drama that had previously been advertised. Writing for the Star Tribune, Neal Justin added, "The toughest sell of all [is] convincing me to watch more than one episode."

=== Ratings ===
The series started off with decent television ratings by GSN's standards, averaging 403,000 viewers for the two episodes shown on the night of the show's premiere, slightly above the network's primetime viewership average. The show quickly fell in the ratings, with all new episodes airing in the first quarter averaging 296,000 viewers, and only 40,000 viewers (with a 0.0 rating) among adults 18–49. When averaged as a whole, the series dropped even lower in terms of total viewers, with an average of 274,000, and only improved by a negligible amount among adults 18–49, with 46,000 viewers (again with a 0.0 rating).
