= Blake & Brian =

- Origin: Nashville, Tennessee, U.S.
- Genres: Country
- Years active: 1995–1999
- Labels: Curb
- Past members: Brian Gowan; Blake Weldon

Blake & Brian was an American country music duo composed of singer-songwriters Brian Gowan (born January 7, 1969, in Temple, Texas) and Blake Weldon (September 13, 1966, in Lufkin, Texas).

The two were paired up by record producer Chuck Howard in 1995. Their self-titled debut album was issued in 1997 on the Curb Records label. The album's lead-off single, "Another Perfect Day", peaked at No. 45 on the Billboard country charts. Country Standard Time gave the album a mixed review, stating that although Gowan and Weldon were "indistinguishable vocally and equally malleable", and although some of the songs were derivative of the Eagles, the more up-tempo tracks were "punch[ed] up... with timeless Texas kick". After releasing this album, they charted two more singles ("The Wish" and "Amnesia"), the latter of which was not included on an album. By 1999, Blake & Brian had parted ways. Gowan released a solo album entitled Warm Spanish Wine in 2000. He also co-wrote Rodney Atkins' 1997 debut single "In a Heartbeat" and three songs on Atkins' 2003 debut album Honesty.

== Discography ==
=== Blake & Brian (1997) ===
Blake & Brian

Studio album by Blake & Brian
- Released: August 19, 1997
- Genre: Country
- Label: Curb
- Producer: Chuck Howard

==== Track listing ====
1. "If Guitars Were Guns" (Brian Gowan, Roger Alan Wade) – 2:21
2. "Why, Why, Why" (Mark Selby, Doug Hughes) – 2:33
3. "Saving My Love" (Blake Weldon, Tony Stampley) – 3:43
4. "The Wish" (Conley White, Sam Hogin, Phil Barnhart) – 3:44
5. "There Is No End" (Weldon, Bill Rice, Sharon Rice) – 3:29
6. "Straight to You" (Lee Satterfield, George Teren) – 2:44
7. "Another Perfect Day" (White, Barnhart, Brian Tabor) – 3:26
8. "Shut Up Heart" (Michael Huffman, Rick Williamson) – 2:27
9. "Confederate Rose" (Max T. Barnes, Leslie Satcher) – 3:34
10. "Don't Apologize for Who You Are" (Troy Seals, Waylon Jennings) – 2:12
  - feat. Waylon Jennings and Charlie Daniels
11. "My Only Claim to Fame" (Weldon, B. Rice, S. Rice) – 3:07

==== Personnel ====
As listed in liner notes.

- Eddie Bayers – drums
- Michael Black – background vocals
- Bruce Bouton – steel guitar
- Dennis Burnside – piano
- J.T. Corenflos – electric guitar
- Larry Franklin – fiddle
- Paul Franklin – steel guitar
- John Hobbs – piano
- David Hungate – bass guitar
- Brent Mason – electric guitar
- Terry McMillan – harmonica, percussion
- Scott Merry – bass guitar
- John Wesley Ryles – background vocals
- Paul Scholten – drums
- Michael Spriggs – acoustic guitar
- Dennis Wilson – background vocals
- Glenn Worf – bass guitar

=== Singles ===
Year	Single	Peak chart positions		Album
Year	Single	US Country	CAN Country	Album
1997	"Another Perfect Day"	45	87	Blake & Brian
1997	"The Wish"	62	—	Blake & Brian
1998	"Amnesia"	68	—	Single only
"—" denotes releases that did not chart

=== Music videos ===
Year	Video	Director
1997	"Another Perfect Day"	David Abbott
1998	"Amnesia"	David Abbott
