= Honesty (Rodney Atkins album) =

Studio album by Rodney Atkins
- Released: October 14, 2003
- Genre: Country
- Length: 42:02
- Label: Curb Records
- Producer: Rodney Atkins; Ted Hewitt

Rodney Atkins chronology
| Honesty (2003) | If You're Going Through Hell (2006) |

Singles from Honesty
- 1. "Sing Along" Released: May 18, 2002; 2. "My Old Man" Released: October 5, 2002; 3. "Honesty (Write Me a List)" Released: June 16, 2003; 4. "Someone to Share It With" Released: 2004; 5. "Monkey in the Middle" Released: 2004

Professional ratings
Review scores
| Source | Rating |
|---|---|
| About.com | 4/5 stars |
| Allmusic | 3/5 stars |
| Country Standard Time | (average) |
| Country Weekly | (positive) |

Honesty is the debut studio album by American country music artist Rodney Atkins. It was released on October 14, 2003 by Curb Records.

Honesty produced four chart singles on the Billboard Hot Country Singles & Tracks (now Hot Country Songs) charts with "Sing Along" (No. 36), "My Old Man" (No. 37), "Honesty (Write Me a List)" (No. 4), and "Someone to Share It With" (No. 41). The album's fifth single, "Monkey in the Middle", failed to chart. This song and two others on the album were co-written by Brian Gowan, who recorded on Curb in 1997 in the duo Blake & Brian.

== Track listing ==
| No. | Title | Writer(s) | Length |
|---|---|---|---|
| 1. | "Honesty (Write Me a List)" | Patience Clemens, David Kent | 4:15 |
| 2. | "What's Left of Me" | Bruce Gaitsch, Rodney Atkins | 2:51 |
| 3. | "Monkey in the Middle" | Ted Hewitt, Atkins, Brian Gowan | 3:34 |
| 4. | "Someone to Share It With" | Hewitt, Atkins, Gowan | 3:31 |
| 5. | "The Love We Make" | Brett James, Troy Verges | 3:12 |
| 6. | "The Man I Am Today" | Hewitt, Atkins | 3:42 |
| 7. | "Uncomplicated" | Troy Seals, Scotty Emerick | 3:16 |
| 8. | "Sing Along" | Gaitsch, Hewitt, Atkins | 3:00 |
| 9. | "Yeah She Does" | Hugh Murray, Keith Urban | 3:21 |
| 10. | "I Will Come to You" | Gaitsch, Hewitt, Atkins | 3:56 |
| 11. | "Forgiveness and Permission" | Hewitt, Atkins, Gowan | 3:26 |
| 12. | "My Old Man" | Hewitt, Atkins | 3:58 |

== Personnel ==
- Walt Aldridge- bouzouki
- Rodney Atkins- loop programming, lead vocals, background vocals
- Bekka Bramlett- background vocals
- Mike Brignardello- bass guitar
- Shannon Forrest- drums
- Bruce Gaitsch- bass guitar, acoustic guitar, electric guitar
- Sonny Garrish- steel guitar
- Mark Gillespie- acoustic guitar, gut string guitar, mandolin
- Ted Hewitt- acoustic guitar, electric guitar, loop programming, electric sitar, background vocals
- Wes Hightower- background vocals
- B. James Lowry- acoustic guitar, electric guitar
- Brent Mason- electric guitar
- Chris McHugh- drums, loop programming
- Gene Miller- background vocals
- Greg Morrow- drums
- Gordon Mote- Farfisa organ, keyboards
- Steve Nathan- keyboards, piano, Wurlitzer
- Justin Niebank- loop programming
- Kim Parent- background vocals
- Scotty Sanders- steel guitar, lap steel guitar
- Hank Singer- fiddle
- Russell Terrell- background vocals
- John Willis- acoustic guitar
- Lonnie Wilson- drums
- Jonathan Yudkin- bouzouki, fiddle, orchestra bells

== Chart performance ==
=== Album ===
| Chart (2003) | Peak position |
|---|---|
| U.S. Billboard Top Country Albums | 50 |
| U.S. Billboard Top Heatseekers | 47 |

=== Singles ===
| Year | Single | Peak chart positions | |
| Year | Single | US Country | US |
|---|---|---|---|
| 2002 | "Sing Along" | 37 | — |
| 2002 | "My Old Man" | 36 | — |
| 2003 | "Honesty (Write Me a List)" | 4 | 57 |
| 2004 | "Someone to Share It With" | 41 | — |
| 2004 | "Monkey in the Middle" | — | — |
"—" denotes releases that did not chart
