= 15 Minutes (Rodney Atkins song) =

Single by Rodney Atkins

from the album It's America
- Released: May 26, 2009
- Genre: Country
- Length: 2:39
- Label: Curb
- Songwriters: Tony Mullins; Jamie Lee Thurston
- Producers: Ted Hewitt; Rodney Atkins

Rodney Atkins singles chronology
"It's America" (2008)	"15 Minutes" (2009)	"Chasin' Girls" (2009)

"15 Minutes" is a song written by Tony Mullins and Jamie Lee Thurston and recorded by American country music singer Rodney Atkins. It was released in May 2009 as the second single from Atkin's 2009 album It's America.

== Content ==
The narrator talks about quitting smoking, drinking, and women. He states "it was the worst 15 minutes of [his] life", and shows that he couldn't last long without them.

== Critical reception ==
Pierce Greenberg of Engine 145 viewed the song favorably, comparing it to Kevin Fowler's and Brad Paisley's styles and saying, "Likely to be a crowd favorite, it's a song that shows the same kind of thoughtful, clever hook that those artists have built careers around." Todd Sterling of Allmusic called it a "honky tonk mashup" and said that it had "a ton of heart" even if it was "calculated".

== Chart performance ==
Chart (2009)	Peak position
Canada Country (Billboard)	38
US Hot Country Songs (Billboard)	20
US Billboard Bubbling Under Hot 100 Singles	15
