= It's America (song) =

Single by Rodney Atkins

from the album It's America
- Released: November 24, 2008
- Recorded: 2008
- Genre: Country
- Length: 3:29
- Label: Curb
- Songwriters: Brett James; Angelo Petraglia
- Producers: Ted Hewitt; Rodney Atkins

Rodney Atkins singles chronology
"Invisibly Shaken" (2008)	"It's America" (2008)	"15 Minutes" (2009)

"It's America" is a song written by Brett James and Angelo Petraglia and recorded by American country music singer Rodney Atkins. It was released in November 2008 as the first single and title track from Atkin's 2009 album of the same name.

== Content ==
"It's America" is an up-tempo, backed by banjo, in which the narrator lists off various American images before saying that he is proud to live in the United States. The first verse describes his stopping at a lemonade stand and considering the stand a "picture-perfect postcard", while in the second verse, he describes watching a news story about people voluntary gathering to rebuild their community after a tornado.

== Critical reception ==
Matt Bjorke of Roughstock gave the song a mixed review. Bjorke called it "a song that aims to reaffirm what made Rodney Atkins a star". He added that although the message was good, the song's production did not fit Atkins' voice and detracted from the lyric. Jim Malec of The 9513 gave it a "thumbs down" rating. His review criticizes the use of the word "it", asking, "What is the 'it' that supposedly represents this nation of millions?" Malec also said, " But 'It’s America' pretends that the images it presents as fundamental exist in isolation, which simply isn’t true. And it makes no attempt to discuss why those images are personally relevant[…] 'It’s America' is a symbol not a song, an advertisement not art."

== Chart performance ==
"It's America" debuted at #57 on the Hot Country Songs chart dated November 29, 2008, and entered the Top 40 in its third chart week. The song became his fifth Number One on the chart dated May 2, 2009.

Weekly chart performance
Chart (2008–2009)	Peak position
US Billboard Hot 100	44
US Hot Country Songs (Billboard)	1

=== Year-end charts ===
Annual chart rankings
Chart (2009)	Position
US Country Songs (Billboard)	17
US Radio Songs (Billboard)	67

== Certifications ==
Region	Certification	Certified units/sales
United States (RIAA)	Gold	500,000^{‡}
^{‡} Sales+streaming figures based on certification alone.
