= Take a Back Road (song) =

Single by Rodney Atkins

from the album Take a Back Road
- Released: April 25, 2011
- Genre: Country
- Length: 3:29
- Label: Curb
- Songwriters: Rhett Akins; Luke Laird
- Producers: Ted Hewitt; Rodney Atkins

Rodney Atkins singles chronology
"Farmer's Daughter" (2010)	"Take a Back Road" (2011)	"He's Mine" (2011)

"Take a Back Road" is a song written by Rhett Akins and Luke Laird and recorded by American country music singer Rodney Atkins. It was released in April 2011 as the first single and title track from Atkin's album of the same name. The song reached number one the US Billboard Hot Country Songs chart in October 2011. It was his final number one on that chart to date. The song also peaked at number 23 on the US Billboard Hot 100.

== Background and writing ==
Co-writer Rhett Akins came up with the song's title after hearing a friend say that listening to a Hank Williams Jr. album made him "want to ride a dirt road right now." Laird came up with a drum loop to which he could not think of any lyrics, and Akins recommended the hook. The two of them changed the line to "take a back road" and decided to give it a rhythmic phrasing.

== Content ==
The song is about a man who is stuck in a traffic jam on a freeway. He then hears a George Strait song from 1982 and it makes him want to drive down a country road.

== Critical reception ==
Giving it four stars out of five, Matt Bjorke of Roughstock called it "the perfect song to listen to when feeling like 'escaping' the pressures of the world for a few minutes". Kevin John Coyne, reviewing the song for Country Universe, gave it a C+ grade, saying that "everyone already knew what the song was going to be about" and that he gave it a "bonus + for rhyming gravel with travel." Steve Leggett of Allmusic called it "one of the summer’s most memorable singles (complete with a George Strait namecheck)."

== Music video ==
The music video was directed by Andy Tennant and premiered in September 2011. It was filmed on Interstate 65 near Nashville, Tennessee and in Carthage, Tennessee.

== Chart performance ==
=== Weekly charts ===
Chart (2011)	Peak position
Canada Country (Billboard)	1
Canada Hot 100 (Billboard)	48
US Hot Country Songs (Billboard)	1
US Billboard Hot 100	23

=== Year-end charts ===
Chart (2011)	Position
US Country Songs (Billboard)	3
US Billboard Hot 100	90

=== Decade-end charts ===
Chart (2010–2019)	Position
US Hot Country Songs (Billboard)	25

== Certifications ==
Region	Certification	Certified units/sales
United States (RIAA)	3× Platinum	3,000,000^{‡}
^{‡} Sales+streaming figures based on certification alone.
