= Farmer's Daughter (Rodney Atkins song) =

Single by Rodney Atkins

from the album It's America and Take a Back Road
- Released: March 29, 2010
- Genre: Country
- Length: 3:24 (radio version)
- Label: Curb
- Songwriters: Marv Green; Rhett Akins; Ben Hayslip
- Producers: Ted Hewitt; Rodney Atkins

Rodney Atkins singles chronology
"Chasin' Girls" (2009)	"Farmer's Daughter" (2010)	"Take a Back Road" (2011)

"Farmer's Daughter" is a song written by Marv Green, Rhett Akins, and Ben Hayslip and recorded by American country music artist Rodney Atkins. It was released in March 2010 as the fourth single from Atkins' album It's America, available in June 2010 as a bonus track from the album's re-issue. The song is also included as an album cut on his 2011 album Take a Back Road.

== Background and writing ==
"This was the first time the three of us had ever gotten together to write," co-writer Rhett Akins told The Boot. "Marv came in with the idea. All he really had was the hook of the song: 'Just when I thought it couldn't get no hotter / I caught a glimpse of the farmer's daughter.' Ben and I jumped all over it. We thought it was awesome."

Atkins first heard “Farmer’s Daughter” when Curb Records A&R consultant Kelly Lynn played the song for him. Atkins then asked his wife, Tammy, to listen to it, and she encouraged him to record it. Atkins said that the label initially did not plan to release a new single until the summer of 2010, but decided to release “Farmer’s Daughter” earlier after hearing the recording.

Atkins later described “Farmer’s Daughter” as unusual because its choruses are not identical, noting that this departed from conventional songwriting structure. He compared the approach to George Strait’s “The Chair”, which does not have a chorus.

== Music video ==
The music video was directed by Chris Hicky and premiered on June 16, 2010.

The video was filmed in rural Franklin, Tennessee, and features Atkins driving a tractor and bucking hay. Atkins’ wife, Tammy Jo, portrays the farmer’s daughter whom his character eventually marries.

== Chart performance ==
"Farmer's Daughter" debuted at number 96 on the U.S. Billboard Hot 100 chart for the week of July 10, 2010.

Chart (2010)	Peak position
Canada Country (Billboard)	25
US Billboard Hot 100	47
US Hot Country Songs (Billboard)	5

=== Year-end charts ===
Chart (2010)	Position
US Country Songs (Billboard)	20

Chart (2011)	Position
US Country Songs (Billboard)	97

== Certifications ==
Region	Certification	Certified units/sales
United States (RIAA)	3× Platinum	3,000,000^{‡}
^{‡} Sales+streaming figures based on certification alone.
