= If You're Going Through Hell =

Studio album by Rodney Atkins
- Released: July 18, 2006
- Studio: Curb Studio (Nashville); Cartee Day Studio (Nashville); Country Q (Nashville); The Bonus Room (Old Hickory); Ridgetop Studio (Baxter)
- Genre: Country
- Length: 36:04
- Label: Curb Records
- Producer: Ted Hewitt; Rodney Atkins

Rodney Atkins chronology
Honesty (2003)	If You're Going Through Hell (2006)	It's America (2009)

Singles from If You're Going Through Hell
- 1. "If You're Going Through Hell (Before the Devil Even Knows)" Released: January 9, 2006; 2. "Watching You" Released: September 18, 2006; 3. "These Are My People" Released: March 19, 2007; 4. "Cleaning This Gun (Come On In Boy)" Released: October 1, 2007; 5. "Invisibly Shaken" Released: April 21, 2008

Professional ratings
Review scores
Source	Rating
About.com	4/5 stars
Allmusic	3.5/5 stars
Country Standard Time	(positive)
Plugged In	(positive)
Robert Christgau	(choice cut)
USA Today	3/4 stars

If You're Going Through Hell is the second studio album by American country music artist Rodney Atkins. It was released on July 18, 2006 by Curb Records. The album was certified platinum by the Recording Industry Association of America (RIAA) after selling at least one million copies in the United States.

The album's first four singles — "If You're Going Through Hell (Before the Devil Even Knows)", "Watching You", "These Are My People" and "Cleaning This Gun (Come On In Boy)" — all reached number one on the U.S. Billboard Hot Country Songs chart between 2006 and 2008. In addition, "If You're Going Through Hell (Before the Devil Even Knows" and "Watching You" were declared by Billboard as the Number One country songs of 2006 and 2007, respectively. The song "Invisibly Shaken" was originally recorded by Lee Greenwood on his 2003 album Stronger Than Time. Atkins' version of that song was released as the album's fifth and final single in early 2008 and peaked at No. 41.

== Track listing ==
No.	Title	Writer(s)	Length
1.	"These Are My People"	Rivers Rutherford, Dave Berg	3:34
2.	"About the South"	Rodney Atkins, Tom Hambridge, Shane Minor	2:58
3.	"Watching You"	Atkins, Steve Dean, Brian Gene White	3:55
4.	"Cleaning This Gun (Come On In Boy)"	Casey Beathard, Marla Cannon-Goodman	3:46
5.	"In the Middle"	Atkins, Berg, Sam Tate, Annie Tate	3:11
6.	"A Man on a Tractor"	Kent Agee, Michael Lunn	4:08
7.	"Wasted Whiskey"	Atkins, Ted Hewitt, Danny Simpson	3:42
8.	"Invisibly Shaken"	Atkins, Billy Kirsch	3:46
9.	"Angel's Hands"	Atkins, Nicole Witt, Bobby Tomberlin	3:29
10.	"If You're Going Through Hell (Before the Devil Even Knows)"	A. Tate, S. Tate, Berg	3:36

== Chart performance ==
=== Weekly charts ===
Chart (2006)	Peak position
US Billboard 200	3
US Top Country Albums (Billboard)	1

=== Year-end charts ===
Chart (2006)	Position
US Billboard 200	196
US Top Country Albums (Billboard)	38

Chart (2007)	Position
US Billboard 200	58
US Top Country Albums (Billboard)	10

Chart (2008)	Position
US Billboard 200	167
US Top Country Albums (Billboard)	27

=== Singles ===
Year	Single	Peak chart positions			
Year	Single	US Country	US	US Pop	CAN
2006	"If You're Going Through Hell (Before the Devil Even Knows)"	1	33	57	—
2006	"Watching You"	1	36	57	—
2007	"These Are My People"	1	42	96	—
2007	"Cleaning This Gun (Come On In Boy)"	1	40	83	84
2008	"Invisibly Shaken"	41	—	—	—
"—" denotes releases that did not chart

== Certifications ==
Region	Certification	Certified units/sales
United States (RIAA)	2× Platinum	2,000,000^{‡}
^{‡} Sales+streaming figures based on certification alone.

== Personnel ==
From If You're Going Through Hell liner notes.

Musicians

- Mike Brignardello - bass guitar
- Jim "Moose" Brown - piano
- Skip Cleavinger - Uilleann pipes
- Larry Franklin - fiddle, mandolin
- Rob Hajacos - fiddle
- Ted Hewitt - electric guitar, acoustic guitar, background vocals
- Angela Hurt - background vocals
- Mike Johnson - pedal steel guitar, lap steel guitar
- Julian King - percussion
- Troy Lancaster - electric guitar
- B. James Lowry - acoustic guitar
- Brent Mason - electric guitar
- Gordon Mote - piano, Hammond organ
- Larry Paxton - bass guitar
- Gary Prim - piano, Hammond organ
- Scotty Sanders - pedal steel guitar
- Steve Sheehan - acoustic guitar
- Wanda Vick - banjo
- John Willis - acoustic guitar, banjo
- Lonnie Wilson - drums

Crowd noise: Aaron Bowlin, Justin Luffman, Jenn Poppe, Kathryn Vieira, Steven Sheehan, Tammy Jo Atkins, Natalie Stout, "GiGi", Karla Hewitt, Angela Hurt, "Angela Hurt's mom", Clayton Bozeman, Kevin Rapillo, Sandi Harrison, James and Tecia Hedden, Lindsey Herren, Danielle Chaffin, Rhonda Chaffin, Doug Barnard, Colin Campbell, Belinda Smith, Marianne Mashburne, Terje Bratsveen, Charlie and Nicole Miralez, Jenny Tackett, Shawn and Kelly Pody

Technical

- Rodney Atkins - producer, engineering
- Billy Decker - mixing
- Tony Green - recording
- Ted Hewitt - producer, engineering
- P.T. Houston - recording
- Julian King - mixing
- Craig White - recording
- Hank Williams - mastering
