= Honesty (Write Me a List) =

"Honesty (Write Me A List)"

Single by Rodney Atkins

from the album Honesty
- B-side: "My Old Man"
- Released: June 9, 2003
- Genre: Country
- Length: 4:15
- Label: Curb
- Songwriters: Patience Clemens; David Kent
- Producers: Rodney Atkins; Ted Hewitt

Rodney Atkins singles chronology
"My Old Man" (2003)	"Honesty (Write Me A List)" (2003)	"Someone to Share It With" (2004)

"Honesty (Write Me a List)" is a song written by Patience Clemens and David Kent and recorded by American country music artist Rodney Atkins. It was released in June 2003 as the third single from Atkins' 2003 album Honesty. The song became Atkins' first Top 10 hit on the US Billboard Hot Country Singles & Tracks (now Hot Country Songs) chart at number 4. It also reached number 57 on the Billboard Hot 100.

== Background and writing ==
According to an interview, the events of the song were based on true events that happened during co-writer Patience Clemens' separation. She co-wrote it with David Kent, a friend of Atkins who told him about the song.

== Content ==
The song is a mid-tempo ballad mostly accompanied by piano. It centralizes around a couple who is about to divorce. In the beginning of the song, they are at a restaurant and the man asks the woman to write down a list of what she wants (in other words, the physical belongings owned by the couple). Instead of listing objects, however, she writes down what she wants from the man: "honesty, sincerity, tenderness and trust."

== Music video ==
The music video begins with a couple putting souvenirs away in a box, with the wife crying. The husband then goes to put the box away. The scene switches to Atkins singing in a park, standing beside an old pickup truck. The wife is seen watching the couple's wedding on tape. The husband and wife are then seen on TV, playing in a grass field.

The second verse features Atkins singing in a movie theater beside the screen showing the couple, and the wife placing a napkin in her husband's hand. The husband gives her a ring, but the wife leaves the room afterwards. The husband is then seen putting more souvenirs in a box. He is then sitting on a staircase, opening up the napkin his wife gave him, and finds the words, "Honesty, Sincerity, Tenderness, Trust" written on it. The husband kisses his wife while giving her a makeover. The wife is still watching the tape, as her husband gets off the staircase and takes the napkin with him.

The husband fights back tears and looks in his wife's eyes while putting the box of souvenirs away. Later, he leaves with the new car, while his wife is still in bed, crying.

== Chart performance ==
The song debuted at number 60 on the U.S. Billboard Hot Country Singles & Tracks for the week of June 21, 2003. It spent 33 weeks on the Hot Country Singles & Tracks chart, reaching its peak of number 4 in its 29th chart week on the week of January 3, 2004. It also peaked at number 57 on the Billboard Hot 100.

Chart (2003–2004)	Peak position
US Billboard Hot 100	57
US Hot Country Songs (Billboard)	4
