= Take a Back Road =

Studio album by Rodney Atkins
- Released: October 4, 2011
- Genre: Country
- Length: 46:02
- Label: Curb Records
- Producers: Ted Hewitt; Rodney Atkins

Rodney Atkins chronology
It's America (2009)	Take a Back Road (2011)	Greatest Hits (2015)

Singles from Take a Back Road
- 1. "Take a Back Road" Released: April 25, 2011; 2. "He's Mine" Released: November 7, 2011; 3. "Just Wanna Rock N' Roll" Released: June 4, 2012

Professional ratings
Review scores
Source	Rating
Entertainment Weekly	B
Roughstock	4/5 stars
USA Today	3/4 stars
The Washington Post	(average)

Take a Back Road is the fourth studio album by American country music artist Rodney Atkins. It was released on October 4, 2011, by Curb Records. The album's first single, its title track", is the fastest-rising and sixth number one hit of Atkins' career. The second single, "He's Mine," was previously recorded by Billy Ray Cyrus on his 2009 album Back to Tennessee. "Just Wanna Rock N' Roll" was released as the album's third single in June 2012.

== Track listing ==
No.	Title	Writer(s)	Length
1.	"Take a Back Road"	Rhett Akins, Luke Laird	3:29
2.	"He's Mine"	Casey Beathard, Tim James, Phil O'Donnell	3:11
3.	"Family"	Jim Collins, George Teren	3:23
4.	"The Corner"	Dean Dillon, Jessie Jo Dillon, Dale Dodson	3:39
5.	"She's a Girl"	Tony Martin, Neil Thrasher, Wendell Mobley	3:22
6.	"She'd Rather Fight"	Martin, Tom Shapiro, David Lee Murphy	3:07
7.	"Feet"	Tony Haselden, Walker Hayes	3:33
8.	"Cabin in the Woods"	Murphy, Collins	3:48
9.	"Just Wanna Rock N' Roll"	Rodney Clawson, Chris Tompkins	3:55
10.	"Growing Up Like That"	Rodney Atkins, Tim Hewitt, Ben Hayslip	4:00
11.	"Tips"	Atkins, Hewitt, Bob Regan	3:43
12.	"Lifelines"	Atkins, Hewitt, Hayslip	3:28
13.	"Farmer's Daughter"	Marv Green, Akins, Hayslip	3:24

== Personnel ==
- Rodney Atkins - lead vocals
- Liam Bailey - banjo
- Ashley Cleveland - background vocals
- Mike Doucette - harmonica
- Larry Franklin - fiddle, mandolin
- Vicki Hampton - background vocals
- Ted Hewitt - acoustic guitar, electric guitar, percussion, background vocals
- Angela Hurt - background vocals
- Mike Johnson - steel guitar
- Kim Keyes - background vocals
- Troy Lancaster - electric guitar
- Tim Lauer - keyboards
- Brent Mason - electric guitar
- Gordon Mote - keyboards
- Larry Paxton - bass guitar
- Jack Pearson - slide guitar
- Mark Prentice - bass guitar
- Gary Prim - keyboards
- Scotty Sanders - steel guitar
- Bryan Sutton - banjo, acoustic guitar, mandolin
- Ilya Toshinsky - banjo, acoustic guitar, mandolin
- Lonnie Wilson - drums, percussion

== Charts ==
=== Weekly charts ===
Chart (2011)	Peak position
US Billboard 200	8
US Top Country Albums (Billboard)	3

=== Year-end charts ===
Chart (2011)	Position
US Top Country Albums (Billboard)	66
Chart (2012)	Position
US Top Country Albums (Billboard)	40

=== Singles ===
Year	Single	Peak chart positions			
Year	Single	US Country	US Country Airplay	US	CAN
2011	"Take a Back Road"	1	—	23	48
2011	"He's Mine"^{A}	23	—	103	—
2012	"Just Wanna Rock N' Roll"	39	31	—	—
"—" denotes releases that did not chart

- ^{A}Did not enter the Hot 100, but peaked on Bubbling Under Hot 100 Singles.

== Certifications ==
Region	Certification	Certified units/sales
United States (RIAA)	Platinum	1,000,000^{‡}
^{‡} Sales+streaming figures based on certification alone.
