= Rivers Rutherford =

American country music songwriter (born 1967)

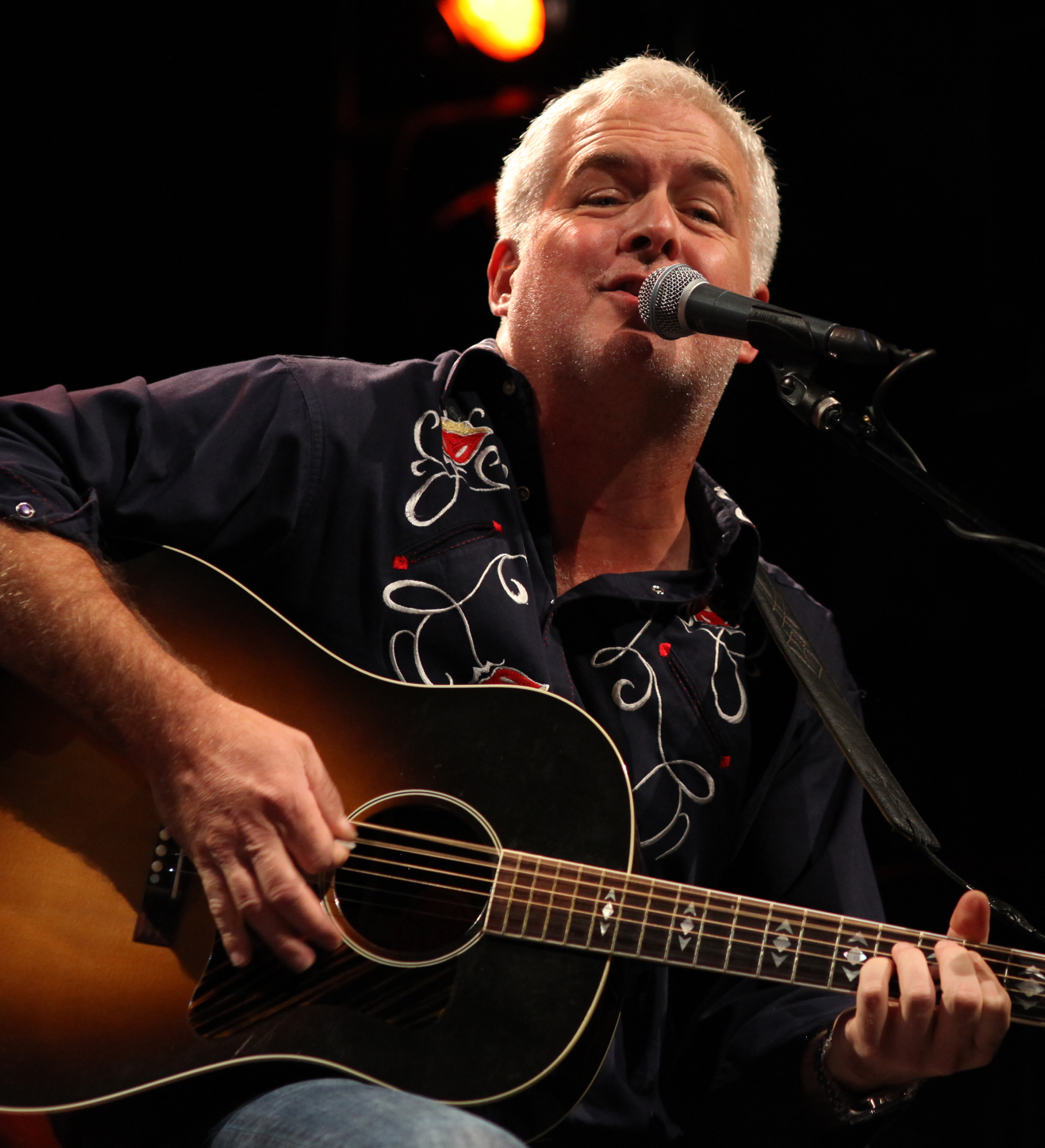
- Rutherford performing at the CMA Songwriters' Series on September 3, 2014.

Background information
- Born: Melvern Rivers Rutherford II; June 17, 1967 (age 59)
- Origin: Germantown, Tennessee, U.S.
- Genre: Country
- Occupation: Songwriter
- Years active: 1996–present
- Website: riversrutherford.com

Melvern Rivers Rutherford II (born June 17, 1967) is an American country music songwriter. He has written songs since at least the 1990s as a songwriter; he has written several number one country hits including "Ain't Nothing 'bout You" by Brooks & Dunn, which was the Number One country song of 2001 according to Billboard. Among the other number one songs which he has composed are "If You Ever Stop Loving Me" by Montgomery Gentry, "When I Get Where I'm Going" by Brad Paisley and Dolly Parton, "Real Good Man" by Tim McGraw, "Living in Fast Forward" by Kenny Chesney, "Ladies Love Country Boys" by Trace Adkins, and "These Are My People" by Rodney Atkins. He has also released a solo CD called Just Another Coaster. He was inducted into the Nashville Songwriters Hall of Fame in 2019

== Singles ==
Top 40 country singles co-written by Rivers Rutherford:

- The Highway Men - (Johnny Cash, Willie Nelson, Kris Kristofferson, Waylon Jennings) - "American Remains" 1990.
- Trace Adkins – "Ladies Love Country Boys"
- Gary Allan – "Smoke Rings in the Dark", "Man of Me"
- Rodney Atkins – "These Are My People"
- Brooks & Dunn – "Ain't Nothing 'bout You"
- Tracy Byrd with Mark Chesnutt – "A Good Way to Get on My Bad Side"
- Jason Michael Carroll – "I Can Sleep When I'm Dead"
- Kenny Chesney – "Living in Fast Forward"
- Terri Clark – "Dirty Girl"
- Clay Davidson – "Unconditional"
- Cole Deggs & the Lonesome – "I Got More"
- Emerson Drive – "Belongs to You"
- Josh Gracin – "I Want to Live"
- Andy Griggs – "Tonight I Wanna Be Your Man"
- Faith Hill – "When the Lights Go Down"
- JT Hodges – "Hunt You Down"
- Jamey Johnson – "Heartache"
- Toby Keith – "Bullets in the Gun"
- Tracy Lawrence – "It's All How You Look at It"
- Tim McGraw – "Real Good Man"
- Montgomery Gentry – "If You Ever Stop Loving Me", "She Don't Tell Me To"
- Brad Paisley (with Dolly Parton) – "When I Get Where I'm Going"
- Blake Shelton – "Heavy Liftin'"
- Clay Walker – "Jesus Was a Country Boy"
- Chuck Wicks – "Stealing Cinderella"
- Gretchen Wilson – "Homewrecker", "One of the Boys"
- Chely Wright – "Shut Up and Drive"
