= Invisibly Shaken =

Single by Rodney Atkins

from the album If You're Going Through Hell
- Released: April 21, 2008
- Genre: Country
- Length: 3:46
- Label: Curb
- Songwriters: Rodney Atkins; Billy Kirsch
- Producers: Ted Hewitt; Rodney Atkins

Rodney Atkins singles chronology
"Cleaning This Gun (Come On In Boy)" (2007)	"Invisibly Shaken" (2008)	"It's America" (2008)

"Invisibly Shaken" (2008) is a song written by Billy Kirsch and Rodney Atkins. It was originally recorded by Lee Greenwood from his album Stronger Than Time, which was released in 2003. It is also recorded by Atkins as the fifth and final single from his 2006 album, If You're Going Through Hell, when it was released to country radio in April 2008. The song went to number 41 on the US Billboard Hot Country Songs chart that same year.

== Content ==
In this piano ballad, a man pretends to be composed about splitting up with his girl, but is in fact, "invisibly shaken, quietly breaking, desperately taking one breath at a time."

Atkins revealed to AOL that he had to push for this to be included on the album. He recalled: "I've always loved singing that song. I turned it in and it got passed on. A&R at the time didn't acknowledge I turned it in, but the reaction we got from the crowds was such that I just forced it on there. We cut it and now it's a single."

== Critical reception ==
Ben Cisneros of Engine 145 gave it a "thumbs down", saying that "It has a weird melody and the whole first verse is sung to only a piano[…]It has the 'faux-broadway, sensitive ballad' feel that South Park uses when making fun of a Les Mis style musical". Cisneros also thought that the "lyric isn't really anything to speak of" and that Atkins' voice displayed "Pointless, naked, shameless, sensitivity".

== Music video ==
The music video of this song premiered in 2008 and was directed by Eric Welch.

== Chart performance ==
Chart (2008)	Peak position
US Hot Country Songs (Billboard)	41
