= These Are My People =

Single by Rodney Atkins

from the album If You're Going Through Hell
- Released: March 19, 2007
- Genre: Country
- Length: 3:34
- Label: Curb
- Songwriters: Dave Berg; Rivers Rutherford
- Producers: Rodney Atkins; Ted Hewitt

Rodney Atkins singles chronology
"Watching You" (2006)	"These Are My People" (2007)	"Cleaning This Gun (Come On In Boy)" (2007)

"These Are My People" is a song written by Dave Berg and Rivers Rutherford, and recorded by American country music artist Rodney Atkins. It was released in March 2007 as the third single from his platinum album If You're Going Through Hell, as well as the third straight Number One single from that album.

== Content ==
The song is an up-tempo which is introduced by a fiddle solo, with guitar also accompanying. The lyrics are the narrator's description of his rural lifestyle: specifically, the friends with whom he plays church league softball and drinks beer at a bar. The first verse references three Lynyrd Skynyrd songs: "Gimme Three Steps", "Simple Man", and "The Ballad of Curtis Loew". "Lovin' and laughin' and bustin' our asses", a line from the first verse, was changed to "lovin' and laughin' and bustin' our backs" in the radio edit and music video.

== Critical reception ==
J. Poet of Allmusic described the song favorably, saying that "It's a string of clichés, the kind of song that can sink under its own sentimental weight, but Atkins delivers it with a sly humor that makes it believable."

== Music video ==
The music video was directed by Eric Welch and premiered in May 17, 2007.

The music video reached number 1 on CMT's Top Twenty Countdown for the week of August 30, 2007.

== Chart performance ==
"These Are My People" debuted at number 57 on the U.S. Billboard Hot Country Songs for the week of March 24, 2007.

Chart (2007)	Peak position
Canada Country (Billboard)	11
US Billboard Hot 100	42
US Hot Country Songs (Billboard)	1

=== Year-end charts ===
Chart (2007)	Position
US Country Songs (Billboard)	4

== Certifications ==
Region	Certification	Certified units/sales
United States (RIAA)	Platinum	1,000,000^{‡}
^{‡} Sales+streaming figures based on certification alone.
