= Cleaning This Gun (Come On In Boy) =

"Cleaning This Gun (Come On in Boy)"

Single by Rodney Atkins

from the album If You're Going Through Hell
- Released: October 1, 2007
- Recorded: 2006
- Genre: Country
- Length: 3:46
- Label: Curb
- Songwriters: Casey Beathard; Marla Cannon-Goodman
- Producers: Ted Hewitt; Rodney Atkins

Rodney Atkins singles chronology
"These Are My People" (2007)	"Cleaning This Gun (Come On in Boy)" (2007)	"Invisibly Shaken" (2008)

"Cleaning This Gun (Come On in Boy)" is a song written by Casey Beathard and Marla Cannon-Goodman, and recorded by American country music artist Rodney Atkins. It was released in October 2007 as the fourth from his album If You're Going Through Hell. The song became Atkins' fourth consecutive number one hit on the Billboard Hot Country Songs chart, tying a record for most number ones from a country album since Tim McGraw's Set This Circus Down in 2001–2002.

== Content ==
The song begins with the narrator's recollections of his teenage years. In the first verse, he admits that while he doesn't remember much from what he learned in high school, one thing he does remember is the speech given to him by his girlfriend's father after meeting him for the first time—a speech meant to instill fear in the boy so that he doesn't misbehave when he's with the girl, ending with "I'll see you when you get back / Bet I'll be up all night still cleanin' this gun."

In the second verse, the narrator, who's now a father himself, confesses that he's "scared to death" that his own daughter is going to find a boyfriend who was just like him when he was in high school ("That teenage boy I used to be / Seems to have just one thing on his mind"), and he'll need to give that same speech to his daughter's boyfriend.

In a short bridge later in the song, the narrator admits that the approach is merely to intimidate the young suitor, but that it's extremely effective ("It's all for show, ain't nobody gonna get hurt / It's just a Daddy thing, but hey, believe me: man, it works").

The song concludes with the narrator speaking to the boyfriend with "Yeah, son, y'all buckle up and have her back by 10, uh, let's say about 9:30. Drive safe!"

== In popular culture ==
- The song is featured in the films The Bourne Legacy and Neighbours.

== Chart performance ==
Chart (2007–2008)	Peak position
Canada Country (Billboard)	5
Canada Hot 100 (Billboard)	84
US Billboard Hot 100	40
US Hot Country Songs (Billboard)	1

=== Year-end charts ===
Chart (2008)	Rank
US Country Songs (Billboard)	9

== Certifications ==
Region	Certification	Certified units/sales
United States (RIAA)	Platinum	1,000,000^{‡}
^{‡} Sales+streaming figures based on certification alone.
