= Dave Berg (songwriter) =

American country music songwriter

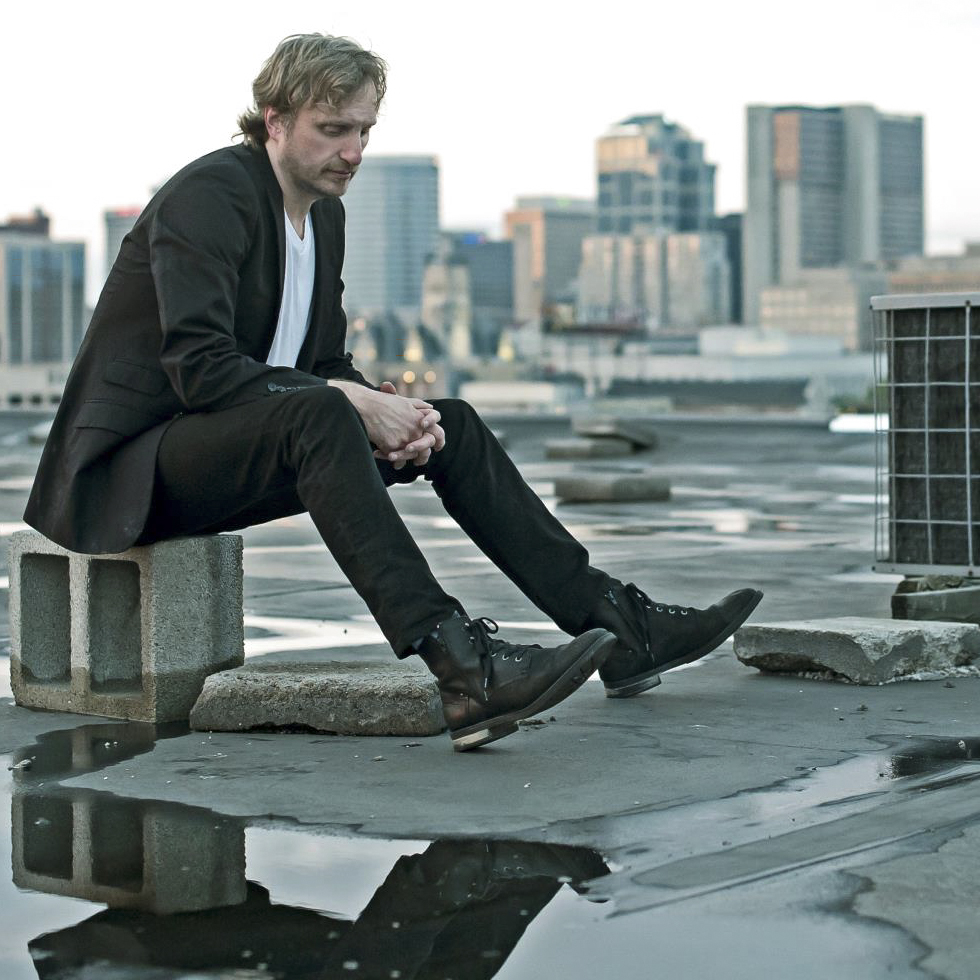
- Dave Berg in Nashville, photographed by Robbie Quinn

Background information
- Birth name: David A. Berg
- Origin: Portland, Oregon, United States
- Genres: Country
- Occupation: Songwriter
- Years active: 1995-present

Dave Berg (born in Portland, Oregon) is an American country music songwriter. His credits include the Number One country hits "If You're Going Through Hell (Before the Devil Even Knows)" and "These Are My People" by Rodney Atkins, "Somebody" by Reba McEntire, and "Moments" by Emerson Drive, as well as Top 10 country hits "Stupid Boy" by Keith Urban, "Don't Make Me" by Blake Shelton, "What Kinda Gone" by Chris Cagle, and "It's Good to Be Us" by Bucky Covington. Berg has also co-written songs for a wide array of artists such as Jewel, Carrie Underwood, Kenny Chesney, Jimmy Buffett, Darius Rucker, Meat Loaf, Tim Armstrong (of the punk band Rancid), Sarah Buxton, Ty Herndon, and others including the 2013 single "Better" by Maggie Rose. Dave Berg's songs are represented by Downtown Music Publishing.

== Biography ==
Dave Berg is a native of Portland, Oregon. He moved to Nashville in the early 1990s. Berg landed his first cut in country music in 1995 when Ty Herndon landed in the country Top Ten with "I Want My Goodbye Back".

Berg's songwriting credits include four Number One country songs: "Somebody" by Reba McEntire, "If You're Going Through Hell (Before the Devil Even Knows)" and "These Are My People" by Rodney Atkins, and "Moments" by Emerson Drive. In 2007 Berg was named both Billboard and Nashville Songwriters Association International (NSAI)’s Songwriter of the Year, as well as winning American Society of Composers, Authors and Publishers (ASCAP) Song of the Year honors for "If You’re Going Thru Hell" by Rodney Atkins. Berg was also named ASCAP’s Songwriter of the Year in 2008. In 2012, Berg signed a worldwide co-publishing agreement with Downtown Music Publishing.
