= If You're Going Through Hell (Before the Devil Even Knows) =

"If You're Going Through Hell (Before the Devil Knows)"

Single by Rodney Atkins

from the album If You're Going Through Hell
- Released: January 9, 2006
- Recorded: 2005
- Genre: Country
- Length: 3:36
- Label: Curb
- Songwriters: Sam Tate, Annie Tate, Dave Berg
- Producers: Ted Hewitt; Rodney Atkins

Rodney Atkins singles chronology
"Monkey in the Middle" (2004)	"If You're Going Through Hell (Before the Devil Knows)" (2006)	"Watching You" (2006)

"If You're Going Through Hell (Before the Devil Knows)" is a song written by Dave Berg, Sam Tate and Annie Tate, and recorded by American country music artist Rodney Atkins. It was released in January 2006 as the lead-off single to his second studio album If You're Going Through Hell. The song became Atkins' first number one hit on the U.S. Billboard Hot Country Songs chart, spending four weeks at that position. The song also peaked at number 33 on the Billboard Hot 100. "If You're Going Through Hell" was named the number-one song of 2006 on the Billboard's year-end chart.

== Content ==
The title was inspired by two quotes: one falsely attributed to Winston Churchill ("If you're going through Hell, keep going.") and the other, an old Irish toast ("May you be in Heaven five minutes before the devil knows you're dead").

== Music video ==
The music video was directed by Eric Welch and premiered on June 22, 2006. It starts out with Rodney Atkins's car tearing up, and he winds up walking on the road with a string of bad luck throughout the video, like losing his luggage when he throws it in the back of someone's car which winds up taking off on him. The video features Atkins's band and Atkins singing the song under an old gas station sign.

The video peaked at number 1 on CMT's Top Twenty Countdown for two consecutive weeks in September 2006.

== Chart performance ==
"If You're Going Through Hell (Before the Devil Knows)" debuted at #53 on the U.S. Billboard Hot Country Songs chart for the week of January 21, 2006.

Chart (2006)	Peak position
Canada Country (Billboard)	1
US Billboard Hot 100	33
US Hot Country Songs (Billboard)	1

=== Year-end charts ===
Chart (2006)	Position
US Country Songs (Billboard)	1

== Certifications ==
Region	Certification	Certified units/sales
United States (RIAA)	Platinum	1,000,000^{‡}
^{‡} Sales+streaming figures based on certification alone.
