= Watching You (Rodney Atkins song) =

2006 single by Rodney Atkins

Single by Rodney Atkins

from the album If You're Going Through Hell
- Released: September 18, 2006
- Genre: Country
- Length: 3:55
- Label: Curb
- Songwriters: Rodney Atkins; Steve Dean; Brian Gene White
- Producers: Ted Hewitt; Rodney Atkins

Rodney Atkins singles chronology
"If You're Going Through Hell (Before the Devil Even Knows)" (2006)	"Watching You" (2006)	"These Are My People" (2007)

"Watching You" is a song co-written and recorded by American country music artist Rodney Atkins. It was released in September 18, 2006 as the second single from the album If You're Going Through Hell. The single became his second number-one single on the Billboard U.S. Hot Country Songs chart. It was named the number-one song of 2007 on Billboard's year-end chart. The song was written by Atkins, Steve Dean, and Brian Gene White.

== Background and writing ==
The song was inspired by Atkins's son, Elijah. After finding out that Elijah had been singing his father's 2006 single "If You're Going Through Hell (Before the Devil Even Knows)" to his teachers, Atkins then had to explain to his son that it "might not be appropriate for him to be singing that in school."

== Content ==
The song is a moderate up-tempo portraying two examples of a son learning from his father. In the first verse, the father and son are in the car together, driving through town. The son is eating a Happy Meal in the passenger seat, just as the father slams on the brakes at a red light, causing the boy to spill his food all over himself and say "a four-letter word" (implied to be "shit"). The father asks where his son learned "to talk like that", and the boy then responds with the refrain, "I've been watching you. / Dad, ain't that cool? / I'm your buckaroo, I wanna be like you."

In the second verse, the father heads out to his barn and begins to pray ("Lord, please help me help my stupid self.") Still later, at bedtime, the boy kneels beside his bed to pray as well, with his father watching. Upon hearing the boy's prayers, the father asks "Where'd you learn to pray like that?" to which the boy again responds by saying that he has been watching his father. The father then responds by hugging his son and stating his pride in the boy.

In the final verse, the boy expresses that he will "still know what to do" when he is grown up, highlighting the importance of being a good example.

== Music video ==
The video portrays the events which are laid out in the song's lyrics. Elijah also portrays the child in the song's video, and as a result, he has gained recognition in public. It was Atkins' second video directed by Eric Welch.

The music video reached number 1 on CMT's Top Twenty Countdown for the week of January 11, 2007.

== Watching You 2.0 ==
On May 23, 2025, Atkins released a second version of the song, titled "Watching You 2.0", as a promotional single. This new rendition brings the song full circle, as it features Atkins' son, Elijah, whom the song was written about, singing the choruses that his father originally sang from his son's perspective.

"Watching You 2.0"

Promotional single by Rodney Atkins featuring Elijah Atkins

from the album True South
- Released: May 23, 2025
- Genre: Country
- Length: 3:57
- Label: Curb
- Songwriters: Rodney Atkins; Steve Dean; Brian Gene White
- Producers: Rodney Atkins; Seth Mosley; Mike X. O'Connor

== Charts ==
Chart (2006–2007)	Peak Position
Canada Country (Billboard)	3
US Billboard Hot 100	36
US Hot Country Songs (Billboard)	1

=== Year-end charts ===
Chart (2007)	Position
US Country Songs (Billboard)	1

== Certifications ==
Region	Certification	Certified units/sales
United States (RIAA)	3× Platinum	3,000,000^{‡}
^{‡} Sales+streaming figures based on certification alone.
