= Ted Hewitt =

American singer-songwriter

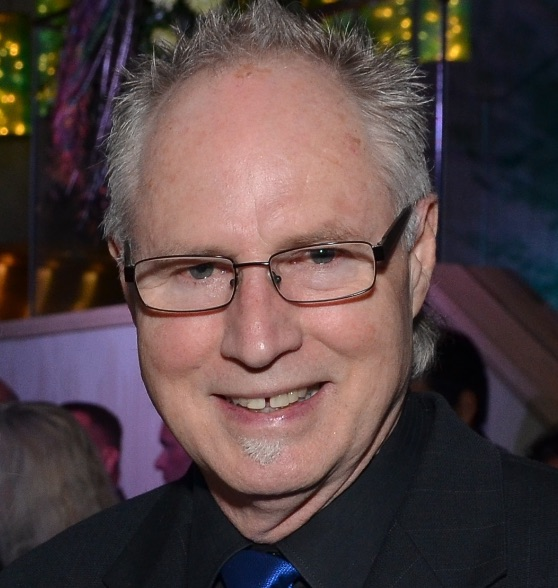

Background information
- Born: Baltimore, Maryland, United States
- Origin: Nashville, Tennessee, United States
- Genres: Country; Gospel
- Occupations: Producer; Songwriter; Singer; Musician
- Years active: 1984–present

Ted Hewitt is an American country music producer, songwriter, singer, and musician who has written and performed songs for numerous acts including Rodney Atkins, Tracy Byrd, Glen Campbell, Reba McEntire, and others. He co-produced Atkins' 2006 album, If You're Going Through Hell, which was certified platinum by the RIAA. Other popular tracks written or produced by Hewitt include "Love Lessons" by Tracy Byrd (#9 on Billboard's Hot Country Songs) and "Wine into Water" by T. Graham Brown (#44).

== Early life and education ==
Hewitt grew up in Baltimore, Maryland and was the child of two professional musicians. His father was an opera singer and actor who appeared alongside Andy Griffith in the Broadway production of No Time for Sergeants. Hewitt learned how to play the guitar at the age of 15. His father died early in his life. Hewitt graduated from Emory College in Atlanta, Georgia before moving to Nashville, Tennessee in 1984. It was there that he began his career in country music.

== Career ==
Upon arriving in Nashville, Hewitt worked closely with producers like Buddy Cannon and Country legend Mel Tillis. Tillis signed Hewitt to a publishing contract in 1985. His first cut was called "Leavin' Eyes" which he wrote for Glen Campbell. Hewitt also sang on the recording of the song. After his publishing contract with Tillis ended, Hewitt toured with a range of artists including Vern Gosdin, Suzy Bogguss, and Lee Greenwood.

Hewitt went back to writing and composing in 1992 when he signed a publishing contract with Lee Greenwood. In 1995, he wrote Tracy Byrd's "Love Lessons" which peaked at #9 on Billboard's list of Hot Country Songs. While working for Greenwood, Hewitt also met Rodney Atkins and formed a songwriting partnership that continues to the present day. Hewitt helped Atkins earn a record contract at Curb Records in 1997. The following year, he wrote T. Graham Brown's "Wine into Water" which peaked at #44 on the Hot Country Songs list.

Hewitt produced Rodney Atkins' 2003 album Honesty which peaked at #50 on the Billboard list of Top Country Albums. This ultimately led to Hewitt producing Atkins' 2006 platinum-selling album, If You're Going Through Hell. The album peaked at #1 on the Top Country Albums list and at #3 on the Billboard 200 list and contained four #1 singles. In recognition of the album, Atkins was awarded the Academy of Country Music Award for Top New Male Vocalist in 2006. The album was also nominated for Album of the Year, the title track was nominated for Song of the Year, and Hewitt himself was nominated for Producer of the Year.

Hewitt has also produced other albums and tracks for Rodney Atkins including the albums It's America (2009) and Take a Back Road (2011). Most recently, Hewitt produced a 2014 single for Atkins called "Eat Sleep Love You Repeat." In 2014, Hewitt was nominated by the Canadian Country Music Association (CCMA) for the Best Record Producer award for his work on Brett Kissel's album, Started with a Song. He was again nominated for a CCMA Award in 2017 for Songwriter of the Year for co-writing Brett Kissel's song, "Cool with That." Over the course of his career, Hewitt has also produced and performed on albums for artists like Waylon Jennings, Reba McEntire, Wynonna Judd, Les Taylor, Alabama, and numerous others.

== Selected discography ==
=== Studio albums ===
==== As producer ====
Title	Details	Peak chart positions				Certifications (sales threshold)
Title	Details	US Country	US	US Heat	CAN	Certifications (sales threshold)
Honesty	Artist: Rodney Atkins; Release date: October 14, 2003; Label: Curb Records	50	—	47	—	
If You're Going Through Hell	Artist: Rodney Atkins; Release date: July 18, 2006; Label: Curb Records	1	3	—	—	US: Platinum
It's America	Artist: Rodney Atkins; Release date: March 31, 2009; Label: Curb Records	3	15	—	—	US: Gold
Take a Back Road	Artist: Rodney Atkins; Release date: October 4, 2011; Label: Curb Records	3	8	—	—	US: Gold
Started with a Song	Artist: Brett Kissel; Release date: October 1, 2013; Label: Warner Music Canada	—	—	—	22	
"—" denotes releases that did not chart

==== As vocalist ====
Title	Details	Peak chart positions			Certifications (sales threshold)
Title	Details	US Country	US	US Heat	Certifications (sales threshold)
My Kind of Country	Artist: Reba McEntire; Release date: October 1984; Label: MCA	13	—	—	US: Gold
Voices in the Wind	Artist: Suzy Bogguss; Release date: October 6, 1992; Label: Liberty Records	31	116	—	US: Gold
Something Up My Sleeve	Artist: Suzy Bogguss; Release date: September 21, 1993; Label: Liberty Records	27	121	—	US: Gold
Craig Morgan	Artist: Craig Morgan; Release date: May 30, 2000; Label: Atlantic Nashville	—	—	—	
"—" denotes releases that did not chart

=== Singles ===
==== As songwriter/producer ====
Song	Year	Artist	Album	Role	Notes
"Leavin' Eyes"	1984	Glen Campbell	Letter to Home	Writer, producer	
"Cruisin'"	1986	Alabama	The Touch	Writer	
"No More Tears"	1994	David Ball	David Ball	Writer	
"Love Lessons"	1995	Tracy Byrd	Love Lessons	Writer	US Country #9
"Wine into Water"	1998	T. Graham Brown	Wine into Water	Writer	US Country #44
"Don't Think I Won't"	1998	Mark Wills	Wish You Were Here	Writer	
"She Rides Wild Horses"	1999	Kenny Rogers	She Rides Wild Horses	Writer	
"He Rocks"	2000	Wynonna Judd	New Day Dawning	Writer	
"Monkey in the Middle"	2003	Rodney Atkins	Honesty	Writer, producer	
"Honesty (Write Me a List)"	2003	Rodney Atkins	Honesty	Producer, vocals	US Country #4
"Someone to Share it With"	2003	Rodney Atkins	Honesty	Writer, producer	
"The Man I Am Today"	2003	Rodney Atkins	Honesty	Writer, producer	
"My Old Man"	2003	Rodney Atkins	Honesty	Writer, producer	US Country #36
"Wasted Whiskey"	2006	Rodney Atkins	If You're Going Through Hell	Writer, producer	
"Cleaning This Gun (Come On In Boy)"	2006	Rodney Atkins	If You're Going Through Hell	Producer, vocals	US Country #1; US Gold
"Watching You"	2006	Rodney Atkins	If You're Going Through Hell	Producer, vocals	US Country #1; US Platinum
"If You're Going Through Hell (Before the Devil Even Knows)"	2006	Rodney Atkins	If You're Going Through Hell	Producer, vocals	US Country #1; US Platinum
"These Are My People"	2006	Rodney Atkins	If You're Going Through Hell	Producer, vocals	US Country #1; US Gold
"Home Sweet Oklahoma"	2008	Patti Page and Vince Gill	Best Country Songs	Writer, producer	
"Chasin' Girls"	2009	Rodney Atkins	It's America	Writer, producer	
"It's America"	2009	Rodney Atkins	It's America	Producer, vocals	US Country #1
"15 Minutes"	2009	Rodney Atkins	It's America	Producer, vocals	US Country #20
"Farmer's Daughter"	2010	Rodney Atkins	It's America	Producer, vocals	US Country #5; US Platinum
"Growing Up Like That"	2011	Rodney Atkins	Take a Back Road	Writer, producer	
"Take a Back Road"	2011	Rodney Atkins	Take a Back Road	Producer	US Country #1; US Platinum
"He's Mine"	2011	Rodney Atkins	Take a Back Road	Producer, vocals	US Country #23
"Tips"	2011	Rodney Atkins	Take a Back Road	Writer, producer	
"Lifelines"	2011	Rodney Atkins	Take a Back Road	Writer, producer	
"Cool with That"	2015	Brett Kissel	Pick Me Up	Writer	
"Wine Into Water"	2015	T. Graham Brown	Forever Changed	Writer	
"Wine Into Water"	2016	Loretta Lynn	Full Circle	Writer	
"Nights in the Sun"	2017	Brett Kissel	We Were That Song	Writer	
