= Rodney Atkins =

American country music artist

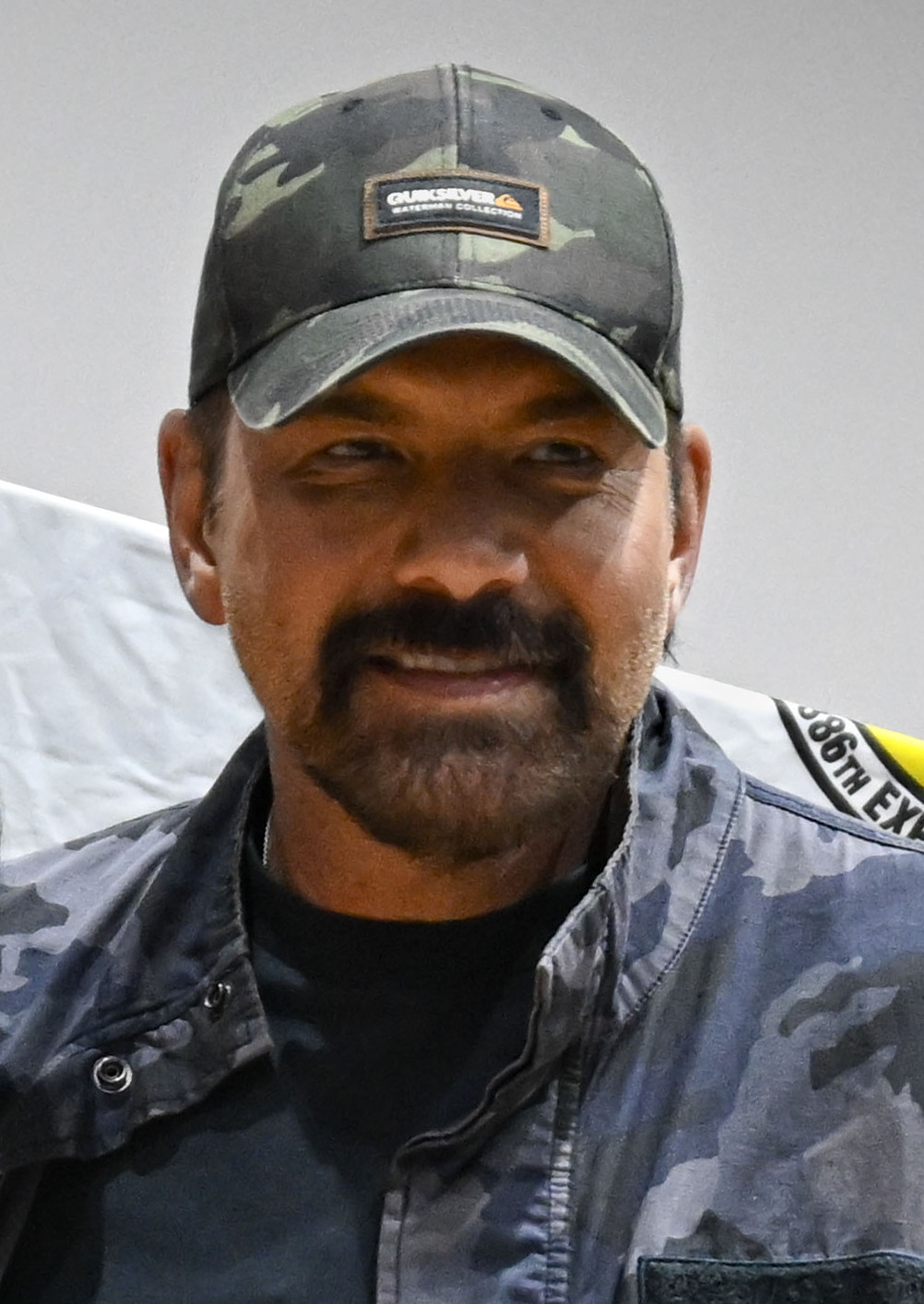
- Atkins in 2025

Background information
- Born: Rodney Allan Atkins; March 28, 1969 (age 57); Knoxville, Tennessee, U.S.
- Origin: Cumberland Gap, Tennessee, U.S.
- Genres: Country
- Occupations: Singer; songwriter
- Instruments: Vocals; guitar
- Years active: 1996–present
- Label: Curb
- Spouses: Tammy Jo McDonald (m. 1998; div. 2012) Rose Falcon (m. 2013)
- Website: rodneyatkins.com

Rodney Allan Atkins (born March 28, 1969) is an American country music singer and songwriter. Signed to Curb Records in 1996, he charted his first single on the Billboard country chart in 1997, but did not release an album until 2003's Honesty, which included the hit single "Honesty (Write Me a List)".

If You're Going Through Hell, his second album, was released in 2006. Its first two singles, "If You're Going Through Hell (Before the Devil Even Knows)" and "Watching You", each spent four weeks at number one the country music chart, and were respectively ranked as the top country songs of 2006 and 2007 according to Billboard Year-End. The album, which has since been certified platinum in the United States, produced two more number one singles in "These Are My People" and "Cleaning This Gun (Come On In Boy)". It's America (2009) included the number one single "It's America" and the Top 5 hit "Farmer's Daughter", which was added to a later reissue of the album. Take a Back Road (2011) produced his sixth number one in its title track, and 2019's Caught Up in the Country set a record for the longest run on the country singles charts with its title track. Atkins has received six nominations from the Academy of Country Music and two from the Country Music Association, winning Top New Male Vocalist from the former in 2006.

== Early life ==
Rodney Allan Atkins was born March 28, 1969, in Knoxville, Tennessee. His biological mother, who was 19 at the time, became pregnant with him after a "traumatic first date". She hid the pregnancy from her parents and put him up for adoption at the Holston United Methodist Home for Children in Greeneville, Tennessee. His first adoptive parents, Charles Hutchins and Linda Weems, returned him to the home after he developed a major respiratory infection. Allan and Margaret Atkins, who had lost a newborn about a year prior, inquired after the child, but decided not to proceed due to surgery that Margaret had just undergone. Meanwhile, another couple adopted him, but also returned him soon after when he developed colic. After Margaret Atkins recovered, she proceeded to adopt him. Atkins did not meet his biological mother until 2008, and has never revealed her identity.

The Atkins family moved frequently in his youth, eventually settling in Claiborne County, Tennessee. He attended high school at Powell Valley High in Speedwell, Tennessee. During high school, Atkins played guitar in his spare time at events and festivals. After graduating from Walters State Community College, he went to Tennessee Tech in Cookeville, Tennessee, where he made friends with songwriters and soon began writing himself. In the mid-1990s, Atkins moved to Nashville, Tennessee, to pursue a recording career. He signed with Curb Records in 1996, the same week that LeAnn Rimes did.

== Musical career ==
=== Rodney Atkins ===
Atkins's debut single, "In a Heartbeat", spent one week at number 74 on the Billboard Hot Country Singles & Tracks (now Hot Country Songs) chart dated for August 30, 1997. One of the song's cowriters was Brian Gowan, who was also recording on Curb at the time as one-half of Blake & Brian. Its b-side, "God Only Knows", was also released as a single, but did not chart. His debut album was slated for release on September 16 of the same year, but it was never released due to Atkins' dissatisfaction with his material. He discussed his dissatisfaction while sitting next to Curb Records owner Mike Curb on an airplane; Curb allowed him to switch producers, and Atkins chose Ted Hewitt, with whom he had been working on demos. Hewitt also changed Atkins' style from a cowboy appearance and a vocal style similar to Roy Orbison to a more polished appearance. Atkins, Hewitt, and Max T. Barnes wrote the track "Don't Think I Won't" on Mark Wills' 1998 album Wish You Were Here, but he was otherwise inactive until 2002. "In a Heartbeat" later appeared on the soundtrack of the 2008 film Camille.

=== Honesty ===
In mid-2002, Rodney Atkins released his third single, "Sing Along". Both it and its followup, "My Old Man", peaked in the lower regions of the Top 40 on the country chart. He entered the Top 10 for the first time in late 2003-early 2004 with "Honesty (Write Me a List)", which went on to peak at number 4 on the country charts and 57 on the Billboard Hot 100. The song was the title track to his album Honesty, which was released by the end of 2003. "Someone to Share It With" and "Monkey in the Middle" (both also co-written by Gowan) were also issued as singles, with the former peaking at number 41 on the country charts. Atkins told the Associated Press that he chose to record "Honesty" because he and producer Ted Hewitt wanted a twelfth song for the album, and co-writer David Kent had recommended it to Hewitt.

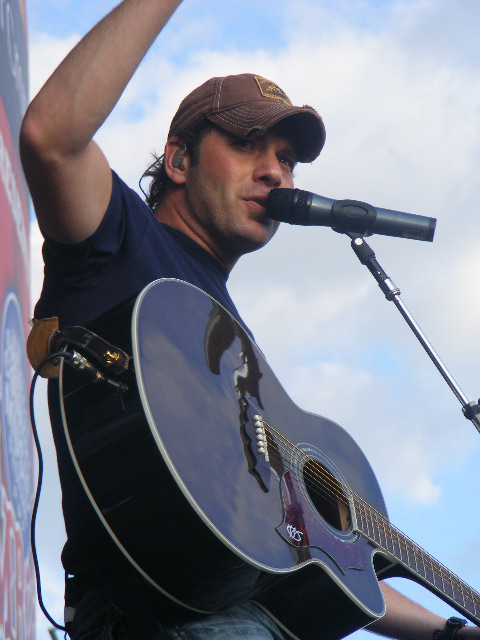
Rodney Atkins in concert in 2009

Jeffrey B. Remz of Country Standard Time gave the album a mixed review. He thought that Atkins seemed too similar in sound to labelmate Tim McGraw, but praised some of the songs for having strong melodies. A more favorable review came from Matt Bjorke of About.com, who called it a "confident debut from a talented newcomer."

=== If You're Going Through Hell ===
Having been absent from the country music charts for most of 2004 and 2005, he returned in 2006 with a single entitled "If You're Going Through Hell (Before the Devil Even Knows)", which served as the lead-off to his second released album, If You're Going Through Hell. With this album, Atkins once again changed his musical image. He started wearing baseball caps and performing "songs about his life." "If You're Going Through Hell" became his first number 1, spending four weeks at the top of the Hot Country Songs charts; it was also the top country hit of 2006 according to Billboard Year-End.

Following "If You're Going Through Hell" was "Watching You", which Atkins wrote with Steve Dean and Brian Gene White. This song was inspired by Atkins' son, Elijah, who also stars in its music video. "Watching You" was also a four-week number 1 hit, and the top country song of 2007 on the Billboard Year-End charts. "These Are My People" and "Cleaning This Gun (Come On In Boy)" also went to number 1, making If You're Going Through Hell the first country album to include four number 1 singles since Tim McGraw's 2001 album Set This Circus Down. The album's final single was "Invisibly Shaken", which Lee Greenwood previously recorded on his 2003 album Stronger Than Time. Atkins' version of the song peaked at number 41. If You're Going Through Hell received a platinum certification from the Recording Industry Association of America (RIAA) for shipments of one million copies, while "If You're Going Through Hell", "Watching You", and "Cleaning This Gun" all received gold certifications for 500,000 music downloads. These songs also made top 40 on the Hot 100 while they were climbing the country charts, while "These Are My People" reached number 42. Atkins also received the 2006 Academy of Country Music award for Top New Male Vocalist, and "If You're Going Through Hell" was nominated for Song of the Year. Atkins toured in late 2007-early 2008 as an opening act on Brad Paisley's Bonfires & Amplifiers Tour.

J. Poet of Allmusic gave the album a positive review, praising the "less produced sound" and Atkins' vocals on the singles. A mixed review came from Country Standard Time, whose Robert Loy criticized Atkins for singing "about what a good ol' boy he is" on several songs, but adding that "it's fairly obvious he's at least as country as anybody else on the charts these days".

=== It's America ===
Atkins's thirteenth single, "It's America", was released in November 2008. It was the first single from his third album, It's America, released in March 2009. Atkins promoted the album through appearances on Larry King Live and a pre-sale promotion on his website. On the chart dated May 2, 2009, "It's America" became his fifth number 1 hit. Its followup, "15 Minutes", was released in May 2009 and peaked at number 20 in September. Atkins re-wrote the album's third single, "Chasin' Girls", for his wife to make it more applicable to their life at the time. After executives at Curb saw the lyrics, the re-written version was released as the album's third single, but did not make top 40. "Farmer's Daughter" followed in early 2010, and after it reached top 5 late in the year, Curb added it and the re-recording of "Chasin' Girls" to a re-issue of It's America. The label also re-released If You're Going Through Hell for exclusive sale at Cracker Barrel restaurants, with "Farmer's Daughter" and the previously unreleased song "More Like Your Memory (Always Takes Me Back)" added to the track listing.

It's America received mixed reviews. Todd Sterling of Allmusic and Liz Jungers of Roughstock both criticized it for lacking musical variety. It was more favorably reviewed at Country Standard Time, with critic Jeff Lincoln criticizing the title track as "forced" but saying that otherwise, "Atkins has found his niche of singing about the southern tribe."

=== Take a Back Road ===
"Take a Back Road", the lead-off single and title track to his fourth album Take a Back Road, was released in April 2011. It became his sixth (and to date, final) number 1 late in the year, and accounted for his highest placement on the Hot 100, at number 23. The song was co-written by Luke Laird and Rhett Akins, the latter of whom co-wrote "Farmer's Daughter". "He's Mine" was the album's second single. The song was originally recorded by Billy Ray Cyrus, and Atkins chose to release it because it received positive reactions from fans in concert. It peaked at number 23 on the country chart in April 2012. "Just Wanna Rock N' Roll", the album's third single, peaked at number 31 on the Country Airplay chart in late 2012.

Country Standard Time called Atkins "the type of wholesome country musician that you would enjoy hanging out with on a Sunday afternoon with your wife and kids." It received a "B" from Entertainment Weekly, whose Mikael Wood wrote that Atkins "makes for a first-rate correspondent from Anytown, USA."

=== Greatest Hits and Caught Up in the Country ===
In September 2013, Atkins released the single "Doin' It Right", which peaked at 53 on the Country Airplay chart. It was followed in October 2014 by "Eat Sleep Love You Repeat", which was co-written by Walker Hayes and Ryan Bizarri. The latter song appears on Atkins' Greatest Hits compilation, released in February 2015. This album also includes ten of his previous singles, plus the album cut "About the South" from If You're Going Through Hell.

In 2018, Atkins released a new single titled "Caught Up in the Country", which features the Fisk Jubilee Singers on backing vocals. This is the first single from an album of the same name, released via Curb on May 10, 2019. As with his other albums, Hewitt again serves as producer. The album includes a song written about Atkins' grandmother-in-law. "Caught Up in the Country" spent 57 weeks on the Country Airplay charts, setting a new record for the longest continuous run on that chart in May 2019. On August 21, Rodney Atkins released a second single titled, "Thank God for You". This was followed in 2021 by a cover of Anne Murray's "A Little Good News".

Atkins released a new single in November 2024 titled "True South". He co-produced the track with Jordan Schmidt and co-wrote with Rose Falcon, Redferrin, and Jake Saghi. This was followed in 2025 with "Watching You 2.0", a re-recording of "Watching You" with guest vocals from his son Elijah, who inspired the original song. This was followed in 2026 by a new studio album also titled True South, which features the single "The Years Are Short".

== Personal life ==
Atkins is married to country singer Rose Falcon.

Atkins has been married twice. He married Tammy Jo McDonald in 1998, and the two had a son named Elijah. He also had two stepdaughters, Lindsey and Morgan, from McDonald's previous marriage.

Atkins was arrested in November 2011 for allegedly trying to smother his wife with a pillow, while his 10-year-old son watched. He was released on $2,500 bail three hours after the arrest, and was ordered by the Williamson County, Tennessee, court to take an anger assessment which found no need for any further action. The altercation was disputed by Atkins' lawyer, who stated that it was purely verbal. Atkins filed for divorce within 24 hours of the alleged assault. The divorce was settled in late September 2012. In February 2012, Atkins was cleared of the domestic assault charge.

In June 2013, Atkins became engaged to singer Rose Falcon. The couple married on November 10, 2013. Together, they have two sons, born in December 2017 and August 2019.

== Discography ==
Studio albums

- Honesty (2003)
- If You're Going Through Hell (2006)
- It's America (2009)
- Take a Back Road (2011)
- Caught Up in the Country (2019)
- True South (2026)

Compilation albums

- Greatest Hits (2015)

Number-one singles (U.S. Billboard Hot Country Songs)

- "If You're Going Through Hell (Before the Devil Even Knows)" (4 weeks) (2006)
- "Watching You" (4 weeks) (2007)
- "These Are My People" (1 week) (2007)
- "Cleaning This Gun (Come On In Boy)" (2 weeks) (2008)
- "It's America" (2 weeks) (2009)
- "Take a Back Road" (2 weeks) (2011)
