= Eddy Raven discography =

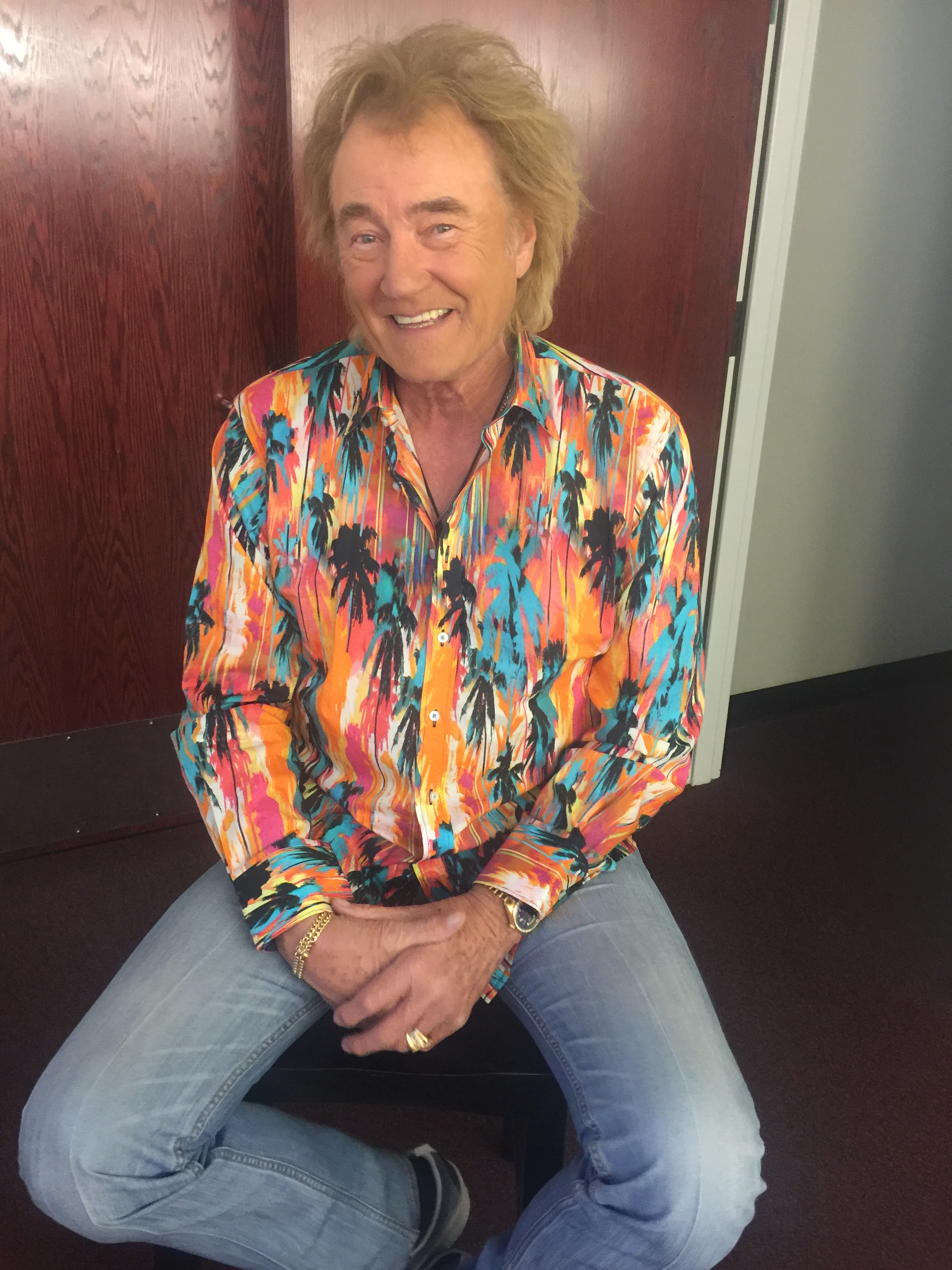
- Eddy Raven in 2016
- Studio albums: 14
- Live albums: 1
- Compilation albums: 5
- Singles: 52
- Music videos: 12
- No.1 Single: 6

The discography of American country music singer Eddy Raven consists of 14 studio albums and 52 singles. Although Raven first charted in 1974, he did not reach Top 10 on the Hot Country Songs charts until "She's Playing Hard to Forget" in 1982. Between then and 1990, Raven had six songs reach No. 1 on that chart, and twelve more that reached top 10.

== Studio albums ==
=== 1970s and 1980s ===
Title	Album details	Peak chart positions	
Title	Album details	US Country	CAN Country
That Cajun Country Sound	Release date: 1973; Label: LaLouisianne Records	—	—
This Is Eddy Raven	Release date: 1976; Label: ABC Records	—	—
Eyes	Release date: July 1980; Label: Dimension Records	55	—
Desperate Dreams	Release date: September 1981; Label: Elektra Records	26	—
I Could Use Another You	Release date: June 1984; Label: RCA Records Nashville	41	8
Love and Other Hard Times	Release date: July 1985; Label: RCA Records Nashville	64	—
Right Hand Man	Release date: December 1986; Label: RCA Records Nashville	18	—
Temporary Sanity	Release date: February 1988; Label: Universal Records	31	25
"—" denotes releases that did not chart

=== 1990s and 2000s ===
Title	Album details
Right for the Flight	Release date: April 9, 1991; Label: Capitol Records Nashville
Wild Eyed and Crazy	Release date: June 1994; Label: Intersound Records
Cookin' Cajun (with Jo-El Sonnier)	Release date: August 1996; Label: K-tel
Living in Black and White	Release date: March 6, 2001; Label: Row Music Group
All Grassed Up (with Carolina Road)	Release date: July 21, 2017; Label: Pinecastle Records

== Compilation albums ==
Title	Album details	Peak positions
Title	Album details	US Country
Thank God for Kids	Release date: 1984; Label: MCA Records	—
The Best of Eddy Raven	Release date: February 1988; Label: RCA Records	36
Greatest Hits	Release date: August 21, 1990; Label: Warner Bros. Records	—
Greatest Country Hits	Release date: September 1990; Label: Curb Records	—
20 Favorites	Release date: January 27, 1998; Label: Capitol Nashville	—
I Got Mexico: The RCA Singles A's and B's	Release date: November 14, 2000; Label: Westside Records	—
"—" denotes releases that did not chart

== Live albums ==
Title	Album details
Live at Billy Bob's Texas	Release date: April 1999; Label: Smith Music Group

== Singles ==
=== 1960s – 1970s ===
Year	Single	Peak chart positions		Album
Year	Single	US Country	CAN Country	Album
1962	"Once a Fool"	—	—	—N/a
1969	"Lied to Judy"	—	—	—N/a
1973	"Colinda"	—	—	That Cajun Country Sound
1973	"Arkansas Sun"	—	—	—N/a
1973	"Sam"	—	—	—N/a
1974	"Last of the Sunshine Cowboys"	63	—	—N/a
1974	"Carolina Country Morning"	—	—	—N/a
1974	"Ain't She Somethin' Else"	46	34	This Is Eddy Raven
1975	"Good News, Bad News"	27	40	This Is Eddy Raven
1975	"You're My Rainy Day Woman"	68	—	This Is Eddy Raven
1975	"Free to Be"	34	46	This Is Eddy Raven
1976	"I Wanna Live"	87	—	This Is Eddy Raven
1976	"Curse of a Woman"	94	—	—N/a
1976	"I'm Losing It All"	90	—	—N/a
1978	"Colinda" (re-release)	—	—	That Cajun Country Sound
1978	"You're a Dancer"	71	—	—N/a
1979	"Sweet Mother Texas"	44	—	Eyes
"—" denotes releases that did not chart

=== 1980s – 2000s ===
Year	Single	Peak chart positions		Album
Year	Single	US Country	CAN Country	Album
1980	"Dealin' with the Devil"	25	—	Eyes
1980	"You've Got Those Eyes"	30	—	Eyes
1980	"Another Texas Song"	34	—	Eyes
1980	"Peace of Mind"	23	—	Eyes
1981	"I Should've Called"	13	—	Desperate Dreams
1981	"Who Do You Know in California"	11	—	Desperate Dreams
1982	"A Little Bit Crazy"	14	43	Desperate Dreams
1982	"She's Playing Hard to Forget"	10	—	Desperate Dreams
1982	"San Antonio Nights"	25	—	—N/a
1984	"I Got Mexico"	1	1	I Could Use Another You
1984	"I Could Use Another You"	9	6	I Could Use Another You
1984	"She's Gonna Win Your Heart"	9	5	I Could Use Another You
1985	"Operator, Operator"	9	8	Love and Other Hard Times
1985	"I Wanna Hear It from You"	8	6	Love and Other Hard Times
1985	"You Should Have Been Gone by Now"	3	3	Love and Other Hard Times
1986	"Sometimes a Lady"	3	2	Right Hand Man
1986	"Right Hand Man"	3	5	Right Hand Man
1987	"You're Never Too Old for Young Love"	3	6	Right Hand Man
1987	"Shine, Shine, Shine"	1	1	Right Hand Man
1988	"I'm Gonna Get You"	1	1	The Best of Eddy Raven
1988	"Joe Knows How to Live"	1	1	The Best of Eddy Raven
1988	"'Til You Cry"	4	7	The Best of Eddy Raven
1989	"In a Letter to You"	1	1	Temporary Sanity
1989	"Bayou Boys"	1	1	Temporary Sanity
1989	"Sooner or Later"	6	18	Temporary Sanity
1990	"Island"	10	6	Temporary Sanity
1990	"Zydeco Lady"	56	44	Temporary Sanity
1991	"Rock Me in the Rhythm of Your Love"	60	80	Right for the Flight
1991	"Too Much Candy for a Dime"	68	35	Right for the Flight
1998	"Johnny's Got a Pistol"	—	—	20 Favorites
1998	"Somebody's Tearin' the Flag"	—	—	20 Favorites
2001	"Cowboys Don't Cry"	60	—	Living in Black and White
2001	"Living in Black and White"	—	—	Living in Black and White
2002	"New Orleans Is a Mighty Good Town" (with Buckwheat Zydeco)	—	—	Living in Black and White
2005	"Tequila Tells"	—	—	Knowin' How to Live
"—" denotes releases that did not chart

== Other singles ==
=== Guest singles ===
Year	Single	Artist	Album
1998	"Catahoula"	The Bellamy Brothers (with Jo-El Sonnier)	Over the Line

== Music videos ==
Year	Video	Director
1980	"Dealin' with the Devil"	—N/a
1984	"She's Gonna Win Your Heart"	David Hogan
1986	"Sometimes a Lady"	John Dahl
1988	"'Til You Cry"	Michael Salomon
1990	"Island"	Larry Boothby
1994	"Rip Rap Road"	
1996	"Fais Do Do" (with Jo-El Sonnier)	Bob Whitt
1997	"Sugar Bee" (with Jo-El Sonnier)	
1998	"Catahoula" (with The Bellamy Brothers and Jo-El Sonnier)	chris rogers
1998	"Johnny's Got a Pistol"	
1998	"Somebody's Tearin' the Flag"	Tamara Walker
2000	"Cowboys Don't Cry"	Larry Boothby
2002	"New Orleans Is a Mighty Good Town" (with Buckwheat Zydeco)	Peter Lippman
