= List of songs written by Frank J. Myers =

This is an alphabetical list of songs written or co-written by the American singer-songwriter Frank J. Myers.

Song (date), Writers - Artist

== 0-9 ==
- 100 Days, 100 Nights - 98 Degrees, Stephen Craig
- 3935 West End Ave - Mason-Dixon

== A ==
- Alvarado - Alvarado
- A Man’s Not a Man (Till He’s Loved By A Woman) - Barbara Mandrell
- A Rose in the Sand - The Shoppe
- Any Ole Stretch of Blacktop, Myers/Nelson - Collin Raye, Shenandoah
- Another Day Goes By - Stephen Craig
- As Long as You Want Me To - Ronan Keating

== B ==
- Bad Habits - Mel McDaniel
- Bayou Boys - Eddy Raven
- Beautiful Life - Donny & Marie
- Beautiful Women- Whiskey Falls
- Boys Like Us (2006), Geiger/Martin/Myers - Heartland
- Bending Rules and Breaking Hearts - High Noon
- Burning a Hole in My Head, Griggs/Kees/Myers/McBride – Andy Griggs

== C ==
- Carry the Cross (2007), Myers/Rausch/McDonald - Richie McDonald
- Changes - Tanya Tucker, Eddy Raven
- Class Reunion (That Used to Be Us), Pfrimmer/Myers/McDonald - Lonestar
- Come In Out of the Pain, Myers/Pfrimmer - Doug Stone
- Cross My Heart - All-4-One

== D ==
- Don’t Look In My Eyes - Barbara Mandrell (1985), Joan Kennedy (1987)

== E ==
- Early in the Morning and Late at Night - Hank Williams, Jr.
- Entre Dos – Fey - Mexico
- Everyday I Love You - Boyzone

== F ==
- Faith (2007), Myers/Eustice/McDonald - Richie McDonald
- Find a Way - Richie McDonald
- Five Days of Glory - Krista Marie
- Folks Out on the Road, Myers/Raven - Eddy Raven, Waylon Jennings & Johnny Cash
- Forever One – Steven Craig

== G ==
- Goin’ Down – Steven Craig
- Gotta Get Next to That - Ariel Rivera
- God's Got This - Frank Myers

== H ==
- Heart of Innocence - Jessica Simpson
- He’s Alive (2004), Myers/McDonald - Richie McDonald
- Holding the Family Together - The Shoppe
- House of Pain – Andy Griggs

== I ==
- I Can't Wait - Marie Osmond, Stephen Craig
- I Don’t Know How (Not to Love You) - Uncle Kracker
- I Don't Feel Anything - Stephen Craig
- I Don't Want to Hate You Anymore, Myers/Loggins - Kenny Loggins
- I Don’t Wanna Say Goodbye - Kathie Lee Gifford
- I Got Mexico - Eddy Raven
- I Live, Baker/Myers/Malloy - Tim Rushlow
- I Love You Enough to Let You Go - Baker/Myers/Owen - Alabama
- I Still Believe in That (2011) - Bowers/Smith/Myers - Ash Bowers
- I Swear (1987), Baker/Myers - John Michael Montgomery (1993), All-4-One (1994), Kenny Rogers, and many others...
- I Turn to You, Myers/Kohen - Richie McDonald
- I Wanna Get to Ya, Baker/Myers/Malloy - Billy Gilman
- I Want My Life Back - Bucky Covington
- I Wonder What the Rich Folk Are Doin’ Tonight - Barbara Mandrell
- I'm Already There (2001), Baker/Myers/Mcdonald - Lonestar, Westlife
- I’m Here for You - Frank Myers, Billy Montana
- I'm Just Sayin - Matt Gary
- I’m Waiting for You - Alicia Elliott
- Ibiza, Myers/Raven - P.A.T, Thomas Erbrecht
- If Everyday Could Be Christmas - 98 Degrees, Lonestar, Richie McDonald
- If I Could Only Bring You Back - Joe Diffie
- If It’s Not One Thing It’s Another - Barbara Mandrell
- In Between – Hannah Sarah Tan
- In My Life – Stephen Craig
- Innocent Years - High Noon
- It's as Simple as That, Mcdonald/Baker/Myers - Lonestar

== L ==
- Last Train Running, B.Brandt/W.Brandt/Myers/Williams – Whiskey Falls
- Left, Leavin’, Goin’ or Gone, Myers/Pfrimmer - Noel Haggard, Doug Stone
- Life’s Too Short to Love This Fast, Baker/Myers/Owen - Alabama
- Living in Black and White, Lawrence/Baker/Myers - Tracy Lawrence
- Lonely at the Right Time, Myers/Pfrimmer - Tanya Tucker
- Long Stretch of Lonesome, Myers/Griggs/Montana – Andy Griggs
- Lost in Heaven - Alicia Elliott & Stephen Craig
- Love in Motion (Think About Us) - Ross Lewis
- Love Is Burning, Kees/Myers - Ricky Van Shelton
- Love Me Baby - The Pink Stilettos, Pop Stars Europe

== M ==
- Make a Miracle- Alabama & Various Artists
- Man af Steel – Whiskey Falls
- Measure of a Man - Richie McDonald
- Missed It Again - Anne West
- My Front Porch Looking In (2003), McDonald/Myers/Pfrimmer - Lonestar
- My Bad - Kate Bradshaw, Sofia-Sweden

== N ==
- Not Every Man Lives, Brice/Montana/Myers – Jason Aldean
- Nothing but the Radio, Myers/Teren - Joe Diffie
- Nothing’s Gonna Break My Love - Kate Bradshaw, Hasha(Latin)

== O ==
- Once Upon a Lifetime (1993), Baker/Myers - Alabama, Ronan Keating
- One Foot on the Street - Sylvia
- One Honest Heart (1998), Baker/Myers/Malloy - Reba McEntire
- Other Than Montreal - Eddy Raven

== R ==
- Right Here Waiting – Stephen Craig
- Risky Business - Eddy Raven
- Rocks and Honey - Bonnie Tyler
- Runaway - The Pink Stilettos, Pop Stars Europe

== S ==
- Sex Politics and Money - Stephan Craig
- She Doesn't Know - Stephan Craig
- She Loves Me - High Noon
- Silently Saying Good-Bye - Stephan Craig
- Simple as That, McDonald/Baker/Myers - Lonestar
- Slow Down – Richie McDonald
- Some Bridges Won’t Burn - Ross Lewis
- Someday Somewhere - Bradshaw/Myers- Kate Bradshaw / Liriel Domiciano(Spain)
- Someone Barrowed Someone Blue - Eddy Raven
- Sometimes a Lady - Eddy Raven
- Squeeze Me - Ronnie McDowell
- Standing Still - Kate Bradshaw
- Stay with Me Lord - Richie McDonald
- Stuck Myers/Billy Montana - Ash Bowers
- Sweet Contractions, Myers/Palmer - Rissi Palmer

== T ==
- T.L.C. A.S.A.P. (1993), Myers/Baker - Alabama
- That’s the Way We Roll – Crossin Dixon, Tim McDonald
- The Art of Getting By - Eddy Raven
- The Champ, B.Brandt/W.Brandt/Myers/Williams – Whiskey Falls
- The Days You Live For (2009), Kirby/Myers - Matt Gary
- The Game’s the Same - Earl Thomas Conley
- The Heart Never Forgets, Baker/Myers/Williams - LeAnn Rimes
- The House Won’t Rock, Myers/Miller - Sawyer Brown
- The Moment – Hal Ketchum
- The Road to You (1998), Tritt/Baker/Myers - Travis Tritt
- The Song I Said I’d Never Write For You - Eddy Raven
- The Trill - Kate Bradshaw
- These Arms - Baker & Myers, All-4-One
- Think About That - Richie McDonald
- This House - Richie McDonald
- This I Promise You - Ariel Rivera
- This Ole House - Razorback
- Those Days - Jim Glaser
- Till You Love Me - The McClymont Sisters
- Time – John David(Germany)
- Tomorrow (2011), Young/Myers/Smith - Chris Young

== U ==
- Untouchable – Cathy Briar (One Life To Live)

== V ==
- Vegas Love - Donny & Marie

== W ==
- We Got all Night - Matt Gary
- We Know Better Now - Dottie West
- What's Left of Me - Matt Gary
- What’s Up with That - Kate Bradshaw
- What’s Wrong with That, Pfrimmer/McDonald/Myers - Lonestar
- What I Miss the Most, Myers/Britt/McDonald - Lonestar
- What If It’s Me, Myers/Stone – Andy Griggs
- What Kind of Man (1995) - Marie Osmond
- What Say You (2004), Bradford/Myers - Travis Tritt, John Mellencamp
- What Would He Do - Richie McDonald
- When Night Falls- Bradshaw/Myers/Silverlight - Kate Bradshaw
- When Was the Last Time - Donna Ulisse
- Who’s Your Daddy – Mike Walker
- Why Santa's Fat - Richie McDonald
- Wonder Drug - Elli Erl
- Writing on the Wall - Anne West

== Y ==
- Years From Here- Baker & Myers, 4 P.M.
- You and I (1982), Myers - Eddie Rabbitt & Crystal Gayle
- You are My Life - Donny Osmond
- You Should Have Been Gone by Now - Eddy Raven
- You Should’ve Been There - The Shooters
- You're All I Ever Wanted - Vibe
- You're Never Too Old for Young Love - Eddy Raven
- YOU AND I - Park Bom
