= The Best of Eddy Raven =

Greatest hits album by Eddy Raven
- Released: February 1988
- Genre: Country
- Length: 32:55
- Label: RCA Victor
- Producer: Eddy Raven; Paul Worley; Don Gant; Barry Beckett

Eddy Raven chronology
Right Hand Man (1986)	The Best of Eddy Raven (1988)	Temporary Sanity (1989)

Singles from The Best of Eddy Raven
- 1. "I'm Gonna Get You" Released: January 1988; 2. "Joe Knows How to Live" Released: May 1988; 3. "'Til You Cry" Released: December 3, 1988

The Best of Eddy Raven is the first compilation album by American country music artist Eddy Raven. It was released in February 1988 by RCA Records. The album includes the singles "I'm Gonna Get You", "Joe Knows How to Live" and "'Til You Cry".

== Content ==
In addition to several of Raven's previous hit singles, the album contains three new tracks. These are "I'm Gonna Get You", "Joe Knows How to Live", and "'Til You Cry". All three were released as singles in 1988. The former two reached number one on the Billboard Hot Country Songs charts, while the latter peaked at number four. "I'm Gonna Get You" was previously a charted single for Billy Swan in 1987, while "Joe Knows How to Live" was previously cut by the Nitty Gritty Dirt Band on their album Hold On. Session keyboardist Barry Beckett produced these three songs. Prior to the recording, Beckett had contacted Raven and asked to produce songs for him. While Beckett had played keyboard on Raven's earlier albums, Raven said he was unaware at the time that Beckett also worked as a producer, and agreed to let him produce after discovering other songs he liked on which Beckett was a producer.

== Track listing ==
No.	Title	Writer(s)	Length
1.	"I Got Mexico"	Eddy Raven, Frank J. Myers	2:25
2.	"Operator, Operator"	Larry Willoughby, Janet Willoughby	3:04
3.	"I'm Gonna Get You"	Dennis Linde	2:46
4.	"Shine, Shine, Shine"	Ken Bell, Bud McGuire	3:26
5.	"'Til You Cry"	Steve Bogard, Rick Giles	3:52
6.	"Joe Knows How to Live"	Troy Seals, Max D. Barnes, Graham Lyle	3:44
7.	"Right Hand Man"	Gary Scruggs	3:01
8.	"Sometimes a Lady"	Raven, Myers	3:21
9.	"Go Against the Wind"	Raven	3:31
10.	"You Should Have Been Gone by Now"	Raven, Don Pfrimmer, Myers	3:25

== Chart performance ==
Chart (1988)	Peak position
US Top Country Albums (Billboard)	36
