= Solid as a Rock =

Studio album by The Shooters
- Released: April 11, 1989
- Genre: Country
- Label: Epic
- Producer: Walt Aldridge

The Shooters chronology
The Shooters (1987)	Solid as a Rock (1989)

Singles from Solid as a Rock
- 1. "Borderline" Released: October 1988; 2. "If I Ever Go Crazy" Released: February 1989; 3. "You Just Can't Lose 'Em All" Released: June 1989

Solid as a Rock is the second studio album by American country music group The Shooters. It was released on April 11, 1989 via Epic Records. The album includes the singles "Borderline", "If I Ever Go Crazy" and "You Just Can't Lose 'Em All".

== Track listing ==
All tracks are written by Walt Aldridge, except as noted.

No.	Title	Writer(s)	Length
1.	"Exception to the Rule"	Bucky Jones; Chris Waters; Tom Shapiro	3:07
2.	"If I Ever Go Crazy"		3:02
3.	"If It Hadn't Been So Good"		3:02
4.	"You Just Can't Lose 'Em All"		3:27
5.	"She's Steppin' Out"		3:50
6.	"Call It in the Air"		3:05
7.	"Borderline"		3:45
8.	"You Should've Been There"	Gary Baker	2:59
9.	"Leave and Learn"		3:47
10.	"If I Were You"	Billy Dean, Verlon Thompson	3:59

== Chart performance ==
=== Album ===
Chart (1989)	Peak position
Canada Country Albums (RPM)	23
US Top Country Albums (Billboard)	40

=== Singles ===
Year	Single	Peak chart positions	
Year	Single	US Country	CAN Country
1988	"Borderline"	13	21
1989	"If I Ever Go Crazy"	17	21
1989	"You Just Can't Lose 'Em All"	39	55
