= Temporary Sanity =

Studio album by Eddy Raven
- Released: May 1, 1989
- Recorded: 1988
- Genre: Country
- Label: Universal/Capitol Records
- Producer: Barry Beckett

Eddy Raven chronology
The Best of Eddy Raven (1988)	Temporary Sanity (1989)	Right for the Flight (1991)

Singles from Temporary Sanity
- 1. "In a Letter to You" Released: March 1989; 2. "Bayou Boys" Released: August 1989; 3. "Sooner or Later" Released: December 23, 1989; 4. "Island" Released: April 21, 1990; 5. "Zydeco Lady" Released: September 1990

Temporary Sanity is the eighth studio album by American country music singer Eddy Raven. It was released in 1989 by Universal Records.

== Content and reception ==
The album accounted for two number one singles on Hot Country Songs: "In a Letter to You" (a cover of Shakin' Stevens) and "Bayou Boys". Following these singles were "Sooner or Later" and "Island". The latter two were issued via Capitol Records, which acquired Universal in 1989.

Raven said of the album's sound that he wanted to add influences of Latin and Caribbean music to his sound, noting in particular the inclusion of steel drums on "Bayou Boys", and comparing "Zydeco Lady" to the sound of Miami Sound Machine. Jason Ankeny of Allmusic called the album a "mixed bag", referring to "Island" as a "moody ballad" but calling the sound of "Bayou Boys" "hamfisted".

== Track listing ==
No.	Title	Writer(s)	Length
1.	"Zydeco Lady"	Eddy Raven, Troy Seals	3:23
2.	"Holding On to You"	Walt Aldridge, Gary Baker, Susan Longacre	3:40
3.	"In a Letter to You"	Dennis Linde	3:15
4.	"Island"	Raven, Seals	3:58
5.	"Little Sheba"	Max Carl	4:38
6.	"Sooner or Later"	Longacre, Bill LaBounty, Beckie Foster	3:59
7.	"Bayou Boys"	Raven, Seals, Frank J. Myers	2:49
8.	"A Woman's Place"	Jim Weatherly, Jeff Tweel	3:28
9.	"Angel Fire"	Buck Moore, Mentor Williams	3:43
10.	"Risky Business"	Baker, Myers	3:40

== Personnel ==
Adapted from liner notes.

Musicians

- Eddie Bayers – drums
- Barry Beckett – keyboards
- Michael Black – background vocals
- Larry Byrom – acoustic guitar
- Paul Franklin – lap steel guitar
- Mitch Humphries – keyboards, synthesizers
- Mike Lawler – synthesizers
- Frank J. Myers – acoustic guitar
- Michael Rhodes – bass guitar
- Dennis Wilson – background vocals
- Curtis Young – background vocals
- Reggie Young – electric guitar

Technical

- Barry Beckett – producer
- Milan Bogdan – mastering
- Robb Earls – mixing assistant
- Scott Hendricks – recording, mixing
- John Hurley – recording assistant
- John Kunz – recording assistant
- Simon Levy – art direction
- Glenn Meadows – mastering
- Peter Nash – photography
- Willie Pevear – recording
- Tom Singers – recording assistant

== Chart performance ==
Chart (1988)	Peak position
US Top Country Albums (Billboard)	31
