= Rainbow Stew: Live at Anaheim Stadium =

Live album by Merle Haggard
- Released: July 1981
- Recorded: October 26, 1980
- Venue: Anaheim Stadium, Anaheim, California
- Genre: Country
- Length: 34:12
- Label: MCA
- Producer: Merle Haggard

Merle Haggard chronology
Back to the Barrooms (1980)	Rainbow Stew: Live at Anaheim Stadium (1981)	Songs for the Mama That Tried (1981)

Singles from Rainbow Stew: Live at Anaheim Stadium
- 1. "Rainbow Stew" Released: June 1981

Rainbow Stew: Live at Anaheim Stadium is a live album by American country music artist Merle Haggard with backing by The Strangers. It was recorded on October 26, 1980 in Anaheim, California and released in July 1981 on MCA Records.

Haggard’s performance was part of the 1980 Country Fall Festival held at Anaheim Stadium which also featured Willie Nelson, Alabama and Emmylou Harris.

== Background ==
In The Running Kind, Haggard biographer David Cantwell observes, "In the studio, these recent drinking numbers had broken a sweat trying to maintain control, but live they didn't even try to keep their cool, especially on fiddle breakdowns that run hot, then burst into flame."

The track "Dealin' with the Devil" was previously recorded by Eddy Raven on his 1980 album Eyes.

== Album artwork ==
The album cover features a fiddle and bow in the shape of the letter "A" with a gold halo on top which mirrored the California Angels logo and the landmark "Big A" sign from Anaheim Stadium.

== Critical reception ==
Professional ratings
Review scores
Source	Rating
Allmusic	3.5/5 stars

Allmusic critic Steven Thomas Erlewine calls the album "a wonderful, swinging album that brings a new spin not only to classics like 'I'm a Lonesome Fugitive' and 'Sing Me Back Home' but also to Hag's newer songs 'Misery and Gin,' 'I Think I'll Just Stay Here and Drink,' and the title track."

== Track listing ==
1. "Misery and Gin" (Johnny Durrill, Tommy Garrett) – 3:25
2. "I Think I'll Just Stay Here and Drink" (Merle Haggard) – 3:24
3. "Back to the Barrooms" (Haggard, Dave Kirby) – 2:24
4. "Our Paths May Never Cross" (Haggard) – 4:01
5. "Running Kind" (Haggard)/"I'm a Lonesome Fugitive" (Liz Anderson, Casey Anderson) – 3:35
6. "Rainbow Stew" (Haggard) – 2:43
7. "Blue Yodel No. 9 (Standin' on the Corner)" (Jimmie Rodgers) – 2:53
8. "Dealing with the Devil" (Eddy Raven, Sanger D. Shafer) – 3:45
9. "Fiddle Breakdown" – 3:48
10. "Sing Me Back Home" (Haggard) – 4:04

== Personnel ==
- Merle Haggard – vocals, guitar

The Strangers:

- Roy Nichols – lead guitar
- Norman Hamlet – steel guitar, dobro
- Tiny Moore – mandolin, fiddle
- Gordon Terry – fiddle
- Ronnie Reno – guitar
- Mark Yeary – piano
- Dennis Hromek – bass
- Biff Adam – drums
- Don Markham – saxophone

with

- Bonnie Owens – backing vocals

and

- Willie Nelson – guitar, vocals
- Johnny Paycheck – vocals
