= Borderline (The Shooters song) =

Single by The Shooters

from the album Solid as a Rock
- B-side: "She's Steppin' Out"
- Released: October 1988
- Genre: Country
- Length: 3:29
- Label: Epic
- Songwriter(s): Walt Aldridge
- Producer(s): Walt Aldridge

The Shooters singles chronology
"I Taught Her Everything She Knows About Love" (1988)	"Borderline" (1988)	"If I Ever Go Crazy" (1989)

"Borderline" is a song recorded by American country music group The Shooters. It was released in October 1988 as the first single from their album Solid as a Rock. The song peaked at number 13 on the Billboard Hot Country Singles chart. Lead vocalist Walt Aldridge wrote and produced the song.

== Chart performance ==
Chart (1988–1989)	Peak position
US Hot Country Songs (Billboard)	13
Canada Country Tracks (RPM)	21
