= I See Me =

Song recorded by Travis Tritt

Single by Travis Tritt

from the album My Honky Tonk History
- Released: March 5, 2005
- Genre: Country
- Length: 3:48
- Label: Columbia Nashville
- Songwriter(s): Casey Beathard, Chris Mohr
- Producer(s): Travis Tritt, Billy Joe Walker Jr.

Travis Tritt singles chronology
"What Say You" (2004)	"I See Me" (2005)	"You Never Take Me Dancing" (2007)

"I See Me" is a song recorded by American country music artist Travis Tritt. It was released in March 2005 as the third single from the album My Honky Tonk History. The song reached #32 on the Billboard Hot Country Singles & Tracks chart. The song was written by Casey Beathard and former NFL player Chris Mohr.

== Chart performance ==
Chart (2005)	Peak position
US Hot Country Songs (Billboard)	32
