= I'm Gonna Get You =

I'm Gonna Get You may refer to:

- I'm Gonna Get You (Billy Swan song), 1987, also released by Eddy Raven in 1988
- I'm Gonna Get You (Bizarre Inc song), 1992
- "I'm Gonna Get You (To Whom It May Concern)", a 1990 song by Snap! from World Power
