= If I Ever Go Crazy =

Single by The Shooters

from the album Solid as a Rock
- B-side: "Leave and Learn"
- Released: February 1989
- Genre: Country
- Label: Epic
- Songwriters: Walt Aldridge; Sheila Aldridge
- Producer: Walt Aldridge

The Shooters singles chronology
"Borderline" (1988)	"If I Ever Go Crazy" (1989)	"You Just Can't Lose 'Em All" (1989)

"If I Ever Go Crazy" is a song recorded by American country music group The Shooters. It was released in February 1989 as the second single from their album Solid as a Rock. The song peaked at number 17 on the Billboard Hot Country Singles chart and reached number 21 on the RPM Country Tracks chart in Canada. The song was written by the band's lead vocalist Walt Aldridge and his wife, Sheila.

== Chart performance ==
Chart (1989)	Peak position
Canada Country Singles (RPM)	21
US Hot Country Songs (Billboard)	17
