= My Honky Tonk History =

Studio album by Travis Tritt
- Released: August 17, 2004
- Recorded: 2003
- Genre: Country
- Length: 40:58
- Label: Columbia Nashville
- Producer: Travis Tritt; Billy Joe Walker, Jr.

Travis Tritt chronology
Strong Enough (2002)	My Honky Tonk History (2004)	The Very Best of Travis Tritt (2007)

Singles from My Honky Tonk History
- 1. "The Girl's Gone Wild" Released: May 8, 2004; 2. "What Say You" Released: August 30, 2004; 3. "I See Me" Released: March 5, 2005

Professional ratings
Review scores
Source	Rating
About.com	4/5 stars
Allmusic	3.5/5 stars
Billboard	(favorable)
People	3.5/4 stars

My Honky Tonk History is the American country music artist Travis Tritt's ninth studio album, released on Columbia Records in 2004. It features the singles "The Girl's Gone Wild", "What Say You" (feat. John Mellencamp), and "I See Me", which peaked at #28, #21 and #32 on the Hot Country Songs charts, respectively. The duet was Mellencamp's first Top 40 entry on the country charts.

The track "Circus Leaving Town" was previously recorded by its writer, Philip Claypool, on his 1995 debut album A Circus Leaving Town. Claypool's version of the song peaked at #70 on the country charts that year.

== Track listing ==
CD
No.	Title	Writer(s)	Duet partner(s)	Length
1.	"Honky-Tonk History"	Luke Bryan, Patrick Jason Matthews		3:35
2.	"Too Far to Turn Around"	Cory Mayo, Jon McElroy, Gretchen Wilson		3:25
3.	"The Girl's Gone Wild"	Bob DiPiero, Rivers Rutherford		2:49
4.	"What Say You"	Michael Bradford, Frank J. Myers	John Mellencamp	3:54
5.	"Circus Leaving Town"	Philip Claypool		4:08
6.	"Monkey Around"	Delbert McClinton, Benmont Tench, Gary Nicholson		3:13
7.	"I See Me"	Casey Beathard, Chris Mohr		3:48
8.	"When Good Ol' Boys Go Bad"	Kendell Marvel, Philip O'Donnell		2:58
9.	"We've Had It All"	Travis Tritt, Marty Stuart		3:19
10.	"It's All About the Money"	Jody Harris, Donny Kees		3:28
11.	"Small Doses"	Jerry Salley, Chris Stapleton		5:18
12.	"When in Rome"	Marvel, Rutherford, Boyd Houston Robert		6:23
Total length:				46:18

== Personnel ==
As listed in liner notes.

- Mike Brignardello – bass guitar
- Pat Buchanan – electric guitar
- Tom Bukovac – electric guitar
- Lisa Cochran – background vocals
- Tammy Cochran – background vocals
- John Cowan – background vocals
- Melodie Crittenden – background vocals
- Eric Darken – percussion, cowbell, vibraphone
- Amber Dotson – background vocals
- Dan Dugmore – steel guitar, Dobro
- Béla Fleck – banjo on "What Say You"
- Larry Franklin – fiddle, mandolin
- Rob Hajacos – fiddle
- Wes Hightower – background vocals
- Jim Hoke – harmonica
- John Barlow Jarvis – piano, Hammond organ, synthesizer
- Eddie Kilgallon – background vocals
- Brent Mason – electric guitar
- John Mellencamp – duet vocals on "What Say You"
- Greg Morrow – drums, percussion, tambourine
- Richard Richardson – background vocals
- Hargus "Pig" Robbins – piano, Hammond organ, synthesizer
- John Wesley Ryles – background vocals
- Neil Thrasher – background vocals
- Travis Tritt – lead vocals, background vocals
- Robby Turner – steel guitar, Dobro
- Billy Joe Walker Jr. – acoustic guitar, electric guitar, gut string guitar
- Biff Watson – acoustic guitar
- Joy Lynn White – background vocals
- Hurshel Wiginton – background vocals
- Gretchen Wilson – background vocals
- Reggie Young – electric guitar, electric sitar
- Jonathan Yudkin – banjo

Strings on "I See Me" performed by the Nashville String Machine and arranged by D. Bergen White.

== Chart performance ==
Chart (2004)	Peak position
U.S. Billboard Top Country Albums	7
U.S. Billboard 200	50
