= Love and Other Hard Times =

Studio album by Eddy Raven
- Released: 1985
- Genre: Country
- Label: RCA Victor
- Producer: Eddy Raven; Paul Worley

Eddy Raven chronology
I Could Use Another You (1984)	Love and Other Hard Times (1985)	Right Hand Man (1986)

Singles from Love and Other Hard Times
- 1. "Operator, Operator" Released: April 20, 1985; 2. "I Wanna Hear It from You" Released: August 3, 1985; 3. "You Should Have Been Gone by Now" Released: December 67, 1985

Love and Other Hard Times is the sixth studio album by American country music singer Eddy Raven. It was released in 1985 by RCA Records.

== Content and reception ==
Three singles from the album made the Hot Country Songs charts: "Operator, Operator", "I Wanna Hear It from You", and "You Should Have Been Gone by Now".

Cash Box reviewed the album positively, stating that it was "another exhibition of his fine vocal range and his valuable songwriting ability." Billboard also published a positive review of the album, which said that his "haunting and sincere voice is matched here by some of the best material he's recorded in recent years."

== Track listing ==
No.	Title	Writer(s)	Length
1.	"I Wanna Hear It from You"	Nancy Montgomery, Rick Giles	3:18
2.	"Room to Run"	Eddy Raven, Dave Powelson	2:59
3.	"You Should Have Been Gone by Now"	Raven, Don Pfrimmer, Frank J. Myers	3:24
4.	"Easy Time"	Raven, Powelson	3:10
5.	"Changes"	Raven, Myers, Tanya Tucker	3:39
6.	"Operator, Operator"	Larry Willoughby, Janet Willoughby	3:04
7.	"We Robbed Trains"	Raven	4:17
8.	"The Song I Said I'd Never Write for You"	Raven, Myers, Powelson	3:57
9.	"The Art of Getting By"	Myers, Steve Dean	3:24
10.	"I'm Just Someone You Run From"	Raven, A.L. "Doodle" Owens	2:37

== Personnel ==
- Eddie Bayers - drums
- Barry Beckett - keyboards
- Dennis Burnside - keyboards, synthesizer
- Don Gant - background vocals
- Sonny Garrish - steel guitar
- David Innis - synthesizer
- Frank J. Myers - acoustic guitar, electric guitar
- Mark O'Connor - fiddle, mandolin
- Joe Osborn - bass guitar
- Eddy Raven - lead vocals
- James Stroud - drums
- Dennis Wilson - background vocals
- Paul Worley - acoustic guitar, electric guitar
- Reggie Young - electric guitar

== Chart performance ==
Chart (1985)	Peak position
US Top Country Albums (Billboard)	64
