= Right Hand Man (album) =

Studio album by Eddy Raven
- Released: 1986
- Genre: Country
- Label: RCA Victor
- Producer: Eddy Raven; Don Gant (except "Sometimes a Lady"); Paul Worley ("Sometimes a Lady" only)

Eddy Raven chronology
Love and Other Hard Times (1985)	Right Hand Man (1986)	The Best of Eddy Raven (1988)

Singles from Right Hand Man
- 1. "Sometimes a Lady" Released: May 31, 1986; 2. "Right Hand Man" Released: November 15, 1986; 3. "You're Never Too Old for Young Love" Released: March 28, 1987; 4. "Shine, Shine, Shine" Released: August 3, 1987

Right Hand Man is the seventh studio album by American country music singer Eddy Raven. It was released in 1986 by RCA Records.

== Content and reception ==
Four singles from the album made the Hot Country Songs charts: "Sometimes a Lady", the title track, "You're Never Too Old for Young Love", and "Shine, Shine, Shine", the last of which made it to the number 1 position on that chart in 1987.

Alanna Nash wrote in Stereo Review that the album seemed to focus more on Raven's singing over his songwriting, noting that the album had more of a country pop sound than its predecessors.

== Track listing ==
No.	Title	Writer(s)	Length
1.	"Shine, Shine, Shine"	Ken Bell, Bud McGuire	3:23
2.	"The Best of Them"	Gary Burr	3:44
3.	"Sometimes a Lady"	Eddy Raven, Frank J. Myers	3:19
4.	"Right Hand Man"	Gary Scruggs	2:55
5.	"Neon Row"	Donny Kees, Jimmy Jay	3:59
6.	"You're Never Too Old for Young Love"	Rick Giles, Myers	2:35
7.	"Crime of the Century"	Burr	2:35
8.	"Other Than Montreal"	Raven, Myers	2:48
9.	"Stay with Me"	Ricky Ray Rector, Donny Kees	3:01
10.	"But She Loves Me"	Jerry Fuller	2:52

== Personnel ==
- Eddie Bayers - drums
- Barry Beckett - piano
- Dennis Burnside - keyboards, synthesizer
- Don Gant - background vocals
- Jim Horn - saxophone
- Mike Lawler - keyboards, synthesizer
- Frank J. Myers - acoustic guitar
- Joe Osborn - bass guitar
- Eddy Raven - lead vocals
- Bergen White - background vocals
- Dennis Wilson - background vocals
- Paul Worley - acoustic guitar
- Reggie Young - electric guitar

== Chart performance ==
Chart (1986)	Peak position
US Top Country Albums (Billboard)	18
