= The Girl's Gone Wild =

Single by Travis Tritt

from the album My Honky Tonk History
- Released: May 8, 2004
- Genre: Country
- Length: 2:49
- Label: Columbia Nashville
- Songwriter(s): Bob DiPiero, Rivers Rutherford
- Producer(s): Travis Tritt, Billy Joe Walker Jr.

Travis Tritt singles chronology
"Lonesome, On'ry and Mean" (2003)	"The Girl's Gone Wild" (2004)	"What Say You" (2004)

"The Girl's Gone Wild" is a song recorded by American country music artist Travis Tritt. It was released in May 2004 as the first single from the album My Honky Tonk History. The song reached #28 on the Billboard Hot Country Singles & Tracks chart. The song was written by Bob DiPiero and Rivers Rutherford.

== Chart performance ==
Chart (2004)	Peak position
US Hot Country Songs (Billboard)	28
