= Randy Cornor =

American country music singer-songwriter (1954–2022)

- Born: July 28, 1954
- Origin: Houston, Texas, U.S.
- Died: March 24, 2022 (aged 67)
- Genres: Country
- Occupation(s): Singer, songwriter, guitarist
- Instrument(s): Vocals, guitar
- Years active: 1967–1981

Randy Cornor (July 28, 1954 – March 24, 2022) was an American country music singer, songwriter, and guitarist. He is known primarily for his work in the field of country music.

== Biography ==
Cornor was born and raised in Deer Park, Texas, a suburb of Houston. He began playing guitar professionally at the age of 13, first for Gene Watson, then later for Frenchie Burke. During his tour years with Watson, he mastered the pedal steel, banjo, fiddle and harmonica. He next worked as a session musician, and soon got a recording contract of his own. His first ABC/Dot single, "Sometimes I Talk in My Sleep" from My First Album, reached Number 9 on the Billboard Hot Country Singles chart. Two other singles from the album, Heart Don't Fail Me Now and Love Doesn't Live Here Anymore, also charted. Both "Sometimes I Talk in My Sleep" and "I Guess You Never Loved Me Anyway" were written by Eddy Raven.

== Discography ==
- My First Album (1975, ABC Dot 2048)

Year	Single	Peak positions	Album
Year	Single	US Country	Album
1975	"Sometimes I Talk in My Sleep"	9	My First Album
1976	"Heart Don't Fail Me Now"	33	My First Album
1976	"I Guess You Never Loved Me Anyway"	72	—
1977	"Love Doesn't Live Here Anymore"	86	My First Album
1978	"Ring Telephone Ring (Damn Telephone)"	95	—
1978	"Hurt as Big as Texas"	100	—

=== As sideman ===
- Freddy Fender: Before the Next Teardrop Falls (1974, ABC Dot DOSD-2020)
- Freddy Fender: Are You Ready For Freddy? (1975, ABC Dot DOSD-2044)
- Rod Bernard Night Lights And Love Songs (1975, Jin Records 9010)
- Kenny Dale Red Hot Memory (1978, Capitol Records ST-11762)
- Frenchie Burke Knock Knock Knock (1978, Cherry Records CA4781)
- Mundo Earwood Heartspun (1979, General Music Co. GMCLP-001)
- Hadley J. Castille Avec Son Violin Cajun Presente Les Chansons Traditional De La Louisiane (1981, Kajun 5010)
