= I Could Use Another You =

Studio album by Eddy Raven
- Released: 1984
- Genre: Country
- Label: RCA Victor
- Producer: Eddy Raven; Paul Worley

Eddy Raven chronology
Desperate Dreams (1981)	I Could Use Another You (1984)	Love and Other Hard Times (1985)

Singles from I Could Use Another You
- 1. "I Got Mexico" Released: February 1984; 2. "I Could Use Another You" Released: June 21, 1984; 3. "She's Gonna Win Your Heart" Released: November 10, 1984

I Could Use Another You is the fifth studio album by American country music singer Eddy Raven. It was released by RCA Records in June 1984. The album contains the singles "I Got Mexico", "I Could Use Another You", and "She's Gonna Win Your Heart".

== Content and reception ==
The album was one of the first production credits for Paul Worley, then primarily known for his work as a session guitarist. The album accounted for three singles on the Hot Country Songs charts: "I Got Mexico", which was Raven's first number 1 hit there, followed by the title track and "She's Gonna Win Your Heart".

Cash Box magazine described the title track as "an upbeat tune stressing Raven’s clear, distinct vocals." Writing for Stereo Review magazine (now known as Sound & Vision), Alanna Nash noted that while it had fewer songs written by Raven and a "slightly more mainstream" sound than its predecessors, the album was "well up to his own high standards", while also considering Raven's singing more upbeat and confident than on previous efforts.

== Track listing ==
No.	Title	Writer(s)	Length
1.	"I Got Mexico"	Eddy Raven, Frank J. Myers	2:27
2.	"Keeper of the Flame"	Jerry McBee, Stewart Harris	3:14
3.	"Solo Sometimes"	Don Cook, Bill LaBounty	3:16
4.	"Someone Borrowed, Someone Blue"	Steve Dean, Myers, David Hungate	3:06
5.	"She's Gonna Win Your Heart"	Billy Burnette, Mentor Williams	3:15
6.	"I Could Use Another You"	Chris Waters, Bucky Jones, Tom Shapiro	2:48
7.	"Just for the Sake of the Thrill"	Raven	3:02
8.	"Love Burning Down"	Ron David Moore, Doug Hauseman	3:40
9.	"Looking for Ways"	Raven	3:27
10.	"Folks Out on the Road"	Raven, Myers, David Powelson	2:53

== Personnel ==
Adapted from liner notes.

Musicians

- Eddie Bayers - drums
- Dennis Burnside - keyboards, synthesizer
- Don Gant - background vocals
- Shane Keister - synthesizer
- Frank J. Myers - acoustic guitar
- Joe Osborn - bass guitar (all tracks except 5)
- Larry Paxton - bass guitar (track 5)
- Eddy Raven - lead vocals
- James Stroud - drums
- Dennis Wilson - background vocals
- Paul Worley - electric guitar, acoustic guitar
- Reggie Young - electric guitar

Technical

- Barnes & Co. - album graphics
- George Clinton - assistant engineer
- Lee Groltzsch - assistant engineer
- Hollis Halford - assistant engineer
- Vicki Hicks - assistant engineer
- Deb Mahalanobis - album design and lettering
- Randy Martin - illustration
- Glenn Meadows - mastering
- Marshall Morgan - engineer, mixing
- Eric Prestidge - engineer, mixing
- Eddy Raven - producer
- Joe Scaife - engineer
- Mark Tucker - photography
- Paul Worley - producer

== Chart performance ==
Chart (1984)	Peak position
US Top Country Albums (Billboard)	41
