= Back to the Barrooms =

Studio album by Merle Haggard
- Released: October 10, 1980
- Recorded: June 1980, Nashville, TN
- Genre: Country
- Length: 35:34
- Label: MCA 5139
- Producer: Jimmy Bowen (all tracks except 1), Snuff Garrett (track 1)

Merle Haggard chronology
The Way I Am (1980)	Back to the Barrooms (1980)	Rainbow Stew Live at Anaheim Stadium (1981)

Singles from Back to the Barrooms
- 1. "Misery and Gin" Released: June 16, 1980; 2. "I Think I'll Just Stay Here and Drink" Released: October 25, 1980; 3. "Leonard" Released: February 14, 1981

Back to the Barrooms is the thirty-first studio album by American country music singer Merle Haggard, released in October 1980. He is backed by Norm Hamlet and Don Markham of The Strangers.

== Background ==
As the title suggests, Back to the Barrooms features some of Haggard's hardest drinking songs since his early honky-tonk classics "Swinging Doors" and "The Bottle Let Me Down." "I Think I'll Just Stay Here and Drink," his only solo #1 hit at MCA, features an extended jam unusual for a country single at the time, consisting of Larry Muhobarec on piano, Don Markham on saxophone, and Reggie Young on guitar. The self-explanatory "I Don't Want To Sober Up Tonight" and the title track are also unabashed odes to getting drunk. The single "Misery and Gin" had appeared on the soundtrack to the film Bronco Billy, in which Haggard had a cameo role, appearing as himself. A music video was also made for the song.

"Leonard" is Haggard's tribute to his friend and mentor Tommy Collins. Haggard had been recording songs written by Collins throughout his career, beginning with the novelty "Sam Hill" in 1964 and scoring a #1 single with "Carolyn" in 1971. Collins, who had never heard the song, was in the studio the day Haggard cut it and, as he tells Daniel Cooper in the liner notes to the 1994 box set Down Every Road, he was overwhelmed: "It's hard to describe how you feel when you first fall in love, it's hard to explain how you feel when you become the father of a child. It's one of those things it's hard to explain. I was very honored, and very humbled by the fact that he did that." The song became a Top 10 hit.

Other notable tracks include "(I Don't Have) Any More Love Songs", which is a Hank Williams, Jr. song from his 1979 Whiskey Bent and Hell Bound, and "Can't Break the Habit," a song co-authored by Haggard and his third wife Leona Williams. Haggard and Williams, who married in 1978, began having troubles around this time and their divorce would begin Haggard's long descent into alcoholism and cocaine addiction.

"Easy Come, Easy Go" is a cover of a song by The Sutherland Brothers from their 1979 album, When the Night Comes Down.

== Critical reception ==
Professional ratings
Review scores
Source	Rating
AllMusic	4.5/5 stars

The LP was released in October 1980 and reached number 8 on the Billboard country albums chart. Thom Jurek of AllMusic insists that Back to the Barrooms "is really about is the wreckage caused by broken amorous relationships and boozy escape as the only way to cope." Calling it his strongest album on MCA, Jurek compliments Jimmy Bowen's "progressive country style" and calls it Haggard's "most consistent, inspiring performance since he left Capitol, and was the beginning of a creative renaissance, though the personal toll it took on him would prove considerable."

== Track listing ==
All tracks composed by Merle Haggard; except where indicated

1. "Misery and Gin" (John Durrill, Snuff Garrett) – 2:50
2. "Back to the Barrooms Again" (Merle Haggard, Dave Kirby) – 2:34
3. "Make-Up and Faded Blue Jeans" – 4:05
4. "Ever-Changing Woman" (Dave Kirby, Curly Putman) – 2:28
5. "Easy Come, Easy Go" (Iain Sutherland) – 3:32
6. "I Don't Want to Sober Up Tonight" – 3:30
7. "Can't Break the Habit" (Haggard, Leona Williams) – 3:04
8. "Our Paths May Never Cross" – 2:44
9. "(I Don't Have) Any More Love Songs" (Hank Williams Jr.) – 3:04
10. "Leonard" – 3:39
11. "I Think I'll Just Stay Here and Drink" – 4:31

== Personnel ==
- Merle Haggard – lead vocals, harmony vocals, acoustic guitar
- Norm Hamlet – pedal steel guitar, dobro
- Don Markham – trumpet, saxophone
- Johnny Gimble – fiddle, mandolin
- Billy Joe Walker, Jr. – acoustic guitar, electric guitar
- Reggie Young – electric guitar
- Larry Muhoberac – keyboards
- Joe Osborn – bass guitar
- Jerry Kroon – drums
- Larrie Londin – drums
- Dennis William Wilson – harmony vocals

Strings on "Misery and Gin" arranged and conducted by Steve Dorff

== Production notes ==
- Produced by Jimmy Bowen (all tracks except 1), Snuff Garrett (track 1)
- Engineered by Grover Helsley, Jimmy Bowen, Ron Treat

== Charts ==
=== Weekly charts ===
Chart (1981)	Peak position
US Top Country Albums (Billboard)	8

=== Year-end charts ===
Chart (1981)	Position
US Top Country Albums (Billboard)	16
