= Baker & Myers =

American country music duo

- Origin: United States
- Genre: Country
- Years active: 1994–1995
- Label: MCG/Curb
- Past members: Gary Baker; Frank J. Myers

Baker & Myers was an American country music duo composed of singer-songwriters Gary Baker and Frank J. Myers, who first worked as songwriters for other country music artists; one of their most notable compositions is John Michael Montgomery's 1994 crossover hit "I Swear", which won the Grammy Award for Best Country song a year later; this song was later recorded by pop group All-4-One as well.

Also in 1995, they recorded one studio album for MCG/Curb Records as the duo Baker & Myers; this album produced three minor singles on the Billboard Hot Country Singles & Tracks (now Hot Country Songs) charts. Although they have not recorded any subsequent albums or songs, both Baker and Myers continue to write hit singles.

== Biography ==
Frank Myers first met Gary Baker in the 1980s while working for Eddy Raven. The two began playing together in 1990 for Marie Osmond after Baker's previous band called The Shooters disbanded. It was during this time that Myers and Baker's songwriting flourished. They achieved their first hit single together in 1993 with the song "Once Upon a Lifetime", which was recorded by Alabama.

In 1987, Myers teamed up with Gary Baker to write the song "I Swear". The song remained unrecorded for six years, until John Michael Montgomery recorded it in 1993. Montgomery's version went on to become a Number One single on the country charts; in addition, it netted a Grammy Award for Best Country Song. Pop group All-4-One later enjoyed tremendous crossover success with the same song by taking the song to No. 1 on the Pop charts where it stayed for 11 weeks.

Shortly afterward, Frank and Gary were signed to MCG/Curb Records as the duo Baker & Myers. A self-titled debut album was released in 1995 on the label, producing three minor chart singles on the Billboard Hot Country Singles & Tracks (now Hot Country Songs) charts. It became a 3-time nominee for Duo of the Year at the ACM's and CMA's. Although they never recorded after the release of that album, both Baker and Myers have continued their careers as songwriters.

In 2002, they co-wrote "I'm Already There" for Lonestar. A Number One hit on the country music charts for six weeks, it was also declared 2002's Country Song of the year by BMI.

== Discography ==
=== Albums ===
Title	Album details
Baker & Myers	Release date: October 10, 1995; Label: MCG/Curb Records

=== Singles ===
Year	Single	Peak positions	Album
Year	Single	US Country	Album
1995	"These Arms"	67	Baker & Myers
1996	"Years from Here"	48	Baker & Myers
1996	"A Little Bit of Honey"	71	Baker & Myers

=== Music videos ===
Year	Video	Director
1995	"These Arms"	
1996	"Years from Here"	Jeffrey Phillips
