= Leonard (song) =

Single by Merle Haggard

from the album Back to the Barrooms
- B-side: "Our Paths May Never Cross"
- Released: February 14, 1981
- Genre: Country
- Length: 3:38
- Label: MCA
- Songwriter(s): Merle Haggard
- Producer(s): Jimmy Bowen

Merle Haggard singles chronology
"I Think I'll Just Stay Here and Drink" (1980)	"Leonard" (1981)	"Rainbow Stew" (1981)

"Leonard" is a song written and recorded by American country music artist Merle Haggard. It was released in February 1981 as the third single from the album Back to the Barrooms. The song reached No. 9 on the Billboard Hot Country Singles & Tracks chart.

== Content ==
The song is a tribute to songwriter Tommy Collins, and Merle references his band The Strangers in the lyrics.

== Chart performance ==
Chart (1981)	Peak position
US Hot Country Songs (Billboard)	9
Canadian RPM Country Tracks	7
