= Rainbow Stew =

Single by Merle Haggard

from the album Rainbow Stew: Live at Anaheim Stadium
- B-side: "Blue Yodel No. 9 (Standin' on the Corner)"
- Released: June 1, 1981
- Genre: Country
- Length: 2:43
- Label: MCA
- Songwriter: Merle Haggard
- Producer: Merle Haggard

Merle Haggard singles chronology
"Leonard" (1981)	"Rainbow Stew" (1981)	"My Favorite Memory" (1981)

"Rainbow Stew" is a song written and recorded live by American country music artist Merle Haggard backed by The Strangers. It was released in June 1981 as the lead single from the live album Rainbow Stew: Live at Anaheim Stadium. The song reached No. 4 on the Billboard Hot Country Singles & Tracks chart.

== Chart performance ==
Chart (1981)	Peak position
US Hot Country Songs (Billboard)	4
Canadian RPM Country Tracks	17
