= I Should've Called =

Single by Eddy Raven

from the album Desperate Dreams
- B-side: "Young Girl"
- Released: May 23, 1981
- Genre: Country
- Length: 3:09
- Label: Elektra
- Songwriter(s): Eddy Raven
- Producer(s): Jimmy Bowen

Eddy Raven singles chronology
"Peace of Mind" (1980)	"I Should've Called" (1981)	"Who Do You Know in California" (1981)

"I Should've Called" is a song written and recorded by American country music artist Eddy Raven. It was released in May 1981 as the first single from the album Desperate Dreams. The song reached #13 on the Billboard Hot Country Singles & Tracks chart.

== Chart performance ==
Chart (1981)	Peak position
US Hot Country Songs (Billboard)	13
