= Misery and Gin =

Single by Merle Haggard

from the album Back to the Barrooms
- B-side: "No One to Sing For (But the Band)"
- Released: June 16, 1980
- Recorded: May 9, 1980
- Genre: Country
- Length: 2:45
- Label: MCA
- Songwriters: Snuff Garrett; John Durrill
- Producer: Snuff Garrett

Merle Haggard singles chronology
| "Bar Room Buddies" (1980) | "Misery and Gin" (1980) | "I Think I'll Just Stay Here and Drink" (1980) |

"Misery and Gin" is a song written by Snuff Garrett and John Durrill, and recorded by American country music artist Merle Haggard. It was written specifically for inclusion in the 1980 movie, Bronco Billy, and released as a single in June 1980. It was co-released both on the Bronco Billy soundtrack album and Haggard's studio album, Back to the Barrooms. "Misery and Gin" reached number 3 on the Billboard Hot Country Singles & Tracks chart and peaked at number 4 on the Canadian RPM Country Tracks.

== Content ==
The narrator discusses how he always ends up at the bar trying to drink away memories. The narrator goes on to say how the alcohol makes memories come back to haunt him.

== Chart performance ==
| Chart (1980) | Peak position |
|---|---|
| US Hot Country Songs (Billboard) | 3 |
| Canadian RPM Country Tracks | 4 |
