= What Say You =

Single by Travis Tritt with John Mellencamp

from the album My Honky Tonk History
- Released: August 30, 2004
- Genre: Country
- Length: 3:54
- Label: Columbia Nashville
- Songwriter(s): Michael Bradford, Frank J. Myers
- Producer(s): Travis Tritt, Billy Joe Walker Jr.

Travis Tritt singles chronology
"The Girl's Gone Wild" (2004)	"What Say You" (2004)	"I See Me" (2005)

John Mellencamp singles chronology
"Walk Tall" (2004)	"What Say You" (2004)	"Our Country" (2006)

"What Say You" is a song recorded by American country music artist Travis Tritt featuring John Mellencamp. It was released in August 2004 as the second single from Tritt's album My Honky Tonk History. The song reached No. 21 on the Billboard Hot Country Songs chart. The song was written by Michael Bradford and Frank J. Myers.

== Chart performance ==
Chart (2004)	Peak position
US Bubbling Under Hot 100 Singles (Billboard)	17
US Hot Country Songs (Billboard)	21
