= Island (song) =

Single by Eddy Raven

from the album Temporary Sanity
- B-side: "A Woman's Place"
- Released: April 21, 1990
- Genre: Country
- Length: 3:58
- Label: Capitol Nashville
- Songwriters: Eddy Raven, Troy Seals
- Producer: Barry Beckett

Eddy Raven singles chronology
"Sooner or Later" (1990)	"Island" (1990)	"Zydeco Lady" (1990)

"Island" is a song co-written and recorded by American country music artist Eddy Raven. It was released in April 1990 as the fourth single from the album Temporary Sanity. The song reached #10 on the Billboard Hot Country Singles & Tracks chart. It was written by Raven and Troy Seals.

== Chart performance ==
Chart (1990)	Peak position
Canada Country Singles (RPM)	6
US Hot Country Songs (Billboard)	10

=== Year-end charts ===
Chart (1990)	Position
Canada Country Tracks (RPM)	80
