= Right Hand Man (Eddy Raven song) =

Single by Eddy Raven

from the album Right Hand Man
- B-side: "I Got Mexico"
- Released: November 15, 1986
- Genre: Country rock, country pop
- Length: 3:01
- Label: RCA
- Songwriter(s): Gary Scruggs
- Producer(s): Don Gant, Eddy Raven

Eddy Raven singles chronology
"Sometimes a Lady" (1986)	"Right Hand Man" (1986)	"You're Never Too Old for Young Love" (1987)

"Right Hand Man" is a song written by Gary Scruggs, and recorded by American country music artist Eddy Raven. It was released in November 1986 as the second single and title track from the album Right Hand Man. The song reached #3 on the Billboard Hot Country Singles & Tracks chart.

== Charts ==
=== Weekly charts ===
Chart (1986–1987)	Peak position
US Hot Country Songs (Billboard)	3
Canadian RPM Country Tracks	5

=== Year-end charts ===
Chart (1987)	Position
US Hot Country Songs (Billboard)	41
