= I Think I'll Just Stay Here and Drink =

Single by Merle Haggard

from the album Back to the Barrooms
- B-side: "Back to the Barrooms Again"
- Released: October 25, 1980
- Genre: Country
- Length: 4:31
- Label: MCA
- Songwriter(s): Merle Haggard
- Producer(s): Jimmy Bowen

Merle Haggard singles chronology
| "Misery and Gin" (1980) | "I Think I'll Just Stay Here and Drink" (1980) | "Leonard" (1981) |

"I Think I'll Just Stay Here and Drink" is a song written and recorded by American country music artist Merle Haggard. It was released in October 1980 as the second single from the album Back to the Barrooms. The song was Haggard's twenty-sixth No. 1 country hit, and stayed at the top position for one week and spent a total of twelve weeks on the country chart. It features a memorable saxophone solo by Don Markham of The Strangers. The song was covered by Warrant on their 2017 album Louder Harder Faster.

== Chart performance ==
| Chart (1980–1981) | Peak position |
|---|---|
| US Hot Country Songs (Billboard) | 1 |
| Canadian RPM Country Tracks | 29 |
