= Shine, Shine, Shine =

Single by Eddy Raven

from the album Right Hand Man
- B-side: "Stay with Me"
- Released: August 3, 1987
- Genre: Country
- Length: 3:29
- Label: RCA
- Songwriters: Ken Bell; Bud McGuire
- Producers: Don Gant, Eddy Raven

Eddy Raven singles chronology
| "You're Never Too Old for Young Love" (1987) | "Shine, Shine, Shine" (1987) | "I'm Gonna Get You" (1988) |

"Shine, Shine, Shine" is a song written by Ken Bell and Bud McGuire, and originally recorded by Razzy Bailey on his 1985 album Arrival. American country music artist Eddy Raven released the song in August 1987 as the fourth single from his album Right Hand Man. The song was Raven's second number one country single, his first since "I Got Mexico" three years before. The single went to number one for one week and spent a total of thirteen weeks on the country chart.

== Charts ==
=== Weekly charts ===
| Chart (1987) | Peak position |
|---|---|
| US Hot Country Songs (Billboard) | 1 |
| Canadian RPM Country Tracks | 1 |

=== Year-end charts ===
| Chart (1987) | Position |
|---|---|
| US Hot Country Songs (Billboard) | 49 |
