= Who Do You Know in California =

Single by Eddy Raven

from the album Desperate Dreams
- B-side: "Thinking It Over"
- Released: October 17, 1981
- Genre: Country
- Length: 2:49
- Label: Elektra
- Songwriter(s): Eddy Raven
- Producer(s): Jimmy Bowen

Eddy Raven singles chronology
"I Should've Called" (1981)	"Who Do You Know in California" (1981)	"A Little Bit Crazy" (1982)

"Who Do You Know in California" is a song written and recorded by American country music artist Eddy Raven. It was released in October 1981 as the second single from the album Desperate Dreams. The song reached #11 on the Billboard Hot Country Singles & Tracks chart.

== Content ==
The song is about a marital affair with a woman in California which is unveiled when the mistress in the situation calls the narrator's wife, after which the wife questions the narrator with the song's title. No resolution is given to the song's question. According to Raven, he originally wanted to title the song "Who Do You Know in Dallas", but he felt that "California" fit the song's meter better.

== Chart performance ==
Chart (1981–1982)	Peak position
US Hot Country Songs (Billboard)	11
