= A Little Bit Crazy =

Single by Eddy Raven

from the album Desperate Dreams
- B-side: "Loving Arms and Lying Eyes"
- Released: February 20, 1982
- Genre: Country
- Length: 2:17
- Label: Elektra
- Songwriter(s): Eddy Raven
- Producer(s): Jimmy Bowen

Eddy Raven singles chronology
"Who Do You Know in California" (1981)	"A Little Bit Crazy" (1982)	"She's Playing Hard to Forget" (1982)

"A Little Bit Crazy" is a song written and recorded by American country music artist Eddy Raven. It was released in February 1982 as the third single from the album Desperate Dreams. The song reached #14 on the Billboard Hot Country Singles & Tracks chart.

== Chart performance ==
Chart (1982)	Peak position
US Hot Country Songs (Billboard)	14
Canadian RPM Country Tracks	43
