= I Wanna Hear It from You =

Single by Eddy Raven

from the album Love and Other Hard Times
- B-side: "Room to Run"
- Released: August 3, 1985
- Genre: Country
- Length: 3:18
- Label: RCA
- Songwriter(s): Nancy Montgomery, Rick Giles
- Producer(s): Paul Worley, Eddy Raven

Eddy Raven singles chronology
"Operator, Operator" (1985)	"I Wanna Hear It from You" (1985)	"You Should Have Been Gone by Now" (1986)

"I Wanna Hear It from You" is a song written by Nancy Montgomery and Rick Giles, and recorded by American country music artist Eddy Raven. It was released in August 1985 as the second single from the album Love and Other Hard Times. The song reached #8 on the Billboard Hot Country Singles & Tracks chart.

== Chart performance ==
Chart (1985)	Peak position
US Hot Country Songs (Billboard)	8
Canadian RPM Country Tracks	6
