= 'Til You Cry =

Single by Eddy Raven

from the album The Best of Eddy Raven
- B-side: "Just for the Sake of the Thrill"
- Released: December 3, 1988
- Genre: Country
- Length: 3:52
- Label: RCA
- Songwriters: Steve Bogard, Rick Giles
- Producer: Barry Beckett

Eddy Raven singles chronology
"Joe Knows How to Live" (1988)	"'Til You Cry" (1988)	"In a Letter to You" (1989)

"'Til You Cry" is a song written by Steve Bogard and Rick Giles, and recorded by American country pop artist Juice Newton for her 1987 album Emotion. In 1988, it was covered by American country music artist Eddy Raven and released in December as the third single from his compilation album The Best of Eddy Raven. The song reached number 4 on the Billboard Hot Country Singles & Tracks chart.

== Chart performance ==
Chart (1988–1989)	Peak position
Canadian RPM Country Tracks	7
US Hot Country Songs (Billboard)	4

=== Year-end charts ===
Chart (1989)	Position
Canada Country Tracks (RPM)	95
US Country Songs (Billboard)	60
