= I Could Use Another You (song) =

Single by Eddy Raven

from the album I Could Use Another You
- B-side: "Folks Out on the Road"
- Released: July 21, 1984
- Genre: Country
- Length: 2:52
- Label: RCA
- Songwriter(s): Tom Shapiro, Chris Waters, Bucky Jones
- Producer(s): Eddy Raven, Paul Worley

Eddy Raven singles chronology
"I Got Mexico" (1984)	"I Could Use Another You" (1984)	"She's Gonna Win Your Heart" (1984)

"I Could Use Another You" is a song written by Tom Shapiro, Chris Waters and Bucky Jones, and recorded by American country music artist Eddy Raven. It was released in July 1984 as the second single and title track from the album I Could Use Another You. The song reached #9 on the Billboard Hot Country Singles & Tracks chart.

== Chart performance ==
Chart (1984)	Peak position
US Hot Country Songs (Billboard)	9
Canadian RPM Country Tracks	6
