= Eyes (album) =

Studio album by Eddy Raven
- Released: 1980
- Genre: Country
- Label: Dimension
- Producer: Ray Pennington, Ronnie Gant

Eddy Raven chronology
This Is Eddy Raven (1976)	Eyes (1980)	Desperate Dreams (1981)

Singles from Eyes
- 1. "Dealin' with the Devil" Released: February 1980; 2. "You've Got Those Eyes" Released: June 1980; 3. "Another Texas Song" Released: September 1980; 4. "Peace of MInd" Released: January 1981

Eyes is the third studio album by American country music singer Eddy Raven. It was released in 1980 on Dimension Records.

== Content ==
Dimension Records was a label founded by Raven's then-manager. Ray Pennington produced the album, with further production from Ronnie Gant on "Dealin' with the Devil", "Sweet Mother Texas", and "Another Texas Song".

Five songs from the album reached the Hot Country Singles chart between 1979 and 1980: "Sweet Mother Texas" at number 44, "Dealin' with the Devil" at number 25, "You've Got Those Eyes" at number 30, "Another Texas Song" at number 34, and "Peace of Mind" at number 23. Dimension promoted "Dealin' with the Devil" by shipping videocassettes of Raven performing the song to various radio stations surveyed by Billboard. Record World published positive reviews of "Another Texas Song" and "Peace of Mind", calling the former a "plucky, self-penned tune that displays more of his writer-artist talents", while calling him "one of the smoothest country singers around" in a review of the latter.

Merle Haggard covered "Dealin' with the Devil" on his 1981 live album Rainbow Stew Live at Anaheim Stadium, and Waylon Jennings covered "Sweet Mother Texas" on his 1986 album Sweet Mother Texas.

== Track listing ==
No.	Title	Writer(s)	Length
1.	"Dealin' with the Devil"	Eddy Raven, Sanger D. Shafer	2:33
2.	"First Few Days of Love"	Raven, Shafer	2:45
3.	"Sweet Mother Texas"	Raven, Shafer	2:38
4.	"Day After Day"	Raven	2:30
5.	"Just Leave Me Alone"	Raven, Shafer	2:27
6.	"You've Got Those Eyes"	Raven, David Powelson	3:10
7.	"Peace of Mind"	Raven	2:43
8.	"Fais Do Do"	Raven	2:24
9.	"It Takes a Long Long Time to Say Goodbye"	Raven, Powelson	2:52
10.	"Another Texas Song"	Raven	2:41

== Weekly charts ==
Chart (1980)	Peak position
US Top Country Albums (Billboard)	55
