= The Shooters =

US musical group

- Origin: Muscle Shoals, Alabama, U.S.
- Years active: 1987–1990
- Label: Epic
- Spinoffs: Baker & Myers
- Past members: Walt Aldridge; Gary Baker; Barry Billings; Chalmers Davis; Michael Dillon

The Shooters were an country music band founded in Muscle Shoals, Alabama. They consisted of Walt Aldridge (lead vocals, guitar), Gary Baker (bass guitar), Barry Billings (guitar), Chalmers Davis (keyboards), and Michael Dillon (drums). They charted several times on the Billboard country charts between 1986 and 1989. The quintet's first four singles were to have been included on an album titled Going Against the Wind. 1989's Solid as a Rock included their highest-charting single, the number 13 "Borderline".

After disbanding, Aldridge worked as a songwriter and record producer, while Baker joined songwriting partner Frank J. Myers to write John Michael Montgomery's 1994 hit single "I Swear", which was later covered by All-4-One as well. Baker and Myers also recorded one album as the duo Baker & Myers. Chalmers Davis died on September 14, 2024, aged 73 & Lead Singer Walt Aldridge passed away at the age of 70 on November 19, 2025.

== Discography ==
=== Albums ===
Title	Details	Peak chart positions	
Title	Details	US Country	CAN Country
The Shooters	Release date: 1987; Label: Epic Records	—	—
Solid as a Rock	Release date: April 11, 1989; Label: Epic Records	40	23
"—" denotes releases that did not chart

=== Singles ===
Year	Single	Peak chart positions		Album
Year	Single	US Country	CAN Country	Album
1987	"They Only Come Out at Night"	21	49	The Shooters
1987	"'Til the Old Wears Off"	41	39	The Shooters
1987	"Tell It to Your Teddy Bear"	34	—	The Shooters
1988	"I Taught Her Everything She Knows About Love"	31	46	The Shooters
1988	"Borderline"	13	21	Solid as a Rock
1989	"If I Ever Go Crazy"	17	21	Solid as a Rock
1989	"You Just Can't Lose 'Em All"	39	55	Solid as a Rock
"—" denotes releases that did not chart

=== Music videos ===
Year	Video	Director
1989	"If I Ever Go Crazy"	Steve Boyle
