= Sooner or Later (The Forester Sisters song) =

Single by Eddy Raven

from the album Temporary Sanity
- B-side: "Little Sheba"
- Released: December 23, 1989
- Genre: Country
- Length: 3:59
- Label: Capitol Nashville
- Songwriters: Susan Longacre, Bill LaBounty, Beckie Foster
- Producer: Barry Beckett

Eddy Raven singles chronology
"Bayou Boys" (1989)	"Sooner or Later" (1989)	"Island" (1990)

"Sooner or Later" is a song recorded by American country music group The Forester Sisters on their 1987 album You Again. In 1989, the song was recorded by country artist Eddy Raven and released in December 1989 as the third single from his album Temporary Sanity. The song reached #6 on the Billboard Hot Country Singles & Tracks chart. The song was written by Susan Longacre, Bill LaBounty and Beckie Foster.

== Content ==
The song is composed in the key of D major. Its verses follow the pattern G-A-G-D twice, followed by E7-G-A. The chorus follows the pattern D-Bm-G-A twice before ending on a D7 chord.

== Critical reception ==
An uncredited review in Billboard described it as a "pounding, rollicking number" that "should propel him back to those same chart heights."

== Chart performance ==
Chart (1989–1990)	Peak position
Canada Country Singles (RPM)	18
US Hot Country Songs (Billboard)	6

=== Year-end charts ===
Chart (1990)	Position
US Country Songs (Billboard)	61
