= She's Playing Hard to Forget =

1982 single by Eddy Raven

Single by Eddy Raven

from the album Desperate Dreams
- B-side: "Desperate Dreams"
- Released: June 19, 1982
- Genre: Country
- Length: 2:25
- Label: Elektra
- Songwriter(s): Keith Stegall, Elroy Kahanek
- Producer(s): Jimmy Bowen

Eddy Raven singles chronology
"A Little Bit Crazy" (1982)	"She's Playing Hard to Forget" (1982)	"San Antonio Nights" (1982)

"She's Playing Hard to Forget" is a song written by Keith Stegall and Elroy Kahanek, and recorded by American country music artist Eddy Raven. It was released in June 1982 as the fourth single from the album Desperate Dreams. The song reached #10 on the Billboard Hot Country Singles & Tracks chart.

== Chart performance ==
Chart (1982)	Peak position
US Hot Country Songs (Billboard)	10
