= Joe Knows How to Live =

Single by Eddy Raven

from the album The Best of Eddy Raven
- B-side: "Looking for Ways"
- Released: May 1988
- Genre: Country
- Length: 3:54
- Label: RCA
- Songwriter(s): Troy Seals; Max D. Barnes; Graham Lyle
- Producer(s): Barry Beckett

Eddy Raven singles chronology
"I'm Gonna Get You" (1988)	"Joe Knows How to Live" (1988)	"'Til You Cry" (1988)

"Joe Knows How to Live" is a song written by Troy Seals, Max D. Barnes and Graham Lyle, and recorded by American country music artist Eddy Raven. It was released in May 1988 as the second single from his compilation album The Best of Eddy Raven. The song was Raven's fourth number one on the country chart. The single went to number one for one week and spent a total of fifteen weeks on the country chart.

The song was previously recorded by the Nitty Gritty Dirt Band on their 1987 album Hold On.

== Content ==
The song is told from the point of view of a blue collar worker envious of one of his co-workers, Joe. Joe's free-spirited ways are evidenced by Raven singing "Well I hate to admit it, but Joe sure knows how to live". Joe tells his linemates of a trip to Mexico he is taking with Betty, a waitress at a diner that all are familiar with. He later returns with photos and a hat he purchased in Mexico.

The trip Joe has taken was presumably done with ill-used sick days, as Raven says in the spoken-word fading end of the song, "well, they would have fired me if I'd have done something like that". It also suggests that Joe is married, as Raven asks rhetorically "you think Joe's wife knows about that yet?" before the song completely fades.

Billy Warden of the Newport News Daily Press reviewed the song favorably, noting the "countrified Caribbean sway" and Raven's vocal tone.

== Charts ==
=== Weekly charts ===
Chart (1988)	Peak position
US Hot Country Songs (Billboard)	1
Canadian RPM Country Tracks	1

=== Year-end charts ===
Chart (1988)	Position
Canadian RPM Country Tracks	12
US Hot Country Songs (Billboard)	10
