= Right for the Flight =

Studio album by Eddy Raven
- Released: 1991
- Genre: Country
- Label: Capitol Records
- Producer: Barry Beckett

Eddy Raven chronology
Temporary Sanity (1988)	Right for the Flight (1991)	Wild Eyed and Crazy (1994)

Singles from Right for the Flight
- 1. "Rock Me in the Rhythn of Your Love" Released: March 1991; 2. "Too Much Candy for a Dime" Released: October 17, 1981

Right for the Flight is the ninth studio album by American country music singer Eddy Raven. It was released in 1991 by Capitol Records.

== Content ==
The album included two singles: "Rock Me in the Rhythm of Your Love" and "Too Much Candy for a Dime", which charted at numbers 60 and 58 respectively on the Billboard Hot Country Songs charts in 1991.

== Critical reception ==
Susan Beyer of The Ottawa Citizen gave the album a largely positive review, calling "I Know That Car" a "killer ballad" while also praising the stylistic varieties provided by "Leon and Maggie", "Like a Hurricane", and "Too Much Candy for a Dime".

== Track listing ==
1. "Rock Me in the Rhythm of Your Love" (Lisa Silver, Robert Earl Keen) - 3:22
2. "Torn Up" (Tommy Rocco, Austin Roberts, Charlie Black) - 3:00
3. "Hot Pink" (Tom Paden, Sue Fenton) - 3:26
4. "I Know That Car" (Chris Waters, Don Henry) - 3:22
5. "Ain't Nothin' but a Heartache" (Craig Karp, Rob Crosby) - 3:31
6. "Leon and Maggie" (Raven, Troy Seals) - 2:45
7. "Like a Hurricane" (Michael Clark) - 3:35
8. "Too Much Candy for a Dime" (Raven, David Powelson) - 2:57
9. "Somebody's Tearin' the Flag" (Raven) - 3:45
10. "Cajun Song" (Danny Rhodes, Jack Rolland, Raven) - 3:43
  - featuring Doug Kershaw

== Personnel ==
Adapted from Right for the Flight liner notes.

Musicians

- Eddie Bayers - drums
- Barry Beckett - keyboards
- Michael Black - background vocals
- Larry Byrom - acoustic guitar
- Doug Kershaw - accordion
- Jim Horn - saxophone
- Mitch Humphries - keyboards
- Mike Lawler - synthesizer
- Danny Rhodes - acoustic guitar
- Michael Rhodes - bass guitar
- Bruce Watkins - acoustic guitar
- Dennis Wilson - background vocals
- Curtis Young - background vocals
- Reggie Young - lead guitar, rhythm guitar

Technical

- David Bayer - recording assistant
- Barry Beckett - producer
- Mike Clute - recording
- Jeff Coppage - recording assistant
- Jim DeMain - recording, recording assistant
- Rob Feaster - recording
- Pete Greene - recording
- Carlos Grier - mastering assistant
- Chris Hammond - recording
- Scott Hendricks - recording, mixing
- John Hurley - recording, recording assistant
- Mark Nevers - recording assistant, mixing assistant
- Denny Purcell - mastering
