= Desperate Dreams =

Studio album by Eddy Raven
- Released: September 1981
- Genre: Country
- Label: Elektra
- Producer: Jimmy Bowen

Eddy Raven chronology
Eyes (1980)	Desperate Dreams (1981)	I Could Use Another You (1984)

Singles from Desperate Dreams
- 1. "I Should've Called" Released: May 23, 1981; 2. "Who Do You Know in California" Released: October 17, 1981; 3. "A Little Bit Crazy" Released: February 20, 1982; 4. "She's Playing Hard to Forget" Released: June 19, 1982

Desperate Dreams is the fourth studio album by American country music singer Eddy Raven. It was released in September 1981 on Elektra Records.

== Content and reception ==
Four singles were released from the album: "I Should've Called", "Who Do You Know in California", "A Little Bit Crazy", and "She's Playing Hard to Forget". All four charted within the top 20 of Hot Country Songs between 1981 and 1982.

Record World wrote of the album that Raven's "commercial potential has not yet been reached", while praising the vocal delivery on the singles. Tom Roland of Allmusic thought that the album had more creative control from Raven than its predecessors did.

== Track listing ==
All songs written by Eddy Raven except as noted.

No.	Title	Writer(s)	Length
1.	"Desperate Dreams"		2:48
2.	"Who Do You Know in California"		2:48
3.	"You're Too Much for Me"	Jesse Winchester	3:09
4.	"I Know You're the Rain"	Charlie Black, Rory Bourke	3:32
5.	"I Should've Called"		3:07
6.	"A Little Bit Crazy"		2:16
7.	"Thinking It Over"		3:26
8.	"She's Playing Hard to Forget"	Keith Stegall, Elroy Kahanek	2:22
9.	"Young Girl"		2:56
10.	"Loving Arms and Lying Eyes"		3:28

== Personnel ==
- Acoustic Guitar: Kenny Bell, Leo Jackson, Bobby Thompson, Paul Worley
- Background Vocals: Dennis William Wilson
- Bass Guitar: Bob Wray
- Drums: Roger Clark
- Electric Guitar: Fred Newell, Reggie Young
- Keyboards: Randy McCormick
- Lead Vocals: Eddy Raven
- Sitar: Reggie Young
- Steel Guitar: Sonny Garrish

== Charts ==
=== Weekly charts ===
Chart (1981–1982)	Peak position
US Top Country Albums (Billboard)	26

=== Year-end charts ===
Chart (1982)	Position
US Top Country Albums (Billboard)	30
