= Chris Mohr =

American football player (born 1966)

No. 5, 11, 4, 9, 13
- Position: Punter

Personal information
- Born: May 11, 1966 (age 60); Atlanta, Georgia, U.S.
- Listed height: 6 ft 5 in (1.96 m)
- Listed weight: 215 lb (98 kg)

Career information
- High school: Warrenton (GA) Briarwood
- College: Alabama
- NFL draft: 1989: 6th round, 146th overall pick

Career history
- Tampa Bay Buccaneers (1989); Montreal Machine (1991); Buffalo Bills (1991–2000); Atlanta Falcons (2001–2004); Washington Redskins (2005)*
- * Offseason or practice squad member only

Awards and highlights
- PFWA All-Rookie Team (1989); All-World League (1991)

Career NFL statistics
- Punts: 1,152
- Punting yards: 46,570
- Punting avg: 40.4
- Stats at Pro Football Reference

Christopher Garrett Mohr (born May 11, 1966) is an American former professional football player who was a punter in the National Football League (NFL). Mohr grew up in Thomson, Georgia, where he played football at Briarwood Academy. He was recruited by the University of Alabama, where he was the team's starting punter for all four years. After being named the Southeastern Conference's best punter his senior year, he spent the 1989 NFL season with the Tampa Bay Buccaneers and was their punter the entire season. He was a sixth round choice (146th overall) in the draft that year by the team. He spent one season with the Montreal Machine of the World League of American Football (WLAF) before being signed by the Buffalo Bills. Mohr was with the Bills from 1991 to 2000, during which time he appeared in three Super Bowls with the team—Super Bowl XXVI, Super Bowl XXVII, and Super Bowl XXVIII. He signed with his hometown Atlanta Falcons before the 2001 NFL season, where he played for four years before being waived in 2005. He was signed by the Washington Redskins before the 2005 NFL season began, but was cut a few days later. He officially retired from the NFL in 2007 by signing a one-day contract with the Buffalo Bills. Mohr has four boys. Garrett, Harrison, Quinn and Chapman. Garrett Mohr, his oldest son, is currently an NFL free agent.

Of note is that Mohr, along with Casey Beathard, co-wrote "I See Me" for country singer Travis Tritt, which appeared on Tritt's album My Honky Tonk History.

== NFL career statistics ==
Legend
	Led the league
**Bold**	Career high

=== Regular season ===
Year	Team	Punting									
Year	Team	GP	Punts	Yds	Net Yds	Lng	Avg	Net Avg	Blk	Ins20	TB
1989	TAM	16	84	3,311	2,759	58	39.4	32.1	**2**	10	3
1991	BUF	16	54	2,085	1,952	58	38.6	36.1	0	12	4
1992	BUF	15	60	2,531	2,206	61	**42.2**	36.8	0	12	7
1993	BUF	16	74	2,991	2,664	58	40.4	36.0	0	19	4
1994	BUF	16	67	2,799	2,415	71	41.8	36.0	0	13	3
1995	BUF	16	86	3,473	3,109	60	40.4	36.2	0	23	7
1996	BUF	16	**101**	**4,194**	**3,688**	**80**	41.5	36.5	0	**27**	**13**
1997	BUF	16	90	3,764	3,278	59	41.8	36.0	1	24	6
1998	BUF	16	69	2,882	2,288	57	41.8	33.2	0	18	11
1999	BUF	16	73	2,840	2,474	60	38.9	33.9	0	20	7
2000	BUF	16	95	3,661	3,017	57	38.5	31.4	1	19	5
2001	ATL	16	69	2,680	2,490	55	38.8	36.1	0	25	3
2002	ATL	16	67	2,804	2,595	59	41.9	**38.7**	0	21	5
2003	ATL	16	87	3,473	3,132	54	39.9	36.0	0	19	2
2004	ATL	16	76	3,082	2,808	56	40.6	36.9	0	19	7
Career		239	1,152	46,570	40,875	80	40.4	35.4	4	281	87

=== Playoffs ===
Year	Team	Punting									
Year	Team	GP	Punts	Yds	Net Yds	Lng	Avg	Net Avg	Blk	Ins20	TB
1991	BUF	3	**17**	**614**	**547**	53	36.1	32.2	0	**5**	**1**
1992	BUF	**4**	11	444	374	48	40.4	34.0	0	3	0
1993	BUF	3	12	430	407	52	35.8	33.9	0	3	0
1995	BUF	2	9	337	292	**56**	37.4	32.4	0	2	**1**
1996	BUF	1	5	216	205	53	**43.2**	**41.0**	0	1	0
1998	BUF	1	2	73	53	39	36.5	26.5	0	1	0
1999	BUF	1	8	308	276	46	38.5	34.5	0	3	0
2002	ATL	2	10	360	336	42	36.0	33.6	0	4	**1**
2004	ATL	2	7	214	198	47	30.6	28.3	0	1	**1**
Career		19	81	2,996	2,688	56	37.0	33.2	0	23	4
