= She's Gonna Win Your Heart =

Single by Eddy Raven

from the album I Could Use Another You
- B-side: "Looking for Ways"
- Released: November 10, 1984
- Genre: Country
- Length: 3:15
- Label: RCA
- Songwriter(s): Billy Burnette, Mentor Williams
- Producer(s): Eddy Raven, Paul Worley

Eddy Raven singles chronology
"I Could Use Another You" (1984)	"She's Gonna Win Your Heart" (1984)	"Operator, Operator" (1985)

"She's Gonna Win Your Heart" is a song written by Billy Burnette and Mentor Williams, and recorded by American country music artist Eddy Raven. It was released in November 1984 as the third single from the album I Could Use Another You. The song reached #9 on the Billboard Hot Country Singles & Tracks chart.

== Chart performance ==
Chart (1984–1985)	Peak position
US Hot Country Songs (Billboard)	9
Canadian RPM Country Tracks	5
