= I'm Gonna Get You (Billy Swan song) =

Single by Billy Swan
- B-side: "Three Chord Rock and Roll"
- Released: 1987
- Genre: Country
- Length: 2:29
- Label: Mercury, Polygram
- Songwriter: Dennis Linde
- Producer: Chip Young

Billy Swan singles chronology
| "You Must Be Lookin' for Me" (1986) | "I'm Gonna Get You" (1987) |

"I'm Gonna Get You" is a song written by Dennis Linde. It was first recorded by Billy Swan, whose version was released as a single in 1987 and went to number 63 on the U.S. country singles charts. It became a hit the following year for Eddy Raven. It was released in January 1988 as the first single from his compilation album The Best of Eddy Raven The song was Raven's third number one on the country chart. The single went to number one for one week and spent a total of fourteen weeks in the Top 40.

"I'm Gonna Get You"

Single by Eddy Raven

from the album The Best of Eddy Raven
- B-side: "Other Than Montreal"
- Released: January 1988
- Genre: Country, cajun
- Length: 2:43
- Label: RCA
- Songwriter: Dennis Linde
- Producer: Barry Beckett

Eddy Raven singles chronology
| "Shine, Shine, Shine" (1987) | "I'm Gonna Get You" (1988) | "Joe Knows How to Live" (1988) |

== Chart performance ==
=== Billy Swan ===
| Chart (1987) | Peak position |
|---|---|
| US Hot Country Songs (Billboard) | 63 |

=== Eddy Raven ===
| Chart (1988) | Peak position |
|---|---|
| US Hot Country Songs (Billboard) | 1 |
| Canadian RPM Country Tracks | 1 |

=== Year-end charts ===
| Chart (1988) | Position |
|---|---|
| Canadian RPM Country Tracks | 2 |
| US Hot Country Songs (Billboard) | 9 |

== Covers ==
Irish singer Derek Ryan covered the song on his 2012 album Dreamers and Believers.
