= Bayou Boys =

Single by Eddy Raven

from the album Temporary Sanity
- B-side: "Angel Fire"
- Released: August 1989
- Genre: Country
- Length: 2:49
- Label: Universal
- Songwriters: Eddy Raven; Troy Seals; Frank J. Myers
- Producer: Barry Beckett

Eddy Raven singles chronology
"In a Letter to You" (1989)	"Bayou Boys" (1989)	"Sooner or Later" (1990)

"Bayou Boys" is a song co-written and recorded by American country music artist Eddy Raven. It was released in August 1989 as the second single from his album Temporary Sanity. The song was Raven's sixth and final number one on the country chart. The single went to number one for one week and spent fourteen weeks on the country chart. It was written by Raven, Troy Seals and Frank J. Myers.

== Chart performance ==
Chart (1989)	Peak position
Canada Country Singles (RPM)	1
US Hot Country Songs (Billboard)	1

=== Year-end charts ===
Chart (1989)	Position
Canada Country Tracks (RPM)	20
US Country Songs (Billboard)	25
