= You're Never Too Old for Young Love =

Single by Eddy Raven

from the album Right Hand Man
- B-side: "Other Than Montreal"
- Released: March 28, 1987
- Genre: Country rock, country pop, pop rock
- Length: 2:44
- Label: RCA
- Songwriter(s): Frank J. Myers, Rick Giles
- Producer(s): Don Gant, Eddy Raven

Eddy Raven singles chronology
"Right Hand Man" (1986)	"You're Never Too Old for Young Love" (1987)	"Shine, Shine, Shine" (1987)

"You're Never Too Old for Young Love" is a song written by Frank J. Myers and Rick Giles, and recorded by American country music artist Eddy Raven. It was released in March 1987 as the third single from the album Right Hand Man. The song reached #3 on the Billboard Hot Country Singles & Tracks chart.

== Chart performance ==
Chart (1987)	Peak position
US Hot Country Songs (Billboard)	3
Canadian RPM Country Tracks	6
