= Gary Baker (songwriter) =

American singer-songwriter

- Born: August 8, 1952 (age 73)
- Origin: Niagara Falls, New York, United States
- Genres: Country
- Occupations: Singer-songwriter, vocalist
- Instruments: Vocals, guitar
- Years active: 1970s–present
- Formerly of: The Shooters, Baker & Myers
- Website: Gary Baker Music

Gary Baker (born August 8, 1952, in Niagara Falls, New York) is an American country music singer and songwriter.

== Career ==
In the late 1970s, Baker was a musician with the LeBlanc and Carr Band. Baker was also a singer musician with the country-pop band, The Shooters. He has written songs for John Michael Montgomery, Alabama and others. Baker has been writing with his songwriting partner, Frank J. Myers since 1988, both having played in Marie Osmond's band. Baker and Myers' most successful song as songwriters is "I Swear", recorded by both All 4-One and John Michael Montgomery. The song sold more than 20 million copies internationally, and won the 1995 Grammy for "Best Country Song". In 1995, he and Myers recorded one album on Curb Records as the duo Baker & Myers.

He also wrote the hit "I'm Already There" for Lonestar, the band's seventh #1 single. It spent six weeks at the top of the Billboard Hot Country Singles & Tracks chart.

== Personal life ==
Baker lives in Sheffield, Alabama with his wife and his four sons, Shane, Ryan, Brett, and Cole, and daughter, Ashley.

Baker's granddaughter, Cadence, auditioned for season 20 of American Idol and made it to Hollywood then on to Hawaii week and was eliminated during the Top 20.

== See also ==
- Baker & Myers
