= Operator, Operator =

Single by Eddy Raven

from the album Love and Other Hard Times
- B-side: "Just for the Sake of the Thrill"
- Released: April 20, 1985
- Genre: Country
- Length: 3:04
- Label: RCA
- Songwriters: Larry Willoughby, Janet Willoughby
- Producers: Paul Worley, Eddy Raven

Eddy Raven singles chronology
"She's Gonna Win Your Heart" (1984)	"Operator, Operator" (1985)	"I Wanna Hear It from You" (1985)

"Operator, Operator" (also titled "Heart on the Line (Operator, Operator)") is a country music song co-written and recorded by Larry Willoughby, a cousin of Rodney Crowell. He released the song in 1983 from the album Building Bridges, and took it to number 65 on the Hot Country Songs charts. The Oak Ridge Boys also recorded it under the original title, as the b-side to their 1983 single "Love Song".

A 1985 recording by Eddy Raven, under the title "Operator, Operator", appeared on his album Love and Other Hard Times. This version went to number 9 on the same chart. Two versions of Raven's version were issued: One has a standard fade during the reprisal of the refrain, the other has a slightly different transition into the final refrain, with Raven – after being cut off – screaming into the phone that he has no more change to continue the call, with that track being played over Raven singing.

== Chart performance ==
=== Larry Willoughby ===
Chart (1983)	Peak position
US Hot Country Songs (Billboard)	65

=== Eddy Raven ===
Chart (1985)	Peak position
US Hot Country Songs (Billboard)	9
Canadian RPM Country Tracks	8
