= Eddy Raven =

American country music singer and songwriter (born 1944)

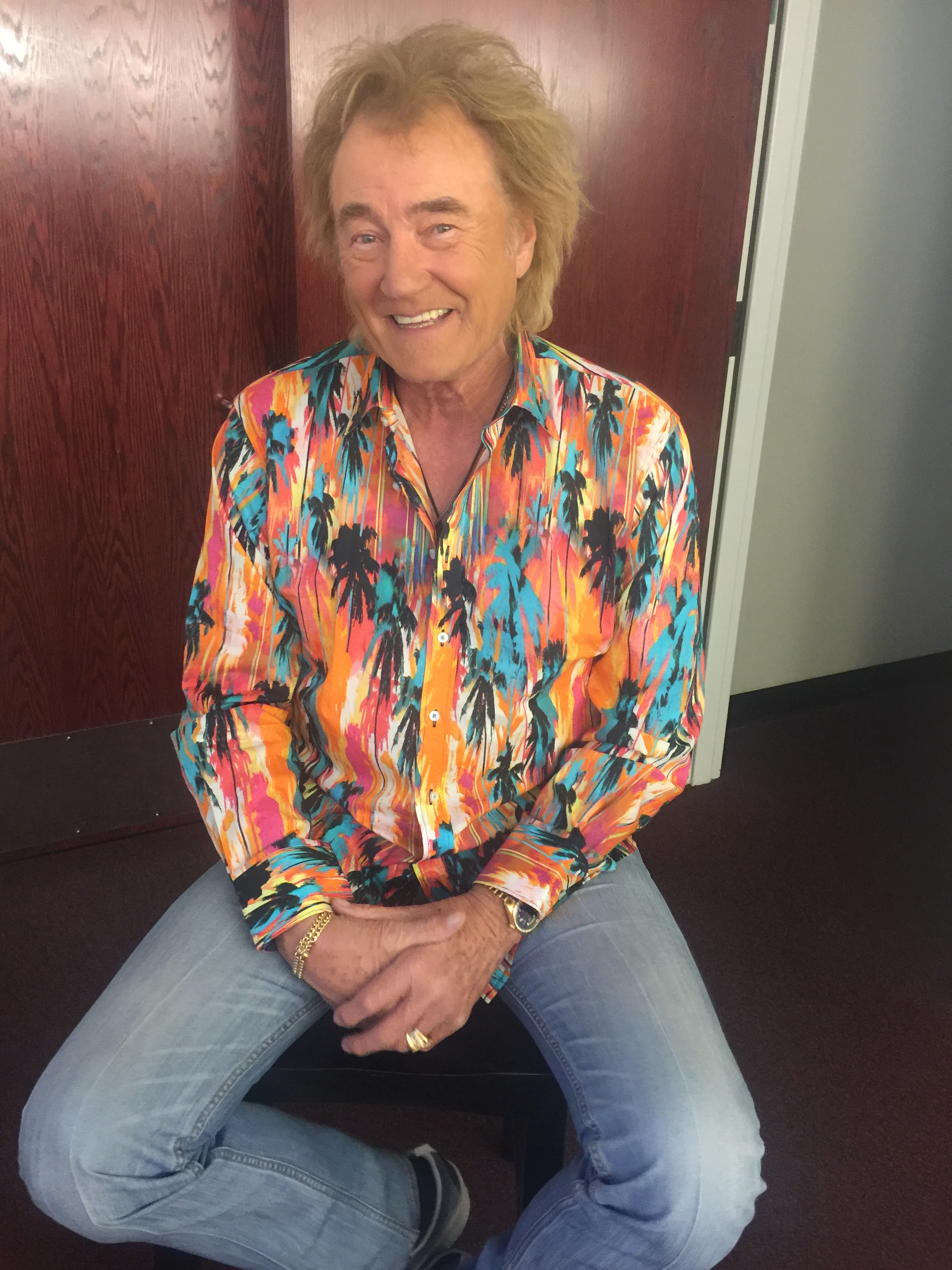
- Raven in 2016

Background information
- Born: Edward Garvin Futch; August 19, 1944 (age 81); Lafayette, Louisiana, U.S.
- Genres: Country; Cajun
- Occupations: Singer; Songwriter
- Instrument: Vocals
- Years active: 1962–2018
- Labels: Cosmos; La Louisianne; Monument; ABC/Dot; Dimension; Elektra; RCA Nashville; Universal; Capitol Nashville; Intersound; K-Tel; RMG
- Website: EddyRaven.com

Edward Garvin Futch (born August 19, 1944), known professionally as Eddy Raven, is an American country music singer and songwriter. Active from 1962 to 2018, Raven has recorded for several record labels, including ABC, Dimension, Elektra, RCA, Universal, and Capitol Records. After multiple albums that yielded few hit songs, his greatest commercial success came between 1984 and 1990, when Raven achieved six number-one singles on the Billboard Hot Country Songs charts: "I Got Mexico", "Shine, Shine, Shine", "I'm Gonna Get You", "Joe Knows How to Live", "In a Letter to You", and "Bayou Boys". Raven has a total of 18 top-10 hits on that chart. Although his chart success diminished in the 1990s, Raven continued to record throughout the 1990s and into the 21st century. In addition to his own work, he has written singles for Don Gibson, Randy Cornor, Jeannie C. Riley, Connie Smith, and the Oak Ridge Boys, among others. Raven's music is defined by mainstream country, country pop, Cajun music, and reggae, and he wrote a large number of his singles by himself or with Frank J. Myers.

== Early years ==
Edward Garvin Futch was born in Lafayette, Louisiana, on August 19, 1944. He is the oldest of 10 children, and his father worked as a truck driver. Futch had originally considered a professional career in baseball, but chose not to after breaking his ankle. Growing up, he cited Cajun music as a musical influence, along with the country music sounds from popular radio broadcasts such as the Louisiana Hayride, New Orleans blues, and the new sounds of rock and roll. Futch first played in a band at age 13. He later went to work for a radio station in Georgia, when his family moved there, and in 1962, he self-released the single "Once a Fool". The single was credited to "Eddy Raven" due to a printing error, but he chose to keep that as his stage name. When his family moved back to Louisiana, Raven worked at a recording studio called La Louisianne Records and its outlet the Music Mart, where he recorded and released his first album, That Cajun Country Sound.

== Musical career ==
=== Beginnings ===
Raven's first record was heard by fellow Cajun country musician Jimmy C. Newman, who helped him sign a publishing contract with Acuff-Rose Music. Both Newman and Raven's father then encouraged him to move to Nashville, Tennessee. There, he wrote singles for various country music artists, including Don Gibson, Connie Smith, Jeannie C. Riley, and Randy Cornor. Raven began recording for ABC Records in 1974 after Acuff-Rose songwriter and producer Don Gant became head of artists and repertoire (A&R) for that label. His first charted single on the Billboard Hot Country Songs chart, his own composition "The Last of the Sunshine Cowboys", came in 1974 on ABC. Raven charted seven more singles for the label between then and 1975, the most successful being "Good News, Bad News", which achieved a peak of number 27 there. ABC also issued one album, This Is Eddy Raven, in early 1976. The album, also produced by Gant, was reviewed favorably by Cash Box magazine. This review stated that his "natural musical ability, coupled with the emotional levels of his voice, captures the full flavor of each selection on this appealing album."

Raven left ABC in 1976 when Gant also departed the label. He signed with Monument Records in 1978 and two singles for them: "You're a Dancer" was a minor entry on Hot Country Songs, but "Colinda" did not chart and Monument closed its country division soon afterward. After leaving Monument, Raven was encouraged by singer Bob Luman to travel to Texas and draw inspiration from that state's music scene. This resulted in his 1980 album Eyes on Dimension Records, an independent label founded by his then-manager. Ray Pennington produced the album, with assistance from Don Gant's brother Ronnie Gant on three tracks, and Raven wrote or co-wrote every song on it. The album charted five singles on Hot Country Songs: "Sweet Mother Texas", "Dealin' with the Devil", "You've Got Those Eyes", "Another Texas Song", and "Peace of Mind". The last of these was the most successful of the five, reaching number 23 in 1981. "Dealin' with the Devil" was also one of the first country music songs to be promoted via music video; specifically, Dimension Records shipped videocassettes of Raven performing the song to 54 stations that were surveyed by Billboard at the time. Record World published positive reviews of the singles "Another Texas Song" and "Peace of Mind", calling the former a "plucky, self-penned tune that displays more of his writer-artist talents", while calling him "one of the smoothest country singers around" in a review of the latter.

In 1981, record producer Jimmy Bowen heard "Dealin' with the Devil" and helped Raven sign to Elektra Records. According to Raven, Bowen was the first record producer he encountered who was willing to let him record "my music, not what the record company wanted me to cut." His only Elektra album, Desperate Dreams, came out late that year. The album accounted for four chart singles on Hot Country Songs between 1981 and 1982: "I Should've Called", "Who Do You Know in California", "A Little Bit Crazy", and "She's Playing Hard to Forget", the last of which became his first top-10 hit there. Raven wrote the first three by himself. At the time of the album's release, Raven said that many of his songs were inspired by situations that he had encountered while touring. Specifically, he stated, "Who Do You Know in California" was inspired by an extramarital affair he had heard of in Dallas, Texas, but changed to being set in California because the latter fit the song's meter better. A concert review in The Arizona Republic noted of Raven's style at the time that his style had potential for pop crossovers, while also stating that the song showed his lyrical skill by not resolving its central theme. Record World wrote of the album that Raven's "commercial potential has not yet been reached", while praising the vocal delivery on the singles. Tom Roland of Allmusic thought that the album had more creative control from Raven than its predecessors did. At the end of his contract with Elektra, Raven had a second album recorded but never released, although it did have one charted single in "San Antonio Nights". Once his contract ended, Raven chose to undergo a brief recording hiatus to determine the viability of his career. During this hiatus, he disassociated himself from his existing producers and managers and began writing songs with Frank J. Myers, a songwriter who was also the guitarist and bandleader of his road band. After having success on the songwriting front, which included the title track of Tanya Tucker's late-1982 album Changes, Raven was inspired to resume recording in 1984.

=== 1984-88: RCA Records ===
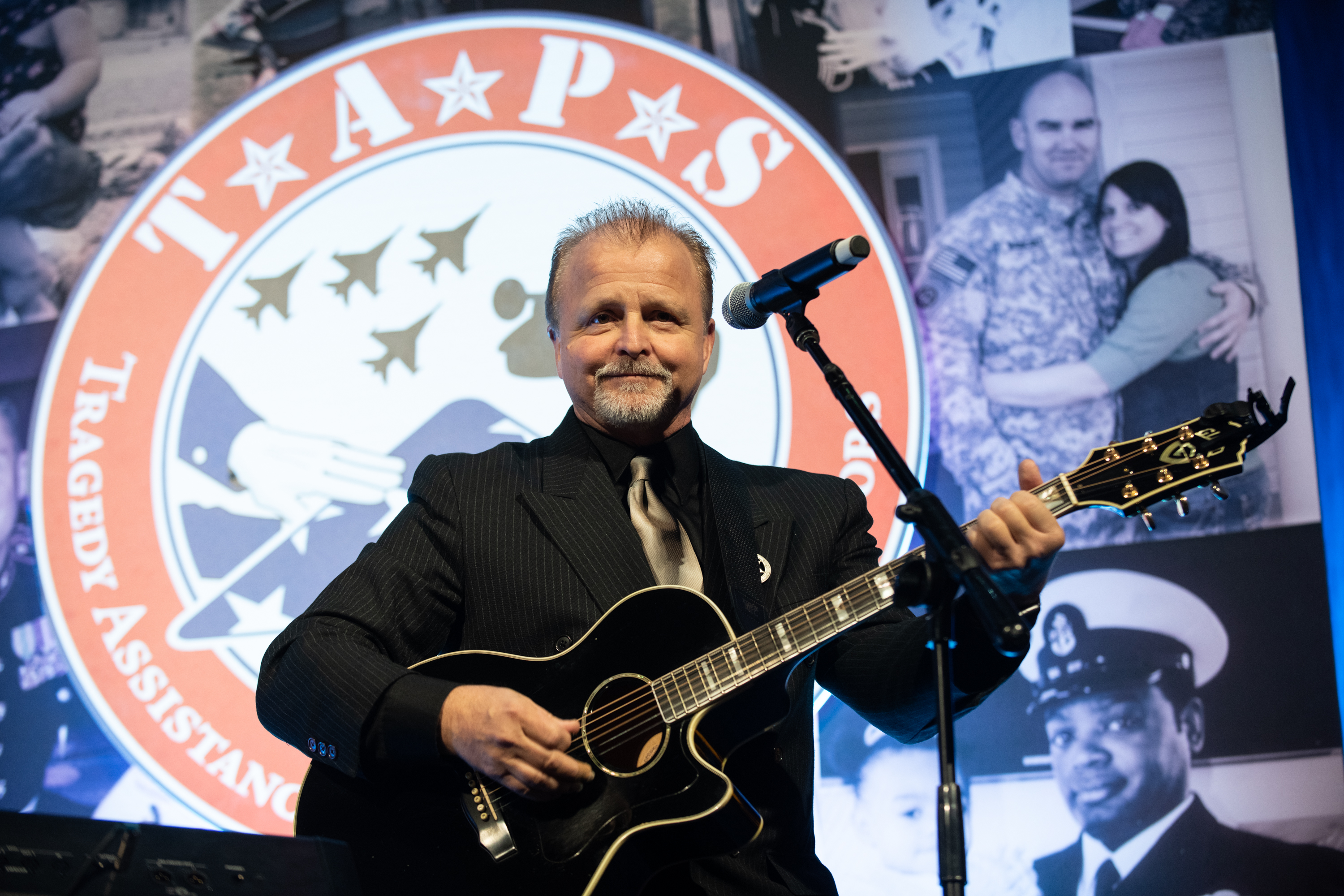
Frank J. Myers co-wrote several of Raven's singles, and formerly played guitar in his road band.

Raven moved to RCA Records Nashville in 1984 at the end of his self-imposed hiatus. His first single for the label was "I Got Mexico", and that year it became his first number-one single on Hot Country Songs. Also co-written by Myers, it was the first single from his RCA debut I Could Use Another You. Raven produced the album with Paul Worley, who was then known mainly as a session guitarist, but who became increasingly known as a producer throughout the 1980s and 1990s. Also released as singles from the album were the title track and "She's Gonna Win Your Heart", which both placed within the top 10 of Hot Country Songs. Cash Box described the title track as "an upbeat tune stressing Raven’s clear, distinct vocals." Writing for Stereo Review magazine (now known as Sound & Vision), Alanna Nash noted that while it had fewer songs written by Raven and a "slightly more mainstream" sound than its predecessors, the album was "well up to his own high standards"; she also considered Raven's singing more upbeat and confident than on previous efforts.

His next RCA album was 1985's Love and Other Hard Times, which he co-produced with Worley. It accounted for three top-10 singles on the country music charts: "Operator, Operator" (previously a single for co-writer Larry Willoughby in 1983), followed by "I Wanna Hear It from You" and "You Should Have Been Gone by Now". Raven co-wrote six of the songs on the album. In the process of recording, Worley and he chose to incorporate a more acoustic influence on some tracks, so chose Mark O'Connor to play fiddle and mandolin. Cash Box reviewed the album positively, stating that it was "another exhibition of his fine vocal range and his valuable songwriting ability." Billboard also published a positive review of the album, which said that his "haunting and sincere voice is matched here by some of the best material he's recorded in recent years." In 1985, Raven was nominated for the Horizon Award (now known as the Best New Artist award) from the Country Music Association.

Right Hand Man, released in late 1986 on RCA, accounted for four more singles: "Sometimes a Lady", "Right Hand Man", and "You're Never Too Old for Young Love" all achieved peaks of number three on the country music charts, while the final single "Shine, Shine, Shine" became his second number-one single. Don Gant returned to production duties except for "Sometimes a Lady", which Raven and Worley produced; the album was also Gant's last production credit, as he died in March 1987. In addition to Raven and Myers, other writers on the album included Gary Burr and Gary Scruggs, brother of bluegrass singer Randy Scruggs. Nash wrote in Stereo Review that the album seemed to focus more on Raven's singing over his songwriting, noting that the album had more of a country pop sound than its predecessors.

Raven's tenure with RCA ended with a compilation album titled The Best of Eddy Raven in 1988. In addition to most of his RCA singles, it included three new songs that were all sent out as singles. The first two were "I'm Gonna Get You" (written by Dennis Linde) and "Joe Knows How to Live", which both ascended to the top of the Hot Country Songs charts that year. Both had originally been cut by other artists in 1987: "I'm Gonna Get You" by Billy Swan, and "Joe Knows How to Live" by the Nitty Gritty Dirt Band on their album Hold On. The final single from The Best of Eddy Raven was "'Til You Cry", which peaked at number four. All of these were produced by session keyboardist and record producer Barry Beckett, who had contacted Raven and expressed interest in producing for him. While Beckett had played on some of Raven's previous albums, Raven said that he was unaware of Beckett's roles as a producer at the time and agreed to the offer after discovering that Beckett had been a producer on several recordings of which he was a fan. In advance of the album's release, Raven toured the Southern United States with then-labelmates Alabama.

=== 1988-1991: Universal and Capitol ===
In 1988, producer Jimmy Bowen founded the independent country music label Universal Records and signed Raven. While the editors of The Encyclopedia of Country Music stated that Raven chose to end his contract with RCA over poor record sales, Raven himself said at the time that Bowen had recruited him for the then-new label after determining that his musical style would fit well among the other artists he had signed. His initial release for the label was a cover of Shakin' Stevens' "In a Letter to You", also written by Dennis Linde. The song was the first release from his only Universal album Temporary Sanity, which came out in 1989. At Bowen's request, Beckett stayed on as Raven's producer. Raven said of the album's sound that he wanted to add influences of Latin and Caribbean music to his sound, noting in particular the inclusion of steel drums and comparing "Zydeco Lady" to the sound of Miami Sound Machine. "In a Letter to You" was the first number-one single for the Universal label, achieving that position on Billboard Hot Country Songs, along with the country music charts published by Radio & Records and Gavin Report. This was followed by his sixth and final number-one hit, "Bayou Boys", which he wrote with Myers and Troy Seals. Universal promoted Raven and all the other acts on its roster through a multiple-artist performance hosted by Charlie Chase at Fan Fair (now CMA Music Festival) in June 1989.

In December 1989, Bowen closed the Universal label to become president of Capitol Records' Nashville division, to which Raven and several other former Universal artists were transferred. Following this transfer, Capitol would issue three more singles from Temporary Sanity. First was "Sooner or Later", which was co-written by husband-and-wife team Bill LaBounty and Beckie Foster, and previously cut by The Forester Sisters on their album You Again. Both this song and follow-up "Island" placed within the top ten of Hot Country Songs in 1990, but "Zydeco Lady" became his first single since 1979 not to reach top 40 on that chart. Jason Ankeny of Allmusic called the album a "mixed bag", referring to "Island" as a "moody ballad" but calling the sound of "Bayou Boys" "hamfisted". Billboard published a positive review of "Sooner or Later" which described it as a "pounding, rollicking number" that "should propel him back to those same chart heights".

Another album for Capitol Nashville, Right for the Flight, followed in 1991. It accounted for two singles: "Rock Me in the Rhythm of Your Love" (co-written by Robert Earl Keen) and "Too Much Candy for a Dime", which were both unsuccessful on the charts. Also included on the album was "Cajun Song", which featured Doug Kershaw on duet vocals and accordion. The Ottawa Citizen writer Susan Beyer reviewed the album with favor, noting that it continued to display his Cajun music influences, while considering the latter half of the album "weightier" and more upbeat than the first half. Following the poor chart performance of the album's singles, Raven was dropped from Capitol's roster in September 1991.

=== 1994-present: Independent ===
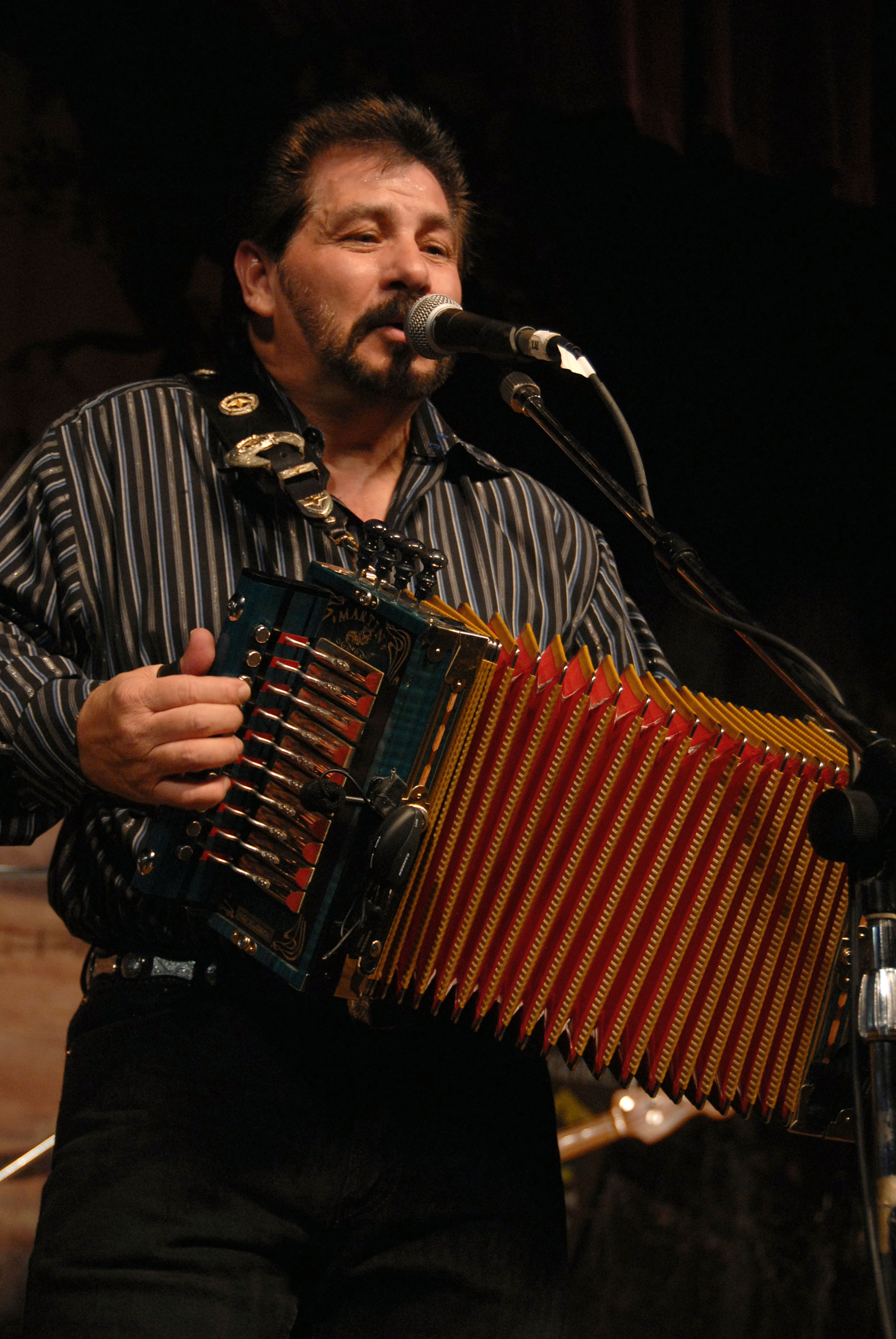
Raven collaborated with Jo-El Sonnier on the 1996 album Cookin' Cajun.

His next album, Wild Eyed and Crazy, was released on Intersound Records in 1994. The album included five new tracks, plus re-recordings of eight of his previous singles. The book MusicHound Country described this album as "an album of reworked hits that sound pretty much like they did originally, supplemented by new, decidedly lackluster material." This was followed by Cookin' Cajun, a collaboration with fellow Cajun country musician Jo-El Sonnier which was issued in 1996. The album included renditions of Raven's "I'm Gonna Get You" and "Colinda", along with Sonnier's "Tear Stained Letter" and "No More One More Time". Music critic Stephen Thomas Erlewine called it "a good-natured record that is a lot of fun while it's playing".

While he continued to record independently, Capitol Records retained the rights to works he had recorded under their tenure. This culminated in the 1997 compilation 20 Favorites, consisting of singles, album cuts, and previously unreleased content. The compilation included two singles: "Johnny's Got a Pistol" and "Somebody's Tearin' the Flag", the latter of which was previously found on Right for the Flight. Both of these songs drew minor media attention to Raven, as many radio stations took "Johnny's Got a Pistol" out of rotation in the wake of various school shootings, while television network CMT refused to air the video for "Somebody's Tearin' the Flag" due to concerns that the song did not fit the network's intended programming demographics. At the time, Raven felt that the songs' failures were due to a preconception that artists of his age were not seen as suitable for mainstream country radio, combined with concerns over political correctness. Despite the lack of radio and television success from the singles, Raven promoted them through performances at an American Legion convention in Chattanooga, Tennessee, on Flag Day (June 14), and as part of Nashville's Independence Day (July 4) festivities. Also in 1997, The Bellamy Brothers featured both Raven and Sonnier on their single "Catahoula".

In 2001, Raven released Living in Black & White on the independent RMG Records. The album was produced by Ron Chancey, and contributing writers included Frank J, Myers, Earl Thomas Conley, and Lonestar lead vocalist Richie McDonald. One of the songs on the album, "Coldest Fire", was a song that Raven had begun writing in 1987 at the encouragement of Gant, but found himself unable to finish for a long period following Gant's death that same year. One single from the album, "Cowboys Don't Cry", charted at number 60 on Hot Country Songs. Raven has continued to perform throughout the 21st century, including multiple appearances on the Grand Ole Opry. Raven also co-wrote two songs on Toby Keith's 2011 album Clancy's Tavern, and made a cameo appearance at one of Keith's concerts in July 2017. In 2018, Raven released a bluegrass album called All Grassed Up, which features a mix of new songs and re-recordings of existing material, with accompaniment from the bluegrass band Carolina Road.

== Musical styles ==
Raven's musical style is defined largely by his strong influence of Cajun music, along with his lyric-driven songs and distinct vocal delivery. According to Raven, he drew musical influence from his father, who largely listened to country music, but he also drew influence from the prominence of Cajun music in his native Louisiana. An uncredited 1984 article in The Tennessean stated that Raven's style at the time was "characterized by his emotive vocals and musical as well as lyrical hooks." Thomas Goldsmith in The Encyclopedia of Country Music wrote that Raven's style was defined by "direct, soulful singing, skillful songwriting, and Cajun heritage." Many of his songs have also displayed influences of reggae and Caribbean music, such as the reggae-influenced guitar riffs played by session guitarist Reggie Young on "I Should've Called", and the "Caribbean sway" described by Newport News Daily Press writer Billy Warden in a review of "Joe Knows How to Live". Joe Edwards of the Associated Press said that Raven "has a deep, masculine voice that pours out incisive songs in a style he describes as 'Cajun reggae, Cajun Caribbean, electric Cajun.'" Similarly, Susan Beyer wrote in a review of Right for the Flight that "[h]is voice has a soulful edge, with a nice strip of grit right in the middle" and said that "instead of whomping us from the first beats with accordions and Cajun calls, he finds the delicacy in the Cajun legacy."

== Influence on other artists ==
Several of Raven's compositions were successful for other artists. Among his early successes as a songwriter were four top-ten hits between 1971 and 1975: "Country Green" and "Touch the Morning" both by Don Gibson, "Sometimes I Talk in My Sleep" by Randy Cornor, and "I Don't Wanna Talk It Over Anymore" by Connie Smith. Two cuts from Eyes were later recorded by other artists: Merle Haggard covered "Dealin' with the Devil" on his 1981 live album Rainbow Stew Live at Anaheim Stadium, and Waylon Jennings covered "Sweet Mother Texas" on his 1986 album of the same name. In addition, The Oak Ridge Boys reached top five on Hot Country Songs in 1982 with Raven's composition "Thank God for Kids". He had written and recorded the song while still on ABC, but the label chose not to release it at the time due to executives considering it unsuitable as a single. Raven's version of the song later appeared on a 1984 compilation also titled Thank God for Kids; this consisted of singles and other material he had recorded while still on ABC, and was issued by MCA Records which had acquired ABC in 1979. Raven later said that the success of The Oak Ridge Boys cut was a factor in his choosing to resume his career after his contract with Elektra ended.

== Personal life ==
Raven has been married twice. His first wife was the former Gayle Breaux, whom he married in 1966. The couple had two children: Ryan and Coby, the former of whom was the inspiration for the song "Thank God for Kids". His second wife is named Sheila, and the two helped launch the RMG label in 2001.

== Discography ==
=== Studio albums ===
- That Cajun Country Sound (1973)
- This Is Eddy Raven (1976)
- Eyes (1980)
- Desperate Dreams (1981)
- I Could Use Another You (1984)
- Love and Other Hard Times (1985)
- Right Hand Man (1986)
- Temporary Sanity (1989)
- Right for the Flight (1991)
- Wild Eyed and Crazy (1994)
- Cookin' Cajun (with Jo-El Sonnier) (1996)
- Living in Black and White (2001)
- All Grassed Up (2018)

=== Billboard number-one hits ===
- "I Got Mexico" (1 week, 1984)
- "Shine, Shine, Shine" (1 week, 1987)
- "I'm Gonna Get You" (1 week, 1988)
- "Joe Knows How to Live" (1 week, 1988)
- "In a Letter to You" (1 week, 1989)
- "Bayou Boys" (1 week, 1989)
