= Sometimes a Lady =

Single by Eddy Raven

from the album Right Hand Man
- B-side: "Just for the Sake of the Thrill"
- Released: May 31, 1986
- Genre: Country pop, pop rock
- Length: 3:14
- Label: RCA
- Songwriter(s): Eddy Raven, Frank J. Myers
- Producer(s): Paul Worley, Eddy Raven

Eddy Raven singles chronology
| "You Should Have Been Gone by Now" (1986) | "Sometimes a Lady" (1986) | "Right Hand Man" (1986) |

"Sometimes a Lady" is a song co-written and recorded by American country music artist Eddy Raven. It was released in May 1986 as the first single from the album Right Hand Man. The song reached #3 on the Billboard Hot Country Singles & Tracks chart. It was written by Raven and Frank J. Myers.

== Chart performance ==
| Chart (1986) | Peak position |
|---|---|
| US Hot Country Songs (Billboard) | 3 |
| Canadian RPM Country Tracks | 2 |
