= You Should Have Been Gone by Now =

Single by Eddy Raven

from the album Love and Other Hard Times
- B-side: "We Robbed Trains"
- Released: December 7, 1985
- Genre: Country
- Length: 3:24
- Label: RCA
- Songwriter(s): Eddy Raven, Don Pfrimmer, Frank J. Myers
- Producer(s): Paul Worley, Eddy Raven

Eddy Raven singles chronology
"I Wanna Hear It from You" (1985)	"You Should Have Been Gone by Now" (1985)	"Sometimes a Lady" (1986)

"You Should Have Been Gone by Now" is a song co-written and recorded by American country music artist Eddy Raven. It was released in December 1985 as the third single from the album Love and Other Hard Times. The song reached #3 on the Billboard Hot Country Singles & Tracks chart. It was written by Raven, Don Pfrimmer and Frank J. Myers.

== Chart performance ==
Chart (1985–1986)	Peak position
US Hot Country Songs (Billboard)	3
Canadian RPM Country Tracks	3
