= Walt Aldridge =

American singer-songwriter (1955–2025)

- Born: James Walton Aldridge Jr. November 12, 1955
- Origin: Florence, Alabama, U.S.
- Died: November 19, 2025 (aged 70)
- Genres: Country
- Occupations: Songwriter; record producer
- Instruments: Vocals; guitar
- Years active: 1980s–2025
- Formerly of: The Shooters

James Walton Aldridge Jr. (November 12, 1955 – November 19, 2025) was an American musician, singer, songwriter, engineer and record producer.

Aldridge was known primarily as a Muscle Shoals songwriter, having had songs recorded by a diverse group of artists from Lou Reed to Reba McEntire over a period of six decades. His hit country songs include the Number One hits "(There's) No Gettin' Over Me" by Ronnie Milsap (1981), "Holding Her and Loving You" by Earl Thomas Conley (1983), "Modern Day Bonnie and Clyde" by Travis Tritt (2000), and "I Loved Her First" (2006) by Heartland. He has been inducted to both The Nashville Songwriters Hall of Fame and The Alabama Music Hall of Fame.

In the late 1980s, Aldridge sang lead vocals in The Shooters, a country band which charted seven singles for Epic Records.

Aldridge worked for 17 years at Fame Recording Studio in Muscle Shoals, Alabama, as a producer, songwriter and back-up musician. He died on November 19, 2025, at the age of 70.
