= I Got Mexico =

Single by Eddy Raven

from the album I Could Use Another You
- B-side: "Love Burning Down"
- Released: February 1984 (U.S.)
- Recorded: January 1984
- Genre: Country
- Length: 2:27
- Label: RCA
- Songwriters: Frank J. Myers and Eddy Raven
- Producers: Paul Worley and Eddy Raven

Eddy Raven singles chronology
"San Antonio Nights" (1982)	"I Got Mexico" (1984)	"I Could Use Another You" (1984)

"I Got Mexico" is a song co-written and recorded by American country music artist Eddy Raven. It was released in January 1984 as the first single from the album I Could Use Another You. Co-written with Frank J. Myers, the song was Raven's first No. 1 hit on the Billboard Hot Country Singles chart in June 1984, and spent a total of thirteen weeks in the top 40 of the country chart.

The song became the first No. 1 produced or co-produced by Paul Worley, who had primarily been known as a session guitarist and a songwriter. Worley had previously produced hit singles for Gary Morris and The Nitty Gritty Dirt Band, but he would become better known later as the producer of Martina McBride, and bands such as the Dixie Chicks, The Band Perry and Lady Antebellum.

== Charts ==
=== Weekly charts ===
Chart (1984)	Peak position
US Hot Country Songs (Billboard)	1
Canadian RPM Country Tracks	1

=== Year-end charts ===
Chart (1984)	Position
US Hot Country Songs (Billboard)	7
