= Frank J. Myers =

American singer-songwriter

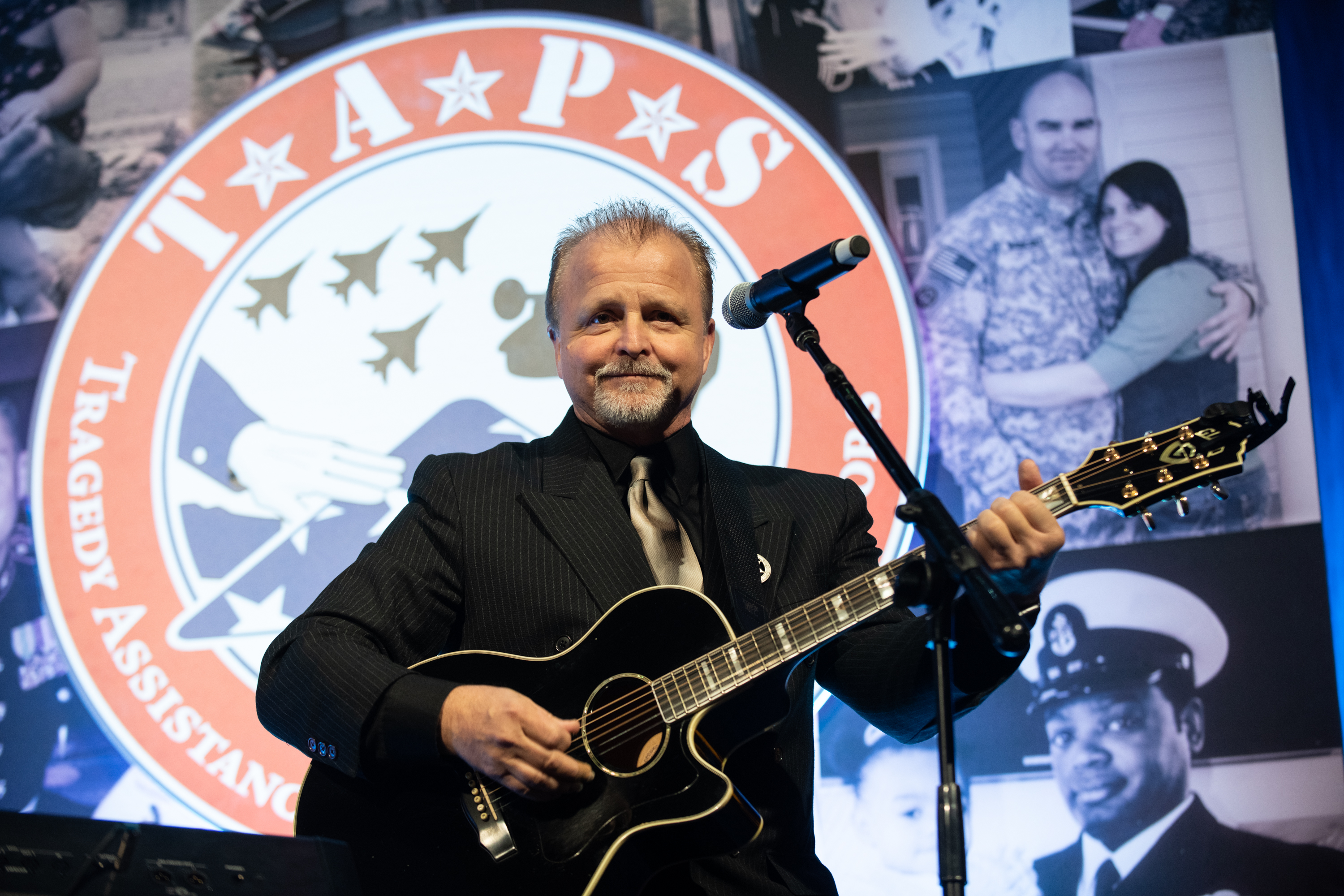
- Frank Myers in 2019

Background information
- Born: Frank Joseph Myers; July 3, 1957 (age 68); Dayton, Ohio, United States
- Origin: Country
- Occupations: Singer-songwriter, producer
- Instruments: Vocals, guitar
- Years active: 1981–present
- Labels: FJM
- Formerly of: Baker & Myers
- Website: www.frankmyersmusic.com

Frank Joseph Myers (born July 3, 1957 in Dayton, Ohio) is an American country music singer, songwriter, and record producer. He has received multiple awards including a Grammy for "Best Country Song" which he and frequent songwriting partner Gary Baker (formerly of The Shooters) received in 1995 for the song "I Swear". In his career, he has written songs for John Michael Montgomery, Eddie Rabbitt, Crystal Gayle, Lonestar and others. He has also recorded two albums, "Baker & Myers" in 1995 and "Scrapbook" in 2006. Myers was inducted into the Ohio Country Music Hall Of Fame 7/26/2025 and is a 3 time Nashville Songwriter Hall Of Fame nominee

== Biography ==
=== Family ===
Frank is the son of Melvin "Pee Wee" Myers (1923–1984) and Eva Riggs. Frank married Belinda in 1980 and has 2 sons Josh and Nick, and a daughter, Jessica. Frank has 2 brothers Melvin and Doug and 2 sisters Betty and Joyce.

=== Early years ===
Frank J. Myers grew up in Dayton, Ohio and graduated from Northridge High School. He returns yearly to hold a concert "Country on the 'Ridge" as a fundraiser for the school's Alumni Hall of Fame. His father, Melvin "Pee Wee" Myers, was a champion fiddle player and singer who taught Frank how to play the guitar. Frank started performing at age 11. After winning a local contest called StarTrail he started opening shows at Dayton's Hara Arena. He still has close ties with the community.

At 14 he guest-starred on the Porter Wagoner TV show. Frank and his brother Melvin Jr. formed a group called "Country Earth" with Paul Barton and Ted Hartman. During his time in Country Earth he met his wife Belinda Watkins. They married on June 7, 1980.

=== Nashville ===
In 1981, Myers and his wife moved to Nashville, Tennessee to pursue his career in the music business. Myers was hired by Eddy Raven as a guitar player. He later became the band leader and road manager for Raven. It was within this time while working for Raven that Myers started writing, playing, and co-producing songs. They produced two number ones, five number twos, and three top ten songs. These include "I Got Mexico", "Bayou Boys", "You Should've Been Gone By Now", and "Sometimes A Lady".

In 1982, Myers wrote "You and I" for his wife. It became his first hit single, recorded as a duet by Eddie Rabbitt and Crystal Gayle. "You and I" was the number one country song for four weeks, number two AC for two weeks, and number seven Pop for 4 weeks. While working for Raven, Myers met Gary Baker, with whom he later form the songwriting and recording duo Baker & Myers.

Myers left Raven in 1990 to play for Marie Osmond. He was also able to get Baker a job with Marie playing bass after Gary's band The Shooters disbanded. It was during this time that Frank and Gary's songwriting flourished. They had their first number one together in 1993 called "Once Upon a Lifetime" by Alabama.

In 1987, Frank and Gary wrote the song "I Swear" which was recorded by John Michael Montgomery and All-4-One in 1994. "I Swear" has received numerous awards including a Grammy Award for "Country song of the year" and A.C.M. Award for Single and Song of the Year along with going number one in numerous countries.

In 1995, Myers and Gary signed and recorded a record for MCG/Curb Records as Baker & Myers. Although Baker & Myers never recorded after the release of that album, Myers and Gary have continued their careers as songwriters.

In 2001, Myers co-wrote two number ones, "I'm_Already_There", BMI's 2002 Country Song of the year, and "My Front Porch Looking In" for Lonestar.

In 2006, Myers produced his first solo album, Scrapbook, for FJM Productions. It is an album of hit songs Myers has written over the years and sung by Frank himself. The first song, "You and I", Myers sings with Crystal Gayle who originally sang it with Eddie Rabbitt.

In 2008, Myers wrote seven songs and produced Richie McDonald's album I Turn to You and also co-produced his Christmas CD If Everyday Could Be Christmas. As of late, he continues to work with other artists writing and producing songs.

In 2015 Myers and Billy Montana wrote and recorded a song, entitled "I’m Here For You", to benefit T.A.P.S.

== Filmography ==
Year	Title	Role	Notes
2008	Gone Country (Episode No. 2.5)	Himself	TV series Music/Reality-TV
2008	Gone Country (Episode No. 2.2)	Himself	TV series Music/Reality-TV

== Discography ==
- List of songs written by Frank J. Myers

=== Albums ===
==== Scrapbook (2006) ====
1. "You and I" (with Special Guest Crystal Gayle) – 3:58
2. "I Got Mexico" – 2:26
3. "You Should've Been Gone by Now" – 3:26
4. "Once Upon a Lifetime" – 4:02
5. "T.L.C.A.S.A.P." – 3:27
6. "Come In Out of the Pain" – 3:29
7. "Sometimes a Lady" – 3:17
8. "I Swear" – 4:21
9. "My Front Porch Looking In" – 3:22
10. "I'm Already There" – 3:54
11. "What Say You" – 3:29

=== List of singles written by Frank Myers ===
Year	Title	Artlst
1982	"You and I"	Eddie Rabbitt with Crystal Gayle
1984	"I Got Mexico"	Eddy Raven
1985	"You Should Have Been Gone by Now"	Eddy Raven
1986	"Sometimes a Lady"	Eddy Raven
1987	"You're Never Too Old for Young Love"	Eddy Raven
1989	"Bayou Boys"	Eddy Raven
1992	"Come In Out of the Pain"	Doug Stone
1993	"Once Upon a Lifetime"	Alabama
1994	"T.L.C. A.S.A.P."	Alabama
1994	"I Swear"	John Michael Montgomery
1994	"I Swear"	All-4-One
1995	"What Kind of Man (Walks on a Woman)"	Marie Osmond
1995	"These Arms"	Baker & Myers
1996	"Years from Here"	Baker & Myers
1999	"One Honest Heart"	Reba McEntire
2001	"I'm Already There"	Lonestar
2003	"My Front Porch Looking In"	Lonestar
2004	"If I Could Only Bring You Back"	Joe Diffie
2004	"What Say You"	Travis Tritt with John Mellencamp
2005	"Class Reunion (That Used to Be Us)"	Lonestar
2007	"Last Train Running"	Whiskey Falls
2009	"I Want My Life Back"	Bucky Covington
2009	"Stuck"	Ash Bowers
2010	"I Swear"	Gary Baker feat. POPSTARS
2011	"Tomorrow"	Chris Young
2011	"I Still Believe in That"	Ash Bowers

== See also ==
- Baker & Myers
