= Billy Currington discography =

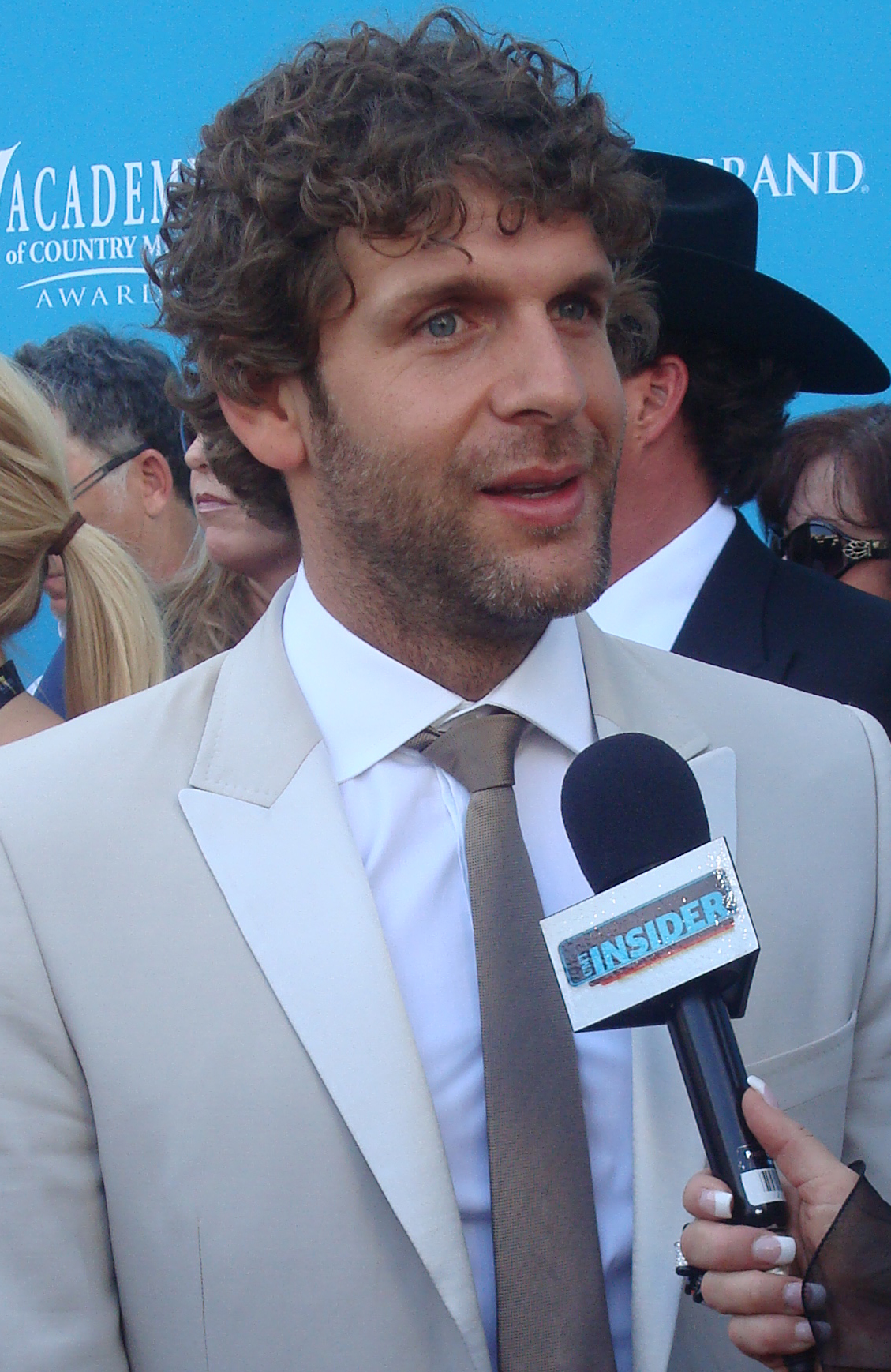
- Studio albums: 8
- Compilation albums: 1
- Singles: 22
- Music videos: 13
- Number-one singles: 11

American country music singer and songwriter Billy Currington has released seven studio albums and one compilation album, all via Mercury Nashville. He has also released twenty singles to country radio, eleven of which reached number one on the U.S. Billboard Hot Country Songs or Country Airplay charts: "Must Be Doin' Somethin' Right", "Good Directions", "People Are Crazy", "That's How Country Boys Roll", "Pretty Good at Drinkin' Beer", "Let Me Down Easy", "Hey Girl", "We Are Tonight", "Don't It", "It Don't Hurt Like It Used To", and "Do I Make You Wanna". Three other singles have made the Top 10 on the charts as well. Mr. Currington has sold over 4 million albums and 24 million singles in the United States.

== Albums ==
=== Studio albums ===
| Title | Album details | Peak chart positions | | | Certifications | Sales |
| Title | Album details | US | US Country | CAN | Certifications | Sales |
|---|---|---|---|---|---|---|
| Billy Currington | Release date: September 30, 2003; Label: Mercury Nashville; Formats: CD, digital download | 107 | 17 | — | | |
| Doin' Somethin' Right | Release date: October 18, 2005; Label: Mercury Nashville; Formats: CD, digital download | 11 | 2 | — | US: 2× Platinum | |
| Little Bit of Everything | Release date: October 14, 2008; Label: Mercury Nashville; Formats: CD, digital download | 13 | 2 | — | US: Platinum | |
| Enjoy Yourself | Release date: September 21, 2010; Label: Mercury Nashville; Formats: CD, digital download | 9 | 2 | — | US: Platinum | US: 329,489 |
| We Are Tonight | Release date: September 17, 2013; Label: Mercury Nashville; Formats: CD, digital download | 10 | 5 | — | | |
| Summer Forever | Release date: June 2, 2015; Label: Mercury Nashville; Formats: CD, digital download | 15 | 3 | 24 | US: Gold | US: 68,500 |
| Intuition | Release date: August 6, 2021; Label: Mercury Nashville; Formats: Digital download | — | — | — | | |
| King of the World | Release date: October 24, 2025; Label: Mercury Nashville; Formats: Digital download | — | — | — | | |
"—" denotes releases that did not chart

=== Compilation albums ===
| Title | Album details | Peak chart positions | |
| Title | Album details | US | US Country |
|---|---|---|---|
| Icon | Release date: March 22, 2011; Label: Mercury Nashville; Formats: CD, digital download | 104 | 22 |

== Singles ==
=== 2000s ===
| Year | Title | Peak chart positions | | | | Certifications | Album |
| Year | Title | US | US Country Songs | CAN | CAN Country | Certifications | Album |
|---|---|---|---|---|---|---|---|
| 2003 | "Walk a Little Straighter" | 67 | 8 | — | — | | Billy Currington |
| 2004 | "I Got a Feelin'" | 50 | 5 | — | 9 | US: Gold | Billy Currington |
| 2005 | "Must Be Doin' Somethin' Right" | 39 | 1 | — | 4 | US: 4× Platinum | Doin' Somethin' Right |
| 2006 | "Why, Why, Why" | 99 | 13 | — | 30 | | Doin' Somethin' Right |
| 2006 | "Good Directions" | 42 | 1 | 67 | 5 | US: 4× Platinum | Doin' Somethin' Right |
| 2007 | "Tangled Up" | — | 30 | — | — | | Non-album single |
| 2008 | "Don't" | 52 | 2 | 91 | 14 | US: Gold | Little Bit of Everything |
| 2009 | "People Are Crazy" | 27 | 1 | 48 | 2 | US: 4× Platinum | Little Bit of Everything |
| 2009 | "That's How Country Boys Roll" | 57 | 1 | 67 | 1 | US: Gold | Little Bit of Everything |
"—" denotes releases that did not chart

=== 2010s ===
| Year | Title | Peak chart positions | | | | | Certifications | Album |
| Year | Title | US | US Country Songs | US Country Airplay | CAN | CAN Country | Certifications | Album |
|---|---|---|---|---|---|---|---|---|
| 2010 | "Pretty Good at Drinkin' Beer" | 41 | 1 | | 50 | 1 | US: 2× Platinum | Enjoy Yourself |
| 2010 | "Let Me Down Easy" | 46 | 1 | | 71 | 3 | US: 2× Platinum | Enjoy Yourself |
| 2011 | "Love Done Gone" | 58 | 11 | | 83 | 6 | US: Gold | Enjoy Yourself |
| 2011 | "Like My Dog" | —^{A} | 24 | | — | 33 | | Enjoy Yourself |
| 2013 | "Hey Girl" | 39 | 5 | 1 | 58 | 18 | US: Platinum; CAN: Gold | We Are Tonight |
| 2013 | "We Are Tonight" | 60 | 12 | 1 | 87 | 17 | US: Platinum | We Are Tonight |
| 2014 | "Don't It" | 44 | 4 | 1 | 46 | 1 | US: Platinum | Summer Forever |
| 2015 | "Drinkin' Town with a Football Problem" | — | 41 | 30 | — | — | | Summer Forever |
| 2016 | "It Don't Hurt Like It Used To" | 44 | 3 | 1 | 77 | 1 | US: Platinum | Summer Forever |
| 2016 | "Do I Make You Wanna" | 47 | 5 | 1 | — | 3 | US: 2× Platinum | Summer Forever |
| 2017 | "Wake Me Up" | — | — | 45 | — | — | | Summer Forever |
| 2018 | "Bring It On Over" | — | 44 | 29 | — | — | | Non-album singles |
| 2019 | "Details" | — | 49 | 32 | — | — | | Non-album singles |
"—" denotes releases that did not chart

- ^{A} "Like My Dog" did not enter the Hot 100, but charted at number 2 on the Bubbling Under Hot 100 Singles.

=== As a featured artist ===
| Year | Title | Peak chart positions | | | | | Certifications | Album |
| Year | Title | US | US Country Songs | US AC | CAN Country | CAN AC | Certifications | Album |
|---|---|---|---|---|---|---|---|---|
| 2004 | "Party for Two" (Shania Twain with Billy Currington) | 58 | 7 | 16 | 3 | 6 | US: Platinum | Greatest Hits |

=== Promotional singles ===
| Year | Title | Album |
|---|---|---|
| 2005 | "When You're Over Him" | Non-album singles |
| 2005 | "One True Friend" | Non-album singles |

== Videography ==
=== Music videos ===
| Year | Title | Director |
|---|---|---|
| 2003 | "Walk a Little Straighter" | Margaret Malandruccolo |
| 2004 | "I Got a Feelin'" | Philip Andelman |
| 2005 | "Must Be Doin' Somethin' Right" | Roger Pistole |
| 2006 | "Why, Why, Why" | Roger Pistole |
| 2008 | "Don't" | The Brads |
| 2009 | "People Are Crazy" | The Brads |
| 2009 | "That's How Country Boys Roll" | Potsy Ponciroli |
| 2010 | "Pretty Good at Drinkin' Beer" | Potsy Ponciroli |
| 2011 | "Let Me Down Easy" | Potsy Ponciroli |
| 2011 | "Love Done Gone" | Potsy Ponciroli |
| 2013 | "Hey Girl" | Kristin Barlowe |
| 2013 | "We Are Tonight" | Kristin Barlowe |
| 2015 | "Don't It" | Peter Zavadil |

=== Guest appearances ===
| Year | Title | Director |
|---|---|---|
| 2004 | "Party for Two" (with Shania Twain) | Marcus Ruboy |
| 2012 | "Just for You" (with Lionel Richie) | Kevin Defreitas |
