= Shy Carter =

American songwriter

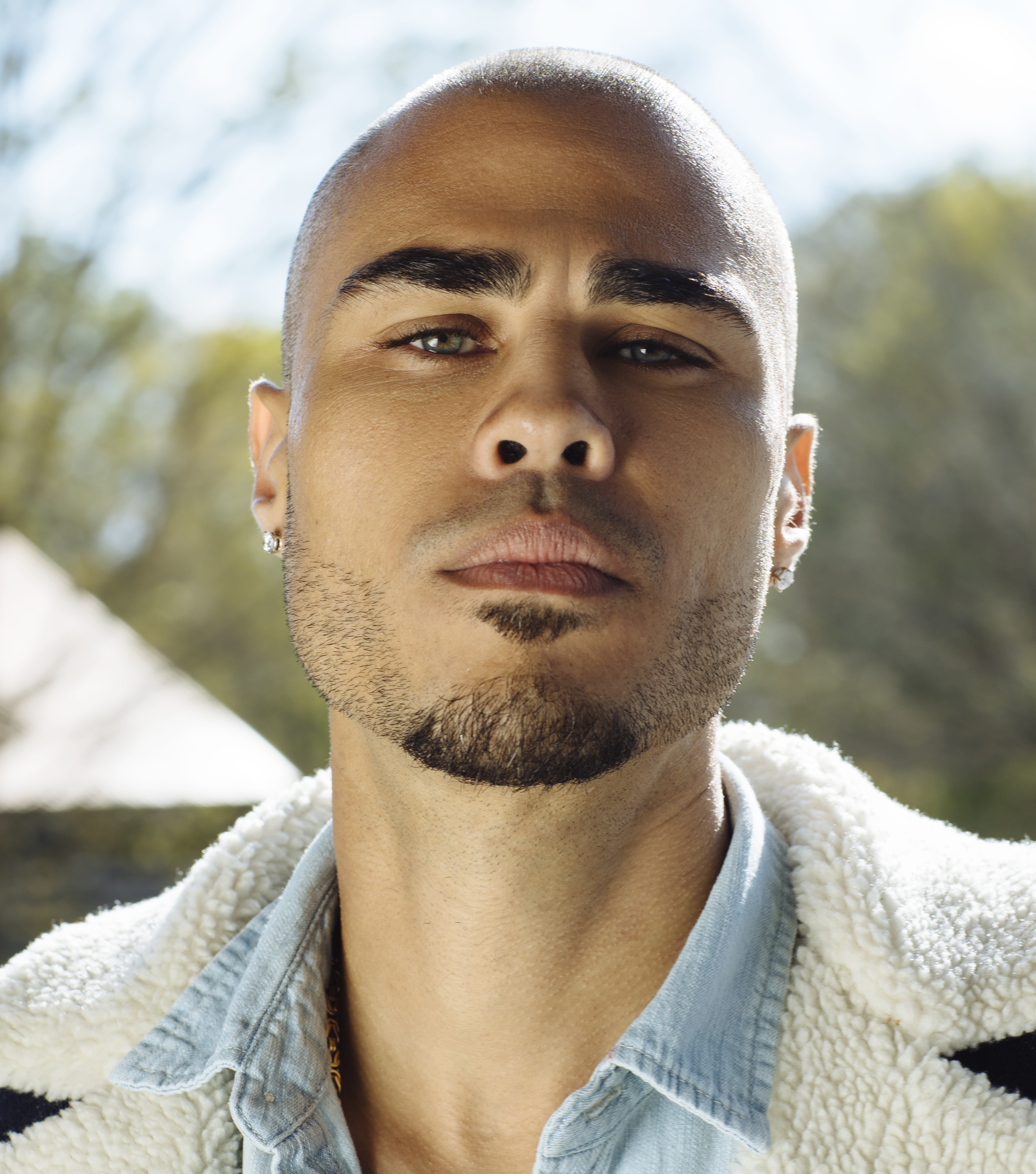
- Carter in 2020

Background information
- Born: Blake Anthony Carter; August 21, 1984 (age 41); Memphis, Tennessee, U.S.
- Genres: Pop; R&B; country
- Occupations: Songwriter; record producer; rapper; singer
- Years active: 2007–present

Blake Anthony Carter (born August 21, 1984), known professionally as Shy Carter, is an American songwriter, record producer, rapper and singer. He has written songs for Meghan Trainor, Jason Derulo, Charlie Puth, Faith Hill, Tim McGraw, Keith Urban, Kane Brown and Billy Currington. He co-wrote Charlie Puth's 2015 hit "One Call Away" which peaked atop the Billboard's Adult Top 40 chart, as well as Rob Thomas' 2009 single "Someday", which also peaked the chart and spent over 40 weeks in its top 5. He co-wrote Sugarland's 2010 single, "Stuck Like Glue", which entered the Billboard Hot 100 at number 20 and became the 11th most downloaded country music song of all time. As a recording artist, he guest appeared on Latin singer Gloria Trevi's song "Habla Blah Blah", and as a lead artist, his 2015 song "Bring it Back" entered the Billboard's Rhythmic chart.

== Career ==
=== Beginnings ===
Carter grew up in the suburbs of Atlanta, and then moved to Memphis, TN. He played saxophone in church and with bands on Beale Street. In 2007, Shy Carter was discovered by talent manager Courtney Benson. Carter signed a production deal with Benson's former client Nelly. A year later, he signed a publishing agreement with Primary Wave Entertainment.

=== 2009–2014 ===
In September 2009, Rob Thomas released "Someday", co-written with Carter, and became Rob Thomas's third career No. 1 on Billboard's Adult Top 40 chart. Within a couple of years, he co-wrote "Stuck Like Glue" with Kevin Griffin (Better Than Ezra), Jennifer Nettles and Kristian Bush of Sugarland. It was released in July 2010, selling almost three million copies and became the 11th most downloaded country music song of all time, and the highest debut for a country group or duo on the Hot 100, debuting at No. 20. He co-wrote, co-produced, and was featured alongside Ray J on Mr. Midwest's song, "Shorty Is A Weirdo", which was released on March 20, 2011. In May 2012, Haley Reinhart released Listen Up! with the song, "Let's Run Away" which he co-wrote and produced. Carter co-wrote and co-produced the song, "Don't Keep in Touch", from Marcus Canty's EP, This...Is Marcus Canty. In 2013, he was a part of two songs on the country artist Billy Currington's album We Are Tonight, on which he co-wrote, produced and sang background on "Hallelujah" as well as rapped a verse on "Banana Pancakes". Carter appeared on Gloria Trevi's album, De Pelicula, singing a rap verse on "Habla Blah Blah". The song reached No. 1 on the Adult Pop Songs on the Billboard charts. He was also on the song "Mr. Almost", from Meghan Trainor's debut, three-time platinum studio album, Title.

=== 2015–present ===
Shy released his single "Bring It Back" under RCA Records in 2015. It debuted on Sirius XM Hits 1 radio, on their weekend show, "Hitbound", on July 25, 2015, and "graduated" to their "Weekend Countdown" on September 19, 2015. The song hit the Top 40 of the Billboard Rhythmic charts. Shy wrote Jamie Foxx's single "Baby's In Love" feat. Kid Ink which was released in May 2015. Carter appeared on DJ Quik and Problem's Rosecrans EP on the track "A New Nite". Shy also appeared on Charlie Puth's song "As You Are", from Puth's debut studio album, Nine Track Mind and co-wrote the double platinum hit single "One Call Away". Billy Currington's number one "It Don't Hurt Like It Used To" (released in February 2016) was also co-written by Shy. Shy co-wrote Faith Hill and Tim McGraw's single "Speak to a Girl" off their duets album as well as Tim McGraw's single "Way Down". Additionally, Carter co-wrote Kane Brown's hit tracks "Heaven" and "Good As You". He is also featured on two songs on Keith Urban's album, Graffiti U, and is credited as a writer on Keith Urban's song, "God Whispered Your Name" (released in February 2020).

== Discography ==
=== Singles ===
- "Good Love" (2020) (written by: Shy Carter, Micah Carter, James Slater, Carlo, Colasacco) (produced by David Garcia)
- "Beer with My Friends" featuring Cole Swindell and David Lee Murphy (2021)

=== Songwriting credits ===
Title	Year	Artist	Album	Written with
Someday	2009	Rob Thomas	Cradlesong	Matt Serletic, Rob Thomas
Stuck Like Glue	2010	Sugarland	The Incredible Machine	Jennifer Nettles, Kevin Griffin, Kristian Bush
Banana Pancakes	2013	Billy Currington	We Are Tonight	Jack Johnson
Hallelujah	2013	Billy Currington	We Are Tonight	Brad Warren, Brett Warren
It Don't Hurt Like It Used To	2015	Billy Currington	Summer Forever	Billy Currington, Cary Barlowe
Baby's In Love	2015	Jamie Foxx (feat. Kid Ink)	Hollywood: A Story of a Dozen Roses	Lauren Christy, Brian Todd Collins, Jacob Luttrell, Will Lobban-Bean
Try Me	2015	Jason Derulo (feat. Jennifer Lopez & Matoma)	Everything Is 4	Lindy Robbins, David Ritz, Jason Desrouleaux, Marvin Gaye, Odell Brown
Mr. Almost	2015	Meghan Trainor (feat. Shy Carter)	Title (Deluxe)	Meghan Trainor, Jesse Frasure
One Call Away	2016	Charlie Puth	Nine Track Mind	Breyan Isaac, Charlie Puth, Justin Franks, Matthew Prime, Maureen McDonald
As You Are	2016	Charlie Puth (feat. Shy Carter)	Nine Track Mind	Charlie Puth, George Tizzard, Jack Martello, Rick Parkhouse
Elevated	2016	Citizen Way	2.0	Ben Calhoun, Colby Wedgeworth, Nate Welch
Speak to a Girl	2017	Tim McGraw & Faith Hill	The Rest of Our Life	Dave Gibson, Joe Spargur
Heaven	2017	Kane Brown	Kane Brown (Deluxe Edition)	Lindsay Rimes, Matt McGinn
Figures	2017	Jessie Reyez	Kiddo	Jessie Reyez, Bjorn Djupstrom, Tobias Frelin
Precious	2017	Aston Merrygold (feat. Shy Carter)	N/A	Brett Farkas, Joe Ayoub
Never Comin Down	2018	Keith Urban	Graffiti U	James Abrahart, Josh Kerr, Keith Urban
My Wave	2018	Keith Urban	Graffiti U	Greg Wells, Keith Urban
Overflow	2018	TobyMac	The Elements	Josh Miller, Toby McKeehan
Good As You	2019	Kane Brown	Experiment Extended	Brock Berryhill, Kane Brown, Taylor Phillips, Will Weatherly
Way Down	2019	Tim McGraw (feat. Shy Carter)	N/A	Craig Wiseman, Tommy Cecil
Say About Me	2019	Chris Janson (feat. Offset)	Real Friends	Chris Janson, Kiari Kendrell, Tommy Cecil
God Whispered Your Name	2020	Keith Urban	The Speed of Now Part 1	Chris August, James Slater, Micah Carter
