= Megan Mullins =

American singer-songwriter

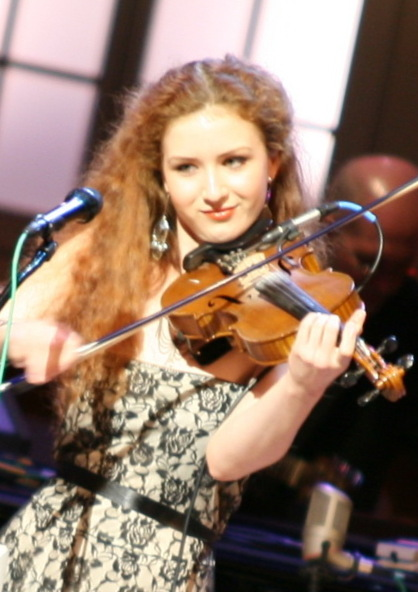
- Mullins performing at the Grand Ole Opry in 2007

Background information
- Born: November 24, 1987 (age 38); Fort Wayne, Indiana, U.S.
- Genres: Country
- Occupation: Singer-songwriter
- Instruments: Vocals, fiddle, mandolin, guitar
- Years active: 2006–present
- Labels: Broken Bow, Stoney Creek

Megan Mullins (born November 24, 1987) is an American country music singer, songwriter, and multi-instrumentalist. At age 18, she made her debut on the country music scene with the single "Ain't What It Used to Be," a Top 40 hit on the Billboard Hot Country Songs charts. Her debut album was originally slated for release in 2006 but was never released.

== Biography ==
Mullins was born in Fort Wayne, Indiana. She began to learn several instruments at an early age, and by age 3, she had won the Indiana State Fair Showmanship award at the State Fiddle Championship. Many of her family members are also professional musicians, most notably her brother Marcus, with whom she performed on the Grand Ole Opry at age 14.

By 2006, she was signed to Broken Bow Records, an independent record label. Her first single, titled "Ain't What It Used to Be" (originally recorded by Billy Currington on his 2003 self-titled debut album) was issued early that year, reaching a peak of No. 32 on the country music charts. A second single, "Cryin' Days," failed to chart at all, and Mullins announced in October 2007 that she would be returning to the studio for further work on the album.

Although the album has not been released, Mullins remained on Broken Bow's roster. In 2008, Mullins recorded a duet with Alabama lead singer Randy Owen (who is also signed to Broken Bow), for his solo debut album One on One. Mullins also plays fiddle in Owen's road band. In April 2009, she switched to Stoney Creek, a sister label also started by the founder of Broken Bow. Her first release for Stoney Creek, "Long Past Gone", made its chart debut in May 2009, and peaked at No. 48 later in the year. A second single for the label, "Tradin' My Halo for Horns," failed to chart. In August 2010, Mullins and Stoney Creek parted ways.

Mullins is married to Tyler Owen, son of Alabama lead singer Randy Owen.

== Discography ==
=== Singles ===
Year	Single	Peak positions	Album
Year	Single	US Country	Album
2006	"Ain't What It Used to Be"	32	Megan Mullins (unreleased)
2007	"Cryin' Days"	—	Megan Mullins (unreleased)
2009	"Long Past Gone"	48	—N/a
2009	"Tradin' My Halo for Horns"	—	—N/a
"—" denotes releases that failed to chart

=== Guest singles ===
Year	Single	Artist	Album
2009	"Holding Everything"	Randy Owen	One on One

=== Music videos ===
Year	Single	Director
2006	"Ain't What It Used to Be"	Kristin Barlowe
2009	"Long Past Gone"	Curt Aponovich
