= All Those Yesterdays =

- "All Those Yesterdays", song by Pearl Jam from Yield (album)
- "All Those Yesterdays", (Justin Tubb) from The Importance of Being Ernest
- "All Those Yesterdays", (Hanson, Heeney, Masters) from Jennifer Hanson (album)
