= Let Me Down Easy (Billy Currington song) =

Single by Billy Currington

from the album Enjoy Yourself
- Released: October 4, 2010
- Recorded: 2010
- Genre: Country, country soul
- Length: 3:48
- Label: Mercury Nashville
- Songwriters: Mark Nesler; Jennifer Hanson; Marty Dodson
- Producers: Carson Chamberlain; Billy Currington

Billy Currington singles chronology
"Pretty Good at Drinkin' Beer" (2010)	"Let Me Down Easy" (2010)	"Love Done Gone" (2011)

"Let Me Down Easy" is a song written by Mark Nesler, Jennifer Hanson and Marty Dodson and recorded by American country music artist Billy Currington. It was released in October 2010 as the second single from Currington's 2010 album Enjoy Yourself and as the eleventh single of his career. The song became Currington's fourth consecutive and sixth number one hit on the U.S. Billboard Hot Country Songs chart for the week of April 2, 2011.

== Music video ==
The music video was directed by Potsy Ponciroli. It is composed entirely of tour footage, showing Currington performing both at soundcheck, and at the actual show. It was released on March 28, 2011, just before its U.S. country peak of Number One.

== Critical reception ==
Karlie Justus of Engine 145 gave the song a thumbs-up, saying that it was a "sultry sleeper hit" but also saying that she thought it was similar to "Must Be Doin' Somethin' Right" and "Don't". Gary Graff of Billboard also described the song favorably, saying that it had "Lionel Richie-style smoothness".

== Chart performance ==
=== Weekly charts ===
Chart (2010–2011)	Peak position
US Hot Country Songs (Billboard)	1
US Billboard Hot 100	46
Canada Country (Billboard)	3
Canada Hot 100 (Billboard)	71

=== Year-end charts ===
Chart (2011)	Position
US Country Songs (Billboard)	10

=== Decade-end charts ===
Chart (2010–2019)	Position
US Hot Country Songs (Billboard)	34
