= Enjoy Yourself (Billy Currington album) =

Studio album by Billy Currington
- Released: September 21, 2010
- Genre: Country
- Length: 34:05
- Label: Mercury Nashville
- Producer: Carson Chamberlain; Billy Currington

Billy Currington chronology
Little Bit of Everything (2008)	Enjoy Yourself (2010)	Icon (2011)

Singles from Enjoy Yourself
- 1. "Pretty Good at Drinkin' Beer" Released: May 24, 2010; 2. "Let Me Down Easy" Released: October 4, 2010; 3. "Love Done Gone" Released: April 18, 2011; 4. "Like My Dog" Released: October 10, 2011

Enjoy Yourself is the fourth studio album by American country music artist Billy Currington. It was released on September 21, 2010, via Mercury Nashville. Four singles were released from the album, including the Number Ones "Pretty Good at Drinkin' Beer" and "Let Me Down Easy."

== Background ==
In an interview with The Boot, Currington talked about the album, and how if reflects who he is as a person. “It’s a great mix, it reflects who I am. I’m definitely not just one thing. I’m the beach guy, I’m the country guy, I love my dirt roads and fishin’, but I love New York City and L.A. and Miami, too. "It's been a process for this particular project for like five years when I go back through my songs. I've been stashing all these songs that I get pitched every year in this one little spot on my computer – it's probably been more like 10 years of songs now – and so I feel like I'm so stashed up with songs that I didn't need to write or look for them."

== Recording ==
Currington explained the recording behind Enjoy Yourself, saying "This record was about recording songwriter’s songs, I could have gone back and recorded a bunch of mine that I’ve written, but there were a lot of writers I wanted to record, like Shawn and Troy. I had to put their songs on this album.”

== Reception ==
=== Commercial ===
The album debuted at number nine on the U.S. Billboard 200 chart after selling 45,000 copies, becoming his first Top 10 album on that chart. It also peaked at number two on the U.S. Billboard Top Country Albums chart. As of the chart dated June 25, 2011, the album has sold over 329,489 copies in the United States.

=== Critical ===
Professional ratings
Review scores
Source	Rating
Allmusic	3.5/5 stars
Associated Press	(positive)
Billboard	(positive)
Country Weekly	3/5 stars
Entertainment Weekly	(B+)
Parcbench	3.5/4 stars
PopMatters	5/10 stars
Roughstock	3.5/5 stars
The Washington Post	(mixed)
Engine 145	2.5/5 stars

Upon its release, Enjoy Yourself received generally positive reviews from most music critics. At Metacritic, which assigns a normalized rating out of 100 to reviews from mainstream critics, the album received an average score of 68, based on 4 reviews, which indicates "generally favorable reviews".

Matt Bjorke with Roughstock gave it a three and a half out of five star rating, saying that Currington "has perfected his formula; Enjoy Yourself is a mostly jovial affair that really feels like a tight collection of escapist, feel-good music. Stephen Thomas Erlewine with Allmusic also gave it a three and a half out of five star rating, saying "Everything rolls just a little bit too easily [...] its mellow vibes and occasional soft romantic touch feel true to Currington." Greg Victor with Parcbench gave it a 3½ rating, commenting "This album is full of music makes you want to dance and laugh and sing along; this album is the one I put on for my own enjoyment."

The Associated Press' Michael McCall said that "[on] Enjoy Yourself he zeroes in on an easy-going soul vibe, a sound that brings out a likable quality in Currington's Georgia-raised tenor." Bill Friskics-Warren with The Washington Post gave it a mixed review, saying that "[Currington] can pride himself on having made a record with the sort of warmth and intimacy that gives the work of neo-traditionalist elders such as George Strait and Alan Jackson such staying power." He also called the track "Like My Dog" "The only real misstep".

Jessica Phillips with Country Weekly gave it three stars, commented saying that it is "a perfect sleepy and summery soundtrack; this collection largely falls headlong into leisurely tales of drinking and fishing rather than the more spirited or smouldering fare that spurred earlier hits." Blake Boldt with Engine 145 gave it two and a half stars out of five, calling it a "pretty bland modern country album" and said that Currington "is a little too spic-and-span. None of these ten songs is even remotely suspenseful; conflicts and concerns are neatly wrapped up within four minutes." Dave Heaton with PopMatters gave it five out of ten stars, and criticized the songwriting on the album, saying " on a songwriting level, Currington has dropped any real storytelling emphasis or attention to specific details.

== Track listing ==
No.	Title	Writer(s)	Length
1.	"All Day Long"	Frankie Ballard; Dallas Davidson; Ben Hayslip	3:49
2.	"Love Done Gone"	Shawn Camp; Marv Green	3:32
3.	"Pretty Good at Drinkin' Beer"	Troy Jones	3:00
4.	"Until You"	Dave Barnes	4:45
5.	"Like My Dog"	Harley Allen; Scotty Emerick	2:46
6.	"Perfect Day"	Dean Dillon; Dale Dodson; Emerick	2:55
7.	"Let Me Down Easy"	Marty Dodson; Jennifer Hanson; Mark Nesler	3:50
8.	"Bad Day of Fishin'"	Billy Currington; John Scott Sherrill; Emerick	3:04
9.	"Enjoy Yourself"	Bob DiPiero; Emerick; Sherrill	3:00
10.	"Lil' Ol' Lonesome Dixie Town"	Camp; Billy Joe Walker Jr.	3:21

== Personnel ==
Production

- Maggie Berry – Design
- Darryl Bowslaugh – Groomer
- Jason Campbell – Production coordination
- Carson Chamberlain – Producer
- Billy Currington – Producer
- Joe Fisher – A&R
- Luellyn Latocki Hensley – Art direction
- John Kelton – Engineer, mixing
- Ken Love – Mastering
- Lee Moore – Wardrobe
- Karen Naff – Art direction
- Kate Powers – Photography
- Matt Rovey – Engineer
- Brian Wright – A&R
- Stephanie Wright – A&R

Additional musicians

- J. T. Corenflos – Electric guitar (all tracks)
- Billy Currington – Lead vocals (all tracks), background vocals (track 2)
- Smith Curry – Lap steel guitar (track 10)
- Paul Franklin – Steel guitar (all tracks except 8 and 10), Pedabro (track 8)
- Barry Green – Trombone (track 2)
- Wes Hightower – Background vocals (tracks 2,3,5,8-10)
- Paul Leim – Drums (all tracks)
- Brent Mason – Electric guitar (all tracks)
- Steve Patrick – Trumpet (track 2)
- Gary Prim – Hammond B3 organ (tracks 1,7), keyboards (track 4), piano (tracks 1-3,5,8,10), Wurlitzer (tracks 6,9)
- Chris Rodriguez – Background vocals (tracks 1,2,4,6,7)
- W. David Smith – Bass guitar (all tracks except 8), upright bass (track 8)
- Biff Watson – Acoustic guitar (all tracks)

== Chart performance ==
=== Weekly charts ===
Chart (2010)	Peak position
US Billboard 200	9
US Top Country Albums (Billboard)	2

=== Year-end charts ===
Chart (2010)	Position
US Top Country Albums (Billboard)	47
Chart (2011)	Position
US Billboard 200	113
US Top Country Albums (Billboard)	26
Chart (2012)	Position
US Top Country Albums (Billboard)	64

=== Singles ===
Year	Single	Peak chart positions		
Year	Single	US Country	US	CAN
2010	"Pretty Good at Drinkin' Beer"	1	41	50
2010	"Let Me Down Easy"	1	46	71
2011	"Love Done Gone"	11	58	83
2011	"Like My Dog"^{A}	24	102	—
"—" denotes releases that did not chart

- ^{A}Did not enter the Hot 100 but charted on Bubbling Under Hot 100 Singles.

== Certifications ==
Region	Certification	Certified units/sales
United States (RIAA)	Platinum	1,000,000^{‡}
^{‡} Sales+streaming figures based on certification alone.
