= Beautiful Goodbye =

Single by Jennifer Hanson

from the album Jennifer Hanson
- Released: July 29, 2002
- Genre: Country
- Length: 4:19
- Label: Capitol Nashville
- Songwriters: Jennifer Hanson; Kim Patton-Johnston
- Producers: Jennifer Hanson; Greg Droman

Jennifer Hanson singles chronology
"Beautiful Goodbye" (2002)	"This Far Gone" (2003)

"Beautiful Goodbye" is a song co-written and recorded by American country music artist Jennifer Hanson. It was released in July 2002 as the first single from her debut album Jennifer Hanson. The song was written by Hanson and Kim Patton-Johnston.

== History ==
The senior vice president of marketing for Capitol Records' Nashville division at the time, Fletcher Foster, said that the song was "uniquely different and could set her apart from not only all the other new artists but also the acts out there in general." Phyllis Stark of Billboard compared the song to Sheryl Crow.

== Charts ==
"Beautiful Goodbye" debuted at number 58 on the U.S. Billboard Hot Country Songs chart for the week of August 3, 2002.

Chart (2002–2003)	Peak position
US Hot Country Songs (Billboard)	16
US Billboard Hot 100	76
