= Jennifer Hanson =

American musician (born 1973)

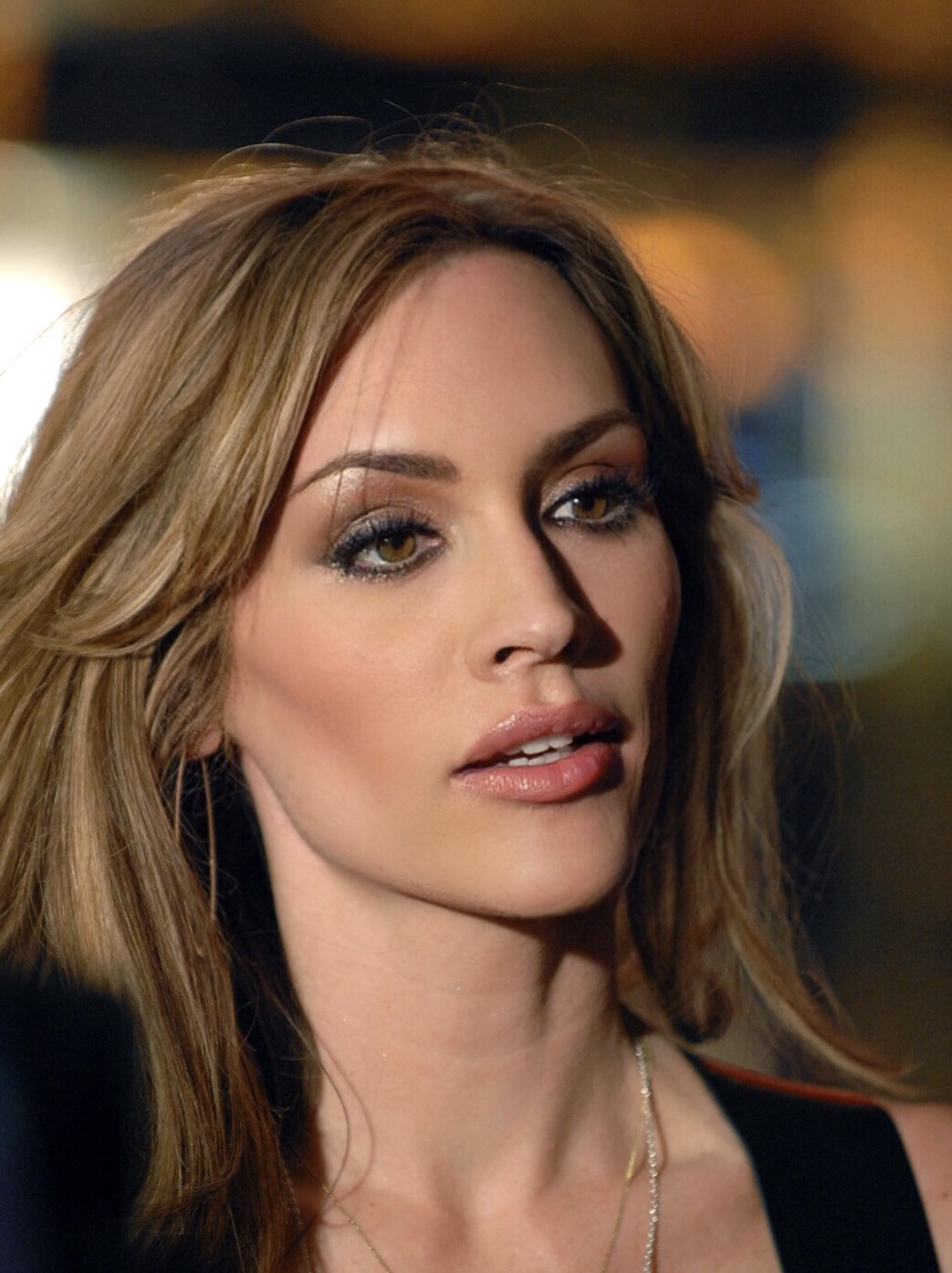
- Hanson in 2020.

Background information
- Born: Jennifer Kathleen Hanson; August 10, 1973 (age 52)
- Origin: La Habra, California, US
- Genres: Country, Pop, Country rock, Indie folk
- Occupation: Singer-songwriter
- Instruments: Vocals, guitar
- Years active: 1996–present
- Labels: Capitol Nashville, Universal South
- Website: jenniferhansonmusic.com

Jennifer Kathleen Hanson (born August 10, 1973) is an American country music artist, songwriter and record producer. She made her artist debut in 2002 with the release of her single "Beautiful Goodbye". The song went on to become a top 20 hit on Billboard's Hot Country Songs reaching #16 in March 2003, the highest-charting debut single by a female country artist for that year. Her self-titled debut album, Jennifer Hanson, was released that same year on Capitol Records to critical acclaim, and in 2003 Hanson was nominated for the Top New Female Vocalist award from the Academy of Country Music. She received a nomination that same year for CMT Breakthrough Video of the Year for her video "Beautiful Goodbye", directed by Trey Fanjoy.

As a songwriter, Hanson has written songs for a number of artists, including Kelly Clarkson, Michelle Branch, Gwyneth Paltrow, Jason Aldean, Rascal Flatts, Tim McGraw, Billy Currington, Jana Kramer, Mickey Guyton, Sister Hazel, Don Williams, Pam Tillis, Vince Gill, Tracy Byrd, The McClymonts, and Dan Tyminski. She co-wrote the #1 Billboard singles "Leave The Pieces" for country duo The Wreckers, as well as "Let Me Down Easy" for Billy Currington. Hanson also co-wrote American Idol finalist, Bucky Covington's Top 5 song "A Different World".

She wrote "Country Strong", the title track from the Gwyneth Paltrow – Tim McGraw film of the same name. Recorded by Gwyneth Paltrow for the movie, the song features Vince Gill and Patty Griffin on background vocals. It was nominated for Best Original Song at the 2010 Satellite Awards.

== Early life ==
Jennifer Kathleen Hanson was born in La Habra, California, on August 10, 1973. She is the daughter of road musician, Larry Hanson and singer-songwriter, Melody Vendrell Hanson. She is also the grandniece of Mexican actress, singer, dancer and vaudevillian, Armida Vendrell, one of the early Latina movie actresses of the 1930s and '40s. Hanson's father toured with pop/soul duo The Righteous Brothers and Bill Medley, during his solo career, in the early to mid-'80s. It was during this time that her parents divorced. Hanson's father eventually moved to Nashville from Los Angeles in 1986 after securing a job with country band, Alabama. In January 1987, she began working as a backup musician.

Hanson attended La Habra High School and is listed as one of their Notable Alumni, graduating in 1991. After graduation she attended Fullerton College where she was a Music major and completed a vocational program in Music Business & Recording Engineering. While attending college, Hanson was a professional cheerleader for the Los Angeles Rams for the ’91, ’92 and ’93 seasons. She represented the Rams at the Pro Bowl in 1993, cheering on the All-Star Cheerleading team that year. To pay for school she began competing in the Miss America Scholarship program. She is a former Miss La Habra 1991, Miss Orange County 1992 and Miss Garden Grove 1993. She won the title of Miss California in 1994 and competed at the Miss America Pageant in Atlantic City in September of that year. Ten years later she would return to the Atlantic City stage in 2004 to serve as a celebrity judge where she helped select Deidre Downs, Miss Alabama, as the new Miss America 2005.

== Musical career ==
One of Hanson’s first appearances was a backing vocalist on Rhett Akins' 1996 album Somebody New. In 1998 Hanson was signed to her first publishing deal as a songwriter with Acuff-Rose Music. She was a staff writer for Acuff-Rose from 1998 until 2003 when Sony/ATV Music acquired the Acuff-Rose catalog and the companies merged. Hanson would go on to write for Sony/ATV from 2003 – 2016. In the fall of 2016 she signed with Peermusic where she currently writes.

Hanson began her career as a recording artist in 2002 with the release of her debut single “Beautiful Goodbye”, followed by her self-titled debut album being released on Capitol Records in 2003. She co-produced the album with recording engineer Greg Droman and co-wrote most of the songs on it. The album produced three hit singles on the Billboard Hot Country Songs chart, including the Top 20 hit "Beautiful Goodbye", followed by "This Far Gone" at number 42 and "Half a Heart Tattoo" at number 40. She made her national TV debut on The Tonight Show with Jay Leno on February 28, 2003. In 2007 she switched to Universal South Records, releasing her second studio album Thankful in early 2008, which she co-produced with Nick Brophy. It produced the singles "Joyride" and "'73", the former of which also reached number 42 on the country charts. In 2017 Hanson released a 5-song Christmas EP Under The Tree, her first release in almost 10 years since her 2008 album, Thankful. In July 2020 Hanson released a collaboration EP Here's To Hoping with Folk/Americana artist Michael Logen, co-producing and co-writing all 5 tracks. Rolling Stone listed it among its music picks of the week.

Hanson's songs have earned her multiple BMI, ASCAP, NSAI and NMPA Awards. Her song "Leave The Pieces" helped earn The Wreckers a GRAMMY nomination for Best Vocal Performance by a Duo or Group in 2007. She also wrote "You’re Breaking Your Own Heart" which appeared on Kelly Clarkson's Grammy Award-winning album Stronger which won for Best Pop Vocal Album in 2013. Her work has been featured in numerous television shows, including Grey's Anatomy, Station 19, The Bold Type, The Voice, American Idol, America's Got Talent, America's Funniest Home Videos, Songland, Duets, The Sing-Off, The Kelly Clarkson Show, The Tonight Show, Good Morning America, Selling Sunset, Emily in Paris, Restored by the Fords, Ghosted, The Fosters, Switched at Birth and Beauty and the Beast, as well as in major national and international ad campaigns and promo spots for Xbox, Target, Coors Light and AdventHealth.

She has served on the Board of Governors for The Recording Academy for the Nashville Chapter from 2016 to 2019. In 2019 she was elected President of the Nashville Chapter of the Recording Academy.

As of 2003, Hanson was married to songwriter Mark Nesler. In 2010, with Marty Dodson, the couple co-wrote "Let Me Down Easy" for singer Billy Currington.

She was ranked No. 93 on the FHM 100 Sexiest Women of 2005.

In 2021, Hanson wrote the song "I Will Follow", the second official single by the group Chapel Hart.

== Discography ==
=== Studio albums ===
Title	Album details	Peak chart positions		
Title	Album details	US Country	US	US Heat
Jennifer Hanson	Released: February 18, 2003; Label: Capitol Nashville; Format: CD, digital download	20	125	7
Thankful	Released: June 3, 2008; Label: Universal South; Format: CD, digital download	—	—	—
"—" denotes releases that did not chart

=== Extended plays ===
Title	Album details
Under the Tree	Released: November 3, 2017; Label: Self-released; Format: Digital download

=== Singles ===
Year	Single	Peak chart positions		Album
Year	Single	US Country	US	Album
2002	"Beautiful Goodbye"	16	76	Jennifer Hanson
2003	"This Far Gone"	42	—	Jennifer Hanson
2003	"Half a Heart Tattoo"	40	—	Jennifer Hanson
2007	"Joyride"	42	—	Thankful
2008	"'73"	—	—	Thankful
"—" denotes releases that did not chart

=== Music videos ===
Year	Video	Director
2002	"Beautiful Goodbye"	Trey Fanjoy
2003	"This Far Gone"	Trey Fanjoy
2007	"Joyride"	Trey Fanjoy
2008	"'73"	David McClister

Awards and achievements
Preceded by Lisa Michelle Duncan	Miss California; 1994	Succeeded by Tiffany Stoker
