= Love Is the Evidence =

Studio album by Citizen Way
- Released: April 23, 2013
- Recorded: 2011–13
- Genre: Christian rock
- Length: 35:28
- Label: Fair Trade
- Producer: Citizen Way, Seth Mosley

Citizen Way chronology
The Least of These (2009)	Love Is the Evidence (2013)	2.0 (2016)

Singles from Love Is the Evidence
- 1. "Should've Been Me" Released: June 26, 2012; 2. "Nothing Ever (Could Separate Us)" Released: April 9, 2013

Love Is the Evidence is the first studio album by American Christian rock band Citizen Way, which was released on April 26, 2013, by Fair Trade Services, and the producers on the album were Seth Mosley and Citizen Way.

== Reception ==
=== Critical ===
Professional ratings
Review scores
Source	Rating
CCM Magazine	4/5 stars
Christian Music Zine	3/5 stars
Cross Rhythms	9/10 squares
Indie Vision Music	3/5 stars
Jesus Freak Hideout	3.5/5 stars
Louder Than the Music	5/5 stars
New Release Tuesday	5/5 stars

Love Is the Evidence has received almost universal acclaim from the music critics. Louder Than the Music's Dave Wood found the release to be "modern and relevant sounding, with stunning moments of brilliant inspiration", which "their pop approach to worship is refreshing and entertaining". At New Release Tuesday, Kevin Davis told that after hearing the album he was "stirred with compassion to love people as Jesus loves us." At Cross Rhythms, Tony Cummings touched on that it took nine years for the band to come into the spotlight, and now "their radio-friendly music will surely mean they stay in the spotlight for quite awhile [sic]." At CCM Magazine, Grace S. Aspinwall noted how "listeners will gravitate towards the likeable pop sound that Citizen Way bring to the table", and this makes it a "strong and enjoyable album and promising debut from start to finish." Mark Rice of Jesus Freak Hideout alluded to how the release was "pretty good with greatness easily within its grasp." Christian Music Zine's Emily Kjonaas evoked that she "see[s] a lot of potential for this band of brothers." At Indie Vision Music, Jonathan Andre vowed that "while it does have its mishaps, issues and drama, is far from unfixable with a great amount of potential to improve upon in years to come!"

=== Commercial ===
On the May 11, 2013 charts, the album was the fourth most sold Billboard Top Heatseekers album. Plus, it was the No. 22 most sold Christian Album in the United States.

== Track listing ==
Tracklist
No.	Title	Writer(s)	Length
1.	"Nothing Ever (Could Separate Us)"	Ben Calhoun, Jason Ingram, Seth Mosley	3:43
2.	"Evidence"	Ben Calhoun, Jeff Pardo	2:52
3.	"All Things"	Ben Calhoun	3:28
4.	"Should've Been Me"	Ben Calhoun	2:53
5.	"Lights On"	Ben Calhoun, Jason Ingram, Seth Mosley	3:44
6.	"How Sweet the Sound"	Ben Calhoun, Josh Calhoun	3:41
7.	"Fall Like Rain"	Ben Calhoun	3:57
8.	"Love Is a Mess"	Ben Calhoun, Matt Hammitt, Seth Mosley	3:49
9.	"Where Would I Be Without You"	Ben Calhoun	3:29
10.	"Sing, Sing, Sing"	Ben Calhoun	3:54
11.	"Evidence (Single Version) (Available on bonus track edition)"	Ben Calhoun, Jeff Pardo	2:59
Total length:			38:27

== Personnel ==
Citizen Way

- Ben Calhoun – vocals, programming, guitars, horns
- Josh Calhoun – vocals, upright piano, keyboards, synthesizers, drums (10)
- Ben Blascoe – bass guitar, backing vocals (4)
- David Blascoe – Omnichord, ukulele, drums (1–9), percussion, backing vocals (4)

Additional musicians

- Seth Mosley – synthesizers, programming, guitars, banjo, ukulele, backing vocals
- Jeff Pardo – keyboards (2)
- Jason Ingram – acoustic guitar (1)
- David Henry – strings
- Matt Hammitt – vocals (8)

=== Production ===
- James Rueger – A&R
- Citizen Way – producers
- Seth Mosley – producer, engineer, mix assistant (1, 5, 8)
- Ben Phillips – engineer (4)
- Aaron Ruse – engineer (10)
- F. Reid Shippen – mixing at Robot Lemon (Nashville, Tennessee)
- Paul "Paco" Cossette – mix assistant (2, 4, 6)
- Allen Salmon – mix assistant (3, 7, 9, 10)
- Dave McNair – mastering
- Dana Salsedo – creative director
- Jeremy Spyridon – graphic design
- David Molnar – photography
- Creative Trust – management

== Charts ==
Chart (2013)	Peak position
US Top Christian Albums (Billboard)	22
US Top Heatseekers (Billboard)	4
