= 2.0 (Citizen Way album) =

Studio album by Citizen Way
- Released: March 11, 2016
- Studio: Full Circle Music (Franklin, Tennessee); SeeMore Studios, The Mess Hall and Solid Sound (Nashville, Tennessee)
- Genre: Christian pop; Christian rock; Christian EDM; worship
- Length: 39:08
- Label: Fair Trade
- Producer: Bryan Fowler; Seth Mosley; Michael "X" O'Connor; Jeff Pardo; Jonathan Smith; Christopher Stevens; Colby Wedgeworth

Citizen Way chronology
Love Is the Evidence (2013)	2.0 (2016)

2.0 is the second major label studio album by Citizen Way. Fair Trade Services released the album on March 11, 2016.

== Critical reception ==
Professional ratings
Review scores
Source	Rating
365 Days of Inspiring Media	4/5 stars
CCM Magazine	4/5 stars
The Christian Beat	4.7/5
Jesus Freak Hideout	2.5/5 stars
New Release Today	4/5 stars

Andy Argyrakis, indicating in a four star review at CCM Magazine, writes, "Get ready for an onslaught of anthems as Citizen Way turns in its second long player, which finds the guys even more seasoned than the first time around following three years of tireless touring." Awarding the album four stars from New Release Today, Amanda Brogan-DeWilde states, "Citizen Way takes that journey with you, and entertains you with some catchy tunes on the way." Jonathan Andre, giving the album four stars at 365 Days of Inspiring Media, writes, "Ben and the rest of the band for creating 11 moments of inspiration, encouragement and heartfelt moments of poignancy!" Reviewing the album for Today's Christian Entertainment, Kelly Meade describes, "With their positive, upbeat approach to contemporary Christian music, Citizen Way brings a collection of encouraging anthems while keeping the message of God's love [and] faithfulness center stage." Chris Major, rating the album a 4.7 by The Christian Beat, says, "Undeniably adventurous and energetic, 2.0 takes the originally high bar set by Citizen Way and raises it even further...The verdict is in - Citizen Way 2.0 is an absolute must listen for fans of any genre of Christian music...Most certainly, 2.0 marks a new era for Citizen Way filled with new sounds, impactful lyrics, and exciting possibilities." Signaling in a two and a half star review from Jesus Freak Hideout, Mark Rice says, "Citizen Way has totally lost their identity on 2.0. While moments of clever songwriting and an energetic opening track elevate the album above a total pass, it is hard to understand the band's decision here to abandon an approach that they could have pursued and perfected just to leap into mediocrity by starting all over from scratch."

== Track listing ==
No.	Title	Writer(s)	Length
1.	"Elevated"	Ben Calhoun, Shy Carter, Colby Wedgeworth, Nate Welch	3:08
2.	"Rivals"	B. Calhoun, Jordan Frye, Jeff Sojka, Josh Zegan	3:19
3.	"When I'm With You"	B. Calhoun, Josh Calhoun, Seth Mosley	3:33
4.	"I Will"	B. Calhoun, Jeff Pardo	4:05
5.	"Bigger"	B. Calhoun, Matt Bronleewe, Cindy Morgan, Jonathan Steingard, Wedgeworth	3:04
6.	"Revival"	B. Calhoun, Wedgeworth, Welch	4:04
7.	"Set It on Fire"	B. Calhoun, Bart Millard, Pardo, Wedgeworth	3:23
8.	"On My Side"	B. Calhoun, Pardo	3:19
9.	"Just Hold On"	B. Calhoun, Jeremy Camp, Mosley	4:09
10.	"All My Cares"	B. Calhoun, Jonathan Smith	3:00
11.	"Bulletproof"	B. Calhoun, J. Calhoun, Bryan Fowler, Christopher Stevens	4:04
Total length:			39:08

== Charts ==
Chart (2016)	Peak position
US Christian Albums (Billboard)	9
