= One on One (Randy Owen album) =

Studio album by Randy Owen
- Released: November 4, 2008
- Genre: Country
- Length: 39:35
- Label: Broken Bow
- Producer: John Rich

Professional ratings
Review scores
Source	Rating
Allmusic	3.5/5 stars
Engine 145	3/5 stars

One on One is the debut (and to date only) solo studio album from Alabama lead singer Randy Owen. The album was released on Broken Bow Records on November 4, 2008. The album has produced two charted singles on the Hot Country Songs chart. The first of these, "Braid My Hair", reached number 45 in mid-2008 under the promotion of DMP Records. "Like I Never Broke Her Heart", the second single, debuted in late 2008 and peaked at 41. "Holding Everything", a duet with fiddler Megan Mullins, was the third and final single, although it did not chart. John Rich of Big & Rich produced the album. This would become Randy Owen's only solo studio album to be recorded under his name as he would go on to eventually rejoin and reunite with his bandmates to reform Alabama in 2010. In 2015, the title track "One on One" was reused by Randy Owen as an Alabama band member and he re-recorded a new version of the song for the band's Southern Drawl album.

== Track listing ==
1. "I Confess" (John Rich, Randy Owen, James Otto) – 3:15
2. "Holding Everything" (Dolly Parton) – 3:13
  - duet with Megan Mullins
3. "Like I Never Broke Her Heart" (Mitzi Dawn, J. T. Harding, Shannon Lawson) – 3:24
4. "Braid My Hair" (Christopher Gray, Brent Wilson) – 4:23
5. "One on One" (Owen) – 3:05
6. "Let's Pretend We're Strangers for the Night" (Lawson, Rich, Owen) – 3:38
7. "Slow and Steady" (Dale Morris) – 3:01
8. "Urban's on the Country Radio" (Owen) – 3:48
9. "No One Can Love You Anymore" (Owen, Rich, Vicky McGehee) – 4:33
10. "Barbados" (Owen) – 2:55
11. "Pray Me Back Home Again" (Owen) – 4:20

== Personnel ==
- Randy Owen – lead vocals
- Jeffrey Roach – acoustic piano, Wurlitzer electric piano, Hammond B3 organ, synthesizers
- Mike Rojas – acoustic piano, Hammond B3 organ
- Shawn Pennington – electric guitars
- Adam Shoenfeld – baritone guitar, electric guitars
- Danny Rader – acoustic guitar
- John Willis – acoustic guitar
- Pat McGrath – gut-string guitar
- Mike Johnson – steel guitar
- Gary Morse – steel guitar
- Larry Paxton – bass guitar, string arrangements
- Ethan Pilzer – bass guitar
- Michael Rhodes – bass guitar
- Steve Brewster – drums, percussion
- Jonathan Yudkin – fiddle, mandolin, strings, string arrangements and composer
- Kristin Wilkinson – string arrangements
- Nashville String Machine – strings
- Kim Fleming – backing vocals
- Wes Hightower – backing vocals
- Aaron Mason – backing vocals
- James Otto – backing vocals
- Megan Mullins – lead vocals (2)

== Chart performance ==
Chart performance for One on One
Chart (2008)	Peak position
US Billboard 200	77
US Top Country Albums (Billboard)	14
US Independent Albums (Billboard)	5
