= Hey Girl (Billy Currington song) =

Single by Billy Currington

from the album We Are Tonight
- Released: March 18, 2013
- Recorded: 2013
- Genre: Country
- Length: 3:20
- Label: Mercury Nashville
- Songwriters: Rhett Akins; Chris DeStefano; Ashley Gorley
- Producer: Dann Huff

Billy Currington singles chronology
"Like My Dog" (2011)	"Hey Girl" (2013)	"We Are Tonight" (2013)

"Hey Girl" is a song written by Rhett Akins, Chris DeStefano, and Ashley Gorley and recorded by American country music artist Billy Currington. It was released in March 2013 as the first single from Currington's 2013 album We Are Tonight. The song became Currington's seventh number one hit on the U.S. Billboard Country Airplay chart. It also peaked at numbers 5 and 39 on the Hot Country Songs and Billboard Hot 100 charts, respectively.

== Content ==
This song has the male narrator making advances on a female, saying that "the only line [he] can think to say is 'Hey, girl.'" The song has a moderate tempo and is set in cut time. It uses the E♭ dorian scale (i.e., an E♭ minor scale with the sixth tone raised by a semitone) with a main chord pattern of E♭m–G♭–D♭–A♭.

== Reception ==
=== Critical reception ===
Billy Dukes of Taste of Country gave the song a rating of three-and-a-half stars out of five, writing that "[the] layers of electric guitar and a lengthy (by country radio standards) solo before the bridge add unnecessary distractions, but ultimately Currington’s satisfying delivery brings back a delectable groove." Matt Bjorke of Roughstock also gave the song three-and-a-half stars out of five. He said that "while completely reminding me of those great hook-filled mid/late 1980s adult pop songs melodically, 'Hey Girl' still features a strong vocal and fiddle and steel guitars that are audible more than one might expect." Ben Foster of Country Universe gave the song a C grade, writing that it "has some infectious guitar work going for it, but it’s not enough to elevate the song beyond what it is – regular dime-a-dozen radio filler with a total lack of a lyrical hook."

=== Commercial ===
"Hey Girl" debuted at number 57 on the U.S. Billboard Country Airplay chart for the week of March 23, 2013. It also debuted at number 47 on the U.S. Billboard Hot Country Songs chart for the week of May 11, 2013. It even debuted at number 75 on the Billboard Hot 100 for the week of May 18, 2013, and it debuted at number 87 on the Canadian Hot 100 chart for the week of October 5, 2013. On the Country Airplay chart dated October 19, 2013, "Hey Girl" became Currington's seventh number one country hit.

The song was certified Gold by the RIAA on September 11, 2013, became Currington's sixth single to be certified as so. As of February 2014, the single has sold 836,000 copies in the United States.

== Music video ==
The accompanying music video for this song was directed by Kristin Barlowe and premiered in July 2013. The video follows Billy being attracted to a woman and follows her to a carnival to get her to be with him. It ends with the woman waiting on his motorcycle for him to get out the place there in. Intercut are scenes of Billy and his band playing in an empty parking lot.

== Charts and certifications ==
=== Weekly charts ===
Chart (2013)	Peak position
Canada Hot 100 (Billboard)	58
Canada Country (Billboard)	18
US Billboard Hot 100	39
US Country Airplay (Billboard)	1
US Hot Country Songs (Billboard)	5

=== Year-end charts ===
Chart (2013)	Position
US Country Airplay (Billboard)	1
US Hot Country Songs (Billboard)	19

=== Certifications ===
Region	Certification	Certified units/sales
Canada (Music Canada)	Gold	40,000^{*}
United States (RIAA)	Platinum	836,000
^{*} Sales figures based on certification alone.
