= Pretty Good at Drinkin' Beer =

Single by Billy Currington

from the album Enjoy Yourself
- Released: May 24, 2010
- Recorded: 2010
- Genre: Country
- Length: 3:00
- Label: Mercury Nashville
- Songwriter: Troy Jones
- Producers: Billy Currington; Carson Chamberlain

Billy Currington singles chronology
"That's How Country Boys Roll" (2009)	"Pretty Good at Drinkin' Beer" (2010)	"Let Me Down Easy" (2010)

"Pretty Good at Drinkin' Beer" is a song written by Troy Jones and recorded by American country music artist Billy Currington. It was released in May 2010 as the first single from Currington's 2010 album Enjoy Yourself (2010). The song became Currington's fifth number one hit on the U.S. Billboard Hot Country Songs chart. It also peaked outside the Top 40 of the Billboard Hot 100 chart at number 41. It even peaked within the Top 50 on the Canadian Hot 100 chart in Canada. In addition, it was certified Platinum by the Recording Industry Association of America (RIAA), denoting sales of over 1,000,000 copies in the United States. The song received mixed reviews from critics. The accompanying music video was directed by Potsy Ponciroli.

== Content ==
The song is an up-tempo tune in which the narrator claims that he's not good at most of the normal things that men are known for (e.g. digging holes, paving roads, climbing high line poles, working in banks, painting, fixing cars, mowing grass, working hard, and cleaning windows) but is rather "pretty good at drinking beer".

== Critical reception ==
The song has been given some mixed reviews from critics who were divided over its lyrics. Bobby Peacock of Roughstock gave the song four out of five stars, and said that the song is "another pleasing, low-key charmer in a rapidly growing repertoire." Kevin John Coyne of Country Universe gave the song a B+ and a positive review, stating that compared to other drinking songs, "this one matches the pace of the kind of drinking he’s talking about." Karlie Justus of Engine 145 gave the song a thumbs-down, saying that it "plods in circles without any sort of reward for listeners" and that its lyrics were "neither memorable or catchy," but also said that its "honesty and simplicity boosts its authenticity."

== Music video ==
The music video was directed by Potsy Ponciroli and premiered in July 2010. It shows a middle-aged overweight man going to a pool party, presumed to be for his girlfriend, named Cindy in the video. It starts with a short prologue, showing the guy getting ready for the party, by putting on clothes, stretching, and circling his calendar. He then walks outside and sees a cute girl across the street having her car fixed by her presumed boyfriend. The boyfriend rolls out from under the car and sees the pair making kissy-faces across the yard at each other, he then walks over, knocks the main character to the ground, and drives off with the girlfriend. It then cuts to the party, where he and his buddy have shown up for the party, are enjoying themselves and then see the previous antagonist. Currington is seen performing with a guitar at poolside throughout the video. He challenges the antagonist to a game of beer-pong and proceeds to demolish him and win the cute girl back in the process. The video ends with him (the main character) winning a game of beer-pong, and then walking off with the girl while the antagonist gives him the finger. It was filmed at a house in Nashville over an 8-hour period. The main character is played by the video's producer, who volunteered to be in it.

== Chart performance ==
"Pretty Good at Drinkin' Beer" debuted at number 48 on the U.S. Billboard Hot Country Songs charts for the week ending June 5, 2010. It also debuted on the Billboard Hot 100 at number 83 for the week ending June 19, 2010. It also debuted at number 94 on the Canadian Hot 100 chart for the week of July 17, 2010. In September, it became Currington's fifth number one hit on the country charts, spending one week at that position.

Chart (2010)	Peak position
US Hot Country Songs (Billboard)	1
US Billboard Hot 100	41
Canada Country (Billboard)	1
Canada Hot 100 (Billboard)	50

=== Year-end charts ===
Chart (2010)	Position
US Country Songs (Billboard)	28

== Certifications ==
Region	Certification	Certified units/sales
United States (RIAA)	Platinum	1,000,000^{‡}
^{‡} Sales+streaming figures based on certification alone.
