= We Are Tonight =

Studio album by Billy Currington
- Released: September 17, 2013
- Recorded: 2013
- Genre: Country
- Label: Mercury Nashville
- Producer: Carson Chamberlain (tracks 3,4,6–9); Shy Carter (track 10); Dann Huff (tracks 1,2,5)

Billy Currington chronology
Icon (2011)	We Are Tonight (2013)	Summer Forever (2015)

Singles from We Are Tonight
- 1. "Hey Girl" Released: March 18, 2013; 2. "We Are Tonight" Released: November 18, 2013

We Are Tonight is the fifth studio album by American country music singer Billy Currington. It was released on September 17, 2013 via Mercury Nashville. The album includes the singles "Hey Girl" and "We Are Tonight".

== Content ==
Currington told Country Weekly that he wanted the album to be "completely happy". Unlike his previous four albums, Currington did not write any of the songs on We Are Tonight.

Among the tracks are a cover of Jack Johnson's "Banana Pancakes", from his album In Between Dreams, and a duet with Willie Nelson on "Hard to Be a Hippie". According to Currington, the song ended up as a duet with Nelson because Currington had told co-writer Scotty Emerick, a mutual friend of the two, that he wanted to record the song; when Emerick said that Nelson wanted to record it, Currington then suggested that they do it as a duet.

== Critical reception ==
Professional ratings
Review scores
Source	Rating
Allmusic	4/5 stars
Country Weekly	A−
Got Country Online	4/5 stars
Music Is My Oxygen	4/5 stars
The Plain Dealer	C
Roughstock	4.5/5 stars

We Are Tonight has generally received positive reviews from music critics. Stephen Thomas Erlewine of Allmusic told that "none of [Currington’s] moves feel self-conscious", and that album was "guaranteed to create some nice mellow vibes." Jon Freeman of Country Weekly said that "Billy is a skilled interpreter of songs with a knack for finding the soul in every selection." He generally praised the song selection, but criticized the title track for "fall[ing] back on the small-town truck-riding clichés so prevalent at the moment." Matt Bjorke of Roughstock felt that "We Are Tonight mixes traditional country elements with soul elements and contemporary elements and turns it into a sound that is uniquely and unquestionably Billy Currington." Tara Toro at Got Country Online wrote that the album "will hook ya." Rob Burkhardt of Music Is My Oxygen affirmed that "We Are Tonight is a focused and well-produced record that plays to Billy Currington’s strengths and puts him in the running to be an A-list performer", and that "Time alone will tell whether enough fans will catch on to Currington’s unique style, but this is definitely a record worthy of the attention." Chuck Yarborough of The Plain Dealer stated that the album was "so disappointing. It’s not that it’s all that up-tempo – although most of it is – it’s just that none of it FEELS like it’s coming from a country guy pretending to be a pop guy pretending to be a country guy."

== Track listing ==
No.	Title	Writer(s)	Length
1.	"Hey Girl"	Rhett Akins; Ashley Gorley; Chris DeStefano	3:22
2.	"Wingman"	Jeff Silbar; Chris Gelbuda	4:00
3.	"One Way Ticket"	Gregory Becker; Troy Jones	2:55
4.	"23 Degrees and South"	Tom Douglas; Hillary Lindsey; Gordie Sampson	4:00
5.	"We Are Tonight"	Marc Beeson; Sam Hunt; Josh Osborne	3:52
6.	"Hard to Be a Hippie" (duet with Willie Nelson)	Deanna Bryant; Scotty Emerick; John Scott Sherrill	3:40
7.	"Closer Tonight"	J. T. Harding; Marv Green; Shane McAnally	4:59
8.	"Another Day Without You"	McAnally; Barry Dean; Andrew Dorff	4:08
9.	"Banana Pancakes"	Jack Johnson	4:37
10.	"Hallelujah"	Shy Carter; Brad Warren; Brett Warren	3:03

== Personnel ==
Adapted from liner notes

=== Tracks 3, 4, 6–9 ===
- Shy Carter – background vocals & rap on "Banana Pancakes"
- J.T. Corenflos – electric guitar
- Billy Currington – lead vocals
- Paul Franklin – steel guitar
- Wes Hightower – background vocals
- Paul Leim – drums
- Brent Mason – electric guitar
- Gary Prim – Hammond B-3 organ, keyboards, piano
- Karyn Rochelle – background vocals
- Chris Rodriguez – background vocals
- W. David Smith – bass guitar
- Biff Watson – acoustic guitar

=== Tracks 1, 2, 5 ===
- Tom Bukovac – electric guitar
- Billy Currington – lead vocals
- Paul Franklin – steel guitar
- Steve Herrman – trumpet
- John Hinchey – trombone
- Jim Hoke – baritone saxophone, tenor saxophone
- Dann Huff – electric guitar
- Charlie Judge – Hammond B-3 organ, keyboards
- Chris McHugh – drums
- Jimmie Lee Sloas – bass guitar
- Russell Terrell – background vocals
- Ilya Toshinsky – acoustic guitar
- Jonathan Yudkin – fiddle

=== Track 10 ===
- Joe Ayoub – bass guitar, acoustic guitar, electric guitar, snaps
- Shy Carter – beat box, bells, harmonium, mandolin, percussion, background vocals
- Billy Currington – lead vocals
- L.J. Holifield – drums
- Ahmed Oliver – tenor guitar, organ, MPC, sugar shaker, percussion
- Andy Rose – clavinet, Fender Rhodes, piano, synthesizer
- Marcus Thomas – background vocals
- Brad Warren – acoustic guitar
- Brett Warren – acoustic guitar

== Chart performance ==
The album debuted on the US Billboard 200 at number 10, and at number five on the Top Country Albums chart, selling 26,000 copies in its first week in the US. It sold 41,000 copies in three weeks.

=== Weekly charts ===
Chart (2013)	Peak position
US Billboard 200	10
US Top Country Albums (Billboard)	5

=== Year-end charts ===
Chart (2013)	Position
US Top Country Albums (Billboard)	68

=== Singles ===
Year	Single	Peak chart positions				
Year	Single	US Country	US Country Airplay	US	CAN Country	CAN
2013	"Hey Girl"	5	1	39	18	58
2013	"We Are Tonight"	12	1	60	17	87
