= Like My Dog =

Single by Billy Currington

from the album Enjoy Yourself
- Released: October 10, 2011
- Recorded: 2010
- Genre: Country
- Length: 2:46
- Label: Mercury Nashville
- Songwriters: Harley Allen; Scotty Emerick
- Producers: Carson Chamberlain; Billy Currington

Billy Currington singles chronology
"Love Done Gone" (2011)	"Like My Dog" (2011)	"Hey Girl" (2013)

"Like My Dog" is a song written by Harley Allen and Scotty Emerick and recorded by American country music artist Billy Currington. It was released in October 2011 as the fourth and final single from Currington's 2010 album Enjoy Yourself. The song peaked at number 24 on the U.S. Billboard Hot Country Songs chart.

Jimmy Buffett recorded a cover of the song for his 2023 album Equal Strain on All Parts.

== Critical reception ==
Billy Dukes of Taste of Country gave the song a four-and-a-half-out-of-five star rating, describing it as "cute and a little superficial, but impossible to ignore or not fall in love with." Matt Bjorke of Roughstock gave the song four stars out of five, writing that it's "a clever and undeniably country tune with a laid-back melody that suits Billy's strong country voice."

== Chart performance ==
"Like My Dog" debuted at number 53 on the U.S. Billboard Hot Country Songs chart for the week of October 22, 2011.

Chart (2011–2012)	Peak position
Canada Country (Billboard)	33
US Hot Country Songs (Billboard)	24
US Billboard Bubbling Under Hot 100	2

=== Year-end charts ===
Chart (2012)	Position
US Hot Country Songs (Billboard)	98
