= Citizen Way =

American contemporary Christian music group

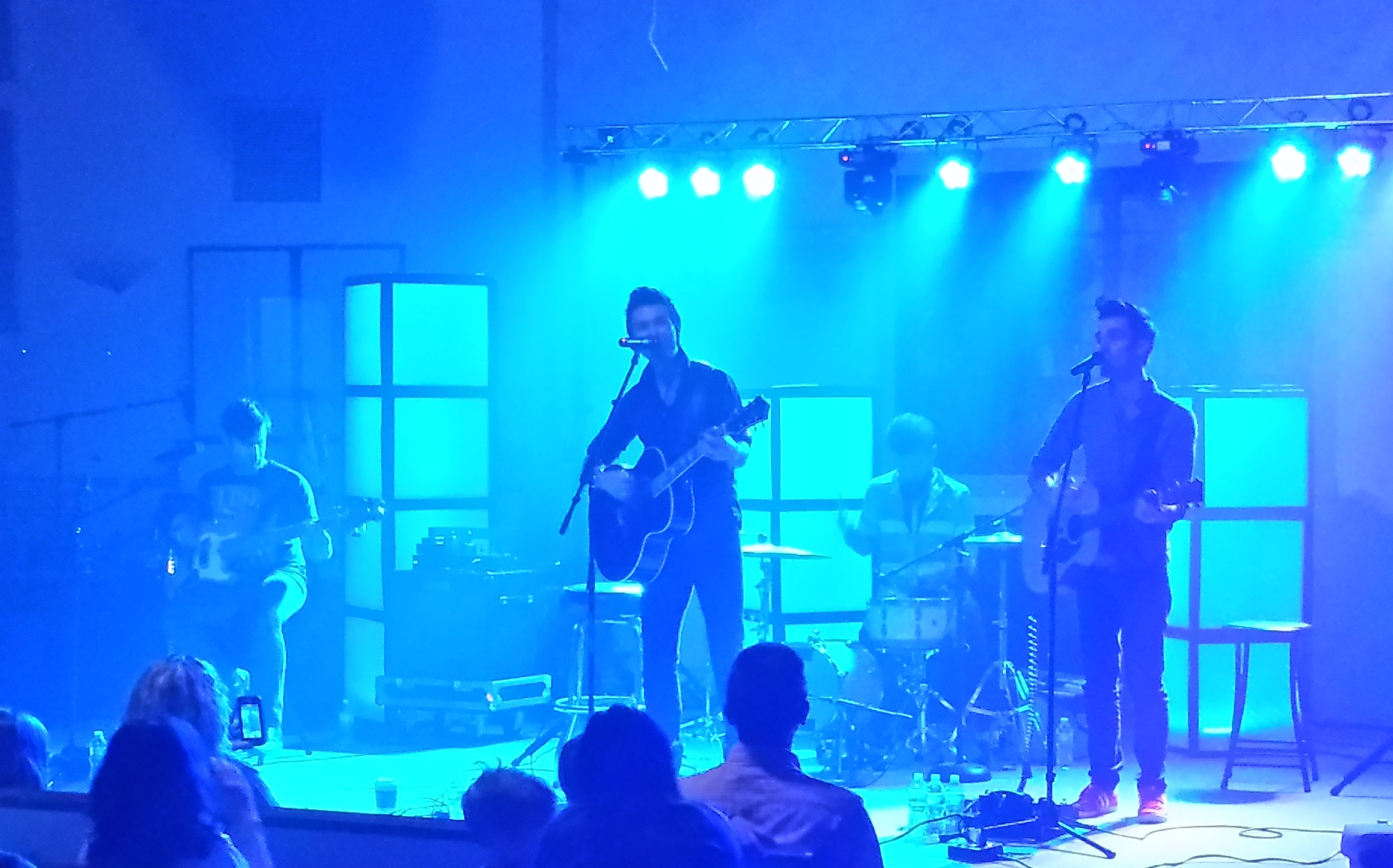

Background information
- Also known as: The Least of These
- Origin: Elgin, Illinois, U.S.
- Genres: Indie rock, Christian rock, Christian alternative rock, Contemporary Christian music, worship
- Years active: 2004–present
- Label: Independent
- Members: Ben Calhoun
- Past members: David Blascoe: Ben Blascoe; Josh Calhoun; Daniel Olsson

Citizen Way is an American contemporary Christian music and Christian worship band from Elgin, Illinois.

== Background ==
The band originally formed in 2004 when Ben Calhoun and Ben Blascoe met one another at Judson University. "As a freshman, Ben Blascoe was playing his bass in the dorm one day when the Ben Calhoun poked his head in. There was a connection and so when Ben Calhoun was ready to record some songs he had composed, he asked the other Ben to join him in the studio. He also recruited his brother Josh, on drums then, who had been playing with Augustana (band) while in college. After the project was completed, the trio continued to play together." The band originally went by "The Least of These". In 2004, they released their self titled debut album. On August 11, 2009, They released their second album, also self titled. The album was produced by Joel Hanson, member of Christian rock band PFR (band). The tenth track on the album titled "No Matter What" was inspired by PFR's song "Fight" on the album "Them" released in 1996. Sometime in 2010 David Blascoe joined the band as the new Drummer. This resulted Josh Calhoun switching to the keys. In 2012, the band decided to change their name to "Citizen Way". At that point, other bands going by the name "The Least of These" were increasing, so the group decided to change their name to avoid confusion. The group was signed by the label Fair Trade Services. The band released their debut single under their newly formed band name titled, "Should've Been Me", on the Fair Trade Services label on June 26, 2012. Their second single, "Nothing Ever (Could Separate Us)", was released in June 2013. Their third single, "How Sweet the Sound", was released on September 27, 2013, and has gone on to become their first No. 1 single. It has charted on Christian AC Indicator and Soft AC/Inspirational, reaching No. 1 on the Christian Soft AC/Inspirational chart on April 3, 2014. The single spent four weeks atop the Christian Soft AC/Inspirational chart.

In 2015, Bass guitarist Ben Blascoe announced his departure from the band as Ben Calhoun and his family moved from their home base at Judson to Nashville, Tennessee so that Ben Calhoun could focus and invest in the group’s new record. In 2016, Josh Calhoun left the band and eventually started working on a solo music career. That same year, Daniel Olsson joined the band on guitar. In December 2019, David Blascoe announced on his social media that he was departing from the band. Olsson left the band around the time of David Blascoe's departure, leaving Ben Calhoun to continue the band name all on his own.

== Discography ==
=== Albums ===
Year	Album	Peak chart positions		
Year	Album	US	US Christ.	US Heat.
2013	Love Is the Evidence: Release date: April 23, 2013; Label: Fair Trade Services; Formats: CD, digital download	—	22	4
2016	2.0: Release date: March 11, 2016; Label: Fair Trade; Formats: CD, Digital download	— (Note: 2.0 did not chart on the Billboard 200, but peaked at No. 94 on the Billboard Top Album Sales chart.)	9	—
2019	Love Is a Lion: Release date: October 18, 2019; Label: Fair Trade; Formats: CD, digital download	—	— (Note: Love Is a Lion did not chart on the Billboard Top Christian Albums chart, but peaked at No. 30 on the Billboard Christian Album Sales chart.)	—

=== Singles ===
Year	Title	Peak chart positions					Album
Year	Title	US Christ	US Christian Airplay	US Christ Digital	US Christ AC	Christian AC Ind.	Album
2012	"Should've Been Me"	14		—	10	4	Love Is the Evidence
2013	"Nothing Ever (Could Separate Us)"	13		—	16	7	Love Is the Evidence
2014	"How Sweet the Sound"	11	5	10	2	3	Love Is the Evidence
2014	"Evidence"	23	20	—	16	17	Love Is the Evidence
2016	"When I'm with You"	22	12	17	10	16	2.0
2017	"I Will"	46	39	—	—	23	2.0
2017	"Bulletproof"	9	7	4	4	1	2.0
2018	"WaveWalker" (featuring Bart Millard of MercyMe)	35	38	—	25	17	Love Is a Lion
2019	"The Lord's Prayer"	—	41	—	—	22	Love Is a Lion
2021	"Love Has Won"	—	46	—	—	—	Love Is a Lion

=== Promotional singles ===
Year	Title	Peak chart positions	Album
Year	Title	US Christ	Album
2019	"Love Has Won"	—	Love Is a Lion
