= That's How Country Boys Roll =

2009 single by Billy Currington

Single by Billy Currington

from the album Little Bit of Everything
- Released: September 14, 2009
- Genre: Country, country rock
- Length: 3:44
- Label: Mercury Nashville
- Songwriters: Billy Currington; Dallas Davidson; Brett Jones
- Producers: Carson Chamberlain; Billy Currington

Billy Currington singles chronology
"People Are Crazy" (2009)	"That's How Country Boys Roll" (2009)	"Pretty Good at Drinkin' Beer" (2010)

"That's How Country Boys Roll" is a song co-written and recorded by American country music artist Billy Currington. It was released in September 2009 as the third single from his 2008 album Little Bit of Everything. The song became Currington's fourth number one hit on the U.S. Billboard Hot Country Songs chart for the week of October 10, 2009. Currington wrote this song with Dallas Davidson and Brett Jones.

== Content ==
The song is an up-tempo tune, in which the narrator lists off various traits of a "country boy," such as his work ethic and leisure activities.

== Music video ==
The accompanying music video for this song was directed by Potsy Ponciroli and premiered during CMT's Big New Music Weekend on October 2, 2009, and on GAC a month later. In the video, which was shot both in black-and-white and in color, Currington is performing in concert (black-and-white) in Louisville, Kentucky, and he is boating, fishing, and riding around with his band (color). The last scene is someone snoring on a plane that is then seen flying away. All the acting was filmed in Key West, FL, while the concert (which brought in about 10,000 fans) was filmed in Louisville, KY during Billy's 2009 tour.

The video entered at #19 on CMT's Top Twenty Countdown on December 4, 2009, about two months after its release.

== Critical reception ==
Bobby Peacock of Roughstock criticized the song for its theme, but added that Currington "gives a typically rock-solid vocal performance." Tara Seetharam of Country Universe gave the song a C+ and a less positive review, stating that she'd "much rather have Currington tell me how country boys roll than have Jason Aldean preach to me how country girls roll… but then again, I’d much rather hear Alan Jackson’s genuine story of a small town southern man than listen to either." Stephen Thomas Erlewine of Allmusic, in his review of the album, referred to the song as a "straight-up redneck anthem" and a "perfectly fine tune."

== Chart performance ==
"That's How Country Boys Roll" debuted at No. 54 on the U.S. Billboard Hot Country Songs chart for the week of September 26, 2009. It also debuted on the Billboard Hot 100 at No. 100 on the week ending December 12, 2009, and re-entered that chart at No. 96 on the week ending January 16, 2010. On the chart week of March 20, 2010, it became his fourth Number One hit on the country charts in the United States.

Chart (2009–2010)	Peak position
US Hot Country Songs (Billboard)	1
US Billboard Hot 100	57
Canada Country (Billboard)	1
Canada Hot 100 (Billboard)	67

=== Year-end charts ===
Chart (2010)	Position
US Country Songs (Billboard)	26
