= Summer Forever =

Studio album by Billy Currington
- Released: June 2, 2015
- Recorded: 2014–2015
- Genre: Country
- Length: 41:07
- Label: Mercury Nashville
- Producers: Dann Huff (all tracks); Jesse Frasure (track 12)

Billy Currington chronology
We Are Tonight (2013)	Summer Forever (2015)	Intuition (2021)

Singles from Summer Forever
- 1. "Don't It" Released: October 27, 2014; 2. "Drinkin' Town with a Football Problem" Released: June 8, 2015; 3. "It Don't Hurt Like It Used To" Released: February 8, 2016; 4. "Do I Make You Wanna" Released: November 21, 2016; 5. "Wake Me Up" Released: September 11, 2017

Summer Forever is the sixth studio album by American country music singer Billy Currington. It was released on June 2, 2015 via Mercury Nashville. The album includes the number one singles "Don't It", "It Don't Hurt Like It Used To", and "Do I Make You Wanna". This is Currington's fifth consecutive album to contain at least two number one singles and his first album to have three singles at the top of the charts.

== Content ==
In an interview with website Taste of Country, Currington stated: "Making this album was such a blast for me. I put a lot of love into this project and couldn’t be more excited for fans to hear the new music". He also added that "Summer Forever for [him] represents a positive, happy, good time lifestyle and that’s what [he] hope[s] the fans feel when they hear the record". "Don't It" was released on October 27, 2014 as the album's lead off single. It peaked at number one on the Country Airplay chart dated June 6, 2015. The album's second single, "Drinkin' Town with a Football Problem", was released to radio on June 8, 2015. Despite a relatively high debut at number 41, the song fell to number 54 in its second week and struggled to climb the charts, ultimately peaking at number 30 in November 2015 and becoming Currington's lowest-charting single at the time, alongside "Tangled Up" from 2007. "It Don't Hurt Like It Used To" was sent to country radio on February 8, 2016 as the album's third single. It reached number one on the Country Airplay chart in October 2016 and held the number one position for two consecutive weeks. "Do I Make You Wanna" is the album's fourth single, being served to radio in November 2016. It reached number one on the Country Airplay chart in August 2017, holding that position for three consecutive weeks. "Wake Me Up" served as the album's fifth and final single, releasing to country radio in September 2017.

== Track listing ==
No.	Title	Writer(s)	Length
1.	"Don't It"	Jaren Johnston; Ashley Gorley; Ross Copperman	3:09
2.	"Drinkin' Town with a Football Problem"	Elizabeth Elkins; Aaron Henningsen; Brian Henningsen; Clara Henningsen; Vanessa Olivarez	4:14
3.	"Wake Me Up"	Josh Osborne; Jimmy Robbins; Gorley	3:38
4.	"Good Night" (featuring Jessie James)	Daniel Tashian; Claire Guerreso; Rosi Golan	4:09
5.	"Jonesin'"	Shane McAnally; Robbins; Hillary Lindsey	3:33
6.	"Give It to Me Straight"	Abe Stoklasa; Mark Trussell	3:22
7.	"It Don't Hurt Like It Used To"	Billy Currington; Cary Barlowe; Shy Carter	3:05
8.	"Nowhere Town"	Aimee Mayo; Chris Lindsey; Osborne	3:44
9.	"Do I Make You Wanna"	Gorley; Zach Crowell; Matt Jenkins; Jerry Flowers	3:56
10.	"Sweet Love"	Donovan Woods; Madeleine Slate; Dan Swinimer	3:23
11.	"Soundtrack"	Bobby Huff; Ben Burgess	3:30
12.	"Summer Forever"	Cole Swindell; Johnston; Brian Kelley; Tyler Hubbard; Jesse Frasure	3:24

== Personnel ==
Adapted from liner notes

- J. Bonilla – programming on "Jonesin'"
- Mike Brignardello – bass guitar
- Tom Bukovac – electric guitar
- Jessie James Decker – background vocals on "Good Night"
- Paul Franklin – steel guitar
- Jesse Frasure – programming on "It Don't Hurt Like It Used To" & "Summer Forever"
- Kenny Greenberg – electric guitar
- Dann Huff – electric guitar
- David Huff – programming
- Charlie Judge – keyboards
- Chris McHugh – drums
- Danny Rader – acoustic guitar
- Jimmie Lee Sloas – bass guitar
- Russell Terrell – background vocals
- Ilya Toshinsky – acoustic guitar
- Derek Wells – electric guitar

== Chart performance ==
The album debuted on the Top Country Albums chart at number 3, and on the Billboard 200 at number 15, selling over 20,800 copies in the United States during its first week. The album has sold 68,500 copies in the US as of October 2016.

=== Weekly charts ===
Chart (2015)	Peak position
Canadian Albums (Billboard)	24
US Billboard 200	15
US Top Country Albums (Billboard)	3

=== Year-end charts ===
Chart (2015)	Position
US Top Country Albums (Billboard)	54
Chart (2017)	Position
US Top Country Albums (Billboard)	94

=== Singles ===
Year	Single	Peak chart positions				
Year	Single	US Country	US Country Airplay	US	CAN Country	CAN
2014	"Don't It"	4	1	44	1	46
2015	"Drinkin' Town with a Football Problem"	41	30	—	—	—
2016	"It Don't Hurt Like It Used To"	3	1	44	1	77
2016	"Do I Make You Wanna"	5	1	47	3	—
2017	"Wake Me Up"	—	45	—	—	—

== Certifications ==
Certifications for Summer Forever
Region	Certification	Certified units/sales
United States (RIAA)	Gold	500,000^{‡}
^{‡} Sales+streaming figures based on certification alone.
