= We Are Tonight (song) =

Single by Billy Currington

from the album We Are Tonight
- Released: November 18, 2013
- Recorded: 2013
- Genre: Country
- Length: 3:52
- Label: Mercury Nashville
- Songwriter(s): Marc Beeson; Sam Hunt; Josh Osborne
- Producer(s): Dann Huff

Billy Currington singles chronology
"Hey Girl" (2013)	"We Are Tonight" (2013)	"Don't It" (2014)

Music video
- "We Are Tonight" on YouTube

"We Are Tonight" is a song written by Marc Beeson, Sam Hunt, and Josh Osborne and recorded by American country music singer Billy Currington. It was released in November 2013 as the second single from Currington's 2013 album We Are Tonight.

The song became Currington's eighth number one hit on the U.S. Billboard Country Airplay chart. It also charted at numbers 12 and 60 on both the Hot Country Songs and Billboard Hot 100 charts respectively. The song was certified gold by the Recording Industry Association of America (RIAA), and it has sold 455,000 copies in the United States as of August 2014. It achieved similar chart success in Canada, peaking at number 17 on the Canada Country chart and number 87 on the Canadian Hot 100 chart.

The accompanying music video for the song was directed by Kristin Barlowe. One of the song's writers, Sam Hunt, recorded an acoustic version of the track for his 2013 mixtape Between the Pines.

== Critical reception ==
The song received a favorable review from Taste of Country, which said that Currington's "emphatic, soulful style allows the title track from his new album to become a refreshing, anthemic party song that will still sound good sober". It also stated that "sharp, descriptive lyrics add color to each verse before a powerful chorus becomes the song's signature moment".

== Music video ==
The music video was directed by Kristin Barlowe and premiered in September 2013. It was filmed at the DeKalb County Fairgrounds in Alexandria, Tennessee.

== Chart performance ==
"We Are Tonight" debuted at number 53 on the U.S. Billboard Country Airplay chart for the week of December 7, 2013. It also debuted at number 49 on the U.S. Billboard Hot Country Songs chart for the week of January 18, 2014. The song has sold 455,000 copies in the U.S. as of August 2014.

The song debuted at number 97 on the Canadian Hot 100 chart for the week of July 5, 2014.

Chart (2013–2014)	Peak position
Canada (Canadian Hot 100)	87
Canada Country (Billboard)	17
US Billboard Hot 100	60
US Country Airplay (Billboard)	1
US Hot Country Songs (Billboard)	12

=== Year-end charts ===
Chart (2014)	Position
US Country Airplay (Billboard)	4
US Hot Country Songs (Billboard)	37

== Certifications ==
Region	Certification	Certified units/sales
United States (RIAA)	Platinum	455,000
