= Jennifer Hanson (album) =

Studio album by Jennifer Hanson
- Released: February 18, 2003
- Genre: Country
- Length: 43:34
- Label: Capitol Nashville
- Producer: Jennifer Hanson; Greg Droman

Jennifer Hanson chronology
Jennifer Hanson (2003)	Thankful (2008)

Singles from Jennifer Hanson
- 1. "Beautiful Goodbye" Released: July 29, 2002; 2. "This Far Gone" Released: March 24, 2003; 3. "Half a Heart Tattoo" Released: July 21, 2003

Professional ratings
Review scores
Source	Rating
Allmusic	link
Country Standard Time	link
Country Weekly	link

Jennifer Hanson is the debut studio album by American country music artist Jennifer Hanson. Released in 2003 on Capitol Records Nashville, it produced three singles for Hanson on the Billboard Hot Country Songs charts: "Beautiful Goodbye" at #16, " This Far Gone" at #42, and "Half a Heart Tattoo" at #40. The album itself reached #20 on the Top Country Albums charts.

"It Isn't Just Raining" was originally recorded by Pam Tillis on her 2001 album Thunder and Roses.

== Track listing ==
Jennifer Hanson track listing
No.	Title	Writer(s)	Length
1.	"Beautiful Goodbye"	Jennifer Hanson; Kim Patton-Johnston	4:19
2.	"Just One of Those Days"	Hanson; Patton-Johnston	3:40
3.	"Half a Heart Tattoo"	Hanson; Michael P. Heeney; A. J. Masters	3:58
4.	"This Far Gone"	Mark Nesler; Tony Martin	3:41
5.	"Get Yourself Back"	Hanson; Nesler; Martin	3:57
6.	"All Those Yesterdays"	Hanson; Heeney; Masters	4:30
7.	"Travis"	Hanson; Patton-Johnston	4:05
8.	"One Little Word"	Hanson; Billy Austin; Greg Barnhill	3:51
9.	"It Isn't Just Raining"	Hanson; Nesler; Martin	3:50
10.	"Baby I Was Wrong"	Nesler; Martin	4:07
11.	"Simply Yours"	Hanson; Nesler; Martin	3:45
Total length:			43:34

== Credits ==
- Gary Burnette – acoustic guitar, electric guitar, gut string guitar
- J. T. Corenflos – electric guitar
- Eric Darken – percussion
- Dan Dugmore – acoustic guitar, electric guitar, slide guitar, steel guitar, lap steel guitar
- Thomas Flora – background vocals
- Shannon Forrest – drums, tambourine
- Kenny Greenberg – acoustic guitar, electric guitar
- Jennifer Hanson – lead vocals, background vocals
- Kirk "Jelly Roll" Johnson – harmonica
- Troy Lancaster – electric guitar, slide guitar
- Nashville String Machine – string section
- Mark Nesler – acoustic guitar, background vocals
- Michael Rhodes – bass guitar
- Mike Rojas – piano, keyboards, clavinet, synthesizer, Hammond organ, Mellotron, Wurlitzer

== Charts ==
Chart (2003)	Peak position
US Top Country Albums (Billboard)	20
US Billboard 200	125
US Heatseekers Albums (Billboard)	7
