= Do I Make You Wanna =

Single by Billy Currington

from the album Summer Forever
- Released: November 21, 2016
- Genre: Country
- Length: 3:56
- Label: Mercury Nashville
- Songwriters: Ashley Gorley; Zach Crowell; Matt Jenkins; Jerry Flowers
- Producer: Dann Huff

Billy Currington singles chronology
"It Don't Hurt Like It Used To" (2016)	"Do I Make You Wanna" (2016)	"Wake Me Up" (2017)

"Do I Make You Wanna" is a song written by Ashley Gorley, Zach Crowell, Matt Jenkins and Jerry Flowers and recorded by American country music artist Billy Currington. It was released in November 2016 as the fourth single from Currington's 2015 album Summer Forever. To date, the song is his most recent number one single.

== Critical reception ==
Kevin John Coyne of Country Universe gave the song a mixed-to-negative review, giving it a C− grade and describing it as "a weak attempt at being amorous, hobbled by childish ideas of what seduction should look like (“truth or dare”) and suggestions for the evening that are all over the place, ranging from Vegas flights to truck stop scratch-off tickets." He concluded his review by calling the song "simply beneath [Currington's] talent."

== Commercial performance ==
"Do I Make You Wanna" reached No. 1 on the Country Airplay chart on August 12, 2017, and stayed at that position for three consecutive weeks. As of September 2017, the song has sold 190,000 copies in the US.

== Charts ==
=== Weekly charts ===
Chart (2016–2017)	Peak position
Canada Country (Billboard)	3
US Billboard Hot 100	47
US Country Airplay (Billboard)	1
US Hot Country Songs (Billboard)	5

=== Year-end charts ===
Chart (2017)	Position
Canada Country (Billboard)	21
US Country Airplay (Billboard)	9
US Hot Country Songs (Billboard)	41
US Radio Songs (Billboard)	57

== Certifications ==
Region	Certification	Certified units/sales
United States (RIAA)	Platinum	1,000,000^{‡}
^{‡} Sales+streaming figures based on certification alone.
