= Walk a Little Straighter =

Single by Billy Currington

from the album Billy Currington
- B-side: "Growin' Up Down There"
- Released: April 21, 2003
- Recorded: 2003
- Genre: Country
- Length: 3:43
- Label: Mercury Nashville
- Songwriters: Carson Chamberlain; Casey Beathard; Billy Currington
- Producer: Carson Chamberlain

Billy Currington singles chronology
"Walk a Little Straighter" (2003)	"I Got a Feelin'" (2004)

Music video
- "Walk a Little Straighter" at CMT.com

"Walk a Little Straighter" is a song co-written and recorded by American country music artist Billy Currington. It was released in April 2003 as his debut single and the first from his self-titled debut album. The song peaked at number 8 on the U.S. Billboard Hot Country Singles & Tracks chart. Currington wrote this song with Casey Beathard and Carson Chamberlain.

== Content ==
Currington wrote the chorus to "Walk a Little Straighter" when he was twelve years old. The song is about witnessing his own father's alcoholism, and how he wishes not to pass that trait onto his own children.

== Chart performance ==
"Walk a Little Straighter" debuted at number 56 on the U.S. Billboard Hot Country Singles & Tracks for the week of May 3, 2003.

Chart (2003)	Peak position
US Hot Country Songs (Billboard)	8
US Billboard Hot 100	67

=== Year-end charts ===
Chart (2003)	Position
US Country Songs (Billboard)	45

== Release history ==
Release dates and format(s) for "Walk a Little Straighter"
Region	Date	Format(s)	Label(s)	Ref.
United States	April 21, 2003	Country radio	Mercury Nashville	
