= Billy Currington (album) =

Studio album by Billy Currington
- Released: September 30, 2003
- Recorded: 2003
- Genre: Country
- Length: 36:33
- Label: Mercury Nashville
- Producer: Carson Chamberlain

Billy Currington chronology
Billy Currington (2003)	Doin' Somethin' Right (2005)

Singles from Billy Currington
- 1. "Walk a Little Straighter" Released: April 21, 2003; 2. "I Got a Feelin'" Released: January 5, 2004

Professional ratings
Review scores
Source	Rating
Country Standard Time	

Billy Currington is the debut studio album by American country music singer Billy Currington. It was released in September 2003 via Mercury Records Nashville. The album produced the singles "Walk a Little Straighter" and "I Got a Feelin'". Both were Top 10 hits on the U.S. Billboard Hot Country Songs chart, peaking at numbers 8 and 5 respectively. The song "Ain't What It Used to Be" was later recorded by Megan Mullins, whose version was released as a single in 2006. Currington co-wrote all but one of the songs on the album.

== Track listing ==
No.	Title	Writer(s)	Length
1.	"I Got a Feelin'"	Carson Chamberlain, Casey Beathard, Billy Currington	3:14
2.	"That's Just Me"	Michael White, Lee Thomas Miller, Currington	3:00
3.	"Hangin' Around"	Chamberlain, Beathard, Currington	3:19
4.	"Off My Rocker"	Mark D. Sanders, Chamberlain, Currington	3:09
5.	"Walk a Little Straighter"	Chamberlain, Beathard, Currington	3:44
6.	"Where the Girls Are"	Chamberlain, Beathard, Currington	3:13
7.	"Time with You"	Chamberlain, Beathard, Currington	3:45
8.	"When She Gets Close to Me"	Marla Cannon-Goodman, Michael Gerald Lunn, Currington	3:35
9.	"Growin' Up Down There"	Kenny Beard, Beathard, Currington	3:01
10.	"Next Time"	Cannon-Goodman, Beathard, Currington	3:17
11.	"Ain't What It Used to Be"	Mark Nesler, Tony Martin	3:16
Total length:			36:33

== Personnel ==
- Eddie Bayers - drums
- Billy Currington - lead vocals
- Stuart Duncan - fiddle
- Paul Franklin - steel guitar
- Brent Mason - electric guitar
- Gordon Mote - keyboards on "Off My Rocker"
- Gary Prim - keyboards on all tracks except "Off My Rocker"
- John Wesley Ryles - background vocals
- W. David Smith - bass guitar
- John Willis - acoustic guitar, banjo on "Ain't What It Used to Be"

== Chart performance ==
=== Album ===
Chart (2003)	Peak position
U.S. Billboard Top Country Albums	17
U.S. Billboard 200	107
U.S. Billboard Top Heatseekers	1

=== Singles ===
Year	Single	Peak chart positions	
Year	Single	US Country	US
2003	"Walk a Little Straighter"	8	67
2004	"I Got a Feelin'"	5	50
