= Don't It =

Single by Billy Currington

from the album Summer Forever
- Released: October 27, 2014
- Recorded: 2014
- Genre: Country
- Length: 3:09
- Label: Mercury Nashville
- Songwriter(s): Ross Copperman; Ashley Gorley; Jaren Johnston
- Producer(s): Dann Huff

Billy Currington singles chronology
"We Are Tonight" (2013)	"Don't It" (2014)	"Drinkin' Town with a Football Problem" (2015)

"Don't It" is a song written by Ross Copperman, Ashley Gorley, and Jaren Johnston and recorded by American country music artist Billy Currington. It was released in October 2014 as the first single from Currington's 2015 album Summer Forever.

The song became Currington's ninth number one hit on the US Billboard Country Airplay chart. It also peaked at number 4 on Hot Country Songs and at number 44 on the Billboard Hot 100. As of July 2015, the song has sold 404,000 units in the United States. The song even became Currington's first number one single on the Canada Country chart, and it reached number 46 on the Canadian Hot 100. The song's accompanying music video was directed by Peter Zavadil.

== Reception ==
=== Critical ===
Taste of Country gave the song a favorable review, and stated that "the Georgia-based singer continues to nudge his beach-inspired style forward. [A]n infectious melody and the singer’s charm make this song irresistible."

=== Commercial ===
"Don't It" debuted at number 53 on the US Billboard Country Airplay chart for the week of November 8, 2014. It also debuted at number 36 on Hot Country Songs for the week of November 8, 2014. In addition, it even entered the Bubbling Under Hot 100 Singles chart at number 14 for the week of March 7, 2015. It also debuted at number 48 on the Canada Country chart for the week of March 21, 2015, and it entered in at number 76 on the Canadian Hot 100 for the week of April 25, 2015. The song reached number one on the Country Airplay chart for the week of June 6, 2015, becoming Currington's ninth number one country single, and his third consecutive. As of July 2015, the song has sold 404,000 copies in the United States.

== Music video ==
The accompanying music video for the song was directed by Peter Zavadil and premiered in January 2015. The video has Currington performing with his band while also having romantic scenes with a brunette woman.

== Chart performance ==
Chart (2014–2015)	Peak position
Canada (Canadian Hot 100)	46
Canada Country (Billboard)	1
US Billboard Hot 100	44
US Country Airplay (Billboard)	1
US Hot Country Songs (Billboard)	4

=== Year-end charts ===
Chart (2015)	Position
US Country Airplay (Billboard)	20
US Hot Country Songs (Billboard)	33

== Certifications ==
Certifications for Don't It
Region	Certification	Certified units/sales
United States (RIAA)	Platinum	1,000,000^{‡}
^{‡} Sales+streaming figures based on certification alone.
