= People Are Crazy =

Single by Billy Currington

from the album Little Bit of Everything
- Released: March 2, 2009
- Recorded: 2008
- Genre: Country
- Length: 3:52
- Label: Mercury Nashville
- Songwriters: Bobby Braddock; Troy Jones
- Producers: Carson Chamberlain; Billy Currington

Billy Currington singles chronology
"Don't" (2008)	"People Are Crazy" (2009)	"That's How Country Boys Roll" (2009)

Music video
- "People Are Crazy" at CMT.com

"People Are Crazy" is a song written by Bobby Braddock and Troy Jones and recorded by American country music singer Billy Currington. It was released in March 2009 as the second single from Currington's 2008 album Little Bit of Everything. The song became Currington's third number one hit on the US Billboard Hot Country Songs chart. On December 2, 2009, the song was nominated for two Grammy Awards for Best Male Country Vocal Performance and Best Country Song. The song was also nominated for "Song of the Year" at the 2010 Academy of Country Music Awards.

== Content ==
"People Are Crazy" centralizes on the male narrator and an old, divorced war veteran whom he meets in a bar. In the first verse, the two of them converse, which leads to the old man saying, "God is great, beer is good / And people are crazy." They continue to converse throughout the second verse as well, with the old man hinting that he is terminally ill with a smoking-related illness, before parting ways in the bridge. In the third verse, the old man dies. The narrator discovers that the old man was a millionaire famous enough to warrant a "front page obituary" and "left his fortune to / Some guy he barely knew" (i.e., the narrator) over the objections of the old man's children. After this discovery, the narrator visits the old man's grave and declares that the old man was right. The song has a 4/4 time signature and a moderate tempo, and is set in the key of F major, using a main chord pattern of F–C–Dm–B♭. Currington's vocals range from B♭_{2} to D_{4}.

According to the blog maintained by the television network CMT, Currington said of the song, "It’s one of those that lifts your spirits and make you laugh. I knew the first time I heard it, I wanted to lay it down and record it for the album."

Bobby Braddock and Troy Jones wrote the song after Jones gave Braddock the idea for the line "God is great, beer is good / And people are crazy." Jones was in Alabama and decided to take a drive through the country. He was trying to think of three things you can't argue with and came up with the three things. When the two were writing the song, Braddock then suggested the twist ending.

== Music video ==
The music video was shot by the Brads, a directing duo consisting of Potsy Ponciroli and Blake McClure.

== Critical reception ==
In his review of the album, Billboard critic Mikael Wood said that the song was a "briskly strummed country-rock number" that "handily reduces [Currington]'s worldview to a memorable one-liner", and added that the rest of the album "doesn't do much to complicate that philosophy". Matt Bjorke of Roughstock gave the song a positive review, saying that "It goes a long way into proving just what is great about country music: the stories and simple, effective melodies." Writing for MusicRow, Robert K. Oermann praised the song's narrative as well as the inclusion of Currington's whistling at the end. Juli Thanki of Engine 145 gave the song a thumbs-down rating, saying that it was "feel-good like a Reader's Digest story" and did not have a country music sound other than "an occasionally audible steel guitar lick."

== Charts ==
Chart (2009)	Peak position
US Hot Country Songs (Billboard)	1
US Billboard Hot 100	27
Canada Country (Billboard)	2
Canada Hot 100 (Billboard)	48

=== Year-end charts ===
Chart (2009)	Position
US Billboard Hot 100	93
US Country Songs (Billboard)	7

== Certifications ==
Certifications for People Are Crazy
Region	Certification	Certified units/sales
United States (RIAA)	4× Platinum	4,000,000^{‡}
^{‡} Sales+streaming figures based on certification alone.
