= I Got a Feelin' (Billy Currington song) =

Single by Billy Currington

from the album Billy Currington
- B-side: "Time with You"
- Released: January 19, 2004
- Recorded: 2003
- Genre: Country
- Length: 3:14
- Label: Mercury Nashville
- Songwriters: Billy Currington; Carson Chamberlain; Casey Beathard
- Producer: Carson Chamberlain

Billy Currington singles chronology
"Walk a Little Straighter" (2003)	"I Got a Feelin'" (2004)	"Must Be Doin' Somethin' Right" (2005)

Music video
- "I Got a Feelin'" at CMT.com

"I Got a Feelin'" is a song co-written and recorded by American country music singer Billy Currington. It was released in January 2004 as the second and final single from his 2003 self-titled debut album. The song peaked at number 5 on the U.S. Billboard Hot Country Songs chart in mid-2004. It also reached number 50 on the Billboard Hot 100. Currington wrote this song with Casey Beathard and Carson Chamberlain.

== Critical reception ==
In his review of the album, Jeffrey B. Remz of Country Standard Time viewed the song favorably, saying that it showed Currington's traditional country sound by the prominence of fiddle (played by Stuart Duncan).

== Music videos ==
The music video for the track was directed by Philip Andelman, filmed in the Mojave Desert in California, and co-stars Gena Lee Nolin.

== Chart performance ==
"I Got a Feelin'" debuted at number 53 on the U.S. Billboard Hot Country Singles & Tracks chart for the week of January 17, 2004.

== Charts ==
=== Weekly charts ===
Chart (2004)	Peak position
Canada Country (Radio & Records)	9
US Hot Country Songs (Billboard)	5
US Billboard Hot 100	50

=== Year-end charts ===
Chart (2004)	Position
US Country Songs (Billboard)	25

== Release history ==
Release dates and format(s) for "I Got a Feelin'"
Region	Date	Format(s)	Label(s)	Ref.
United States	January 19, 2004	Country radio	Mercury Nashville	
