= Love Done Gone =

Single by Billy Currington

from the album Enjoy Yourself
- Released: April 18, 2011
- Recorded: 2010
- Genre: Country, Dixieland jazz
- Length: 3:32
- Label: Mercury Nashville
- Songwriters: Shawn Camp; Marv Green
- Producers: Carson Chamberlain; Billy Currington

Billy Currington singles chronology
"Let Me Down Easy" (2010)	"Love Done Gone" (2011)	"Like My Dog" (2011)

"Love Done Gone" is a song co-written by Shawn Camp and Marv Green and recorded by American country music artist Billy Currington. It was released in April 2011 as the third single from Currington’s 2010 album Enjoy Yourself and the twelfth of his career.

The song peaked at number 11 on the U.S. Billboard Hot Country Songs chart and number 58 on the Billboard Hot 100. It also charted at number 83 on the Canadian Hot 100. The song has even received positive reviews from music critics.

== Background and writing ==
Co-writer Shawn Camp told Taste of Country that at a songwriting session, Marv Green came in with some of the lyrics in the verses, but had no title for the song. They then decided to keep working on the song and the verses they had already. "I was thinking of a situation my brother was in at the time," said Green. "He was going through a breakup, and he was at the point in the relationship where he was fine with it coming to an end. They had their fun, but it was over." The song was originally on hold for George Strait, but once it came off hold, Currington cut the song.

== Content ==
The narrator discusses moving on from a relationship that was not working anymore, but also expressing that he has no regrets about the results, and that he is happier for both of them.

The main riff of the song is played on a horn section with backing vocalists singing "ba-ba-da, ba-da-ba" to the melody of the riff. Camp chose to add horns to the song after hearing a pop song with a similar effect while at a shopping mall.

== Critical reception ==
The song has received positive reviews from music critics who have praised the song's sad content for being filled with lively production. C.M. Wilcox of The 9513 gave the song a "thumbs up" and praised the lyrics for focusing on the "exhilarating part of moving beyond a relationship that[…]simply was not working anymore." He also called the song "a lively fusion of contemporary country and Dixieland jazz". Michael McCall of the Associated Press (AP) thought that the song was "Beach Boys-inspired", and Gary Graff of Billboard said that it "mix[es] a tale of romantic woe with a bouncy, buoyant rhythm". Stephen Thomas Erlewine of Allmusic said that the album was "such a low-key, lazy record[…]that the singsongy chorus of 'Love Done Gone' positively blares".

== Music video ==
The music video was directed by Potsy Ponciroli and premiered in July 2011. It was filmed in New Orleans, Louisiana.

== Chart performance ==
Chart (2011)	Peak position
US Hot Country Songs (Billboard)	11
US Billboard Hot 100	58
Canada Country (Billboard)	6
Canada Hot 100 (Billboard)	83

=== Year-end charts ===
Chart (2011)	Position
US Country Songs (Billboard)	47
