= Little Bit of Everything =

Studio album by Billy Currington
- Released: October 14, 2008
- Genre: Country
- Length: 42:47
- Label: Mercury Nashville
- Producer: Carson Chamberlain; Billy Currington

Billy Currington chronology
Doin' Somethin' Right (2005)	Little Bit of Everything (2008)	Enjoy Yourself (2010)

Singles from Little Bit of Everything
- 1. "Don't" Released: July 21, 2008; 2. "People Are Crazy" Released: March 2, 2009; 3. "That's How Country Boys Roll" Released: September 14, 2009

Professional ratings
Review scores
Source	Rating
Allmusic	4/5 stars

Little Bit of Everything is the third studio album by American country music singer Billy Currington. It was released on October 14, 2008 via Mercury Nashville. Its lead-off single, "Don't", became his sixth Top 10 hit on the U.S. Billboard Hot Country Songs chart. Before that song, Currington released a song in late 2007 called "Tangled Up", which peaked at number 30 and was not included on an album. "People Are Crazy" was released as the second single in March 2009 and became Currington's third number one hit in August 2009. The third single, "That's How Country Boys Roll," was released in September 2009 and became his fourth Number One single in March 2010. The album has sold over 500,000 copies as of October 2010.

== Track listing ==
No.	Title	Writer(s)	Length
1.	"Swimmin' in Sunshine"	Brett Beavers; Jim Beavers	4:46
2.	"Life and Love and the Meaning Of"	Billy Currington; Tony Martin; Mark Nesler	3:40
3.	"Every Reason Not to Go"	Currington; Martin; Nesler	4:12
4.	"Don't"	J. Beavers; Jonathan Singleton	3:57
5.	"People Are Crazy"	Bobby Braddock; Troy Jones	3:52
6.	"Everything"	J. Beavers; Chris Hennessee	4:20
7.	"Walk On"	Ashley Gorley; Wade Kirby; Bryan Simpson	3:58
8.	"No One Has Eyes Like You"	Currington; Brett Jones	2:58
9.	"That's How Country Boys Roll"	Currington; Dallas Davidson; B. Jones	3:44
10.	"I Shall Return"	Currington; Bob DiPiero; Scotty Emerick	3:11
11.	"Heal Me"	Tony Stampley; Bonnie Swayze	4:09

== Personnel ==
- Billy Currington - lead vocals
- Chip Davis - background vocals
- Scotty Emerick - gut string guitar on "I Shall Return"
- Paul Franklin - steel guitar on all tracks except "That's How Country Boys Roll", lap steel guitar on "That's How Country Boys Roll"
- Tony Harrell - keyboards
- Wes Hightower - background vocals
- Troy Lancaster - electric guitar
- Paul Leim - drums
- Brent Mason - electric guitar
- W. David Smith - bass guitar
- Biff Watson - acoustic guitar

== Chart performance ==
=== Weekly charts ===
Chart (2008)	Peak position
US Billboard 200	9
US Top Country Albums (Billboard)	2

=== Year-end charts ===
Chart (2009)	Position
US Billboard 200	138
US Top Country Albums (Billboard)	23
Chart (2010)	Position
US Top Country Albums (Billboard)	55

=== Singles ===
Year	Single	Peak chart positions		
Year	Single	US Country	US	CAN
2008	"Don't"	2	52	91
2009	"People Are Crazy"	1	27	48
2009	"That's How Country Boys Roll"	1	57	67

== Certifications ==
Region	Certification
United States (RIAA)	Gold
