= Drinkin' Town with a Football Problem =

Single by Billy Currington

from the album Summer Forever
- Released: June 8, 2015
- Recorded: 2014–15
- Genre: Country
- Length: 4:14
- Label: Mercury Nashville
- Songwriter(s): Elizabeth Elkins; Aaron Henningsen; Brian Henningsen; Clara Henningsen; Vanessa Olivarez
- Producer(s): Dann Huff

Billy Currington singles chronology
"Don't It" (2014)	"Drinkin' Town with a Football Problem" (2015)	"It Don't Hurt Like It Used To" (2016)

"Drinkin' Town with a Football Problem" is a song written by Elizabeth Elkins, Aaron Henningsen, Brian Henningsen, Clara Henningsen, and Vanessa Olivarez and recorded by American country music artist Billy Currington. It was released to radio on June 8, 2015 as the second single from Currington's 2015 album, Summer Forever.

== Content ==
"Drinkin' Town with a Football Problem" is an anthem about a small town whose residents are passionate about high school football, referring to the town as a "drinkin' town with a football problem". It uses "lyrics with a series of snapshots that are familiar in every U.S. community, including cheerleaders, old men in bleachers and national-anthem performances."

Currington said that the song was nostalgic for him: "That song reminded me of my high school hometown football team...But, at the same time, there are so many towns we have played in that resemble that, too. It reminds me of so many places I’ve been a part of. I think a lot of people will relate to it.” The song was inspired by the town of Atwood, Illinois, the hometown of co-writer Brian Henningsen (of The Henningsens), who played on the town's high school football team in the late 1970s.

Dann Huff produced the song, which was recorded at Blackbird Studios, owned by Martina McBride and her husband, John. It opens with a sung "hey, y'all" hook sung by Currington in six overdubbed vocal lines, with assistance from session vocalist Russell Terrell. This was the first song on which Currington had ever overdubbed his own harmonies. Kenny Greenberg plays lead guitar, using a B-Bender on the solos.

== Commercial reception ==
Although the song debuted at number 41 on the Country Airplay chart, it fell to #54 in its second week before climbing. It ultimately reached a peak of number 30.

== Charts ==
Chart (2015)	Peak position
US Country Airplay (Billboard)	30
US Hot Country Songs (Billboard)	41
