= It Don't Hurt Like It Used To =

Single by Billy Currington

from the album Summer Forever
- Released: February 8, 2016
- Recorded: 2015
- Genre: Country
- Length: 3:05
- Label: Mercury Nashville
- Songwriters: Billy Currington; Cary Barlowe; Shy Carter
- Producer: Dann Huff

Billy Currington singles chronology
"Drinkin' Town with a Football Problem" (2015)	"It Don't Hurt Like It Used To" (2016)	"Do I Make You Wanna" (2016)

"It Don't Hurt Like It Used To" is a song co-written and recorded by American country music artist Billy Currington. It was released to radio on February 8, 2016 as the third single from his 2015 album, Summer Forever. Currington wrote this song with Cary Barlowe and Shy Carter.

== Background ==
"It Don't Hurt Like It Used To" is the only song that Currington co-wrote on his Summer Forever album. According to Currington, he happened to visit his friends Barlowe and Carter: "Cary and I picked up guitars at the same time and played basically the same chord, and the next thing you know, we were writing the song." He said, "I remember I just started saying all the words that you hear in the beginning of the song, they just started falling out. Shy was like, ‘What was that, man?’ I said, ‘I don’t know, it’s just coming out.’ So we wrote ’em down, and then I guess within an hour the song had basically written itself."

The song is about the breakup of a relationship. According to Currington, the line "But you drug my heart through the Alabama dirt" was inspired by a past relationship.

== Commercial performance ==
The song first entered Country Airplay at No. 59 for the chart of February 20, 2016 on its radio release. It entered the Hot Country Songs chart at No. 49 on chart dated April 16, 2016. In October 2016, it reached No. 1 on Country Airplay, becoming Currington's tenth No. 1 on that chart, and it remained in that spot for two consecutive weeks. It has sold 332,000 copies in the United States as of January 2017.

== Charts ==
=== Weekly charts ===
Chart (2016)	Peak position
Canada Hot 100 (Billboard)	77
Canada Country (Billboard)	1
US Billboard Hot 100	44
US Country Airplay (Billboard)	1
US Hot Country Songs (Billboard)	3

=== Year-end charts ===
Chart (2016)	Position
US Country Airplay (Billboard)	16
US Hot Country Songs (Billboard)	31

== Certifications ==
Certifications for It Don't Hurt Like It Used To
Region	Certification	Certified units/sales
United States (RIAA)	Platinum	1,000,000^{‡}
^{‡} Sales+streaming figures based on certification alone.
