= Don't (Billy Currington song) =

Single by Billy Currington

from the album Little Bit of Everything
- Released: July 21, 2008
- Genre: Country, country soul
- Length: 3:57
- Label: Mercury Nashville
- Songwriters: Jim Beavers; Jonathan Singleton
- Producers: Carson Chamberlain; Billy Currington

Billy Currington singles chronology
"Tangled Up" (2007)	"Don't" (2008)	"People Are Crazy" (2009)

Music video
- "Don't" at CMT.com

"Don't" is a song written by Jim Beavers and Jonathan Singleton and recorded by American country music artist Billy Currington. It was released in July 2008 as the first single from Currington's 2008 album Little Bit of Everything. For the week of February 7, 2009, the song became Currington's fifth Top 10 hit on the U.S. Billboard Hot Country Songs chart, peaking at number 2 behind Blake Shelton's "She Wouldn't Be Gone".

== Content ==
In the lyric, the male narrator asks that his lover stay with him after a sexual encounter the night before. Jonathan Singleton and Jim Beavers were inspired to write "Don't" after spending a day listening to R&B music. According to Country Weekly, Beavers "started it with the groove and vibe, which had the kind of sexy R&B feel to it, with the idea of a guy begging his girl not to leave." Singleton said that he considered it "unusual" for the chorus to begin with "baby, baby, don't", and after realizing that the word "don't" appeared several times in the lyric, they decided to name the song "Don't".

Currington recorded the song in one take. During the session, electric guitarist Brent Mason ad-libbed a "wah-wah" sound, which Currington asked to be left in the final recording.

== Critical reception ==
Stephen Thomas Erlewine of Allmusic described the song as having a "sleek '80s sheen". Jessica Phillips of Country Standard Time said that it had a "suggestive R&B strut and pleading chorus."

== Music video ==
The accompanying music video for this song was directed by "The Brads". It was shot in downtown Nashville and shows Currington carrying two cups of coffee, one of which is intended for his female partner. Upon entering her apartment, he finds that she has left in a cab. He then runs down a fire escape and jumps into an alleyway, before driving off to catch up with the cab. Currington performed all of the video's stunts himself.

== Charts ==
=== Weekly charts ===
Chart (2008–2009)	Peak position
Canada Country (Billboard)	14
Canada Hot 100 (Billboard)	91
US Hot Country Songs (Billboard)	2
US Billboard Hot 100	52

=== Year-end charts ===
Chart (2009)	Position
US Hot Country Songs (Billboard)	43
