= Billy Currington =

American country musician (born 1973)

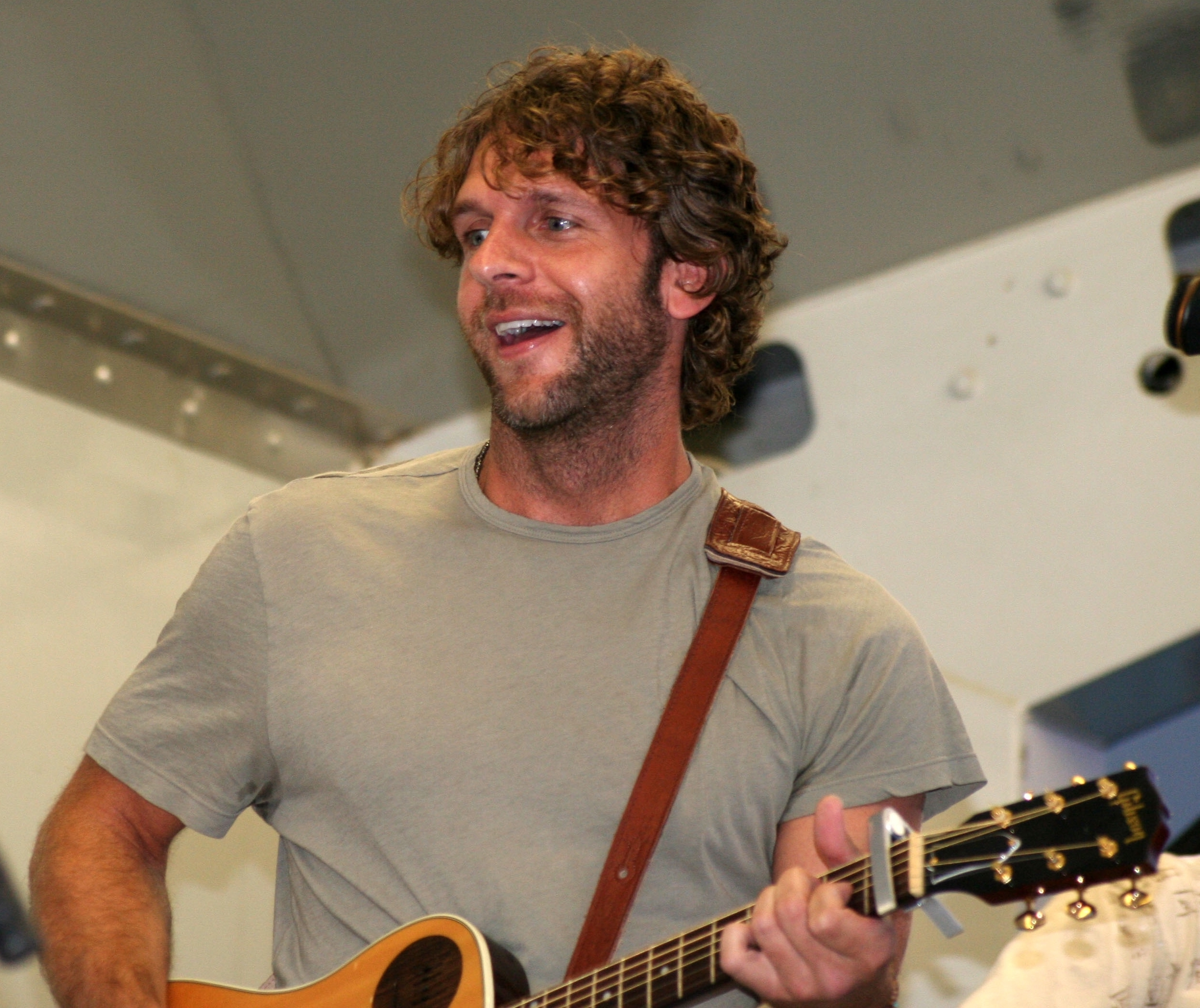
- Currington in August 2008

Background information
- Born: William Matthew Currington; November 19, 1973 (age 52); Savannah, Georgia, U.S.
- Origin: Rincon, Georgia, U.S.
- Genres: Country; country pop; country rock
- Occupations: Singer; songwriter
- Instruments: Vocals; guitar
- Years active: 1996–present
- Label: Mercury Nashville
- Website: billycurrington.com

William Matthew Currington (born November 19, 1973) is an American country music singer and songwriter. Signed to Mercury Records Nashville in 2003, he has released seven studio albums for the label: his self-titled debut (2003), Doin' Somethin' Right (2005), Little Bit of Everything (2008), Enjoy Yourself (2010), We Are Tonight (2013), Summer Forever (2015), Intuition (2021), And King Of The World (2025)

Five out of the Seven albums have produced 18 singles on the U.S. Billboard Hot Country Songs and Country Airplay charts, including 11 number one hits: "Must Be Doin' Somethin' Right", "Good Directions", "People Are Crazy", "That's How Country Boys Roll", "Pretty Good at Drinkin' Beer", "Let Me Down Easy", "Hey Girl", "We Are Tonight", "Don't It", "It Don't Hurt Like It Used To", and "Do I Make You Wanna". Currington has also charted as a duet partner on Shania Twain's single "Party for Two", and his own non-album single "Tangled Up", for a total of 20 top 40 hits.

Setting a new record in August 2017 with his number-one single "Do I Make You Wanna", Currington is the only country music artist in US Billboard Country Airplay chart history to have a song in the number one spot gain an audience of nearly 9,500,000 over another country music artist's song in the number two spot.

== Early life and career ==
Billy Currington was born in Savannah, Georgia, raised in Rincon, Georgia, and currently lives in Savannah, Georgia. He has four sisters (Lexie, Ann, Kim, and Kellie) and two brothers (Charles and Jason).

When he was a junior in Effingham County High School (Springfield, Georgia), Currington auditioned for a spot at Opryland, the renowned country music theme park located in Nashville. Failing the audition, after high school he moved to Nashville to pursue his career in country music. His first stint did not last too long, and he later sang for a bar named Cavalier Country Club in Georgia. In Nashville, Currington also worked for a concrete company, and as a personal trainer.

One of the clients he worked with as a personal trainer led Currington to recording demo tapes, as well as writing songs. He eventually had cuts by George Strait, Tracy Byrd, and Marty Raybon. After almost being offered to join RCA Records, he signed to Mercury Records in 2003.

Currington founded the Global South Relief organization which delivers supplies to those in need in Central American countries.

== Musical career ==
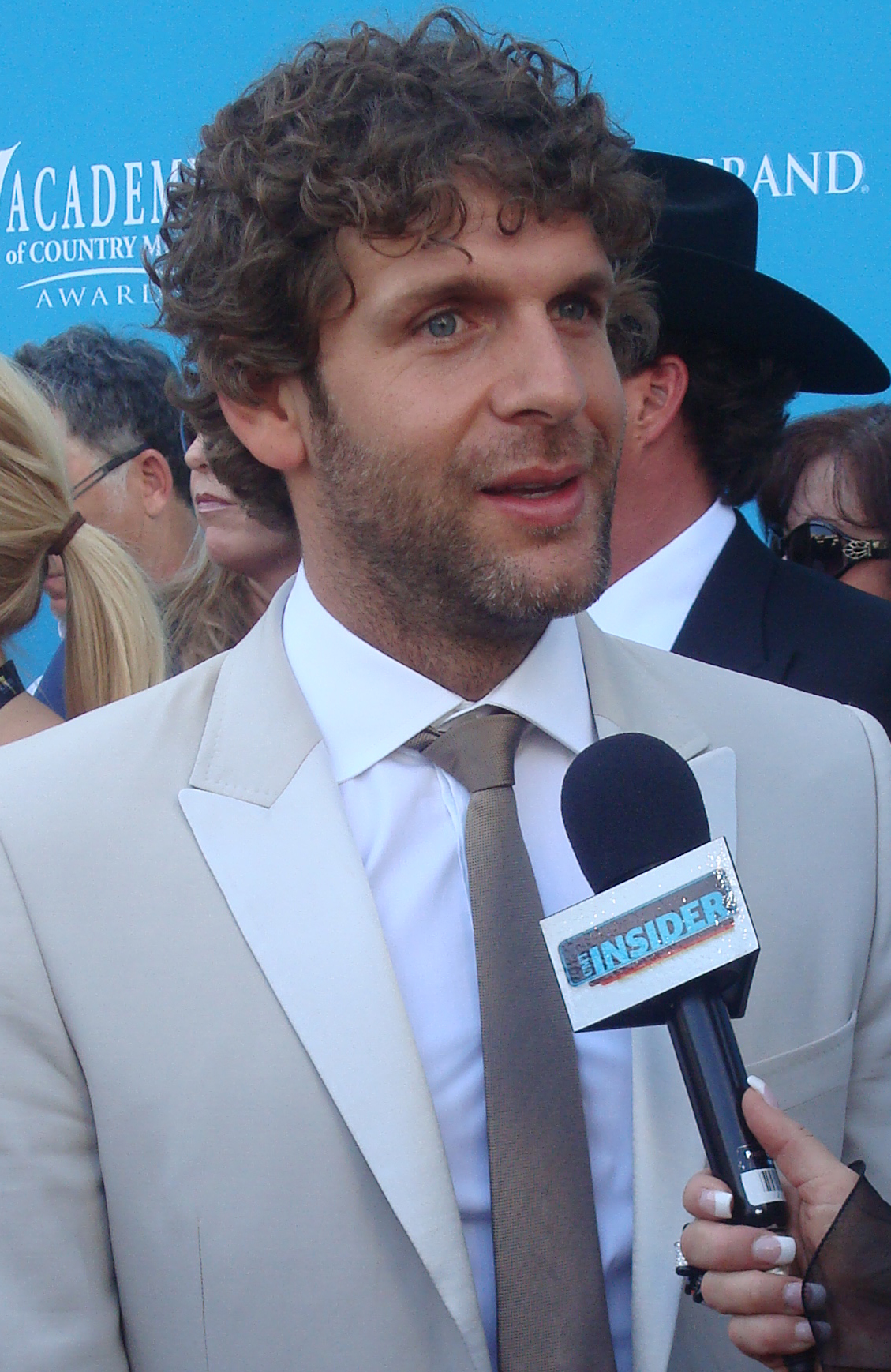
Currington in April 2010

=== Billy Currington (2003–2004) ===
Currington's self-titled debut album was released in September 2003; the album's first single was "Walk a Little Straighter". This song is about his relationship with his alcoholic stepfather, including a chorus that Currington wrote when he was just 12 years old. "Walk a Little Straighter" went to No.8 that year on the Hot Country Songs chart. Also, it allowed Currington to become a major country performer in Nashville. The second single from the album, "I Got a Feelin'", became the singer's first Top 5 on the US country charts, with a peak at No.5.

He scored a third consecutive top 10 hit with Shania Twain in late 2004 with the song "Party for Two". The song was from Twain's Greatest Hits album and was released in two formats: a pop version with Mark McGrath as Twain's duet partner, and the country version, which featured Currington.

=== Doin' Somethin' Right (2005–2007) ===
In 2005, Currington released his second studio album Doin' Somethin' Right, which peaked at No.2 on the Top Country Albums chart and at No.11 on the Billboard 200. This album produced his first number one hit with "Must Be Doin' Somethin' Right", followed by "Why, Why, Why" at No.13 and another number one hit with "Good Directions". Co-written by Capitol Records artist Luke Bryan, "Good Directions" was the No.2 country song of 2007 according to the Billboard Year-End charts. Doin' Somethin' Right was certified platinum by the RIAA. The album also featured "Lucille", a song that Currington covered from original artist Kenny Rogers.

=== Little Bit of Everything (2007–2009) ===
On July 19, 2007, Currington announced that he would cancel the rest of his tour dates for the year because of laryngitis. His 2007 single, "Tangled Up", peaked at No.30 in late 2007, and the release of his third studio album was delayed.

He was absent from the charts for nearly a year before the release of his next single, "Don't", in mid-2008. That song was the first single from his third studio album, which was entitled Little Bit of Everything. The album was released on October 14. Currington co-wrote five of the songs on it. "Don't" peaked at No.2 on the country charts in early 2009. "People Are Crazy", co-written by Bobby Braddock and Troy Jones, was released as the second single from the album in March 2009 and became his third number one hit in July 2009. The third single, "That's How Country Boys Roll", became his fourth number one hit in March 2010. The song was the first that Currington shared writing credit on to reach number one.

On August 1, 2009, Currington suffered a concussion at the Big Valley Jamboree in Camrose, Alberta after the stage on which he was performing collapsed during a massive wind storm that also injured the singer's bass guitarist and killed a spectator.

=== Enjoy Yourself (2010–2012) ===
In May 2010, Currington released his tenth single overall, "Pretty Good at Drinkin' Beer", which hit No.1 in September. Also written by Troy Jones, it was the first single from his fourth studio album Enjoy Yourself, which was released on September 21, 2010. The album's second single "Let Me Down Easy" was released on October 4, 2010, and reached No.1 in 2011. The third single "Love Done Gone", released to country radio on April 18, 2011, and reached No.11 later that year. Its fourth single "Like My Dog" released to country radio on October 10, 2011, and peaked at No.24 in 2012.

=== We Are Tonight (2013–2014) ===
Currington's fifth studio album, We Are Tonight, was released on September 17, 2013. The album's first single, "Hey Girl", was released in March 2013. It peaked at number one on the Country Airplay chart in October of that year. The album's second single, the title track, was released on November 18, 2013. It also peaked at No.1 on the Country Airplay chart, this time in August 2014.

=== Summer Forever (2014–2017) ===
Currington released a new single, the first from his sixth studio album, in late October 2014, titled "Don't It". The album, Summer Forever, was released on June 2, 2015. The album's second single, "Drinkin' Town with a Football Problem", was released on June 8, 2015. "It Don't Hurt Like It Used To" was released on February 8, 2016, as the album's third single. It reached number one on Country Airplay in October 2016, remaining in that spot for two consecutive weeks. The album's fourth single, "Do I Make You Wanna", was released on November 21, 2016. The song reached number one on the Country Airplay chart in August 2017 and stayed there for three consecutive weeks, making it Currington's third number-one single from this album. "Wake Me Up", the album's fifth and final single, was released in September 2017.

=== Intuition (2018–present) ===
"Bring It On Over" was released to country radio on September 24, 2018. It debuted and peaked at No.29 on the Billboard Country Airplay charts. "Details" was released in 2019 and was also a minor top 40 hit on the same chart. The Stay Up 'Til the Sun Tour began on October 4, 2019, in Arizona and included nine concerts in total. He ended the tour in Florida.

Currington's seventh studio album, Intuition, was released on August 6, 2021. Currington co-wrote the album with producer Rob Persaud. It was a surprise release, in that it was not announced with advance warning and no new singles were released prior to the album to promote it, nor did it include either of his previous standalone singles. Intuition serves as a musical departure from his previous work as it was not marketed as a country album and instead drew inspirations from "synth pop, Eighties R&B, and tropical house".

== Personal life ==
On April 24, 2013, the Chatham County, Georgia, Grand Jury indicted Currington on felony criminal charges of "abuse of an elder person by inflicting mental anguish" and "making terroristic threats". Both criminal charges stemmed from an incident involving boat captain Charles Harvey Ferrelle on April 15, 2013. The indictment alleged that Currington had made terrorist threats to Ferrelle. Currington was later released from a Georgia jail after posting $27,700 bond. Had he been convicted, Currington would have faced a prison term of 1 to 5 years. Also, on April 26, 2013, as a result of negative press surrounding the indictment incident, the Charlotte Motor Speedway replaced Currington as a performer for its All Star pre-race entertainment. He entered a "not guilty" plea in August 2013.

On September 25, 2013, Currington pleaded no contest to the abuse charge; the terroristic threats charge was dropped. Currington was sentenced to five years probation, a $1,000 fine, and anger management counseling; he was also required to have no contact with the boat captain.

== Awards and nominations ==
Year	Association	Category	Result
2006	CMT Music Awards	Hottest Video of the Year — "Must Be Doin' Something Right"	Won
2006	Academy of Country Music Awards	Top New Male Vocalist	Nominated
2010	Grammy Award	Male Country Vocal Performance — "People Are Crazy"	Nominated
2010	Academy of Country Music Awards	Single Record of the Year — "People Are Crazy"	Nominated
2010	Academy of Country Music Awards	Song of the Year — "People Are Crazy"	Nominated

2005 CMA Awards - Musical Event of the Year (nominee) - Party For Two with Shania Twain

== Discography ==
Studio albums

- Billy Currington (2003)
- Doin' Somethin' Right (2005)
- Little Bit of Everything (2008)
- Enjoy Yourself (2010)
- We Are Tonight (2013)
- Summer Forever (2015)
- Intuition (2021)
- King of the World (2025)

== Tours ==
Headlining

- Summer Forever Tour (2016)
- Stay Up 'Til The Sun (2017, 2019)

Supporting

- Play On Tour with Carrie Underwood (2010)
- Goin' Coastal Tour with Kenny Chesney and the Zac Brown Band (2011)
- Take Me Downtown Tour with Lady Antebellum (2014)
- Shotgun Rider Tour with Tim McGraw (2015)
- Billy Currington & Kip Moore (2026)
