= Jackson Browne discography =

Cataloging of published recordings by Jackson Browne

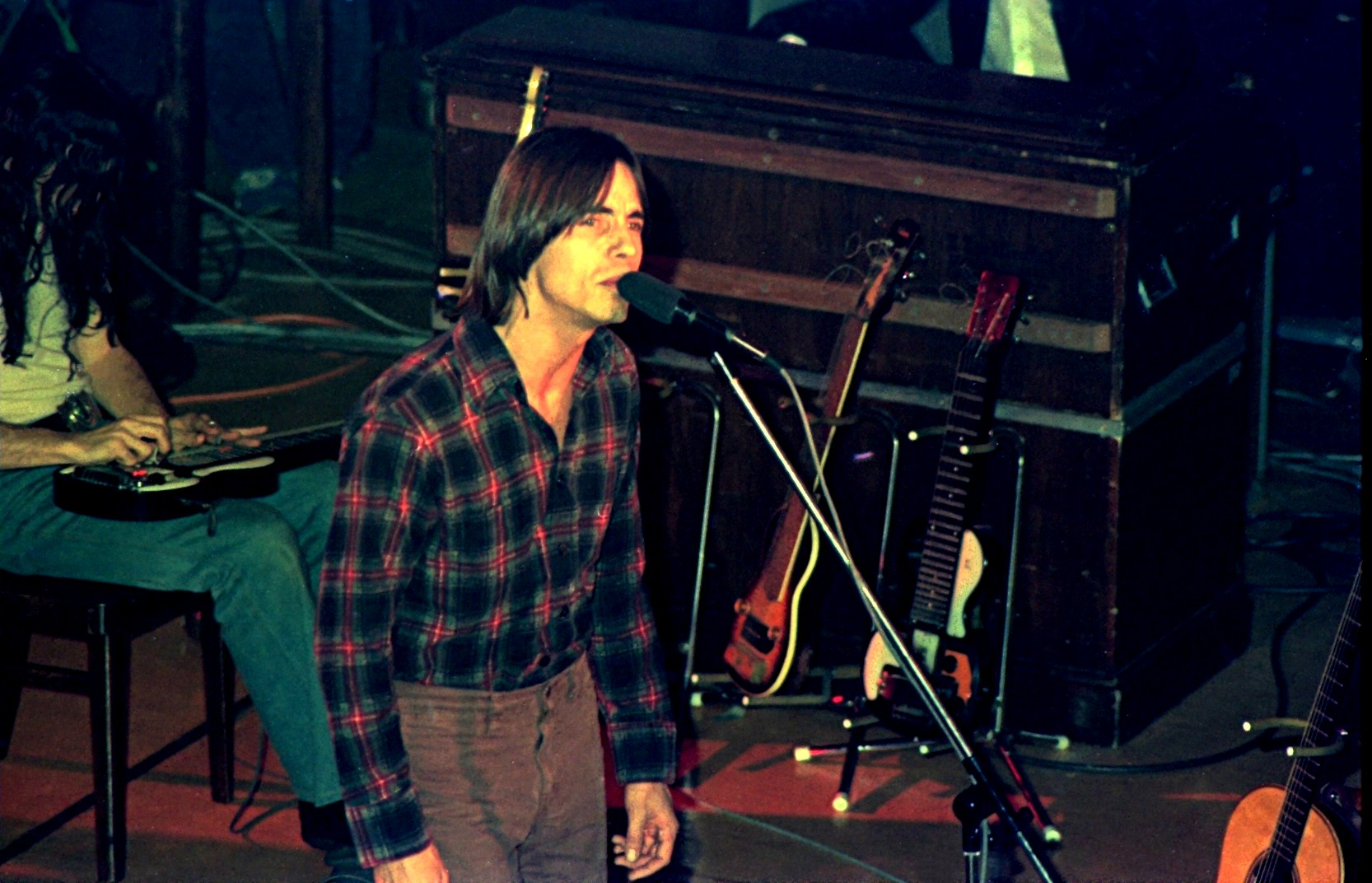
- Browne performing in 1976
- Studio albums: 15
- Singles: 49

Here is the discography of American rock singer-songwriter and musician Jackson Browne.

== Albums ==
=== Studio albums ===
| Year | Album | Chart positions | | | Certifications |
| Year | Album | US | AUS | UK | Certifications |
|---|---|---|---|---|---|
| 1972 | Jackson Browne (a.k.a. Saturate Before Using): Released: January 2, 1972; Label: Asylum; Format: | 53 | 20 | — | RIAA: Platinum |
| 1973 | For Everyman: Released: October 1973; Label: Asylum; Format: | 43 | 48 | — | RIAA: Platinum |
| 1974 | Late for the Sky: Released: September 13, 1974; Label: Asylum; Format: | 14 | 63 | — | RIAA: Platinum |
| 1976 | The Pretender: Released: November 1976; Label: Asylum; Format: | 5 | 18 | 26 | RIAA: 3× Platinum; BPI: Silver |
| 1977 | Running on Empty: Released: December 6, 1977; Label: Asylum; Format: | 3 | 8 | – | RIAA: 7× Platinum; ARIA: 3× Platinum; BPI: Gold |
| 1980 | Hold Out: Released: June 24, 1980; Label: Asylum; Format: | 1 | 6 | 44 | RIAA: 2× Platinum; ARIA: Platinum |
| 1983 | Lawyers in Love: Released: August 2, 1983; Label: Elektra/Asylum; Format: | 8 | 15 | 37 | RIAA: Platinum |
| 1986 | Lives in the Balance: Released: February 18, 1986; Label: Asylum; Format: | 23 | 37 | 36 | RIAA: Gold |
| 1989 | World in Motion: Released: June 6, 1989; Label: Elektra; Format: | 45 | 59 | 39 | |
| 1993 | I'm Alive: Released: October 26, 1993; Label: Elektra; Format: | 40 | — | 35 | RIAA: Gold |
| 1996 | Looking East: Released: February 13, 1996; Label: Elektra; Format: | 36 | 43 | 47 | |
| 2002 | The Naked Ride Home: Released: September 24, 2002; Label: Elektra; Format: | 36 | — | 53 | |
| 2008 | Time the Conqueror: Released: September 23, 2008; Label: Inside Recordings; Format: | 20 | 62 | 57 | |
| 2014 | Standing in the Breach: Released: October 7, 2014; Label: Inside Recordings; Format: | 15 | — | 31 | |
| 2021 | Downhill from Everywhere: Released: July 23, 2021; Label: Inside Recordings; Format: | 86 | — | 35 | |
"—" denotes releases that did not chart

=== Compilation and live albums ===
| Year | Album | Chart positions | | | Certifications |
| Year | Album | US | AUS | UK | Certifications |
|---|---|---|---|---|---|
| 1997 | The Next Voice You Hear: The Best of Jackson Browne: Released: September 23, 1997; Label: Elektra; Format: CD, CS | 47 | 90 | 99 | RIAA: Platinum; ARIA: Gold |
| 2004 | The Very Best of Jackson Browne: Released: March 16, 2004; Label: Rhino/Elektra; Format: CD | 46 | — | 53 | RIAA: Gold; BPI: Gold |
| 2005 | Solo Acoustic, Vol. 1 (Live): Released: October 11, 2005; Label: Inside Recordings; Format: CD | 55 | — | 110 | |
| 2008 | Solo Acoustic, Vol. 2 (Live): Released: March 4, 2008; Label: Inside Recordings; Format: CD | 24 | — | 92 | |
| 2010 | Love Is Strange: En Vivo Con Tino (with David Lindley): Released: May 11, 2010; Label: Inside Recordings; Format: CD | 46 | — | 80 | |
| 2017 | The Road East—Live in Japan: Release: October 4, 2017; Label: Inside Recordings; Format: CD (Blu-Spec) | — | — | — | |

== Singles ==
| Year | Title | Peak chart positions | | | | | | | | Album |
| Year | Title | US | US Main | US AC | US AAA | CAN | UK | NZ | AUS | Album |
|---|---|---|---|---|---|---|---|---|---|---|
| 1972 | "Doctor, My Eyes" | 8 | — | 18 | — | 4 | — | — | 45 | Jackson Browne |
| 1972 | "Rock Me on the Water" | 48 | — | — | — | 35 | — | — | — | Jackson Browne |
| 1973 | "Redneck Friend" | 85 | — | — | — | 87 | — | — | — | For Everyman |
| 1973 | "Take It Easy" | — | — | — | — | — | — | — | — | For Everyman |
| 1974 | "Walking Slow" | — | — | — | — | — | — | — | — | Late for the Sky |
| 1974 | "Fountain of Sorrow" | — | — | — | — | — | — | — | — | Late for the Sky |
| 1977 | "Here Come Those Tears Again" | 23 | — | 15 | — | 19 | — | — | 93 | The Pretender |
| 1977 | "The Pretender" | 58 | — | — | — | 89 | — | — | — | The Pretender |
| 1978 | "Running on Empty" | 11 | — | — | — | 4 | — | — | 82 | Running on Empty |
| 1978 | "Stay" | 20 | — | 47 | — | 19 | 12 | 10 | 58 | Running on Empty |
| 1978 | "You Love the Thunder" | 109 | — | — | — | — | — | — | — | Running on Empty |
| 1980 | "Boulevard" | 19 | — | — | — | 4 | — | — | — | Hold Out |
| 1980 | "That Girl Could Sing" | 22 | — | — | — | 61 | — | — | — | Hold Out |
| 1980 | "Hold On Hold Out" | 103 | — | — | — | — | — | — | — | Hold Out |
| 1982 | "Somebody's Baby" | 7 | 4 | 14 | — | 16 | — | — | 26 | Fast Times at Ridgemont High: Music from the Motion Picture |
| 1983 | "Lawyers in Love" | 13 | 4 | 24 | — | 13 | — | — | 28 | Lawyers in Love |
| 1983 | "Tender Is the Night" | 25 | 18 | 24 | — | 49 | — | — | — | Lawyers in Love |
| 1983 | "For a Rocker" | 45 | 7 | — | — | — | — | — | — | Lawyers in Love |
| 1984 | "Cut It Away" | — | 37 | — | — | — | — | — | — | Lawyers in Love |
| 1986 | "For America" | 30 | 3 | 31 | — | 90 | — | — | 84 | Lives in the Balance |
| 1986 | "In the Shape of a Heart" | 70 | 15 | 10 | — | 91 | 66 | — | 95 | Lives in the Balance |
| 1986 | "Lives in the Balance" | — | 33 | — | — | — | — | — | — | Lives in the Balance |
| 1986 | "Black and White" | — | — | — | — | — | — | — | — | Lives in the Balance |
| 1989 | "World In Motion" | — | 4 | — | — | — | — | — | — | World in Motion |
| 1989 | "Chasing You Into the Light" | — | 9 | — | — | — | — | — | — | World in Motion |
| 1989 | "Anything Can Happen" | — | — | 23 | — | — | — | — | — | World in Motion |
| 1993 | "I'm Alive" | 118 | 18 | 28 | — | 15 | 87 | — | — | I'm Alive |
| 1993 | "Miles Away" | — | — | — | — | 74 | — | — | — | I'm Alive |
| 1993 | "My Problem Is You" | — | — | — | — | 59 | — | — | — | I'm Alive |
| 1994 | "Everywhere I Go" | — | — | — | — | — | 67 | — | — | I'm Alive |
| 1994 | "Sky Blue and Black" | — | — | — | — | — | — | — | — | I'm Alive |
| 1995 | "Let It Be Me" (with Timothy B. Schmit) | — | — | — | — | — | — | — | — | Bye Bye, Love (soundtrack) |
| 1996 | "Looking East" | — | — | — | 13 | — | — | — | — | Looking East |
| 1996 | "Some Bridges" | — | — | — | 8 | 9 | — | — | — | Looking East |
| 1996 | "I'm the Cat" | — | — | — | — | — | — | — | — | Looking East |
| 1997 | "The Next Voice You Hear" | — | — | — | 14 | — | — | — | — | The Next Voice You Hear: The Best of Jackson Browne |
| 1997 | "The Rebel Jesus" | — | — | — | — | — | — | — | — | The Next Voice You Hear: The Best of Jackson Browne |
| 2002 | "The Night Inside Me" | — | — | 25 | 11 | — | — | — | — | The Naked Ride Home |
| 2003 | "About My Imagination" | — | — | — | 20 | — | — | — | — | The Naked Ride Home |
| 2004 | "Poor Poor Pitiful Me" (with Bonnie Raitt) | — | — | — | 16 | — | — | — | — | Enjoy Every Sandwich: The Songs of Warren Zevon (tribute album) |
| 2005 | "Lives in the Balance" (Live) | — | — | — | — | — | — | — | — | Solo Acoustic, Vol. 1 |
| 2009 | "Here" | — | — | — | — | — | — | — | — | digital non-album single |
| 2011 | "You Know the Night" | — | — | — | — | — | — | — | — | Note of Hope - A Celebration of Woody Guthrie (re-recorded for Standing in the Breach) |
| 2014 | "The Birds of St. Marks" | — | — | — | — | — | — | — | — | Standing in the Breach |
| 2019 | "A Human Touch" (with Leslie Mendelson) | — | — | — | — | — | — | — | — | Downhill from Everywhere |
| 2020 | "A Little Soon to Say" | — | — | — | — | — | — | — | — | Downhill from Everywhere |
| 2020 | "Downhill from Everywhere" | — | — | — | — | — | — | — | — | Downhill from Everywhere |
| 2021 | "My Cleveland Heart" | — | — | — | 18 | — | — | — | — | Downhill from Everywhere |
| 2022 | "Minutes to Downtown" | — | — | — | — | — | — | — | — | Downhill from Everywhere |
"—" denotes releases that did not chart

=== Guest singles ===
| Year | Single | Artist | Peak positions | | | | Album |
| Year | Single | Artist | US | US Rock | US AC | AU | Album |
|---|---|---|---|---|---|---|---|
| 1985 | "You're a Friend of Mine" | Clarence Clemons | 18 | 16 | 21 | 9 | Hero |

== Other appearances ==
=== Studio appearances ===
| Year | Song(s) | Album | Notes |
|---|---|---|---|
| 1982 | "Somebody's Baby" | Fast Times at Ridgemont High | original song |
| 1990 | "First Girl I Loved" | Rubáiyát: Elektra's 40th Anniversary | The Incredible String Band cover |
| 1991 | "Golden Slumbers" (with Jennifer Warnes) | For Our Children | The Beatles cover |
| 1995 | "Let It Be Me" | Bye Bye Love | Jill Corey and Jimmy Carroll cover |
| 1998 | "Kisses Sweeter than Wine" (with Bonnie Raitt) | Where Have All the Flowers Gone: The Songs of Pete Seeger – Volume 1 | The Weavers cover |
| 1998 | "I've Been the One" | Rock and Roll Doctor: A Tribute to Lowell George | Lowell George cover |
| 2001 | "Guantanamera"(with Joan Baez) | If I Had a Song: The Songs of Pete Seeger – Vol. 2 | Cuban folk song, arranged by Pete Seeger |
| 2004 | "Poor Poor Pitiful Me" (with Bonnie Raitt) | Enjoy Every Sandwich: The Songs of Warren Zevon | Warren Zevon cover |
| 2007 | "Oh My Love" | Instant Karma: The Amnesty International Campaign to Save Darfur | John Lennon cover |
| 2007 | "Across the Universe" (with Robby Krieger) | N/A | The Beatles cover, released as a single |
| 2009 | "Silver and Gold" (with Inara George) | Safety Harbor Kids Holiday Collection | initially released at Best Buy stores |
| 2011 | "True Love Ways" | Listen to Me: Buddy Holly | Buddy Holly cover |
| 2013 | "Don't Let Us Get Sick" | Sweet Relief III: Pennies from Heaven | Warren Zevon cover |
| 2024 | "Everywhere I Look" | Tonight I’ll Go Down Swingin’: A Tribute to Don Heffington | Don Heffington cover |

=== Live appearances ===
| 1980 | "The Crow On The Cradle" (with Graham Nash) "Before The Deluge" "Stay" (with Bruce Springsteen) | No Nukes: The Muse Concerts for a Non-Nuclear Future |
| 1996 | "Redemption Song" | The Concert for the Rock and Roll Hall of Fame |
| 2014 | "These Days" and "Melissa" (with Gregg Allman) | All My Friends: Celebrating The Songs & Voice of Gregg Allman |
| 2014 | "American Skin (41 Shots)" (with Tom Morello) | A MusiCares Tribute to Bruce Springsteen (DVD) |

=== Guest appearances ===
| Year | Song(s) | Album | Artist |
|---|---|---|---|
| 1985 | "You're a Friend of Mine" | Hero | Clarence Clemons |
| 1989 | various tracks | A Black & White Night Live | Roy Orbison |
| 2006 | various tracks | Some Bridges | Fred Martin & the Levite Camp |
| 2007 | "Best Friends" (with Vonda Harris) | Crazy Hair Day | Barry Saltzberg |
| 2010 | "Waterloo Sunset" | See My Friends | Ray Davies |
| 2010 | "The Pretender" | The 25th Anniversary Rock & Roll Hall of Fame Concerts | Crosby, Stills & Nash |
| 2015 | "Feels Like Home" | Strangers Again | Judy Collins |
| 2025 | "Dear Time" | Safe, Sensible and Sane | Alison Brown & Steve Martin |

=== Tribute albums ===
| Year | Album | Chart positions | Notes |
| Year | Album | US | Notes |
|---|---|---|---|
| 2014 | Looking Into You: A Tribute to Jackson Browne: Release: April 1, 2014; Label: Music Road Records; Format: CD | 44 | Album features various artists covering songs written by Browne |
