= The Very Best of Jackson Browne =

Greatest hits album by Jackson Browne
- Released: March 16, 2004
- Recorded: Disc 1: 1972-1977; Disc 2: 1977-2002
- Genre: Rock
- Length: Disc 1: 77:30; Disc 2: 78:16
- Label: Rhino/Elektra
- Producer: various

Jackson Browne chronology
The Naked Ride Home (2002)	The Very Best of Jackson Browne (2004)	Solo Acoustic, Vol. 1 (2005)

The Very Best of Jackson Browne is a double-disc compilation album by Jackson Browne, released on March 16, 2004, by Rhino Entertainment and Elektra Records in celebration of Browne's induction into the Rock and Roll Hall of Fame a day earlier. It reached number 46 on The Billboard 200.

== History ==
The previous Browne collection, 1997's The Next Voice You Hear: The Best of Jackson Browne was missing many songs considered essential by fans, such as "Rock Me On the Water" and "Lawyers in Love", as well as tracks from his 1989 album World in Motion. Thus, The Very Best of Jackson Browne is seen by many as the more complete of the two, although it lacks two of Browne's most successful singles, "For America" and "That Girl Could Sing".

Disc 1 encompasses the material from Browne's early career (1972–1977) and Disc 2 contains the material from his later years (1977–2002).

The album was certified as a Gold record in 2006 by the RIAA.

== Reception ==
Professional ratings
Review scores
Source	Rating
AllMusic	4.5/5 stars
The Encyclopedia of Popular Music	4/5 stars
Uncut	4/5 stars

AllMusic critic Stephen Thomas Erlewine praised the release, writing "the collection does contain the great majority of Browne's best and best-known material in an attractive, engaging fashion... and for listeners who want a comprehensive overview without purchasing individual albums, this suits the bill nicely."

Nigel Williamson of Uncut wrote "Browne's default mode has always been delicious melancholy, as this double-CD collection proves once again... for a one-stop career retrospective, this is hard to beat."

== Track listing ==
All songs by Jackson Browne unless otherwise noted

=== Disc one ===
1. "Doctor, My Eyes" – 3:20 (from the album Jackson Browne)
2. "Jamaica Say You Will" – 3:24 (from the album Jackson Browne)
3. "Rock Me on the Water" – 4:13 (from the album Jackson Browne)
4. "Take It Easy" (Browne, Glenn Frey) – 3:51 (from the album For Everyman)
5. "These Days" – 4:39 (from the album For Everyman)
6. "Redneck Friend" – 4:01 (from the album For Everyman)
7. "For Everyman" – 5:58 (from the album For Everyman)
8. "For a Dancer" – 4:45 (from the album Late for the Sky)
9. "Fountain of Sorrow" – 6:51 (from the album Late for the Sky)
10. "Late for the Sky" – 5:36 (from the album Late for the Sky)
11. "Before the Deluge" – 6:21 (from the album Late for the Sky)
12. "Your Bright Baby Blues" – 6:03 (from the album The Pretender)
13. "The Pretender" – 5:52 (from the album The Pretender)
14. "Here Come Those Tears Again" (Browne, Nancy Farnsworth) – 3:37 (from the album The Pretender)
15. "The Load-Out" (Browne, Bryan Garofalo) – 5:35 (from the album Running on Empty)
16. "Stay" (Maurice Williams) – 3:24 (from the album Running on Empty)

=== Disc two ===
1. "Running on Empty" – 4:59 (from the album Running on Empty)
2. "You Love the Thunder" – 3:55 (from the album Running on Empty)
3. "Boulevard" – 3:21 (from the album Hold Out)
4. "Somebody's Baby" (Browne, Danny Kortchmar) – 4:24 (from the soundtrack to Fast Times at Ridgemont High)
5. "Tender Is the Night" (Browne, Kortchmar, Russ Kunkel) – 4:53 (from the album Lawyers in Love)
6. "Lawyers in Love" – 4:20 (from the album Lawyers in Love)
7. "In the Shape of a Heart" – 5:47 (from the album Lives in the Balance)
8. "Lawless Avenues" (Browne, Jorge Calderón) – 5:39 (from the album Lives in the Balance)
9. "Lives in the Balance" – 4:15 (from the album Lives in the Balance)
10. "I Am a Patriot" (Steven Van Zandt) – 4:05 (from the album World in Motion)
11. "Sky Blue and Black" – 6:05 (from the album I'm Alive)
12. "I'm Alive" – 5:10 (from the album I'm Alive)
13. "The Barricades of Heaven" (Browne, Luis Conte, Mark Goldenberg, Mauricio Lewak, Kevin McCormick, Scott Thurston, Jeff Young) – 5:40 (from the album Looking East)
14. "Looking East" (Browne, Conte, Goldenberg, Lewak, McCormick, Thurston, Jeff Young) – 4:56 (from the album Looking East)
15. "The Naked Ride Home" – 5:58 (from the album The Naked Ride Home)
16. "The Night Inside Me" (Browne, Goldenberg, Lewak, McCormick, Young) – 4:39 (from the album The Naked Ride Home)

== Production ==
Compilation produced by Jackson Browne.

All original recordings produced by Jackson Browne except for those from Jackson Browne, The Pretender and Looking East. Some albums were co-produced:

- Richard Sanford Orshoff (Jackson Browne)
- Al Schmitt (Late for the Sky)
- Jon Landau (The Pretender)
- Greg Ladanyi (Hold Out and Lawyers in Love)
- Scott Thurston (World in Motion, I'm Alive, and Looking East)
- Kevin McCormick (Looking East and The Naked Ride Home)

== Charts ==
Chart (2004)	Peak position
US Billboard 200	46

== Certifications ==
Region	Certification	Certified units/sales
United Kingdom (BPI)	Gold	100,000^{‡}
United States (RIAA)	Gold	500,000^{^}
^{^} Shipments figures based on certification alone.^{‡} Sales+streaming figures based on certification alone.
