= The Next Voice You Hear: The Best of Jackson Browne =

Greatest hits album by Jackson Browne
- Released: September 23, 1997
- Genre: Rock
- Label: Elektra
- Producer: various

Jackson Browne chronology
| Looking East (1996) | The Next Voice You Hear: The Best of Jackson Browne (1997) | The Naked Ride Home (2002) |

Singles from The Next Voice You Hear: The Best of Jackson Browne
- 1. "The Next Voice You Hear" Released: 1997; 2. "The Rebel Jesus" Released: 1997

The Next Voice You Hear: The Best of Jackson Browne is a greatest hits album by the singer-songwriter Jackson Browne released in 1997.

== History ==
The compilation album includes songs from his early years as well as the later ones, plus two new songs: "The Rebel Jesus" and "The Next Voice You Hear"; however, it does not include any songs from Browne's 1989 album World in Motion. The Next Voice You Hear was superseded by 2004's more comprehensive compilation The Very Best of Jackson Browne.

The album was certified as a gold record in 2002 and platinum in 2004 by the RIAA.

The album was certified gold in Australia in 2003.

== Reception ==
Professional ratings
Review scores
| Source | Rating |
|---|---|
| Allmusic | 3/5 stars |
| Uncut | 2/5 stars |

Referring to the 1997 Japanese release, Allmusic critic Stephen Thomas Erlewine noted the difficulty of picking tracks for the release and summarized: "there are still a number of equally good, if not better, cuts that are left off. As a result, The Next Voice You Hear is merely adequate for casual Browne fans, but it's nowhere near definitive."

== Track listing ==
All songs by Jackson Browne unless otherwise noted.

| No. | Title | Writer(s) | Original album | Length |
|---|---|---|---|---|
| 1. | "Doctor My Eyes" | | Jackson Browne (1972) | 3:20 |
| 2. | "These Days" | | For Everyman (1973) | 4:40 |
| 3. | "Fountain of Sorrow" | | Late for the Sky (1974) | 6:53 |
| 4. | "Late for the Sky" | | Late for the Sky | 5:38 |
| 5. | "The Pretender" | | The Pretender (1976) | 5:53 |
| 6. | "Running on Empty" (single mix) | | Running on Empty (1977) | 4:56 |
| 7. | "Call It a Loan" | Browne, David Lindley | Hold Out (1980) | 4:48 |
| 8. | "Somebody's Baby" (extended mix) | Browne, Danny Kortchmar | Fast Times at Ridgemont High (1982) | 4:22 |
| 9. | "Tender Is the Night" | Browne, Kortchmar, Russ Kunkel | Lawyers in Love (1983) | 4:54 |
| 10. | "In the Shape of a Heart" (alternate mix) | | Lives in the Balance (1986) | 5:42 |
| 11. | "Lives in the Balance" | | Lives in the Balance | 4:16 |
| 12. | "Sky Blue and Black" | | I'm Alive (1993) | 6:07 |
| 13. | "The Barricades of Heaven" | Browne, Luis Conte, Mark Goldenberg, Mauricio Lewak, Kevin McCormick, Scott Thurston, Jeff Young | Looking East (1996) | 5:43 |
| 14. | "The Rebel Jesus" | | | 4:39 |
| 15. | "The Next Voice You Hear" | | | 4:49 |

== Certifications ==
| Region | Certification | Certified units/sales |
|---|---|---|
| Australia (ARIA) | Gold | 35,000^{^} |
| United States (RIAA) | Platinum | 1,000,000^{^} |
^{^} Shipments figures based on certification alone.
