= Looking Into You: A Tribute to Jackson Browne =

2014 compilation album by various artists

Compilation album by Various Artists
- Released: April 1, 2014
- Genre: Rock, folk music
- Label: Music Road Records

Looking Into You: A Tribute to Jackson Browne is a tribute album to Jackson Browne that features various artists covering songs written by Browne. It was released on April 1, 2014 through Music Road Records and debuted at No. 44 on the Billboard 200 chart, selling 8,000 copies in its first week.

== Critical reception ==
Professional ratings
Aggregate scores
Source	Rating
Metacritic	68/100
Review scores
Source	Rating
Rolling Stone	3/5 stars
Allmusic	3.5/5 stars
PopMatters	7/10 discs

Looking Into You: A Tribute to Jackson Browne received mostly positive reviews from music critics upon its release. At Metacritic, which assigns a normalized rating out of 100 to reviews from mainstream critics, the album has received an average score of 68, based on 10 reviews, indicating "generally favorable" feedback. Rolling Stone's Will Hermes gave the album three out of five stars, stating: "Not every performance is memorable, and the absence of younger fans is a missed opportunity – where's Conor Oberst? But the way that Browne's songs braid verbose emotions with melody remains magical." Allmusic's Stephen Thomas Erlewine gave the album a positive review, stating that "on a track-by-track basis this collection is very good" and "if there are no knockouts here, the sly, subtle approach also emphasizes the fine craft of Browne, which is a nice thing to say about a tribute album."

== Track listing ==
All songs written by Jackson Browne, except where noted.

=== Disc one ===
1. "These Days" – Don Henley with Blind Pilot – 3:35
2. "Everywhere I Go" – Bonnie Raitt and David Lindley – 4:59
3. "Running on Empty" – Bob Schneider – 4:54
4. "Fountain of Sorrow" – Indigo Girls – 7:47
5. "Doctor My Eyes" – Paul Thorn – 3:29
6. "For Everyman" – Jimmy LaFave – 6:53
7. "The Barricades of Heaven" (Browne, Jeff Young, Kevin McCormick, Scott Thurston, Mark Goldenberg, Mauricio Lewak, Luis Conte) – Griffin House – 6:00
8. "Our Lady of the Well" – Lyle Lovett – 3:53
9. "Jamaica Say You Will" – Ben Harper – 3:22
10. "Before the Deluge" – Eliza Gilkyson – 5:58
11. "For a Dancer" – Venice – 4:45
12. "Looking into You" – Kevin Welch – 5:41

=== Disc two ===
1. "Rock Me on the Water" – Keb' Mo' – 4:15
2. "The Pretender" – Lucinda Williams – 6:55
3. "Rosie" (Browne, Donald Miller) – Lyle Lovett – 3:43
4. "Something Fine" – Karla Bonoff – 4:37
5. "Too Many Angels" – Marc Cohn feat. Joan As Police Woman – 4:45
6. "Your Bright Baby Blues" – Sean and Sara Watkins – 6:37
7. "Linda Paloma" – Bruce Springsteen and Patti Scialfa – 3:46
8. "Call It a Loan" (Browne, Lindley) – Shawn Colvin – 4:28
9. "I'm Alive" – Bruce Hornsby – 4:05
10. "Late For the Sky" – Joan Osborne – 5:17
11. "My Opening Farewell" – JD Souther – 4:54
