= The Next Voice You Hear =

The Next Voice You Hear may refer to:

- The Next Voice You Hear..., a 1950 drama film
- The Next Voice You Hear: The Best of Jackson Browne, an album by Jackson Browne
