= These Days (Jackson Browne song) =

Song by Jackson Browne

Song by Jackson Browne

from the album For Everyman
- Released: 1973
- Studio: The Sound Factory, Los Angeles, California
- Genre: Rock
- Length: 4:41
- Label: Asylum
- Songwriter: Jackson Browne
- Producer: Jackson Browne

"These Days" is a song written by Jackson Browne and recorded by numerous artists. Browne wrote the song at age 16; its lyrics deal with loss and regret. It was first recorded by Nico in 1967 for her album Chelsea Girl, and Nico's arrangement was recorded by several other artists. Tom Rush recorded the song with a string arrangement for his album Tom Rush in 1970. Gregg Allman recorded a new arrangement of the song for his 1973 LP Laid Back, and Browne released his own version, based on Allman's arrangement, on For Everyman, also in 1973. "These Days" has since been recorded by many other artists, and remains one of Browne's most enduring compositions.

According to Randall Roberts at the Los Angeles Times, the song has "quietly become a classic" over the years, while The New York Times's Bob Mehr called it "a remarkably durable composition". Pitchfork Media's 2006 ranking of "The 200 Greatest Songs of the 1960s" placed the Nico version of "These Days" at number 31.

== Origins and Nico version ==
"These Days"

Song by Nico

from the album Chelsea Girl
- Released: October 1967
- Genre: Folk-pop; chamber folk; baroque pop
- Length: 3:30
- Label: Verve
- Songwriter: Jackson Browne
- Producer: Tom Wilson

In the mid- to late 1960s, Jackson Browne, a prolific songwriter, was pitching his material to artists and publishing houses. On January 7, 1967, he made some demo recordings for Nina Music Publishing at Jaycino Studio in New York City. Nina collected these songs on a double album which was given to various artists and managers in the hope that other artists would choose to record one. Included in these demos, and the third song on this collection, was "I've Been Out Walking", an early version of "These Days". Yet the song was even older than that. Browne later said he wrote it when he was 16 years old, meaning in 1964 or 1965.

German model and singer Nico was the first to record "These Days" for release on her October 1967 album Chelsea Girl. The elaborate production featured a fairly fast fingerpicking electric guitar part by Browne, played in a descending pattern ending in a major 7th chord. The use of the instrument was suggested by artist and impresario Andy Warhol, Nico's manager at the time, who was looking for something more "modern" than the acoustic guitar on the songwriter's demo recording. This was combined with overdubbed strings and flutes, added after the fact by producer Tom Wilson without Nico's knowledge. Set against these elements were the sad, world-weary lyrics, in Nico's mannered, German-accented, lower-register vocals:

I've been out walking
I don't do too much talking, these days –
These days ... These days I seem to think a lot,
About the things that I forgot to do
And all the times I had the chance to

Nico disliked the strings and called the album "unlistenable" as a result. But nevertheless, the "ineffable sadness" and "grandeur of her melancholy" came through, according to Pitchfork.

"These Days" was recorded in 1968 by The Nitty Gritty Dirt Band on their album Rare Junk, by Tom Rush on his 1970 self-titled album, by Jennifer Warnes (as "Jennifer") on her 1972 album Jennifer (this version was produced by John Cale, who also played on Nico's Chelsea Girl album), by Kenny Loggins' first band, Gator Creek, around the same time, and by Iain Matthews on his 1973 album Valley Hi.

== Browne and Allman versions ==
"These Days"

Song by Gregg Allman

from the album Laid Back
- Released: October 1973
- Genre: Country folk
- Length: 3:56
- Label: Capricorn
- Songwriter: Jackson Browne
- Producers: Johnny Sandlin; Gregg Allman

By 1973, Jackson Browne had become a successful recording artist, and not having raided his back catalogue for the first album Jackson Browne, was willing to do so for his second, For Everyman. Recorded at the Sunset Sound Factory, the song had evolved considerably from the version Nico had recorded in 1967. Some lyrics were changed or omitted, such as a couple of lines about "rambling" and "gambling". The fingerpicking guitar figure was replaced with flatpicking, and the slower-paced instrumentation was typical of early 1970s Southern Californian folk rock — drums, bass, piano, acoustic guitar, but most prominently with David Lindley's slide guitar, a feature of Browne's early albums, but also with Jim Keltner on drums and David Paich on piano. Nico's cool delivery was replaced by Browne's singer-songwriter-style approach, resulting in a vocal that Philadelphia City Paper later called "unique, and piercingly sad". The version was recorded at around the same time as a version by Gregg Allman, which Jackson thanked in his liner notes in For Everyman; Browne based the musical arrangement of his 1973 recording partly on Allman's version; the two versions were released within days of each other in October 1973. Allman's version would appear on his debut solo album, Laid Back (and following by a year or two the loss of The Allman Brothers Band bandmates Duane Allman and Berry Oakley in motorcycle accidents).

Ultimate Classic Rock critic Michael Gallucci rated it as Browne's 5th greatest song, saying that "it's Browne's sad, plaintive take on the song...that nails the melancholic tone of the lyrics."

Glide critic Lee Zimmerman rated it as one of 10 Jackson Browne songs that should have been a hit, calling it "a tender tune written by a remarkably young man at the early stages of his career" and saying that "the remorse and regret belie the fact that his life experiences had barely even begun."

While Allman was most associated with the emerging Southern rock scene, he had spent considerable time in Los Angeles before The Allman Brothers Band came together; he and Browne had become friends, and he had recorded the Browne composition "Cast Off All My Fears" on the album The Hour Glass, the self-title debut of his band at that time. Allman's version of "These Days" kept to Browne's revised lyric until the end, when he changed "Don't confront me with my failures / I had not forgotten them," to "Please don't confront me with my failures / I'm aware of them." Rolling Stone praised the treatment, saying Allman "does full justice to the quietly hurting lyrics, double-tracking the vocal over a sad steel guitar," and calling the vocal quality "resigned" and "eternally aching." In 1999, writer Anthony DeCurtis called Allman's version "definitive", and in 2012, American Songwriter magazine said that Allman's recording had overshadowed Browne's in the same way that the Eagles had for Browne's co-written "Take It Easy".

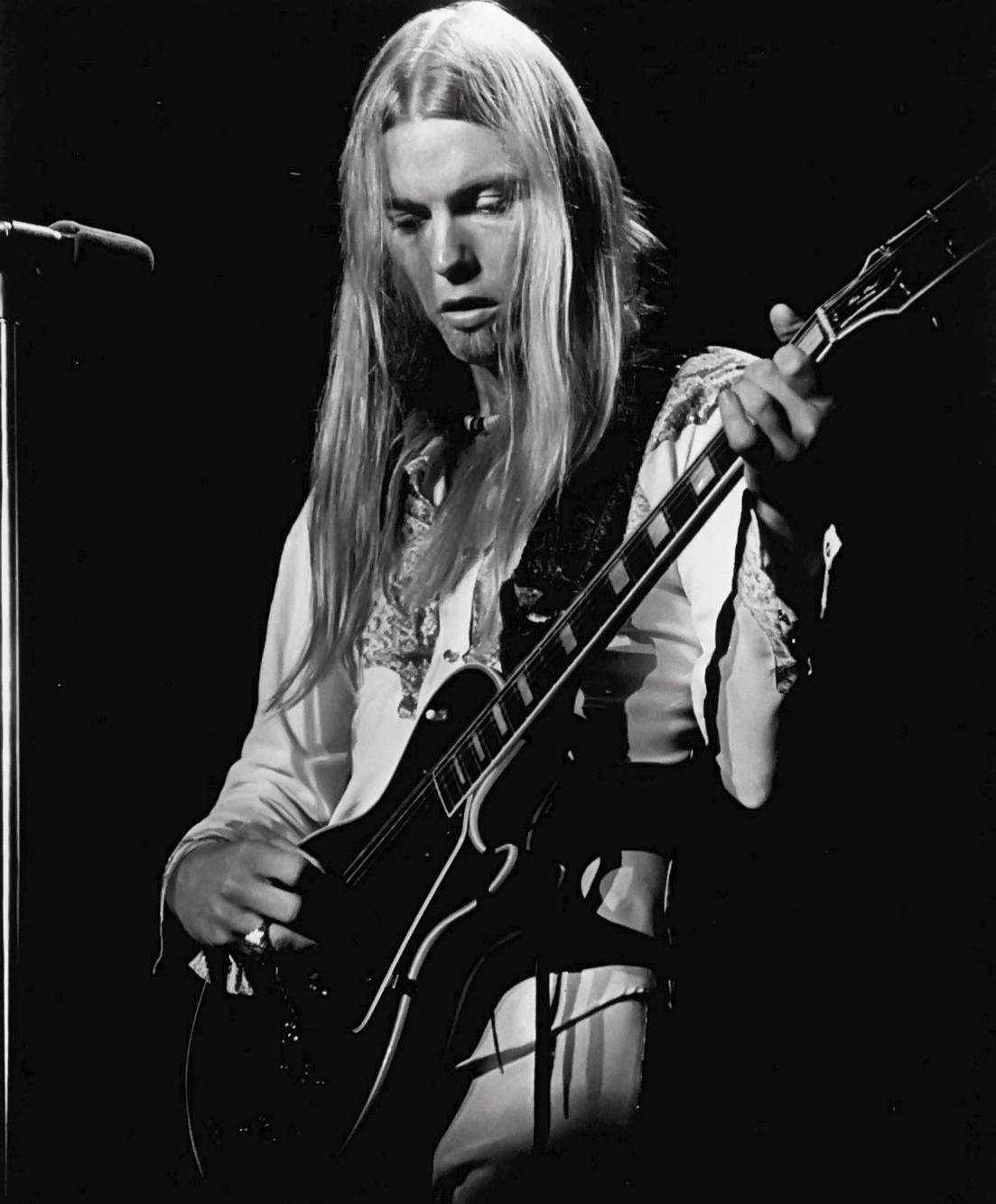
Anthony DeCurtis at Rolling Stone called Gregg Allman's rendition of the song "definitive"

Many years later, Browne described the inspiration he credited: "When [Allman] did it I thought that he really unlocked a power in that song that I sort of then emulated in my version. I started playing the piano. I wasn't trying to sing it like Gregg; I couldn't possibly. I took the cue, playin' this slow walk. But it was written very sort of, kind of — [strums opening] — a little more flatpicking."

While neither version was released as a single, both Browne's and Allman's "These Days" recordings gained airplay on progressive rock radio stations and became the most-heard interpretations of the song. The song was included on both of Browne's "best of" albums, The Next Voice You Hear: The Best of Jackson Browne and The Very Best of Jackson Browne, and on both of Allman's compilations, The Millennium Collection: The Best of Gregg Allman and (in a live version) No Stranger to the Dark: The Best of Gregg Allman.

When Allman toured as a solo act, he generally kept "These Days" in his concert repertoire. Browne was a different story. It had appeared in his concerts since before he had a recording contract, and stayed in through the 1970s, usually played on piano in a surprising segue out of his biggest hit single, "Doctor My Eyes". But by 1980 he had graduated from halls and outdoor amphitheatres to arenas, and "These Days" disappeared from his set lists, perhaps because he felt it no longer effective in those settings. Save for the occasional acoustic show or benefit show, the song was not heard again until the late 1990s, as Browne was again playing smaller venues, often solo, and where it began to reappear out of the "Doctor My Eyes" segue again.

== Renewed visibility ==
"These Days" gained renewed visibility when the Nico recording was included in a scene in the 2001 Wes Anderson film The Royal Tenenbaums, which grossed over $50 million in the U.S. and garnered many award nominations. The Philadelphia City Paper wrote that "It's no surprise that Wes Anderson used this recording in The Royal Tenenbaums; the fear of missed opportunity that its characters share is what propels 'These Days'." The scene in which Margot Tenenbaum (Gwyneth Paltrow) gets out of a Green Line bus as the song is heard was one of the first that Anderson designed for the film. Jackson Browne later said "I forgot that I'd licensed them to use this song. And this is one of those things that comes to you in the mail and you don't know what they're talking about and you simply give them their permission. You're sitting in the movie theater and there's this great moment when Gwyneth Paltrow is coming out of a bus or something like that. I'm thinking to myself, I used to play the guitar just like that. And then the voice comes on and it's Nico singing 'These Days', which I played on."

Nico's "These Days" was included on both versions of The Royal Tenenbaums soundtrack. Later, a 2002 Kmart commercial looped the guitar part from the Nico recording. There was a new wave of treatments of the song, with some emulating either Nico or Browne while others reimagined it in other ways.

Nico's version later became a popular sound on the mobile app TikTok.

Given this new attention, Browne began playing "These Days" in concert on a regular basis, but on acoustic guitar and in a new style. He now started with the fingerpicking guitar part but continued in a technique and feel that falls between the Nico and Browne recordings. He said "And now I've learned how to play the Nico version, which we sort of made up for her. [Imitates Nico's version] Fabulous you know..." It was included on Browne's 2005 live album Solo Acoustic, Vol. 1, including a humorous spoken introduction about the origins of the song. Another arrangement was constructed for his 2006 tour of Spain with David Lindley and percussionist Tino di Geraldo and captured on the 2010 live album Love Is Strange: En Vivo Con Tino. A Spanish-accented vocal from guest singer Luz Casal was set against Browne's acoustic guitar, Lindley's violin, and di Geraldo's cajón; AllMusic stated that the result "makes an already beautiful song exquisite".

The Allman Brothers Band included the song for the first time in their concerts, featuring it on their March 2005 Beacon Theatre run of shows with Gregg Allman and Warren Haynes both playing acoustic guitar and sharing dual vocals.

Browne and Allman sang "These Days" together on January 10, 2014, at Atlanta's Fox Theatre at the All My Friends: Celebrating The Songs & Voice of Gregg Allman tribute concert and subsequent CD and DVD release. The pair followed with a duet of Allman's classic "Melissa."

On October 9, 2014, Browne joined Blake Mills onstage at the World Cafe in Philadelphia to perform "These Days." The two were joined by Mills' tour band as well as his opener, yMusic. Mills admitted to having played the song at his high school graduation, citing Browne as an early influence and now-frequent collaborator.

== Post-1973 versions ==
- Iain Matthews included the song on his 1973 solo album Valley Hi.
- Terry Melcher with Doris Day included "These Days" on his 1974 album Terry Melcher.
- New Grass Revival recorded the song in a progressive bluegrass style for their 1975 album Fly Through the Country.
- Cher recorded the song for her 1975 album Stars.
- Kate Wolf recorded the song, live in June 1979. Nina Gerber accompanied her on guitar. It was released posthumously on Looking Back at You in 1994.
- Indie rocker Barbara Manning included it as the B-side of one of her singles in 1989.
- 10,000 Maniacs covered the song for the 1990 Elektra Records tribute album Rubáiyát.
- The Golden Palominos on their 1993 album This Is How It Feels.
- The Nectarine No. 9 recorded the song on the 1995 album Niagara Falls.
- Lloyd Cole played the song live in the 1990s.
- Elliott Smith was known to cover the song frequently in live performances (most likely in the late 1990s).
- Fountains of Wayne used it as the B-side of their 1999 single "Troubled Times", and later included it on disc 2 of the band's 2005 compilation album Out-of-State Plates.
- Mates of State recorded it as a 7" inch single in 2002
- Paul Westerberg covered the song on his 2003 album Come Feel Me Tremble.
- Philadelphia singer-songwriter Denison Witmer included the song on his 2003 covers album Recovered.
- Alternative folk singer Kathryn Williams included a cover of "These Days" on her 2004 covers album Relations.
- St. Vincent covered the song on the 2006 EP Paris Is Burning.
- Southampton band Delays included a cover of the song on their 2008 EP Lost Tunes.
- Glen Campbell covered the song on his 2008 album Meet Glen Campbell.
- Band of Horses guitarist Tyler Ramsey covered the song on his 2008 solo album A Long Dream About Swimming Across the Sea.
- Irish singer Gemma Hayes recorded the track on her 2009 Oliver EP.
- Fightstar covered the song acoustically as a B-side to the digital download of their 2009 single "Never Change".
- The Tallest Man on Earth covered the song in 2009 for a Take-Away Show video.
- Robin Pecknold and Alela Diane covered the song at a live concert in 2011.
- Don Henley with Blind Pilot recorded the song for the 2014 Looking Into You: A Tribute to Jackson Browne album.
- Live in 1990 in a duet between Gregg Allman and Graham Nash.
- Johnny Darrell recorded the song for the 1970 album The California Stop-Over, and it was included on the 2002 album The Complete Gusto/Starday/King Recordings.
- Drake and Babeo Baggins of rap collective Barf Troop covered the song in 2016.
- Swing Out Sister covered the song in a live limited edition recording, Les Chants de Manchester released in 2016 (recorded October 14, 2011, by Robin Macmillan at Lowry Gallery in Salford).
- Yeule recorded a cover version and released it as a digital single in 2019.
- Young@Heart Chorus recorded it on their album Now.
- Everything But The Girl recorded a cover version and released it on Missing - The Live EP.
- Miley Cyrus covered the song for MTV Unplugged Presents Miley Cyrus Backyard Sessions in 2020.
- Cat Power recorded a cover version in her 2022 album Covers.
- Phoebe Bridgers, Lucy Dacus, Weyes Blood, Matty Healy, Jack Antonoff and Trey Anastasio performed a cover for the 8th Annual Talent Show for The Ally Coalition
- Daryl Braithwaite and Dale Kruse covered the song on Braithwaite's album The Lemon Tree in 2008.
- The Anchoress covered the song on her album Versions in 2023.
- Margaret Glaspy covered the song on her 2025 album The Golden Heart Protector.

== Soundtrack appearances ==
The best-known soundtrack usage of "These Days" was in the 2001 film The Royal Tenenbaums. Other soundtrack appearances include:

- The 2002 cover version by indie rock band Mates of State appeared in the 2004 Wicker Park soundtrack.
- A cover version by Griffin House was played on the Everwood television series and its 2004 soundtrack album.
- Browne's 1973 recording appeared in the 2006 film Invincible.
- Jen Stills' version was featured in "Nearlyweds", a 2009 episode of the television series Brothers & Sisters.
- Alt-J and Mountain Man's song "Buffalo" featured on the Silver Linings Playbook soundtrack uses the first lines of "These Days" at the end of their song.
- Taylor Goldsmith of the band Dawes covered the song for a 2017 episode "Number One" of the TV show This Is Us. Goldsmith is married to series co-star Mandy Moore and has collaborated with Browne in the past.
- Browne's recording was also featured on Billions, season 4, episode 10 "New Year's Day" and on the Netflix series After Life, season 2, episode 1.
- Anika and Jim Jarmusch covered the song in two versions for the film Father, Mother, Sister, Brother in 2025
