= The Naked Ride Home =

Studio album by Jackson Browne
- Released: September 24, 2002
- Recorded: 2001
- Studio: Groove Masters, Santa Monica
- Genre: Rock
- Length: 59:47
- Label: Elektra
- Producer: Jackson Browne, Kevin McCormick

Jackson Browne chronology
The Next Voice You Hear: The Best of Jackson Browne (1997)	The Naked Ride Home (2002)	The Very Best of Jackson Browne (2004)

Singles from The Naked Ride Home
- 1. "The Night Inside Me" Released: 2002; 2. "About My Imagination" Released: 2003

The Naked Ride Home is the twelfth album by American singer-songwriter Jackson Browne, released in 2002 (see 2002 in music). It peaked at number 36 on The Billboard 200 chart. The single "The Night Inside Me" reached number 25 on the Adult Contemporary chart.

As of February 2004 the album had sold 139,000 copies in United States according to Nielsen Soundscan.

Guests included Keb' Mo' and Greg Leisz.

== Reception ==
Professional ratings
Review scores
Source	Rating
AllMusic	3/5 stars
The Encyclopedia of Popular Music	3/5 stars
Rolling Stone	4/5 stars

Mark Deming, writing for AllMusic, remarked that "the craft of Browne's songwriting is still strong, and his performances are pin-sharp and passionate, but unfortunately the very real strengths of The Naked Ride Home only make its flaws all the more glaring – namely, that Browne's muse hasn't taken him anyplace new and interesting in some time, and even though it's clear he still takes the arts of songwriting and recording very seriously, the results lack the depth or the impact of his earlier work."

James Hunter, writing for Rolling Stone, felt that the album delivered "a varied midtempo dependability that turns richer and more resonant upon re-listenings," and that it was "looser, warmer and more live-sounding than Browne's recent work – yet still as passionately crafted and sung ... he is the sound of unfrantic L.A. cool engaged with the long view."

== Track listing ==
All songs written by Jackson Browne, Mark Goldenberg, Mauricio Lewak, Kevin McCormick and Jeff Young, except where noted:

1. "The Naked Ride Home" (Browne) – 5:56
2. "The Night Inside Me" – 4:38
3. "Casino Nation" – 6:57
4. "For Taking the Trouble" (Browne) – 4:25
5. "Never Stop" – 4:56
6. "Walking Town" – 6:20
7. "About My Imagination" – 6:10
8. "Sergio Leone" – 7:57
9. "Don't You Want to Be There" (Browne) – 7:35
10. "My Stunning Mystery Companion" (Browne) – 4:53

== Personnel ==
- Jackson Browne – lead vocals, acoustic piano, Fender Rhodes, acoustic guitar, electric guitar
- Jeff Scott Young – acoustic piano, Wurlitzer electric piano, Hammond organ, synthesizers, harmony vocals
- Mark Goldenberg – electric guitar, hi-string guitar (4)
- Greg Leisz – acoustic guitar (1), 12-string electric guitar (1)
- Kevin Moore (Keb' Mo') – slide guitar (4)
- Val McCallum – rhythm acoustic guitar (7)
- Kevin McCormick – bass guitar, rhythm electric guitar (7)
- Mauricio "Fritz" Lewak – drums, cajón (4)
- Luis Conte – percussion
- Fernando Pullam – trumpet (9)
- Jennifer Gross – harmony vocals (3, 6)
- Kipp Lennon – harmony vocals (3, 6)
- Alethea Mills – harmony vocals (4), choir vocals (9)
- Chavonne Morris – harmony vocals (4), choir vocals (9)
- Jimmy Burney – choir vocals (9)
- Marc Cohn – harmony vocals (9)
- Fred Martin – choir arrangements (9)

== Production ==
- Producers – Jackson Browne and Kevin McCormick
- Engineer – Paul Dieter
- Assistant Engineers – Sebastian Haimerl, Mark Johnson, Bil Lane and Rich Tosi.
- Mixing – Bob Clearmountain
- Mix Assistant – Kevin Harp
- Mastered by Bob Ludwig at Gateway Mastering (Portland, ME).
- Technical Director – Ed Wong
- Artwork – Dustin Stanton
- Cover Photo – Nels Israelson
- Booklet Photos – Dianna Cohen and Nels Israelson

== Charts ==
Album – Billboard (United States)

Year	Chart	Position
2002	The Billboard 200	36
2002	Top Internet Albums	36

Singles – Billboard (United States)

Year	Single	Chart	Position
2002	"The Night Inside Me"	Adult Contemporary	25
