= Late for the Sky (song) =

1974 song written and performed by Jackson Browne

Song by Jackson Browne

from the album Late for the Sky
- Language: English
- Released: September 13, 1974
- Recorded: 1974
- Genre: Soft rock
- Length: 5:36
- Label: Asylum
- Songwriter: Jackson Browne
- Producers: Jackson Browne, Al Schmitt

"Late for the Sky" is a song written by Jackson Browne. It is the opening track and title track from Browne's 1974 album Late for the Sky.

== Lyrics and music ==
Will Hodgkinson of The Times described the song as a Seventies soft rock favourite. AllMusic critic William Ruhlmann describes "Late for the Sky" as a "slow, piano-based ballad in [Browne's] familiar style" that is "a typically eloquent description of romantic discord." Ultimate Classic Rock critic Michael Gallucci says that while the album plays like "one long breakup montage" the title track is key to the story, telling of "the moment where that tiny glimmer of hope is wiped out by cold, hard reality." Browne biographer Mark Bego said that it "sets the tone" for the rest of the album.

The lyrics tell of a relationship that is doomed to fail because the singer's lover's expectations of him are too great. Rolling Stone critic Stephen Holden said that it "explores an affair at its nadir." The song starts by describing an argument in which the singer and his lover discuss their relationship from when it began until he realizes that now when he looks at her he sees "nobody I'd ever known." In the second verse the singer acknowledges that "for me some words come easy/But I know that they don't mean that much/Compared with the things that are said when lovers touch." In the bridge the singer notes that he has been fooling himself by imagining that he could be the one who his lover needs.

The song ends with a restatement of the bridge in which the singer states that he is rushing to catch an early flight because he is "late for the sky." According to Browne biographer Rich Wiseman, "the sky serves as the album's most striking symbol of death/salvation." Holden similarly stated that the sky is "the album’s symbol for escape, salvation and death."

Both Bego and Wiseman have suggested that the song is about Browne's relationship with singer Joni Mitchell.

Bego describes the music as being "slow and somber". Music critic Jon Landau said that the song "begins with some instrumental meandering that may, at first, seem pointless" but the song "gathers momentum" so that by the chorus "the music has suddenly and surprisingly become compelling." The song has an unusual structure, in which there are two statements of the verse and chorus, followed by the bridge, and then another statement of the chorus before ending with a version of the bridge.

Browne praised the harmony vocals provided by Doug Haywood. According to Browne:

It has this great harmony part by Doug Haywood that really makes the song. Doug, Don Henley, JD Souther, Dan Fogelberg and I were really the best of friends back in the '70s. Everybody has that group of friends in their life at the time they come of age, and these were mine. I had some of the most hilarious times standing around the mike with them. I'm not a very exacting harmony singer and certainly was less so then, so when we did harmonies they'd have to send me on some errand just so they could get it done. "Hey, yeah, Jackson, know what? I left something in my car, would you mind going and grabbing it?" I'd come back and the part would be finished.

== Personnel ==
Credits are adapted from the liner notes of The Very Best of Jackson Browne.

- Jackson Browne – lead vocals, piano, acoustic guitar
- Doug Haywood – bass guitar, harmony vocals
- David Lindley – electric guitar
- Jai Winding – Hammond organ
- Larry Zack – drums

== Reception ==
Los Angeles Times critic Robert Hilburn said that "Late for the Sky" was "perhaps the album's best designed work", describing its theme as "the agony of discovering the reality of an incomplete relationship." Gallucci rated "Late for the Sky" as Browne's 6th greatest song. Classic Rock History critic Brian Kachejian rated it as Browne's 9th greatest song.

== Other appearances ==
Despite not being released as a single, "Late for the Sky" was included on Browne's compilation albums The Next Voice You Hear: The Best of Jackson Browne in 1997 and The Very Best of Jackson Browne in 2004.

The song was used in Martin Scorsese's 1976 film, Taxi Driver, in a scene where Robert De Niro's character Travis Bickle "loses what's left of his loose grip on reality."
