= Bob Seidemann =

American photographer

Robert Emett Seidemann (December 28, 1941 – November 27, 2017) was an American graphic artist and photographer. He was known for his portraits of musicians and bands from San Francisco's counterculture in the 1960s and 1970s. Many of his images were published by Rolling Stone, by record labels, and in books.

== Biography ==
Seidemann was born on December 28, 1941, in Manhattan, New York. He grew up in Queens. Seidemann graduated from Manhattan High School of Aviation Trades, and apprenticed with photographer Tom Caravaglia in Manhattan before heading west.

=== 1960s ===
In San Francisco, he found friends among the artists in the North Beach neighborhood and environs and began working as an artist himself. He collaborated with friends David Getz, Rick Griffin, Stanley Mouse and Alton Kelly, Big Brother and the Holding Company, George Hunter, The Charlatans, Janis Joplin and the Grateful Dead to create photographic images at the forefront of the popular and revolutionary culture of the time.

In 1969, Eric Clapton formed a new band and Seidemann was commissioned to create the cover for their album. Seidemann photographed nude 11-year-old Mariora Goschen to create what would become his most famous and controversial work, titled "Blind Faith". Not only did it become the cover and title of Blind Faith the album, but the name of the band as well.

=== 1970s ===
Although unpublished until her death in 1970, Seidemann's 1967 portraits of a semi-nude Janis Joplin earned him wide acclaim. Seidemann also photographed the Grateful Dead a number of times during their peak, both for posters and album liners, as well as designing the covers for Jerry Garcia's debut solo album, Garcia, and the Grateful Dead's Wake of the Flood with Rick Griffin illustrating.

His work was included in the Annie Leibovitz edited book, Shooting Stars: the Rolling Stones Book of Portraits (Straight Arrow Press, 1973), alongside photographers Herb Greene, Jim Marshall, Baron Wolman, Annie Leibovitz, Nevis Cameron, Ed Caraeff, David Gahr, Barry Feinstein, Ethan Russell, and others.

From 1974 till 1984 Seidemann produced more than 60 record album covers in Los Angeles, among them Jackson Browne's Late for the Sky and Neil Young's On the Beach. His cover photo for the 1978 Bob Seger album Stranger in Town, shot in the Hollywood Hills, became an iconic Seger photo.

=== 1980s to present ===
From the late 1980s till 2000, Seidemann produced a portfolio of 302 aviation-themed photographs entitled "Airplane as Art". Striking abstract photographs of all manner of aircraft and environmental portraits of aircraft engineers, designers, and pilots make up the collection. “Airplane As Art” is in included in the Getty Museum Photography Collection, Smithsonian National Air and Space Museum, McDermott Library, UTDallas, and the Boeing Corporate Collection.

A portfolio sold at Sotheby's on October 12, 2000, for $236,750. His 1969 "Blind Faith" flush-mounted and signed chromogenic photo print, edition (17/30), sold at Sotheby's New York on June 24, 2014 (lot 20), at $17,500 (with buyer's premium).
