= Gracias a la Vida (album) =

Studio album by Joan Baez
- Released: April 1974
- Recorded: Early 1974
- Studio: A&M (Hollywood)
- Genre: Latin, folk
- Length: 43:18
- Language: Spanish and Catalan
- Label: A&M
- Producer: Joan Baez, Henry Lewy

Joan Baez chronology
Where Are You Now, My Son? (1973)	Gracias a la Vida (1974)	Diamonds & Rust (1975)

Gracias a la Vida (subtitled Joan Baez canta en español), or Here's to Life: Joan Baez sings in Spanish is the fifteenth studio album (and seventeenth overall) by American singer-songwriter Joan Baez, released in 1974. It was performed mainly in Spanish, with one song in Catalan.

Baez stated at the time that she released the album as a "message of hope to the Chileans suffering under Augusto Pinochet", in the wake of the death of Salvador Allende. (Baez is known for her criticism of US foreign policy in Latin America, and has toured and worked on behalf of improving human rights in the region). Songs include selections by Chilean composers Víctor Jara (who was tortured and killed in the aftermath of the 1973 coup d'état) and Violeta Parra, who composed the title song.

A more upbeat version of "Dida" appears on Baez's Diamonds & Rust, released the following year.

Countries represented in the track listing range from Mexico and Cuba to Chile and Spain. The album was moderately successful in the US but highly so in Latin America.

The album has a dedication: "This record is dedicated to my father who gave me my Latin name and whatever optimism about life I may claim to have."

Professional ratings
Review scores
Source	Rating
Allmusic	link

== Track listing ==
1. "Gracias a la Vida" (Here's to Life) (Violeta Parra) – 3:30
2. "Llegó Con Tres Heridas" (He Came with Three Wounds) (From a poem by Miguel Hernández, set to music by Joan Manuel Serrat) – 2:11
3. "La Llorona" (The Weeping Woman) (Traditional) – 3:50
4. "El Preso Número Nueve" (Prisoner Number Nine) (Los Hermanos Cantoral) – 3:22
5. "Guantanamera" (Joseíto Fernández, José Martí, adapted by Julián Orbón) – 3:50
6. "Te Recuerdo Amanda" (I Remember You Amanda) (Víctor Jara) – 2:35
7. "Dida" (Joan Baez) – 3:35
8. "Cucurrucucú Paloma" (Tomás Méndez) – 4:50
9. "Paso Río" (I Pass a River) (Traditional) – 0:50
10. "El Rossinyol" (The Nightingale) (Traditional Catalan song) – 3:06
11. "De Colores" (In Colors) (Traditional) – 2:25
12. "Las Madres Cansadas" (All the Weary Mothers of the Earth) (Joan Baez) – 3:30
13. "No Nos Moverán" (We Shall Not Be Moved) (Traditional) – 3:20
14. "Esquinazo Del Guerrillero" (Guerilla Warrior's Serenade) (Rolando Alarcón, Fernando Alegría) – 2:40

== Personnel ==
- Joan Baez – lead vocals, acoustic and classical guitar
- Tommy Tedesco – lead guitar
- Jim Hughart – double bass
- Lalo Lindgron – harp
- Tom Scott – flute, woodwind, string arrangement
- Mariachi Uclatlan (4, 8)
- Rondalla Amerindia (13)
- Edgar Lustgarten – cello
- Milt Holland – percussion
- Joni Mitchell – vocal improvisation (7)
- Jackie Ward Singers, Sally Stevens, Andrea Willis – backing vocals (12)
