= Looking East =

Studio album by Jackson Browne
- Released: February 13, 1996
- Recorded: 1995
- Studio: Groove Masters, Santa Monica
- Genre: Rock
- Length: 50:30
- Label: Elektra
- Producer: Kevin McCormick, Scott Thurston

Jackson Browne chronology
| I'm Alive (1993) | Looking East (1996) | The Next Voice You Hear: The Best of Jackson Browne (1997) |

Singles from Looking East
- 1. "Looking East" Released: 1996; 2. "Some Bridges" Released: 1996; 3. "I'm the Cat" Released: 1996

Looking East is the eleventh album by American singer-songwriter Jackson Browne, released in 1996 (see 1996 in music). It peaked at number 36 on the Billboard 200.

== History ==
Coming over two years after his successful I'm Alive, Browne returned to more politically and socially oriented themes on Looking East. Only two songs are credited to Browne alone as composer, the rest co-credited with his core backing band. The most notable song, Barricades of Heaven is a reference to the "barrios" (Spanish for low income housing) of Los Angeles.

Guests include Bonnie Raitt, David Crosby, Vonda Shepard, Ry Cooder, Waddy Wachtel and David Lindley.

== Reception ==
Professional ratings
Review scores
| Source | Rating |
|---|---|
| AllMusic | 3/5 stars |
| The Encyclopedia of Popular Music | 2/5 stars |

Looking East was considered something of a letdown after the success of I'm Alive even after reaching the Top 40 of The Billboard 200. Critic William Ruhlman agreed, writing that the album "is a highly referential work from an artist who started where most end and has been earnestly seeking the right direction ever since. Looking East finds him in his own backyard, still searching."

== Track listing ==
All tracks are written by Jackson Browne, Luis Conte, Mark Goldenberg, Mauricio Lewak, Kevin McCormick, Scott Thurston and Jeff Young, except where noted.

| No. | Title | Writer(s) | Length |
|---|---|---|---|
| 1. | "Looking East" | | 4:56 |
| 2. | "The Barricades of Heaven" | | 5:42 |
| 3. | "Some Bridges" | | 4:51 |
| 4. | "Information Wars" | Browne, Jeff Cohen, Conte, Goldenberg, Lewak, McCormick, Thurston, Young | 5:14 |
| 5. | "I'm the Cat" | | 3:55 |
| 6. | "Culver Moon" | | 5:45 |
| 7. | "Baby How Long" | Browne | 5:05 |
| 8. | "Niño" | Browne, Valerie Carter, Jorge Calderón, Conte, Goldenberg, Lewak, McCormick, Thurston, Young | 5:14 |
| 9. | "Alive in the World" | Browne | 4:51 |
| 10. | "It Is One" | Browne, Carter, Conte, Goldenberg, Lewak, McCormick, Thurston, Young | 4:57 |
| Total length: | | | 50:30 |

== Personnel ==
- Jackson Browne – lead vocals, acoustic guitar (2), guitars (5, 10), acoustic piano (9)
- Benmont Tench – Hammond organ (1)
- Jeffrey Young – Hammond organ (2–10), harmony vocals (3, 5, 10), backing vocals (4), keyboards (10)
- Scott Thurston – guitars (1–3, 6, 7, 9), harmony vocals (2–4, 6), electric guitar (4), baritone guitar (5, 10), acoustic piano (8)
- Mark Goldenberg – guitars (1–3, 5–10), electric guitar (4), oud (4)
- Waddy Wachtel – guitars (1)
- Mike Campbell – 12-string guitar (2), guitars (5)
- David Lindley – lap steel guitar (3)
- Ry Cooder – slide guitar (7)
- Kevin McCormick – bass guitar, acoustic guitar (1, 2), harmony vocals (4, 10)
- Mauricio "Fritz" Lewak – drums
- Luis Conte – percussion
- Vonda Shepard – harmony vocals (1, 9)
- Beth Anderson – backing vocals (4)
- Suzie Benson – backing vocals (4)
- Mark Campbell – backing vocals (4)
- Jim Gilstrap – backing vocals (4)
- Jim Haas – backing vocals (4)
- Jon Joyce – backing vocals (4)
- Kipp Lennon – backing vocals (4)
- Phil Perry – backing vocals (4)
- Sally Stevens – backing vocals (4)
- Mark Vieha – backing vocals (4), BGV arrangements (4)
- Sir Harry Bowens – harmony vocals (5)
- William Greene Jr. – harmony vocals (5)
- Renée Geyer – harmony vocals (7)
- Bonnie Raitt – harmony vocals (7)
- Jorge Calderón – harmony vocals (8), Spanish vocals (8)
- Katia Cardenal – Spanish vocals (8)
- Salvador Cardenal – Spanish vocals (8)
- Severin Browne – harmony vocals (9)
- Valerie Carter – harmony vocals (8, 10)
- David Crosby – harmony vocals (9)

== Production ==
- Producers – Kevin McCormick and Scott Thurston
- Engineer – Paul Dieter
- Assistant Engineers – Sebastian Haimerl and Bob Salcedo
- Mixing – Ed Cherney
- Mastered by Gavin Lurssen and Doug Sax at The Mastering Lab (Hollywood, CA).
- Technicians – Bill Irvin and Ed Wong
- Piano Technician – Edd Kolakowski
- Art Direction and Design – Jackson Browne
- Photography – Dianna Cohen, Rob Gilley, Nels Israelson and Frank W. Ockenfels III.

== Charts ==
| Chart (1996) | Peak position |
|---|---|
| German Albums (Offizielle Top 100) | 80 |
| Swedish Albums (Sverigetopplistan) | 43 |
| UK Albums (Official Charts) | 47 |
| US Billboard 200 | 36 |
