= For Everyman (song) =

- 1973 advertisement

Song by Jackson Browne

from the album For Everyman
- Released: 1973
- Genre: Rock
- Length: 6:20
- Label: Asylum
- Songwriter: Jackson Browne
- Producer: Jackson Browne

"For Everyman" is a song written and performed by American singer-songwriter Jackson Browne. It is the title track to his second album For Everyman, released in 1973.

== Origin ==
Shortly after releasing his first album, Browne left Los Angeles where he'd grown up. He moved to the Bay Area of California where he looked for a house. He was invited to live with David Crosby on Crosby's boat, Mayan. He stayed there several months, not finding a home to rent or purchase, before going on tour to support his recently finished and released album. While staying with Crosby, Browne was introduced to two of Crosby's neighbors, who also owned boats. The two friends along with Crosby, often talked about fulfilling their idyllic dream of simply sailing off into the "sunset," presumably somewhere to the South Pacific. This was just a couple of years after Crosby, Stills & Nash had released their single "Wooden Ships" that contains the same theme. Crosby stated that the songwriters "imagined ourselves as the few survivors, escaping on a boat to create a new civilization." Browne admits that the dreamers were in a bit of a "fog," and composed his song as a response to their unrealizable dream. On his album Solo Acoustic, Vol. 1, Browne relays the story that the song was written "having spent some time with some people who were planning to sail away... I mean, and they had the boats to do it in, they knew what they were doing, they kinda had it all planned... Well, I won't say that they knew what they were doing, but they had a plan."

As Anthony DeCurtis told it in a 1999 retrospective album review of For Everyman, "The title track of Jackson Browne's second album, For Everyman, was a response to the escapist vision of Crosby, Stills and Nash's 'Wooden Ships.' As violence, fear and paranoia overtook Sixties utopianism, 'Wooden Ships' (written by Crosby and Stills, along with Paul Kantner of the Jefferson Airplane) imagined a kind of hipster exodus by sea from a straight world teetering on the edge of apocalypse: 'We are leaving/You don't need us,' the song declared. Browne wasn't giving up so easily... (He) sings in his characteristic long, fluid lines:"

Everybody I talk to is ready to leave with the light of the morning.
They've seen the end coming down long enough to believe that they've heard their last warning...
But all my fine dreams, well-thought-out schemes to gain the motherland
Have all eventually come down to waiting for Everyman.

"Deliverance must come for everyone, Browne insisted, not just hippie troubadours," wrote DeCurtis.

Browne entitled the song "For Everyman," taking the name for his song from the name of a boat that had sailed to the South Pacific to protest the testing of nuclear weapons in the early 1960s. Crosby sings harmony on the song.

== Reception ==
In her 1973 review of the album, Janet Maslin went straight to the title track as key on his second album of "inwardly panoramic songwriting of an apocalyptic bent:"

"'For Everyman' is a more thoughtful, less impetuous reworking of 'Rock Me on the Water;' both songs provide visions of the apocalypse, but this time the image is significantly altered. 'Rock Me' was a fiery youthful fantasy shot through with contempt (and) dreams of escape... 'For Everyman' presents the crisis in gentler terms ... and offers an impassioned discerner of special wisdom ('I'm not trying to tell you that I've seen the plan/Turn and walk away if you think I am'). Most notably, the renegade spirit who once dreamed of being bathed by 'the sisters of the sun' while everything around him went up in flames is now ready to be left behind on the eve of the exodus — 'holding sand ... weighing all my fine dreams, well thought-out schemes ...,' and realizing that this time patience may make more sense than flight." Critiquing the music, she wrote that she felt the song had one of the best arrangements on the album, describing how it "begins and ends with a low rumble from Russ Kunkel, then bursts out into a high-spirited release that mirrors the spirit of the song's resolution, simultaneously joyful and cautious."

== Personnel ==
Credits are adapted from the liner notes of The Very Best of Jackson Browne.

- Jackson Browne – lead vocals, acoustic guitar
- David Crosby – harmony vocals
- Craig Doerge – piano
- Russ Kunkel – drums
- David Lindley – acoustic guitar, electric guitar
- Leland Sklar – bass guitar
- Michael Utley – Hammond organ

== Style ==
On the studio album, the song "For Everyman" is joined, through a crossfade, to the song preceding it, "Sing My Songs to Me." This same structure is also used to join the first two songs on the album: "Take It Easy" plays into "Our Lady of the Well." Browne, rarely, if ever, plays "Sing My Songs to Me" in concert when playing "For Everyman."
