= Walking Slow =

- Label of U.S. Promotional Mono Single

Single by Jackson Browne

from the album Late for the Sky
- B-side: "Before the Deluge"
- Released: 1974
- Recorded: 1974
- Genre: Rock
- Length: 2:59 7" version; 3:50 album version
- Label: Asylum Records
- Songwriter(s): Jackson Browne
- Producer(s): Jackson Browne, Al Schmitt

Jackson Browne singles chronology
"Take It Easy" (1973)	"Walking Slow" (1974)	"Fountain of Sorrow" (1975)

"Walking Slow" is a song written and performed by American singer-songwriter Jackson Browne, released as the initial single from his 1974 classic album, Late for the Sky; however, the single failed to chart. It was also released as a promotional single in the United Kingdom.

== Reception ==
Stephen Holden, in his November 7, 1974, review of the Late for the Sky album, called the song "a crisp little rock song." Discussing the song in terms of the narrative progression of the album, Holden said the song celebrated "Browne's newfound domestic stability."

Cash Box said that "bumping and jumping, Jackson walks along supported by twin electric guitars and it seems he is heading straight towards a hit." Record World said that "Powered by some old-fashioned hand-clappin' and jug blowin', this mighty cut...is right on time."

== Personnel ==
Professional jug band musician Fritz Richmond is credited with playing jug on the track.

- David Lindley: electric slide guitar
- Larry Zack: drums
- Doug Haywood: bass guitar, harmony vocals
- Jai Winding: piano
- Jackson Browne: lead vocals
