= Diamonds & Rust =

Studio album by Joan Baez
- Released: April 1975
- Recorded: January 1975
- Studios: A&M (Hollywood); Wally Heider's Studio 3 (Hollywood); Malcolm Cecil and Robert Margouleff
- Genres: Folk rock, folk jazz
- Length: 39:45
- Label: A&M
- Producers: David Kershenbaum, Joan Baez, Larry Carlton

Joan Baez chronology
Gracias a la Vida (1974)	Diamonds & Rust (1975)	From Every Stage (1976)

Singles from Diamonds & Rust
- 1. "Blue Sky / Dida" Released: 1975; 2. "Diamonds & Rust / Winds of the Old Days" Released: 1975; 3. "Never Dreamed You'd Leave in Summer / Children and All That Jazz" Released: 1976

Professional ratings
Review scores
Source	Rating
AllMusic	5/5 stars
The Village Voice	C

Diamonds & Rust is the sixteenth studio album (and eighteenth overall) by American singer-songwriter Joan Baez, released in 1975. The album covered songs written or played by Bob Dylan, Stevie Wonder, the Allman Brothers, Jackson Browne, and John Prine. Diamonds & Rust, however, also contains a number of her own compositions, including the title track, a distinctive song written probably about Bob Dylan, which has been covered by various other artists.

An alternate recording of "Dida" had appeared on the previous year's Gracias a la Vida.

== Track listing ==
Side one

1. "Diamonds & Rust" (Baez) – 4:47
2. "Fountain of Sorrow" (Jackson Browne) – 4:30
3. "Never Dreamed You'd Leave in Summer" (Stevie Wonder, Syreeta Wright) – 2:45
4. "Children and All That Jazz" (Baez) – 3:07
5. "Simple Twist of Fate" (Bob Dylan) – 4:44

Side two

1. "Blue Sky" (Dickey Betts) – 2:46
2. "Hello in There" (John Prine) – 3:05
3. "Jesse" (Janis Ian) – 4:28
4. "Winds of the Old Days" (Baez) – 3:55
5. "Dida" (Baez) duet with Joni Mitchell – 3:25
6. Medley: "I Dream of Jeannie" (Stephen Foster; arranged by Joan Baez) / "Danny Boy" (Frederic Weatherly) – 4:13

== Personnel ==
- Joan Baez – vocals, acoustic guitar, Moog and ARP synthesisers, arranger
- Larry Carlton – electric guitar, acoustic guitar, arranger
- Dean Parks – electric guitar, acoustic guitar
- Rick Lotempio – electric guitar (track 10)
- Wilton Felder – bass guitar
- Reinie Press – bass guitar
- Max Bennett – bass guitar (track 10)
- Jim Gordon – drums
- John Guerin – drums (track 10)
- Larry Knechtel – acoustic piano
- Hampton Hawes – acoustic piano (track 4)
- David Paich – acoustic piano, electric harpsichord
- Joe Sample – electric piano, Hammond organ
- Red Rhodes – pedal steel guitar
- Malcolm Cecil – Moog and ARP synthesisers, synthesizer programming
- Robert Margouleff – synthesizer programming
- Tom Scott – flute, saxophone, arranger
- Jim Horn – saxophone
- Ollie Mitchell – trumpet
- Buck Monari – trumpet
- Jesse Ehrlich – cello
- Carl LaMagna, James Getzoff, Ray Kelley, Robert Konrad, Robert Ostrowsky, Ronald Folsom, Sidney Sharp, Tibor Zelig, William Hymanson, William Kurasch – violin
- Isabelle Daskoff – viola
- Joni Mitchell – vocal improvisation (track 10)

Technical

- David Kershenbaum, Joan Baez, Larry Carlton – producer
- Bernard Gelb – executive producer
- Rick Ruggeri – engineer
- Henry Lewy – engineer (track 10)
- Ellis Sorkin – assistant engineer
- Bob Cato – design
- Irene Harris – photography

== Charts ==
=== Weekly charts ===
Chart (1975–1976)	Peak position
Australian Albums (Kent Music Report)	62
Canada Top Albums/CDs (RPM)	28
US Billboard 200	11

Chart (2025)	Peak position
Greek Albums (IFPI)	92

=== Year-end charts ===
Chart (1975)	Position
US Billboard 200	45

== Certifications ==
Certifications for Diamonds & Rust
Region	Certification	Certified units/sales
United States (RIAA)	Gold	500,000^{^}
^{^} Shipments figures based on certification alone.
