= Somebody's Baby =

Single by Jackson Browne

from the album Fast Times at Ridgemont High: Music from the Motion Picture
- B-side: "The Crow on the Cradle"
- Released: July 1982
- Recorded: 1982
- Genre: Rock
- Length: 4:05 (album/single version); 4:22 (extended version)
- Label: Asylum
- Songwriters: Jackson Browne, Danny Kortchmar
- Producer: Jackson Browne

Jackson Browne singles chronology
"Hold On Hold Out" (1981)	"Somebody's Baby" (1982)	"Lawyers In Love" (1983)

"Somebody's Baby" is a song written by Jackson Browne and Danny Kortchmar and recorded by Browne for the 1982 Fast Times at Ridgemont High movie soundtrack. Reaching No. 7 on the US Billboard Hot 100 after debuting at No. 73 on July 31, 1982, the track would be Browne's last top ten hit, as well as the highest-charting single of his career, spending a total of nineteen weeks on the chart. In the film, the song is prominently associated with Stacy Hamilton, portrayed by Jennifer Jason Leigh.

The song reached No. 14 on the Billboard Adult Contemporary chart, as well. In Canada, "Somebody's Baby" peaked at No. 16. The single was also released in Italy, Spain and Japan.

It has since been released on several of Browne's greatest hits albums, including The Next Voice You Hear: The Best of Jackson Browne and The Very Best of Jackson Browne. An unplugged acoustic version appears on Browne's album entitled Solo Acoustic, Vol. 2 (2008).

== Critical reception ==
Cash Box said that "Browne has come up with a most appealing first single from the soundtrack to Fast Times at Ridgemont High." Billboard called it a "midtempo rocker" which was not one of Browne's "most arresting compositions" but would still "appeal to pop and AOR formats."

Ultimate Classic Rock critic Michael Gallucci rated it as Browne's 3rd greatest song, calling it "one of his most unlikely songs, a sweet, and surprisingly despair-free, love song." Classic Rock History critic Brian Kachejian rated it as Browne's 5th greatest song, saying that "There is no better soundtrack song in the genre of teen movies than Jackson Browne's 'Somebody's Baby'" and that although it's "the most pop-oriented hit of his career...it was pop music perfection that was all substance."

== Personnel ==
- Jackson Browne – lead vocals
- Craig Doerge – electric piano, synthesizers, clavinet
- Doug Haywood – Hammond organ, harmony vocals
- Danny Kortchmar – guitar (right channel)
- Rick Vito – guitar (left channel)
- Bob Glaub – bass
- Russ Kunkel – drums

== Charts ==
=== Weekly charts ===
Chart (1982)	Peak position
Australia KMR	26
Canada RPM Top Singles	16
US Billboard Hot 100	7
US Billboard Mainstream Rock	4
US Billboard Adult Contemporary	14
US Cash Box Top 100	5

=== Year-end charts ===
Chart (1982)	Rank
US Billboard Hot 100	68
US Cash Box	33

== Other versions ==
- Recording artist Sidney Gish released a cover of the song in 2019 as a part of Cavetown's Animal Kingdom series.
- American rock band Yo La Tengo released a version on the 1988 compilation album entitled Human Music (HMS100) (Homestead Records).
- It was covered by Andru Donalds for the soundtrack for Good Will Hunting (1997).
- Phantom Planet covered the song for the soundtrack for Not Another Teen Movie (2001).
- Country music singer-songwriter Eric Heatherly covered the song on his album 2 High 2 Cry (2009).
- Spoken word poet and rapper B. Dolan featured the song on his concept album The Failure (2008).
- Free Energy covered the song in 2013.
- Have Mercy covered the song for their portion of the 2015 split EP with Somos.
