= Dianna Cohen =

Artist, activist and CEO

- Born: 1965 (age 60–61); Los Angeles, California, U.S.
- Education: University of California, Los Angeles
- Occupations: Activist and visual artist
- Years active: 1989–present
- Known for: Plastic Pollution Coalition (co-founder)
- Website: diannacohen.com

Dianna Cohen is an American visual artist and activist. She is the CEO and co-founder of the Plastic Pollution Coalition, an advocacy group and social movement organization which seeks to reduce plastic pollution.

== Early life and education ==
Cohen was born into a Jewish family in Los Angeles, California. Her father was a filmmaker, and her mother the director of the Los Angeles Free Clinic. She attended University of California, Los Angeles (UCLA), where she studied biology before shifting her major to art.

== Career ==
Following her graduation, Cohen began working in collage, initially using deconstructed brown paper bags, and later incorporating plastic. Her first solo exhibition of the bag series was in 1994.

After eight years of working with plastic bags, Cohen realized the plastic was degrading. In a 2015 interview she said: “At first I got excited because I thought that it meant the plastic bags were ephemeral and organic like us, and that they had a finite lifespan.” In researching the subject, she discovered that "plastic photodegrades or heat-degrades by breaking apart, but does not disappear." In 2009, after learning about the Great Pacific Garbage Patch, she founded the Plastic Pollution Coalition (PPC) with her sister, Julia Cohen, Manuel Maqueda, Daniella Russo and Lisa Boyle. She has led the Plastic Pollution Coalition's efforts to eliminate the use of single-use containers for beer, water and other drinks at music festivals and concerts.

== Awards ==
Cohen has received awards for her environmental activism. In 2017, she was awarded the Global Green Award. She was named Environmentalist of the Year by SIMA in 2019. In 2016, she was presented the inaugural Snow Angel Award by the Sun Valley Film Festival.

== Personal life ==
Cohen and her partner, Jackson Browne, live in Los Angeles. They were co-executive producers on the 2020 documentary The Story of Plastic. She has surfed since 1996.
