= Fountain of Sorrow =

- 7-inch DJ promotional mono single label

Single by Jackson Browne

from the album Late for the Sky
- B-side: "The Late Show"
- Released: 1975
- Recorded: 1974
- Length: 4:37 – 7" version; 6:42 – album version
- Label: Asylum Records
- Songwriter: Jackson Browne
- Producers: Jackson Browne, Al Schmitt

Jackson Browne singles chronology
"Walking Slow" (1974)	"Fountain of Sorrow" (1975)	"Here Come Those Tears Again" (1976)

"Fountain of Sorrow" is a song written and performed by American singer-songwriter Jackson Browne. Released as the second single from his 1974 album Late for the Sky, at 6:42, it was the longest song on the album, and the longest song Browne had yet released ("For Everyman" was approximately 6:20). Two minutes were removed from the single release of "Fountain of Sorrow", but the song still failed to chart on Billboard's Hot 100.

== Origin ==
The song is generally assumed to have been inspired by Browne's brief relationship with Joni Mitchell.

== Reaction ==
Many critics have written of the relationship song (and the album it is from) as reflecting a larger, general zeitgeist for the post-Vietnam War, post-Nixon era Baby boomer audience, particularly the notable "You've known that hollow sound of your own steps in flight" line in the chorus. "The fondly reflective 'Fountain of Sorrow,' is typical of Browne's ability to make personal experience seem universal," said Gil Asakawa, in Musichound Rock: The Essential Album Guide. Indeed, Joan Baez immediately recorded her own version of the song for her 1975 solo album, Diamonds & Rust, placing it directly in the song listing after her title track, a remembrance song of her relationship with Bob Dylan in the 1960s and 1970s.

== Reception ==
Los Angeles Times critic Robert Hilburn said that "Fountain of Sorrow" "speaks of the perennial search for someone new – an effort that combines some renewed optimism with the lingering knowledge of past failures."

In his 1974 Rolling Stone review of Late for the Sky, Stephen Holden wrote that the song "develops parallel themes of sex and nothingness, fantasy and realism, as Browne, looking at the photograph of a former lover, recalls:"

When you see through love's illusion, there lies the danger
And your perfect lover just looks like a perfect fool
So you go running off in search of a perfect stranger
While the loneliness seems to spring from your life
Like a fountain from a pool...

"In the chorus, highly romanticized sexuality becomes a 'fountain of sorrow, fountain of light.' Later in the album the water images are developed into a larger metaphor for death and rebirth," wrote Holden.

Robert Christgau called the song the best on the album: "I admit that the longest is also the best, an intricate extended metaphor called 'Fountain of Sorrow.'" Cash Box said that Browne "uses his unique country-influenced balladry to his fullest about the highs and lows of love."

In his 2008 book 1,000 Recordings to Hear Before You Die, Tom Moon wrote that Browne's lost seeker's "inquiry leads him into the minefields of memory" on "Fountain of Sorrow," in which "a photograph opens the floodgates".

Browne biographer Mark Bego called it "a beautiful and medium-paced ballad of lost love" that was Browne's "most masterful vocal performance to date." Bego said that "it has a nice lively beat" and that Browne is "reminiscing instead of lamenting." Bego says that in the lyrics, when the singer finds an old photograph in a drawer and remembers taking the picture, "he is finally able to put this failed relationship into perspective."

Music critic Gil Asakawa called it the best song on "Late for the Sky", describing it as "fondly reflective" and saying that it "is typical of Browne's ability to make personal experiences seem universal."

Glide critic Lee Zimmerman rated it as one of 10 Jackson Browne songs that should have been a hit. Zimmerman described it as "a brooding ballad and excellent example of Browne’s ability to draw on remorse and pathos" and said that "it offers enough optimism to ensure at least a semi-happy ending" but felt that "it may have been a bit too introspective to attain a wider reach."

== Personnel ==
Credits are adapted from the liner notes of The Very Best of Jackson Browne.

- Jackson Browne – lead vocals, acoustic guitar
- Dan Fogelberg, Don Henley, JD Souther – harmony vocals
- Doug Haywood – bass guitar, harmony vocals
- David Lindley – electric guitar
- Jai Winding – piano
- Larry Zack – drums, percussion

== Other versions ==
A live solo version by Browne at the piano is available on his 2005 release Solo Acoustic, Vol. 1.

- Joan Baez – Diamonds & Rust, 1975.
