= I'm Alive (Jackson Browne album) =

Studio album by Jackson Browne
- Released: October 11, 1993
- Recorded: 1992
- Studios: Groove Masters (Santa Monica, California)
- Genre: Rock
- Length: 47:03
- Label: Elektra
- Producers: Jackson Browne; Scott Thurston; Don Was

Jackson Browne chronology
World in Motion (1989)	I'm Alive (1993)	Looking East (1996)

Singles from I'm Alive
- 1. "I'm Alive" Released: 1993; 2. "Miles Away" Released: 1993; 3. "My Problem is You" Released: 1993; 4. "Everywhere I Go" Released: 1994; 5. "Sky Blue and Black" Released: 1994

I'm Alive is the tenth album by American singer-songwriter Jackson Browne, released in 1993 (see 1993 in music). The title track, "I'm Alive", reached No. 18 on the Album Rock Tracks chart and No. 28 on the Adult Contemporary chart. Other singles released from the album were "Everywhere I Go" (UK No. 67) and "Sky Blue and Black".

== History ==
After veering heavily towards songs of a political nature on his two previous albums, longtime fans of Browne welcomed the return on I'm Alive to his previous style of songwriting.

The song "Too Many Angels" includes backing vocals by Jennifer Warnes, Valerie Carter, Doug Haywood, Katia Cardenal, and Ryan Browne, while the song "All Good Things" includes backing vocals by David Crosby and Don Henley. The song "Sky Blue and Black" was also featured in the pilot episode of American situation comedy Friends.

In an interview on Off Camera with Sam Jones, Jackson Browne stated that the song "I'll Do Anything" was originally written to be the title song for the James L. Brooks movie of the same name. It was to be a comedic song sung by Albert Brooks where he is begging a test audience to favorably review his latest film.

The album was certified as a gold record in 1995 by the RIAA. A television special aired on the Disney Channel on June 25, 1993, to coincide with this album, entitled "Jackson Browne: Going Home".

== Reception ==
Professional ratings
Review scores
Source	Rating
AllMusic	3/5 stars
The Encyclopedia of Popular Music	5/5 stars
Q	4/5 stars
Rolling Stone	3.5/5 stars
The Rolling Stone Record Guide	2.5/5 stars

I'm Alive was considered somewhat of a comeback for Browne. Stephen Holden writing for The New York Times wrote "I'm Alive is a striking return to the kind of romantic subject matter that the Los Angeles singer and songwriter seemed to have abandoned after 1980 in favor of political songwriting. His finest album in nearly two decades, it has much in common with his 1974 masterpiece, Late for the Sky, whose songs also described the disintegration of a relationship."

Critic William Ruhlman agreed though did not consider the album as strong. "Longtime fans welcomed the album as a return in style... Browne eschewed the greater philosophical implications of romance and, falling back on stock imagery (angels, rain), failed to achieve an originality of expression. While it was good news that he wasn't tilting at windmills anymore, Browne did not make a full comeback with the album, despite a couple of well-constructed songs." The Rolling Stone Record Guide wrote Browne "returned to his forte: the personal joy and agony of day-to-day human interaction."

In the original Rolling Stone review for the album from 1993, Kara Manning expressed the belief that "Browne has successfully managed to resurrect his persona of 20 years ago. I'm Alive shudders with the pain of someone who's been soundly dumped. And Browne has even gained a sense of gallows humor. Between despondent cries for reconciliation, the singer indulges in refreshingly silly self-deprecation." However, she wondered, "what does a younger, angrier generation – raging to Dr. Dre and Nirvana – make of all this? But '70s nostalgia is on a roll..."

The album was in Q's list of "The 50 Best Albums Of 1993". It was voted number 456 in Colin Larkin's All Time Top 1000 Albums.

== Track listing ==
All tracks composed by Jackson Browne.

1. "I'm Alive" – 5:01
2. "My Problem Is You" – 4:40
3. "Everywhere I Go" – 4:36
4. "I'll Do Anything" – 4:31
5. "Miles Away" – 3:52
6. "Too Many Angels" – 6:04
7. "Take This Rain" – 4:49
8. "Two of Me, Two of You" – 2:56
9. "Sky Blue and Black" – 6:06
10. "All Good Things" – 4:28

== Personnel ==
- Jackson Browne – lead vocals, acoustic guitar (1, 5, 6, 10), acoustic piano (2, 4, 7, 9, 10), guitars (3), backing vocals (6)
- Benmont Tench – Hammond organ (1, 2, 5–8, 10)
- Jai Winding – acoustic piano (8)
- Scott Thurston – guitars (1, 5, 9), backing vocals (1, 3, 5, 7), keyboards (3, 4, 6, 9, 10)
- Mark Goldenberg – guitars (1, 9)
- John Leventhal – guitars (2, 4), acoustic guitar (8)
- David Lindley – guitars (2), bouzouki (6), oud (6)
- Dean Parks – acoustic guitar (2)
- Waddy Wachtel – guitars (3, 7)
- Mike Campbell – guitars (5, 7, 10)
- Kevin McCormick – bass guitar (1, 3–5, 7–10)
- James "Hutch" Hutchinson – bass guitar (2, 6)
- Mauricio-Fritz Lewak – drums (1, 3–5, 7, 9, 10), additional drums (6)
- Jim Keltner – drums (2, 6)
- Luis Conte – percussion (1–5, 7–10)
- Lenny Castro – percussion (2, 6)
- Sweet Pea Atkinson – backing vocals (2)
- Sir Harry Bowens – backing vocals (2)
- William "Bill" Greene – backing vocals (2)
- Arnold McCuller – backing vocals (2, 4, 9)
- Valerie Carter – backing vocals (4, 6, 9)
- Ryan Browne – backing vocals (6)
- Katia Cardenal – backing vocals (6)
- Doug Haywood – backing vocals (6)
- Jennifer Warnes – backing vocals (6)
- Steven Soles – backing vocals (7)
- David Crosby – backing vocals (10)
- Don Henley – backing vocals (10)

== Production ==
- Producers – Jackson Browne and Scott Thurston (Tracks 1, 3–5 & 7–10); Don Was (Tracks 2 & 6).
- Assistant Producer – Susann McMahon
- Engineers – Paul Dieter (Tracks 1, 3–5 & 7–10); Rik Pekkonen (Tracks 2 & 6).
- Assistant Engineers – Steve Onuska, Bob Salcedo and Kathy Yore.
- Mixed by Ed Cherney
- Mastered by Gavin Lurssen and Doug Sax at The Mastering Lab (Hollywood, California)
- Technical Engineer – Ed Wong, assisted by Bill Irvin.
- Piano Technician – Edd Kolakowski
- Art Direction – Robin Lynch
- Design – Robin Lynch and Alli Truch
- Photography – Bruce Weber

== Charts ==
Chart (1993)	Peak position
German Albums (Offizielle Top 100)	88
Swedish Albums (Sverigetopplistan)	24
UK Albums (Official Charts)	35
US Billboard 200	40

Singles – Billboard (United States)

Year	Single	Chart	Position
1993	"I'm Alive"	Bubbling Under the Hot 100	18
1993	"I'm Alive"	Mainstream Rock Tracks	18
1993	"I'm Alive"	Adult Contemporary	28
1994	"Everywhere I Go"	UK Singles Chart	67
