= Late for the Sky =

Studio album by Jackson Browne
- Released: September 13, 1974
- Recorded: 1974
- Studios: Elektra, Los Angeles; Hollywood Sound, Hollywood; Sunset Sound, Hollywood
- Genre: Rock
- Length: 40:38
- Label: Asylum
- Producers: Jackson Browne, Al Schmitt

Jackson Browne chronology
For Everyman (1973)	Late for the Sky (1974)	The Pretender (1976)

Singles from Late for the Sky
- 1. "Walking Slow" Released: January 1975; 2. "Fountain of Sorrow" Released: 1975

Late for the Sky is the third studio album by American singer–songwriter Jackson Browne, released by Asylum Records on September 13, 1974. It peaked at number 14 on Billboard's Pop Albums chart.

In 2020, the album was deemed "culturally, historically, or aesthetically significant" by the Library of Congress and selected for preservation in the National Recording Registry.

== Background ==
Browne was still living in his childhood home, Abbey San Encino, where he began writing the songs for his third album. Because of the high costs of recording his previous album, Asylum Records founder David Geffen required him to complete this next album quicker and at less cost. Browne decided to use his touring band of David Lindley, Doug Haywood, Jai Winding, and Larry Zack. It was also decided that Al Schmitt, an engineer on For Everyman, would co-produce to aid in the album being completed on time. The album was completed in six weeks and at half the cost ($50,000) of For Everyman. Numerous friends of Browne, including Dan Fogelberg, Don Henley, and JD Souther contributed harmony vocals. There were only eight songs on the album, five of them longer than five minutes.

== Cover ==
Browne has publicly acknowledged that the cover art for Late for the Sky was inspired by the 1954 painting L'Empire des Lumieres ("Empire of Light"), by Belgian surrealist René Magritte. The album itself contains the credit, "cover concept Jackson Browne if it's all reet with Magritte". The original photograph was shot on South Lucerne Avenue just south of West 2nd Street in Windsor Square, about 10 miles southwest of Browne's childhood home, the Abbey San Encino, in Highland Park, California. Designer and front cover photographer Bob Seidemann said, "I spoke to Jackson in 1980 and he told me he thought it was his favorite cover. Lest the jacket appear too funereal, a mood-defusing photo of a relaxed Jackson, almost smiling and looking as though he has a surprise to share, occupies a small square of the back cover."

== Reception ==
Retrospective professional reviews
Review scores
Source	Rating
AllMusic	5/5 stars
Christgau's Record Guide	B−
The Encyclopedia of Popular Music	5/5 stars
Tom Hull	B
MusicHound Rock: The Essential Album Guide	4/5
The Rolling Stone Album Guide	5/5 stars

Reviewing for Rolling Stone in 1974, Stephen Holden highly praised the album, calling it Browne's "most mature, conceptually unified work to date" and saying that the "...open-ended poetry achieves power from the nearly religious intensity that accumulates around the central motifs; its fervor is underscored by the sparest and hardest production to be found on any Browne album yet... as well as by his impassioned, oracular singing style."

In a retrospective review for AllMusic, William Ruhlmann describes the themes of the album as "love, loss, identity, apocalypse", similar to Browne's debut album, feeling that Browne "delved even deeper into them...Yet his seeming uncertainty and self-doubt reflected the size and complexity of the problems he was addressing in these songs, and few had ever explored such territory, much less mapped it so well."

According to The Rolling Stone Album Guide, Late for the Sky "strengthens and solidifies Browne’s approach; it’s the quintessential Browne album. The metaphorical complexity of 'Fountain of Sorrow' and the clear-eyed poignancy of 'For a Dancer' would be a tough act to follow...when his songwriting is sharp, the mellowing trend in his music dulls the impact." A 1999 Rolling Stone review of For Everyman called Late for the Sky Browne's "masterpiece".

MusicHound Rock: The Essential Album Guide calls it "a bit mopey, but it hangs together as Jackson Browne's strongest and most melodious album, with a couple of rockers thrown in to perk up the listeners." Robert Christgau was more critical in Christgau's Record Guide: Rock Albums of the Seventies (1981), saying that Browne's "linguistic gentility is inappropriate, his millenarianism is self-indulgent."

Ultimate Classic Rock critic Michael Gallucci rated two songs from the album, "Before the Deluge" and "Late for the Sky", as being among Browne's top 10 songs. Gallucci stated that "Before the Deluge" "piles on the apocalyptic dread" and "could be heralding the end of a relationship ... or maybe something much, much bigger" Gallucci felt that "it foreshadows themes of growing up and out of youthful idealism found on The Pretender, and Running on Empty, but with more widespread and cataclysmic results."

In his speech inducting Browne into the Rock and Roll Hall of Fame, Bruce Springsteen called Late for the Sky Browne's "masterpiece" and referred to the car doors slamming at the end of "The Late Show".

In 2000 it was voted number 594 in Colin Larkin's All Time Top 1000 Albums.

In 2003, the album was ranked number 372 on Rolling Stone magazine's list of the 500 greatest albums of all time, Browne's highest ranking. In a 2012 update it ranked at 377.

The album was certified as a Gold record in 1974 and Platinum in 1989 by the Recording Industry Association of America (RIAA).

== In popular culture ==
"For a Dancer" has a unique connection to Saturday Night Live. The song was played at memorial services for both John Belushi and Phil Hartman (by Browne at the Hartman service).

The title track was used in the 1976 Martin Scorsese film Taxi Driver.

"Fountain of Sorrow" was covered by Joan Baez on her 1975 album Diamonds & Rust; "Before the Deluge" was covered by Joan Baez on her 1979 album Honest Lullaby; Baez and Browne performed the song together on her 1989 PBS concert special. It was also covered in 1981 by Irish group Moving Hearts on their eponymous debut album;"Walking Slow" and "Fountain of Sorrow" were released as singles but both failed to chart.

The title track is included as essay twenty in Songbook (published in the United Kingdom as 31 Songs) by Nick Hornby.

== Track listing ==
All tracks are written by Jackson Browne.

Side one

1. "Late for the Sky" – 5:36
2. "Fountain of Sorrow" – 6:42
3. "Farther On" – 5:17
4. "The Late Show" – 5:09

Side two

1. "The Road and the Sky" – 3:04
2. "For a Dancer" – 4:42
3. "Walking Slow" – 3:50
4. "Before the Deluge" – 6:18

== Personnel ==
- Jackson Browne – vocals, acoustic guitar, piano, slide guitar (on "The Road and The Sky")
- David Lindley – electric guitar, lap steel guitar, fiddle; harmony vocals (as Perry Lindley)
- David Campbell – string arrangement on "The Late Show"
- Jai Winding – piano, Hammond organ
- Doug Haywood – bass guitar, harmony vocals
- Larry Zack – drums, percussion
- Joyce Everson and Beth Fitchet – women harmony vocals
- Dan Fogelberg, Terry Reid and Don Henley – harmony vocals
- Fritz Richmond – jug on "Walking Slow"
- JD Souther – harmony vocals
- H. Driver, Henry Thome, Michael Condello – handclaps

Production notes:

- Jackson Browne – producer, cover concept
- Al Schmitt – producer
- Kent Nebergall – engineer
- Tom Perry – engineer
- Fritz Richmond – engineer
- Greg Ladanyi – mastering
- Bob Seidemann – front cover, design
- Rick Griffin – front cover lettering
- Henry Diltz – back cover photography

== Charts ==
=== Weekly charts ===
Chart (1974)	Peak position
Canada Top Albums/CDs (RPM)	14
US Billboard 200	14

=== Year-end charts ===
Chart (1975)	Position
US Billboard 200	57
