= I'm Alive (Jackson Browne song) =

- Promo CD Single Cover

Single by Jackson Browne

from the album I'm Alive
- Released: 1993
- Recorded: 1992
- Genre: Rock
- Length: 5:01; 4:53 (promo CD version)
- Label: Elektra Records
- Songwriter: Jackson Browne
- Producers: Jackson Browne, Scott Thurston, Waddy Wachtel, Don Was

Jackson Browne singles chronology
| "World in Motion" (1989) | "I'm Alive" (1993) | "Sky Blue and Black" (1994) |

"I'm Alive" is the lead and title track by Jackson Browne from his 1993 album I'm Alive.

The song reached #18 on the Mainstream Rock Tracks Chart and #28 on the Adult Contemporary Chart in the United States.

== Charts ==
=== Weekly charts ===
Singles - Billboard (United States)

| Year | Single | Chart | Position |
|---|---|---|---|
| 1993 | "I'm Alive" | Mainstream Rock Tracks | 18 |
| 1993 | "I'm Alive" | Bubbling Under the Hot 100 | 18 |
| 1993 | "I'm Alive" | Adult Contemporary | 28 |

=== Year-end charts ===
| Chart (1994) | Position |
|---|---|
| Canada Top Singles (RPM) | 99 |
