= Fast Times at Ridgemont High =

1982 film directed by Amy Heckerling

- Theatrical release poster
- Directed by: Amy Heckerling
- Screenplay by: Cameron Crowe
- Based on: Fast Times at Ridgemont High: A True Story by Cameron Crowe
- Produced by: Irving Azoff; Art Linson
- Starring: Sean Penn; Jennifer Jason Leigh; Judge Reinhold; Phoebe Cates; Brian Backer; Robert Romanus; Ray Walston
- Cinematography: Matthew F. Leonetti
- Edited by: Eric Jenkins
- Production company: Refugee Films
- Distributed by: Universal Pictures
- Release date: August 13, 1982
- Running time: 90 minutes
- Country: United States
- Language: English
- Budget: $5 million
- Box office: $27.1 million (domestic) or $50 million

Fast Times at Ridgemont High is a 1982 American coming-of-age comedy-drama film directed by Amy Heckerling in her feature directorial debut. The screenplay was written by Cameron Crowe, based on his 1981 book Fast Times at Ridgemont High: A True Story, and the film stars Sean Penn, Jennifer Jason Leigh, Judge Reinhold, Phoebe Cates, Brian Backer, Robert Romanus, and Ray Walston. Crowe went undercover as a student at Clairemont High School in San Diego and wrote about his experiences.

The film chronicles a school year in the lives of underclassmen Stacy Hamilton and Mark Ratner, and their older friends Linda Barrett and Mike Damone, both of whom believe themselves wiser in the ways of romance than their younger counterparts. The ensemble cast of characters form two subplots with Jeff Spicoli, a perpetually stoned surfer facing off against history teacher Mr. Hand; and Stacy's older brother Brad, a popular senior who works in entry-level jobs to pay for his car and ponders ending his two-year relationship with his girlfriend Lisa.

In addition to Penn, Reinhold, Cates, and Leigh, the film marks early appearances by several actors who later became stars, including Nicolas Cage, Eric Stoltz, Forest Whitaker, and Anthony Edwards (the first two in their feature-film debuts).

Fast Times at Ridgemont High was released by Universal Pictures on August 13, 1982. The film received positive reviews from critics and was a box office success. In 2005, the film was selected for preservation in the United States National Film Registry by the Library of Congress as being "culturally, historically, or aesthetically significant".

== Plot ==
In the San Fernando Valley, popular Ridgemont High student Brad Hamilton has a job at All-American Burger, his 1960 Buick is almost paid off, and he plans to break up with his girlfriend Lisa to fully enjoy his senior year. Brad's sister Stacy is a 15-year-old freshman, working at Perry's Pizza at Ridgemont Mall alongside her senior friend Linda Barrett. Stacy envies Linda's supposed sexual experience, so Linda—who claims to be engaged to college-student Doug—gives her pointers. Smooth-talker Mike Damone fancies himself a worldly ladies' man, earns money taking sports bets and scalping concert tickets. Mark "Rat" Ratner, Damone's best friend, is an usher at the movie theater across from Perry's Pizza. Stoner Jeff Spicoli is a slacker who lives only for surfing and getting high. On the first day of class, he arrives late and clashes with his history teacher, Mr. Hand. Mr. Hand attempts to get Spicoli to take his studies more seriously.

At Perry's Pizza, 26-year-old stereo salesman Ron Johnson asks Stacy for a date. She lies about her age and ends up losing her virginity to him in a baseball field dugout. Ron sends her flowers the next day, but soon disappears.

When Rat meets Stacy in a biology class taught by Mr. Vargas, he is smitten, and takes her on a date. Stacy invites Rat into her bedroom after the date, but he nervously makes up an excuse and leaves before they get beyond kissing. She takes his shyness as lack of interest. Linda suggests that she forget him.

Brad is fired after arguing with a customer. He seeks Lisa's support during a pep rally, but she instead breaks up with him. He gets a new job at Captain Hook Fish & Chips.

Spicoli accidentally wrecks the Camaro of Ridgemont star football player Charles Jefferson while driving Jefferson's younger brother to a party. Spicoli makes it seem like Lincoln High School fans destroyed Jefferson's car, inspiring Jefferson to make numerous brutal tackles in the game against Lincoln, blowing them out 42–0.

Rat and Damone join Stacy and Linda after school in the Hamiltons' pool, as Brad masturbates in the bathroom while imagining Linda undressing, only to get caught when Linda accidentally walks in.

Stacy rebounds from Rat with Damone by inviting him over to go swimming. The two have sex in the Hamiltons' pool house and Damone ejaculates prematurely and immediately leaves. Embarrassed, he avoids her at school, though Stacy has no idea why.

Brad quits his new job due to people constantly mocking his pirate uniform. When Stacy informs Damone he has gotten her pregnant, she asks him to help finance an abortion and take her to a clinic. Unable to come up with his half, he blows her off. Stacy asks Brad to drive her, supposedly to go bowling with friends, but he watches her enter the abortion clinic. Afterwards, Brad reveals that he knows the truth. He promises not to tell their parents, but she does not divulge who impregnated her. Stacy instead tells Linda, who in revenge spray-paints "Prick" on Damone's car and school locker. After hearing about it, Rat angrily confronts Damone about his involvement with Stacy and they nearly get into a fist fight in the school locker room.

On the evening of the last dance of the year, Mr. Hand forces Spicoli to endure a lengthy history lecture to make up for the hours of class time he had wasted until he is satisfied Spicoli has learned his lesson. Rat and Damone make peace. Stacy comforts Linda when she receives a breakup letter from her supposed fiancé Doug.

Stacy later professes feelings for Rat. At Brad's new job at Mi-T-Mart, he foils an armed robbery with help from Spicoli who inadvertently distracts the robber.

A postscript reveals that Brad was promoted to manager of Mi-T-Mart. Damone got busted for scalping Ozzy Osbourne tickets and is now working at a 7-Eleven. Mr. Vargas switched back to coffee. Linda attended college in Riverside and started living with her abnormal psychology professor. Rat and Stacy have a passionate love affair, but have not yet gone all the way. Mr. Hand believes that everyone is on dope. Spicoli saves Brooke Shields from drowning and blows the reward money hiring Van Halen to play his birthday party.

== Cast ==
- Sean Penn as Jeff Spicoli, a stoner teenager who fancies himself an expert surfer
- Jennifer Jason Leigh as Stacy Hamilton, a 15-year-old underclassman who works at Perry's Pizza
- Judge Reinhold as Brad Hamilton, Stacy's 18-year-old older brother who works entry-level jobs
- Robert Romanus as Mike Damone, a smooth-talking teenager who takes bets and scalps concert tickets
- Brian Backer as Mark "Rat" Ratner, Damone's best friend who works as an usher at the movie theater at Ridgemont Mall
- Phoebe Cates as Linda Barrett, Stacy’s 18-year-old best friend and her co-worker at Perry's Pizza
- Ray Walston as Mr. Hand, a history teacher at Ridgemont High that gets annoyed with Spicoli's antics
- Scott Thomson as Arnold, a friend of Brad's
- Vincent Schiavelli as Mr. Vargas, a science teacher at Ridgemont High who drank coffee and then Sanka
- Amanda Wyss as Lisa, Brad's girlfriend
- D. W. Brown as Ron Johnson, a stereo salesman
- Forest Whitaker as Charles Jefferson, a star football player at Ridgemont High
- Kelli Maroney as Cindy Carr
- Tom Nolan as Dennis Taylor, the manager of All-American Burger
- Blair Ashleigh as Pat Bernardo
- Eric Stoltz as one of Spicoli's stoner buds
- Stanley Davis Jr. as Jefferson's younger brother
- James Russo as a man who tries to rob Mi-T-Mart
- James Bershad as Greg Adams
- Nicolas Cage as one of Brad's buds, (Note: Despite being identified as Dave, he is just credited as "Brad's Bud") a friend of Brad and co-worker at All-American Burger (credited as Nicolas Coppola)
- Reginald H. Farmer as the vice-principal of Ridgemont High

Other minor appearances include:

- Anthony Edwards as one of Spicoli's stoner buds
- Pamela Springsteen as Dina Phillips
- Stuart Cornfeld as the Pirate King, the proprietor of "Captain Hook's Fish & Chips"
- Michael Wyle as one of Brad's Buds
- Sonny Carl Davis as an obnoxious customer who argues with Brad about his order, leading to Brad getting fired
- David E. Price as Desmond
- Patrick Brennan as Curtis Spicoli, Jeff's younger brother.
- Stu Nahan as himself
- Duane Tucker as Dr. Brandt
- Martin Brest as Dr. Miller
- Taylor Negron as the pizza deliveryman from the "Pizza Guy" restaurant who crashes Mr. Hand's class
- Nancy Wilson as a "Beautiful Girl In Car" who laughs at Brad's pirate costume
- Ellen Fenwick as Brad and Stacy's mother
- Lana Clarkson as Mrs. Vargas, wife of the science teacher
- Roy Holmer Wallac as a Mall Santa Claus
- Jason Bernard as the gym teacher (uncredited)
- Hallie Todd as Carrie Fraser (uncredited), a friend of Linda

== Production ==
=== Writing and development ===
The film is adapted from a book Cameron Crowe wrote after spending a year at Clairemont High School in San Diego, California. He went undercover to do research for his 1981 book, Fast Times at Ridgemont High: A True Story, about his observations of the high school and the students that he befriended there, including then-student Andy Rathbone, on whom the character Mark "Rat" Ratner was modeled.

Universal executives recommended David Lynch as a director, and Crowe met with Lynch. Though Lynch liked the idea, he passed on directing. Producer Art Linson showed Crowe's script to Amy Heckerling, who at that point had directed only student films. Heckerling then met with Crowe, and the two began brainstorming different ideas for the film. Heckerling thought the book "had just such an amazing wealth of material" that could be incorporated more into the script." She liked how much of the book's action is centered on a mall, and suggested featuring the mall setting even more prominently in the film. Said Crowe, "Amy completely got it and we were up and running."

=== Casting ===
Nicolas Cage made his feature-film debut, portraying an unnamed co-worker of Brad's at All-American Burger, credited as "Nicolas Coppola". Cage originally auditioned for the role of Brad Hamilton, but he was not cast due to his age. It was also the film debut for Eric Stoltz and provided early roles for Anthony Edwards and Forest Whitaker. Crowe's future wife, Nancy Wilson of Heart, has a cameo as the "Beautiful Girl in Car" who laughs at Brad in his Captain Hook uniform during a traffic-light stop.

Tom Hanks was considered for the role of Brad Hamilton. Justine Bateman was offered the role of Linda Barrett, but she turned it down to star in Family Ties. Matthew Broderick was offered the role of Jeff Spicoli, but he turned it down. Jodie Foster was considered for the role of Stacy Hamilton. Ally Sheedy, Meg Tilly, and Ralph Macchio also auditioned for roles but were not cast. Fred Gwynne was offered the role of Mr. Hand, but turned it down, as he felt that the script had "too much nasty stuff". In a scene in Spicoli's dream where he was originally going to be on The Tonight Show, Johnny Carson passed on a cameo appearance, as did Tom Snyder. Jennifer Jason Leigh stated that she prepared for the role of Stacy by rereading her own high school diaries and letters, as well as taking a job at the Sherman Oaks Galleria Perry's Pizza restaurant for three weeks.

=== Filming ===
Mall scenes were filmed at the Sherman Oaks Galleria after hours. Principal photography began on November 2, 1981, and lasted for a total of 8 weeks. Scenes at Ridgemont High School were filmed at Van Nuys High School.

Universal test-screened an early cut of the film in Orange County, California. Heckerling said feedback from audiences and the studio was worrying because "people were like, 'We teenagers are not like that,' 'You think all we care about is sex and drugs,' and blah, blah, blah. And we were worried that we would have to cut out a lot of stuff." However, producer Art Linson, who maintained that conservative audiences in Orange County were not the film's target audience, ensured that no major cuts or edits were made.

== Soundtrack ==
Professional ratings
Review scores
Source	Rating
AllMusic	4.5/5 stars

The soundtrack album Fast Times at Ridgemont High: Music from the Motion Picture was released by Elektra Records on July 30, 1982. It peaked at #54 on the US Billboard 200 album chart. The soundtrack features the work of many quintessential 1980s rock artists.

Several of the movie's songs were released as singles, including Jackson Browne's "Somebody's Baby", which reached #7 on the Billboard Hot 100 singles chart. Other singles were the title track by Sammy Hagar, a cover of The Tymes' "So Much in Love" by Timothy B. Schmit which reached #59 on the Billboard Hot 100 singles chart, "Raised on the Radio" by the Ravyns and "Waffle Stomp" by Joe Walsh. In addition to Schmit and Walsh, the album features solo tracks by other members of the Eagles: Don Henley and Don Felder. The soundtrack also included "I Don't Know (Spicoli's Theme)" by Jimmy Buffett and "Goodbye Goodbye" by Oingo Boingo (led by Danny Elfman).

Five tracks in the film not included on the soundtrack are "Moving in Stereo" by the Cars; "American Girl" by Tom Petty and the Heartbreakers; "We Got the Beat" by the Go Go's, which is the movie's opening theme; Led Zeppelin's "Kashmir"; and "Winter Wonderland" by Darlene Love. In addition, the live band at the prom dance during the end of the film played two songs also not on the soundtrack: The Eagles' "Life in the Fast Lane" and Sam the Sham's "Wooly Bully".

The Donna Summer track "Highway Runner", was recorded in 1981 for her double album titled I'm a Rainbow; however, the album was shelved by Geffen Records but ultimately released in 1996 by Mercury Records.

Todd Rundgren also recorded the song "Attitude" for the film at Crowe's request. It was not included in the film, but was released on Rundgren's Demos and Lost Albums in 2001. A track titled "Fast Times" was recorded by Heart but was not used in the film. The track ended up on their 1982 album Private Audition.

In some countries, the album was released as a single LP with 10 tracks.

Heckerling, in the DVD audio commentary, states that the 1970s artists, like the Eagles, were insisted upon inclusion in the film by one of the producers. Irving Azoff, one of the film's producers, was the personal manager for the Eagles and Stevie Nicks.

=== Track listing ===
Side one
No.	Title	Writer(s)	Performer	Length
1.	"Somebody's Baby"	Browne; Danny Kortchmar	Jackson Browne	4:05
2.	"Waffle Stomp"	Walsh	Joe Walsh	3:40
3.	"Love Rules"	Henley; Kortchmar	Don Henley	4:05
4.	"Uptown Boys"	Goffin; Janna Allen	Louise Goffin	2:45
5.	"So Much in Love"	George Williams; Bill Jackson; Roy Straigis	Timothy B. Schmit	2:25

Side two
No.	Title	Writer(s)	Performer	Length
6.	"Raised on the Radio"	Rob Fahey	Ravyns	3:43
7.	"The Look in Your Eyes"	Gerard McMahon	G Tom Mac	4:00
8.	"Speeding"	Jane Wiedlin; Charlotte Caffey	The Go-Go's	2:11
9.	"Don't Be Lonely"	Marv Ross	Quarterflash	3:18
10.	"Never Surrender"	Felder; Kenny Loggins	Don Felder	4:15

Side three
No.	Title	Writer(s)	Performer	Length
11.	"Fast Times (The Best Years of Our Lives)"	Squier	Billy Squier	3:41
12.	"Fast Times at Ridgemont High"	Hagar	Sammy Hagar	3:36
13.	"I Don't Know (Spicoli's Theme)"	Buffett; Michael Utley	Jimmy Buffett	3:00
14.	"Love Is the Reason"	Nash	Graham Nash	3:31
15.	"I'll Leave It Up to You"	Rusty Young	Poco	2:55

Side four
No.	Title	Writer(s)	Performer	Length
16.	"Highway Runner"	Giorgio Moroder; Summer	Donna Summer	3:18
17.	"Sleeping Angel"	Nicks	Stevie Nicks	4:43
18.	"She's My Baby (And She's Outta Control)"	Dave Palmer; Phil Jost	Palmer/Jost	2:53
19.	"Goodbye, Goodbye"	Danny Elfman	Oingo Boingo	4:34
Total length:				65:50

== Release ==
The film was initially given an X rating by the MPAA due to a protracted sex scene and brief male frontal nudity during the pool house scene. The original scene was longer, as Heckerling wanted to portray what she felt was the awkwardness of teen sexuality realistically, and with gender equality when it came to showing nudity, as X-rated films up to that point had mostly shown only nude women. To secure the R rating needed for commercial release, the sex was drastically shortened in editing, and Heckerling re-cropped the full-frontal male nude scene in question. Leigh expressed disappointment that the re-cut version "eliminated the sense of awkward hesitancy between the two characters".

Universal was not confident the film would be a box-office success and was considering shelving the film. Crowe said "What happened is somebody wrote a memo shortly before the [release]...to [Universal executives] Ned Tanen and Sid Sheinberg that said the future of the studio was in doubt if we are making movies like this high school movie." Tanen stood by releasing the film theatrically, and it was given a limited theatrical release. It was not given a big marketing push due to a lack of marquee names and concerns over its sexual content. Actor Judge Reinhold recalled, "We were really heartsick because somebody high up said, 'This is pornography, and there's no way that Universal's going to release [it]'. We didn't see it as this horny high school movie at all. We saw it as having the opportunity to do something authentic that was based on the actual experiences of the kids that Cameron chronicled for that whole year."

The film opened on August 13, 1982, playing in 498 theaters. Positive word-of-mouth, with audiences showing up to repeat viewings and quoting dialogue from the film, prompted the studio to expand the release.

=== Box office ===
On its opening weekend, the film earned $2.5 million. The release was widened to 713 theaters, earning $3.25 million. The film ranked 29th among U.S. releases in 1982, earning $27.1 million, six times its $4.5 million budget, and later gaining popularity through television and home video releases.

=== Home media ===
Fast Times at Ridgemont High was released to DVD on December 21, 1999. The DVD included audio commentary with Heckerling and Crowe, as well as the making-of documentary "Reliving Our Fast Times at Ridgemont High". It was released on Blu-ray on January 10, 2012. On May 11, 2021, a digitally restored 4K version was released on Blu-ray and DVD through The Criterion Collection. The Criterion release restores Heckerling's original cut of the film.

== Reception ==
=== Critical response ===
On the review aggregator website Rotten Tomatoes, 78% of 59 critics' reviews are positive, with an average rating of 7.0/10. The website's consensus reads, "While Fast Times at Ridgemont High features Sean Penn's legendary performance, the film endures because it accurately captured the small details of school, work, and teenage life." Metacritic, which uses a weighted average, assigned the film a score of 61 out of 100, based on 21 critics, indicating "generally favorable" reviews. Audiences polled by CinemaScore gave the film an average grade of "B+" on an A+ to F scale.

On its initial release, multiple critics dismissed the film as just the latest in a wave of teensploitation films such as Porky's and The Last American Virgin. Roger Ebert was highly critical of the film's vulgar humor and called it a "scuz-pit of a movie". Though he praised the performances of Leigh, Penn, Cates, and Reinhold, he lamented that Leigh's character is put through "humiliating" situations that he found degrading to young women. In later years, Ebert reevaluated his opinion of the film and became a big supporter of Cameron Crowe's directorial career. Richard Corliss of Time compared the film negatively to another teen coming-of-age movie, American Graffiti. Janet Maslin of The New York Times wrote that it was "a jumbled but appealing teen-age comedy with something of a fresh perspective on the subject."

In contrast, LA Weekly praised the film, particularly its screenplay, direction, and the performances of Leigh and Penn. The review read, "While neither as slapstick as Animal House, nor as apocalyptic and biting as Over the Edge, Fast Times at Ridgemont High is both serious and funny enough to hold its own in their company." The review added the film presents "a portrait of modern school life that speaks lightly but truly to the fears and trials of post-Watergate teens".

Speaking on earlier negative reactions to the film due to the sexual content, Heckerling said, "The whole theme, of even the title, is things are going too fast for young people. They shouldn't have to worry so much about sex at such an early age."

As time went on, however, the film was increasingly seen as a classic. In an essay written for the Criterion Collection edition in 2021, critic Dana Stevens wrote, "Fast Times is the polar opposite of exploitation. Deep in its horny heart, this is the story of one fifteen-year-old girl's clumsy and sometimes painful introduction to the world of sex, related without judgment or preconception or the least hint of sentimentalization. Heckerling's film is a raunchy crowd-pleaser replete with stoner humor, a masturbation gag, and a blow-job tutorial that makes use of school-cafeteria carrots. But it is also attuned to the emotional lives of teenagers—girls and boys—in ways that place it far ahead of its time."

In Collider, Grace Neave noted that in teen comedy films like Porky's, the women are typically objectified and are chased by the male characters; however, in Fast Times, Stacy and Linda are fully formed characters that also pursue the guys. Neaves added that unlike most teen comedies of its time, which tended to "encourage misogyny as a comical gag", "Stacy's enthusiasm about sex is never shamed or used as a plot point to cast judgment over her character."

Fast Times has also received praise for its realistic depiction of the abortion scene, foregoing judgement or moralizing about the act itself and instead focusing on Damone's failure to support Stacy. Of Heckerling's decision to depict the scene, Crowe later said, "She said 'you know what, this is life. I want to shoot this like life.' She just quietly did it, and in an almost European way, she put this young girl's life onscreen in a way for you to judge—this is just how life is. And it meant a lot when she did it at the time, and it still means a lot. It was a very courageous thing to do, and it actually is the one thing about the movie that I'm probably happiest about at this point."

For the film's 40th anniversary in 2022, critic Richard Roeper said that out of all the raunchy teen comedies of the 1980s, Fast Times "continues to resonate as a substantial time capsule of the period, capturing the music, the fashions, the attitudes and the social mores of the time", and called it "the best ribald teen comedy ever made."

=== Accolades ===
Crowe's screenplay was nominated for a WGA Award for Best Comedy Adapted from Another Medium. The film ranks No. 15 on Bravo's "100 Funniest Movies" and No. 2 on Entertainment Weekly's list of the "50 Best High School Movies".

The film is recognized by American Film Institute in these lists:

- 2000: AFI's 100 Years...100 Laughs – #87

National Film Preservation Board

- 2005: National Film Registry, Fast Times at Ridgemont High

== Legacy ==
=== Television spin-off ===
The film inspired a short-lived 1986 television series titled Fast Times. Ray Walston and Vincent Schiavelli reprised their roles as Hand and Vargas on the show. Other characters from the movie were played by different actors, most notably Patrick Dempsey as Mike Damone.

=== 2020 table read ===
During the COVID-19 pandemic, as a fundraiser for CORE (Community Organized Relief Effort), a nonprofit charity co-founded by Sean Penn, a table read was organized for the film that Penn was involved in. After the table read, Cameron Crowe and Amy Heckerling hosted a discussion about the film.

- Brad Pitt as Brad
- Jennifer Aniston as Linda
- Julia Roberts as Stacy
- Matthew McConaughey as Mike Damone
- Shia LaBeouf as Spicoli
- Dane Cook as Mark
- Henry Golding as Mr. Vargas
- John Legend as Charles Jefferson and Jefferson's brother
- Ray Liotta as Mr. Hand
- Jimmy Kimmel as various roles
- Sean Penn as Pizza guy
- Morgan Freeman as the narrator

== See also ==
- Fast Times at Barrington High, an album by the band The Academy Is..., is a play on the title of the film.
- "Fast Times at Buddy Cianci Jr. High", a Family Guy episode from Season 4.
- Fast Times at Fairmont High, a novella by Vernor Vinge, is named in reference to the film.
- "Stacy's Mom", a song by Fountains of Wayne which pays homage to the film.
- The Last American Virgin, a remake of Lemon Popsicle and a film released in the same year with similar themes.
- "Phoebe Cates" from the album Lechuza, a song by the band Fenix TX about Phoebe Cates' role in the film.
- "Fast Times at Clairemont High", a song by Pierce the Veil, off of their 2010 album Selfish Machines, is also a play on the title of the film.
