= World in Motion (Jackson Browne album) =

Studio album by Jackson Browne
- Released: June 6, 1989
- Recorded: 1988
- Studios: Groove Masters (Santa Monica, California); The Power Station (New York City, New York); Island (London, UK); Studio Devout, Paris
- Genre: Rock
- Length: 46:52
- Label: Elektra
- Producers: Jackson Browne; Scott Thurston

Jackson Browne chronology
Lives in the Balance (1986)	World in Motion (1989)	I'm Alive (1993)

Singles from World in Motion
- 1. "World in Motion" Released: 1989; 2. "Chasing You Into the Light" Released: 1989; 3. "Anything Can Happen" Released: 1989

World in Motion is the ninth album by American singer-songwriter Jackson Browne, released in 1989 (see 1989 in music). It peaked at number 45 on The Billboard 200 and was Browne's first album that did not obtain either gold or platinum status. The album took three years to complete and makes statements about nuclear disarmament and the "secret" government that brought forth Oliver North and the Iran-Contra scandal.

== Background ==
Similar to his previous album Lives in the Balance, Browne continued to include political themes within his songs on World in Motion, which generally centered around criticism of foreign policy of the Reagan administration. It also featured several musicians, including Walfredo Reyes Jr., who was credited with drums on "Anything Can Happen". Reyes recorded his drum part during the spring of 1988. At the time, the song consisted of a percussion track played by Russ Kunkel that included a cabasa, claves, handclaps, and some rhythm programming, along with guitar, bass, and vocals. Upon completing his original drum take, Reyes insisted on recording a second pass, which Browne initially resisted, believing that Reyes' original interpretation of the song was satisfactory. He later relented after Reyes explained that he wanted to punctuate one of the sections with an accent, so Reyes punched in roughly 75 percent through the song and played through the end. Browne was dissatisfied with the original cabasa part, so he contacted Alex Acuña to re-record it.

== Reception ==
Professional ratings
Review scores
Source	Rating
AllMusic	2/5 stars
Robert Christgau	B
The Encyclopedia of Popular Music	2/5 stars
Rolling Stone Record Guide	2.5/5 stars

The critical reviews of World in Motion were lukewarm. Music critic William Rulhmann wrote "Except for the gloomy viewpoint, it was hard to recognize the Jackson Browne of his first few albums amid all the commentary, and even if you agreed with his overall political stance, that was disappointing." Critic Robert Christgau commented that the best songs were the ones Browne did not write. Rolling Stone wrote, "Steven Van Zandt's 'I Am a Patriot' is the only truly memorable song on Browne's trilogy of protest albums."

Cash Box said of the title track that "Hackneyed late-'80s production (by Scott Thurston and the artist) and a way too literal political lyric ('Sun going down on the USA,' it starts out) make this AOR emphasis track a struggle to sit through, despite the warming presence of Bonnie Raitt."

== Track listing ==
All tracks composed by Browne except where noted:

1. "World in Motion" (Browne, Craig Doerge) – 4:24
2. "Enough of the Night" – 4:54
3. "Chasing You into the Light" – 4:16
4. "How Long" – 6:10
5. "Anything Can Happen" – 5:05
6. "When the Stone Begins to Turn" – 4:48
7. "The Word Justice" (Browne, Scott Thurston) – 4:18
8. "My Personal Revenge" (Tomás Borge, Luis Enrique Mejía Godoy, translation by Jorge Calderón) – 4:02
9. "I Am a Patriot" (Steven Van Zandt) – 4:02
10. "Lights and Virtues" – 4:53

== Personnel ==
- Jackson Browne – lead vocals, slide guitar (1), resonator guitar (1), acoustic piano (2, 5, 7), baritone guitar (3, 10), keyboards (4), drum programming (4)
- Craig Doerge – keyboards (1, 4)
- Ray Lema – keyboards (6), harmony vocals (6)
- Doug Haywood – harmony vocals (1, 6, 9), keyboards (7), organ (9)
- Kevin Dukes – guitars (1, 2, 5–7, 9, 10), acoustic guitar (3, 8), electric guitar (8)
- David Lindley – lap steel guitar (4)
- Yves N'Djock – guitars (6)
- Jorge Strunz – acoustic gut-string guitar (8)
- Hugo Pedroza – charango (8), tiple (8)
- Scott Thurston – bass guitar (1, 7, 10), harmony vocals (1, 2, 6, 7, 9), keyboards (2–8, 10), guitars (5), guitar solo (8)
- Bob Glaub – bass guitar (2–4, 8, 9), guitars (7)
- Robbie Shakespeare – bass guitar (6)
- Michael Jochum – drums (1–3, 7–10), tom tom (6)
- Russ Kunkel – drums (4), drum programming (5)
- Walfredo Reyes, Jr. – drums (5)
- Sly Dunbar – drums (6)
- Alex Acuña – percussion (2, 5)
- Brice Wouassy – percussion (6)
- Bonnie Raitt – harmony vocals (1)
- Lori B. Williams – harmony vocals (1, 2, 6, 9)
- Djene Doumbouya – harmony vocals (6)
- Brinsley Forde – harmony vocals (6)
- Tony Gad – harmony vocals (6)
- Drummie Zeb – harmony vocals (6)
- Salif Keita – Malian vocals (6)
- David Crosby – harmony vocals (7)

== Production ==
- Producers – Jackson Browne and Scott Thurston
- Engineers – James Geddes (Tracks 1–5 & 7–10); Paul Smykle (Track 6).
- Additional Engineers – Terry Becker, Jim Nipar and David Tickle (Tracks 1–5 & 7–10); Phillippe Boisse and Roy Hendrickson (Track 6).
- Assistant Engineers – Scott Blockland (Tracks 1–5 & 7–10); Ingmar Kiang (Track 6).
- Technical Engineer – Ed Wong
- Mixed by David Tickle at Groove Masters (Santa Monica, California)
- Mastered by Doug Sax at The Mastering Lab (Hollywood, California).
- Production Assistant – Bill Irvin
- Art Direction and Design – Dawn Patrol and Jimmy Wachtel
- Photography – Annie Leibovitz
- Paintings – Francisco Letelier

== Charts ==
Chart (1989)	Peak position
Canada Top Albums/CDs (RPM)	82
Dutch Albums (Album Top 100)	76
German Albums (Offizielle Top 100)	56
Swedish Albums (Sverigetopplistan)	12
UK Albums (Official Charts)	39
US Billboard 200	45

Singles – Billboard (United States)

Year	Single	Chart	Position
1989	"Anything Can Happen"	Adult Contemporary	23
1989	"Chasing You into the Light"	Mainstream Rock Tracks	9
1989	"World in Motion"	Mainstream Rock Tracks	4
