= For Everyman =

Studio album by Jackson Browne
- Released: October 1973
- Recorded: 1973
- Studios: Sunset Sound (Hollywood); Wally Heider's Studio 3 (Hollywood)
- Genre: Rock
- Length: 41:13
- Label: Asylum
- Producer: Jackson Browne

Jackson Browne chronology
Jackson Browne (1972)	For Everyman (1973)	Late for the Sky (1974)

Singles from For Everyman
- 1. "Redneck Friend" Released: September 1973; 2. "Take It Easy" Released: 1973

For Everyman is the second album by American singer-songwriter Jackson Browne, released in 1973 (see 1973 in music). The album peaked at number 43 on the Billboard 200 chart and the single "Redneck Friend" reached number 85 on the Billboard Hot 100 chart. In 2012, the album was ranked number 450 on Rolling Stone magazine's list of The 500 Greatest Albums of All Time.

== History ==
For Everyman marked the debut of multi-instrumentalist David Lindley's long association with Browne. Guest artists included David Crosby (harmony on the title track), Glenn Frey (harmony on "Redneck Friend"), Elton John (credited as Rockaday Johnnie, piano on "Redneck Friend"), Don Henley (harmony on "Colors of the Sun"), Joni Mitchell, and Bonnie Raitt.

The title track was written by Browne in response to the apocalyptic "Wooden Ships", a song written by Crosby, Stephen Stills and Paul Kantner. His own version of "These Days" appears here after having been previously recorded by Nico, Tom Rush, who also covered "Colors of the Sun", and Gregg Allman. Nico was the first to record the song in 1967. Browne later commented "When [Allman] did [These Days] I thought that he really unlocked a power in that song that I sort of then emulated in my version. I started playing the piano. I wasn't trying to sing it like Gregg; I couldn't possibly. I took the cue, playin' this slow walk. But it was written very sort of, kind of a little more flatpicking." "Take It Easy" was written by Browne and Frey and became the Eagles' first single, released on May 1, 1972.

For Everyman was certified as a Gold record in 1975 and Platinum in 1989 by the RIAA.

The album cover photograph is a depiction of Browne's childhood home in Highland Park, California, Abbey San Encino, which was hand-built by his grandfather Clyde Browne and owned to this day by his brother Edward. The photograph was taken by Alan F. Blumenthal. The cover of the original release was a cutout with the inner sleeve showing Browne sitting in a rocking chair. When removed the picture on the inside had the same background but Browne and the rocking chair were omitted.

== Reception ==
Professional ratings
Review scores
Source	Rating
AllMusic	4.5/5 stars
Christgau's Record Guide	B
The Encyclopedia of Popular Music	4/5 stars

In her November 1973 review in Rolling Stone, Janet Maslin wrote that "for inwardly panoramic songwriting of an apocalyptic bent, Jackson Browne's second album is rivaled only by his first (the second one wins), and Jackson himself is rivaled by nobody," adding that "his work is a unique fusion of West Coast casualness and East Coast paranoia, easygoing slang and painstaking precision, child's-eye romanticizing and adult's-eye acceptance." Mostly complimentary throughout, she noted that his singing had improved since the first album, and consciously reviews the album by placing it squarely within the context of the times: "Jackson's concerns, even more than his genius for rendering them simultaneously intimate and universal, are the basis for the album's unique strengths. He stands alone as a composite of ambivalence about maturity, weariness of the race, fear that love may not be enough ... confusion over whether or not a lasting home can be found in a progressively nightmarish world. He also stands alone as someone who, resigned to all that, is still willing to seek out some quiet way of weathering his time's new trials. Brilliantly conceived, incomparably immediate, For Everyman truly earns its title."

Acknowledging that Browne had a large task ahead of him in following his debut Jackson Browne in his review for AllMusic, William Ruhlmann claimed Browne "turned to some of his secondary older material, which was still better than most people's best and, ironically, more accessible..." and summarized the album as a "less consistent collection than Browne's debut album. But Browne's songwriting ability remained impressive."

In a 1999 Rolling Stone review, Anthony DeCurtis claimed the album as uneven and that "Browne is still searching for his true voice on For Everyman. Is he the genial rogue of 'Red Neck Friend' or the mystical dreamer of 'Our Lady of the Well'? He will find that voice the following year on his masterpiece, Late for the Sky. But on For Everyman, he was testing his various talents with obvious joy, because, like his audience, he was just discovering them."

Music critic Robert Christgau gave the album a B grade, writing "Even as he lists toward the pretentious and the vague, the reflective evenness of Browne's delivery sets up an expectation of cogency that on this album is satisfied only by such relatively unambitious songs as 'These Days,' 'Red Neck Friend,' and the charming 'Ready or Not.' Which save it for me."

Cash Box called "Ready or Not" a "catchy autobiographical sketch of life on the road" whose "story line is an intriguing romance with humorous overtones" and said the song had "excellent balance and instrumentation." Record World called it a "nifty self-produced number that features good country-tinged instrumental work behind [Browns's] ear-catching vocalizing" and that "straightforward lyrics follow a solid melody line."

== Track listing ==
All tracks are written by Jackson Browne except where noted.

Side one

1. "Take It Easy" (Browne, Glenn Frey) – 3:39
2. "Our Lady of the Well" – 3:51
3. "Colors of the Sun" – 4:26
4. "I Thought I Was a Child" – 3:43
5. "These Days" – 4:41

Side two

1. "Redneck Friend" – 3:56
2. "The Times You've Come" – 3:39
3. "Ready or Not" – 3:33
4. "Sing My Songs to Me" – 3:25
5. "For Everyman" – 6:20

== Personnel ==
- Jackson Browne – vocals, acoustic guitar (1, 2, 5, 7, 10), acoustic piano (3, 8, 9), rhythm guitar (6)
- David Lindley – electric guitar (1, 9, 10), acoustic guitar (2, 3, 4, 7, 10), slide guitar (5, 6), electric fiddle (8)
- Spooner Oldham – Hammond organ (3)
- Bill Payne – acoustic piano (4)
- David Paich – acoustic piano (5)
- Elton John – acoustic piano (6) [credited as Rockaday Johnnie]
- Joni Mitchell – electric piano (9)
- Mike Utley – Hammond organ (9, 10)
- Craig Doerge – acoustic piano (10)
- Sneaky Pete Kleinow – pedal steel guitar (1, 2)
- Doug Haywood – bass (1–6, 8), harmony vocals (1, 2, 5, 8)
- Leland Sklar – bass (7, 10)
- Wilton Felder – bass (9)
- Mickey McGee – drums (1)
- Jim Keltner – drums (2, 4, 5, 6, 8)
- Gary Mallaber – drums (3, 9)
- Russ Kunkel – drums (7, 10)
- Don Henley – harmony vocals (3)
- Glenn Frey – harmony vocals (6)
- Bonnie Raitt – harmony vocals (7)
- David Crosby – harmony vocals (10)

Production

- Jackson Browne – producer
- John Haeny – engineer
- Al Schmitt – engineer, mixing
- Kent Nebergall – assistant engineer
- Rick Tarantini – assistant engineer
- Greg Ladanyi – mastering
- Anthony Hudson – art direction, design
- Alan F. Blumenthal – photography

== Charts ==
=== Weekly charts ===
Chart (1974)	Peak position
Canada Top Albums/CDs (RPM)	68
US Billboard 200	43

=== Year-end charts ===
Chart (1974)	Position
US Billboard 200	74

Singles – Billboard (United States)

Year	Single	Chart	Position
1973	"Redneck Friend"	Pop Singles	85
