= Take It Easy =

1972 single by the Eagles

Single by Eagles

from the album Eagles
- B-side: "Get You in the Mood"
- Released: May 1, 1972
- Studio: Olympic Sound Studios (London)
- Genre: Country rock; folk-pop; folk rock
- Length: 3:30
- Label: Asylum
- Songwriters: Jackson Browne; Glenn Frey
- Producer: Glyn Johns

Eagles singles chronology
"Take It Easy" (1972)	"Witchy Woman" (1972)

"Take It Easy"

Single by Jackson Browne

from the album For Everyman
- B-side: "Ready or Not"
- Released: 1973
- Genre: Country rock; folk rock
- Length: 3:39
- Label: Asylum
- Songwriters: Jackson Browne; Glenn Frey
- Producer: Glyn Johns

Jackson Browne singles chronology
"Redneck Friend" (1973)	"Take It Easy" (1973)	"Walking Slow" (1974)

"Take It Easy" is the debut single by the American rock band Eagles, written by Jackson Browne and Eagles band member Glenn Frey, who also provides lead vocals. It was released on May 1, 1972, and peaked at No. 12 on the Billboard Hot 100 chart on July 22, 1972. It was also the opening track of the band's eponymous debut album and has become one of their signature songs, included on all of their live and compilation albums. It is listed as one of The Rock and Roll Hall of Fame's 500 Songs that Shaped Rock and Roll.

Jackson Browne later recorded the song as the lead track on his second album, For Everyman (1973), and also released it as a single, although it did not chart. Travis Tritt also covered the song for the 1993 Eagles' tribute album Common Thread: The Songs of the Eagles; the video for Tritt's version is notable for the appearance of all five members of the Eagles together again for the first time in 13 years after their break-up, and it led to the reunion of the band a few months later.

== History ==
=== Composition ===
Jackson Browne originally began writing "Take It Easy" in 1971 for his own eponymous debut album but was having difficulty finishing the song. Browne's friend Glenn Frey – who lived in the same Echo Park, California, apartment building as Browne – had heard an early version and later asked Browne about it. Browne then played the unfinished second verse that begins with "Well, I'm a-standin' on a corner in Winslow, Arizona...", and Frey finished the verse with "Such a fine sight to see. It's a girl, my lord, in a flatbed Ford, slowin' down to take a look at me." Browne was very happy with the result and suggested that they finish the song together. The resulting song became the first track on the Eagles' debut album and was released as their first single.

Browne told a version of the story in a radio interview: "I knew Glenn Frey from playing these clubs – we kept showing up at the same clubs and singing on the open-mic nights. Glenn happened to come by to say 'hi,' and to hang around when I was in the studio, and I showed him the beginnings of that song, and he asked if I was going to put it on my record and I said it wouldn't be ready in time. He said 'well, we'll put it on, we'll do it,' 'cause he liked it," Browne explained. "But it wasn't finished, and he kept after me to finish it, and finally offered to finish it himself. And after a couple of times when I declined to have him finish my song, I said, 'all right.' I finally thought, 'This is ridiculous. Go ahead and finish it. Do it.' And he finished it in spectacular fashion. And, what's more, arranged it in a way that was far superior to what I had written."

=== Recordings ===
Eagles - "Take It Easy"
The second verse of the Eagles' recording with Glenn Frey on lead vocals. Randy Meisner sings harmony at the beginning, with the rest of the band joining in towards the end of this clip.

The song was recorded at the Olympic Studios in London with producer Glyn Johns. Glenn Frey sings the lead vocal on the Eagles recording of "Take It Easy". Bass player Randy Meisner sings the harmony vocal in the second verse with Frey, with drummer Don Henley harmonizing in the chorus, on the line "Though we will never be here again. So open up, I'm climbin' in." Bernie Leadon provides the lead guitar and distinctive banjo parts, as well as harmony vocals. The track's producer Johns said: "On 'Take It Easy' I got Bernie to play double-time banjo; they all thought it was a bonkers idea but it worked. It was already a great song, but that one little thing made it different."

In their early live performances, the Eagles start with an a cappella version of a verse from "Silver Dagger" that begins with "My daddy is a handsome devil..." as an intro to "Take It Easy".

Jackson Browne recorded a version for his 1973 album For Everyman. Sneaky Pete Kleinow plays pedal steel and David Lindley (on electric guitar) teams up with Browne. Mickey McGee's percussion and the other instruments crossfade into the next track on the album, "Our Lady of the Well."

"Nightingale" was originally going to be the non-LP B-side to "Take It Easy". By adding the Henley sung "Nightingale" to the album track list, the Frey-sung track "Get You in the Mood" was then dropped from the track listing and was made the non-LP B-side for the first single. This gave Frey three lead vocals instead of four on the final album and Henley two.

== Reception ==
=== Critical ===
In 1972, Bud Scoppa wrote in Rolling Stone in his review of the Eagles' debut album that "Take it Easy" was "simply the best sounding rock single to come out so far this year. The first time through, you could tell it had everything: danceable rhythm, catchy, winding melody, intelligent, affirmative lyrics, a progressively powerful arrangement mixing electric guitar and banjo, and a crisp vocal, with vibrant four-part harmony at just the right moments for maximum dramatic effect." Cash Box felt it sounded somewhat like the Byrds and predicted that it would be a "sure and rapid-fire smash."

On Allmusic.com, William Ruhlmann said that Browne wrote the song in 1971 while working on his debut album, and that "it encapsulated many of the usual themes of his work, touching on the road, women, love as salvation, and an ambivalent sense of fatalism." Discussing the specific lyrics, Ruhlmann goes on: "The opening verse was a joke. The narrator says he is running down the road with seven women on his mind. But this vision of promiscuity is quickly dispelled. Of the seven, four want to own him, two want to stone him, and one just wants to be his friend. The verse introduces the song's point, that, despite troubles, one should 'take it easy.'" Ruhlmann points out that Frey's added verse "lightened the song's mood considerably. Now, the narrator was standing on a corner in Winslow, Arizona, being eyed by a woman in a truck (flatbed Ford) who slowed down to give him the once-over. These unabashedly vain lines weren't exactly consistent with Browne's theme, but they made it sound like the singer really did want to take it easy."

"Take It Easy" has retrospectively been regarded as one of the Eagles' best songs. In 2017, Billboard ranked the song number three on their list of the 15 greatest Eagles songs, and in 2019, Rolling Stone ranked the song number two on their list of the 40 greatest Eagles songs.

Classic Rock History critic Brian Kachejian rated "Take It Easy" as Browne's 2nd greatest song, even though it is mostly associated with the Eagles.

=== Commercial ===
The song was released as the first single of the Eagles in May 1972, and entered the Billboard Hot 100 at No. 79 on the chart date of June 3, 1972. It stayed for 11 weeks on the chart that summer, peaked at No. 12 on the U.S. Billboard Hot 100 on July 22, 1972. It also peaked at No. 12 the same week on the Easy listening chart (later known as Adult contemporary), a chart it first entered at No. 40 on June 17, 1972.

== Winslow, Arizona ==
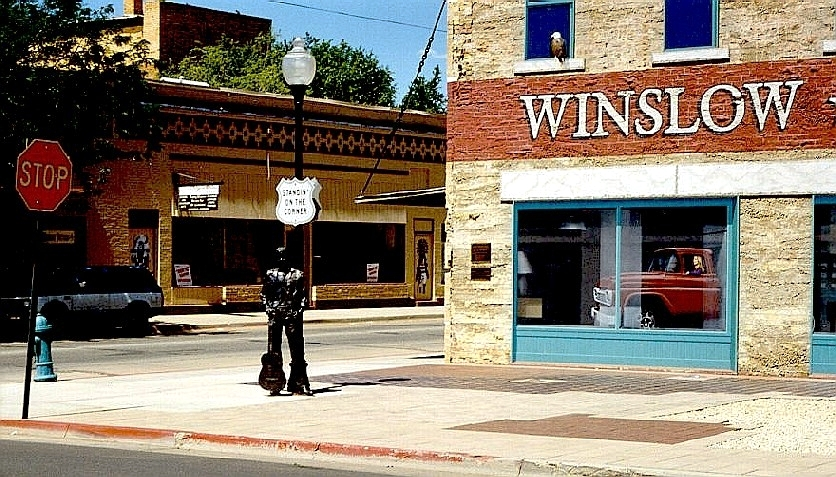
The "Take It Easy" statue created by Ron Adamson of Libby, Montana, and mural at 35°1'25" N, 110°41'53" W at Second St. & Kinsley Ave. in Winslow, Arizona

According to Frey, the second verse of "Take It Easy" refers to a time when Jackson Browne's automobile malfunctioned in Winslow, Arizona, during one of his trips to Sedona, requiring him to spend a long day in Winslow. In 1999, responding to the lyrics that made it famous, the city of Winslow erected a life-size bronze statue and mural commemorating the song at the Standin' on the Corner Park. The statue stands near a lamp post, the male figure securing an acoustic guitar between his right hand and the shoe of his right foot. Above his head, a metal sign, crafted in the style of U.S. Route shields, displays the words "Standin' on the corner". The trompe-l'œil mural on the wall behind the statue is that of a storefront, and includes what would appear to be the reflection of a red flatbed Ford pickup truck driven by a blonde-haired woman. The second floor of the mural features an eagle perched in one window on the left and a man and woman (apparently the man on the corner and woman in the truck) embracing in the third window on the right (not shown in the accompanying image). The site has become a landmark that attracted many visitors to the town.

There has, however, been some confusion about the location of original incident that inspired the story in the lyrics. In an interview with Matthew Ziegler, Browne related that it took place in Flagstaff, Arizona, at the Wienerschnitzel (now the Dog Haus) at the corner of East Rte. 66 and Switzer Canyon. According to Browne, a young woman cruised by in a Toyota pickup and looked at him and the image stuck with him. Browne had told Frey about the woman in the truck, and Frey then used the incident to add the line about the woman to the song. Browne, however, also stated in an interview with Los Angeles Times that it was always Winslow where his automobile had malfunctioned, although "the image of that girl driving a truck was an image that came from east" (i.e., East Flagstaff). The lines are therefore an amalgamation of two different events.

On September 24, 2016, a life-sized tribute statue to Glenn Frey was added to the Standin' on the Corner Park in Winslow, Arizona, to honor his songwriting contributions to "Take It Easy". Funds for the new statue, which depicted Frey as he appeared in the 1970s, were raised by "Mark & NeanderPaul" (Mark Devine & Paul Marshall), the morning show from Phoenix classic rock station 100.7 KSLX, the city of Winslow, and the Standin' on the Corner Foundation.

== Personnel ==
- Glenn Frey – lead vocals, acoustic rhythm guitar
- Bernie Leadon – harmony and backing vocals, lead guitar, banjo
- Randy Meisner – harmony and backing vocals, bass
- Don Henley – harmony and backing vocals, drums

== Travis Tritt version ==
"Take It Easy"

Single by Travis Tritt

from the album Common Thread: The Songs of the Eagles
- B-side: "I Wish I Could Go Back Home"
- Released: 1994
- Genre: Country
- Length: 3:32
- Label: Giant
- Songwriters: Jackson Browne; Glenn Frey
- Producer: James Stroud

Travis Tritt singles chronology
"Worth Every Mile" (1993)	"Take It Easy" (1994)	"Foolish Pride" (1994)

Travis Tritt recorded a version for the Eagles tribute album Common Thread: The Songs of the Eagles, which featured country music artists who were raised on the Eagles' music. On Tritt's version, Bernie Leadon's lead guitar parts were rearranged and performed by Dann Huff. The song was released as a single in 1994, and peaked at number 21 on the Billboard country music charts.

Tritt made a request for members of the Eagles to appear in his video for the song, and the resulting video for Tritt's version featured the Eagles lineup from 1978 to 1980 (Don Henley, Glenn Frey, Don Felder, Joe Walsh and Timothy B. Schmit) playing billiards in a local tavern and performing as its house band. Frey, who had previously been reluctant to reunite with the band, later said: "After years passed, you really sort of remember that you were friends first ... I just remembered how much we genuinely had liked each other and how much fun we'd had." Frey and Henley subsequently met with their management over lunch two months after the filming of the video and agreed to the reunion of Eagles. A new album, Hell Freezes Over, was released and a tour launched the following year.

== Charts ==
=== Eagles ===
Chart (1972–2016)	Peak position
Canada Top Singles (RPM)	8
US Billboard Hot 100	12
US Adult Contemporary (Billboard)	12
US Hot Rock & Alternative Songs (Billboard)	20
South Africa (Springbok Radio)	16

=== Travis Tritt ===
Chart (1994)	Peak position
Canada Country Singles (RPM)	12
US Hot Country Songs (Billboard)	21

== Certifications ==
Region	Certification	Certified units/sales
New Zealand (RMNZ)	7× Platinum	210,000^{‡}
United Kingdom (BPI)	Platinum	600,000^{‡}
^{‡} Sales+streaming figures based on certification alone.
