= For America =

1986 single by Jackson Browne

- 7-inch picture sleeve

Single by Jackson Browne

from the album Lives in the Balance
- B-side: "Till I Go Down"
- Released: February 1986
- Recorded: 1985
- Genre: Rock
- Length: 5:13
- Label: Asylum
- Songwriter: Jackson Browne
- Producer: Jackson Browne

Jackson Browne singles chronology
"Cut It Away" (1984)	"For America" (1986)	"In the Shape of a Heart" (1986)

"For America" is a song written and performed by American singer-songwriter Jackson Browne from his 1986 album Lives in the Balance. Released as the first single from the album, it reached No. 30 on the Billboard Hot 100 chart, spending 12 weeks on that chart after debuting at No. 72, and peaked at No. 3 on the Mainstream Rock chart, making it his last top 40 hit in the United States. It was also released as a single in the United Kingdom, as an EP in Germany, and as a promotional issue in Spain and Japan. A Statue of Liberty-shaped vinyl picture disc single was also released by Asylum in 1986, manufactured in the United Kingdom.

== History ==
Although concern with the state of the world has always been found in Browne's lyrics ("Doctor, My Eyes", "For Everyman"), the more specifically referenced socio-political awareness of the previous album's lead single "Lawyers in Love" became even more overt and political in "For America" (the title of which seems to deliberately link the song to two of Browne's earlier "eulogy" songs, "For a Dancer" and "For a Rocker").

I was made for America
It's in my blood and in my bones
By the dawn's early light / by all I know is right —
We're gonna reap what we have sown.

And the album from which it came, Lives in the Balance, is seen as his first overall "political" album, so critical reaction to the song reflected a perception of this movement in Browne's lyrical themes toward more specific and biting lines in "sharply etched political songs (that) question cultural imperialism, foreign policy and the current state of the American Dream:'"

The thing I wonder about the Dads and Moms —
Who send their sons to the Vietnams —
Will they really think their way of life
Has been protected as the next war comes?

"When Browne sings in 'For America' of how he used to retreat into "the safety of my own head," he isn't kidding," wrote Jimmy Guterman in a 1986 Rolling Stone review of the album, but now Browne opens his new album with a song, "both a prayer and a love song, which damns 'a generation's blank stare.'" Critiquing the musical and production aesthetics, Guterman complains "a gratuitous Clarence Clemons-derived sax riff that mars 'For America' distracts the listener.

The "first single, 'For America', is indicative of the collection's tone – staunchly anti-war and embittered by the sense of ironic betrayal that characterized political songwriting during the Nixon years," noted Billboard magazine upon the song's release.

== Reception ==
Cash Box called it a "penetrating look at American values and politics [that] stands as a mid-decade call for honesty and self-evaluation."

== Chart positions ==
Chart (1986)	Peak position
U.S. Billboard Hot 100	30
U.S. Billboard Top Rock Tracks	3
Canada Top 50 Singles (RPM)	90
