= Standing in the Breach =

Studio album by Jackson Browne
- Released: October 7, 2014
- Recorded: 2013–2014
- Studio: Groove Masters, Santa Monica; Apogee Studios, Santa Monica
- Genre: Rock
- Length: 55:07
- Label: Inside
- Producer: Jackson Browne and Paul Dieter

Jackson Browne chronology
Love Is Strange: En Vivo Con Tino (2010)	Standing in the Breach (2014)	Downhill from Everywhere (2021)

Singles from Standing in the Breach
- 1. "The Birds of St. Marks" Released: 2014

Standing in the Breach is the fourteenth studio album by American singer-songwriter Jackson Browne. It was released on October 7, 2014, by Inside Recordings and was his first album of new material in six years.

Professional ratings
Aggregate scores
Source	Rating
Metacritic	71/100
Review scores
Source	Rating
AllMusic	3.5/5 stars
PopMatters	7/10
Rolling Stone	4/5 stars

== Track listing ==
All tracks composed by Jackson Browne except where noted. Lyrics available at Jackson Browne's website.

1. "The Birds of St. Marks" – 4:23
2. "Yeah Yeah" – 6:15
3. "The Long Way Around" – 6:26
4. "Leaving Winslow" – 3:53
5. "If I Could Be Anywhere" – 7:08
6. "You Know the Night" (words: Woody Guthrie; music: Jackson Browne, Rob Wasserman) – 5:32
7. "Walls and Doors" (Carlos Varela; English translation by Jackson Browne) – 6:02
8. "Which Side" – 6:38
9. "Standing in the Breach" – 5:37
10. "Here" – 4:26

== Personnel ==
- Jackson Browne – lead vocals, acoustic guitar (1, 3, 5, 6, 10), acoustic piano (2, 3, 5, 9), electric rhythm guitar (4, 8)
- Benmont Tench – acoustic piano (5), Hammond organ (5)
- Aldo López-Gavilán – acoustic piano (7)
- Jeff Young – Hammond organ (8)
- Mike Thompson – Hammond organ (9)
- Greg Leisz – 12-string electric guitar (1), electric baritone guitar (2), tenor acoustic guitar (3), pedal steel guitar (4), lap steel guitar (6, 8, 10), acoustic guitar (9)
- Val McCallum – electric guitar (1–7, 9), harmony vocals (1, 4, 6, 8), electric baritone guitar (8)
- Carlos Varela – acoustic guitar (7), ending vocals (7)
- Mark Goldenberg – electric guitar (10)
- Bob Glaub – bass (1, 4, 8, 9)
- Taylor Goldsmith bass (2), harmony vocals (2)
- Alex Al – bass (3)
- Tal Wilkenfeld – bass (5)
- Sebastian Steinberg – bass (6)
- Julio César González – bass (7)
- Kevin McCormick – bass (10)
- Don Heffington – drums (1, 6)
- Griffin Goldsmith – drums (2), tambourine (2), harmony vocals (2)
- David Goodstein – drum loop (3)
- Mauricio Lewak – drum fills (3), drums (4, 7, 9, 10)
- Jay Bellerose – snare drum (3), tambourine (3), cymbal (3), percussion (5, 9)
- Jim Keltner – drums (5)
- Pete Thomas – drums (8)
- Luis Conte – udu (5), tambourine (5), djembe (7), shaker (7)
- Kipp Lennon – harmony vocals (1)
- Chavonne Stewart – harmony vocals (3, 5, 8)
- Alethea Mills – harmony vocals (5, 8)
- Doug Haywood – harmony vocals (6)
- Jonathan Wilson – harmony vocals (10)

== Production ==
- Jackson Browne – producer
- Paul Dieter – producer, recording, mixing
- Bill Lane – additional engineer, recording assistant, mix assistant
- Rich Tosi – recording assistant, mix assistant, photography
- Ron McMaster – mastering
- Dustin Stanton – art design
- Recorded at Groove Masters and Apogee Studios (Santa Monica, California).
- Mastered at Capitol Mastering (Hollywood, California).
