= Solo Acoustic, Vol. 2 =

Live album by Jackson Browne
- Released: March 4, 2008
- Recorded: 2007–2008 while on tour
- Genre: Folk rock, folk, singer-songwriter
- Label: Inside
- Producer: Jackson Browne, Paul Dieter

Jackson Browne chronology
| Solo Acoustic, Vol. 1 (2005) | Solo Acoustic, Vol. 2 (2008) | Time the Conqueror (2008) |

Solo Acoustic, Vol. 2 is a live album by American singer-songwriter Jackson Browne, released in 2008 (see 2008 in music). It reached number 4 on Billboard's Top Independent Albums and Top Internet Albums charts.

== History ==
This album serves as a follow-up to Browne's 2005 release, Solo Acoustic, Vol. 1, which was his first live release since 1977's landmark Running on Empty. These performances were recorded at various locations in the United States and Europe during Browne's solo acoustic tour.

== Reception ==
Professional ratings
Review scores
| Source | Rating |
|---|---|
| Allmusic | 3.5/5 stars |

Music critic Thom Jurek, writing for Allmusic, criticized the between-songs commentary, but wrote that Browne's songs "communicate so directly that, presented in this manner, with only an acoustic guitar or a piano as accompaniment, we can find ourselves wandering around in reverie, or re-glimpsing the traces of emotion and time's passage as signposts to the way we live now. [...T]hese 12 songs are quietly powerful, full of a particular craft and enigmatic gifts — no matter when they were written or recorded. Browne has never lost it as a songwriter; this is the proof."

== Track listing ==
All songs written by Jackson Browne, except where otherwise noted

1. "Never Stop" (Jackson Browne, Mark Goldenberg, Mauricio Lewak, Kevin McCormick, Jeff Young) – 5:35
2. "Intro" – 2:19
3. "The Night Inside Me" (Browne, Goldenberg, Lewak, McCormick, Young) – 4:50
4. "Intro" – 1:28
5. "Enough of the Night" – 5:03
6. "Intro" – 1:51
7. "Something Fine" – 5:16
8. "Sky Blue and Black" – 5:37
9. "In the Shape of a Heart" – 6:45
10. "Alive in the World" – 4:24
11. "Intro" – 1:21
12. "Casino Nation" (Browne, Goldenberg, Lewak, McCormick, Young) – 3:52
13. "All Good Things" – 4:33
14. "Intro" – 0:58
15. "Somebody's Baby" (Browne, Danny Kortchmar) – 4:38
16. "Intro" – 1:16
17. "Redneck Friend" – 4:31
18. "Intro" – 1:42
19. "My Stunning Mystery Companion" – 4:08
20. "Walking Slow" (available as a digital download with the purchase of the album from Best Buy in the United States)
21. "Shadow Dream Song" (Japan bonus track)

== Personnel ==
- Jackson Browne – vocal, acoustic guitar, piano

== Charts ==
Album – Billboard (United States)

| Year | Chart | Position |
|---|---|---|
| 2008 | Top Independent Albums | 4 |
| 2008 | Top Internet Albums | 4 |
