= Love Is Strange: En Vivo Con Tino =

Live album by Jackson Browne and David Lindley
- Released: May 11, 2010
- Recorded: March 9–22, 2006
- Genre: Rock, folk, Spanish
- Length: Disc One: 49:15, Disc Two: 57:19, Total: 106:34
- Label: Inside
- Producer: Jackson Browne and Paul Dieter

Jackson Browne and David Lindley chronology
Time the Conqueror (2008)	Love Is Strange: En Vivo Con Tino (2010)	Standing In The Breach (2014)

Love Is Strange: En Vivo Con Tino is the fourth live album by American singer-songwriter Jackson Browne, and 16th official studio or live album. A 2-CD live set released on the Inside Recordings label in 2010, the album documents a March 2006 tour of Spain that Browne and David Lindley took part in with Spanish percussionist Tino di Geraldo. The seven shows of the tour in Spain were followed by four in the United Kingdom. The album preserves performances by guest Spanish musicians flutist Carlos Núñez, vocalists Kiko Veneno and Luz Casal, and banduria player Javier Mas. Some songs have introductions spoken by Browne in Spanish.

The album won at the 2011 Independent Music Awards in the Live Performance Album category, and was nominated for a 2011 Grammy Award for Best Contemporary Folk Album. It peaked at No. 46 on the Billboard 200 albums chart and No. 1 on the Billboard Magazine Folk Albums chart. It reached No. 17 on Billboard's Rock Albums chart and No. 5 on Billboard's Independent Albums chart.

== History ==
In the liner notes to the album, Browne wrote that the 2006 tour of Spain was the idea of Paco Pérez Bryan, who suggested Browne bring Lindley, who has toured off and on with Browne for almost 40 years and has recorded off and on with him since 1973's For Everyman. The tour dates were March 9 and 10, 2006, in Madrid, Spain at Galileo Galilei, March 11, 2006 in Oviedo, Spain at Teatro Campoamor, March 16, 2006 in Bilbao, Spain at Sala Santana 27, March 17, 2006 in Palma de Mallorca, Spain at Auditorium de Palma De Mallorca, March 18, 2006 in Zaragoza, Spain at History Center Backyard, and March 22, 2006 in Barcelona, Spain at Palau de la Música. No recordings were made from the show at Palma de Mallorca because of difficulties transporting the recording equipment, according to Browne.

== Reception ==
Professional ratings
Review scores
Source	Rating
Allmusic	4/5 stars
Robert Christgau	(dud)
Rolling Stone	3.5/5 stars
Uncut	4/5 stars

In his review for Allmusic Thom Jurek wrote that the album "could have been an experiment that failed miserably, drenched in nostalgia and excess; instead, it succeeds grandly because of a sparse, tasteful approach with excellent arrangements and genuinely inspired performances." He also wrote: "beautifully recorded, this set shows what Browne is capable of when he has musical foils who will not allow him to simply rest on his laurels."

Rolling Stone rated the album three and a half out of five stars. Music critic Will Hermes said the album is "an album to please fans who didn't follow Jackson Browne on his Eighties detour into fight-the-power songs." Commenting on the performances, he wrote: "Browne's voice has barely aged, and Lindley's liquid slide is exquisite; versions often rival the originals."

For Uncut Magazine, Bud Scoppa, who reviewed Browne's debut album in 1972 for Rolling Stone, noted that "several of the songs Browne chose to revisit are from records on which Lindley didn’t appear, enabling the onetime partners to see what they could bring to the more recent material in tandem. The resulting performances are less renderings than transformations." Browne, "with a crucial assist from Lindley, ... fluidly unifies his entire body of work."

== Track listing ==
DISC 1

1. "I'm Alive" (Jackson Browne) – 5:03
2. "Call It a Loan" (Browne, David Lindley) – 5:02
3. "Looking East" (Browne, Luis Conte, Mark Goldenberg, Mauricio Lewak, Kevin McCormick, Scott Thurston, Jeff Young) – 7:02
4. "The Crow on the Cradle" (Sydney Carter) – 6:01
  - Featuring Carlos Núñez
5. "Mercury Blues" (K. C. Douglas, Robert L. Geddins) – 5:16
6. "El Rayo X" (Lindley, Jorge Calderón) – 3:59
7. "Sit Down Servant" (Traditional) – 4:04
8. "Take It Easy" (Browne, Glenn Frey) – 4:13
9. "For Taking the Trouble" (Browne) – 4:38

DISC 2

1. "For Everyman" (Browne) – 5:36
2. "Your Bright Baby Blues" (Browne) – 6:40
  - Featuring Javier Mas
3. "Tu Tranquilo" (Browne, Frey, Kiko Veneno) – 6:04
  - Featuring Kiko Veneno
4. "Late for the Sky" (Browne) – 6:03
5. "These Days" (Browne) – 4:39
  - Featuring Luz Casal
6. "Running on Empty" (Browne) – 6:34
7. "Love is Strange/Stay" (Bo Diddley, Mickey Baker, Sylvia Robinson, Maurice Williams) – 7:46
8. "The Next Voice You Hear" (Browne) – 9:05
  - Featuring Kiko Veneno

== Personnel ==
- Jackson Browne – vocals, acoustic piano, guitar, baritone guitar
- David Lindley – guitar, bouzuki, fiddle, Weissenborn lap steel, oud, vocals
- Charlie Cepeda – baritone guitar
- Kiko Veneno – guitar, vocals
- Javier Mas – banduria, archilaúd
- Raul Rodriquez – tres
- Tino di Geraldo – cajón, tabla
- Carlos Núñez – whistle
- Luz Casal – vocals

=== Production ===
- Jackson Browne – producer
- Paul Dieter – producer, recording, mixing
- Doug Sax – mastering
- Sangwook "Sunny" Nam – mastering

== Charts ==
Chart (2010)	Peak position
US Billboard 200	46
US Billboard Folk Albums	1
UK Albums Chart	80
