= Time the Conqueror =

Studio album by Jackson Browne
- Released: September 23, 2008
- Studio: Groove Masters, Santa Monica, California
- Genre: Rock
- Label: Inside
- Producer: Jackson Browne, Paul Dieter

Jackson Browne chronology
Solo Acoustic, Vol. 2 (2008)	Time the Conqueror (2008)	Love Is Strange: En Vivo Con Tino (2010)

Time the Conqueror is the 13th studio album by rock musician Jackson Browne. It was released on September 23, 2008, by Inside Recordings and was his first album of new material in six years. It peaked at number 2 on the Top Independent Albums chart and number 20 on The Billboard 200.

== History ==
The album addresses the frustration Browne has with the Bush administration. "Where Were You" questions the administration's handling of Hurricane Katrina, while "The Drums of War" derides the U.S. Government's enthusiasm for the Iraq War. Browne also contemplates love, travel, and the way the world has changed since The 60s. The title track was number 50 on Rolling Stone's list of the 100 Best Songs of 2008. It is also his first album to reach the top 20 on the Billboard 200 since 1983's Lawyers in Love.

== Reception ==
Professional ratings
Review scores
Source	Rating
AllMusic	2.5/5 stars
Uncut	2/5 stars

Rolling Stone gave the album a generally positive review, stating that the album was "recorded in a style that evokes his recent solo acoustic work and ... leaves no need for overworked arrangements." Mojo commented that "six years on from his last, with a white beard grown, Browne delivers elegantly considered weight and truth."

While praising some individual songs, AllMusic critic Thom Jurek remarked that Browne is "still trying to make sense of the world he wanted to live in and the one he actually does. Next time out, though, instead of worrying about his "enlightened" perspective, perhaps he should pay more attention to what made his earlier songs feel as if he actually owned one: craft." Similarly, Uncut says "The title song contains some lovely imagery enwrapped in one of Browne’s signature ribbons of melody, while the following 'Off Of Wonderland' is a wistful look back on the early days, but both are presented in arrangements so bland it’s shocking they passed muster".

Music critic Mark Guarino of No Depression called Browne "a first-rate depressive, but one who still won’t sour." and wrote that "given the anger in songs... the music doesn’t sound particularly pissed off... The ripped-from-the-headlines lyrics don’t necessarily hold up against a musical backdrop."

== Track listing ==
All tracks composed by Browne except where noted:

1. "Time the Conqueror" – 5:26
2. "Off of Wonderland" – 3:40
3. "The Drums of War" (Browne, Mark Goldenberg, Mauricio Lewak, Kevin McCormick, Jeff Young) – 6:13
4. "The Arms of Night" (Browne, Danny Kortchmar) – 4:34
5. "Where Were You" (Browne, Goldenberg, Lewak, McCormick, Young) – 9:48
6. "Going Down to Cuba" – 5:44
7. "Giving That Heaven Away" – 6:24
8. "Live Nude Cabaret" – 4:16
9. "Just Say Yeah" – 5:50
10. "Far from the Arms of Hunger" – 5:17

== Personnel ==
- Jackson Browne – vocals, rhythm guitar, acoustic piano on "The Arms of Night," additional drums on "The Drums of War"
- Jeff Young – acoustic piano, Fender Rhodes, Hammond organ, harmony vocals on "Where Were You"
- Mark Goldenberg – electric guitar
- Kevin McCormick – bass guitar
- Mauricio Lewak – drums
- Chavonne Morris – backing vocals
- Alethea Mills – backing vocals

== Production ==
- Jackson Browne – producer
- Paul Dieter – producer, recording
- Elliot Scheiner – mixing
- Bob Ludwig – mastering
- Dustin Stanton – package design
- Frank W. Ockenfels 3 – photography
- Recorded and Mixed at Groove Masters (Santa Monica, California).
- Mastered at Gateway Mastering (Portland, Maine).
