= Downhill from Everywhere =

Studio album by Jackson Browne
- Released: July 23, 2021
- Studios: Groove Masters (Santa Monica, California)
- Genre: Rock
- Length: 50:04
- Label: Inside
- Producer: Jackson Browne

Jackson Browne chronology
The Road East – Live in Japan (2017)	Downhill from Everywhere (2021)

Singles from Downhill from Everywhere
- 1. "A Human Touch"" Released: 2019; 2. "A Little Soon to Say" Released: 2020; 3. "Downhill from Everywhere" Released: 2020; 4. "My Cleveland Heart" Released: 2021; 5. "Minutes to Downtown" Released: 2022

Professional ratings
Aggregate scores
Source	Rating
Metacritic	76/100
Review scores
Source	Rating
AllMusic	3.5/5 stars
American Songwriter	3.5/5 stars
Classic Rock	3.5/5 stars
The Guardian	3/5 stars
The Independent	4/5 stars
Mojo	4/5 stars
PopMatters	8/10
Record Collector	4/5 stars
Uncut	7/10
Under the Radar	6/10

Downhill from Everywhere is the fifteenth studio album by American singer-songwriter Jackson Browne. It was released by Inside Recordings on July 23, 2021, and is Browne's first album of new material in seven years. It was nominated for a 2022 Grammy Award in the Best Americana Album category. The album title, and title track lyrics, were inspired by Captain Charles Moore.

== Track listing ==
All songs are written by Jackson Browne, with co-writers listed below.

Downhill from Everywhere track listing
No.	Title	Writer(s)	Length
1.	"Still Looking for Something"		3:10
2.	"My Cleveland Heart"	Val McCallum	3:20
3.	"Minutes to Downtown"		5:31
4.	"A Human Touch"	Steve McEwan; Leslie Mendelson	4:42
5.	"Love Is Love"	David Belle	4:46
6.	"Downhill from Everywhere"	Greg Leisz; Jeff Young	5:44
7.	"The Dreamer"	Eugene Rodriguez; David Hidalgo	3:16
8.	"Until Justice Is Real"		4:33
9.	"A Little Soon to Say"		6:25
10.	"A Song for Barcelona"	Mauricio Lewak; Bob Glaub; Young; Leisz; McCallum	8:37
Total length:			50:10

== Personnel ==
- Jackson Browne – vocals, acoustic piano (1, 4), electric guitar (3, 5, 6, 9), vihuela (7), acoustic guitar (8), nylon guitar (10)
- Jeff Young – vocals (2, 6), Hammond organ (3, 5, 6, 9), acoustic piano (6, 10)
- Jason Crosby – acoustic piano (3)
- Patrick Warren – keyboards (4)
- Greg Leisz – electric guitar (1, 3, 5, 6, 9, 10), lap steel guitar (2, 4, 8), acoustic guitar (3, 7), pedal steel guitar (4)
- Val McCallum – acoustic guitar (1, 2), electric guitar (1, 2, 6–10), tenor guitar (1), vocals (2), acoustic tenor guitar (5)
- Mark Goldenberg – electric guitar (3)
- Waddy Wachtel – electric guitar (8)
- Bob Glaub – bass guitar (1, 3, 5–10)
- Davey Faragher – bass guitar (2)
- Jennifer Condos – bass guitar (4)
- Mauricio Lewak – drums (1, 5–10)
- Pete Thomas – drums (2)
- Russ Kunkel – drums (3)
- Jay Bellerose – drums (4)
- Raúl Rodríguez Quínones – handclaps (10)
- Aletha Mills – vocals (3, 5–10)
- Chavonne Stewart – vocals (3, 5–10)
- Leslie Mendelson – vocals (4)
- De'Ante Duckett – vocals (10)

Production

- Jackson Browne – producer
- Kevin Smith – recording (1, 5, 7, 8, 10), mixing (1–3, 5–10)
- Paul Dieter – recording (2, 6, 9)
- Nate Kunkel – recording (3)
- Ryan Freeland – recording (4), mixing (4)
- Jeremy Hatcher, Ehud Kaldes, Garry Purohit and Mirza Sheriff – recording assistants
- Joaquin Bear, Peter Gjerset and Owen Lantz – studio assistants
- Gavin Lurssen and Rueben Cohen – mastering at Lurssen Mastering, (Burbank, California)
- Jeff Powell – vinyl mastering at Take Out Vinyl (Memphis, Tennessee)
- Dustin Stanton – design
- Edward Burtynsky – cover photography
- Nels Israelson – inside photography

== Charts ==
Chart performance for Downhill from Everywhere
Chart (2021)	Peak position
Belgian Albums (Ultratop Flanders)	44
Dutch Albums (Album Top 100)	46
German Albums (Offizielle Top 100)	24
Japanese Albums (Oricon)	42
Scottish Albums (Official Charts)	4
Spanish Albums (Promusicae)	73
Swiss Albums (Schweizer Hitparade)	13
UK Albums (Official Charts)	35
UK Independent Albums (Official Charts)	1
US Billboard 200	86
