= Keep the Light Alive: Celebrating the Music of Lowen & Navarro =

Keep The Light Alive: Celebrating The Music of Lowen & Navarro

Studio album by Various artists
- Released: 2010
- Genre: Various
- Label: AIX Records
- Producer: Janis Dalessandro, Mike Gormley, Kevin McCormick and Mark Waldrep

Keep The Light Alive: Celebrating The Music of Lowen & Navarro is a tribute album celebrating the 20-year musical career of Lowen & Navarro and raising awareness and funds for research into amyotrophic lateral sclerosis (ALS). The proceeds benefit the Eric Lowen Trust, ALS Association Greater Los Angeles and Augie's Quest. It was released in 2010.

On March 17, 2004, David Eric Lowen was diagnosed with ALS, also known as Lou Gehrig's disease. Because of compromises to Eric's playing and singing, Lowen & Navarro held their final show on June 6, 2009, in Alexandria, Virginia, at The Birchmere. Lowen died from ALS on March 23, 2012. Dan Navarro continues to tour as a solo performer.

== Track listing ==
1. "Weight Of The World" – Jackson Browne
2. "Keep The Light Alive" – John Ondrasik of Five For Fighting
3. "If You Loved Me Like That" – Keb' Mo'
4. "We Belong" – The Bangles
5. "Open Your Heart" – Severin Browne
6. "Old Riverside" – Joel Rafael
7. "You Stay On My Mind" – Andy Chase
8. "Compass Point" – The Refugees
9. "I Don't Believe In Yesterday" – Freebo
10. "Just To See You" – Eddie From Ohio
11. "Opposite Of Everything" – Phil Parlapiano
12. "Cold Outside" – Charlie Wadhams
13. "If I Was The Rain" – Stonehoney
