= The Birds of St. Marks =

Song by Jackson Browne

from the album Solo Acoustic, Vol. 1
- Released: 2005
- Genre: Rock
- Label: Inside Recordings
- Songwriter: Jackson Browne
- Producer: Jackson Browne

"The Birds of St. Marks" is a song by Jackson Browne. It was originally written in 1967 when he was 18 and returning home to California after a brief stint living in New York where he was recording with Nico. The song was recorded as a demo for Criterion in 1970. Browne re-discovered it in an interview from the 1994 concert video "Going Home" where he recalled it at the piano. It was again captured on his Solo Acoustic, Vol. 1 album when at a concert a fan called out and requested it.

Browne properly recorded it for the first time in 2014 and it appears on his 14th studio album Standing in the Breach and was released as the album's first and only single. "This is a song I always heard as a Byrds song, and that was even part of the writing of the song," he told Rolling Stone in an August, 2014 interview. The finished version of the song features Greg Leisz playing a "McGuinn-esque 12-string," described Rolling Stone. Leisz and Jackson were joined by Val McCallum (electric guitar), Bob Glaub (bass) Don Heffington (drums), while as described in MOJO "McCallum and Kipp Lennon stir[red] essence of Crosby into the vocal harmonies." The song is also featured in the 2007 movie Reign Over Me starring Adam Sandler and Don Cheadle.
