= Lives in the Balance (song) =

1986 single by Jackson Browne

- German 7" Picture Sleeve

Single by Jackson Browne

from the album Lives in the Balance
- B-side: "Candy"
- Released: 1986
- Recorded: 1985
- Genre: Rock, world music, neo soul
- Length: 4:12
- Label: Asylum Records
- Songwriter: Jackson Browne
- Producer: Jackson Browne

Jackson Browne singles chronology
| "In the Shape of a Heart" (1986) | "Lives in the Balance" (1986) | "World in Motion" (1989) |

"Lives in the Balance" is a song written and performed by American singer-songwriter Jackson Browne, the title track of his 1986 album, Lives in the Balance. A live version is also found on Browne's Solo Acoustic, Vol. 1. The song is written in the key of G minor with a rate of 138 BPMs. The song has a dark theme and lyrically it is about, “A country lying to its people and war.”

== History ==
Months before the Iran-contra scandal broke in the press, according to the 1989 Rolling Stone article "The 100 Best Albums of the Eighties," Browne sang on "Lives in the Balance" of wanting "'to know who the men in the shadows are/I want to hear somebody asking them why.' After the arms-for-hostages deals hit the news, the increased public awareness of the U.S. government's covert war in Nicaragua prompted Browne to produce and pay for a video for 'Lives in the Balance' well after the album had passed its peak in terms of sales. Discussing the song at the time of the video's release, Browne said, 'I imply that the truth is kept from us on a regular basis. I flat out say the government lies. Well, these things are no longer heresy [sic].'"

Released only as a U.S. 12" promo and as a 7" single in Germany, in 1986 the song was associated with American policies in Central America, but within the context of the U.S. invasion of Iraq, the song received new life as a single in 2005 when a live version was released from Browne's Solo Acoustic, Vol. 1 album. The song, Mark Coleman says in the Rolling Stone Record Guide, "is a cutting slice of social observation," as demonstrated in the chorus:

There are lives in the balance
There are people under fire
There are children at the cannons
And there is blood on the wire.

Jimmy Guterman, in his 1986 Rolling Stone review of the Lives in the Balance album, wrote approvingly of the lyrics of the song: "For Browne, our crimes in Central America are the clearest example of the wrongheadedness of U.S. foreign policy. 'Who are the ones that we call our friends?' Browne asks on the scathingly trenchant 'Lives in the Balance' and sadly answers himself: 'Governments killing their own.'"

The song includes musical support, as Guterman noted, from members of Sangre Machehual, a Los Angeles Nueva Canción group. The band thought it was a prank when Browne called them up and asked them if they would play on the album, according to member Hugo Pedroza. Pedroza plays charango and tiple, Jorge Strunz plays nylon string guitar, and Quique Cruz plays zampoña. Percussionist Deborah Dobkin and actress Mindy Sterling provide harmony vocals.

== Personnel ==
- Jackson Browne – lead vocals, acoustic guitar, sequencer
- Jorge Strunz – nylon string guitar
- Hugo Pedroza – charango, tiple
- Bill Payne – synthesizer
- Bob Glaub – bass guitar
- Russ Kunkel – drums
- Quique Cruz – zampona
- Debra Dobkin, Mindy Sterling – harmony vocals

== Other appearances ==
The song was used in two separate episodes of the Miami Vice, "Stone's War" in 1986, and "Freefall" in 1989, the final episode of the series.

The song also appears in the Bill Moyers television documentary The Secret Government: The Constitution in Crisis, which aired in 1987.

== Cover versions ==
- Third World covered the song on their 1992 album Committed.
- Richie Havens – Cuts to the Chase, 1994.
- Judie Tzuke – Universal Soldiers various artists compilation, 1999.
- Fred Martin & the Levite Camp did a version of the song on their 2006 album Some Bridges that features an extra verse added by Martin.
- Holly Near – Show Up, 2006.

== Chart positions ==
| Chart (1986) | Peak position |
|---|---|
| U.S. Billboard Mainstream Rock | 33 |

== See also ==
- "El Salvador", song by Peter, Paul and Mary
