= Thirteen Stories High =

Studio album by Joel Rafael
- Released: April 8, 2008
- Genre: folk, singer-songwriter
- Label: Inside Recordings
- Producer: Joel Rafael

Joel Rafael chronology
Woodyboye: Songs Of Woody Guthrie And Tales Worth Telling, Vol. 2 (2005)	Thirteen Stories High (2008)

Thirteen Stories High is a 2008 album by California-based folk singer-songwriter Joel Rafael. The album's political tone is set by the first track, "This Is My Country", which features David Crosby and Graham Nash on background vocals. Political themes continue throughout the album both in Rafael's own songs and in two covers: Steve Earle's "Rich Man's War" and Jack Hardy's "I Oughta Know".

This is the first album in which Rafael is billed as a solo artist and here he records with a few talented session players rather than with the members of his Joel Rafael band. Rafael does spend a bit of time covering old territory, re-recording his own songs, "Time Stands Still" and "Reluctant Angel". Rafael has announced plans to tour in support of the new record.

== Track listing ==
1. "This Is My Country" (Rafael) – 4:55
2. "Ball & Chain" (Rafael) – 3:01
3. "Rich Man's War" (Earle) – 3:09
4. "I Ought to Know" (Hardy) – 3:45
5. "Missing Pages" (Rafael) – 4:33
6. "Dancing to the Dream" (Rafael) – 3:45
7. "Open Up Your Heart" (Rafael) – 3:11
8. "Wild Honey" (McClemore, Rafael) – 3:03
9. "Time Stands Still" (Rafael) – 3:19
10. "Song of Socrates" (Rafael) – 3:34
11. "Reluctant Angel" (Rafael) – 2:45
12. "Promised Land" (Rafael) – 4:27
13. "Rivers and Rain" (Rafael) – 3:31

== Credits ==
=== Musician ===
- Joel Rafael – acoustic guitar, vocals
- John Inmon – Electric guitar
- Radoslav Lorković – Organ, Piano
- Glenn Schuetz – bass
- Wally Doggett – drums
- David Crosby – vocals
- Graham Nash – vocals & harmonica
- Jamaica Rafael – vocals

=== Production ===
- Produced by Joel Rafael
- Engineered Jared Brown, John Inmon, Joel Rafael, and Fred Remmert
- Mixed by Joel Rafael
- Mastered by Gavin Lurssen
- Executive producer/Management – Cree Clover Miller

=== Artwork ===
- Brian Porizek – Art direction, design
- Pete Lacker – Photography

== Charts ==
year	chart	peak
April 2008	Freeform American Roots Chart	19

== Releases ==
year	format	label	catalog #
2008	CD	Inside	80219
