= Solo Acoustic, Vol. 1 =

Live album by Jackson Browne
- Released: October 11, 2005
- Recorded: ca. 2002 – 2005
- Genre: Folk rock, folk
- Length: 70:36
- Label: Inside
- Producer: Jackson Browne, Paul Dieter

Jackson Browne chronology
The Very Best of Jackson Browne (2004)	Solo Acoustic, Vol. 1 (2005)	Solo Acoustic, Vol. 2 (2008)

Singles from Solo Acoustic, Vol. 1
- 1. "Lives in the Balance (Live)" Released: 2005

Solo Acoustic, Vol. 1 is a live album by American singer-songwriter Jackson Browne, released in 2005 (see 2005 in music). It reached number 4 on the Top Independent Albums chart and number 8 on the Top Internet Albums chart.

== History ==
Solo Acoustic, Vol. 1 was Browne's first live release since 1977's landmark Running on Empty. The performances were recorded at various locations in the United States and Europe during Browne's 2004 solo acoustic tour. The live version of "Lives in the Balance" from the album was released as a promotional single.

"The Birds of St. Marks" was originally written in 1970 and sometimes played in live performances, but was not released on any recordings until this release. "The Rebel Jesus" is a bonus track on Australian and Japanese versions, and on special edition CDs bought in the U.S. at Best Buy.

At 48th Grammy Awards Solo Acoustic, Vol. 1 was nominated for the Grammy Award for Best Contemporary Folk Album.

== Reception ==
Professional ratings
Review scores
Source	Rating
Allmusic	3.5/5 stars
Rolling Stone	3.5/5 stars

Writing for Allmusic, music critic Thom Jurek wrote: "The music here speaks for itself... his gift as a songwriter is enigmatic, unassailable, and singular."

== Track listing ==
All songs written by Jackson Browne, except where noted.

1. "The Barricades of Heaven" (Browne, Luis Conte, Mark Goldenberg, Mauricio Lewak, Kevin McCormick, Scott Thurston, Jeff Young) – 6:00
2. "Intro" – 1:44
3. "These Days" – 3:39
4. "Intro" – 0:30
5. "The Birds of St. Marks" – 4:47
6. "Intro" – 2:11
7. "Fountain of Sorrow" – 7:05
8. "Your Bright Baby Blues" – 6:12
9. "For a Dancer" – 4:48
10. "Too Many Angels" – 5:08
11. "Intro" – 1:22
12. "For Everyman" – 4:37
13. "Intro" – 0:30
14. "Lives in the Balance" – 3:38
15. "Intro" – 0:35
16. "Looking East" (Browne, Conte, Goldenberg, Lewak, McCormick, Thurston, Young) – 5:42
17. "Intro" – 0:15
18. "The Pretender" – 6:40
19. "Intro" – 1:21
20. "Take It Easy" (Browne, Glenn Frey) – 4:09
21. "The Rebel Jesus" (Bonus track)

== Personnel ==
- Jackson Browne – vocal, acoustic guitar, piano

== Charts ==
Album – Billboard (United States)

Year	Chart	Position
2005	Top Independent Albums	4
2005	Top Internet Albums	8
