= Carlos Varela (singer) =

Cuban singer-songwriter

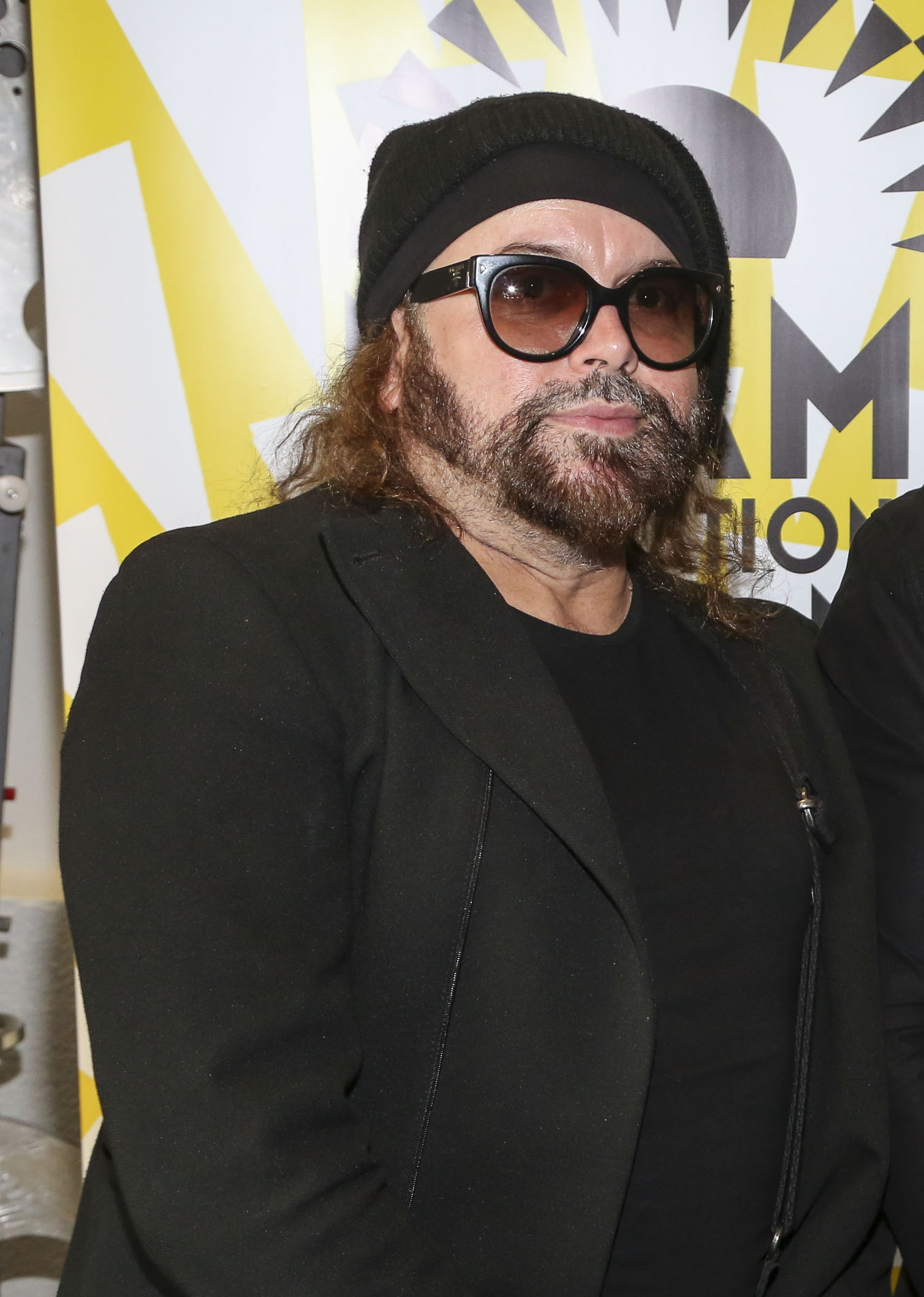
- Varela at the Miami International Film Festival presentation of The Poet of Havana

Background information
- Origin: Havana, Cuba
- Genre: Nueva Trova
- Occupations: Singer, songwriter

Carlos Victoriano Varela Cerezo (born 11 April 1963) is a Cuban singer-songwriter of Nueva Trova, a musical genre characterized by poetic and political themes. Emerging as a response to the unjust conditions that led to the Cuban Revolution in 1959, Nueva Trova emphasizes social commentary and activism. Varela joined the Nueva Trova movement in the 1980s, during his 20s. He has earned the nickname ("cariño" in Spanish) of "Nomo" (Gnome), due to his distinctive style of dressing.

== Career ==
Silvio Rodríguez, a renowned founder of Nueva Trova, discovered Varela and took him on tour in Spain. Varela's debut CD, "Jalisco Park", was released there in 1989.

Today, Varela's music is recognized for its candid criticism of the status quo in post-revolutionary Cuba, yet remains deeply rooted in the Nueva Trova movement and genre.

Singer-songwriter Jackson Browne translated Carlos Varela's song "Walls and Doors" into English for Browne's 2014 Standing In The Breach recording and tour.

Varela's song "Una palabra" ("One Word") was featured in the soundtracks of the film Powder Keg (2001) directed by Alejandro González Iñárritu starring Clive Owen, and again in the film Man on Fire in 2004 starring Denzel Washington and Dakota Fanning. It was also used in Episode 3 of Netflix's true crime documentary series, Night Stalker: The Hunt for a Serial Killer. He has integrated his music into the soundtracks of several Cuban films as well, such as Las profecías de Amanda ("The Prophesies of Amanda") and Video de familia ("Family Video"), among others.

== Discography ==
Year	Album
1989	Jalisco Park
1991	Monedas al Aire
1992	Carlos Varela en vivo
1995	Como los peces
2000	Nubes
2001	Tiempos Modernos
2003	Siete
2004	Sigo Aquí
2005	Los Hijos de Guillemo Tell Vol.1
2007	Bossa N' Tango
2009	No es el Fin
2010	Somos El Sur
2019	El Grito Mudo
