= The Cretones =

The Cretones were a Los Angeles–based power pop group in the early 1980s. Led by singer/guitarist and former Eddie Boy Band member Mark Goldenberg (who also wrote the bulk of The Cretones' material), the group had a strong sense of melody and a lyrical wit that placed them a cut above most of their new wave peers. Other members were Peter Bernstein (bass, vocals), Steve Beers (percussion), and Steve Leonard (keyboards, vocals).

Both their albums were released on Richard Perry's Planet Records label. On the Billboard Hot 100, the group's one charted song "Real Love" peaked at no. 79 in June 1980; it was from their album Thin Red Line. The song "Empty Heart" from their second album Snap Snap was their only other song to receive significant airplay on album rock stations, but it did not chart as a single.

They are perhaps best known as the band that provided three of the songs on Linda Ronstadt's new wave rock album Mad Love. Ronstadt's enormous success served to introduce and highlight Goldenberg's aggressive compositions.

After the band broke up, Goldenberg wrote the song "Automatic" for the Pointer Sisters, which was a top 10 hit in 1984. He later toured with artists such as Peter Frampton and Chris Isaak and had moderate success as a new-age instrumental artist in Japan. Since 1994, he has been lead guitarist for Jackson Browne and continues to write, play, and produce. Cretones members Steve Beers and Peter Bernstein helped produce and compose the score to the TV show 21 Jump Street. Beers has been producing television, and Bernstein has written numerous film and TV scores.

== Discography ==
- Thin Red Line (1980)
- Snap! Snap! (1981)
