= Love Is Strange (disambiguation) =

"Love is Strange" is 1956 song by Mickey & Sylvia.

Love Is Strange may also refer to:

- Love Is Strange (film), 2014 French-American drama film directed by Ira Sachs
- Love Is Strange (album), studio album by Kenny Rogers
- Love Is Strange: En Vivo Con Tino, 2010 live album by Jackson Browne and David Lindley
