= Tender Is the Night (song) =

1983 single by Jackson Browne

Single by Jackson Browne

from the album Lawyers in Love
- B-side: "On the Day"
- Released: September 1983
- Genre: Soft rock; pop rock
- Label: Asylum
- Songwriters: Jackson Browne; Danny Kortchmar; Russ Kunkel
- Producers: Jackson Browne; Greg Ladanyi

Jackson Browne singles chronology
"Lawyers in Love" (1983)	"Tender Is the Night" (1983)	"For a Rocker" (1983)

"Tender Is the Night" is a song by Jackson Browne released in 1983 as the second single from his album Lawyers in Love. The song peaked at number 25 on the Billboard Hot 100, spending 17 weeks on that chart after debuting at number 79, number 18 on the US Mainstream Rock Tracks chart, and number 24 on the US Adult Contemporary. It was also released as a single in Germany and the United Kingdom.

The music video for the song included the actress Daryl Hannah.

== Reception ==
In his 1983 review of the Lawyers in Love album, Christopher Connelly calls the song "an outstanding bit of songcraft with a gutbucket bottom nicely set off by Craig Doerge's jaunty keyboard touches. Browne takes in the world of lovers with an appealing wistfulness."

Cash Box said that "the tale of love and sanctuary is familiar ground for Browne, but his willingness to get up and rock is another step forward."

== Chart positions ==
Chart (1983)	Peak position
U.S. Billboard Hot 100	25
U.S. Billboard Top Rock Tracks	18
U.S. Billboard Adult Contemporary	24
