= Mark Goldenberg =

American songwriter

- Born: October 2, 1952 (age 73); United States
- Genres: Rock
- Occupation: Musician
- Instruments: Guitar; banjo; mandolin; keyboards; accordion
- Years active: 1976–present
- Website: markgoldenberg.com

Mark Goldenberg (born October 2, 1952) is an American guitarist and songwriter, noted for his session work and composition of successful songs for Linda Ronstadt, the Pointer Sisters, and others.

== Biography ==
=== Early career ===
Raised in Chicago, Illinois, Goldenberg studied at the Music Conservatory at the Chicago College of Performing Arts and its Chicago Musical College division at Roosevelt University. When the band he was in, Eddie Boy Band, signed a record deal with MCA, Goldenberg moved to California. Though the band broke up, he remained there as a singer-songwriter. In 1976, Goldenberg began playing guitar with Al Stewart.

After playing with Wendy Waldman (who had been Stewart's opening act), Goldenberg started the Cretones with bassist Peter Bernstein (later a noted film composer), and the band went on to record two albums: Thin Red Line and Snap! Snap!. Linda Ronstadt covered three of their songs on her 1980 Mad Love album, and the Cretones served as her backup band for a time. Goldenberg later formed the band Our Town, who recorded one album that was never released. In 1989, he studied guitar with Ted Greene. He also studied classical guitar with Richard Pick and piano and counterpoint with Abe Fraser.

=== Session work and songwriting ===
Goldenberg has played on recordings by Bob Dylan, Jackson Browne, Bonnie Raitt, Linda Ronstadt, Peter Frampton, Eels, Natalie Imbruglia, Chris Isaak, Karla Bonoff, Waylon Jennings, Willie Nelson, and William Shatner.

Goldenberg co-wrote "Automatic," a hit for the Pointer Sisters; and co-wrote "Novocaine for the Soul" for the band Eels. He also wrote "A Kick In The Heart" for Kim Carnes. His co-write "How Can This Be Love" was a UK hit single for Andrew Gold, and the opening track of Gold's 1978 album "All This and Heaven Too". Goldenberg played lead guitar in Jackson Browne's band from 1994 until 2010. In 2015, Goldenberg finished a two-year tour with Hugh Laurie and his Copper Bottom Band.

Goldenberg released his self-titled solo album of fingerstyle guitar music in 2005. He plays in a guitar duo with Eric Skye, with whom he has recorded one album, Artifact.

== Discography ==
=== Solo albums ===
- 2005: Mark Goldenberg (Bossy Pants)

=== Mark Goldenberg and Eric Skye ===
- 2016: Artifact (self-released)

=== With the Cretones ===
- 1980: Thin Red Line (Planet)
- 1981: Snap! Snap! (Planet)

=== With Jackson Browne ===
- 1993: I'm Alive (Elektra)
- 1996: Looking East (Elektra)
- 2002: The Naked Ride Home (Elektra)
- 2008: Time the Conqueror (Inside)
- 2015: Standing in the Breach (Inside)

=== As composer (and sometimes also performer) ===
- 1978: Andrew Gold - All This and Heaven Too (Asylum) - track 1, "How Can This Be Love"
- 1980: Mary Burns - Mary Burns (MCA) - track 8, "How Can This Be Love"
- 1980: Andrew Gold - Whirlwind (Asylum) - track 8, "Stranded on the Edge" (co-written with Andrew Gold)
- 1980: Linda Ronstadt - Mad Love (Asylum) - track 1, "Mad Love"; track 7, "Cost of Love"; track 8, "Justine"
- 1982: Peter Frampton - The Art of Control (A&M) - co-wrote all songs with Peter Frampton
- 1983: Kim Carnes - Café Racers (EMI America) - track 9, "A Kick in the Heart"
- 1983: Pointer Sisters - Break Out (Planet) - track 2, "Automatic" (co-written with Brock Walsh)
- 1984: Chicago - Chicago 17 (Full Moon/Warner Bros. Records) - track 6, "Along Comes a Woman"; track 9, "Prima Donna" (both songs co-written with Peter Cetera)
- 1985: Olivia Newton-John - Soul Kiss (MCA) - track 2, "Soul Kiss"
- 1985: Pointer Sisters - Contact (RCA Victor) - 6, "Bodies and Souls"
- 1986: Robbie Nevil - Robbie Nevil (Manhattan) - track 8, "Simple Life (Mambo Luv Thang)" (co-written with Brock Walsh and Robbie Nevil)
- 1986: Peter Frampton - Premonition (Atlantic) - track 1, "Stop" (co-written with Peter Frampton); track 6, "Moving A Mountain" (co-written with Peter Frampton and Steve Broughton Lunt)
- 1986: Shonentai - Diamond Eyes (Warner Music Japan) B-side "Rainy Express" (co-written with Tomo Miyashita)
- 1987: Cher - Cher (Geffen) - track 8, "Skin Deep" (co-written with Jon Lind)
- 1988: Akina Nakamori - Femme Fatale - track 3, "Dakishimeteite (Love Is My Favorite Lesson)"; track 5, "I Know Kodoku no Sei"; track 8, "Paradise Lost (Love Is In Fashion)";
- 1990: Judy Collins - Fires of Eden (Columbia) - track 4, "Fires of Eden" (co-written with Kit Hain)
- 1991: Cher - Love Hurts (Geffen) - track 4, "Fires of Eden" (co-written with Kit Hain)
- 1992: Peter Cetera - World Falling Down (Warner Bros. Records) - track 2, "Even a Fool Can See" (co-written with Cetera); track 3, "Feels Like Heaven" (co-written with Kit Hain)
- 1993: Anne Murray - Anne Murray (EMI) - track 11, "Shame on Me" (co-written with Tom Littlefield)
- 1993: E - Broken Toy Shop (Polydor)
- 2006: Eels - Eels with Strings: Live at Town Hall (Vagrant) - track 11, "Novocaine for the Soul" (co-written with E)
- 2008: Jackson Browne Solo Acoustic, Vol. 2 (Inside) - track 1, "Never Stop"; track 2, "The Night Inside Me"; track 8, "Casino Nation" (all co-written with Jackson Browne, Mauricio Lewak, Kevin McCormick, Jeff Young)

=== As producer ===
- 1988: Karla Bonoff - New World (Valley Entertainment)
- 1996: Eels - Beautiful Freak (DreamWorks)
- 1997: Jann Arden - Happy? (A&M)
- 1997: Jill Sobule - Happy Town (Lava)
- 1997: Natalie Imbruglia - Left of the Middle (RCA)
- 2001: Jann Arden - Blood Red Cherry (A&M)

=== Also appears on ===
==== 1978–1993 ====
- 1978: Al Stewart - Time Passages (Arista)
- 1978: Wendy Waldman - Strange Company (Warner Bros.)
- 1980: Chicago - Chicago XIV (Columbia)
- 1980: Pointer Sisters - Special Things (Planet)
- 1981: Peter Cetera - Peter Cetera (Warner Bros.)
- 1983: Bette Midler - No Frills (Atlantic)
- 1984: Kazuhiko Katō - Venezia (CBS Sony)
- 1989: Kon Kan - Move to Move (Atlantic)
- 1991: Paula Abdul - Spellbound (Virgin)
- 1991: Neil Diamond - Lovescape (Columbia)
- 1991: Bonnie Raitt - Luck of the Draw (Capitol)
- 1991: Michelle Shocked - Arkansas Traveler (Mighty Sound)
- 1992: Peter Cetera - World Falling Down (Warner Bros.)
- 1992: Melissa Etheridge - Never Enough (Island)
- 1992: Glenn Frey - Strange Weather (MCA)
- 1992: Ofra Haza - Kirya (Shanachie)
- 1992: Roy Orbison - King of Hearts (Orbison / Legacy)
- 1992: Ringo Starr - Time Takes Time (Private Music)
- 1993: Johnny Clegg and Savuka - Heat, Dust and Dreams (Capitol)
- 1993: Lea Salonga - Lea Salonga (Atlantic)
- 1993: Lowen & Navarro - Broken Moon (Mercury)

==== 1994–1999 ====
- 1994: Waylon Jennings - Waymore's Blues (Part II) (RCA)
- 1994: Bonnie Raitt - Longing in Their Hearts (Capitol)
- 1995: The Highwaymen - The Road Goes On Forever (Capitol / EMI)
- 1995: Chris Isaak - Forever Blue (Reprise)
- 1995: Randy Newman - Randy Newman's Faust (Reprise)
- 1995: Brian Wilson - I Just Wasn't Made for These Times (MCA)
- 1996: Valerie Carter - The Way It Is (Countdown)
- 1996: Travis Tritt - The Restless Kind (Warner Bros.)
- 1998: Richie Sambora - Undiscovered Soul (Mercury)
- 1999: Jesse Camp - Jesse and the 8th Street Kidz (Hollywood)
- 1999: Ziggy Marley and the Melody Makers - Spirit of Music (Elektra)
- 1999: Amanda Marshall - Tuesday's Child (Epic)

==== 2000–2006 ====
- 2000: Bette Midler - Bette (Warner Bros.)
- 2000: Vanessa Paradis - Bliss (Universal / Barclay)
- 2002: Stephen Bruton - Spirit World (New West)
- 2002: Julia Fordham - Concrete Love (Vanguard)
- 2002: Carly Simon - Christmas Is Almost Here Again (Rhino)
- 2003: Chris Botti - A Thousand Kisses Deep (Sony)
- 2004: Katey Sagal - Room (Valley Entertainment)
- 2005: Red Grammer - Be Bop Your Best (Red Note)
- 2005: MoZella - MoZella EP (Maverick)
- 2006: Brett Dennen - So Much More (Dualtone)
- 2006: Fred Martin and the Levite Camp - Some Bridges (Concord)
- 2006: Emily Saxe - Keeping (Ps Classics)
- 2007: Paula Cole - Courage (Decca)
- 2007: Johnny Hallyday - Le Cœur d'un homme (Warner Music)
- 2007: Ben Lee - Ripe (Inertia / New West)
- 2007: Lifehouse - Who We Are (Geffen)
- 2007: Mandy Moore - Wild Hope (EMI)
- 2007: Lacy Younger - Still Wild (Big Deal)

==== 2008–present ====
- 2008: Brett Dennen - Hope for the Hopeless (Dualtone)
- 2008: Julia Fordham - China Blue (CD Baby)
- 2008: honeyhoney - First Rodeo (Universal)
- 2008: Jude Johnstone - Mr. Sun (Bojak)
- 2008: Lenka - Lenka (Epic)
- 2008: Willie Nelson - Across the Borderline (Columbia)
- 2008: Victor & Leo - Nada Es Normal (Sony Music)
- 2008: Serena Ryder - Is It O.K. (Atlantic)
- 2009: Jessie James Decker - Jessie James (Mercury)
- 2009: Parachute - Losing Sleep (Mercury)
- 2009: Maia Sharp - Echo (Crooked Crown)
- 2009: Jill Sobule - California Years (Pinko)
- 2011: Danny Click - Life Is A Good Place (Dogstar)
- 2011: Mary Kay Place - Almost Grown (Wounded Bird)
- 2012: Joel Rafael - America Come Home (Inside)
- 2013: Kris Kristofferson - Feeling Mortal (Kuckuck)
- 2014: Stephen Bishop - Be Here Then (CD Baby)
- 2014: Neil Diamond - Melody Road (Capitol)
- 2014: William Shatner - Live (Cleopatra)
- 2015: Brian Wilson - No Pier Pressure (Capitol)
- 2016: Empire of the Sun - Two Vines (Astralwerks)
