= Lawyers in Love =

Studio album by Jackson Browne
- Released: August 2, 1983
- Recorded: 1983
- Studios: A warehouse, Downtown Los Angeles
- Genre: Rock
- Length: 35:30
- Label: Asylum
- Producers: Jackson Browne; Greg Ladanyi

Jackson Browne chronology
Hold Out (1980)	Lawyers in Love (1983)	Lives in the Balance (1986)

Singles from Lawyers in Love
- 1. "Lawyers in Love" Released: June 1983; 2. "Tender Is the Night" Released: September 1983; 3. "For a Rocker" Released: 1983; 4. "Cut It Away" Released: 1984

Lawyers in Love is the seventh album by American singer-songwriter Jackson Browne, released in 1983 by Asylum Records. It was Browne's fourth straight Top 10 album and stayed on the charts for 33 weeks, peaking at No. 8 on the Billboard 200. Out of eight tracks, four were released as singles. The title song reached No. 13 on the Billboard Hot 100 and was accompanied by one of Browne's first music videos released on MTV.

== Background and recording ==
In the intervening years between 1980's Hold Out and Lawyers in Love, Browne had released the single "Somebody's Baby", which became his biggest commercial hit to date, peaking at No. 7 on the Billboard Hot 100. Lawyers in Love was the first Browne album since his 1972 self-titled debut not to feature guitarist David Lindley. Replacing Lindley were guitarists Rick Vito and Danny Kortchmar.

Co-producer and engineer Greg Ladanyi explained the album's unusual recording sessions: "For this record, Jackson wanted to be downtown, where the people were. So we found a warehouse in downtown L.A., and just turned it into a studio. We set it up so that the band could play without the distractions of a normal studio because, for the most part, Jackson was writing the songs – in terms of the key changes and chord changes – based on what he was hearing when the band was playing. There was no 'Okay, it's take one or take two.' We kept the tape rolling just about all the time. And there are very few overdubs."

On the track "Downtown", Browne ad-libs a line to the melody of the Petula Clark song of the same name at the end of the song.

== Reception ==
=== Critical ===
Professional ratings
Review scores
Source	Rating
AllMusic	2/5 stars
Robert Christgau	C+
The Encyclopedia of Popular Music	3/5 stars
Rolling Stone	4/5 stars

Critic Robert Christgau called the album "a satire on, celebration of, and lament for the upper-middle classmates an Orange County liberal knows like he knows his neighbor's backyard". Rolling Stone critic Christopher Connelly felt that the record was "a more nervy, intelligent LP than its predecessor" and "a welcome widening of perspective that allows Browne to escape, once and for all, the L.A. albatross that has hung around his neck." However, he despised the "wretched" 5:20 of "antinuke agitprop" that is "Say It Isn't True" for displaying the worst traits of the album: "No quarrel here with the sentiments he's expressing, but to gravely intone, 'There always has been and always will be war,' over a 'Kum BaYa'-like coo of 'Say it isn't true' — surely, you say to yourself, he can't be that stupid."

In a retrospective review for AllMusic, William Ruhlmann referred to Browne's often overlooked songcrafting, but wrote "the craft, and the familiar tightness of Browne's veteran studio/live band, couldn't hide the essentially retread nature of much of this material."

=== Commercial ===
Lawyers in Love reached No. 8 on the Billboard 200. The album was certified as a gold record in 1983 and platinum in 2001 by the RIAA.

== Track listing ==
All tracks composed by Jackson Browne, except where noted.

Side one

1. "Lawyers in Love" – 4:18
2. "On the Day" – 3:56
3. "Cut It Away" – 4:45
4. "Downtown" – 4:37

Side two

1. "Tender Is the Night" (Browne, Danny Kortchmar, Russ Kunkel) – 4:50
2. "Knock on Any Door" (Browne, Craig Doerge, Kortchmar) – 3:39
3. "Say It Isn't True" – 5:20
4. "For a Rocker" – 4:05

== Personnel ==
Musicians

- Jackson Browne – vocals, guitars
- Craig Doerge – pianos, synthesizers
- Doug Haywood – organ, vocals, bass ("Say It Isn't True")
- Bill Payne – organ ("On the Day")
- Rick Vito – lead guitar, vocals
- Bob Glaub – bass, guitar ("Lawyers in Love"), organ ("Say It Isn't True")
- Russ Kunkel – drums
- Danny Kortchmar – unspecified instrumentation

Production and Technical

- Jackson Browne – producer
- Greg Ladanyi – producer, engineer
- James Geddes – engineer
- Danny Kortchmar – arrangements
- Ed Wong – technical engineer
- Brian Reed – production assistant
- Doug Sax – mastering
- Mike Reese – mastering
- The Mastering Lab (Hollywood, California) – mastering location
- Jimmy Wachtel – art direction, design
- Dawn Patrol – art direction, design
- Matti Klatt – front cover photography
- Randee St. Nicholas – back cover photography
- Joe Sohms – moon shot
- Elmi Graphics – front cover print
- Howard Carriker – front cover retouching
- Gloria Von Jansky – front cover type
- John Rothschild – set, light
- Tim Griffith – set, light

== Charts ==
=== Weekly charts ===
Chart (1983)	Peak position
Australia (Kent Music Report)	15
Canada Top Albums/CDs (RPM)	12
Dutch Albums (Album Top 100)	12
German Albums (Offizielle Top 100)	24
New Zealand Albums (RMNZ)	24
Norwegian Albums (VG-lista)	10
Swedish Albums (Sverigetopplistan)	3
UK Albums (Official Charts)	37
US Billboard 200	8

=== Year-end charts ===
Chart (1983)	Position
Canada Top Albums/CDs (RPM)	75

Singles – Billboard (United States)

Year	Single	Chart	Position
1983	"Cut It Away"	Mainstream Rock	37
1983	"For a Rocker"	Mainstream Rock	7
1983	"Lawyers in Love"	Adult Contemporary	24
1983	"Lawyers In Love"	Mainstream Rock	4
1983	"Lawyers In Love"	Billboard Hot 100	13
1983	"Tender Is the Night"	Adult Contemporary	24
1983	"Tender Is the Night"	Mainstream Rock	18
1983	"Tender Is the Night"	Billboard Hot 100	25
1984	"For a Rocker"	Billboard Hot 100	45
