= In the Shape of a Heart =

1986 single by Jackson Browne

- 7-inch picture sleeve

Single by Jackson Browne

from the album Lives in the Balance
- B-side: "Voice of America"
- Released: May/June 1986
- Recorded: 1985
- Genre: Rock
- Length: 5:41 (album version); 4:07 (single version)
- Label: Asylum
- Songwriter(s): Jackson Browne
- Producer(s): Jackson Browne

Jackson Browne singles chronology
"For America" (1986)	"In the Shape of a Heart" (1986)	"Lives in the Balance" (1986)

"In the Shape of a Heart" is a song written and performed by American singer-songwriter Jackson Browne included on his 1986 album, Lives in the Balance. Released as the second single from the album, it reached No. 70 on Billboard's Hot 100 chart, spending seven weeks on that chart after debuting at No. 72, but was a big Adult Contemporary hit, peaking at No. 10. It was also released as a single in the United Kingdom and Japan, and as a promotional 12" in Germany. A heart-shaped red vinyl promotional single was also released by Asylum, which included two remixes. In 2002, Browne also recorded a version of the song in Spanish ("Como Un Corazon") with the Spanish rock band Los Secretos for their album Sólo para escuchar.

== History ==
Browne is documented as saying that the song specifically addresses his relationship with his first wife, Phyllis Major, who died in March 1976 of a drug overdose:

It was a time I won't forget
For the sorrow and regret —
And the shape of a heart.

Jimmy Guterman, upon reviewing the album in 1986, singled out the song as a "mature version of the dark love songs on The Pretender. With the lyric "I guess I never knew/What she was talking about" coupled with "I guess I never knew/What she was living without,'" Guterman writes, Browne "nails heartbreak to the wall and sends his listeners scurrying for the Kleenex." In 1989, Rolling Stone magazine referred to it as "one of Browne's finest love songs."

In lines such as "People speak of love / Don't know what they're thinking of / Wait around for the one who fits just like a glove," the song can be read as the expression of a more experienced, skeptical or realistic view of love relationships. They "try to fit some name to their longing." Browne speaks of damage:

There was a hole left in the wall
From some ancient fight
About the size of a fist
Or something thrown that had missed.
And there were other holes as well, in the house where our nights fell
Far too many to repair, in the time that we were there.

The lyrics concludes with a dramatic moment:

It was the ruby that she wore
On a stand beside the bed
In the hour before dawn
When I knew she was gone.

Addressing the song's relationship between music and message, Allmusic's Mike DeGagne wrote that Browne "maintains a certain empathetic sincereness that is created without utilizing the traditional ballad-like form, and the song is helped along musically by a sound rhythm and a positive tempo, taking away any indications of self-pity."

The B-side of the single is a non-album track; a cover of Steve Van Zandt's "Voice of America", from his album of the same name. That recording has never been made available on album or CD, although Browne put his version of Van Zandt's "I Am A Patriot" on his next album, World in Motion.

== Reception ==
Cash Box called it an "appealing, heart-felt treatise on modern love" and said that "creative, captivating production effectively builds to an emotional climax" and "typically powerful Browne lyrics make the package rewarding on many levels." Billboard said it "explores politics of a personal kind in a quiet vignette."

== Chart positions ==
Chart (1986)	Peak position
U.S. Billboard Hot 100	70
U.S. Billboard Adult Contemporary	10
U.S. Billboard Mainstream Rock	15
