= Lawyers in Love (song) =

1983 single by Jackson Browne

Single by Jackson Browne

from the album Lawyers in Love
- B-side: "Say It Isn't True"
- Released: June 1983
- Recorded: 1981–1982
- Genre: Pop
- Length: 4:18
- Songwriter: Jackson Browne
- Producers: Jackson Browne; Greg Ladanyi

Jackson Browne singles chronology
"Somebody's Baby" (1982)	"Lawyers in Love" (1983)	"Tender Is the Night" (1983)

"Lawyers in Love" is the first single and title track of Jackson Browne's 1983 album of the same name, Lawyers in Love. Though not as successful as Browne's previous single "Somebody's Baby", nonetheless at #13 it became Browne's fourth-highest peaking hit on the Hot 100 as well as his final top 20 hit on the American pop charts, while in Canada peaking on RPM at #13. Browne wrote most of the songs on the album, including the title track.

== History ==
The song's title was proposed by Browne's brother-in-law, who said that "all Los Angeles looked like it had been designed by lawyers in love".

Some analysts later saw "Lawyers in Love" as an evolving "bridge" between Browne's personal works and his 1980s' political works. Others saw it as dry commentary on American social mores and something of a scathing critique of the conservativism and materialism of the Ronald Reagan era, something that had been present in Browne's work as far back as "Take It Easy". "As probing (and hysterical) a dissection of cold-war politics in the Reagan era as the mainstream will allow," Jimmy Guterman wrote of the song in Rolling Stone in 1986.

Christopher Connelly, in reviewing the album for Rolling Stone in 1983, paid extra attention to the title track, writing that "in 'Lawyers in Love,' God's interplanetary travelers discover Americans 'waiting for World War III,' shoveling down fast food in front of the television. All told, it's an unusually whimsical lyric from a man not noted for his sense of humor." As for the music, Connelly called the song "Browne's headiest track to date: a solid keyboard-and-guitar attack flavored by a chanting falsetto figure, a church-organ swell, sha-la-la backup vocals, even an old-fashioned modulation out of the middle eight."

Cash Box called the song "a fine effort and an 'ooh-la-la' chorus to boot," and praised the "thundering '60s guitar."

The music video for "Lawyers in Love" took the title phrase and created a series of visual images surrounding it, especially themed on the Cold War. Browne played at least two parts, one as a yuppie-ish lawyer and one as an ordinary man wearing a white T-shirt, blue jeans, and a pair of black hi-top Converse Chuck Taylor All-Stars, sitting in a catatonic state in front of a television, unable to assimilate the world's events. The video also features a performance by the "Synchronized Briefcase Drill Team," a popular entrant in the annual Pasadena Doo Dah Parade. Later in 1983, Browne himself marched with the team in the parade after having them participate in the video.

== Personnel ==
Credits are adapted from the liner notes of The Very Best of Jackson Browne.

- Jackson Browne – lead vocals, rhythm guitar
- Craig Doerge – piano, synthesizers
- Bob Glaub – bass guitar, additional guitars
- Doug Haywood – Hammond organ, harmony vocals
- Danny Kortchmar – arrangements
- Russ Kunkel – drums
- Rick Vito – lead guitar, harmony vocals

== Charts ==
Year-end chart (1983)	Rank
US Top Pop Singles (Billboard)	87
