= Lives in the Balance =

Studio album by Jackson Browne
- Released: February 18, 1986
- Recorded: Late summer to late fall 1985
- Studios: Sunset Sound Factory (Hollywood, California); The Outpost and The Complex (Los Angeles, California)
- Genre: Rock
- Length: 39:15
- Label: Asylum
- Producer: Jackson Browne

Jackson Browne chronology
Lawyers in Love (1983)	Lives in the Balance (1986)	World in Motion (1989)

Singles from Lives in the Balance
- 1. "For America" Released: February 1986; 2. "In the Shape of a Heart" Released: May/June 1986; 3. "Live in the Balance" Released: 1986; 4. "Black and White" Released: 1986

Lives in the Balance is the eighth album by American singer-songwriter Jackson Browne, released on February 18, 1986. It reached number 23 on the Billboard 200 chart. The title track as well as "For America" and "In the Shape of a Heart" were released as singles. The album was ranked number 88 on Rolling Stone's list of the best 100 albums of the 1980s. The album reached number 2 in Sweden.

== History ==
Lives in the Balance was the first album by Browne where overtly political and socially critical songs dominated (three of which were about president Ronald Reagan), although it also included one of his best remembered songs about relationships, the tragic "In the Shape of a Heart", inspired by his relationship with his first wife. The radio play garnered by "For America" and "In the Shape of a Heart", and the use of "Lives in the Balance" in the show Miami Vice, gained him many new fans who later went back and discovered Browne's earlier works.

The lesser commercial success of the album, according to a November 1989 Rolling Stone article, hardly mattered to Browne: "I like this album as much as any I've ever done," Browne said. "And there's a certain comfort, a security that I have, talking about something that I feel this strongly about. And whether or not an album succeeds wildly or not, that's intact."

The album was certified gold in July 1986 by the Recording Industry Association of America (RIAA).

== Reception ==
Professional ratings
Review scores
Source	Rating
AllMusic	3/5 stars
Robert Christgau	B
The Encyclopedia of Popular Music	2/5 stars
Rolling Stone Record Guide	2/5 stars

Critical press focused on the political direction of Lives in the Balance. Music critic William Rulhmann wrote retrospectively: "if Browne sounded more involved in his music than he had in some time, the specificity of its approach inevitably limited its appeal and its long-term significance."

Critic Robert Christgau also commented in a similar vein: "The difference is that Browne shouldn't be doing this... he's a pop star who's stretching his audience and endangering his market share merely by making such a statement in 1986. And he's thought hard getting here—not only does his way with words render these lyrics somewhat deeper than Holly Near's, but his moralistic put-downs have that edge of righteous anger nobody's yet found the formula for." The Rolling Stone Record Guide wrote that "the title track is a cutting slice of social observation, but the remainder of the album is muddled. For the first time, Browne seems unsure of himself."

However, the original 1986 Rolling Stone review by Jimmy Guterman praised the album overall, in part because of Browne's "new-found ability to link the personal to the political," which "breathes life" into the songs and "prevents them from becoming too didactic. Browne's not just writing about the headlines; he's trying to tell the stories of the people they affect."

== Track listing ==
All tracks composed by Browne except where noted.

No.	Title	Writer(s)	Length
1.	"For America"		5:13
2.	"Soldier of Plenty"		4:37
3.	"In the Shape of a Heart"		5:41
4.	"Candy"	Greg Copeland, Wally Stocker	4:12
5.	"Lawless Avenues"	Browne, Jorge Calderón	5:40
6.	"Lives in the Balance"		4:18
7.	"Till I Go Down"		4:19
8.	"Black and White"		5:15

== Personnel ==
The list of contributors is as follows.

- Jackson Browne – lead vocals, vocoder (1), acoustic guitar (2, 3, 6), sequencing (2, 6), acoustic piano (4), harmony vocals (6)
- Jai Winding – acoustic piano (1), synthesizers (1, 4–6, 8), organ (5)
- Bill Payne – synthesizers (2–4, 6), acoustic piano (8)
- Danny Kortchmar – sequencing (2), guitars (5)
- Craig Doerge – synthesizers (3)
- Bernie Larsen – clavinet (7), guitars (7)
- Ian McLagan – organ (7)
- Gary Myrick – guitars (1)
- Steve Lukather – guitars (2, 4, 8)
- Rick Vito – guitars (3)
- David Lindley – guitars (5, 7)
- Waddy Wachtel – guitars (5)
- Jorge Strunz – nylon-string acoustic guitar (6)
- Hugo Pedroza – charango (6), tiple (6)
- Kevin McCormick – guitars (7), harmony vocals (7)
- Kevin Dukes – guitars (8)
- Jennifer Condos – bass (1)
- Bob Glaub – bass (2–4, 6, 8)
- Jorge Calderón – bass (5), harmony vocals (5)
- Phil Chen – bass (7)
- Ian Wallace – drums (1, 7)
- Russ Kunkel – drums (2, 4, 6, 8)
- Stan Lynch – drums (3)
- Jim Keltner – drums (5)
- Walfredo Reyes Jr. – congas (5)
- Phil Kenzie – alto saxophone (1)
- Enrique "Quique" Cruz – zampona (6)
- Doug Haywood – harmony vocals (3, 4, 7, 8)
- Bonnie Raitt – harmony vocals (4)
- Debra Dobkin – harmony vocals (6)
- Mindy Sterling – harmony vocals (6)

== Production ==
- Jackson Browne – producer
- James Geddes – engineer, mixing
- Greg Ladanyi – mixing
- Tchad Blake – assistant engineer
- Bill Jackson – assistant engineer
- Coke Johnson – assistant engineer
- Ed Wong – technical engineer
- Murray Dvorkin – mix assistant
- Sharon Rice – mix assistant
- Doug Sax – mastering at The Mastering Lab (Hollywood, California)
- Steven Landsberg – production assistant
- Dawn Patrol – art direction
- Jimmy Wachtel – art direction
- Richard Duardo – cover artwork
- Basia Kenton – back cover photography

== Charts ==
=== Weekly charts ===
Chart (1986)	Peak position
Australia (Kent Music Report)	37
Canada Top Albums/CDs (RPM)	46
Dutch Albums (Album Top 100)	33
German Albums (Offizielle Top 100)	25
Norwegian Albums (VG-lista)	13
Swedish Albums (Sverigetopplistan)	2
Swiss Albums (Schweizer Hitparade)	20
UK Albums (Official Charts)	36
US Billboard 200	23

=== Year-end charts ===
Chart (1986)	Position
US Billboard 200	68

Singles – Billboard (United States)

Year	Single	Chart	Position
1986	"For America"	Mainstream Rock Tracks	3
1986	"For America"	The Billboard Hot 100	30
1986	"In the Shape of a Heart"	Adult Contemporary	10
1986	"In the Shape of a Heart"	Mainstream Rock Tracks	15
1986	"In the Shape of a Heart"	The Billboard Hot 100	70
1986	"Lives in the Balance"	Mainstream Rock Tracks	33

== See also ==
- Ronald Reagan in music
