= Rock Me on the Water =

- Autographed 7" Picture Sleeve

Single by Jackson Browne

from the album Jackson Browne
- B-side: "Something Fine"
- Released: July 1972
- Recorded: 1971
- Studio: Crystal Sound, Hollywood
- Genre: Soft rock
- Length: 3:47 7" version; 4:13 album version
- Label: Asylum
- Songwriter: Jackson Browne
- Producer: Richard Sanford Orshoff

Jackson Browne singles chronology
"Doctor, My Eyes" (1972)	"Rock Me on the Water" (1972)	"Redneck Friend" (1973)

"Rock Me on the Water" is a song written and performed by American singer-songwriter Jackson Browne, released as the second single from his 1972 debut album, Jackson Browne, following the No. 7 success of Browne's debut single, "Doctor, My Eyes". Browne's version reached No. 48 on Billboard's September 23, 1972, Hot 100 chart, spending nine weeks on that chart after debuting at No. 73 on August 5, 1972. It was also released as a single in Canada, Germany and Japan, and as a promotional single in the United Kingdom.

== Origin ==
William Ruhlmann of AllMusic wrote that Browne was performing the song as early as autumn 1970. "In the songs he was writing shortly before his recording debut in 1972, Jackson Browne continually alluded to apocalyptic events, but never more explicitly than in 'Rock Me...'," he wrote. Browne is documented as saying that the song, with its reference to the "sisters of the sun," pays homage to his real-life sisters.

Browne addressed the gospel and religious issues in the song, saying that "it's not about religion, it's about society." The song is meant to employ gospel language, but, he said, he turns "it around 180 degrees... If you heard even three seconds of it, you would say, 'well, that's gospel,' but you have to have an idea in a gospel song, and if it's not going to be Jesus, then it must at least be salvation. If I say 'when my life is over, I'm going to stand before the father, but the sisters of the sun are going to rock me on the water now' is like a way of, lovingly, and in a friendly way, refuting the traditional and conventional messages of redemption having to do with the straight and narrow... I staked a lot on that song, because it was a combining of that social awareness and paying attention to what's going on around, with the inner search for spiritual meaning."

Like much of the album from which it came, the song is presented simply, with only Craig Doerge (piano), Russ Kunkel (drums), and Lee Sklar (bass) playing, along with David Crosby's harmony vocals.

== Reception ==
Bud Scoppa, in his March 1972 review of the Jackson Browne debut album, stated that "Rock Me..." would make an excellent single and that the song's "lilting gospel-like movement" showed a Van Morrison influence. Record World called it a "can't miss single."

Bruce Springsteen referenced the song in his speech upon the induction of Browne into the Rock and Roll Hall of Fame in 2004 saying: "Listen to the chord changes of 'Rock Me on the Water' and 'Before the Deluge', it's gospel through and through."

== Cover versions ==
Browne did a version of the song with country singer Kathy Mattea for the Red Hot + Country AIDS/HIV awareness benefit album released in 1994.

- Johnny Rivers – Home Grown, 1971.
- Brewer & Shipley – Shake Off the Demon, 1971.
- Linda Ronstadt – Linda Ronstadt, 1972. Her single release predated Browne's own single release of his version of the song by five months, although her version of it only reached No. 85 on the Billboard Hot 100. Record World called her version "irresistible."
- Diane Schuur – Deedles, 1984 (debut album).
- John Hall (of Orleans) – Rock Me on the Water, 2005.

== Chart history ==
Linda Ronstadt

Chart (1972)	Peak position
U.S. Billboard Hot 100	85

Jackson Browne

Chart (1972)	Peak position
U.S. Billboard Hot 100	48
US Cash Box Top 100	45
