= Redneck Friend =

- French 7-inch picture sleeve

Single by Jackson Browne

from the album For Everyman
- B-side: "The Times You've Come"
- Released: September 1973
- Recorded: 1973
- Genre: Rock
- Length: 2:58 DJ single version, 3:56 album version
- Label: Asylum Records
- Songwriter: Jackson Browne

Jackson Browne singles chronology
"Rock Me On the Water" (1972)	"Redneck Friend" (1973)	"Take It Easy" (1973)

"Redneck Friend" (or, alternately, "Red Neck Friend") is a song written and performed by American singer-songwriter Jackson Browne, released as the first single from his 1973 album For Everyman, and notable for its double entendre lyrics and guest appearances by Glenn Frey and Elton John, as well as the first appearance of David Lindley on a Jackson Browne single. The song reached number 85 on Billboard's October 20, 1973, Hot 100 chart, spending 10 weeks on that chart after debuting at number 99 on September 29, 1973. It was also released as a single in France and Japan, and as a promotional single in the United Kingdom and Germany.

== Origin ==
William Ruhlmann at Allmusic.com wrote that Browne "unsuccessfully looked for another hit single with the up-tempo" song. The musicians who are credited with playing on the recording are Lindley on slide guitar, Frey on vocal harmony, Jim Keltner on drums, and Doug Haywood on bass. Elton John plays piano on the song, but is credited as "Rockaday Johnnie", supposedly because John was in the United States without a work permit at the time.

At the time of the song's release in 1973, the LP back cover listed the title as "Red Neck Friend", however, the single releases read "Redneck Friend".

== Reaction ==
For Janet Maslin, reviewing the For Everyman album in 1973 in Rolling Stone, the "glibness gets out of hand" with the song, which, she writes, "sounds like too deliberate an attempt to create a single by someone whose art, even at its most casual, remains too complex for strictly AM audiences". Anthony DeCurtis referred to the song as a "loose-limbed, honky-tonk rave-up." Billboard called it "clever socio-comment lyrics set to a basic rock beat". Cash Box said that Browne "follows his first hit with another rocker that will score tons of chart points on its way to a destined top 20 position". Record World called it "a cookin' rock 'em sock 'em item".

== Chart positions ==
Chart (1973)	Peak position
US Billboard Hot 100	85

== Cover versions ==
- Dave Alvin – West of the West, 2006.
- Jesse Dayton – ‘’Mixtape Vol. 1,’’ 2019.
