= For a Rocker =

1983 single by Jackson Browne

Single by Jackson Browne

from the album Lawyers in Love
- Released: 1983
- Recorded: 1982–1983
- Genre: Rock
- Length: 4:05
- Label: Asylum
- Songwriter: Jackson Browne

Jackson Browne singles chronology
"Tender Is the Night" (1983)	"For a Rocker" (1983)	"Cut It Away" (1984)

"For a Rocker" is a 1983 single by Jackson Browne. It charted at #8 on the Mainstream Rock Tracks chart. The third single released from his seventh album, Lawyers in Love, it's also the eighth and last track on it. It peaked at #45 on the Billboard Hot 100.

The song was something of a departure for Browne, a straight-out uptempo party number: "I got a shirt so unbelievably bright, I'm gonna dig it out and wear it tonight." Rolling Stone commented on its apparent attempt to emulate Bruce Springsteen's work, and indeed Browne used it to close out concerts in the arenas he was now playing. This song was written as a tribute to James Honeyman-Scott, the guitar player for the Pretenders, who had died of heart failure on June 16, 1982 at the age of 25. The reference to Peggy Sue is Jimmy's wife and Jenni is her sister.

== Chart positions ==
Chart (1983)	Peak position
U.S. Billboard Hot 100	45
U.S. Billboard Top Rock Tracks	8
