= Mad Love (Linda Ronstadt album) =

Studio album by Linda Ronstadt
- Released: February 26, 1980 (Charted on March 15)
- Recorded: October 24, 1979 – January 10, 1980
- Studio: Record One (Los Angeles)
- Genres: Rock; new wave
- Length: 31:09
- Label: Asylum
- Producer: Peter Asher

Linda Ronstadt chronology
Living in the USA (1978)	Mad Love (1980)	Greatest Hits, Volume 2 (1980)

Singles from Mad Love
- 1. "How Do I Make You" Released: January 1980; 2. "Hurt So Bad" Released: March 1980; 3. "I Can't Let Go" Released: June 1980

Mad Love is the tenth studio album by singer Linda Ronstadt, released in 1980. It debuted at #5 on the Billboard album chart, a record at the time and a first for any female artist, and quickly became her seventh consecutive album to sell over one million copies. It was certified platinum and nominated for a Grammy.

The album reflected the advent in the later 1970s of punk rock and new wave music.

Many veteran acts, including Fleetwood Mac, Carly Simon, Heart, Queen, Joni Mitchell and James Taylor, made sincere (and often successful) efforts to revitalize their sound by adopting aspects of the stripped-down, unpretentious D.I.Y. punk and new wave aesthetic. Mad Love was Ronstadt's response to this trend.

The album contains three songs by Elvis Costello ("Party Girl", "Girls Talk" and "Talking in the Dark") as well as three tracks from the Cretones' first album, Thin Red Line (1980). Although Ronstadt had regularly recorded edgy material by non-mainstream songwriters, including Elvis Costello's "Alison," she hired Cretones guitarist Mark Goldenberg to provide arrangements, play guitar and lend authenticity to the project. The cover art's brash, hot pink and black graphics and the singer's new spiky, short-cropped hairstyle reinforced Mad Love’s claim to New Wave status.

The production and promotion of Mad Love reflected the professional risk undertaken by Ronstadt after numerous multi-platinum hits. The inclusion of new material by established superstars who had included aspects of punk rock such as Neil Young ("Look Out for My Love") provided some continuity with Ronstadt's previous releases.

The record-buying public proved to be more adventurous than anticipated, making Ronstadt's risk pay off richly. The album's singles — the manic, Blondie-esque rocker "How Do I Make You" and the dark, breathless remake of the 1965 ballad "Hurt So Bad" — climbed to the #10 and #8 positions on the Billboard charts in mid 1980, while other tracks like "I Can't Let Go" received heavy rotation on classic rock FM stations. Mad Love reach #3 on the album charts and sold over one million copies, making it Ronstadt's seventh consecutive platinum record. For the fourth time, Ronstadt was named Billboard's #1 Female Artist of the Year. "How Do I Make You" earned her a Grammy Award nomination in the Best Rock Vocal Performance Female single category.

Ronstadt leveraged the success of Mad Love to compel Asylum Records to greenlight two non-pop/rock projects—a collection of torch standards backed by the Nelson Riddle Orchestra and a collection of classical mariachi music sung in Spanish. Previously deemed commercially unviable by the label, both projects were commercial successes on the scale of Ronstadt's pop albums.

In 2011, after 31 years, Mad Love was taken out of print. The album was reissued in 2012 as part of Warner/Rhino's "Original Album Series," a boxed set comprising five classic albums, but this series was also discontinued.

Professional ratings
Review scores
Source	Rating
AllMusic	3/5 stars
Robert Christgau	B−
Record Mirror	3/5 stars
Rolling Stone	(mixed)
The Rolling Stone Album Guide	2.5/5 stars

== Track listing ==
Side A
No.	Title	Writer(s)	Length
1.	"Mad Love"	Mark Goldenberg	3:40
2.	"Party Girl"	Elvis Costello	3:22
3.	"How Do I Make You"	Billy Steinberg	2:25
4.	"I Can't Let Go"	Chip Taylor, Al Gorgoni	2:44
5.	"Hurt So Bad"	Teddy Randazzo, Bobby Weinstein, Bobby Hart	3:17

Side B
No.	Title	Writer(s)	Length
6.	"Look Out for My Love"	Neil Young	3:29
7.	"Cost of Love"	Goldenberg	2:38
8.	"Justine"	Goldenberg	4:00
9.	"Girls Talk"	Costello	3:22
10.	"Talking in the Dark"	Costello	2:12
Total length:			31:09

== Personnel ==
- Linda Ronstadt – lead vocals, backing vocals (4, 6)
- Bill Payne – keyboards
- Michael Boddicker – synthesizers (10)
- Dan Dugmore – electric guitar (1–6, 8–10), electric guitar solo (1, 6)
- Mark Goldenberg – electric guitar (1–4, 7–10), backing vocals (1, 3, 7), electric guitar solo (3, 4)
- Danny Kortchmar – electric guitar (5), electric guitar solo (5)
- Mike Auldridge – dobro (6)
- Peter Bernstein – acoustic guitar (9)
- Bob Glaub – bass
- Russ Kunkel – drums
- Peter Asher – tambourine (4), percussion (9)
- Steve Forman – percussion (9)
- Waddy Wachtel – backing vocals (1, 7)
- Nicolette Larson – backing vocals (3, 4, 9)
- Rosemary Butler – backing vocals (4, 9)
- Kenny Edwards – backing vocals (8)
- Andrew Gold – backing vocals (8)

== Production ==
- Peter Asher – producer
- Val Garay – recording, mixing
- Niko Bolas – recording assistant
- Mike Reese – mastering
- Doug Sax – mastering
- The Mastering Lab (Hollywood, California) – mastering location
- Kosh – art direction, design
- Peter Howe – photography

== Charts ==
=== Weekly charts ===
Chart (1980)	Peak position
Australia (Kent Music Report)	6
Canada Top Albums/CDs (RPM)	11
Dutch Albums (Album Top 100)	37
New Zealand Albums (RMNZ)	22
Norwegian Albums (VG-lista)	34
UK Albums (Official Charts)	65
US Billboard 200	3

=== Year-end charts ===
Chart (1980)	Position
Canada Top Albums/CDs (RPM)	50
US Billboard 200	27

== Certifications and sales ==
Region	Certification	Certified units/sales
Australia (ARIA)	Platinum	50,000^{^}
Japan	—	100,990
United States (RIAA)	Platinum	1,000,000^{^}
^{^} Shipments figures based on certification alone.

== Release history ==
Release history and formats for Mad Love
Region	Date	Format	Label	Ref.
North America	February 18, 1980	LP; cassette	Asylum Records	
