= Doctor, My Eyes =

1972 single by Jackson Browne

- German cover

Single by Jackson Browne

from the album Jackson Browne
- B-side: "Looking into You"
- Released: March 1972
- Recorded: 1971
- Studio: Crystal Sound, Hollywood
- Genre: Soft rock; pop
- Length: 3:11 (Album Version); 2:55 (Single Version)
- Label: Asylum
- Songwriter: Jackson Browne
- Producers: Jackson Browne; Richard Sanford Orshoff

Jackson Browne singles chronology
"Doctor, My Eyes" (1972)	"Rock Me on the Water" (1972)

"Doctor, My Eyes" is a 1972 song written and performed by Jackson Browne and included on his debut album Jackson Browne. Featuring a combination of an upbeat piano riff coupled with lyrics about feeling world-weary, the song was a surprise hit, reaching number 8 on the Billboard Hot 100 in spring 1972, after debuting on the chart at number 80. Browne would not see the chart's top 10 again until 1982's soundtrack hit "Somebody's Baby", with "Running on Empty" just missing the top 10, peaking at number 11. Billboard ranked "Doctor, My Eyes" as the No. 92 song for 1972. In Canada, the song peaked at number four.

Jesse Ed Davis played the electric guitar (including a much-lauded solo) in the track, while David Crosby and Graham Nash sang backing vocals. Russ Kunkel played drums and Leland Sklar played bass. Kunkel and Sklar reunited with Browne in May 2021 to rerecord "Doctor My Eyes" for a charity project.

"Doctor, My Eyes" became a concert mainstay for Browne, and was included on both his later compilation albums. A live version can be found on the 1996 Australia CD release Best of... Live, a double set with Looking East, and the 1997 Japan 2-CD release of Best of... Live, coupled with The Next Voice You Hear: The Best of Jackson Browne.

== History ==
William Ruhlmann of AllMusic elaborated on the development of the song: "Browne first recorded a demo of 'Doctor My Eyes' for the Criterion Music publishing company in early 1971, and despite its striking imagery and carefully crafted writing, it was a bleak song ... By the time he came to record the song for his first album in the summer of 1971, however, Browne had revised the lyric, tossing out the most pessimistic lines. Now, 'Doctor My Eyes' was the statement of a man who had stoically endured life's hardships, but having done so, now worried that he had been rendered unable to feel anything. It still wasn't an optimistic song, but the unhappy ending had been rendered ambiguous." Ruhlmann addresses the final recorded version's "paradoxical sense" between the music and the lyrics: "Working with other musicians, Browne drastically altered the sound of the song on record. A lively 4/4 beat, played on drums and congas, and supported by piano, set up a catchy underlying riff before the lyrics even began. Browne's singing was supported by Graham Nash and David Crosby's harmonies, giving the lyrics an emotional edge. On the whole, the arrangement and performance worked against the still desperate message contained in the words."

There was originally a bridge and third verse to the song, but it was not retained when Browne recorded the song for his debut album. The lost lyrics, however, can be found on circulating bootlegs of the song's original demo.

In part 1 of the 2013 documentary History of the Eagles, JD Souther and Glenn Frey discuss at some length the process of Browne's work methods while Browne was working on the song over a period of some months. The three lived in adjacent downmarket apartments; Frey would hear Browne, through the walls, at work on his piano every morning.

== Reception ==
Jeff Walker, in his review of Browne's debut album for Phonograph Record magazine in 1972, wrote that "Doctor, My Eyes" is one of a number of tracks on the album that "deal with a spiritual search; no preaching, no conclusions, just searching." Cash Box described it as "the eye-opener to bring talented singer/songwriter to AM attention'" going on to say that "harmonies are great, but it's Browne tune and show all the way." Record World said it has "vocal color and phrasing much like Van Morrison but [Browne is] his own man."

Ruhlmann of AllMusic called it "a rollicking pop/rock song about being almost terminally burnt out."

Ultimate Classic Rock critic Michael Gallucci rated it as Browne's 7th greatest song, saying that "it's a little heavy-handed, as far as the sentiment goes ... but it sets the template for almost every Top 10 Jackson Browne song." Classic Rock History critic Brian Kachejian rated it as Browne's 10th greatest song.

== Chart performance ==
=== Weekly charts ===
Chart (1972)	Peak position
Canada RPM Top Singles	4
US Billboard Hot 100	8
U.S. Cashbox Top 100	12
US Adult Contemporary (Billboard)	18

=== Year-end charts ===
Chart (1972)	Position
Canada Top Singles (RPM)	65
US Billboard Hot 100	92

== Certifications ==
Region	Certification	Certified units/sales
New Zealand (RMNZ)	Gold	15,000^{‡}
^{‡} Sales+streaming figures based on certification alone.

== Cover versions ==
The Jackson 5 recorded "Doctor, My Eyes" for inclusion on their sixth album Lookin' Through the Windows, released in 1972. Their version was also released as a single. It did not chart in the US, but went top 10 in the UK, peaking at No. 9.
