= Jackson Browne (album) =

Studio album by Jackson Browne
- Released: January 2, 1972
- Recorded: 1971
- Studios: Crystal Sound, Hollywood
- Genres: Rock; folk rock
- Length: 40:55
- Label: Asylum
- Producer: Richard Sanford Orshoff

Jackson Browne chronology
Jackson Browne (1972)	For Everyman (1973)

Singles from Jackson Browne
- 1. "Doctor, My Eyes" Released: March 1972; 2. "Rock Me on the Water" Released: July 1972

Jackson Browne (also known, mistakenly, as Saturate Before Using) is the self-titled debut album of American singer Jackson Browne, released in 1972. It peaked on the Billboard 200 chart at number 53. Two singles were released with "Doctor, My Eyes", which peaked at number 8 on the Pop Singles chart, and "Rock Me on the Water", which reached number 48.

== History ==
Browne had found minor success as a songwriter, but had not yet obtained his own recording contract. After he sent a demo of "Jamaica Say You Will" to David Geffen in early 1970, Geffen began looking for a record deal for Browne. Geffen ended up founding his own label, Asylum Records, and signed Browne.

The album was certified as a Gold record in 1976 and Platinum in 1997 by the RIAA.

== Title confusion ==
The album is often mistakenly called Saturate Before Using, because the words appear on the album cover, which was designed to look like a water bag that would require saturation in water in order to cool its contents by evaporation. For this very reason, Asylum Records executives suggested to no avail that the words be removed from the album cover and nearly rejected the cover art outright. However, the initial pressings not only included the text, but the cover carried a burlap-like feel to further the water bag theme.

The confusion over the title returned when the album was converted to CD format, when the words appeared on the spine of the jewel case as the album title.

Browne told the story of the cover's creation and spoke of the title's confusion in an interview with the album designer Gary Burden for his 2002 DVD Under The Covers: "I remember being on the phone with Gary... talking about what the album cover should be, and I happened to be in a room that had a water bag on the wall. It was just one of the things that I collected driving around on trips and stuff. And I was looking at this bag as he was saying 'what do you think it ought to be?' I was thinking, 'well, it could be a water bag.' ... it said 'saturate before using' on the front ... 'You know, Gary, on mine, it says this on the back.' And you said, well, so?' And 'if you put it on the front, people are going to think that's the title.' And you said, 'don't be ridiculous. Who would think that was the title?' I said, 'Yeah, you're right.' So, not only does everyone think that's the title of that album, but my record company thinks that's the title of the album."

== Reception ==
Professional ratings
Retrospective reviews
Review scores
Source	Rating
AllMusic	5/5 stars
Christgau's Record Guide	B
The Encyclopedia of Popular Music	4/5 stars
The Great Rock Discography	8/10
MusicHound Rock	2/5 stars
The Rolling Stone Album Guide	4/5 stars

Jackson Browne received positive reviews from most critics. In his review for AllMusic William Ruhlmann praised the album as "an auspicious debut that doesn't sound like a debut" and "the album has long since come to seem a timeless collection of reflective ballads touching on still-difficult subjects...and all with an amazingly eloquent sense of language. Jackson Browne's greater triumph is that, having perfectly expressed its times, it transcended them as well." The Rolling Stone Album Guide stated "Browne's debut lays the groundwork for future heart-and-soul excavations. 'Doctor My Eyes,' an early hit single, communicates the subdued, subtle power of his half-spoken melodies, while 'Rock Me on the Water' and 'Song for Adam' foreshadow the free-ranging contemplation to come."

The original 1972 review in Rolling Stone stated "Jackson Browne's sensibility is romantic in the best sense of the term: his songs are capable of generating a highly charged, compelling atmosphere throughout, and--just as important--of sustaining that pitch in the listener's mind long after they've ended." Ed Kelleher wrote in Circus in 1972: "Though others have done him justice, Browne is his own best interpreter. He just eases back and lets the song come. He has the soul of a poet and the stance of a troubadour. Unlike many of his contemporaries, he has not fallen victim to the trap of over-production--the record has been crafted with care and purity."

Music critic Robert Christgau gave the album a B grade, however, and was ambivalent about the whole album, writing, "The voice is pleasant, present, and unpretentious, and when I listen assiduously I perceive lyrics crafted with as much intelligence and human decency as any reasonable person could expect. Unfortunately, only critical responsibility induces me to listen assiduously. It's not just the blandness of the music, but of the ideas as well, each reinforcing the other."

== Track listing ==
All tracks are written by Jackson Browne.

1. "Jamaica Say You Will" – 3:23
2. "A Child in These Hills" – 3:57
3. "Song for Adam" – 5:22
4. "Doctor, My Eyes" – 3:20
5. "From Silver Lake" – 3:49
6. "Something Fine" – 3:47
7. "Under the Falling Sky" – 4:08
8. "Looking into You" – 4:20
9. "Rock Me on the Water" – 4:13
10. "My Opening Farewell" – 4:45

== Personnel ==
- Jackson Browne – acoustic guitar, piano, vocals
- Leland Sklar – bass guitar
- Russ Kunkel – drums; congas on "Doctor My Eyes" and "Under the Falling Sky"
- David Crosby – harmony vocals
- Craig Doerge – piano on "From Silver Lake", "Rock Me on the Water" and "My Opening Farewell"
- Albert Lee – electric guitar on "A Child in These Hills" and "Under the Falling Sky"
- Jimmie Fadden – harmonica on "From Silver Lake"
- David Campbell – viola on "Song For Adam"
- Jesse Ed Davis – electric guitar on "Doctor My Eyes"
- Clarence White – acoustic guitar on "Jamaica Say You Will"
- Sneaky Pete Kleinow – pedal steel guitar on "Looking into You"
- Jim Gordon – organ on "Under the Falling Sky"
- David Jackson – piano and electric piano on "Under The Falling Sky"
- Graham Nash – harmony vocal on "Doctor My Eyes"
- Leah Kunkel – counter-melody vocal on "From Silver Lake"

Production notes:

- Richard Sanford Orshoff – producer, engineer
- Greg Ladanyi – mastering at Atlantic Studios (New York, NY).
- Gary Burden – art direction
- Henry Diltz – photography

== Charts ==
=== Weekly charts ===
Chart (1972)	Peak position
Canada Top Albums/CDs (RPM)	34
US Billboard 200	53

Singles – Billboard (United States)

Year	Single	Chart	Position
1972	"Doctor My Eyes"	Pop Singles	8
1972	"Rock Me on the Water"	Pop Singles	48
