= Joel Rafael =

American singer-songwriter

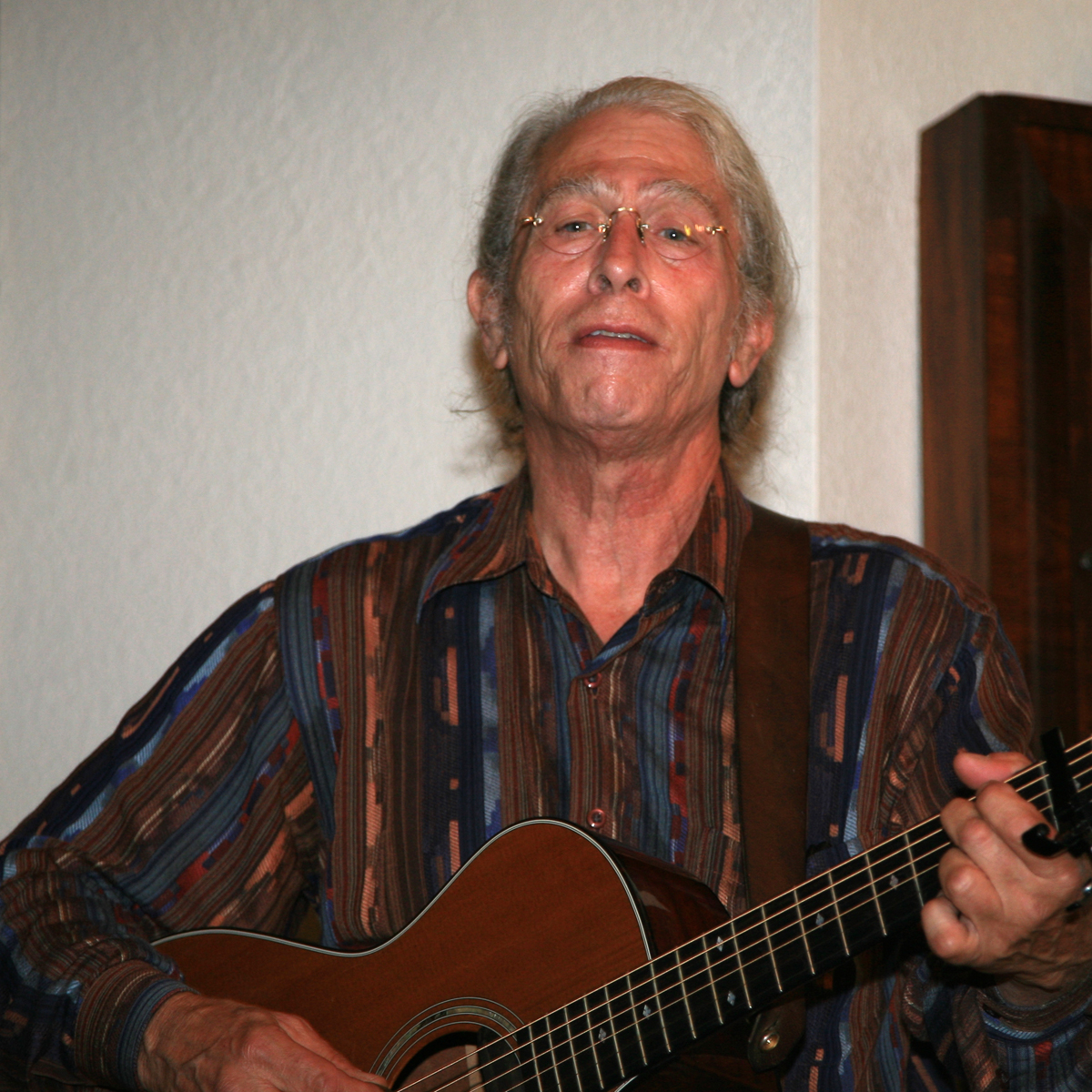
- portrait of Joel Rafael

Background information
- Origin: San Diego County, California, United States
- Genres: Folk, singer-songwriter
- Instruments: Vocals, acoustic guitar, harmonica
- Years active: 1994–present
- Labels: Appleseed, Inside, Reluctant Angel
- Members: Joel Rafael Band: Jamaica Rafael; Carl Johnson Jeff Berkley
- Website: www.joelrafael.com

Joel Rafael is an American singer-songwriter and folk musician from San Diego County, California. Rafael's second volume to celebrate the songs of Woody Guthrie, was released on Appleseed in 2005. The first volume, Woodeye, was released on Inside Recordings in 2003. Joel and his acoustic band have been performing and touring nationally since 1993. In 2000, the Joel Rafael Band, comprising Joel Rafael, (lead vocals and guitar), his daughter Jamaica (violin, viola and vocals), Carl Johnson (acoustic lead guitar) and Jeff Berkley (ethno-percussion), released their third album, Hopper on Inside Recordings, an independent label created by Jackson Browne and his management. The album was nominated in 2001 for an Association For Independent Music (AFIM) Best Contemporary Folk award.

== Early life ==
Rafael was born in 1949 in Chicago and raised in the San Gabriel Valley suburbs of Los Angeles. His music education began with grade school music lessons beginning with accordion lessons at age eight closely followed by the snare drum. Rafael played in the school band through junior high school. It was not until high school that he picked up the guitar. During high school he also began writing songs, including the theme song for a play produced by his school's drama department.

== Career ==
Although he was exposed to and loved music from the time he was a child, it was the folk music of the early 1960s that began to stir his interest in writing as he studied the writing and performing styles of Woody Guthrie, The Limelighters, Joan Baez, Bob Dylan, Ian and Sylvia, Ramblin' Jack Elliott and dozens of others. Although Rafael moved to the Northwest in the late 60s, he and his wife eventually returned to California settling in the rural foothills of North San Diego County. There, while raising a family, Rafael continued to chronicle his life and times in song. During the 1970s, 80s and early 90s, Rafael performed around southern California in various groups including as a duo with Rosie Flores. As a solo performer and with his band, he opened shows throughout the southwestern United States for artists including Crosby, Stills and Nash, Sheryl Crow, Laura Nyro, Taj Mahal, Iris DeMent, Emmylou Harris and the legendary John Lee Hooker.

In the early 1990s, when the AAA radio format came into being, KKOS in Carlsbad, California was one of the first radio stations to adopt the diverse format. Rafael found himself on the air along with artists from a variety of genres. "Because the format allowed something new, when I put my album out, it got added to the regular rotation" at KKOS, he said. KKOS was a commercial station paying royalties for the songs it aired and filing logs of its playlists with national reporting agencies – providing Rafael with his first national exposure.

In 1994, the Joel Rafael Band released their first CD on Rafael's own Reluctant Angel Records. The album won the San Diego CCMA award that year. In 1995, Rafael was recognized with the Kerrville Folk Festival's New Folk Emerging songwriter award. In 1996, the band released a second CD, Old Wood Barn, which was an Americana Hot Pick in GAVIN. Their third release Hopper was released in 2000 and produced by Rafael with the help of Dan Rothchild (Better than Ezra, The Lost Butterfield Tapes), who also played bass. Paul Dieter engineered and mixed the recording.

In 2003 Rafael was invited to perform in the Ribbon of Highway, Endless Skyway tribute show to honor Woody Guthrie. The ensemble show, which was the brainchild of Texas singer-songwriter Jimmy Lafave, toured around the country and included a rotating cast of singer-songwriters individually performing Guthrie's songs. Interspersed between songs were Guthrie's philosophical writings read by a narrator. In addition to LaFave members of the rotating cast included Ellis Paul, Slaid Cleaves, Eliza Gilkyson, husband-wife duo Sarah Lee Guthrie (Woody Guthrie's granddaughter) and Johnny Irion, Michael Fracasso, and The Burns Sisters. Oklahoma songwriter Bob Childers, sometimes called "the Dylan of the Dust," served as narrator.

Also in 2003 Rafael's first collection of Woody Guthrie songs, Woodeye: Songs of Woody Guthrie, was released. The album included 14 songs, 12 which were penned by Guthrie, one by Rafael, and one unpublished lyric, "Dance A Little Longer", is a co-write with words by Guthrie and music by Rafael. The album also includes guest appearances by Jennifer Warnes, Ellis Paul, Van Dyke Parks, and Matt Cartsonis. "I really wanted to make a recording that would be a Woody Guthrie experience for a new audience: a collection of songs, both familiar and rare, that would bring Woody's material within reach of the ears of today's listeners," explains Rafael. In her review of Woodeye for the North County Times, Kathy Klassen said, "Truly, this entire CD is memorable, and not just because of the songs of Woody Guthrie. Rafael, his band and collaborators offer a cohesive and interesting musical presentation that is only occasionally a tad overproduced. For the most part this album is a gift."

Two years later in 2005, Rafael released Woodyboye: Songs Of Woody Guthrie And Tales Worth Telling, Vol. 2, an album that includes four previously unpublished Guthrie lyrics. Special guests Jackson Browne, Van Dyke Parks, Jimmy LaFave and Jennifer Warnes cameo with Rafael and his core band that includes daughter Jamaica on violin and vocals, Carl Johnson on acoustic lead, Will Landin on bass, and Mauricio Lewak on drums. "Together they authentically and emphatically bring Guthrie – the man and his music – into the new century as vibrantly as the first day Woody hit the dusty roads."

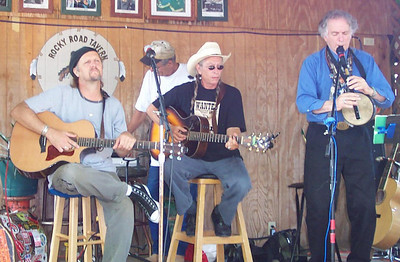
Joel Rafael (center) with Jimmy LaFave (guitar) and David Amram (flute) performing at the Woody Guthrie Festival in Okemah, OK. – July 15, 2006.

In July 2007, Rafael was one of seven performers honored at the Woody Guthrie Folk Festival. Festival organizers honored those artists who had performed at all ten festivals since the first in 1998. The honorees performed at a benefit show titled "In the Spirit of Woody Guthrie". In addition to Rafael, honorees were Jimmy LaFave, Don Conoscenti, Ellis Paul, Bob Childers, Terry "Buffalo" Ware and the Red Dirt Rangers.

In April 2008, Rafael released Thirteen Stories High, the first album of original material since Hopper was released in 2000. Thirteen Stories High opens with a simply-worded protest song "This Is My Country," featuring backing vocals by David Crosby and Graham Nash. Nash said "I wish I had written this song. So powerful and profound – a call from his heart to ours."

== Discography ==
| Year | Title | Record label |
|---|---|---|
| 2015 | Baladista | Inside |
| 2012 | America Come Home | Inside |
| 2008 | Thirteen Stories High | Inside |
| 2005 | Woodyboye: Songs Of Woody Guthrie And Tales Worth Telling, Vol. 2 | Appleseed |
| 2003 | Woodeye: Songs of Woody Guthrie | Inside |
| 2000 | Hopper | Inside |
| 1996 | Old Wood Barn | Reluctant Angel |
| 1994 | Joel Rafael Band | Reluctant Angel |
