= Paul Dieter =

American record producer

- Occupations: Audio engineer, record producer
- Years active: 1980s–present
- Known for: Work with Jackson Browne

Paul Dieter (born May 23, 1959) is an American sound engineer and record producer. He has been the staff engineer at Groove Masters, the Santa Monica, California recording studio owned by Jackson Browne, since 1990.

Dieter's first major job was as an audio engineer on tour with 10,000 Maniacs from 1985 to 1987, and he has since worked as an audio engineer on various projects with Linda Ronstadt, David Lindley, Fleetwood Mac, and David Crosby. He also mixed the sound for Vonda Shepard's performances on Ally McBeal.

In 1994, Dieter was a co-nominee for a Grammy Award for Best Engineered Album, Non-Classical (along with Ed Cherney and Rick Pekkonnen) for the Jackson Browne album I'm Alive. A great deal of his work in the past decade has been with Browne, at Groove Masters and on tour, most recently co-producing Browne's Solo Acoustic, Vol. 1.
