= Inside Recordings =

American independent record label

Inside Recordings is a Los Angeles, California based independent record label founded by singer-songwriter Jackson Browne in 1999. Browne has stated that the mission of the label is to "create a haven for music that might not find a home in the mainstream." In 2005, Inside Recordings signed a nationwide direct distribution deal with independent music distributor Alternative Distribution Alliance. The label's inaugural release under the agreement was Browne's own Solo Acoustic, Vol. 1, which was released in the U.S. on October 11, 2005. It was nominated for a Grammy Award soon afterward, just as Solo Acoustic, Vol. 2 was released. Artists with works previously released on the label include the Joel Rafael Band and Native American activist and spoken word artist John Trudell.

In 2008, Browne released his first studio recording in six years, Time the Conqueror, on Inside Recordings.

== See also ==
- List of record labels
