= Jackson Browne =

American singer, songwriter and political activist (born 1948)

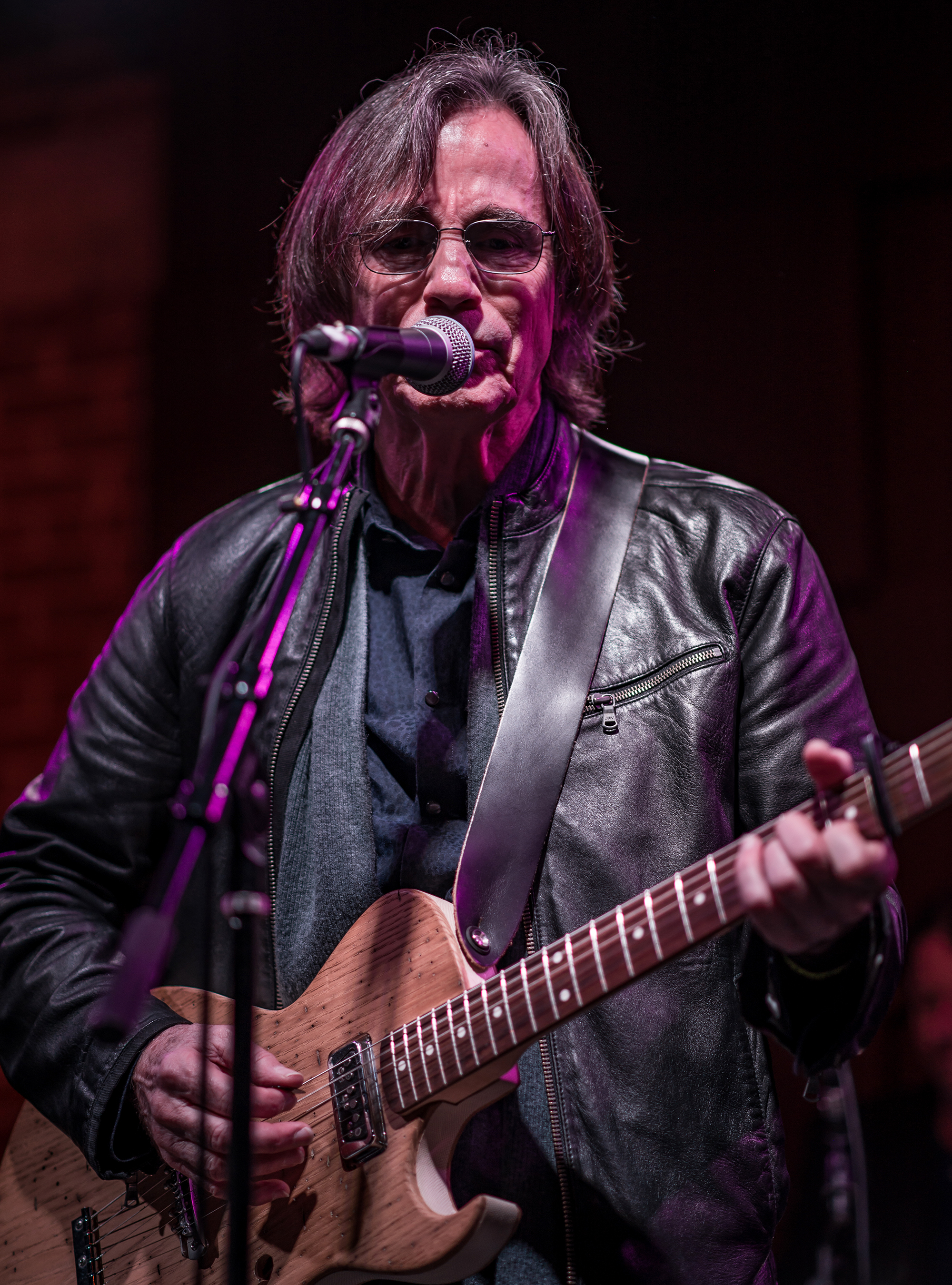
- Browne performing at the Unsung Heroes tribute to Eleni Mandell, January 2017

Background information
- Born: Clyde Jackson Browne; October 9, 1948 (age 78); Heidelberg, Germany
- Origin: Los Angeles, California, U.S.
- Genres: Rock; folk rock; soft rock; pop rock; heartland rock; country rock
- Occupations: Singer; songwriter; producer; political activist
- Instruments: Vocals; guitar; piano
- Years active: 1964–present
- Labels: Elektra; Inside; Asylum
- Website: jacksonbrowne.com

Clyde Jackson Browne (born October 9, 1948) is an American rock musician, singer, songwriter, and political activist who has sold over 30 million albums in the United States.

Emerging as a teenage songwriter in mid-1960s Los Angeles, Browne had his first successes writing songs for others. Encouraged by those successes, Browne released his self-titled debut album in 1972, which included two Top 40 hits of his own: "Doctor, My Eyes" and "Rock Me on the Water". His second album, For Everyman, was released in 1973. His third album, Late for the Sky (1974), was his most successful to that point, peaking at number 14 on the Billboard 200 album chart. His fourth album, The Pretender (1976), continued the pattern of each album topping the previous one by peaking at number 5 on the album chart, and included the hit singles "Here Come Those Tears Again" and "The Pretender".

Browne's 1977 album Running on Empty is his signature work; it rose to number 3 on the album chart and remained there for over a year. Both a live and concept album, it explores in its songs the themes of life as a touring musician. The album produced two Top 40 singles: "Running on Empty" and "The Load-Out"/"Stay", and many of the other tracks became popular radio hits on the album-oriented rock format. Browne had successful albums through the 1980s, including the 1980 album Hold Out, which was his only number 1 album; the non-album single "Somebody's Baby", which was used in the film Fast Times at Ridgemont High, and 1983's Lawyers in Love, which included the hit single "Tender Is the Night".

Browne has released two compilation albums, The Next Voice You Hear: The Best of Jackson Browne in 1997, and The Very Best of Jackson Browne, released in conjunction with his Rock and Roll Hall of Fame induction in 2004. As of 2026, his most recent studio album is 2021's Downhill from Everywhere. In 2015, Rolling Stone ranked Browne 37th on its list of the "100 Greatest Songwriters of All Time".

== Early life ==
Browne was born on October 9, 1948, in Heidelberg, Germany, where his father Clyde Jack Browne, an American serviceman, was stationed for his job assignment with the Stars and Stripes newspaper. Browne's mother, Beatrice Amanda (née Dahl), was from Minnesota of Norwegian ancestry. Browne's paternal grandfather was Clyde Browne, builder of Abbey San Encino.

Browne has three siblings: Roberta "Berbie" Browne, born in 1946 in Nuremberg, Germany; Edward Severin Browne, born in 1949 in Frankfurt, Germany; and his younger sister, Gracie Browne, born a number of years later. At the age of three, Browne and his family moved into Abbey San Encino, in the Highland Park district of Los Angeles. In his teens, he began singing folk songs in local venues including Ash Grove and The Troubadour Club. He attended Sunny Hills High School in Fullerton, California, graduating in 1966.

== Career ==
=== Songwriter for others ===
After graduating from high school, Browne joined the Nitty Gritty Dirt Band, performing at the Golden Bear in Huntington Beach, California, where they opened for the Lovin' Spoonful. Later the band recorded a number of Browne's songs, including "These Days", "Holding", and "Shadow Dream Song". He was in his friend Pamela Polland's band, Gentle Soul, for a short time.

He left the Dirt Band after a few months and moved to Greenwich Village, New York, where he became a staff writer for Elektra's publishing company, Nina Music, before he was eighteen. He reported on musical events in New York City with his friends Greg Copeland and Adam Saylor. For the remainder of 1967 and also 1968 he was in Greenwich Village, where he backed Tim Buckley and singer Nico of the Velvet Underground. In 1967, Browne and Nico were romantically linked; he became a significant contributor to her debut album, Chelsea Girl, writing and playing guitar on several of the songs (including "These Days"). In 1968, following his breakup with Nico, Browne returned to Los Angeles, where he formed a folk band with Ned Doheny and Jack Wilce. This is when he first met Glenn Frey.

Browne's first songs, such as "Shadow Dream Song" and "These Days", were recorded by the Nitty Gritty Dirt Band, Tom Rush, Nico, Steve Noonan, Gregg Allman, Joan Baez, Eagles, Linda Ronstadt, the Byrds, Iain Matthews, and others. Browne did not release his own versions of these early songs until years later. Soon Rolling Stone mentioned Browne as a "new face to look for" and praised his "mind-boggling melodies".

=== Classic period ===
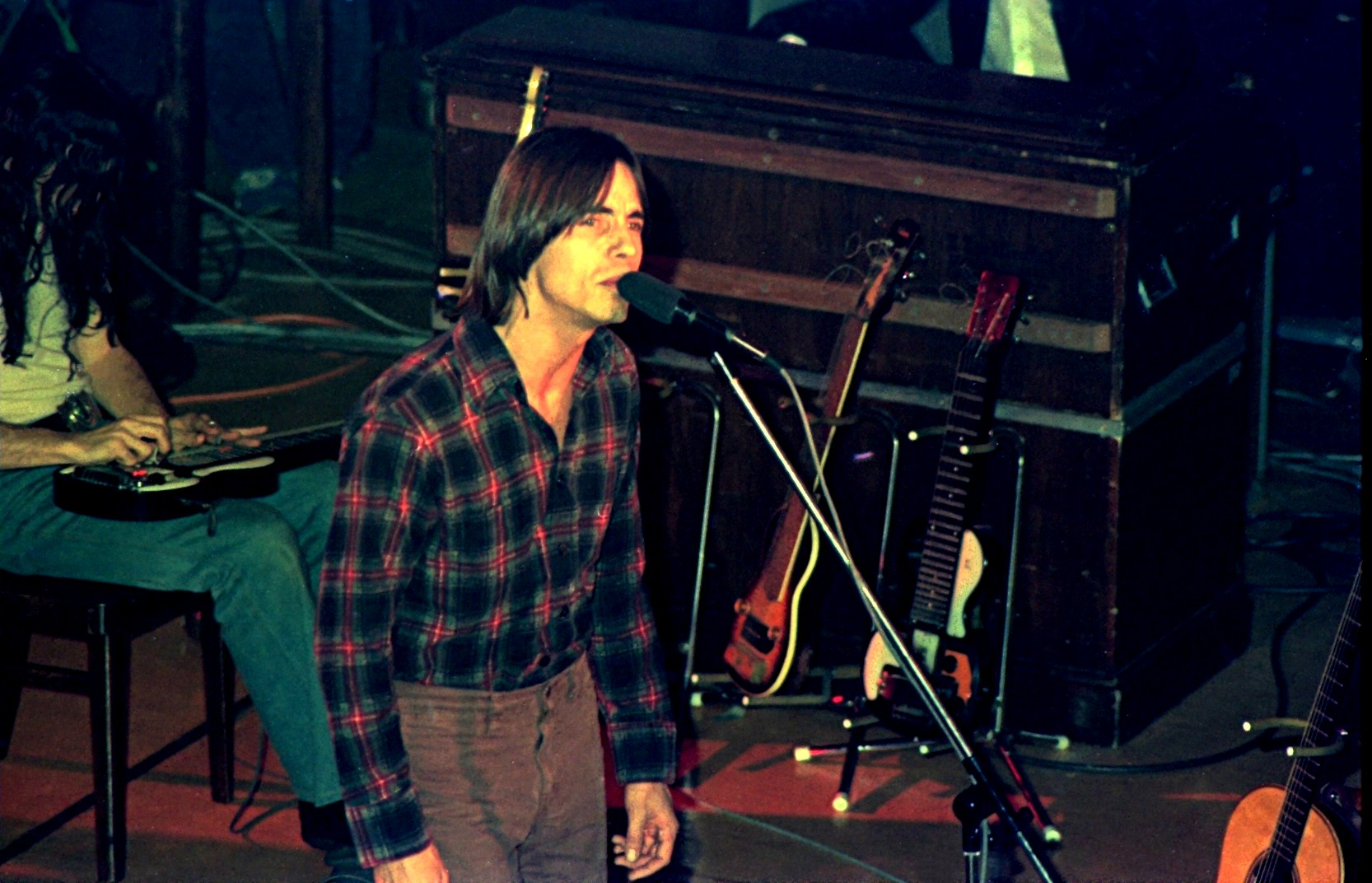
Browne during a 1976 concert in Hamburg, Germany

In 1971, Browne signed with his manager David Geffen's Asylum Records and released Jackson Browne (1972) produced and engineered by Richard Orshoff, which included the piano-driven "Doctor My Eyes", which entered the Top Ten in the US singles chart. "Rock Me on the Water", from the same album, also gained considerable radio airplay, while "Jamaica Say You Will" and "Song for Adam" (written about his friend Adam Saylor's death) helped establish Browne's reputation. Touring to promote the album, he shared the bill with Linda Ronstadt and Joni Mitchell.

His next album, For Everyman (1973), garnered good reviews but was less successful than his debut, although it still sold a million copies and included his version of "Take It Easy", co-written with Eagles' Glenn Frey, which had already been a major success for the group.

Late for the Sky (1974) consolidated Browne's fan base, and the album peaked at No. 14. He gained a reputation for memorable melody, insightful, often personal lyrics, and a talent for his arrangements in composition. The title track was featured in Martin Scorsese's film Taxi Driver. During this period, Browne began his fractious professional relationship with Warren Zevon, producing Zevon's first two Asylum albums.

Browne in 1980

Browne was accompanied on tour by his wife and their infant son. They traveled in a converted Greyhound bus. In 1975, Browne toured variously with Eagles, Linda Ronstadt, and Toots and the Maytals.

Browne's next album, The Pretender, was released in 1976, after his wife's suicide. A year later, "Here Come Those Tears Again", co-written with his mother-in-law, Nancy Farnsworth, hit No. 23 on the pop singles chart. The follow-up album, Running on Empty (1977), recorded entirely on tour, became his biggest commercial success. Breaking the usual conventions for a live album, Browne used only new material and combined live concert performances with recordings made on buses, in hotel rooms, and backstage. Running on Empty contains some of his most popular songs, including the title track and "The Load-Out/Stay", Browne's send-off to concert audiences and tribute to his roadies.

=== Activism and music ===
In spring of 1978, Browne appeared near a nuclear reprocessing plant in Barnwell, South Carolina, to perform a free concert the night before a civil disobedience action; he did not participate in the action. In June 1978 he performed on the grounds of the Seabrook Station Nuclear Power Plant construction site in New Hampshire for 20,000 opponents of the reactor.

Shortly after the Three Mile Island nuclear accident, during March 1979, Browne joined with several musician friends to found the antinuclear organization Musicians United for Safe Energy. He was arrested while protesting against the Diablo Canyon Power Plant near San Luis Obispo. His next album, Hold Out (1980), was commercially successful and his only number 1 record on the U.S. pop albums chart. In 1982, he released the single "Somebody's Baby" from the Fast Times at Ridgemont High soundtrack, which became his biggest hit, peaking at number 7 on the Billboard Hot 100. The 1983 Lawyers in Love followed, signaling a change in lyrics from the personal to the political. In 1985, he duetted with Clarence Clemons on "You're a Friend of Mine".

Political protest featured in Browne's 1986 album, Lives in the Balance, explicitly condemning U.S. policy in Central America. Flavored with new instrumental textures, it was a huge success with fans, although less so with mainstream audiences. The title track was used at several points in the award-winning 1987 PBS documentary, The Secret Government: The Constitution in Crisis, by journalist Bill Moyers.

During the 1980s, Browne performed frequently at benefits for causes he supported, including Farm Aid, Amnesty International (making several appearances on the 1986 A Conspiracy of Hope tour), post-Somoza revolutionary Nicaragua, and the Christic Institute. The album World in Motion, released in 1989, contains a cover of Steven Van Zandt's "I am a Patriot".

Browne also performed alongside Roy Orbison in A Black and White Night in 1988 along with Bruce Springsteen and k.d. lang, among others.

=== 1990s ===
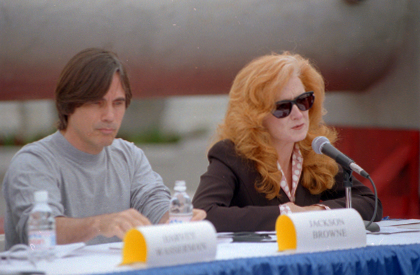
Browne with Bonnie Raitt at a 1997 press conference opposing the proposed Yucca Mountain nuclear waste repository

Browne wrote and recorded the song "The Rebel Jesus" with the Chieftains for their 1991 Christmas album The Bells of Dublin. In 1993, Browne released I'm Alive, a critically acclaimed album with a more personal style that did respectable business despite lacking a hit single. In 1994 he collaborated with Kathy Mattea on "Rock Me on the Water" for an AIDS benefit album Red Hot + Country produced by the Red Hot Organization.

He sang a duet in 1995 with Jann Arden, "Unloved", on her album Living Under June. Browne's own album, Looking East (1996), was released soon after, but was unsuccessful commercially.

=== 2000s ===
Browne released his first album in six years, The Naked Ride Home, in 2002, supporting it with an appearance on Austin City Limits. He guested as himself in The Simpsons episode "Brake My Wife, Please" in 2003, performing a parody of his song "Rosie" with lyrics altered to reference the plot.

In 2003, three of his albums, For Everyman, Late for the Sky, and The Pretender, were selected by Rolling Stone on its list of the 500 best albums of all time. In 2004, Browne was inducted into the Rock and Roll Hall of Fame. Bruce Springsteen gave the induction speech, commenting to Browne that although Eagles were inducted first, "You wrote the songs they wished they had written."

Browne appeared in several rallies for presidential candidate Ralph Nader in 2000, singing "I Am a Patriot" and other songs. He participated in the Vote for Change tour in 2004, playing a series of concerts organized by MoveOn.org to mobilize people voters for John Kerry in the presidential election. In 2006, Browne performed with Michael Stanley and JD Souther at a fundraiser for Democratic candidates in Ohio. In the 2008 presidential election, he endorsed John Edwards for the Democratic presidential nomination and performed at some of Edwards's appearances. After Barack Obama won the nomination, Browne supported him. Browne also performed at the Occupy Wall Street presence at Zuccotti Park in Lower Manhattan in 2011 to show support for their cause.

Solo Acoustic, Vol. 1, was released in 2005, consisting of live recordings of eleven previously released tracks including "The Birds of St. Marks", which dated to 1967. Solo Acoustic, Vol. 1 was nominated for a Grammy in 2007 in the category of Best Contemporary Folk/Americana Album. A live follow-up, Solo Acoustic, Vol. 2, was released in 2008.

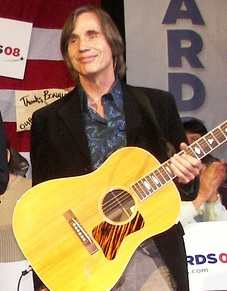
Browne campaigning for presidential candidate John Edwards at a fundraising event in 2008

Browne is part of the No Nukes group which is against the expansion of nuclear power. In 2007, the group recorded a music video of a new version of the Buffalo Springfield song "For What It's Worth". Browne made a cameo appearance in the 2007 film, Walk Hard: The Dewey Cox Story.

Browne's thirteenth studio album, Time the Conqueror, was released in 2008. It peaked at No. 20, which was his first top-20 album since Lawyers in Love in 1983. (The album also reached No. 2 on the Billboard Independent Albums chart.)

In 2008, Browne sued John McCain, the Ohio Republican Party, and the Republican National Committee for using his 1977 hit, "Running on Empty" without his permission for an ad against Barack Obama. In 2009, the matter was settled under an undisclosed financial agreement with an apology from the McCain campaign and other relevant parties.

In 2008, he appeared on the ALMA Awards in a taped interview honoring Trailblazer Award recipient and long-time friend Linda Ronstadt. That same year, Browne performed at the Artist for the Arts Foundation benefit at the Santa Monica High School. Playing with Heart, and over 70 members of the Santa Monica High School Orchestra and Girls Choir, the event provided funds for the continuation of music education in public schools. Browne again appeared there with Heart and other guest stars the following year.

=== 2010s ===
In 2010, Browne covered "Waterloo Sunset" with Ray Davies for Davies' album See My Friends. In 2011, he won the 10th Annual Independent Music Awards in the Best Live Performance Album category for Love Is Strange: En Vivo Con Tino, performed by himself and David Lindley. Browne contributed a cover of Buddy Holly's "True Love Ways" for a 2011 tribute, Listen to Me: Buddy Holly. In 2012, he joined artists including David Crosby and Pete Seeger in supporting Ben Cohen's Stamp Stampede campaign to legally stamp messages such as "Not to Be Used for Bribing Politicians" on American currency to build a movement to amend the U. S. Constitution to get big money out of American politics.

In 2014, a 23-song, two-disc set titled Looking into You: A Tribute to Jackson Browne was released. It features covers of Browne's songs by such artists as Bruce Springsteen, Don Henley, Lyle Lovett, and Bonnie Raitt. In 2014, Browne's 14th studio album, Standing in the Breach, was released. In January 2016, Browne endorsed Bernie Sanders for President of the United States.

In 2016, at the 58th Annual Grammy Awards, Browne and the Eagles performed "Take It Easy" in honor of Glenn Frey a month after his death. Browne played himself and sang in an episode of the Showtime series Roadies.

=== 2020s ===
In 2020, Browne released "A Little Soon to Say" as a single. The following month he released another single, "Downhill from Everywhere". Browne's fifteenth frontline album, Downhill from Everywhere, was slated to be released on his 72nd birthday, October 9, 2020, but was delayed due to the COVID-19 pandemic. A U.S. tour with James Taylor, which was to take place in 2020, was likewise rescheduled to 2021. In 2021, Browne collaborated with Phoebe Bridgers for a new version of her song "Kyoto", exclusively for Spotify. Downhill from Everywhere was released in 2021.

=== 2024–2025 ===
In 2025, Browne was named an inductee of the Folk Americana Roots Hall of Fame (FAR-HOF) as part of its annual class honoring artists whose work has significantly shaped the folk, roots, and Americana traditions. The induction recognized Browne's long-standing contributions as a songwriter and performer whose career has spanned more than five decades. That same year, Browne was also announced as an honoree and featured performer at a benefit concert organized by Music Will a U.S.-based nonprofit organization dedicated to expanding access to music education in public schools. His participation aligned with his long history of involvement in educational and humanitarian causes. In March 2025, Browne joined the lineup for the 38th Annual Tibet House US Benefit Concert at Carnegie Hall in New York City, an event that raises funds for the preservation of Tibetan culture and features a rotating roster of prominent musicians and artists. Browne's live performance activity remained steady throughout 2025. By mid-year, multiple concert appearances were scheduled in cities including Las Vegas and New York, reflecting an ongoing return to regular public performances following a period dominated by benefit and tribute appearances. Contemporary coverage noted that while Browne had not embarked on a full-length national tour at that point in the year, he had continued to perform selectively at high-profile charitable, tribute, and special-event concerts, gradually assembling a broader slate of live dates for the remainder of 2025.

== Personal life ==
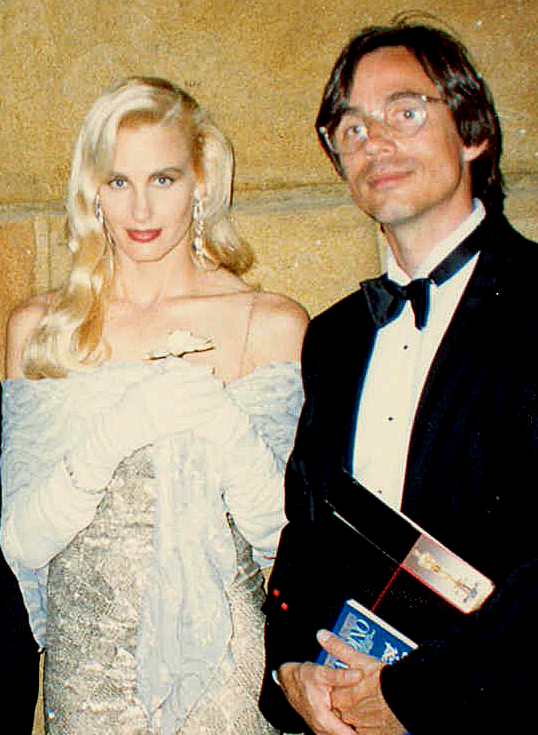
Browne and Daryl Hannah, 1988

Browne has been married twice and had two children. His first wife was actress and model Phyllis Major. Their son, model and actor Ethan Zane Browne, was born in 1973 and grew up in Los Angeles. Jackson and six-month-old Ethan appeared together on the cover of Rolling Stone magazine in 1974. Jackson Browne and Phyllis Major married in 1975. She died of suicide at age 30 after consuming an overdose of barbiturates in March 1976. Ethan died on November 25, 2025, at the age of 52 due to an overdose of fentanyl, methamphetamine, and lidocaine.

In 1981, Browne married model Lynne Sweeney. Their son, Ryan Browne, born a year later, has been a member of Sonny and the Sunsets since 2007. Browne and Lynne Sweeney divorced in 1983 when he started dating Daryl Hannah. That relationship ended in 1992 after she accused him of domestic violence. He dated artist and environmental activist Dianna Cohen through the mid-2000s. He has one grandson.

=== Environmental activism ===
Browne was active in the anti-nuclear movement in the United States, and co-founded MUSE (Musicians United for Safe Energy) with Bonnie Raitt and John Hall in 1979. He was also an active member of the Abalone Alliance and Alliance for Survival. According to environmental activist Ed Begley Jr., "He's got this big wind turbine, and his ranch is completely off the grid", Begley said. "He's done all of it himself."

Browne campaigns against unnecessary use of single-use plastic water bottles and takes steps to reduce usage on his tours. He is part of the movement "Plastic Free Backstage". In 2008, the Surf Industry Manufacturers Association gave Browne the honor of "Environmentalist of the Year".

Browne received the Duke LEAF Award for Lifetime Environmental Achievement in the Fine Arts in 2010 for his environmental activism and efforts to make his tours more "green". Save Our Shores (SOS), an ocean-advocacy group in California, honored Browne with their Ocean Hero Award on February 23, 2011. The mayor of Santa Cruz, California, Ryan Coonerty, proclaimed the date "Jackson Browne Day" in Santa Cruz to honor Browne's social, environmental, and antiplastic activism. Browne also attended the TEDx Great Pacific Garbage Patch conference, performing a new song, "If I Could Be Anywhere", lamenting mankind's destruction of the earth.

=== Charity ===
Browne performed live and recorded the Beatles medley "Golden Slumbers"/"Carry That Weight" in 1991 with Jennifer Warnes for the charity album For Our Children to benefit the Pediatric AIDS Foundation. Browne and Warnes again performed it live for a benefit concert in Tucson.

On November 8 and 9, 1992, Browne appeared in Honolulu with Bonnie Raitt and Crosby, Stills & Nash in a benefit concert for the victims of Hurricane Iniki, which devastated the island of Kauai two months earlier.

Browne performed and sang the role of the Scarecrow in The Wizard of Oz in Concert: Dreams Come True, a 1995 musical performance for charity alongside Roger Daltrey, Natalie Cole, Nathan Lane, and other stars. The celebrity cast performed a reader's theatre and songs-styled performance of the MGM film The Wizard of Oz at the Lincoln Center as a benefit for the Children's Defense Fund. The performance was shown on TNT and issued on CD and video by Rhino Records.

Browne covered John Lennon's "Oh My Love" to benefit Amnesty International's campaign to alleviate the crisis in Darfur. The song appears on the album Instant Karma: The Amnesty International Campaign to Save Darfur, which was released on June 12, 2007, and features many other artists performing other Lennon covers, such as R.E.M., Jack Johnson, U2, Avril Lavigne, Green Day, and the Black Eyed Peas.

In 2008, Browne contributed to the album Songs for Tibet, an initiative to support the Dalai Lama, Tenzin Gyatso, and to publicize the human rights situation in Tibet.

Browne covered Lowen & Navarro's "Weight of the World" on Keep The Light Alive: Celebrating The Music of Lowen & Navarro (2009). The proceeds of the album benefit The Eric Lowen Trust, ALS Association Greater Los Angeles, and Augie's Quest. Browne also held a benefit concert for the Rory David Deutsch Foundation which is dedicated to providing funding for brain tumor research and treatment.

In October 2010, Browne performed at both days of the 24th annual Bridge School Benefit concert, a yearly fundraiser established by Neil Young. The Bridge School assists children with severe physical impairments and complex communication needs. Browne also appeared at the 2010 NAMM Show in Anaheim, California, with Yoko Ono and Quincy Jones in support of the John Lennon Educational Tour Bus.

In 2011, Browne, David Crosby, Graham Nash, and Alice Cooper performed at a benefit in Tucson to benefit The Fund For Civility, Respect, and Understanding, a foundation that raises awareness of and provides medical prevention and treatment services to people with mental disorders. The concert also benefited victims of the January 8, 2011, shootings in Tucson. In 2013, Browne performed with the Kings of Leon and the Flaming Lips in Oklahoma City for Rock for Oklahoma, a benefit concert for Oklahoma tornado victims.

In 2012, Browne performed for Artists for the Arts benefit with Glen Phillips of Toad the Wet Sprocket and the band Venice. The benefit was to keep arts and music in public schools funded and raised over $100,000. This was Browne's fifth appearance out of the nine annual shows that have taken place. In addition to their own set, Venice performed all supporting music along with a student orchestra and choir from the Santa Monica High and Malibu High school districts. The concert, held at Barnum Hall, was a sold-out event.

In 2013, Browne performed with students from School of Rock West LA and Burbank in a benefit concert for the Rock School Scholarship Fund, at the legendary Troubadour in West Hollywood. His set of hits including "Somebody's Baby", "Doctor My Eyes", and "Take It Easy" were all performed with students aged 13 to 17 accompanying him. Money raised went toward scholarships for children who want to attend any music school in the US but whose parents do not have the financial means.

In 2014, Browne appeared at the Arlington Theatre in Santa Barbara, California, in a benefit concert for Sanctuary Centers of Santa Barbara, a nonprofit providing mental health and co-occurring disorders treatment services. Jeff Bridges and David Crosby also performed. In 2015, Browne played a second concert for Sanctuary Centers at the Santa Barbara Bowl.

Browne provides exclusive music tracks for various charity and benefit albums, including Safety Harbor Kids Holiday Collection (where he sang the Johnny Marks holiday song "Silver and Gold" with longtime friend Lowell George's daughter, Inara George). Browne provided a live version of "Drums of War" for The People Speak Soundtrack. Other charity albums he has contributed to include: Acordes Con Leonard Cohen (song: "A Thousand Kisses Deep"), From Wharf Rats to Lords of the Docks Soundtrack (song: "Step By Step"), Shrink (the Kevin Spacey film soundtrack; song: "Here"), Keep the Light Alive: Celebrating the Music of Eric Lowen and Dan Navarro (song: "Weight of the World"), and 1% for the Planet: The Music, Vol. 1 (a live version of "About My Imagination"), as well as many benefit concert and other appearances.

In March 2025, Browne joined the lineup for the 38th Annual Tibet House US Benefit Concert at Carnegie Hall in New York City. The long-running event is dedicated to supporting the preservation of Tibetan culture and scholarship through music and the arts. Browne's participation placed him alongside a broad group of artists and cultural figures contributing to the cause. Later in 2025, Browne was also named among the honorees and featured performers at a gala benefit concert organized by Music Will, a U.S.-based nonprofit that works to expand access to music education in public schools. Together, these appearances reflected Browne's continued use of his public platform in support of nonprofit and cultural-advocacy initiatives, ranging from international heritage preservation to domestic education programs.

In 2024, Browne was announced as a performer at the 10th annual "John Henry's Friends" benefit concert, an event held to raise funds for services supporting children and young adults diagnosed with autism. That same year, he also participated in the Centennial Celebration Concert presented by the Lobero Theatre Foundation, marking the 100th anniversary of the reopening of the historic Lobero Theatre. His involvement highlighted support for both community health causes and arts and heritage preservation initiatives.

== Awards and honors ==
=== Grammy Awards ===
Browne has been nominated eight times for Grammy Awards.

Grammy Awards
Year	Work	Award	Result	Ref
1979	Running on Empty	Album of the Year	Nominated	
1979	Running on Empty	Best Pop Vocal Performance, Male	Nominated	
1981	"Boulevard"	Best Rock Vocal Performance, Male	Nominated	
1995	"I'm Alive (Jackson Browne album)"	Grammy Award for Best Engineered Album, Non-Classical	Nominated	
1999	"Kisses Sweeter than Wine" (with Bonnie Raitt)	Best Pop Collaboration with Vocals	Nominated	
2007	Solo Acoustic, Vol. 1	Best Contemporary Folk Album	Nominated	
2011	Love Is Strange: En Vivo Con Tino	Best Contemporary Folk Album	Nominated	
2022	Downhill from Everywhere	Best Americana Album	Nominated	

=== Other honors and recognitions ===
In 2002, Browne received the John Steinbeck Award, given to artists who exemplify the environmental and social values in which Steinbeck believed. On March 14, 2004, Browne was inducted into the Rock and Roll Hall of Fame by Bruce Springsteen. Also in 2004, Browne was named an honorary Doctorate of Music by Occidental College in Los Angeles for "a remarkable musical career that has successfully combined an intensely personal artistry with a broader vision of social justice."

For "promoting peace and justice through his music and his unrelenting support for that which promotes nonviolent solutions to problems both nationally and internationally", Browne received the Courage of Conscience Awards from The Peace Abbey in Sherborn, Massachusetts. In 2007, Browne was awarded the Chapin-World Hunger Year Harry Chapin Humanitarian Award. In 2007, he was inducted into the Songwriters Hall of Fame.

In 2008, Browne received the NARM Harry Chapin Humanitarian Award. and the Golden Plate Award of the American Academy of Achievement in recognition of his lifetime in the arts and dedication as a social activist. His award was presented by Awards Council member Senator Tom Daschle. In 2010, Browne received the We Are Family Humanitarian Award.

Browne was the 2014 recipient of the GRAMMY Museum Jane Ortner Education Award. In 2018, he was the first artist to receive the Gandhi Peace Award from the organization Promoting Enduring Peace. In 2024, Browne was honored with the American Music Honors from the Bruce Springsteen Archives and Center for American Music celebrating artists who have demonstrated artistic excellence, creative integrity, and a longstanding commitment to the value of music in our national consciousness.

== Discography ==
- Jackson Browne (1972)
- For Everyman (1973)
- Late for the Sky (1974)
- The Pretender (1976)
- Running on Empty (1977)
- Hold Out (1980)
- Lawyers in Love (1983)
- Lives in the Balance (1986)
- World in Motion (1989)
- I'm Alive (1993)
- Looking East (1996)
- The Naked Ride Home (2002)
- Time the Conqueror (2008)
- Standing in the Breach (2014)
- Downhill from Everywhere (2021)

== General and cited references ==
- Bego, Mark (2005). Jackson Browne: His Life and Music. Citadel Press. ISBN 978-0-8065-2642-3. OCLC 58555463.
