= Thelma Houston discography =

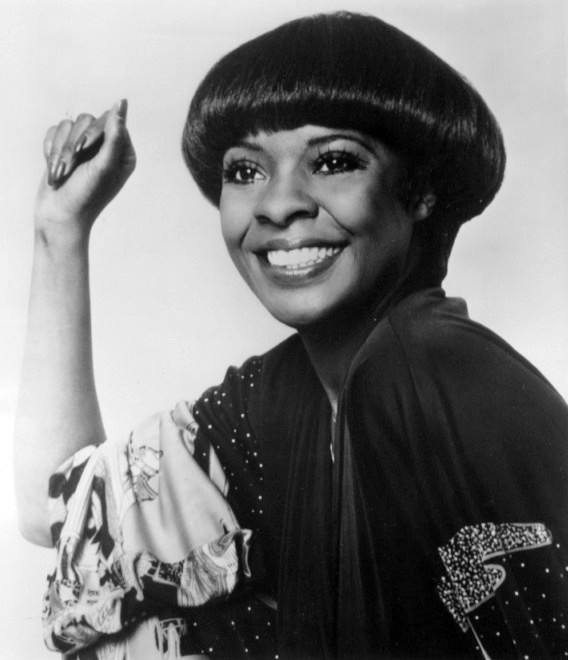
- Houston in 1977
- Studio albums: 17
- Live albums: 1
- Compilation albums: 5
- Singles: 56

This is the discography of American singer Thelma Houston.

== Albums ==
=== Studio albums ===
Title	Album details	Peak chart positions					
Title	Album details	US	US R&B	AUS	GER	CAN	SWE
Sunshower	Released: June 1969; Label: ABC/Dunhill; Formats: LP, 8-track, reel-to-reel	—	50	—	—	—	—
Thelma Houston	Released: July 1972; Label: MoWest; Formats: LP	—	—	—	—	—	—
I've Got the Music in Me	Released: December 1975; Label: Sheffield Lab; Formats: LP; With Pressure Cooker	—	—	—	—	—	—
Any Way You Like It	Released: October 28, 1976; Label: Tamla; Formats: LP, MC, 8-track	11	5	18	25	9	21
Thelma & Jerry	Released: June 1977; Label: Motown; Formats: LP, MC, 8-track; With Jerry Butler	53	20	—	—	—	—
The Devil in Me	Released: October 18, 1977; Label: Tamla; Formats: LP, MC, 8-track	64	29	—	—	64	—
Two to One	Released: June 1978; Label: Motown; Formats: LP, MC; With Jerry Butler	—	—	—	—	—	—
Ready to Roll	Released: October 20, 1978; Label: Tamla; Formats: LP, MC, 8-track	—	74	—	—	—	—
Ride to the Rainbow	Released: May 22, 1979; Label: Tamla; Formats: LP, MC, 8-track	—	—	—	—	—	—
Breakwater Cat	Released: January 1980; Label: RCA Victor; Formats: LP, MC	—	—	—	—	—	—
Never Gonna Be Another One	Released: May 1981; Label: RCA Victor; Formats: LP, MC, 8-track	144	51	—	—	—	—
Reachin' All Around	Released: 1982; Label: Motown; Formats: LP	—	—	—	—	—	—
Thelma Houston	Released: March 1983; Label: MCA; Formats: LP, MC	—	—	—	—	—	—
Qualifying Heat	Released: December 1984; Label: MCA; Formats: LP, MC	—	30	—	—	—	—
Throw You Down	Released: October 1990; Label: Reprise; Formats: CD, LP, MC	—	—	—	—	—	—
Thelma Houston	Released: 1994; Label: Fonit Cetra; Formats: CD, MC; Italy-only release	—	—	—	—	—	—
A Woman's Touch	Released: August 14, 2007; Label: Shout! Factory; Formats: CD	—	—	—	—	—	—
"—" denotes releases that did not chart or were not released in that territory.

=== Live albums ===
Title	Album details
Divas of Disco: Live	Released: February 26, 2010; Label: Pegasus Entertainment; Formats: CD; With CeCe Peniston, Linda Clifford, A Taste of Honey and France Joli

=== Compilation albums ===
Title	Album details
Thelma Houston	Released: 1981; Label: Motown; Formats: LP, MC
Best of Thelma Houston	Released: May 1991; Label: Motown; Formats: CD, MC
Don't Leave Me This Way	Released: 1995; Label: Spectrum; Formats: CD
The Best of Thelma Houston	Released: August 1998; Label: Spectrum Music; Formats: CD
The Best of Thelma Houston	Released: June 2007; Label: Universal Music; Formats: CD

== Singles ==
Title	Year	Peak chart positions										Certifications	Album
Title	Year	US	US Dance	US R&B	AUS	BEL (FL)	BEL (WA)	CAN	NL	NZ	UK	Certifications	Album
"Baby Mine"	1966	—	—	—	—	—	—	—	—	—	—		Non-album singles
"Don't Cry My Soldier Boy"	1967	—	—	—	—	—	—	—	—	—	—		Non-album singles
"If This Was the Last Song"	1969	—	—	—	—	—	—	—	—	—	—		Sunshower
"Jumpin' Jack Flash"	1969	—	—	—	—	—	—	—	—	—	—		Sunshower
"Save the Country"	1969	74	—	—	—	—	—	74	—	—	—		Non-album singles
"I Just Wanna Be Me" (UK-only release)	1970	—	—	—	—	—	—	—	—	—	—		Non-album singles
"Ride, Louie, Ride"	1970	—	—	—	—	—	—	—	—	—	—		Non-album singles
"I Want to Go Back There Again"	1971	—	—	—	—	—	—	—	—	—	—		Non-album singles
"Me and Bobby McGee"	1972	—	—	—	—	—	—	—	—	—	—		Thelma Houston
"No One's Gonna Be a Fool Forever"	1972	—	—	—	—	—	—	—	—	—	56 (Note: Chart position is from the UK "Breakers List".)		Thelma Houston
"Piano Man"	1973	—	—	—	44	—	—	—	—	—	—		Non-album singles
"Do You Know Where You're Going To" (New Zealand-only release)	1973	—	—	—	—	—	—	—	—	—	—		Non-album singles
"You've Been Doing Wrong for So Long"	1974	—	—	64	—	—	—	—	—	—	—		Non-album singles
"The Bingo Long Song (Steal on Home)"	1976	—	—	—	—	—	—	—	—	—	—		Non-album singles
"One Out of Every Six"	1976	—	—	—	—	—	—	—	—	—	—		Non-album singles
"Don't Leave Me This Way"	1976	1	1 (Note: "Don't Leave Me This Way" and "Anyway You Like It" jointly topped the Billboard Dance Club Songs chart.)	1	6	7	1	4	4	17	13	BPI: Silver; MC: Gold	Any Way You Like It
"If It's the Last Thing I Do"	1977	47	—	12	—	—	—	81	—	—	—		Any Way You Like It
"Anyway You Like It" (Netherlands and France-only release)	1977	—	1	—	—	—	—	—	—	—	—		Any Way You Like It
"It's a Lifetime Thing" (with Jerry Butler)	1977	—	—	84	—	—	—	—	—	—	—		Thelma & Jerry
"I'm Here Again"	1977	—	18	21	—	—	49	—	—	—	—		The Devil in Me
"I Can't Go On Living Without Your Love"	1978	—	—	—	—	—	—	—	—	—	—		The Devil in Me
"Don't Know Why I Love You" (Netherlands and Germany-only release)	1978	—	—	—	—	—	—	—	—	—	—		Any Way You Like It
"I'm Not Strong Enough to Love You Again"	1978	—	—	—	—	—	—	—	—	—	—		Two to One
"Don't Pity Me" (UK-only release)	1978	—	—	—	—	—	—	—	—	—	—		Two to One
"Saturday Night, Sunday Morning"	1979	34	33	19	—	—	—	38	—	14	—		Ride to the Rainbow
"Suspicious Minds"	1980	—	—	—	—	—	—	—	—	—	—		Breakwater Cat
"If You Feel It"	1981	—	6	35	—	19	—	—	42	—	48		Never Gonna Be Another One
"96 Tears"	1981	—	22	76	—	—	—	—	—	—	—		Never Gonna Be Another One
"Working Girl"	1983	—	—	46	—	—	—	—	—	—	—		Thelma Houston
"Just Like All the Rest"	1983	—	—	80	—	—	—	—	—	—	—		Thelma Houston
"(I Guess) It Must Be Love"	1984	—	—	59	—	—	—	—	—	—	80		Qualifying Heat
"You Used to Hold Me So Tight"	1984	—	7	13	—	—	—	—	—	—	49		Qualifying Heat
"I'd Rather Spend the Bad Times with You Than Spend the Good Times with Someone New"	1985	—	4	—	—	—	—	—	—	—	—		Qualifying Heat
"Fantasy and Heartbreak"	1985	—	—	—	—	—	—	—	—	—	—		Qualifying Heat
"Lean on Me" (with the Winans)	1989	—	—	73	—	—	—	—	—	—	—		Lean on Me (soundtrack)
"High"	1990	—	—	66	—	—	—	—	—	—	—		Throw You Down
"Out of My Hands"	1990	—	—	82	—	—	—	—	—	—	—		Throw You Down
"Throw You Down"	1990	—	5	—	—	—	—	—	—	—	—		Throw You Down
"Hold On"	1990	—	—	—	—	—	—	—	—	—	—		Non-album singles
"Keep the Candle Burning" (Mathou featuring Thelma Houston)	1993	—	—	—	—	—	—	—	—	—	—		Non-album singles
"Don't Leave Me This Way" (remix)	1994	—	19	—	83	—	—	—	—	—	35		Thelma Houston
"I Need Somebody Tonight"	1996	—	—	—	—	—	—	—	—	—	195		Non-album singles
"All of That"	1996	—	—	—	—	—	—	—	—	—	—		Non-album singles
"Don't Leave Me This Way" (Soultans featuring Thelma Houston)	2002	—	—	—	—	—	—	—	—	—	—		Non-album singles
"I Need Somebody" (Sessomatto featuring Thelma Houston)	2003	—	—	—	—	—	—	—	—	—	—		Non-album singles
"Brand New Day"	2007	—	—	—	—	—	—	—	—	—	—		A Woman's Touch
"Regrets"	2011	—	—	—	—	—	—	—	—	—	—		Summer Nights
"Slippin' Up Slippin' Around"	2011	—	—	—	—	—	—	—	—	—	—		Summer Nights
"Gliding on Love"	2011	—	—	—	—	—	—	—	—	—	—		Non-album singles
"Enemy" (with Janitor)	2013	—	—	—	—	—	—	—	—	—	—		Non-album singles
"Leave My Baby" (Joe T. Vannelli featuring Thelma Houston)	2017	—	—	—	—	—	—	—	—	—	—		Non-album singles
"I Still Love You" (featuring Rodney Houston)	2019	—	—	—	—	—	—	—	—	—	—		Non-album singles
"Oh Happy Day" (with CeCe Peniston & Phoebe Snow)	2019	—	—	—	—	—	—	—	—	—	—		Non-album singles
"Turn Your World Around" (with Bimbo Jones)	2020	—	7	—	—	—	—	—	—	—	—		Non-album singles
"Someone Is Standing Outside" (featuring Jimmy Webb)	2020	—	—	—	—	—	—	—	—	—	—		Non-album singles
"I Still Love You" (featuring E. White)	2021	—	—	—	—	—	—	—	—	—	—		Non-album singles
"—" denotes releases that did not chart or were not released in that territory.
