= Thelma Houston (disambiguation) =

Thelma Houston (born 1946) is an American singer and actress. It may also refer to:

- Thelma Houston (1972 album)
- Thelma Houston (1983 album)
