= Luis Conte =

Cuban percussionist (born 1954)

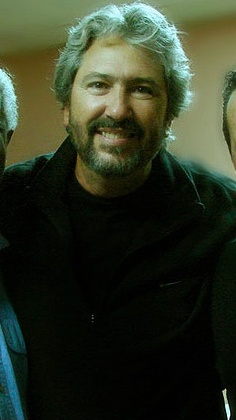
- Conte in 2008

Background information
- Born: Luis Cristóbal Conte; 16 November 1954 (age 71); Santiago de Cuba, Cuba
- Occupation: Musician
- Instrument: Percussion
- Website: www.luisconte.com

Luis Cristóbal Conte (born 16 November 1954) is a Cuban percussionist best known for his performances in the bands of artists including James Taylor, Madonna, Pat Metheny Group, Eric Clapton, Carlos Santana, Phil Collins, Rod Stewart and Shakira. He began his music career as a studio musician for Latin Jazz acts like Caldera. Conte's live performance and touring career took off when he joined Madonna's touring band in the 1980s. Neil Strauss of The New York Times describes Conte's playing as "grazing Latin-style percussion".

Conte immigrated to Los Angeles in 1967, where he attended Los Angeles City College studying music, and entrenched himself in the music community. Conte's career includes composing and playing in ABC TV's Dancing with the Stars band, along with many TV and film projects.

== Early life ==
Conte was born in Santiago de Cuba. As a child, Conte began his musical odyssey playing the guitar. However, he soon switched to percussion, and that has remained his primary instrument ever since.

He was sent to Los Angeles by his parents in 1967, in order to prevent him from being forced to serve in the Cuban military. This was a turning point in Conte's life, as the musical community in Los Angeles during this period was quite vibrant. It was during this period that he studied at Los Angeles City College.

== Musical career ==
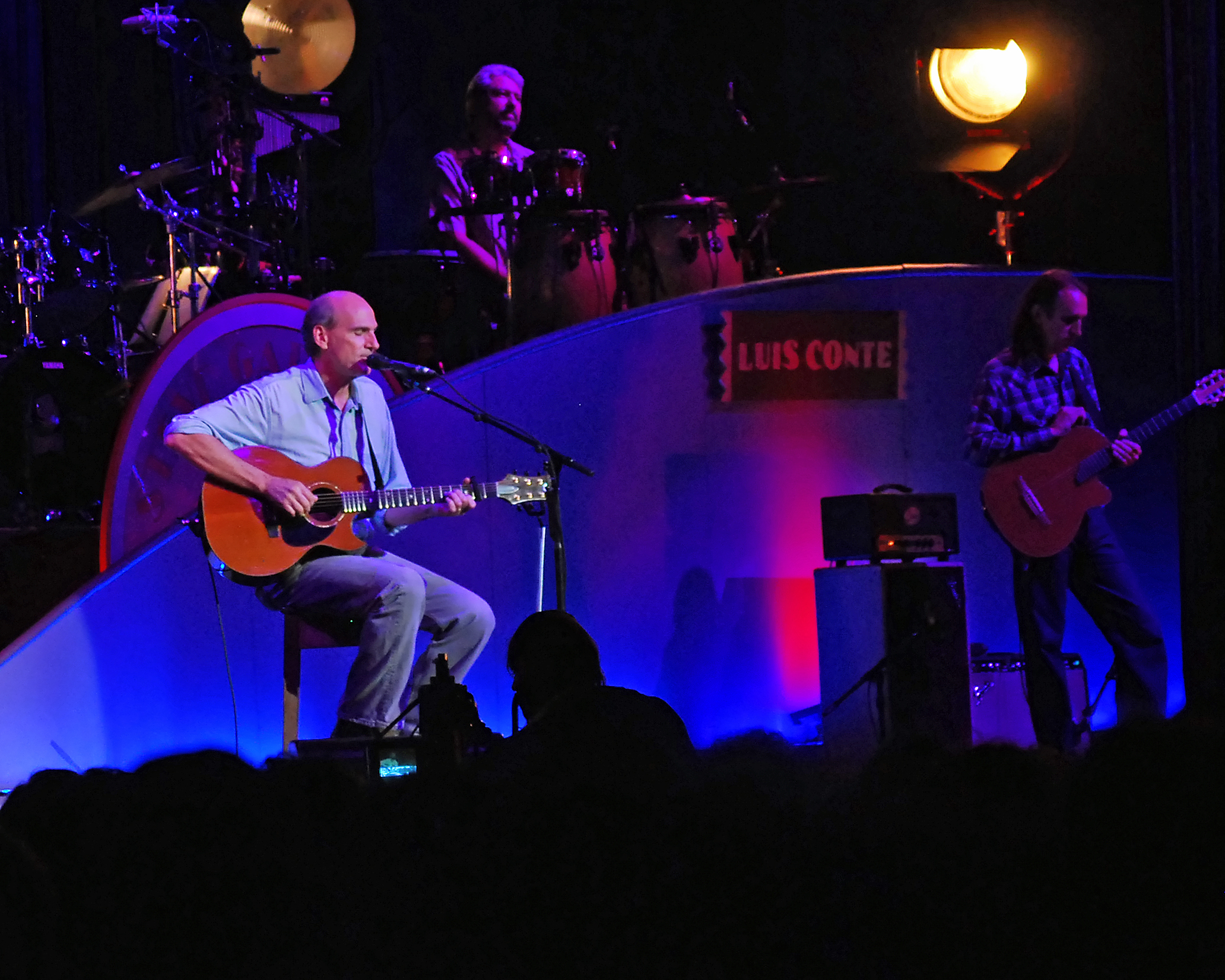
Luis Conte (rear), plays with James Taylor's "Band of Legends."

Conte proved himself versatile musically, and by 1973 he was playing regularly in local clubs. He quickly became a busy studio musician, and throughout the 1970s he played in the Latin jazz band Caldera.

In the 1980s, Conte toured with several different musicians including Madonna, guitarist Al Di Meola, and Andy Narell. His debut as a bandleader came in 1987 when he released La Cocina Caliente, which included a Latinized version of Chopin's "Susarasa". Conte also played percussion on the Pat Metheny Group release 'We Live Here' in 1995, on the Pat Metheny album 'From This Place' in 2020, and Side-Eye III+ in 2026, as well as I Mother Earth's first two albums Dig (1993) and Scenery and Fish (1996).

Conte has toured as part of James Taylor's "Band of Legends." He has also played alongside musicians including Alex Acuña, Jaguares, Larry Klimas, and David Garfield, both as a bandleader and a sideman.

Luis Conte was part of Phil Collins' 1997 "Dance into the Light" tour and 2004 "First Farewell Tour", performing Afro-Cuban percussion in both of them and adding more depth into the concert songs. He also performed during The Phil Collins Big Band tours in 1996 and 1998, and again during the Phil Collins Not Dead Yet tours in 2017–2018.

In 1999 Conte collaborated in the Maná MTV Unplugged project.

In 2009, Conte worked together with Sergio Vallín in his Bendito Entre Las Mujeres album.

== Discography ==
=== As leader/co-leader ===
- La Cocina Caliente (Denon, 1987)
- Black Forest (Denon, 1989)
- The Road (Weber Works, 1995)
- Cuban Dreams (Unitone Recording, 2000)
- The Latin Jazz Trio (AIX Records, 2000) AIX website
- En Casa De Luis (BFM Jazz, 2011)

=== As sideman (in alphabetical order) ===
With Peter Allen

- Making Every Moment Count (RCA Records, 1990)

With Anastacia

- Not That Kind (Epic Records, 2000)

With Angelica

- Angelica (Arista Records, 1997)

With Paul Anka

- Rock Swings (Verve, 2005)

With Patti Austin

- On the Way to Love (Warner Bros. Records, 2001)
- Sound Advice (Shanachie Records, 2011)

With George Benson

- Absolute Benson (Verve, 2000)

With Michelle Branch

- Hotel Paper (Maverick Records, 2003)

With Michel Jonasz

- Où est la Source (Sony Music, 1992)

With Jackson Browne

- I'm Alive (Elektra Records, 1993)
- Looking East (Elektra Records, 1996)
- The Naked Ride Home (Elektra Records, 2002)
- Standing in the Breach (Inside Recordings, 2014)

With George Cables

- Shared Secrets (MuseFX, 2001)

With Glen Campbell

- Meet Glen Campbell (Capitol Records, 2008)

With Belinda Carlisle

- Runaway Horses (MCA Records, 1989)
- Live Your Life Be Free (MCA Records, 1991)

With Steven Curtis Chapman

- All About Love (Sparrow Records, 2003)

With Cher

- Love Hurts (Geffen, 1991)

With Chicago

- Night & Day: Big Band (Giant, 1995)

With Toni Childs

- House of Hope (A&M Records, 1991)

With Joe Cocker

- Across from Midnight (CMC International, 1997)

With Natalie Cole

- Good to Be Back (Elektra Records, 1989)
- Take a Look (Elektra Records, 1993)

With Phil Collins and The Phil Collins Big Band

- A Hot Night in Paris (Atlantic Records, 1999)
- Phil Collins Live At Montreux, (DVD, 2010)

With Rita Coolidge

- Behind the Memories (Pony Canyon Records, 1995)

With David Crosby

- Thousand Roads (Atlantic Records, 1993)

With Gavin DeGraw

- Gavin DeGraw (J Records, 2008)

With Céline Dion

- Falling into You (Columbia Records, 1996)
- A New Day Has Come (Columbia Records, 2002)
- One Heart (Columbia Records, 2003)

With Lara Fabian

- Lara Fabian (Columbia Records, 1999)

With Clare Fischer

- 2+2 (Pausa Records, 1981)
- And Sometimes Voices (Pausa Records, 1982)

With John Fogerty

- Blue Moon Swamp (Warner Bros. Records, 1997)

With Aretha Franklin

- This Christmas, Aretha (DMI Records, 2008)

With Nelly Furtado

- Loose (Interscope Records, 2006)

With Charlotte Gainsbourg

- IRM (Elektra Records, 2009)

With Goo Goo Dolls

- Dizzy Up the Girl (Warner Bros., 1998)
- Gutterflower (Warner Bros., 2002)

With Josh Groban

- All That Echoes (Reprise Records, 2013)
- Bridges (Reprise Records, 2018)

With Thelma Houston

- Throw You Down (Reprise Records, 1990)
- A Woman's Touch (Shout Factory, 2007)

With Al Jarreau

- Tomorrow Today (GRP, 2000)
- Accentuate the Positive (GRP Records, 2004)

With Jewel

- Spirit (Atlantic Records, 1998)
- Goodbye Alice in Wonderland (Atlantic Records, 2006)

With Elton John

- Duets (Rocket, 1993)

With Gregg Karukas

- Sound Of Emotion (Positive Music Records, 1991)
- Summerhouse (101 South Records, 1994)
- You'll Know It's Me (Fahreheit Records, 1995)
- Blue Touch (i.e. music, 1998)
- Nightshift (N-Coded Music, 2000)
- Heatwave (N-Coded Music, 2002)
- GK (Trippin 'N' Rhythm Records, 2009)

With Chaka Khan

- Funk This (Burgundy Records, 2007)

With Patti LaBelle

- Miss Patti's Christmas (Def Soul Classics, 2007)

With David Lasley

- Soldiers on the Moon (Pony Canyon Records, 1989)

With Julian Lennon

- Mr. Jordan (Virgin Records, 1989)

With Kenny Loggins

- Back to Avalon (Columbia Records, 1988)
- Leap of Faith (Columbia Records, 1991)

With Madonna

- Like a Prayer (Warner Bros. Records, 1989)

With Ziggy Marley

- Dragonfly (Private Music, 2003)
- Love Is My Religion (Tuff Gong Worldwide, 2006)

With Richard Marx

- Paid Vacation (Capitol Records, 1994)

With Christine McVie

- In the Meantime (Sanctuary Records, 2004)

With Bette Midler

- It's the Girls! (Warner Bros. Records, 2014)

With Kylie Minogue

- Rhythm of Love (Mushroom Records, 1990)

With Michael Nesmith

- Tropical Campfires (Pacific Art Corporation, 1992)
- Rays (Pacific Arts Corporation, 2005)

With Jennifer Paige

- Jennifer Paige (Hollywood Records, 1998)

With Bonnie Raitt

- Slipstream (Redwing Records, 2012)

With Emily Remler

- This Is Me (Justice Records, 1990)

With LeAnn Rimes

- Twisted Angel (Curb Records, 2002)

With Linda Ronstadt

- Frenesí (Elektra Records, 1992)

With Brenda Russell

- Kiss Me with the Wind (A&M Records, 1990)
- Soul Talkin' (EMI, 1993)
- Between the Sun and the Moon (Dome Records, 2004)

With Boz Scaggs

- Fade Into Light (MVP Japan, 1996)

With Selena

- Dreaming of You (EMI, 1995)

With Shakira

- Fijación Oral, Vol. 1 (Epic Records, 2005)
- Oral Fixation, Vol. 2 (Epic Records, 2005)

With Vonda Shepard

- Vonda Shepard (Reprise Records, 1989)

With Lisa Stansfield

- Lisa Stansfield (Arista Records, 1997)

With Rod Stewart

- Vagabond Heart (Warner Bros. Records, 1991)

With Curtis Stigers

- Brighter Days (Columbia Records, 1999)

With Barbra Streisand

- Encore: Movie Partners Sing Broadway (Columbia Records, 2016)

With James Taylor

- October Roads (Columbia Records, 2002)
- A Christmas Album (Hallmark Cards, 2004)
- James Taylor at Christmas (Columbia Records, 2006)
- Covers (Hear Music, 2008)
- Other Covers (Hear Music, 2009)
- Before This World (Concord Records, 2015)
- American Standard (Fantasy Records, 2020)

With Terence Trent D'Arby

- Vibrator (Columbia Records, 1995)

With Julieta Venegas

- Bueninvento (RCA International, 2000)

With Roger Waters

- Amused to Death (Columbia Records, 1992)

With Tony Joe White

- Lake Placid Blues (Remark Records, 1995)
- One Hot July (Mercury Records, 1998)

With Deniece Williams

- Special Love (MCA Records, 1989)

With Paul Young

- The Crossing (Columbia Records, 1993)

With Carlos Santana (Supernatural) BMG 2000

With Warren Zevon

- The Wind (Artemis Records, 2003)

== Notes ==
- Yanow, Scott (2000). Afro-Cuban Jazz. San Francisco: Miller Freeman Books. ISBN 0-87930-619-X.
