= Woodstock II =

Woodstock II may refer to:

- Woodstock Two, the second live album from the 1969 festival.
- Woodstock '89, the lesser-known, though technically correct, Woodstock II. It was spontaneous commemoration of the 20th anniversary of Woodstock, having had fewer attendees and lesser-known acts than Woodstock '94.
- Woodstock '94, unofficially named Woodstock II, it was a commemoration of the 25th anniversary of the Woodstock festival.
