= Michel Rubini =

American musician and composer

- Born: December 3, 1942 (age 83); Los Angeles, California, U.S.
- Genres: Pop, R&B, blues, film score
- Occupations: Composer, multi-instrumentalist, record producer, orchestrator, arranger, songwriter
- Instrument: Keyboards
- Formerly of: The Wrecking Crew
- Website: michelrubini.com

Michel Rubini (born December 3, 1942) is an American musician, conductor, arranger, producer, songwriter and composer. A professional classical pianist since early childhood, he was a prolific session musician of the 1960s and '70s, part of a group known as "The Wrecking Crew", and worked with such artists Ray Charles, Frank Zappa, Sonny and Cher and Barbra Streisand. He has also written several film scores, notably for Tony Scott's The Hunger (1983) and Michael Mann's Manhunter (1986), Silhouette (1990) starring Faye Dunaway and the television series Capitol (1982-87), The Hitchhiker (1984-87) and Tales from the Crypt (1990). He is the son of violinist Jan Rubini.

== As a musician ==
As a session player and arranger

Rubini was producer, conductor and arranger for Motown Records. He was one of the most sought-after Los Angeles session players during the 1960s and 1970s, performing on albums by Sonny & Cher (and the hit single "The Beat Goes On"), Loggins and Messina, Michael Parks, the Cats, the Righteous Brothers, and many others. Rubini arranged and conducted Sonny & Chér single "A Cowboy's Work Is Never Done", arranged Cher single "Don't Hide Your Love" and Maureen McGovern single "I Won't Last A Day Without You". Rubini also made numerous television appearances in the house band of the 1980s game shows Face the Music and Name That Tune. Rubini played the organ on "That's Life" by Frank Sinatra and the grand piano on "Strangers in the Night", also by Sinatra.

As a writer

Rubini co-wrote three songs for Thelma Houston: "Give Me Something To Believe In", "Memories", and "I've Got the Devil in Me" – all included on The Devil in Me album. He composed two songs for The New Kids film: "Edge Of Survival" (lyrics and performed by Jess Harnell) and "Over And Over And Over Again" (lyrics and performed by Miriam Cutler).

Solo Career

Rubini, together with Don Dunn, wrote and recorded an album Diggin' It in 1976. During recording session, he played on piano, organ, clavinet, harpsichord, electric piano, and synthesizer. In 1978 a follow-up of sorts was issued under the Motown imprint, this one by Friendly Enemies, a pop trio consisting of Dunn, Rubini, and lead vocalist Chuck Smith. The album Round One also bore the original version of "Baby It's Me", which was recorded by Diana Ross in 1977 (the Enemies' version was made that year, but remained in the can until the 1978 LP release.) In 1988 he recorded his LP album for Gold Castle Records called Secret Dreams. The album was re-recorded, mixed and released on CD by Essence Records in 1994. Rubini recalled:

It was a solo effort on my part, and everything that I played was totally improvised. There was no prearranging, composing or thought other than just letting the music flow out through me onto the tape.

He started playing gospel and blues about age 13, but he wrote, recorded and released his first and, so far, only blues album Band is Tight Tonite in early 1990s. Rubini had said:

I called my 5 favorite blues players, got 6 of my favorite blues/gospel singers from the CME Community Choir, went into the studio and blew it out for 4 days. All live, no overdubs.

Rubini also wrote two instrumental songs, released as a single by Atco, called Summer Song /Moonlight Mood.

== As a film score composer ==
Rubini’s most famous score may be as the composer of the soundtrack to The Hunger, a horror film directed by Tony Scott. This 1983 score is emblematic of dark 1980s electronic music (created using synthesizers and synclavier II) inspired by the work of Krzysztof Penderecki and György Ligeti. In 1985 he composed Graham's Theme for Michael Mann's film Manhunter. The theme composed by Rubini for Manhunter was also dark but more melodic than the score to The Hunger. Rubini collaborated with another Miami Vice alum on Paul Michael Glaser's Band of the Hand, a more traditional score using a shakuhachi. In 1992 Rubini composed the score for Nemesis, a jazz and oriental music fusion with an electronic ensemble. His instrumental music features in the films Panic ("HSML Cha Cha Cha #1", "HSML Bossa Nova Source #1") and Hollywood Homicide ("Lord Made An Angel"). He composed two songs for the 1985 film The New Kids: Edge Of Survival (lyrics written and performed by Jess Harnell) and Over And Over And Over Again (lyrics written and performed by Miriam Cutler). In 1992 he wrote and performed music for the Merlin & The Dragons audiobook by Jane Yolen (read by Kevin Kline).

== As a television score composer ==
Rubini's first television work was as pianist for the Tommy Oliver Orchestra on the 1980 musical game show Face the Music, where he was frequently referred to on-air by host Ron Ely and occasionally performed solo pieces. This was followed by composing music for episodes for the TV series The Hitchhiker beginning in 1983, along with co-scoring the daytime soap opera Capitol and the HBO series Tales from the Crypt. Since 1987, he became successful as a mini-series, HBO special and TV movie composer.

In June 2008, as a member of the Wrecking Crew, a legendary group of studio musicians responsible for backing most of the hits recorded in Los Angeles during the 60’s, Rubini was named on a Plaque with other key players in the group in a ceremony at the Guitar Center WALK OF FAME in Hollywood.

== Discography ==
- Summer Song /Moonlight Mood (Single)
- Diggin it '76 (with Don Dunn)
- Round One (with Don Dunn and Chuck Smith as "Friendly Enemies") 1978
- Secret Dreams
- Band is Tight Tonite

== Soundtracks released ==
- The Hunger (with Danny Jaeger, Howard Blake, and Bauhaus)
- Manhunter (with The Reds, The Prime Movers, Shriekback, Kitarō, and Red 7)
- Band of the Hand (with Bob Dylan)
- Merlin and the Dragons (audiobook, with Kevin Kline)
- Nemesis
