= 221 (disambiguation) =

221 may refer to:

In time:

- The year:
  - 221 AD
  - 221 BC

In mathematics:

- 221 (number)

In geography:

- Roads:
  - U.S. Route 221 in Virginia

In astronomy:

- 221 Eos, a main-belt asteroid

In transportation:

- Aircraft:
  - The Boeing 221 mail plane
- Rail:
  - 221 series, a type of train in Japan

In weapons:

- Firearms:
  - The .221 Remington Fireball pistol cartridge

In fiction:

- 221B Baker Street, the address of Sherlock Holmes
- Experiment 221, the codename for Sparky, a fictional alien character in the Lilo & Stitch franchise

== See also ==
- Two to One (1978 album), album by Thelma Houston
