= You Used to Hold Me =

You Used to Hold Me may refer to:

- "You Used to Hold Me" (Ralphi Rosario song), 1987
- "You Used to Hold Me" (Calvin Harris song), 2010

== See also ==
- "You Used to Hold Me So Tight" by Thelma Houston, 1984
