= Good News in Hard Times =

Studio album by the Sisters of Glory
- Released: August 22, 1995
- Recorded: 1995
- Genre: Gospel
- Length: 68:16
- Label: Warner Bros./WEA (#9 45990)
- Producer: Jennifer Cohen, Lois Walden

CeCe Peniston chronology
Remix Collection (1994)	Good News in Hard Times (1995)	I'm Movin' On (1996)

Good News in Hard Times is the album released by American gospel group the Sisters of Glory, released on August 22, 1995, by Warner Bros. Records. The set included solo performances by five female singers from different musical backgrounds: Thelma Houston, CeCe Peniston, Phoebe Snow, Lois Walden, and Albertina Walker.

The concept of their modern gospel ensemble was initially created by Lois Walden. For the first time, the vocalists performed together on April 25, 1994, at the New York benefit concert named "Gospel Music: From the Church to the Charts". The next gig for the gospel quintet was at the music festival Woodstock '94 on August 14, 1994. Later that year, on December 16, they appeared before Pope John Paul II at the Christmas at the Vatican II concert in Rome. After receiving an offer from Warner Bros management, the Sisters also recorded a studio album in common.

The album, produced by Jennifer Cohen in collaboration with Walden, earned positive to mixed reviews from music critics. With no song released in support either on promotional single, Good News in Hard Times charted on the U.S. Billboard Top 40 Gospel Albums at number twenty-nine.

== Critical reception ==
Professional ratings
Review scores
Source	Rating
AllMusic	3/5 stars
Entertainment Weekly	A−

Good News in Hard Times received positive to mixed reviews from critics. Dimitri Ehrlich from Entertainment Weekly graded the album with A−. Describing the product as "the funky, inspiring tour de force of classic black gospel", he highlighted Phoebe Snow's performance on the roof-raising "His Eye is on the Sparrow." People acknowledged the Sisters for sticking to gospel tradition, instead blending their music with contemporary pop or R&B elements. The magazine praised the Walker's version of "He's Right on Time" for presence of "the glorious spirit of Mahalia Jackson", Peniston's sassy soul strut on "How I Got Over" and, especially, "the touching, tear-jerking way of maternal love" provided by Walden on the song "No Charge". AllMusic gave the album three (out of five) stars with no particular comment.

== Chart performance ==
On September 9, 1995, the album entered the U.S. Billboard Top Gospel Albums Chart, debuting at number thirty-four. After three weeks at the same position, plus one week at number thirty-nine, the set topped its chart run on July 10 at number twenty-nine, eventually. Overall, the album spent six weeks in the chart.

== Track listing ==
No.	Title	Writer(s)	Performer(s)	Length
1.	"Rough Side of the Mountain"	Faircloth Barnes	The Sisters of Glory	4:51
2.	"I Love the Lord"	Traditional	The Sisters of Glory and friends	0:52
3.	"Precious Lord"	Thomas A. Dorsey, George Nelson Allen	Albertina Walker	5:44
4.	"Surely God Is Able"	W. Herbert Brewster, Virginia Davis	Thelma Houston	4:49
5.	"Will the Circle Be Unbroken"	Ada R. Habershon, Charles H. Gabriel arr. Jennifer Cohen, Shelton Becton	Lois Walden	5:39
6.	"How I Got Over"	Clara Ward, arr. Jennifer Cohen, Shelton Becton	CeCe Peniston	4:36
7.	"His Eye Is on the Sparrow"	Civilla D. Martin, Charles H. Gabriel, arr. Jennifer Cohen, Shelton Becton	Phoebe Snow	6:49
8.	"He's Got the Whole World in His Hands"	Traditional, arr. Jennifer Cohen, Shelton Becton	The Sisters of Glory	3:30
9.	"I Won’t Be Back No More"	James Herndon	The Sisters of Glory	4:00
10.	"Precious Memories"	J.B.F. Wright, arr. Jennifer Cohen, Shelton Becton	CeCe Peniston	5:32
11.	"He’s Right on Time"	Dorothy Love Coates	Albertina Walker	2:58
12.	"No Charge"	Harlan Howard	Lois Walden	3:54
13.	"Move On Up a Little Higher"	W. Herbert Brewster	Phoebe Snow	4:23
14.	"Walk Around Heaven All Day"	James Cleveland, Cassietta George	Thelma Houston	4:25
15.	"Oh Happy Day"	Edwin Hawkins	The Sisters of Glory	5:48
16.	"Yes"	Traditional	The Sisters of Glory	0:26
Total length:				68:16

== Charts ==
Chart (1992)	Peak position
US Top Gospel Albums (Billboard)	29
