= Jan Rubini =

Swedish violinist and conductor (1897–1989)

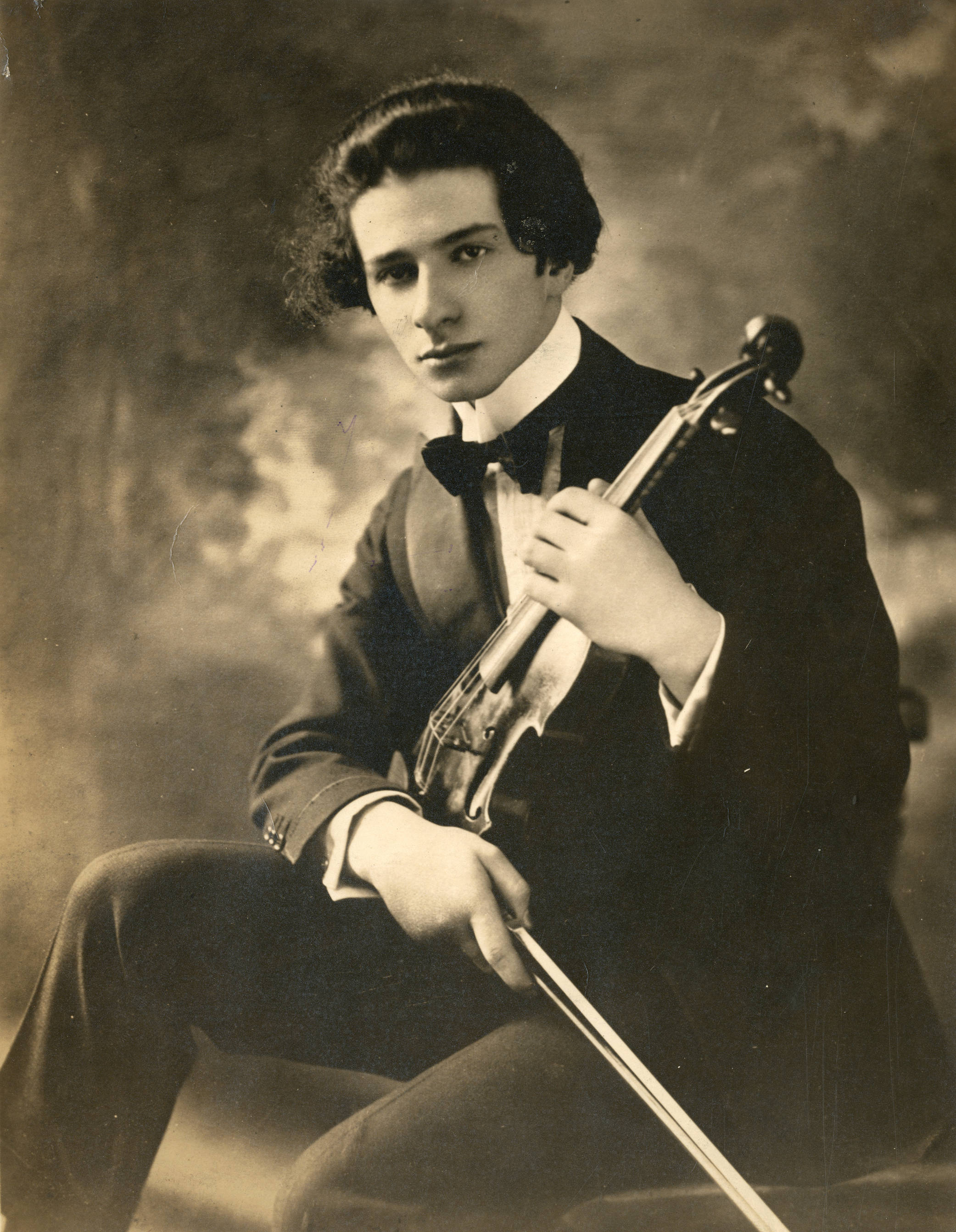

Background information
- Born: April 5, 1897; Stockholm, Sweden
- Died: December 2, 1989 (aged 92); Newport Beach, California, U.S.
- Genres: Classical
- Instrument: Violin
- Spouse(s): Diane D'Aubry (div. 1928) Adele Crane (m. 1929; div. 1939) Alice Dahl (m. 1940; div. 1955) Helen Ring Pabst (m. 1965)

Jan Rubini (April 5, 1897 – December 2, 1989) was a Swedish violinist and conductor who had a long career in vaudeville and films. His personal life was stormy, with four marriages, three of those ending in bitter divorces. He is the father of Michel, a professional musician.

== Early life ==
Rubini was born in Stockholm, Sweden, to Samuel Rubini, an Italian-British composer and pianist, and a Russian-born Swedish mother. He gave his first public violin concert at the age of 7 and performed solo for the British royal family two years later, followed by a performance for U.S. President Woodrow Wilson at age 16. During his childhood, he spent some time in Spain, where he met Salvatore Santaella; the two became great friends and would meet up again in the U.S. and perform together for many years.

== Career ==
A musical prodigy, Rubini came to the U.S. in February 1916, settling in New York City. By that time, he had already made a name for himself in the UK with concerts at the Royal Albert Hall and the Queen's Hall in London, and had conducted orchestras across Europe.

He moved to Hollywood and was hired by William Fox to play with the in-house orchestra before films were shown. such as at the Carthay Circle Theatre. The Danish musician–comedian Victor Borge recommended to Rubini that he follow in his footsteps, and Rubini became known as an entertainer in addition to a serious musician. He was known for combining comedy and musical virtuosity in his shows.

In September 1956, Rubini opened the Keyboard Supper Club in Beverly Hills, where he hosted numerous performances until he sold it in March 1958.

== Personal life ==
Rubini was married four times. He had two children with his first wife, vaudeville actress Diane D'Aubry: a daughter also named Diane and a son named Jan Rubini Jr. (also known as Bobby). They divorced in 1928. His second wife was Australian actress Adele Crane, whom he married in 1929. This marriage lasted until 1939 and also ended in divorce. The third marriage was to singer and actress Alice Dahl (also known as Terry Walker), with whom he had two sons: Michel, a professional musician, and David, and a daughter Tonia, who had a career as a singer. They divorced in 1955.

All of Rubini's divorces were acrimonious. Diane sued him to force him to resume child support payments, which he had stopped paying, claiming a lack of income due to unemployment. Bobby and his aunt, Irene Fifi D'Aubry, were subsequently arrested for battery when they went to Rubini's house to demand support payments.

Meanwhile, Adele filed a $50,000 lawsuit against Dahl for alienation of affections before their divorce was finalized. Dahl countersued for $150,000, but both lawsuits were dismissed.

Lastly, Dahl's divorce request was granted on the grounds of cruelty. She claimed that Rubini was prone to extreme jealousy and would want to know her whereabouts at all times.

His fourth marriage was to Helen Ring Pabst in 1965. They remained together until his death in 1989 in Newport Beach, California.

Rubini became an American citizen on July 26, 1940.
