= Game Show Models =

1977 film directed by David N. Gottlieb

- Directed by: David N. Gottlieb
- Written by: David N. Gottlieb
- Produced by: David N. Gottlieb
- Starring: John Vickery; Nick Pellegrino; Gilbert DeRush
- Release date: 1977
- Running time: 89 minutes
- Country: United States
- Language: English

Game Show Models is a 1977 comedy-drama film directed by David N. Gottlieb. Set in Los Angeles, it is about a man who tries to make it in mainstream society by getting a job in a public relations firm.

== Plot ==
Stuart Guber (John Vickery) is a writer who leaves his dancer girlfriend and cuts his hair to try to make it in the mainstream society of Hollywood. Stuart gets a job as a trainee in the office of a PR firm. He also enters into a relationship with one of the company's clients while working there. However, Stuart witnesses the negative side of mainstream society, which includes a sex-themed game show called Guessword created by a company executive. And eventually, he starts to realize that having a respectable job is not as fulfilling as he thought it would be.

== Cast ==
- John Vickery as Stuart Guber
- Nick Pellegrino as Arnold Goldner
- Gilbert DeRush as Roger Feinstein
- Diane Sommerfield as Cici Sheridan
- Diane Thomas as Josie
- Sid Melton as Marvin Schmitt
- Rae Sperling as Chick
- Thelma Houston as Dana Sheridan
- Cal Gibson as Bobby Jackson
- Dick Miller as Game Show Host
