= Woodstock '89 =

1989 music festival

- Genre: Rock; Hip Hop; folk; grunge; alternative rock; metal; blues rock; folk rock; jazz fusion; hard rock; world music; latin rock; punk rock
- Dates: August 12–14, 1989
- Website: The Woodstock Festivals

Woodstock '89 or "The Forgotten Woodstock" was a rock concert that took place in August 1989 on the site of the original Woodstock concert of 1969 as a spontaneous celebration of the event's 20th anniversary.

The event began with a single folk guitarist, Rich Pell, who came to the site. Pell was given permission to organize the show by Charles and June Gelish, who owned the property after buying it from Max Yasgur in 1973. With the help of Will Hoppey, Pell organized all aspects of the concert from ordering water trucks to working out who would perform on the stage. Rich also emceed the festival.

The whole event was spontaneous. Anyone was invited to perform regardless of skill levels, and the majority of performers were lesser-known bands. Wavy Gravy, the Woodstock All-Stars, and Al Hendrix, the father of Jimi Hendrix, appeared at the concert. Wayne Thiel played a small set of Hendrix material shortly before Al Hendrix came onto the stage. The band was called "Head First".

The gathering took place on the same days in August as the original festival, even though in 1989 this fell in the middle of the week.

A total lunar eclipse occurred during the concert on the night of August 16–17. Musicians worked the lunar eclipse into performances; one sang his own version of Man's "Call Down the Moon". The actual performer "calling down the moon" was Jack Hardy in his song "The Hunter".

Although the property owners briefly attempted to charge $5 for parking, and a few people had made up simple T-shirts and simple food to sell at the event, there was virtually none of the commercialism that later marked the Woodstock '94 and Woodstock '99 concerts.

The event had not been promoted other than by word of mouth, and at first it appeared there would be no stage, no lighting, and few performers until volunteers began bringing them in. Food and beverages were not sold; participants brought their own supplies and bartered with each other.

By the weekend the stage and sound system had grown to accommodate the large crowd. Members of the band Ice Nine (John Gaechter & Vince Lisanti) supplied their PA system and organized people to help build a larger stage. Performers included Melanie Safka and Savoy Brown, as well as many local artists including Will Hoppey, Ice Nine, Rich Pell, The Psychedelic Kitchen, Target, Billy Mitchell, and Jack Hardy. The concert was recorded by Barry Benson and was available as 20th Anniversary Festival: A Musical Documentary of Woodstock '89. "An estimated 150,000 people passed by, or stopped to participate in the celebration of the 1969 concert," as reported by the Sullivan County Democrat on August 22, 1989.

Because participants were allowed to park vehicles next to their tents all across the site except in the main performance area, much of the field that was so densely covered by people in 1969 was filled again by this event, but this time by cars, psychedelic buses and upscale RV's as well.

Santana declined to play Woodstock '89 but would resume at Woodstock '94.

ABC's morning program Good Morning America broadcast live from Max Yasgur's Farm, interviewing Wavy Gravy and Ken Kesey.

Later in 1997, Charles and June Gelish sold the site of the concert to Alan Gerry, who bought it and 1,400 acres (570 ha) surrounding it for the purpose of creating the Bethel Woods Center for the Arts.

== See also ==
- Woodstock Festival (1969)
- Woodstock '79 (1979)
- Woodstock '94 (1994)
- Woodstock '99 (1999)
- Woodstock '09 (2009)
