= Sisters of Glory =

1994–95 US gospel band

The Sisters of Glory
- Origin: United States
- Genres: Gospel music
- Years active: 1994–95
- Labels: Warner Bros
- Past members: Thelma Houston; CeCe Peniston; Phoebe Snow; Lois Walden; Albertina Walker

The Sisters of Glory was a US gospel band that included Thelma Houston, CeCe Peniston, Phoebe Snow, Lois Walden and Albertina Walker. After performing for the Pope John Paul II in Rome at the Vatican, the quintet released their only album entitled Good News in Hard Times, which scored at number twenty-nine on the U.S. Billboard Top Gospel Albums chart in 1995.

== About ==
The ad hoc group was put together by cabaret singer Lois Walden, who came with the name and concept, due to performing in a program entitled "Gospel Music: From the Church to the Charts", as part of thirteen-week series to benefit charity that started on April 25, 1994. That was supposed to be the end of their female group, but traveling wilburys-style proved popular to disband, so when Michael Lang (one of creators of the music festival) invited the Sisters to open Sunday morning of the Woodstock '94 they reunited for a three-day event, which later attracted an estimated 350,000 music lovers. Among forty performers, the quintet stood on the North Stage on August 14, along with Sheryl Crow, Salt-N-Pepa as only female performers at then 25th anniversary of the fest. After a call from John Paul II’s people, the Sisters would give another papal performance on December 16 for the Pope‘s concert "Christmas at the Vatican II" in Rome, and signed a record deal.

== Discography ==
=== Albums ===
Year	Title	US Gospel
1995	Good News in Hard Times: Release date: 22 August 1995; Record label: Warner Bros; Format: CD	29
