= Never Gonna Be Another One =

Studio album by Thelma Houston
- Released: August 15, 1981
- Recorded: 1980–81
- Studio: Studio Sound Recorders, North Hollywood, California
- Genre: Urban, R&B, dance-pop
- Label: RCA
- Producer: George Tobin

Thelma Houston chronology
Breakwater Cat (1980)	Never Gonna Be Another One (1981)	Reachin' All Around (1982)

Never Gonna Be Another One is Thelma Houston's eleventh studio album, released in 1981. While the album did not make an impact on the pop charts, the album performed better in the urban and club/dance music markets. It includes the two major Hot Dance/Club Play chart hits, "If You Feel It" (#6) and "96 Tears" (#22) and "Never Give You Up" (#17). All three singles gained moderate radio play.

== Track listing ==
All tracks composed by Gary Goetzman and Mike Piccirillo; except where indicated

1. "Never Give You Up"
2. "Too Many Teardrops"
3. "96 Tears" (Rudy Martinez)
4. "There's No Runnin' Away From"
5. "Never Gonna Be Another One"
6. "If You Feel It" (John William Scroggins, Ronald Brown)
7. "Don't Make Me Over" (Burt Bacharach, Hal David)
8. "Hollywood"

== Personnel ==
- Thelma Houston - lead vocals, backing vocals
- Mike Piccirillo - guitar, synthesizer, percussion, backing vocals, associate producer
- Keni Burke, Scott Edwards - bass guitar
- Bill Cuomo - keyboards, synthesizer
- Stewart Levine - keyboards
- Ed Greene - drums
- Gary Goetzman, Mark Wolfson - percussion
- Joel Peskin - saxophone
- Julia Tillman Waters, Maxine Willard Waters - backing vocals
