= Sid Melton =

American actor (1917–2011)

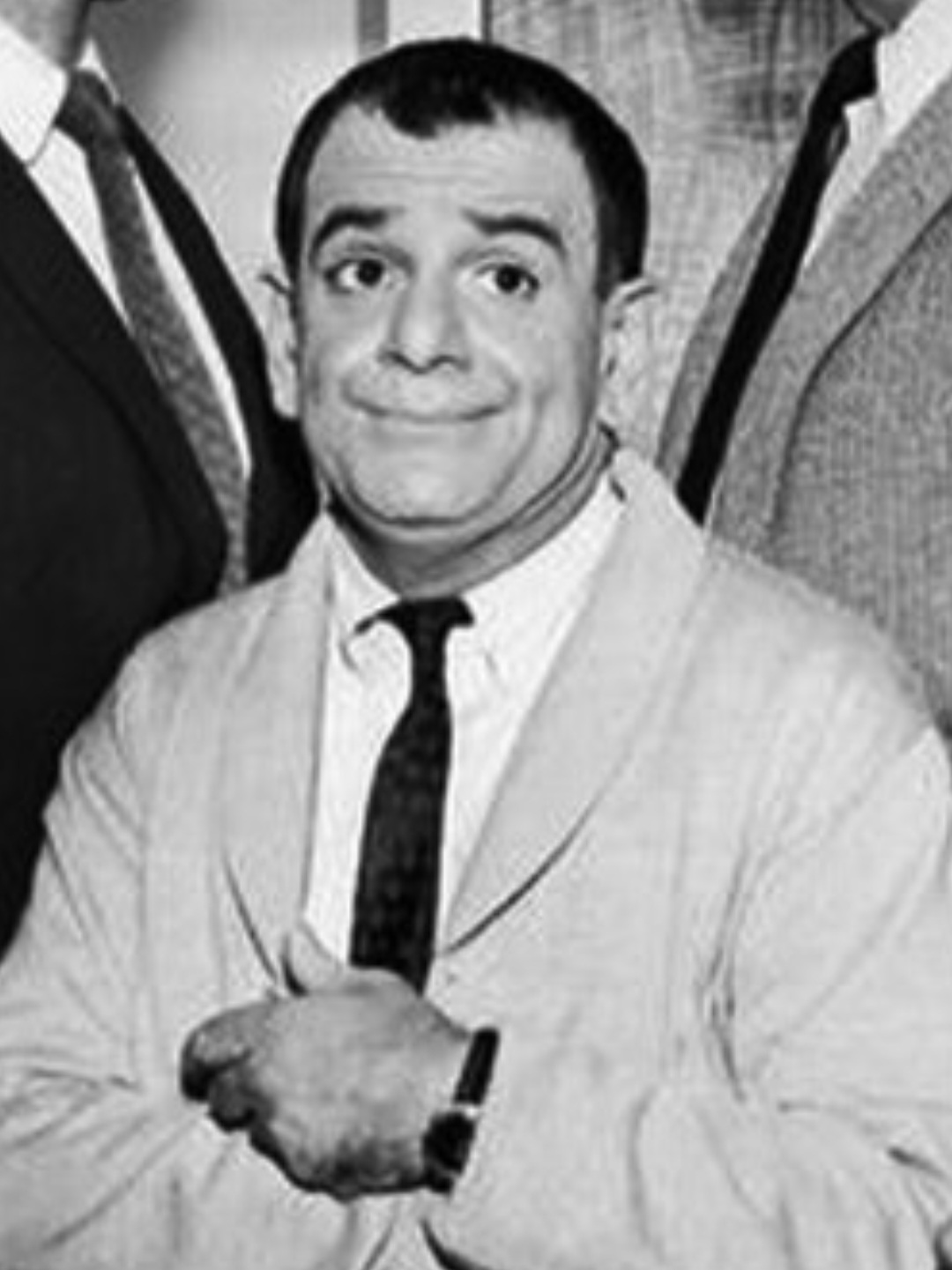
- Melton as Charlie Halper in The Danny Thomas Show (1963)
- Born: Sidney Meltzer; May 22, 1917; New York City, U.S.
- Died: November 2, 2011 (aged 94); Burbank, California, U.S.
- Occupation: Actor
- Years active: 1939–2001

Sidney Meltzer (May 22, 1917 – November 2, 2011), known professionally as Sid Melton, was an American actor. He played the roles of incompetent carpenter Alf Monroe in the CBS sitcom Green Acres, Ichabod 'Ikky' Mudd as sidekick to Captain Midnight (aka Jett Jackson The Flying Commando in syndication) and Uncle Charlie Halper, proprietor of the Copa Club, in The Danny Thomas Show and its spin-offs. He appeared in about 140 film and television projects in a career that spanned nearly 60 years. Among his most famous films were Lost Continent with Cesar Romero, The Steel Helmet with Gene Evans and Robert Hutton, The Lemon Drop Kid with Bob Hope, and Lady Sings The Blues with Diana Ross and Billy Dee Williams. He was a regular on The Danny Thomas Show and Green Acres, and appeared in flashback on several episodes of The Golden Girls as Salvadore Petrillo, the long-dead husband of Sophia Petrillo (played by Estelle Getty) and father of Dorothy Zbornak (played by Bea Arthur).

== Early life and family ==
Sidney Meltzer was born in Brooklyn, New York City, New York. His father was Isidor Meltzer, a Yiddish theater comedian. His brother Lewis Meltzer became a screenwriter. Sid was known for his short stature, 5 ft 3 in (1.60 m).

== Career ==
Sid Melton made his stage debut in a 1939 touring production of See My Lawyer. Sid's brother Lewis was a screenplay writer in Hollywood and had connections "in the industry," which led to Sid being cast as Fingers in Shadow of the Thin Man. During World War II, Melton entertained American soldiers overseas. Sid met screenwriter Aubrey Wisberg, who arranged for him to have a part in his Treasure of Monte Cristo for Robert Lippert. This was his first film after signing his first Hollywood contract with Lippert Pictures in 1949. The studio churned out low-budget films, most of them made in less than a week, and Melton was the comic relief in dozens of them, including Mask of the Dragon and Lost Continent.

Other movies included On the Town, The Geisha Boy, The Tunnel of Love, and Blondie Goes to College. He appeared in three Lippert Pictures, Hi-Jacked, Lost Continent and Radar Secret Service, the latter two being featured on Mystery Science Theater 3000, whose hosts referred to Melton as "Little Monkey Boy". He directed the exploitation movie Bad Girls Do Cry.

Melton appeared three times as Harry Cooper in the 1955–56 sitcom It's Always Jan. In the late 1950s, he played several small roles in the popular Desilu show The Lucy-Desi Comedy Hour as a construction worker who comes into the room through the window to ask for Milton Berle's autograph for his children. He starred in another episode in which he plays a bellboy for a hotel in Nome, Alaska that Lucy and the gang are staying at. He played Captain Midnight's sidekick, Ichabod "Icky" Mudd ("That's Mudd, with two D's"), in Captain Midnight, an early 1950s Saturday morning children's show. Until the end of his life, old fans would greet him on the street with his signature introductory gag line, "Mudd with two D's." He appeared in over 30 episodes of Green Acres, as Alf Monroe, one half of the brother-sister pair of handymen Alf & Ralph. Other television credits include Dragnet, The Silent Service, and M Squad. Sid appeared in S6 E9 of The Andy Griffith Show (The Hollywood Party) as a publicity agent for Ruta Lee’s character Darlene Mason. He appeared in four episodes of the final two seasons of Gomer Pyle, U.S.M.C. as Friendly Freddy, an unsuccessful con-artist who bilks Gomer and Sgt. Carter, among others, but always gets caught, sometimes several times in the same episode. He had guest roles on Adventures of Superman, I Dream of Jeannie and The Dick Van Dyke Show; in the last he played deli owner Bert Monker, who is in love with Sally Rogers (played by Rose Marie). In 1956 Melton appeared in an uncredited role as Shorty on the TV western Cheyenne in the episode "The Last Train West."

Melton appeared in a humorous 1966 television commercial as a truck driver carrying new American Motors automobiles.

In 2025, Melton was name-checked in the book A Fine Line Between Stupid and Clever about the making of the 1984 film This is Spinal Tap and its sequel. Michael McKean, who plays Spinal Tap's lead singer, describes their process for developing the sequel: "Basically what we'd do is get together for 3 hours and talk about Jimmy Durante or 'boy wasn't that Sid Melton something...'"

== Personal life and death ==
Melton was married in the 1940s, but the marriage was annulled. Melton died from pneumonia on November 2, 2011, aged 94, at Providence St. Joseph Medical Center in Burbank, California.

== Selected filmography ==
- Blondie Goes to College (1942) as 'Mouse' Gifford (uncredited)
- Close-Up (1948) as Stanislaus Kranobowsky, Cabbie
- Lady at Midnight (1948) as Benny Muscle (uncredited)
- Knock on Any Door (1949) as "Squint" Zinsky (uncredited)
- Tough Assignment (1949) as Herman
- Radar Secret Service (1950) as Pill Box
- Lost Continent (1951) as Sergeant Willie Tatlow
- The Steel Helmet (1951) as Joe
- Leave it to the Marines (1951) as Private Meek
- Mask of the Dragon (1951) as Manchu Murphy
- Savage Drums (1951) as Jimmy Cuso
- Under Fire (1957) - GI #1 (uncredited)
- The Joker Is Wild (1957) - Racetrack Runner (uncredited)
- Alfred Hitchcock Presents (1958) (Season 4 Episode 7: "Man with a Problem") - Cab Driver
- Thundering Jets (1958) - Sergeant Eddie Stone
- The Tunnel of Love (1958) - Truck Driver (uncredited)
- The Buccaneer (1958) - Kentuckian (uncredited)
- The Geisha Boy (1958) - Taxi Driver (uncredited)
- Lone Texan (1959) - Gus Pringle - the barber
- Alias Jesse James (1959) - New York Bar Fight Fan (uncredited)
- The Beat Generation (1959) - Police Detective Carlotti (uncredited)
- The Atomic Submarine (1959) - Yeoman Chester Tuttle
- The Rise and Fall of Legs Diamond (1960) - Little Augie (uncredited)
- Why Must I Die? (1960) - Morrie Waltzer
- The Munsters (1964) - Diamond Jim
- It Takes All Kinds (1969) - Benjie
- Lady Sings the Blues (1972) - Jerry
- Hit! (1973) - Herman
- Sheila Levine Is Dead and Living in New York (1975) - Manny
- The Lady from Peking (1975) - Benny Segal
- Sixpack Annie (1975) - Angelo
- Game Show Models (1977) - Marvin Schmitt
- ...And Call Me in the Morning (1999) - Eddie
