= Ready to Roll (Thelma Houston album) =

Studio album by Thelma Houston
- Released: October 20, 1978
- Recorded: 1978
- Genre: R&B
- Label: Tamla
- Producer: Hal Davis; Greg Wright; Bobby Belle

Thelma Houston chronology
Two to One (1978)	Ready to Roll (1978)	Ride to the Rainbow (1979)

Ready to Roll is the eighth album by Thelma Houston, released in 1978 on Motown Records. It was a modest success, peaking only at #74 in the US R&B charts. The single "Saturday Night, Sunday Morning" gained momentum in 1979 and was included in a remixed version on Houston's Ride to the Rainbow album in 1979. The album was released on CD in 2018 by Soulmusic Records, in a compilation that also includes The Devil in Me, Ride to the Rainbow and Reachin' All Around.

== Track listing ==
1. "Saturday Night, Sunday Morning" (Mitchell Botler, Norma Helms)
2. "Love Is Comin' On" (Greg Wright, Karin Patterson, Ronnie Vann)
3. "I Wanna Start My Life All Over Again" (Sandra Crouch, Sharon Anton)
4. "Midnight Mona" (Greg Wright, Kain Patterson, Ronnie Vann)
5. "Pardon Me" (Alfred McCrary, Sundray Tucker)
6. "Everybody's Got a Story" (Sandra Crouch, Sharon Anton)
7. "Strange" (Greg Wright, Karin Patterson, Olivia Foster)
8. "Am I Expecting Too Much" (Curtis Anthony Nolen, Dana Meyers, Maureen Bailey, Raymond Crossley)
9. "Can't We Try" (Ken Hirsch, Ronald Miller)

== Personnel ==
- Thelma Houston – lead vocals
- Rock Deadrick – percussion
- James Gadson – drums
- Greg Wright – keyboards, backing vocals
- Ray Parker Jr. – guitar
- Greg Phillinganes – keyboards
- Eddie N. Watkins Jr. – bass guitar
- Gary Coleman – percussion
- Sonny Burke – keyboards
- Roland Bautista – guitar
- Robert Lee Hill – bass guitar
- Gene Estes – vibraphone
- Alan Estes – percussion
- Alan Oldfield – keyboards
- Wah Wah Watson – guitar
- Eddie "Bongo" Brown – percussion
- John Barnes – keyboards
- Tony Newton – bass guitar
- Ronnie Vann – guitar
- Clarence McDonald – keyboards
- Ivory Davis – backing vocals
- Maxi Anderson – backing vocals
- Julia Tillman Waters – backing vocals
- Maxine Waters – backing vocals
- Oren Waters – backing vocals
- Roger St. Kenerly – backing vocals
- Pattie Brooks – backing vocals
- Platypus – backing vocals
- Olivia Foster – backing vocals
- Karin Patterson – backing vocals
- Stephanie Spruill – backing vocals
- Venetta Fields – backing vocals
- Dorothy Sheffield – backing vocals
- Arthur G. Wright, David Blumberg, Jimmie Haskell – string and horn arrangements
