= I've Got the Music in Me (album) =

Studio album by Thelma Houston
- Released: 1975
- Recorded: February 24–26, 1975
- Studio: Sheffield Lab Studios, Hollywood, California
- Genre: Rhythm and blues, disco, funk
- Length: 28:59
- Label: Sheffield Lab
- Producer: Bill Schnee

Thelma Houston chronology
Thelma Houston (1972)	I've Got the Music in Me (1975)	Any Way You Like It (1976)

I've Got the Music in Me is the third studio album by American singer Thelma Houston featuring session band Pressure Cooker.

It was recorded live to master disc and was released by Sheffield Lab in 1975, Cat# Lab-2. Featuring the vocals of Thelma Houston and session players including Larry Knechtel, Lincoln Mayorga, Larry Carlton, Jim Gordon, Tom Scott, Michael Omartian and others.

In April 2025 the album was inducted into the National Recording Registry.

== Track listings ==
1. "I've Got the Music in Me" – (Bias Boshell) – 2:44
2. "Reggae Tune" (Instrumental) (Andy Fairweather Low) – 3:21
3. "To Know You Is to Love You" (Stevie Wonder, Syreeta Wright) – 3:57
4. "Pressure Cooker" (Instrumental) (Mike Melvoin, Bill Schnee) – 4:24
5. "Don't Misunderstand" (Gordon Parks) – 3:21
6. "Step in Time" (Instrumental) (Michael Omartian, Mark Tulin) – 3:22
7. "Dish Rag (Instrumental) (Michael Omartian) – 3:35
8. "Got to Get You into My Life"/"I've Got the Music In Me" (Reprise) (John Lennon, Paul McCartney / Bias Boshell) – 4:15

== Personnel ==
- Thelma Houston – vocals
- Larry Knechtel, Lincoln Mayorga, Mike Melvoin, Michael Omartian – keyboards
- Larry Carlton, Dean Parks – guitar
- Reinie Press – bass guitar
- Jim Gordon, Jim Keltner – drums
- Gary Coleman, Victor Feldman – percussion
- Chuck Findley, Paul Hubinon – trumpet
- Dick Hyde, Lew McCreary – trombone
- Jim Horn, Tom Scott – saxophone
- Richard Perissi – French horn
- Morgan Ames, Jim Gilstrap, Myrna Matthews, Marti McCall, Lisa Roberts, Jackie Ward – background vocals
- Mike Melvoin, Michael Omartian – arranger
- Lincoln Mayorga – conductor

Technical

- Doug Sax, Lincoln Mayorga – executive producer
- Bill Schnee – recording engineer
- Christina Farley – album design & photography
- Pat Nagel – cover illustration
