= Woodstock '94 =

1994 music festival in New York, United States

- Woodstock '94 poster design
- Genre: Rock; hip-hop; folk; grunge; alternative rock; metal; blues rock; folk rock; jazz fusion; hard rock; world music; latin rock; punk rock
- Dates: August 12–14, 1994
- Locations: Saugerties, New York, U.S.
- Coordinates: 42.09°N 73.985°W
- Founders: Michael Lang, John P. Roberts, Joel Rosenman, (Woodstock ventures)
- Attendance: approximately 350,000 (164,000 paid)
- Website: The Woodstock Festivals

Location in the United States
Location in New York

Woodstock '94 was an American music festival held in 1994 to commemorate the 25th anniversary of the original Woodstock festival of 1969. It was promoted as "2 More Days of Peace and Music". The poster used to promote the first concert was revised to feature two catbirds perched on the neck of a Fender electric guitar, instead of the original one catbird on an acoustic guitar.

The 1994 concert was scheduled for the weekend of August 13–14, with a third day (Friday, August 12) added later. Tickets to the festival cost $135 each. The weather was hot and dry on Friday but by early Saturday afternoon storms rolled in. The rains turned much of the field into mud.

The event took place on Winston Farm, just west of Saugerties, New York-about 100 miles (160 km) north of New York City and 70 miles (110 km) northeast of the original 1969 festival site near Bethel.

Elsewhere, 12,000 people who had attended the original Woodstock festival celebrated its silver anniversary at the 1969 site.

Though only 164,000 tickets were sold, the crowd at Woodstock '94 was estimated at 350,000. The size of the crowd was larger than concert organizers had planned for and by the second night many of the event policies were logistically unenforceable. The major issues related to security, when attendees arrived, left or returned to the site, and the official concert food and beverage vendor policy which initially restricted attendees from entering with supplies of food, drinks, and above all alcohol. With the concert site mostly enclosed by simple chain link fences, there was hardly any difficulty for many attendees to enter freely with beer and other banned items. The security staff, along with the entrance and exit staff, could not continue reasonable monitoring of the increasing number of people entering and exiting while at the same time maintaining safety, security, and a peaceful atmosphere.

Three deaths at the festival were confirmed. An unidentified 45-year-old male died on Saturday of suspected diabetes complications. On Sunday, a 20-year-old died of a ruptured spleen. Organizers also confirmed 5,000 were treated at medical tents and 800 were taken to hospitals.

Nearly 24 million households bought pay-per-view for the festival, making it the highest-grossing pay-per-view musical event ever at the time.

The festival was followed by Woodstock '99, also in New York at Rome.

== Performers and notable events during the festival ==
=== Friday, August 12 ===
==== North Stage ====
- Roguish Armament with Rekk
- Master of None
- 3
- Futu Futu
- Abba Rage
- Lunchmeat
- The Paul Luke Band
- Peacebomb
- The Goats
- Huffamoose
- Orleans
- Blues Traveler
- Jackyl
- Del Amitri
- Live
- James
- King's X
- Sheryl Crow
- Collective Soul
- Candlebox
- Violent Femmes

==== Ravestock ====
- Aphex Twin
- Deee-Lite
- DJ Spooky
- Doc Martin
- Frankie Bones
- Kevin Saunderson
- Little Louie Vega
- The Orb
- Orbital
- Soul Slinger
- DJ Scotto

=== Notable Events: Day 1 ===
- Jackyl took the stage early on Friday. Lead singer Jesse James Dupree took the stage with a bottle of whiskey and poured alcohol onto the crowd. He then started smoking marijuana and on a close up he shotgunned the joint into the camera, with copious amounts of smoke filling the screens and the stage, at which point the crowd cheered. Dupree then lit a stool on fire onstage and cut it up with a chainsaw. He also pulled out a rifle and started firing into the air but cut his hand, which started bleeding. As Dupree wiped his forehead, a streak of blood was left across his head.
- Aphex Twin's performance was cut short when promoters "disconnected" him mid-show for signing a fake name on a contract, which would forfeit PolyGram's rights to his performance.

=== Saturday, August 13 ===
==== North Stage ====
- Joe Cocker
- Blind Melon
- Cypress Hill
- Rollins Band
- Melissa Etheridge
- Crosby, Stills, & Nash
- Nine Inch Nails
- Metallica
- Aerosmith

==== South Stage ====
- Nenad Bach
- The Cranberries
- Zucchero
- Youssou N'Dour
- The Band featuring Hot Tuna, Bruce Hornsby, Roger McGuinn, Rob Wasserman, and Bob Weir
- Primus featuring Jerry Cantrell
- Salt-N-Pepa
- Vinx

=== Notable Events: Day 2 ===
- Blind Melon frontman Shannon Hoon took the stage in his girlfriend's dress and appeared to be tripping on acid during the band's performance and post-show interview with MTV.
- Nine Inch Nails had the largest crowd density at the event, overshadowing many of the other performers. Just before going on stage, they wrestled each other in the mud and went on to perform completely wet and covered in mud. In the post-performance interview, Nine Inch Nails frontman Trent Reznor claimed he thought his band's performance was "terrible" due to technical difficulties on stage. Reznor admitted that while he disliked playing at such a large show, it was done for the money: "To be quite frank, it's basically to offset the cost of the tour we're doing right now." Their performance of "Happiness in Slavery" at the festival won the Grammy Award for Best Metal Performance in 1996.
- Aerosmith's Joey Kramer, Joe Perry, and Steven Tyler were all attendees at the original Woodstock festival in 1969. Aerosmith performed around 3 to 4 a.m., right after an extensive fireworks display from Metallica. Tyler said on the liner notes for the album during their set: "It rained like a cow pissing on a flat rock".
- During Primus's performance of the song "My Name Is Mud", the audience responded by pelting the band with mud, which singer and bassist Les Claypool ended by telling the crowd that "when you throw things on stage, it's a sign of small and insignificant genitalia". Twenty years after the show, Claypool claimed to still have some of the mud stuck in the bass cabinets he used at the event. Another memorable moment from Primus' set at Woodstock '94 was when Jerry Cantrell, the guitarist and vocalist of Alice in Chains, joined Primus onstage during their performance of the song "Harold of the Rocks".

=== Sunday, August 14 ===
==== North Stage ====
- Country Joe McDonald
- Sisters of Glory featuring Thelma Houston, CeCe Peniston, Phoebe Snow, Mavis Staples, and Lois Walden
- Arrested Development
- The Allman Brothers Band
- Traffic
- Spin Doctors
- Porno for Pyros
- Bob Dylan
- Red Hot Chili Peppers
- Peter Gabriel

==== South Stage ====
- John Sebastian and the J-Band
- Country Joe McDonald
- Gil Scott-Heron
- WOMAD
  - Samite
  - Xalam
  - The Justin Vali Trio
  - Geoffrey Oryema
  - Hassan Hakmoun & Zahar
- Green Day
- Paul Rodgers Rock and Blues Revue featuring Slash, Neal Schon, Andy Fraser, and Jason Bonham
- The Neville Brothers
- Santana featuring Eric Gales
- Jimmy Cliff's All Star Reggae Jam featuring Rita Marley, Eek-A-Mouse and Shabba Ranks

=== Notable Events: Day 3 ===
- Woodstock '94 has also been referred to as Mudstock or Mudstock '94, partly due to the rainy weather that resulted in mud pits and the aforementioned performances of Nine Inch Nails and Primus. This culminated with Green Day's performance, during which guitarist and lead vocalist Billie Joe Armstrong started a mudfight with the crowd during their song "Paper Lanterns". In the documentary VH1 Behind the Music: Green Day, bassist Mike Dirnt was mistaken for one of the fans jumping on stage and was spear-tackled by a security guard, knocking out one of his teeth. It was this incident that caused Dirnt to need emergency orthodontia. A gag order was put in place regarding this incident. Due to the now-infamous mudfight and Dirnt's injury, Woodstock quickly propelled Green Day's then recently released album Dookie into success.
- After being injured in a traffic accident in 1966 and his subsequent disappearance from the popular music scene, Bob Dylan declined to go to the original Woodstock Festival of 1969, even though he lived in the area at the time. He set off for the Isle of Wight Festival the day the Woodstock festival started and performed at Woodside Bay on August 31, 1969. Dylan, however, did accept an invitation to perform at Woodstock '94 and was introduced with the phrase: "We waited twenty-five years to hear this. Ladies and gentlemen, Mr. Bob Dylan". Although he was an hour and a half late to his performance, his set was considered one of the greater moments of the festival by various critics and represented the beginning of another new phase in his lengthy career. Uncharacteristically for the time, Dylan played lead guitar in a more rock-oriented electric set.
- The Red Hot Chili Peppers performed in lightbulb costumes for the first song of their set. Later in the set they would all dress up as Jimi Hendrix had at the original Woodstock. The lightbulb costumes are now on display at the Hard Rock Hotel & Casino in Las Vegas, Nevada.
- Peter Gabriel headlined the North Stage on the last night and closed Woodstock '94.

=== Other notes on performers ===
- Several of the artists including Green Day and Cypress Hill skipped at least one Lollapalooza tour date in order to appear at Woodstock '94.
- Performers from the original Woodstock appearing at Woodstock '94 were the Band, Santana, Joe Cocker, Country Joe McDonald, John Sebastian, the surviving members of Sweetwater, and Crosby, Stills, & Nash. Additionally, Jorma Kaukonen and Jack Casady of Jefferson Airplane/Hot Tuna and Bob Weir of the Grateful Dead, all Woodstock alumni, also appeared, performing with the Band on guitar, bass, and guitar and vocals, respectively.
- Six local unsigned bands performed at Woodstock '94, including Futu Futu and Lunch Meat of Saugerties, and Straight Wired of Westchester County.

=== Declined invitations or missed connections ===
- Guns N' Roses were asked to appear at the festival but the band declined due to internal problems, as well as feeling the concert was too "commercial." However, lead guitarist Slash made an appearance with Paul Rodgers.
- Johnny Cash (the only living person at that time to be inducted into both the Country Music Hall of Fame and the Rock and Roll Hall of Fame) was also invited to perform on the last day of Woodstock '94, but declined after learning that he would not be performing on the main stage.
- Alice in Chains were on the festival’s initial bill. However, the band pulled out due to lead singer Layne Staley's continuing drug problems. However, guitarist Jerry Cantrell made a guest appearance on Primus' set.
- Todd Rundgren had a multimedia performance in the festival's "Surreal Field" several times during the course of the entire festival.
- Soundgarden were asked to play at the festival, but the band declined the invitation. Chris Cornell said at the time: "I think we've spent enough time playing in situations like that. It isn't our show."
- Promoters initially pursued Nirvana to perform at the festival. At the time, the band pulled out of Lollapalooza due to singer Kurt Cobain's health. By the time the festival was set to take place, Cobain's death and the band's disbanding eliminated the idea.
- Mexican band Caifanes were invited, but they declined.

== Broadcast and recordings ==
The Woodstock '94 festival was shot using the early analog HD 1125-line Hi-Vision system in a 16:9 aspect ratio. The footage would be used for later home packages and a planned theatrical documentary about the event. The HD footage was mixed live into standard definition 4:3 NTSC for cable TV broadcast.

The Woodstock '94 festival was broadcast live on MTV via pay-per-view in the U.S. and Canada. In the UK, audio from the event was broadcast on BBC Radio 1.

=== Commercial releases ===
Highlights from the concert were later released as a double album set on November 4, 1994 on CD and cassette. The film about the event, directed by Bruce Gowers, was also released direct-to-video the same year on VHS and Laserdisc. Currently, there is no DVD, Blu-ray, or digital media release.

Since the release of the official album, various recordings of songs performed have been released officially; however, complete performances of entire sets have only been released unofficially as bootlegs. In 2019, a limited edition vinyl-only release of Green Day's performance was released for Record Store Day, making this one of the first official releases of an entire Woodstock '94 set.

==== Video and discography ====
- Woodstock '94 at IMDb – a film directed by Bruce Gowers with the highlights of performances
- Woodstock 94 – a live album released by A&M Records
- Woodstock 1994 - Green Day (587282-1) - a 2019 Record Store Day vinyl release of their set.

== See also ==
- Woodstock (1969)
- Woodstock '79 (1979)
- Woodstock '89 (1989)
- Przystanek Woodstock (1995– )
- Woodstock '99 (1999)
- Woodstock '09 (2009)
