= Lois Walden =

American singer

Lois Walden (born February 8, 1946) is an American author, singer, songwriter, actor, record producer, performer & teaching artist for The Acting Company. She is the author of two novels: One More Stop, a 2012 finalist for the Lambda Literary Award for Lesbian Debut Fiction and Waterstones New Voices finalist, and Afterworld published in 2013 in the UK and in May 2014 in the US by Arcadia Books.

Walden is also a teaching artist for The Acting Company in New York, and devotes part of each year working in inner city schools, and other artistically deprived populations, educating teachers, students and audiences about process drama & creativity.

In 1994, Walden co-created, directed, co-wrote, and hosted the inaugural season of SongmastersInsideOut, a thirteen-week series of live performances at the Algonquin Hotel's Oak Room celebrating the great masters of songwriting and the stars who made their music famous.

As a singer, songwriter and record producer Walden has made three record albums: Walden which featured Walden as a solo performer, Traveler [Discovery Records - 77073-2] on which she performed and wrote or co-wrote many of the songs, and Good News in Hard Times on which she sang as a member of the Gospel group Sisters of Glory. The Sisters of Glory, comprising Thelma Houston, CeCe Peniston, Phoebe Snow, Walden and Albertina Walker, performed at Woodstock '94. The album, produced by Jennifer Cohen in collaboration with Walden, earned positive reviews from music critics, including Entertainment Weekly. Good News in Hard Times charted on the U.S. Billboard Top 40 Gospel Albums at number 29.

Lois Walden is also the co-librettist (with Jeane Claude van Itallie) on a 2018 opera, MILA: Great Sorcerer, showcasing in January 2019 as part of New York's Prototype Festival.

== Sisters of Glory ==
Sisters of Glory is an ad hoc group that was put together by Lois Walden, who came up with the name and concept after performing in a program entitled "Gospel Music: From the Church to the Charts", as part of thirteen-week series to benefit charity that started on April 25, 1994. That was supposed to be the end of their female group, but Traveling Wilburys-style proved too popular to disband, so when Michael Lang (one of creators of the music festival) invited the Sisters to open Sunday morning of the Woodstock '94 they reunited for a three-day event, which later attracted an estimated 350,000 music lovers. Among forty performers, the quintet stood on the North Stage on August 14, along with Sheryl Crow, Salt-N-Pepa as only female performers at then 25th anniversary of the fest. After a call from John Paul II's people, the Sisters would give another papal performance on December 16 for the Pope's concert "Christmas at the Vatican II" in Rome, and signed a record deal.

== Books ==
- Afterworld (Arcadia Books 2014)
- One More Stop (Arcadia Books 2010)

== Music ==
- MILA: Great Sorcerer (Opera, 2018). Co-librettist with Jean Claude van Itallie)
- Good News in Hard Times
- Walden- Walden (LP, Album), Earth Records (2)ELPS-1001
- Traveler- Discovery Records – 77073–2
- "Amanda's" - ABC/Viacom SitCom; Composer, Theme Music (1983)
- "An Innocent Love" - Lyricist & Singer. Movie of the Week (1982)
- "Take Me Down" Written by Lois Walden & Michel Colombier Track 2 / Michel Colombier (Self titled album - Chrysalis 1979)

== Film ==
- Coma (1978)
- Mean Streets (1973)

== Television ==
- Unsung (Documentary) (2013)
- Harris & Company NBC Universal (1979)
- The Dream Makers (1975)
- Queen of the Stardust Ballroom (1975)
- I Love You Goodbye (1974)
- David Frost Episode #2.55 (1969)
- Joey Bishop (1969)
