= Two to One =

Studio album by Thelma Houston and Jerry Butler
- Released: July 1978
- Recorded: 1977
- Genre: R&B
- Label: Motown
- Producer: Hal Davis; Michael B. Sutton; Van McCoy; Willie Hutch; Clayton Ivey; Terry Woodford; Sam Brown III

Thelma Houston and Jerry Butler chronology
The Devil in Me (1977)	Two to One (1978)	Ready to Roll (1978)

Two to One is an album by Thelma Houston released on Motown Records. Her seventh album, it was released in June 1978. It was her second duets album with Jerry Butler, composed of only two left-over duets from their Thelma & Jerry album from the previous year, "If It Would Never End" and "You Gave Me Love", padded out with previously unreleased solo recordings by each singer, Houston's "Find a Way", "I'm Not Strong Enough (To Love You Again)" and "Don't Pity Me", while Butler's tracks included "We Owe It to Ourselves", "Never Gonna Get Enough" and "Chicago Send Her Home".

The album failed to chart. It was released on CD in 2013 as a 2-LPs-on-1-CD package with the Thelma & Jerry album.

== Track listing ==
1. "If It Would Never End" (Michael B. Sutton, Pam Sawyer) produced by Hal Davis and Michael B. Sutton, arranged by David Blumberg
2. "Find a Way" (Charles Kipps, Van McCoy) produced and arranged by Van McCoy
3. "We Owe It to Ourselves" (Jerry Butler, Willie Hutch) produced and arranged by Willie Hutch
4. "I'm Not Strong Enough (To Love You Again)" (Frank Johnson) produced by Clayton Ivey and Terry Woodford
5. "Never Gonna Get Enough" (Sam Brown III, Leon Ware) produced by Sam Brown III
6. "Don't Pity Me" (Van McCoy) produced and arranged by Van McCoy
7. "Chicago Send Her Home" (Jesse Boyce) produced by Clayton Ivey and Terry Woodford, arranged by Clayton Ivey, Skip Lane and Terry Woodford
8. "You Gave Me Love" (Elliot Willensky) produced and arranged by Van McCoy
