= Thelma & Jerry =

Studio album by Thelma Houston
- Released: 1977
- Recorded: 1977
- Studios: Chicago Recording, Chicago, Illinois
- Genres: R&B, soul
- Label: Motown
- Producers: Hal Davis, Homer Talbert, Jerry Butler, Michael B. Sutton

Thelma Houston chronology
Any Way You Like It (1976)	Thelma & Jerry (1977)	The Devil in Me (1977)

Professional ratings
Review scores
Source	Rating
AllMusic	3/5 stars
The Rolling Stone Record Guide	2/5 stars

Thelma & Jerry is an album by the American musicians Thelma Houston and Jerry Butler, released in 1977 on Motown Records. It is the first of two vocal duet albums Houston did with Butler. It includes the R&B chart hit, "It's a Lifetime Thing".

== Track listing ==
1. "Only the Beginning" (Lawrence Hanks, Rodney Massey)
2. "And You've Got Me" (Homer Talbert, Patricia Henley)
3. "It's a Lifetime Thing" (Keithen Carter, Michael Ward)
4. "Medley:"If You Leave Me Now"/"Love So Right" (Peter Cetera/Barry Gibb, Robin Gibb, Maurice Gibb)
5. "I Love You Through Windows" (Herman Wheatley, Keithen Carter, Michael Ward)
6. "Joy Inside My Tears" (Stevie Wonder)
7. "Sweet Love I've Found" (Don Daniels, Michael B. Sutton, Brenda Sutton)
8. "(Play the Game of) Let's Pretend" (Kathy Wakefield, Michael B. Sutton, Brenda Sutton)
9. "Let's Get Together" (Zane Grey, Len Ron Hanks, Skip Scarborough)

== Personnel ==
- Thelma Houston – lead vocals
- Jerry Butler – lead vocals
- Byron Gregory – guitar
- Danny Leek – guitar
- David T. Walker – guitar
- David Shields – bass guitar
- Henry Davis – bass guitar
- Ron Harris – bass guitar
- Clarence McDonald – keyboards
- John Barnes – keyboards
- Lawrence Hanks – keyboards
- Michael B. Sutton – keyboards
- Terry Friar – keyboards
- Brian Grice – drums
- Ed Greene – drums
- James Gadson – drums
- Steve Cobb – drums
- Melvin Sparks – percussion
- Eddie "Bongo" Brown – congas
- Brenda Sutton – backing vocals
- Jesse Richardson – backing vocals
- Judy Cheeks – backing vocals
- Keithen Carter – backing vocals
- Mattie Butler – backing vocals
- Patricia Henley – backing vocals
- Sue Conway – backing vocals
- Annette Butler – additional backing vocals, handclaps (on "Only the Beginning")
- Brenda M. Boyce – additional backing vocals, handclaps (on "Only the Beginning")
- Georgia Ward – additional backing vocals, handclaps (on "Only the Beginning")
- Homer Talbert – additional backing vocals, handclaps (on "Only the Beginning")
- Naomi Henyard – additional backing vocals, handclaps (on "Only the Beginning")
- Rhonda Jenkins – additional backing vocals, handclaps (on "Only the Beginning")
- Steven Milburn – additional backing vocals, handclaps (on "Only the Beginning")
- Tom DePierro – additional backing vocals, handclaps (on "Only the Beginning")
- Arthur G. Wright – arrangements
- David Blumberg – arrangements
- Paul David Wilson – arrangements
