= Qualifying Heat =

Studio album by Thelma Houston
- Released: September 9, 1984
- Recorded: 1983–84
- Genres: Urban, contemporary R&B, dance-pop
- Length: 41:27
- Label: MCA Records
- Producers: Jimmy Jam and Terry Lewis; Clif Magness; Glen Ballard; Monte Moir

Thelma Houston chronology
Thelma Houston (1983)	Qualifying Heat (1984)	Throw You Down (1990)

Professional ratings
Review scores
Source	Rating
AllMusic	3/5 stars

Qualifying Heat is the 14th studio album by American singer Thelma Houston, released in 1984. While the album failed to cross over into the pop market, it became a success in both the urban and dance music markets, charting on the Billboard charts for six months. It includes the singles "(I Guess) It Must Be Love", "You Used to Hold Me So Tight", and "I'd Rather Spend the Bad Times with You Than the Good Times with Someone New". On August 20, 2007, the album was reissued as an import title including a bonus track, "Standing in the Light", from her 1983 album.

== Track listing ==
No.	Title	Writer(s)	Length
1.	"(I Guess) It Must Be Love"	Monte Moir	7:20
2.	"You Used to Hold Me So Tight"	Jimmy Jam; Terry Lewis	5:42
3.	"Fantasy and Heartbreak"	Moir	5:04
4.	"I'd Rather Spend the Bad Times with You Than the Good Times with Someone New"	Jimmy Jam; Terry Lewis	6:00
5.	"Shake You"	Clif Magness; Glen Ballard	4:04
6.	"Generate Love"	Dennis Lambert; Franne Golde	4:34
7.	"Love Is a Dangerous Game"	Bunny Hull; Gary Poirot	4:09
8.	"What a Woman Feels Inside"	John Lewis Parker; Marti Sharron	4:19
