= Sunshower (Thelma Houston album) =

Studio album by Thelma Houston
- Released: August 21, 1969
- Recorded: 1968–69
- Genre: Soul, pop
- Label: Dunhill
- Producer: Jimmy Webb

Thelma Houston chronology
Sunshower (1969)	Thelma Houston (1972)

Professional ratings
Review scores
Source	Rating
Allmusic	4.5/5 stars

Sunshower is the debut album of Thelma Houston, released in 1969 on Dunhill Records. It was produced by Jimmy Webb and charted at number 50 on the Billboard R&B chart.

Prior to signing at Dunhill Records, Houston had recorded three singles, in 1967 at Capitol Records, as lead vocalist of the group called The Art Reynolds Singers. None of these singles made any mark on the singles charts. This album produced four singles: "Everybody Gets to Go to the Moon", "Sunshower", "If This Was the Last Song" and "Jumpin' Jack Flash". Houston recorded several other tracks while signed to Dunhill. These were issued on an expanded CD re-issue of Sunshower in 2010 by the Soulmusic.com label.

== Track listing ==
For the 1969 album release on Dunhill Records; Dunhill DS-50054
All tracks composed and arranged by Jimmy Webb; except where indicated.

Side one

1. "Sunshower (From His Own Dark City)" – 3:17
2. "Everybody Gets to Go to the Moon" – 4:16
3. "To Make It Easier on You" – 4:42
4. "Didn't We" – 3:10
5. "(Crazy) Mixed Up Girl" – 4:15
6. "Someone Is Standing Outside" – 3:27

Side two

1. "Jumpin' Jack Flash" (Mick Jagger, Keith Richards) – 3:25
2. "This Is Where I Came In" – 3:15
3. "Pocketful of Keys" – 3:03
4. "This Is Your Life" – 3:42
5. "Cheap Lovin'" (arranged by Elton "Skip" Mosher) – 3:30
6. "If This Was the Last Song" – 3:20

CD bonus tracks on 2010 Soulmusic.com re-issue

13. "Save the Country" – 1970 A-side single release on Dunhill-ABC Records (Laura Nyro) – 2:47
14. "I Just Can't Stay Away" – 1970 B-side single release on Dunhill-ABC Records (Harvey Price, Dan Walsh) – 2:16
15. "I Just Gotta be Me" – 1970 A-side single release on Dunhill-ABC Records (Dennis Lambert, Brian Potter) – 2:23
16. "Crying in the Sunshine" – 1970 B-side single release on Dunhill-ABC Records (Moogy Klingman) – 2:51
17. "(The) Good Earth" – 1970 A-side UK single release only on EMI-Stateside Records (Karen O’Hara, Denny McReynolds) – 3:01
18. "Ride Louis, Ride (Change in Louise)" – 1970 B-side UK single release only on EMI-Stateside Records (Joe Cocker, Chris Stainton) – 2:38

== Personnel ==
- Thelma Houston – vocals
- Hal Blaine – drums, percussion
- Joe Osborn – Fender 8-string electric bass guitar, acoustic 12-string bass guitar
- Fred Tackett - acoustic and electric guitar
- Mike Deasy – electric guitar
- Larry Knechtel – harpsichord, organ, piano
- Sid Sharp – concertmaster
- Sherlie Matthews, Ginger Blake, Patrice Holloway – backing vocals

Technical

- Armin Steiner, Phil Yeend - engineer
