= Throw You Down =

Studio album by Thelma Houston
- Released: 1990
- Recorded: 1990
- Genre: Urban, contemporary R&B, Dance-pop, Quiet Storm
- Length: 43:18
- Label: Reprise
- Producer: Richard Perry

Thelma Houston chronology
Qualifying Heat	Throw You Down	Thelma Houston

Throw You Down is Thelma Houston's 15th studio album. It was her only album for Reprise Records, released in mid 1990. Richard Perry is credited with writing the lyrics and producing the Album. The album features the hits "Out of My Hands", "High" and the title track which reached Number 6 on the Dance charts in 1991.

== Production ==
The Fall of 1990 saw the release of Houston’s first album in six years, Throw You Down, a long-planned collaboration with producer Richard Perry which briefly extended Houston’s career as a minor R&B chart presence.

== Critical reception ==
In his review on the album, Ron Wynn from AllMusic stated: "Thelma Houston raised a few eyebrows in 1990 when this album was released. She still had a soulful, galvanizing voice, and she was equally good at fitting into pop, dance, or R&B contexts. While the album itself wasn't a great effort and was strictly aimed at the crossover market, thanks to producer Richard Perry, the single "Out of My Hands" was one of Houston's best songs and among the better unpublicized gems of '90."

== Charts ==
Throw You Down peaked at #38 on August 3rd 1991 and spent 5 weeks on the Chart according to the Billboard Hot 100. The title song reached No. 5 on the U.S. dance chart. A remix of “Don’t Leave Me This Way” was released, and once again charted on the Hot Dance Club Play chart at No. 19 in 1995. Subsequent singles include “I Need Somebody Tonight” and “All of That”.

== Track listing ==
1. "What He Was" (Glen Ballard, Richard Perry, Siedah Garrett)
2. "You Can Float In My Boat" (Brian Elliot)
3. "Throw You Down" (Dennis Matkowsky, Richard Wolf)
4. "A Man Who Isn't So Smooth" (Andy Goldmark, Carly Simon)
5. "High" (LeMel Humes)
6. "Serious" (Howie Rice, Janet "Planet" Cole, Michael Dunlap, Thelma Houston)
7. "Short Life" (Alee Willis, Danny Sembello)
8. "Got to Be Yourself" (Dyna Brein, Howie Rice, Michael Dunlap)
9. "I Won't Forget" (Lemel Humes, Mary Lee Kortes)
10. "Out of My Hands" (Marti Sharron, Tom Snow)

== Personnel ==
"Throw You Down"

- Glen Ballard - Composer
- Peggi Blu - Vocals (Background)
- Dyna Brein - Composer
- Janet Cole - Composer
- Michael Dunlap - Composer
- Brian Elliot - Composer
- Siedah Garrett - Composer, Vocals (Background)
- Andrew Goldmark - Composer
- Thelma Houston - Composer, Primary Artist
- LeMel Humes - Composer, Producer
- Jean Johnson - Vocals (Background)
- Mary Lee Kortes - Composer
- Dennis Matkosky - Composer
- Richard Perry - Composer, Producer
- Howie Rice - Composer, Producer
- Danny Sembello - Composer
- Marti Sharron - Composer
- Alfie Silas - Vocals (Background)
- Carly Simon - Composer
- Tom Snow - Composer
- Tina Thomas - Featured Artist
- Trick - Featured Artist
- Allee Willis - Composer
- Richard Wolf - Composer
- Monalisa Young - Vocals (Background)

== Single Releases ==
=== Throw You Down - CD Maxi Single ===
1. "Throw You Down (Single Mix)"
2. "Throw You Down (Throw Down Mix)"
3. "What He Has (12 Inch Mix)"
4. "Throw You Down (Rave Mix)"
5. "Throw You Down (Rave Dub)"
6. "Throw You Down (Down For The Count Dub)"

=== High - CD Promo Single ===
1. "High (New Single Remix)"
2. "High (Single Version)"
3. "High (Alternative Radio Mix)"
4. "High (House Remix)"
