= Thelma Houston (1983 album) =

Studio album by Thelma Houston
- Released: March 19,1983
- Recorded: 1982–83
- Genre: Urban, contemporary R&B, dance-pop
- Label: MCA
- Producer: Jai Winding, John Arrias

Thelma Houston chronology
Reachin' All Around (1982)	Thelma Houston (1983)	Qualifying Heat (1984)

Thelma Houston is Thelma Houston's 13th studio album and was her debut album on MCA Records. The album only generated commercial interest in the urban music market. It includes two modest R&B chart hits, "Working Girl" and "Just Like All the Rest."

== Track listing ==
1. "Make It Last" (Lana Bogan, Louie Shelton)
2. "Say Goodbye to Love" (Jai Winding)
3. "Running in Circles" (Brian Unger, Jon Carin, Mercury Caronia, Rudy Perrone)
4. "What For" (Randy McNeil)
5. "Just Like All the Rest" (Bob Esty, Lindy Friedman, Michelle Aller)
6. "Standing in the Light" (Bunny Hull, Jeff Hull)
7. "Take Me Through Your Lifetime" (Barry Ruff, Mitchell Kaplan, Renee Ruff)
8. "Givin' It All" (Michael Boltin, Patrick Henderson)
9. "Handsome Dudes" (Barry Mann, Cynthia Weil)
10. "Working Girl" (Bob Esty, Michelle Aller)

== Thelma Houston 1994 ==
Italian-only release (Fonit Cetra CDL378)

1. "Don't Leave Me This Way" – 4:03
2. "I'm Losing" (Ancora) – 3:20
3. "Cruel Beauty" (Bella senz'anima) – 3:41
4. "The Long Road" – 4:27
5. "A World of Love" (Un mondo d'amore) – 2:56
6. "My Life Is Mine" (Vita spericolata) – 4:20
7. "Don't Leave Me This way" [remix radio version] – 4:00
8. "Flame" (Almeno tu nell' universo) – 5:06
9. "The Way You Are" (Tu come stai) – 4:15
10. "More and More" – 3:06
11. "Shing Star" (Stella stai) – 3:34
12. "Saturday Night, Sunday Morning" – 3:15

Several remixes by Junior Vasquez and Joe T. Vanelli were released using the vocals of this 1994 version.

== Personnel ==
- Thelma Houston – lead vocals, backing vocals
- Dennis Herring, Michael Landau, Paul Jackson Jr. – guitar
- Eddie N. Watkins Jr., Neil Stubenhaus – bass guitar
- Jai Winding – acoustic piano, synthesizer
- Bob Esty, Paul Fox – synthesizer
- Ed Greene – drums
- Michael Fisher – percussion
- Chuck Findley, David Boruff, Slyde Hyde, Steve Madaio, Tom Saviano – horns
- Bunny Hull, Clifford Frazier, Julia Waters, Maxine Waters, Michelle Aller, Oren Waters, Sharon Robinson – backing vocals

Technical

- Charles Koppelman – executive producer
- Herb Ritts – photography
