= The Devil in Me (Thelma Houston album) =

Studio album by Thelma Houston
- Released: October 18, 1977
- Recorded: 1977
- Studio: Hitsville U.S.A., Hollywood, California
- Genre: R&B, urban, disco
- Label: Tamla
- Producer: Brenda Sutton, Michael B. Sutton, Brian Holland, Greg Wright, Michel Rubini, Clayton Ivey, Terry Woodford, Michael Masser

Thelma Houston chronology
Thelma & Jerry (1977)	The Devil in Me (1977)	Two to One (1978)

The Devil in Me is the sixth album by Thelma Houston released in 1977. While this album did not duplicate the commercial success of the Any Way You Like It album, it became a modest commercial success, peaking at No. 64 in the US album chart/No. 29 R&B. The lead single was the R&B and Club/Dance chart hit, "I'm Here Again". "I Can't Go On Living Without Your Love" was issued as a double-sided 12" single back-to-back with Diana Ross' "Your Love Is So Good to Me".

The album was arranged by Kim Richmond, James Anthony Carmichael, Gordon C. Berg, Greg Wright, Michel Rubini and Michael Omartian. The cover photograph was by Tom Kelley.

The Devil in Me was released on CD in 2018 by Soulmusic Records, in a compilation that also includes Ready to Roll, Ride to the Rainbow and Reachin' All Around.

== Track listing ==
1. "I'm Here Again" (Brenda Sutton, Kathy Wakefield, Michael B. Sutton) produced by Brenda and Michael B. Sutton, arranged by Kim Richmond
2. "It's Just Me Feeling Good" (Brenda Sutton, Michael B. Sutton, Pam Sawyer) produced by Brenda and Michael B. Sutton, arranged by Kim Richmond
3. "I Can't Go on Living Without Your Love" (Brian Holland, Edward Holland, Jr., Richard Davis) produced by Brian Holland, arranged by James Anthony Carmichael
4. "Triflin'" (Greg Wright, Karin Patterson) produced by Greg Wright, arranged by Greg Wright and Gordon C. Berg
5. "Give Me Something To Believe In" (Michel Rubini, Bob Siller, Don Dunn) produced and arranged by Michel Rubini
6. "Memories" (Michel Rubini, Bob Siller) produced and arranged by Michel Rubini
7. "I've Got the Devil in Me" (Michel Rubini, Harold Beatty) produced and arranged by Michel Rubini
8. "Baby, I Love You Too Much" (Barbara Wyrick, Mickey Buckins) produced by Clayton Ivey and Terry Woodford
9. "Your Eyes" (Michael Masser, Pam Sawyer) produced and arranged by Michael Omartian
