= A Woman's Touch =

Studio album by Thelma Houston
- Released: August 14, 2007
- Recorded: 2006–07
- Genre: Soul, Smooth Jazz, House
- Length: 51:36
- Label: Shout Factory Records/Sony Records/BMG
- Producer: Jeff Palo, Thelma Houston

Thelma Houston chronology
20th Century Masters – The Millennium Collection: The Best of Thelma Houston (2007)	A Woman's Touch (2007)	Divas of Disco – Live (2010)

Professional ratings
Review scores
Source	Rating
Allmusic	3/5 stars

A Woman's Touch is the seventeenth studio album by singer and songwriter, Thelma Houston. A Woman's Touch is an album that consists of her renditions of vintage R&B and Pop songs by male singers such as Luther Vandross, Glen Campbell, Marvin Gaye and Sting. The lead single from the album is "Brand New Day."

== Track listing ==
1. "Wake Up Everybody" (Victor Carstarphen, Gene McFadden)
2. "Never Too Much" (Luther Vandross)
3. "Brand New Day" (Sting)
4. "Ain't That Peculiar" (Smokey Robinson, Warren "Pete" Moore, Marvin Tarplin, Robert Rogers)
5. "By the Time I Get to Phoenix" (Jimmy Webb)
6. "Distant Lover" (Marvin Gaye, Gwen Fuqua, Sandra Greene)
7. "Love and Happiness" (Mabon "Teenie" Hodges)
8. "Disco Heat"/"Mighty Real" (James Wirrick, Eric Robinson)
9. "That's the Way of the World" (Maurice White, Charles Stepney, Verdine White)
10. "Please Send Me Someone to Love" (Percy Mayfield)
