= You Used to Hold Me So Tight =

Single by Thelma Houston

from the album Qualifying Heat
- Released: 1984
- Genre: Post-disco, garage house
- Length: 5:37 (12" Version)
- Label: MCA Records
- Songwriter(s): Jimmy Jam and Terry Lewis
- Producer(s): Jam & Lewis

"You Used to Hold Me So Tight" is a song written and produced by Jimmy Jam and Terry Lewis for American singer Thelma Houston's 1984 album Qualifying Heat. Released as a single in mid-1984, "You Used to Hold Me So Tight" became a success on the U.S. charts, peaking at number seven on the Hot Dance Club Play chart. Although it missed the Billboard Hot 100, the song peaked at number thirteen on the Hot Black Singles chart.

== Samples ==
The single has been sampled in seven songs, notably among them "Ancodia" by 808 State from their 1989 album Ninety.

== Track listings ==
MCA 12" single

1. "You Used to Hold Me So Tight" (12" Version) – 5:37
2. "You Used to Hold Me So Tight" (Dub) – 6:39
3. "You Used to Hold Me So Tight" (LP Version) – 5:42

UK 12" single

1. "You Used to Hold Me So Tight" (Liquid People Y2K RE-Groove)
2. "You Used to Hold Me So Tight" (Liquid People Y2K RE-Groove Dub)
