= Thelma Houston (1972 album) =

Studio album by Thelma Houston
- Released: 1973
- Recorded: 1972
- Genre: R&B
- Label: Mowest
- Producer: Joe Porter

Thelma Houston chronology
Sunshower (1969)	Thelma Houston (1973)	I've Got the Music in Me (1975)

Professional ratings
Review scores
Source	Rating
Allmusic	3/5 stars

Thelma Houston (1972) is the second album by Thelma Houston, recorded in 1972 and released in 1973. The album includes the single, "Me and Bobby McGee". This is her first album recorded with Motown Records under the Mowest label. Two versions of the album were issued, a ten track version in the US and a fourteen track version in the UK and Germany. The album was reissued on CD in an expanded edition by Soulmusic Records in 2012.

The album was arranged by Artie Butler, Michael Omartian, Gene Page, James Anthony Carmichael and John Myles.

== Track listing ==
For the 1972 US album released on MoWest MW1023L

Side one

1. "What If" (Patti Dahlstrom) - 2:58 arranged by Artie Butler
2. "There's No Such Thing as Love" - 3:00 (Anthony Newley, Ian Fraser) arranged by Michael Omartian
3. "Me and Bobby McGee" - 3:01 (Fred Foster, Kris Kristofferson) produced by Jerry Marcellino and Mel Larson, arranged by Gene Page and John Myles
4. "I'm Letting Go" - 3:40 (Patti Dahlstrom, Severin Browne) arranged by Artie Butler
5. "Do Something About It" - 2:27 (Ben Peters) arranged by Michael Omartian

Side two

1. "There Is a God" - 4:57 (Andrew Cooper) arranged by Artie Butler
2. "Black California" - 3:00 (Barry Mann, Cynthia Weil) arranged by Michael Omartian
3. "And I Never Did" - 3:00 (Patti Dahlstrom) arranged by Artie Butler
4. "Blackberries" - 3:07 (Barry White) produced by Al Cleveland and Edward Langford, arranged by Gene Page
5. "And I Thought You Loved Me" - 2:45 (Dino Fekaris, Nick Zesses) arranged by Artie Butler

For the 1973 UK album released on MoWest MWS7003

Side one

1. "No One's Gonna Be a Fool Forever" (Michael Masser, Pam Sawyer)
2. "Black California"
3. "I Ain't Going Nowhere" (Gloria Jones, Pam Sawyer)
4. "Nothing Left to Give" (Jerry Marcellino, Mel Larson)
5. "Stealing in The Name of the Lord" (Paul Kelly)
6. "Blackberries"
7. "And I Thought You Loved Me"

Side two

1. "I Ain't That Easy to Lose"
2. "What If"
3. "There's No Such Thing as Love"
4. "Me and Bobby McGee"
5. "I'm Letting Go"
6. "Do Something About It"
7. "And I Never Did"
