= Woodstock '79 =

1979 music festival

Woodstock '79 was a rock concert that took place at the Felt Forum at Madison Square Garden, New York City on August 24 and 25, 1979, the year of the 10th anniversary of the original Woodstock Festival.

The word "Woodstock" did not appear in the advertisement for the event, it was simply billed as "Celebration: Ten Years Later."

Appearances of some of the original 1969 festival musicians performers, were there for jam sessions with Richie Havens, Taj Mahal, Alhaji Bai Konte, Dembo Konte, Country Joe and the Fish, Canned Heat, Jeff "Skunk" Baxter and Elliott Randall. Also appearing were Rick Danko, Jorma Kaukonen, Stephen Stills, Paul Butterfield, and Johnny Winter among others.

In 1991, an 80-minute video with the title The Celebration Continues:Woodstock '79 was released.

== Songs ==
1. "Woodstock Boogie"
2. "New York Boogie"
3. "Here Comes the Sun"
4. "On the Road Again"
5. "Stand"
6. "Solid Gone"
7. "Paint My Mailbox Blue"
8. "George Buck" - Taj Mahal, Alhaji Bai Konte, Dembo Konte
9. "Save the Whales"
10. "Stage Fright" - Rick Danko and Paul Butterfield
11. "Crazy Mama"
12. "Sail on Sailor"
13. "Lose Control"
14. "Freight Train"
15. "Nobody Left to Crown"
16. "Chicken Shack"
17. "Roots"
18. "Freedom"
