= Any Way You Like It =

Studio album by Thelma Houston
- Released: October 28, 1976
- Recorded: 1972–1976
- Genre: R&B; urban; disco
- Label: Tamla
- Producer: Hal Davis; Michael Lovesmith; Michael B. Sutton; Harold Johnson; Joe Porter; Clayton Ivey; Terry Woodford; Michael Masser; Ronald Miller; William Goldstein

Thelma Houston chronology
I've Got the Music in Me (1975)	Any Way You Like It (1976)	The Devil in Me (1977)

Any Way You Like It is the fourth album by Thelma Houston, released late October 1976 on Tamla Records. The album features energetic disco songs with fierce vocal performances by Houston on side 1, while side 2 focuses on ballads. It includes the major hit single, "Don't Leave Me This Way", Houston's remake of the Harold Melvin & the Blue Notes song, zooming to No. 1 in the US charts. In the US, "If It's the Last Thing I Do", a track originally recorded in 1972, was chosen for the second single release on MoWest, while Europe had an edited version of the Stevie Wonder cover, "Don't Know Why I Love You", produced and arranged by Michael Lovesmith.

A re-recorded version of "Don't Leave Me This Way" was #19 on the dance charts in December 1994.

The album was arranged by Arthur G. Wright, Michael Lovesmith, Harold Johnson, Paul Riser, Clayton Ivey, Ted Stovall, Michael Omartian, Perry Botkin, Jr. and Terry Woodford. The cover photograph was by Harry Langdon.

== Track listing ==
1. "Any Way You Like It" (Michael Lovesmith, Thelma Houston, Tony Jones) produced and arranged by Michael Lovesmith
2. "Don't Leave Me This Way" (Cary Gilbert, Kenny Gamble, Leon Huff) produced by Hal Davis, arranged by Arthur G. Wright
3. "Don't Know Why I Love You" (Don Hunter, Lula Hardaway, Paul Riser, Stevie Wonder) produced and arranged by Michael Lovesmith
4. "Come to Me" (Don Daniels, Jermaine Jackson, Kathy Wakefield) produced by Hal Davis and Michael B. Sutton, arranged by Arthur G. Wright
5. "Don't Make Me Pay (For Another Girl's Mistake)" (Michael Lovesmith) produced and arranged by Michael Lovesmith
6. "Sharing Something Perfect Between Ourselves" (Andrew Porter, Harold Johnson) produced and arranged by Howard Johnson
7. "If It's the Last Thing I Do" (Sammy Cahn, Saul Chaplin) produced by Joe Porter, arranged by Paul Riser
8. "Differently" (Ralph Graham) produced by Clayton Ivey and Terry Woodford, arranged by Clayton Ivey, Ted Stovall and Terry Woodford

=== 2015 bonus tracks ===
1. "Do You Know Where You're Going To" (Michael Masser, Gerry Goffin) produced by Michael Masser, arranged by Perry Botkin Jr.
2. "Together" (Pam Sawyer, Michael Masser) produced by Michael Masser and Michael Omartian, arranged by Michael Omartian
3. "Today Will Soon Be Yesterday" (Pam Sawyer, Michael B. Sutton) produced by Hal Davis, arranged by Arthur G. Wright
4. "You've Been Doing Wrong for So Long" (Frank L. Johnson, Terry Woodford) produced by Clayton Ivey and Terry Woodford, arranged by Clayton Ivey, Ted Stovall and Terry Woodford
5. "One Out of Every Six" (Censored Version) (Ronald Miller, George Schlatter, William Goldstein) - from the MGM Motion Picture, Norman... Is That You? produced by Ronald Miller and William Goldstein
6. "Don't Leave Me This Way" (US Tamla single edit) produced by Hal Davis, arranged by Arthur G. Wright

== Charts ==
Chart performance for Any Way You Like It
Chart (1977)	Peak position
Australian Albums (Kent Music Report)	18
