= Breakwater Cat =

Studio album by Thelma Houston
- Released: 1980
- Recorded: 1980
- Genre: Pop rock, dance-pop
- Label: RCA
- Producer: James Gadson, Michael Stewart

Breakwater Cat is the tenth album by American singer Thelma Houston, released in 1980 on RCA Records. The 12" single "Suspicious Minds" became a popular club hit. Breakwater Cat contains five songs written by Jimmy Webb, who was also the executive producer of the album.

== Track listing ==
All songs were written by Jimmy Webb; except where indicated.

1. "Breakwater Cat" – 3:55
2. "Long and Lasting Love" – 5:30
3. "Before There Could Be Me" – 3:12
4. "Gone" – 3:43
5. "What Was That Song" – 4:19
6. "Suspicious Minds" (Mark James) – 4:15
7. "Down the Backstairs of My Life" (Eric Mercury, William Smith) – 3:00
8. "Understand Your Man" (Alan Gordon) – 3:27
9. "Lost and Found" (Daniel Moore) – 4:20
10. "Something We May Never Know" (Shelby Flint) – 3:38

== Personnel ==
Music

- Thelma Houston – vocals
- Sonny Burke – piano, arrangements
- Matthew McCauley – string and horn arrangements
- David T. Walker, Tim May, Steve Beckmeier, Carlos Rios, Steve Hunter, Fred Tackett, Greg Poree – guitar
- David Shields, Eddie N. Watkins Jr., Keni Burke, Scott Edwards, Dennis Belfield, Reggie McBride – bass guitar
- Gary Morse - steel guitar on "Something We May Never Know"
- Jerry Peters - keyboards
- James Gadson – drums
- Jerry Hey - horn
- Paulinho da Costa – percussion
- Clydie King – backing vocals
- Greg Wright – backing vocals
- Oren Waters – backing vocals
- Tom Kelly – backing vocals

Production

- James Gadson – producer
- Michael Stewart – producer
- Mike Vickers – assistant producer
- Jimmy Webb – executive producer
- Brian Christian – engineer
- Frank "Cheech" D'Amici – engineer
- Mark Linett – engineer
- Rick Hart – engineer
- Rick Ruggieri – engineer
- Gribbitt! – art direction
- Henry Vizcarra – art direction
- Tim Bryant – art direction
- Charles Veal, Jr. – contractor
- Jerry Hoff – contractor
- Sid Sharp – contractor
- Lynne Morse – A&R coordinator
- Linda Gerrity – production coordinator
- Glenn Parsons - design
- Gribbitt! - design
- John Arrias – mixing
- Ron Slenzak – photography
