= Thelma Houston =

American singer (born 1943)

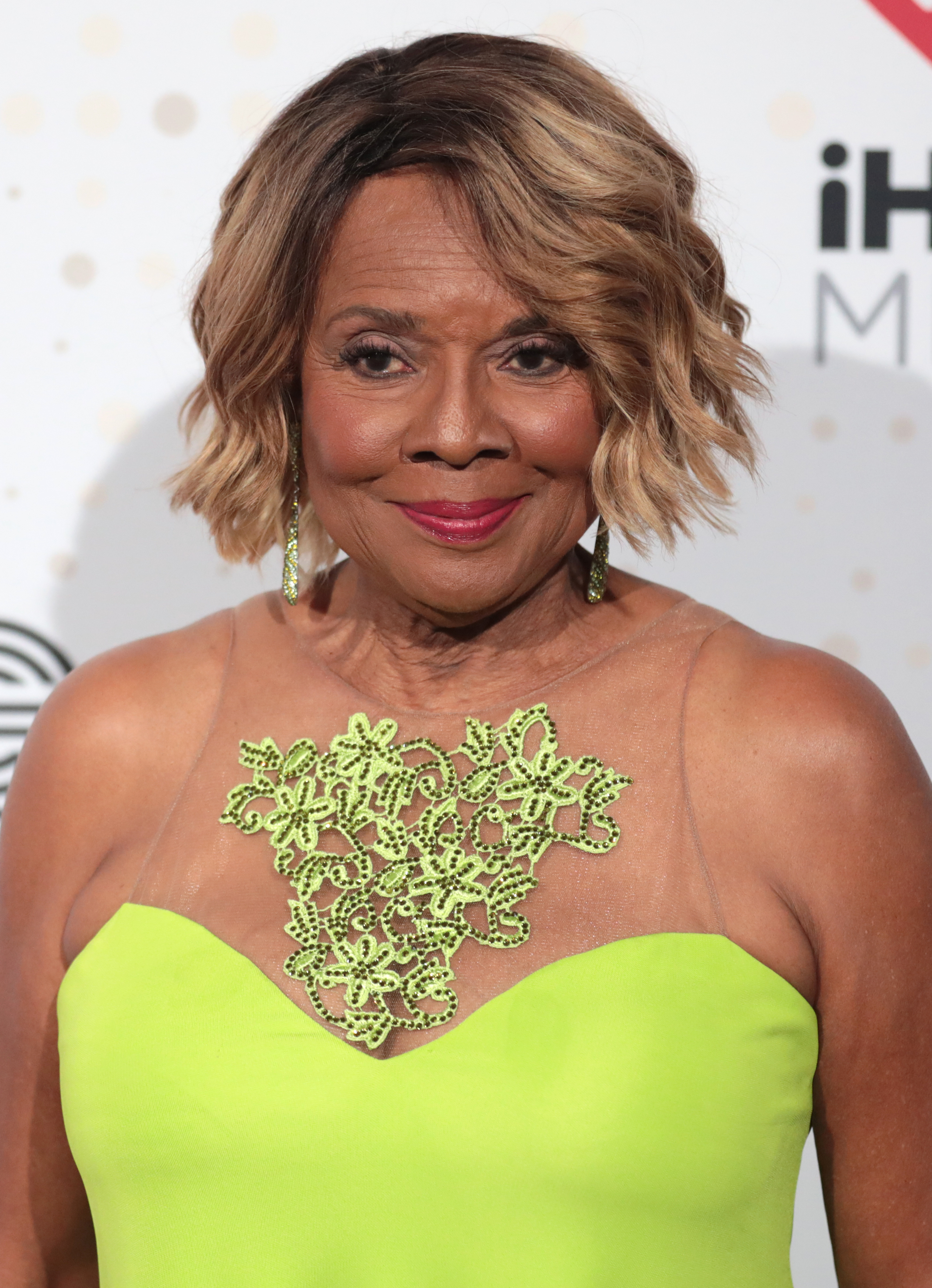
- Houston in 2023

Background information
- Born: Thelma Jackson; May 7, 1943 (age 83); Leland, Mississippi, U.S.
- Genres: R&B; soul; disco; gospel
- Occupations: Singer; actress
- Years active: 1968–present
- Labels: ABC Dunhill; Motown; RCA; MCA; Reprise; Shout Factory
- Formerly of: Sisters of Glory
- Website: thelmahouston.com

Thelma Houston (née Jackson; born May 7, 1943) is an American singer and actress. Beginning her recording career in the late 1960s, Houston scored a number-one hit in 1977 with her recording of "Don't Leave Me This Way", which won the Grammy for Best Female R&B Vocal Performance.

== Biography ==
=== Early life and career ===
Houston was born in Leland, Mississippi into a black American family. Her mother was a cotton picker. She and her three sisters grew up primarily in Long Beach, California. After marrying and having two children, she joined the Art Reynolds Singers gospel group and was subsequently signed as a recording artist with Dunhill Records. Despite her surname, she is unrelated to Whitney Houston.

In 1969, Houston released her debut album, titled Sunshower, produced, arranged and composed by Jimmy Webb except for one track. In 1971 she signed with Motown Records but her early recordings with them were largely unsuccessful. Her most notable single during that period was "You've Been Doing Wrong for So Long" which peaked at No. 64 on the US Billboard R&B chart in 1974. However Houston's vocal prowess on that track secured her a nomination for a Best Female R&B Vocal Performance. In 1973 Motown Productions announced a projected biographical film of Dinah Washington that would star Houston; however the project was dropped due to difficulties in getting clearance from Washington's relatives. In April 1974, Houston joined the cast of The Marty Feldman Comedy Machine, playing various characters during the show's skits. The show was canceled in August and for the next several years her work was limited to demo recordings and performing at small venues.

Houston took acting classes and received her first role in the 1975 made-for-television film Death Scream. In that same year Sheffield Lab released I've Got the Music in Me, a direct-to-disc recording by Thelma Houston and Pressure Cooker that went on to become a benchmark vinyl recording for audiophiles. It was added to the National Recording Registry in 2025 The following year she recorded songs for the soundtrack of the film The Bingo Long Traveling All-Stars & Motor Kings starring Billy Dee Williams and James Earl Jones. In 1975 Houston appeared on the Golden Globe Award broadcast performing the nominated song "On & On" and also was featured in a tribute to Berry Gordy on that year's American Music Award broadcast singing "You've Made Me So Very Happy". That year Houston's version of "Do You Know Where You're Going To" was being set for single release when it was pulled and the song given to Diana Ross to serve as the theme song for the movie Mahogany. In 1976 Houston sang backing vocals for Motown labelmate Jermaine Jackson on his album My Name Is Jermaine.

=== "Don't Leave Me This Way" ===
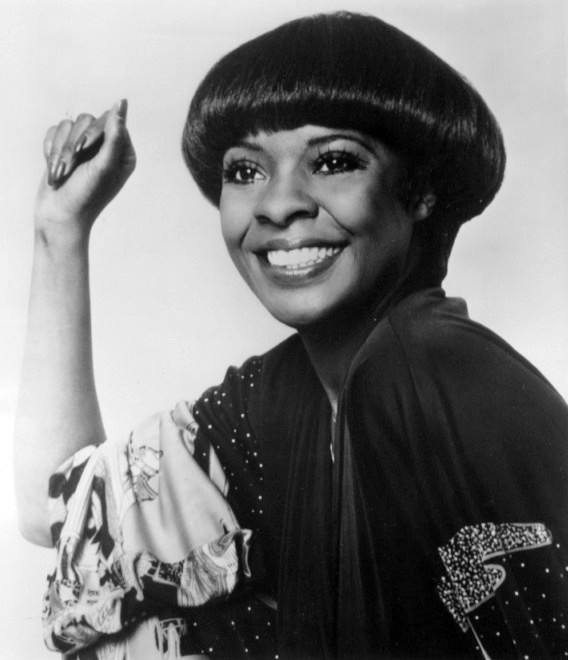
Houston in 1977

Houston released her third solo album Any Way You Like It in 1976. The first single released was her version of Harold Melvin & the Blue Notes' 1975 song "Don't Leave Me This Way". In February 1977 the track hit No. 1 in the U.S. on the R&B and Club Play Singles charts, then in April 1977 on the Billboard Hot 100. "Don't Leave Me This Way" won Houston the Best Female R&B Vocal Performance at the Grammys for 1977. Besides its US success "Don't Leave Me This Way" became a hit in at least twelve countries, including the UK where it reached No. 13 despite the concurrent single release of the Harold Melvin & the Blue Notes original, which reached No. 7. Also in 1977 Houston teamed up with Jerry Butler to record the album Thelma & Jerry and that November 1977 she co-starred in the film Game Show Models. It was announced in February 1977 that Houston would star as Bessie Smith in a filmation of the play Me and Bessie, to be produced by Motown; after an announcement that December that Houston was set to portray Bessie Smith in a biopic to be produced in 1978 by Columbia Pictures nothing more was heard of the project.

The second single from Any Way You Like It was Houston's rendition of "If It's the Last Thing I Do", a standard written by Saul Chaplin and Sammy Cahn; the track had been recorded and prepped for single release in 1973 but canceled. The impact of "If It's the Last Thing I Do" was far less than that of "Don't Leave Me This Way", as the former fell short of both the R&B top ten and the Pop top 40.

=== Departure from Motown ===
With the lead single from her 1978 album The Devil in Me: "I'm Here Again", Houston returned to the style of "Don't Leave Me This Way" without recapturing the earlier single's success. Houston did enjoy considerable commercial success in 1978 via the inclusion of her track "Love Masterpiece" on the Thank God It's Friday soundtrack album which sold double platinum but her own album release that year Ready to Roll again failing to consolidate the stardom augured by "Don't Leave Me This Way". The album's second single: "Saturday Night, Sunday Morning", gradually accrued airplay entering the national charts in March 1979 and ascending as high as No. 34 (No. 19 R&B) that June. "Saturday Night, Sunday Morning" was issued on a new album by Houston: Ride to the Rainbow but the track's relative success was not enough to forestall Houston's planned departure from Motown.

=== 1980s ===
Houston continued recording music into the 1980s, beginning with the RCA release Breakwater Cat which reunited her with Jimmy Webb who produced her debut single Sunshower and which like their earlier collaboration was a commercially overlooked critical success. During the December 22, 1984 Billboard magazine interview, Houston admitted to "'no real commercial success' since the single 'Don't Leave Me This Way' broke on the Pop charts in late 1976" indicating that the disco backlash had left her with "no real base of audience support" and that her current album Qualifying Heat, executive produced by Houston herself, was a concentrated initiative to restore her as a viable chart presence; the album featured three cuts from Jimmy Jam and Terry Lewis – including the single "You Used to Hold Me So Tight" – and production work from Glen Ballard, Dennis Lambert, Cliff Magness and – in his first known recording work – Lenny Kravitz (then billed as Romeo Blue), who each produced a cut apiece. "You Use to Hold Me So Tight" became Houston's most successful post-1970s release with a No. 13 R&B peak, but its parent album was a comparative failure – charting No. 41 R&B – and Houston would not cut another album for six years.

The constant ranking of her 1980s releases as moderate or minor R&B hits led Houston to concentrate on alternate exposure. After appearing in the independent film The Seventh Dwarf in 1979 Houston made guest-starring appearances into the mid-1980s in several popular television programs including Cagney & Lacey, Simon & Simon – a January 1986 appearance that featured her performing "You Used to Hold Me So Tight" – and Faerie Tale Theatre. Houston also appeared in the 1987 CBS after school special Little Miss Perfect (1987) – as "Prison Singer" – in the 1988 film And God Created Woman.

On the May 19, 1985, NBC broadcast Motown Returns to the Apollo Houston performed "What a Diff'rence a Day Makes" in the guise of Dinah Washington. Houston continued to contribute to movie soundtracks, recording "Keep It Light" for the 1985 film Into the Night and she remade Bill Withers' "Lean on Me" for the 1989 film entitled Lean on Me. Houston also co-wrote and sang back-up on the song "Be Yourself" for Patti LaBelle's 1989 album of the same title.

=== 1990s ===
The Fall of 1990 saw the release of Houston's first album in six years, Throw You Down, a long-planned collaboration with producer Richard Perry which briefly extended Houston's career as a minor R&B chart presence. The title song reached No. 5 on the U.S. dance chart. A remix of "Don't Leave Me This Way" was released, and once again charted on the Hot Dance Club Play chart at No. 19 in 1995. Subsequent singles include "I Need Somebody Tonight" and "All of That".

In 1994, Houston participated in an AIDS benefit at New York's Algonquin Hotel, performing gospel music with Phoebe Snow, Chaka Khan and CeCe Peniston as "Sisters of Glory". Intended as a one-off performance troupe, the Sisters of Glory remained together – with the addition of Mavis Staples and Lois Walden, and without Chaka Khan – to perform at Woodstock '94. Houston performed with the Sisters of Glory for the Pope in Vatican City and in 1995 Houston, Phoebe Snow, CeCe Peniston, Lois Walden and Albertina Walker recorded the Warner Brothers album Good News in Hard Times as the Sisters of Glory.

Houston provided lead vocals on several tracks of guitarist Scott Henderson's 1997 Atlantic album, Tore Down House, and in 1998 she made cameo appearances in two films: in 54 Houston portrayed herself singing "Have Yourself a Merry Little Christmas" supposedly at Studio 54, and in Beloved Houston played 'One of The Thirty Women'.

=== Recent career ===
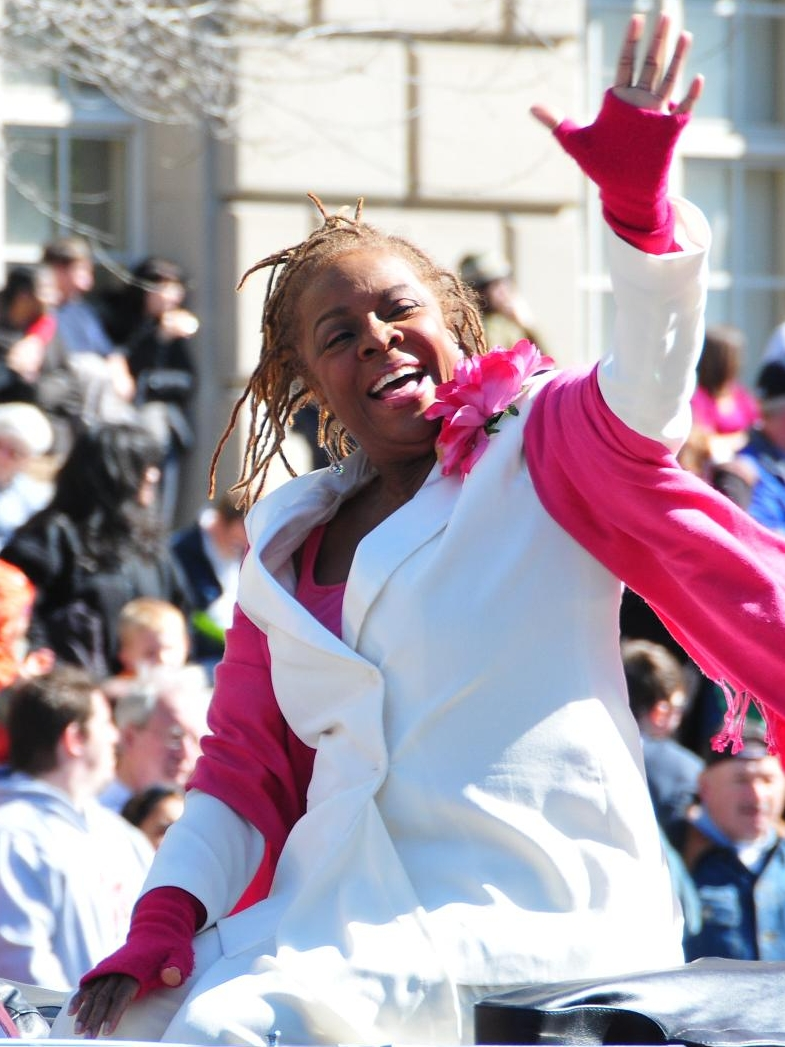
Houston in 2009

In 2000, Houston toured successfully throughout Australia in the stage musical version of Fame. In 2002 she again guested on a Scott Henderson album, providing lead vocals for two of the tracks on Well to the Bone. Upon returning to the U.S. Houston toured with Nile Rodgers and Chic, and was among the opening acts of the originally intended finale of Cher's Farewell Tour in Toronto on October 31, 2003. Houston regularly performs at Teatro ZinZanni in Seattle and San Francisco.

Her version of "Don't Leave Me This Way" continues to be popular today. In recent years she has been invited to sing this song on dozens of TV shows and specials including NBC's Today Show, ABC's Motown 45 and The Disco Ball...A 30-Year Celebration, and PBS' specials American Soundtrack: Rhythm, Love and Soul, Soul Superstars, and Old School Superstars. "Don't Leave Me This Way" was mentioned by VH1 as being among the greatest dance songs in 2000, and was ranked No. 86 on the channel's countdown of The 100 Greatest One-Hit Wonders. She won an episode of the NBC show Hit Me, Baby, One More Time with her renditions of her own hit and "Fallin'" by Alicia Keys. On September 20, 2004, Houston's rendition of "Don't Leave Me This Way" was inducted into the Dance Music Hall of Fame in New York City.

On August 14, 2007, Houston released her first studio album in seventeen years, A Woman's Touch. The album was produced by Peitor Angell and features cover versions of songs by male artists such as Luther Vandross, Marvin Gaye, and Sting that Houston had been inspired by. The first single from the album was "Brand New Day". On August 20, 2007, Houston's 1984 album Qualifying Heat was reissued as an import title in the U.S. with a bonus track.

She sang "Don't Leave Me This Way" on American Idol on April 22, 2009, and on America's Got Talent on September 16, 2009.

On July 29, 2013, a collaboration between Thelma and Los Angeles-based producer Janitor, titled "Enemy", premiered on SoundCloud. Several tracks followed, culminating in the release of an EP, "Forty-Two", in September. This is the first new material from Thelma Houston in six years.

She is featured on British singer Morrissey's single "Bobby, Don't You Think They Know?", released on streaming platforms on January 10, 2020, from his album I Am Not a Dog on a Chain.

In 2024, Houston competed in season eleven of The Masked Singer as "Clock". She made it all the way to the semifinals, and finished in third place overall. As an encore, she sang her song "Don't Leave Me This Way".

== Discography ==
- Sunshower (1969)
- Thelma Houston (1972)
- I've Got the Music in Me (with Pressure Cooker) (1975)
- Any Way You Like It (1976)
- The Devil in Me (1977)
- Thelma & Jerry (with Jerry Butler) (1977)
- Two to One (with Jerry Butler) (1978)
- Ready to Roll (1978)
- Ride to the Rainbow (1979)
- Breakwater Cat (1980)
- Never Gonna Be Another One (1981)
- Reachin' All Around (1982)
- Thelma Houston (1983)
- Qualifying Heat (1984)
- Throw You Down (1990)
- Thelma Houston (1994)
- A Woman's Touch (2007)

== Filmography ==
=== Films ===
- 1975: Death Scream — Lady Wing Ding
- 1977: Game Show Models — Dana Sheridan
- 1979: The Seventh Dwarf
- 1988: And God Created Woman — prison singer
- 1998: 54 — herself
- 1998: Beloved — one of The Thirty Women

=== Television (guest) ===
- 1969: The Ed Sullivan Show- guest singer, singing "Didn't We"(December 8)
- 1969: The Price of Fame – Guest singer, singing "Jumpin' Jack Flash"
- 1971: The Marty Feldman Comedy Machine — various characters
- 1975: The Golden Globe Award — Guest Singer
- 1980: The Two Ronnies- Guest singer, singing " The Candyman"
- 1985: Cagney & Lacey (5,11: Play it again, Santa) — Ellie Hendricks
- 1986: Simon & Simon — Venutia
- 1986: Tall Tales & Legends — Edna
- 1987: Little Miss Perfect — Ms. Bonner
- 1989: Super Dave — Guest singer, "Lean on Me"
- 2024: The Masked Singer - Herself/Clock, 3rd place”

=== Soundtracks ===
- 1976: The Bingo Long Traveling All-Stars & Motor Kings — "Steal on Home", "Razzle Dazzle"
- 1976: Norman... Is That You? — "One Out of Every Six"
- 1978: Thank God It's Friday — "Love Masterpiece"
- 1984: Getting Physical — "Hot Dance", "To Be Free"
- 1985: Into the Night — "Keep It Light"
- 1989: Lean on Me — "Lean on Me"

== See also ==
- List of number-one hits (United States)
- List of artists who reached number one on the Hot 100 (U.S.)
- List of number-one dance hits (United States)
- List of artists who reached number one on the U.S. Dance chart
