= Running on Empty (song) =

- Japanese cover

Single by Jackson Browne

from the album Running on Empty
- B-side: "Nothing But Time"
- Released: January 1978
- Recorded: August 27, 1977
- Venue: Merriweather Post Pavilion, Columbia, Maryland
- Genre: Rock
- Length: 5:20 (album version); 4:49 (7" version)
- Label: Asylum
- Songwriter: Jackson Browne
- Producer: Jackson Browne

Jackson Browne singles chronology
"The Pretender" (1977)	"Running on Empty" (1978)	"Stay/The Load-Out" (1978)

"Running on Empty" is a song by American singer-songwriter Jackson Browne. It is the title track of his 1977 live album of the same name, recorded at a concert at Merriweather Post Pavilion in Columbia, Maryland, on August 27, 1977. A number 11 hit on the US Billboard Hot 100 when it was released as a single, it spent seventeen weeks on the chart after debuting on February 11, 1978, at position 72. Rolling Stone ranked it at number 496 on its list of "The 500 Greatest Songs of All Time" in 2010 and number 492 in 2004; further, it is one of Browne's signature songs. "Running on Empty" was most popular in Canada, where it spent two weeks at number four.

== History ==
Browne wrote the song while driving to the studio each day to make The Pretender, according to Rolling Stone magazine: "I was always driving around with no gas in the car," Browne is quoted. "I just never bothered to fill up the tank because — how far was it anyway? Just a few blocks."

The song starts off with an immediate, propulsive backbeat, with the melody carried by piano and throughout laced by David Lindley's distinctive lap steel guitar work. Browne receives vocal back up from Rosemary Butler and Doug Haywood.

Rolling Stone writer Paul Nelson saw "Running on Empty" as embodying a "tenacious, win/lose duality" and being "what daydreamers have nightmares about". Music critic Maury Dean said that the song "sees the whole world as one big energy junkie, groaning for another petrochemical fix" and that as the singer "runs towards the sun, he feels he's losing time. And Energy."

Billboard described the song as "fiery rock 'n' roll that continues in intensity throughout" while containing "serious lyric content" from the singer/songwriter's "identifiable gritty vocal". Record World predicted that it "should be [Browne's] biggest pop radio hit in several years," saying that "the tempo is quick, the vocal energetic." Ultimate Classic Rock critic Michael Gallucci rated it as Browne's greatest song. Classic Rock History critic Brian Kachejian rated it as Browne's 6th greatest song.

With its number 11 peak on the Hot 100 in Spring 1978, "Running on Empty" was Browne's third-biggest hit single in his career (trailing only "Doctor My Eyes" and "Somebody's Baby"), and subsequently became his most-played song on classic rock radio formats.

== Later uses ==
The song was featured prominently in the 1994 film Forrest Gump as the main theme for a running montage in which the title character treks across the United States on foot.

In August 2008, Browne sued presumptive Republican presidential nominee John McCain, the Ohio Republican Party, and the Republican National Committee for unauthorized use of "Running on Empty" in a television commercial mocking presumptive Democratic nominee Barack Obama's energy policy. The case was settled out of court for an undisclosed sum in July 2009, with the McCain campaign, the Ohio Republican Party, and the Republican National Committee issuing a joint apology for using the song. Browne said, "I'm really happy that we got this statement from them. It's great to have it affirmed that these [copyright and usage] laws stand. I've had an idea of how my songs are protected and how money is collected and how making a living as a musician works for my whole career, and it's great to have it affirmed and to know that we're absolutely right in standing up to them."

Various concert clips of "Running On Empty" from during and after 1977 are known to exist, though none from the concert where the original audio is taken; further, no formal music video was released. In June 2019, Browne's official YouTube channel posted a montage of Joel Bernstein photos from the 1977 Jackson Browne Running On Empty Tour in a video created by Andrew Thomas.

== Personnel ==
- Jackson Browne – vocals, guitar
- Danny Kortchmar – guitar
- David Lindley – lap steel guitar
- Craig Doerge – piano
- Leland Sklar – bass guitar
- Russ Kunkel – drums
- Rosemary Butler, Doug Haywood – background vocals

=== Production ===
- Greg Ladanyi – mix engineer

== Chart performance ==
=== Weekly charts ===
Chart (1978)	Peak position
Canada RPM Top Singles	4
U.S. Billboard Hot 100	11
US Cashbox Top 100	6

=== Year-end charts ===
Chart (1978)	Rank
Canada	45
U.S. Billboard Hot 100	82
