= You Love the Thunder =

- 7" picture sleeve

Single by Jackson Browne

from the album Running on Empty
- B-side: "The Road"
- Released: Early 1978
- Recorded: September 6, 1977
- Venue: Garden State Arts Center, Holmdel, New Jersey
- Genre: Rock
- Length: 3:57
- Label: Asylum
- Songwriter: Jackson Browne
- Producer: Jackson Browne

Jackson Browne singles chronology
"Stay" / "The Load-Out" (1978)	"You Love the Thunder" (1978)	"Boulevard" (1980)

"You Love the Thunder" is a song written and performed by American singer-songwriter Jackson Browne from his 1977 live album, Running on Empty, recorded at a concert at Garden State Arts Center in Holmdel, New Jersey, on September 6, 1977. Released as the third single a full year after the album came out, it only reached #109 on Billboards Bubbling Under Hot 100 Singles chart, though it received increased Album-Oriented Rock airplay. The B-side of the U.S. single was "The Road"; however, the B-side for the British single was "Cocaine".

== History ==
The lyrics seem to describe the relationship of a musician and a spouse or girlfriend who comes along on tour, keeping with the theme of the Running on Empty album, but they can be read more universally, as well:

You love the thunder, and you love the rain —
What you see revealed within the anger is worth the pain.
And before the lightning fades and you surrender,
You've got a second to look at the dark side of the man.

You love the thunder and you love the rain —
You know your hunger like you know your name.
And I know you wonder how you ever came
To be a woman in love with a man in search of the flame...

In his 1978 review of the album, Paul Nelson wrote: "Browne forges a temporary relationship with a kindred spirit, only to realize 'You can dream/But you can never go back the way you came.'" Billboard commented on the "engagingly unpolished vocals" and "dynamic instrumental track."

== Reception ==
Cash Box said that it has a "moderate pace, good lyrics and a strong hook," as well as "effective" slide guitar and backing vocals.

Ultimate Classic Rock critic Michael Gallucci rated it as Browne's 9th greatest song, saying that it "sympathizes with the wives, girlfriends and groupies who are along for the ride" while the singer is on tour.

Glide critic Lee Zimmerman rated it as one of 10 Jackson Browne songs that should have been a hit, calling it "a respectable rocker sung to a woman who seems prone to provocation and inciting a stormy relationship" although "there’s barely any hint of despair in the delivery given its catchy refrain and spirited set-up."

== Personnel ==
- Jackson Browne – vocals, acoustic guitar
- Rosemary Butler, Doug Haywood – background vocals
- Craig Doerge – piano
- Danny Kortchmar – electric guitar
- Russ Kunkel – drums
- David Lindley – slide guitar
- Leland Sklar – bass guitar

== Chart positions ==
Chart (1978)	Peak position
U.S. Billboard Bubbling Under Hot 100	109
