= Hold On Hold Out =

1980 single by Jackson Browne

- 12-inch single picture sleeve

Single by Jackson Browne

from the album Hold Out
- B-side: "Hold Out"
- Released: December 1980
- Recorded: Autumn 1979 – Spring 1980
- Genre: Rock
- Length: 8:08
- Label: Asylum
- Songwriters: Jackson Browne, Craig Doerge
- Producers: Jackson Browne, Greg Ladanyi

Jackson Browne singles chronology
"That Girl Could Sing" (1980)	"Hold On Hold Out" (1980)	"Somebody's Baby" (1982)

"Hold On Hold Out" is a song written by Jackson Browne and Craig Doerge and performed by American singer-songwriter Jackson Browne. It is from his 1980 album Hold Out. It was released as the third single from the album, but due to its slightly over-eight-minute length, it was released as a "specially priced" 12-inch 45 rpm record (Asylum 11477) instead of the traditional 7-inch 45, Asylum records possibly hoping to repeat the 12-inch airplay success of "The Load-Out/Stay" medley from the previous album. However, "Hold On Hold Out" only reached number 103 on the Billboard Bubbling Under Hot 100 chart.

== History ==
On the back of the album cover the dedication reads "THIS IS FOR LYNNE." Lynne Sweeney later became Jackson Browne's second wife.

== Reception ==
As a possibly logically extreme conclusion to the singer/songwriter confessional trend begun in the early 1970s, critics emphasized this song particularly in their reviews for the album. In the Sept. 4, 1980 issue of Rolling Stone, Kit Rachlis began his review of the album by drawing attention to the song: "Everything that's right and everything that's wrong about Hold Out ... can be found in its climax: the spoken confession at the end of the last cut... Eight minutes long, "Hold On Hold Out" is the LP's anthem, its farewell address and would-be summation. With Technicolor clarity, the drive of the drums, the zing of the string synthesizer and the shoulders-thrust-back momentum of the piano jump out at you — big and bright and basic. So the drama is real when the instruments drop back and Browne stops singing and starts speaking. It's a measure of both the grandiosity and simplicity of Browne's intentions that this album comes down to his saying — without the aid of melody or harmony — "I love you." And it's a measure of Hold Out's failure that these words sound flat, forced, even selfish: a meaningful private act made embarrassing by its public expression. Also, the words are a letdown, since they follow the funniest, most heartbreakingly romantic line on the record."

Charlie Ricci at Bloggerhythms said in 2011 that the song's "centerpiece was an almost schmaltzy spoken passage in the middle that was very much not the kind of thing Browne normally put on vinyl."

William Ruhlmann at Allmusic said that "'Hold on Hold Out,' the traditional big, long, last song on the album, was awkwardly, not winningly, intimate." Classic Rock History critic Brian Kachejian rated it as Browne's 4th greatest song, saying that "the beautiful piano introduction and spoken word middle section highlight one of Jackson Browne’s most romantic songs".

== Chart positions ==
Chart (1981)	Peak position
U.S. Billboard Bubbling Under Hot 100	103
