= Running on Empty (album) =

1977 live album / studio album by Jackson Browne

Live album / Studio album by Jackson Browne
- Released: December 6, 1977
- Recorded: August 17 – September 17, 1977
- Genre: Rock
- Length: 41:49
- Label: Asylum
- Producer: Jackson Browne

Jackson Browne chronology
The Pretender (1976)	Running on Empty (1977)	Hold Out (1980)

Singles from Running on Empty
- 1. "Running on Empty" Released: January 1978; 2. "The Load-Out"/"Stay" Released: May 1978; 3. "You Love the Thunder" Released: 1978

Running on Empty is the fifth album by American singer-songwriter Jackson Browne. Featuring songs themed around life on the road, the entire album was recorded on tour, either live on stage, or in locations associated with touring, such as backstage, on tour buses, or in hotel rooms. Released in 1977, the album reached No. 3 on the Billboard Pop Albums chart in 1978 and stayed on the charts for 65 weeks. The single for the title track, "Running on Empty", peaked at No. 11 and the follow-up single, "The Load-Out"/"Stay", reached No. 20 on the Billboard Pop Singles chart.

The album received two Grammy Award nominations in 1979: one for Album of the Year and the other for Pop Male Vocal Performance for the song "Running on Empty".

== History ==
In addition to tracks recorded on-stage during concerts, it contains songs recorded in hotel rooms, on the tour bus, and backstage. It is unusual among live albums in that none of the tracks had ever appeared on a previous studio album. Browne was the sole writer on only two songs, co-writing four others and covering another four. The theme of the album was life on the road. In a Rolling Stone interview about the tour during which the album was recorded, Browne expressed pleasure at finally being able to afford the session musicians he wanted to go out on the road with him.

The album was certified as a Gold record in 1977 and Platinum in 1978 by the RIAA. It reached multi-platinum in 1997 and 2001. It reached 7× platinum and is Browne's best-selling album to date. In popular culture, the album cover can be seen framed and hanging on the wall next to the front door in the apartment on the set of Mork & Mindy.

== Reception ==
Professional ratings
Review scores
Source	Rating
AllMusic	4.5/5 stars
Blender	4/5 stars
Christgau's Record Guide	B+
The Encyclopedia of Popular Music	3/5 stars

The original Rolling Stone review in 1978 by music critic Paul Nelson praised the album, writing "What I really like about Running on Empty probably has little to do with the generosity or genius of its dual concepts, with the songwriter's craftmanship skill, with how much I admire the music of David Lindley and the Section, but rather with Jackson Browne himself. In other words, as impressed as I am with Jackson Browne's art, I'm even more impressed with the humanity that shines through it. Maybe they're inseparable, but I doubt it."

In his retrospective review for AllMusic, William Ruhlmann called the album "Browne's least ambitious, but perhaps most accessible, album ironically became his biggest seller. But it is not characteristic of his other work: for many, it will be the only Browne album they will want to own, just as others always will regard it disdainfully as 'Jackson Browne lite'."

Music critic Robert Christgau gave the album a B+ grade: "Jackson sounds relaxed verbally, vocally, even instrumentally... I consider this his most attractive album. But his devotees may consider the self-effacement a deprivation." Blender gave the 2005 reissue a 4 of 5 star rating, stating it "cuts deeper than most road sagas partly because Browne had the brilliant notion of recording on the fly... It also works because he tapped the culture's circa-1977 sense that it was running on empty, feeling like a trashed Holiday Inn room—Empty is about something larger than the misery of room service."

Bill Shapiro called the album "Audio verité—one of the most conceptually fascinating recordings in the history of rock & roll." In 2004, in The 100 Best-Selling Albums of the 70's, Hamish Camp wrote: "Entering somewhat of a creative lull following some sterling albums... Running On Empty was regarded by many as lacking ambition but was nevertheless Browne's most commercially successful of his career to date, peaking at Number Three in the US and reaching Number 28 in the UK." At that time, it was the twenty-third best-selling album of the 1970s. In the UK, "Stay" became his only major hit single, reaching No. 12.

== Reissues ==
Running on Empty has been reissued numerous times on CD. On November 15, 2005, Elektra/Rhino issued a remastered version with the following additional tracks: 11. "Cocaine Again" and 12. "Edwardsville Room 124" on Disc 2 of the package, which is a DVD Audio version of the album's track lineup that features a 5.1 surround sound mix, among other bonus items, such as video montages and lyrics. Disc 1 is a remaster of the original album's song list only. The remaster is missing the first 25 seconds of audience ambience that, on all other previous editions of the album, led into the beginning of the album's title track. For reasons unknown, this snippet, which included the sounds of the musicians' count into the song's opening, was edited out on this version, though the Disc 2 DVD-Audio version includes the 25 seconds missing on Disc 1.

== Track listing ==
Side one

1. "Running on Empty" (Jackson Browne) – 5:20
  - Recorded live (8/27/77), Merriweather Post Pavilion, Columbia, Maryland
2. "The Road" (Danny O'Keefe) – 4:50
  - Recorded in room 301 (8/27/77), Cross Keys Inn, Columbia, MD (first — 2:58) and live (9/7/77), Garden State Arts Center, Holmdel, New Jersey
3. "Rosie" (Browne, Donald Miller) – 3:37
  - Recorded backstage (9/1/77) "in the big rehearsal room", Saratoga Performing Arts Center, Saratoga Springs, New York
  - Doug Haywood and tour photographer Joel Bernstein sing harmony.
4. "You Love the Thunder" (Browne) – 3:52
  - Recorded live (9/6/77), Garden State Arts Center, Holmdel, New Jersey [one U.S. cassette release typos this as "Holmdale"]
5. "Cocaine" (Reverend Gary Davis, additional lyrics by Browne and Glenn Frey) – 4:55
  - Recorded in room 124 (8/17/77), Holiday Inn, Edwardsville, Illinois

Side two

1. "Shaky Town" (Danny Kortchmar) – 3:36
  - Recorded in room 124 (8/18/77), Holiday Inn, Edwardsville, Illinois
  - Danny Kortchmar sings harmony.
2. "Love Needs a Heart" (Browne, Valerie Carter, Lowell George) – 3:28
  - Recorded live (9/17/77), Universal City, California
3. "Nothing but Time" (Browne, Howard Burke) – 3:05
  - Recorded "on a bus (a Continental Silver Eagle) somewhere in New Jersey" (9/8/77)
  - Russ Kunkel is credited as playing "snare, hi-hat, and cardboard box with foot pedal." The song was recorded aboard the band's Continental Silver Eagle tour bus (hence the lyrical reference to "Silver Eagle") while en route from Portland, Maine to their next gig in New Jersey. The bus's engine is audible in the background throughout, and its downshift and acceleration can be plainly heard during the bridge.
4. "The Load-Out" (Browne, Bryan Garofalo) – 5:38
  - Recorded live (8/27/77), Merriweather Post Pavilion, Columbia, Maryland
5. "Stay" (Maurice Williams) – 3:28
  - Recorded live (8/27/77), Merriweather Post Pavilion, Columbia, Maryland
  - Rosemary Butler and David Lindley share lead vocals with Browne.

== Personnel ==
- Jackson Browne – vocals, guitar, acoustic piano
- David Lindley – lap steel guitar, fiddle, co-lead vocal (on "Stay")
- Danny Kortchmar – lead guitar, harmony vocals (on "Shaky Town")
- Craig Doerge – acoustic piano, Fender Rhodes, Minimoog, Oberheim synthesizer, string synthesizer, Hammond organ
- Leland Sklar – bass guitar
- Russ Kunkel – drums, snare drum, cardboard box, hi-hat
- Rosemary Butler – background vocals, co-lead vocal (on "Stay")
- Joel Bernstein – background vocals (on "Rosie")
- Doug Haywood – background vocals

== Tour staff ==
- Howard Burke – tour manager
- Donald "Buddah" Miller – production manager
- Jan Michael Alejandro – drum technician
- Eric Deterding – stage technician
- Michael Deterding – stage technician
- Bill Thompson – technician
- Edd Kolakowski – Steinway piano and keyboards technician
- Dave Hassingar – technician
- Jim Nipar – technician
- Chris Cabral – technical advisor
- Alan Owen, Kevin Di Piazza and Jim Waits – lighting crew
- Jim Bornhorst – house PA mixer
- Bill "Doc" Gans – monitor engineer
- Rance Caldwell – monitor engineer
- Peter Golden – booking coordination
- Thomas Gustaferro – bus driver
- Jimmy Deluca, Bryan Lisenbee and Mike Rogers – truck drivers

== Production ==
- Producer – Jackson Browne
- Engineer – Greg Ladanyi
- Recording in hotel and bus on Record Plant NY Remote Truck.
- Assistant Engineers – David Hewitt, Norman Mershon and Mark Salwasser (bus and hotel recordings); Russell Schmitt and Tom Walsh (stage recordings).
- Mix Assistants – Dennis Kirk and George Ybarra
- Mixed at The Sound Factory (Hollywood, CA).
- Mastered by Bernie Grundman at A&M Studios (Hollywood, CA).
- Art Direction and Design – Jimmy Wachtel
- Photography – Joel Bernstein (tour) and Aaron Rapoport (other).

== Charts ==
=== Weekly charts ===
Chart (1978)	Peak position
Australia (Kent Music Report)	8
Canada Top Albums/CDs (RPM)	5
Dutch Albums (Album Top 100)	24
New Zealand Albums (RMNZ)	15
UK Albums (Official Charts)	28
US Billboard 200	3

=== Year-end charts ===
Chart (1978)	Position
Canada Top Albums/CDs (RPM)	24
US Billboard 200	11

Singles

Year	Single	Chart	Position
1978	"Running on Empty"	Billboard Pop Singles	11
1978	"Stay/The Load-Out"	Billboard Pop Singles	20
1978	"You Love the Thunder"	Billboard Bubbling Under Hot 100	109

== Certifications ==
Region	Certification	Certified units/sales
Australia (ARIA)	3× Platinum	210,000^{^}
Canada (Music Canada)	Platinum	100,000^{^}
Germany (BVMI)	Gold	250,000^{^}
Spain (Promusicae)	Gold	50,000^{^}
United Kingdom (BPI)	Gold	100,000^{^}
United States (RIAA)	7× Platinum	7,000,000^{^}
^{^} Shipments figures based on certification alone.
