= That Girl Could Sing =

1980 single by Jackson Browne

- Japanese cover

Single by Jackson Browne

from the album Hold Out
- B-side: "Of Missing Persons"
- Released: September 1980
- Recorded: Autumn 1979–spring 1980
- Genre: Rock, pop
- Length: 4:34
- Label: Asylum
- Songwriter: Jackson Browne
- Producers: Jackson Browne & Greg Ladanyi

Jackson Browne singles chronology
"Boulevard" (1980)	"That Girl Could Sing" (1980)	"Hold On Hold Out" (1980)

"That Girl Could Sing" is a hit single written and performed by Jackson Browne from his 1980 album Hold Out. The song peaked at #22 on the Billboard Hot 100, charting for 13 weeks after its Sept. 20, 1980 debut. It was also released as a single in Japan. "That Girl Could Sing" was the seventh-biggest hit single of Browne's Top 40 career (beating 1976's "Here Come Those Tears Again" by one position higher on the Billboard Hot 100).

== History ==
Lyrically, the song expresses positive remembrance of a relationship with an ultimately elusive woman:

"She was a friend to me when I needed one —
"Wasn't for her I don't know what I'd have done.
"She gave me back something that was missing in me.
"She could have turned out to be almost anyone ...
"With the possible exception
"Of who I wanted her to be ...

That last sentence of that first verse was praised by Kit Rachlis in his September 1980 review of the album, but he bemoaned "Talk about celestial bodies/And your angels on the wing." The full title of the song is only sung by Browne once in the song, who then ends the song with a variation on it:

"She wasn't much good at saying goodbye — but,
"That girl was sane.

Billboard writes that the song starts "with a haunting instrumental before his perceptive lyrics and vocals take charge" and that the melody builds in intensity over the course of the song. Record World called it a "prime example" of how "Browne's ballad-into-rocker arrangements are endearing as they are distinctive."

"That Girl Could Sing" was long speculated to be about either singer-songwriter Laura Nyro, whom Browne dated in the early 1970s, or his friend and former touring companion Linda Ronstadt, but was considered to have been inspired by sometime-Browne backup singer Valerie Carter. Fan website editor Russ Paris stated on his site that he believed that "most fans seem to consider Carter the inspiration for the song" with Browne giving a couple hints through the years". After announcing Carter's death during a concert on March 4, 2017 at the Maui Arts & Cultural Center in Kahului, Hawaii, Browne played the song in tribute to her. Finally, on April 22, 2017, he formally acknowledged Carter as the subject of the song at the Burton Cummings Theatre in Winnipeg, Canada, stating: "It's a song I wrote about her, there was a time that I was just crazy about her."

Musically, the song is dominated by David Lindley's lap steel guitar and Craig Doerge's keyboards, and Rick Marotta guests on the song to add high-hat and toms, according to the album liner notes. Fans recall Lindley quoted in the April 1982 issue of Guitar Player magazine as saying that, playing a Rickenbacker lap steel, he was using a broken Fairchild limiter amplifier "on its last legs." In addition, producer Greg Ladanyi has been quoted as noting that "the guitar sound on the track 'That Girl Could Sing' required minimal processing, and the tone of the record is pretty true to what came out of Lindley's amp."

== Chart positions ==
Chart (1980)	Peak position
US Billboard Hot 100	22
Canada (RPM) Top Singles	61
