= Hold Out =

Studio album by Jackson Browne
- Released: June 24, 1980
- Recorded: Autumn 1979 – Spring 1980
- Studios: The Sound Factory (Hollywood, California); Record One (Los Angeles, California)
- Genre: Rock
- Length: 37:48
- Label: Asylum
- Producers: Jackson Browne; Greg Ladanyi

Jackson Browne chronology
Running on Empty (1977)	Hold Out (1980)	Lawyers in Love (1983)

Singles from Hold Out
- 1. "Boulevard" Released: June 1980; 2. "That Girl Could Sing" Released: September 1980; 3. "Hold On Hold Out" Released: December 1980

Hold Out is the sixth album by American singer-songwriter Jackson Browne, released in 1980. Although critically the album has not been as well-received as other Browne recordings, it remains his only album to date to reach number 1 on the Billboard chart.

== History ==
The song "Of Missing Persons" was written for Inara George, the daughter of Lowell George (formerly of the band Little Feat), a songwriting collaborator and longtime friend of Browne's who died a year prior to the release of Hold Out. The phrase "of missing persons" was derived from a line in a Little Feat song, "Long Distance Love".

The album was certified as a Gold and Platinum record in 1980 by the RIAA. It reached Multi-platinum in 2001.

== Reception ==
Professional ratings
Review scores
Source	Rating
AllMusic	2/5 stars
Robert Christgau	C+
The Encyclopedia of Popular Music	2/5 stars

Writing retrospectively for AllMusic, music critic William Rulhmann called some of the tracks awkward or foolish. He compared the album with earlier releases: "If Browne was still trying to write himself out of the cul-de-sac he had created for himself early on, Hold Out represented an earnest attempt that nevertheless fell short." Similarly, critic Robert Christgau wrote: "Never hep to his jive, I'm less than shocked by the generalized sentimentality disillusioned admirers descry within these hallowed tracks, though the one about the late great Lowell George... is unusually rank." The New York Times deemed Hold Out "a fine record; perhaps his finest, overall... It confirms his growth as an artist."

== Track listing ==
All tracks are written by Jackson Browne except where noted.

Side one

1. "Disco Apocalypse" – 5:08
2. "Hold Out" – 5:37
3. "That Girl Could Sing" – 4:34
4. "Boulevard" – 3:15

Side two

1. "Of Missing Persons" – 6:31
2. "Call It a Loan" (Browne, David Lindley) – 4:35
3. "Hold On Hold Out" (Browne, Craig Doerge) – 8:08

== Personnel ==
- Jackson Browne – lead vocals, acoustic piano, electric guitars
- Craig Doerge – Fender Rhodes, Hammond organ, string synthesizer, Wurlitzer electric piano (3), acoustic piano (7)
- Bill Payne – Hammond organ (1, 2, 5–7), string synthesizer (7)
- David Lindley – electric guitars, lap steel guitar
- Bob Glaub – bass guitar
- Russ Kunkel – drums (1–3, 5–7)
- Rick Marotta – hi-hat (3), tom toms (3), drums (4)
- Joe Lala – percussion (1)
- Danny Kortchmar – maracas (4)
- Rosemary Butler – backing vocals
- Doug Haywood – backing vocals

== Production ==
- Producers – Jackson Browne and Greg Ladanyi
- Engineer – Greg Ladanyi
- Assistant engineers – Brent Averill, Niko Bolas, James Ledner, Jim Nipar, Sergio Reyes, Karen Siegal and George Ybarra.
- Mixed by Buford Jones
- Mastered by Doug Sax at The Mastering Lab (Hollywood, California).
- Production assistance – Rusty Conway and Donald Miller
- Album cover – Dawn Patrol
- Design and photography – Jimmy Wachtel

== Charts ==
=== Weekly charts ===
Chart (1980)	Peak position
Australia (Kent Music Report)	6
Canada Top Albums/CDs (RPM)	6
Dutch Albums (Album Top 100)	25
New Zealand Albums (RMNZ)	15
Norwegian Albums (VG-lista)	10
Swedish Albums (Sverigetopplistan)	12
UK Albums (Official Charts)	44
US Billboard 200	1

=== Year-end charts ===
Chart (1980)	Position
Canada Top Albums/CDs (RPM)	36

Singles – Billboard (United States)

Year	Single	Chart	Position
1980	"Boulevard"	Pop Singles	19
1980	"That Girl Could Sing"	Pop Singles	22
