= The Pretender (Jackson Browne song) =

- Spanish Picture Sleeve

Single by Jackson Browne

from the album The Pretender
- B-side: "Daddy's Tune"
- Released: May 14, 1977
- Recorded: 1975 – early 1976
- Genre: Soft rock
- Length: 5:52
- Label: Asylum/Elektra
- Songwriter: Jackson Browne
- Producer: Jon Landau

Jackson Browne singles chronology
"Here Come Those Tears Again" (1976)	"The Pretender" (1977)	"Running on Empty" (1978)

"The Pretender" is a song written and performed by American rock performer Jackson Browne and featured on his 1976 album The Pretender.

== History ==
"The Pretender" was composed, according to Browne, in a number of locations; in Los Angeles, within a rented store-front in North Hollywood, and in a "tacky" hotel in Hawaii. Browne is quoted to have claimed that the song was almost complete before he had discovered the defining opening piano-riff.

In answering the question of who The Pretender is, Browne said, "it's not me exactly, although sometimes people applaud for me at that moment in the song as if I am, but in truth there is a bit of The Pretender in me, but it's anybody that's sort of lost sight of some of their dreams...and is going through the motions and trying to make a stab at a certain way of life that he sees other people succeeding at. So maybe it's a lot of people of a certain generation who sort of embraced a very material lifestyle in place of dreams that they had that sort of disintegrated at some point."

Piano is in the forefront, played by Craig Doerge. Drums are played by Jeff Porcaro, bass by Bob Glaub, acoustic guitar and electric guitar are played by Fred Tackett, harmony vocals performed by David Crosby and Graham Nash and the string section was arranged by David Campbell.

"The Pretender" was only a minor hit single, reaching No. 58 on the Billboard Hot 100, spending 5 weeks on the chart in 1977. However, it gained substantial progressive rock radio and album-oriented rock airplay, and has since become a staple on many classic rock formats.

It was featured in the 1995 film Mr. Holland's Opus.

== Critical analysis ==
Will Hodgkinson of The Times described the song as a Seventies soft-rock favourite. Billboard described the song as having "a richly complex lyric and a sweeping melodic structure." Cash Box said that it had "strong images and emotive musicianship." Record World said that "The artistry is unquestioned, the feeling a breakthrough for Browne."

William Ruhlmann calls the song "a cynical, sarcastic treatise on moneygrubbing and the shallow life of the suburbs," saying that it was "primarily inner-directed," and that "the song's defeatist tone demands rejection, but it is also a quintessential statement of its time, the post-Watergate '70s; dire as that might be, you had to admire that kind of honesty, even as it made you wince." Far Out critic Tom Taylor rated it as the No. 81 most underrated song of the 1970s, calling it "an ineffably solid piece of songwriting, that shows off his ability to entwine melody and lyrics like he's simply tying together his shoe laces."

Writing about the songs in the context of its placing as the finale on the album of the same title, Author Peter Ames Carlin noted in 2010 that "tellingly, this is the first JB album to not flirt with holy transcendence in its final grooves." He describes the song as "a tart portrait of society, but unlike, say, Billy Joel (whose simple folk are so often reduced to Davy-in-the-Navy caricatures) JB sees himself right in the middle of the crowd. 'We'll fill in the missing colors in each others' paint-by-numbers dreams,' he pledges." Compared to the "sweet, sticky erotica" one might recall Browne singing with Bonnie Raitt on 1973's "The Times You've Come," Carlin says "this ain't it. Not even close:"

We're gonna put our dark glasses on
And we'll make love until our strength is gone,
And when the morning light comes streaming in
We'll get up and do it again. Amen.

"The life of an idiot, perhaps. But certainly not a happy one," writes Carlin.

Ultimate Classic Rock critic Michael Gallucci rated it as Browne's 4th greatest song, calling it "a nearly six-minute breakdown of one man's occasionally harsh, and almost always dishonest, survival instincts" as "'60s idealism had finally given way to mid-'70s cynicism." Gallucci also rated it as the 16th greatest soft rock song. Classic Rock History critic Brian Kachejian rated it as Browne's greatest song, calling it "Jackson Browne's masterpiece" and saying that "it's hard to find words to describe the song's beauty and its impact on the singer-songwriter genre."

== Cover version ==
Lucinda Williams performed it on the Jackson Browne tribute album Looking into You: A Tribute to Jackson Browne.

== Chart positions ==
Weekly chart performance for "The Pretender"
Chart (1977)	Peak position
US Billboard Hot 100	58
US Cash Box Top 100	58
US Record World Singles	76
