= The Load-Out =

- Side-B label of the 1978 commercial single "Stay"

Single by Jackson Browne

from the album Running on Empty
- A-side: "Stay"
- Released: May 19, 1978
- Recorded: August 27, 1977
- Venue: Merriweather Post Pavilion, Columbia, Maryland
- Length: 5:38 (album version); 9:06 (DJ promo version in medley with "Stay")
- Label: Asylum/Elektra
- Songwriters: Jackson Browne; Bryan Garofalo
- Producer: Jackson Browne

"The Load-Out" is a song co-written and performed live by Jackson Browne from his 1977 album Running on Empty. It is a tribute to his roadies and fans. The song was recorded live at Merriweather Post Pavilion in Columbia, Maryland, on August 27, 1977, as part of the tour in support of the album The Pretender.

== History ==
"The Load-Out" describes the daily practices of a band and its road crew on a concert tour, and the emotions evoked throughout such an endeavor. The first three verses of the song consist of Browne singing and playing piano with David Lindley playing lap steel guitar. They are later joined by a synthesizer, followed by the rest of the band. Eventually "The Load-Out" segues into an interpretation of Maurice Williams' 1960 hit "Stay", sung by Browne, Rosemary Butler, and Lindley. Lindley sings the falsetto in the second chorus (Rosemary Butler sings in the first).

Ultimate Classic Rock critic Bryan Rolli wrote that "The Load-Out" is "a loving tribute to the touring industry's unsung heroes: the crew members who set up and tear down the stage every night, hustling in silence and solitude to ensure the artists are ready for their moment of glory," and that the transition to "Stay" reminds the crew that their work is not in vain.

Many radio stations played "The Load-Out" and "Stay" together as a medley and, although it was not released as a single to the public initially ("Rosie" was the original B-side to "Stay"), "The Load-Out" charted as a tag-along to "Stay" on the Billboard Hot 100 singles charts, based on airplay. "Stay" debuted on the Hot 100 on June 10, 1978, as a sole A-side, but was listed along with "The Load-Out" on the chart beginning with the August 5, 1978, chart for eight weeks, both showing a peak at No. 20. "Stay" stayed on the Hot 100 for a total of fifteen weeks.

When performing "The Load-Out"/"Stay" at the Universal Amphitheatre, during "Stay," Jackson had the roadies carting off all the equipment until he was left with only the Grand Piano, to finish the song.

== Personnel ==
- Jackson Browne – lead vocals, piano
- Danny Kortchmar – guitar
- David Lindley – co-lead vocals on "Stay", lap steel guitar
- Craig Doerge – Hammond organ on "Stay", Fender Rhodes piano, synthesizer
- Leland Sklar – bass guitar
- Russ Kunkel – drums
- Rosemary Butler – co-lead vocals on "Stay"
- Doug Haywood – background vocals on "Stay"

== Reception ==
In his March 9, 1978, Rolling Stone review of the Running on Empty album, Paul Nelson discussed the song in the context of the album's "consciously created documentary," and reviewed the song's significance placed as its finale. The "Load-Out/Stay" medley, he claimed, was "worthy of such earlier" Browne album-closing "anthems as 'For Everyman,' 'Before the Deluge' and 'The Pretender.' 'The Load-Out' is Jackson Browne's tribute to and summation of every aspect of live performance: the cheering audience out front, the band playing hard-nosed rock & roll, the backstage crew loading up the trucks—and, always, the road to the next town. Packed to capacity with the data of first-rate reporting and with music so warm and soaring it belies the album's title, this song flows triumphantly into 'Stay,' where Browne tells us he doesn't ever want it to end."

Ultimate Classic Rock critic Michael Gallucci rated the medley of "The Load-Out" and "Stay" as Browne's fifth greatest song, saying that "The Load-Out" "runs down the daily monotony of tour life". Classic Rock History critic Brian Kachejian rated the medley as Browne's 8th greatest song. In 2024 Ultimate Classic Rock critic Allison Rapp rated "The Load-Out" to be rock music's 2nd best work song.

In an essay for the 2005 Rhino Records reissue of the album, critic Anthony DeCurtis wrote that one of the major themes of the album is how "the joy of performing before an audience lends a purpose to everything that happens — the good and the bad — behind the scene." That theme, he wrote, is expressed "eloquently in the easy rolling transition from the wistful regret of 'The Load-Out' to the smile-inducing high jinks of 'Stay.'"

In 1981, Austrian singer-songwriter Georg Danzer recorded a German cover version of this song titled "Roadie-Lied".

The final episode of the 2016 television series Roadies was named after the song, and featured a live performance of it by Browne.

== Chart positions ==
Chart (1978)	Peak position
U.S. Billboard Hot 100	20
