= Stay (Maurice Williams song) =

1960 single by Maurice Williams and the Zodiacs

- Side A variant of the original US single

Single by Maurice Williams and the Zodiacs

from the album Stay
- B-side: "Do You Believe"
- Written: 1953
- Released: August 23, 1960
- Recorded: 1960
- Genre: Doo-wop
- Length: 1:36
- Label: Herald
- Songwriter: Maurice Williams
- Producer: Phil Gernhard

Maurice Williams and the Zodiacs singles chronology
"Lover (Where Are You)" (1959)	"Stay" (1960)	"I Remember" (1960)

Audio sample
- file; help

"Stay" is a doo-wop song written by Maurice Williams, first recorded in 1960 by Williams with his group the Zodiacs. Commercially successful versions were later also issued by the Hollies, the Four Seasons and Jackson Browne.

== Maurice Williams original version ==
The song was written by Williams in 1953 when he was 15 years old. He had been trying to convince his date not to go home at 10 o'clock as she was supposed to. He lost the argument. However, as Williams was to relate years later, "Like a flood, the words just came to me."

In 1960, the song was put on a demo by Williams and his band, the Zodiacs, but it attracted no interest until an eight-year-old heard it and impressed the band members with her positive reaction to the tune. The band's producer, Phil Gernhard, took it along with some other demos to New York City and played them for all the major record producers that they could access. Finally, Al Silver of Herald Records became interested, but insisted that the song be re-recorded as the demo's recording levels were too low. They also said that one line, "Let's have another smoke" would have to be removed in order for the song to be played on commercial radio. After the group recorded the tune again, it was released by Herald Records and was picked up by CKLW radio. It entered the U.S. Billboard Hot 100 on October 3, 1960, and reached the number one spot on November 21, 1960. It was dislodged a week later by Elvis Presley's "Are You Lonesome Tonight?". On the Herald recording, Williams sang lead and Henry Gaston sang the falsetto chorus.

The original recording of "Stay" was the shortest single ever to reach the top of the American record charts at that time, at 1 minute 36 seconds.

By 1990, it had sold more than 8 million copies. Its popularity revived when the Dirty Dancing soundtrack included it.

== Chart history ==
=== Weekly charts ===
Maurice Williams & the Zodiacs

Chart (1960–1961)	Peak position
Canada (CHUM Chart)	9
New Zealand (Lever Hit Parade)	4
UK	14
U.S. Billboard Hot 100	1
U.S. Billboard R&B	3
U.S. Cash Box Top 100	4

=== Year-end charts ===
Chart (1960)	Rank
U.S. (Joel Whitburn's Pop Annual)	18
U.S. Billboard Hot 100	98

== The Hollies version ==
"Stay"
- Side A of the original UK single

Single by the Hollies

from the album Stay with the Hollies
- B-side: "Now's The Time"
- Released: November 15, 1963
- Recorded: 1963
- Studio: EMI, London
- Genre: Pop rock
- Length: 2:13
- Label: Parlophone
- Songwriter: Maurice Williams
- Producer: Ron Richards

The Hollies singles chronology
"Searchin'" (1963)	"Stay" (1963)	"Just One Look" (1964)

In November 1963, the song was covered by British band the Hollies and released as a single. Their version reached No. 8 on the UK Singles Chart and remained on the chart for a total of 16 weeks. The song serves as the title track of their debut album Stay with the Hollies. The Hollies' recording also reached No. 20 in Sweden. The Hollies' version has also been featured in various of the band's compilation albums, including Hollies' Greatest (1968), 20 Golden Greats (1978) and Clarke, Hicks & Nash Years (2011).

=== Charts ===
Chart (1963)	Peak position
UK Singles (OCC)	8
Sweden (Sverigetopplistan)	20

== The Four Seasons version ==
"Stay"
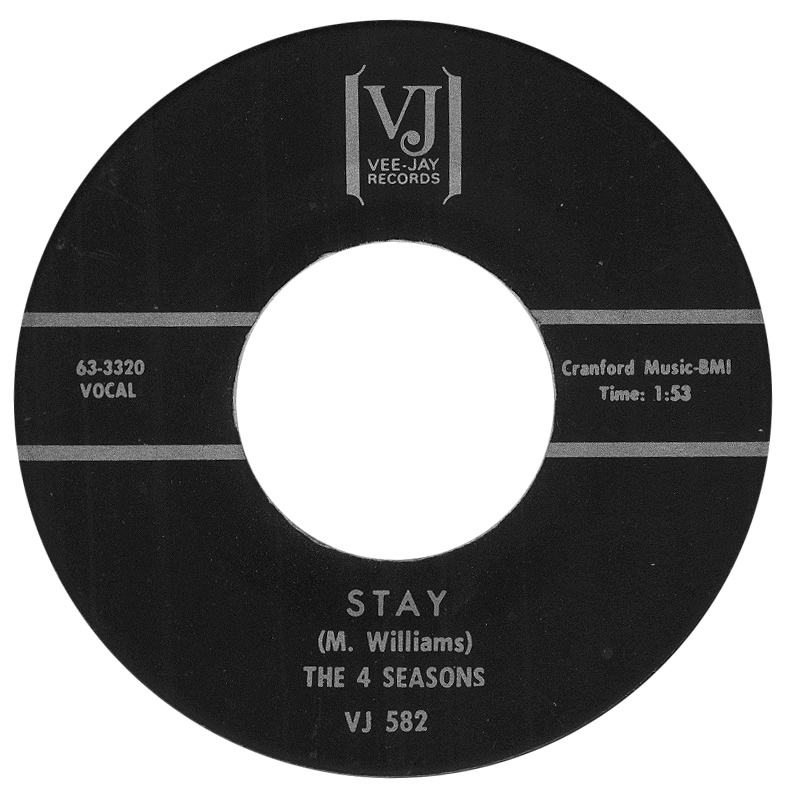
- Side A variant of the 1964 US single

Single by the Four Seasons

from the album The 4 Seasons Sing Ain't That a Shame and 11 Others
- A-side: "Peanuts" (first release)
- B-side: "Goodnight My Love" (from the album Big Girls Don't Cry and 12 Others) (second release)
- Released: December 1963
- Recorded: 1963
- Genre: Rock, doo-wop
- Length: 1:53
- Label: Vee-Jay
- Songwriter: Maurice Williams
- Producer: Bob Crewe

The Four Seasons singles chronology
"Dawn (Go Away)" (1963)	"Stay" (1963)	"Ronnie" (1964)

The Four Seasons' version was first released on their June 1963 album The 4 Seasons Sing Ain't That a Shame and 11 Others; it was later released as a single in December 1963. Vee Jay originally released it as the B-side of "Peanuts" in December, but when disc jockeys started to "turn the single over" to play "Stay" on the air, the record company superseded the single with a new one with "Stay" as the A-side and "Goodnight My Love" as the new B-side. It peaked at number 16 on the US Billboard Hot 100 in April 1964. In Canada it reached number 12.

== Jackson Browne version ==
"Stay"

Single by Jackson Browne

from the album Running on Empty
- B-side: "Rosie"
- Released: May 19, 1978
- Recorded: August 27, 1977
- Venue: Merriweather Post Pavilion, Columbia, Maryland
- Genre: Soft rock
- Length: 3:28
- Label: Asylum
- Songwriter: Maurice Williams
- Producer: Jackson Browne

Jackson Browne singles chronology
"Running on Empty" (1978)	"Stay" (1978)	"You Love the Thunder" (1978)

A version of the song with revised lyrics is the last track on Jackson Browne's 1977 album Running on Empty. The song, which follows on the heels of Browne's "The Load-Out" begs the audience to stay for an encore and includes an extensive playout. It includes backing contributions from David Lindley and Rosemary Butler. Billboard described this version as "spirited and gospel-like". Cash Box said that it has "effective guitar and keyboard solos and an easy beat" and "pleasing lead vocals", and that "David Lindley draws appreciation from the audience with his teasing falsetto". Record World said that "David Lindley's falsetto vocals and guitar lend an able hand, and the live quality is appealing."

Browne, Butler and Lindley each contribute a similar verse in turn in ascending vocal ranges. It was released as a single and reached number 20 in the U.S. as well as number 12 in the UK.

=== Charts ===
Chart (1978)	Peak position
Australia (Kent Music Report)	58
Canada RPM Top Singles	19
New Zealand (RIANZ)	10
UK Singles (OCC)	12
US Billboard Hot 100	20
US Billboard Adult Contemporary	47
US Cash Box Top 100	22

== Other notable versions ==
- Bruce Springsteen & the E Street Band recorded a version with Browne, Tom Petty and Rosemary Butler for the No Nukes album in September 1979.
- British reggae fusion pop/dance trio Dreamhouse released a version of "Stay" as their debut single in 1995, which was a minor hit, reaching No. 62 on the UK Singles Chart. In the United States, it was released in 1998 as the lead single from the band's U.S. self-titled album. In a positive review for the June 13, 1998 issue of Billboard magazine, the song was featured in the "New & Noteworthy" section, saying "This wildly appealing working-class UK trio is poised to seriously penetrate the stateside market with an instantly infectious dance rendition of Maurice Williams' pop chestnut... Pop music doesn't get much more obvious than this single, which is destined to become the guilty top 40 pleasure of the summer season."

== See also ==
- List of Billboard Hot 100 number-one singles of 1960
