= The Daisy Chain (band) =

American garage rock/psychedelic band

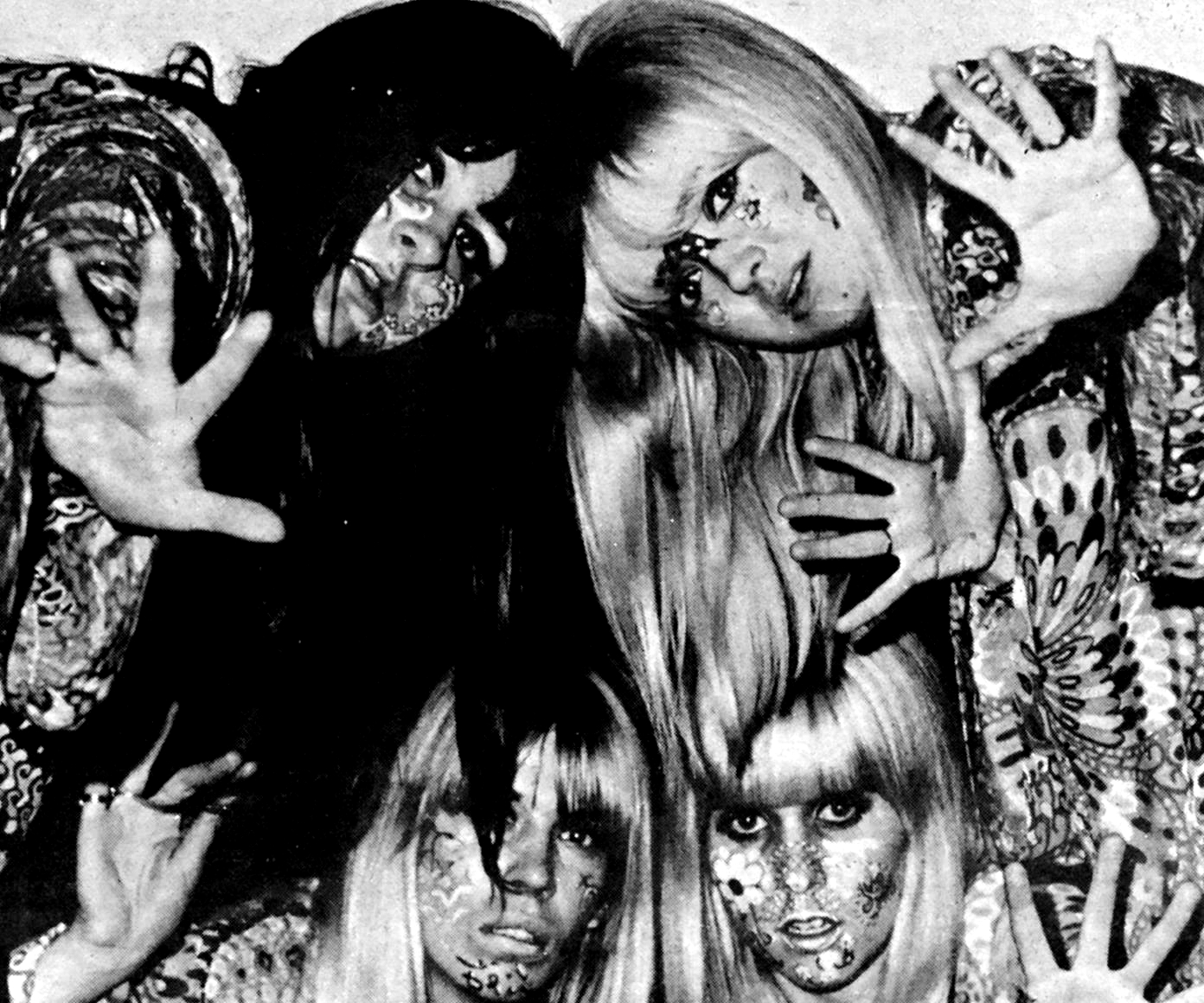
- The Daisy Chain in 1967; clockwise from top left: Michelle Pinizzotto, Rosemary Butler, Dee Dee Lea, and Camille Orosco

Background information
- Origin: Fullerton, California, United States
- Genres: Garage rock; psychedelic
- Years active: 1967–1968
- Label: United International Records
- Spinoffs: Birtha
- Spinoff of: The Ladybirds (1964–1967)
- Past members: Michelle Pinizzotto; Camille Orosco; Rosemary Butler; Dee Dee Lea

The Daisy Chain was an American all-female garage rock and psychedelic band from Fullerton, California who were active in the 1960s. They are remembered for their album Straight or Lame, released on United International Records in 1967.

== Career ==
The Daisy Chain was formed in Fullerton, California. Their lineup consisted of bandleader Michelle "Shele" Pinizzotto (née Tary, later Urquhart) on vocals, Camille Orosco on the organ, Rosemary Butler (née Lane) on bass guitar, and Dee Dee Lea (née Bagby) on drums.

Members of the Daisy Chain, including Butler and Lea, had earlier played in a high school band called the Ladybirds, formed during their attendance at Fullerton Union High School and named after Lady Bird Johnson, who gave the band her blessings in a 1964 press release. Urquhart, while not a formal member of the Ladybirds, helped coach their vocals in the early phases of the band. In late 1964, Ladybirds signed on to Cedwicke Records, a London imprint, cutting a single, "A Girl Without a Boy" backed with "To Know Him Is to Love Him", in the same year. In 1965, they signed on to M.P.I. of the United States, cutting another single, a cover of the Pomus—Shuman song "Sweets for My Sweet" backed with "Why Must I Be Lonely" composed by Ladybirds member Marilisa Read. The Ladybirds found modest success, opening for the Rolling Stones and touring internationally, including to Thailand and Vietnam in 1967.

Between October 1966 and September 1967, Lea and Butler split from the Ladybirds and formed a new band with Urquhart. They initially called themselves the Rapunzels, then Lady Love, before deciding on The Good Lovin' (named after the Young Rascals' 1966 hit cover of "Good Lovin'"). When Orosco joined the group in 1967, the quartet rebranded as the Daisy Chain. This name was coined by Lea and her husband John Hodge, who was also the band's manager. The name reflected their desire to "all be linked together", while also being evocative of the burgeoning psychedelic sounds and "flower power" of the time. In late 1967, they released the album Straight or Lame for the United International label. The band sold over 5,000 copies of the LP within the first three weeks of publication; following this, they embarked on a national tour in early 1968, visiting the Southwest United States, Colorado, and Illinois. They broke up shortly thereafter.

In the aftermath of the breakup, Pinizzotto and Butler formed a new band called Birtha with Olivia Favela and Sherry Hagler. Birtha enjoyed considerably more commercial success, the group signing with a major label, ABC-Dunhill, in the early 1970s and releasing two studio albums and an assortment of singles, before disbanding in 1975.

== Later years ==
In the intervening years since their breakup, the Daisy Chain's work has come to the attention of garage rock and psychedelic enthusiasts. In 2005 Sundazed Music reissued the Straight or Lame album on CD in its original mono mix, but with new liner notes including interviews with former band members. Pinizzotto died on February 4, 2014.

== Discography ==
- Straight or Lame (United International, 1967)
