= Here Come Those Tears Again =

1977 single by Jackson Browne

- German Picture Sleeve

Single by Jackson Browne

from the album The Pretender
- B-side: "Linda Paloma"
- Released: January 1977
- Recorded: 1976
- Genre: Rock
- Length: 3:27
- Label: Asylum Records
- Songwriters: Jackson Browne & Nancy Farnsworth
- Producer: Jon Landau

Jackson Browne singles chronology
"Fountain of Sorrow" (1975)	"Here Come Those Tears Again" (1977)	"The Pretender" (1977)

"Here Come Those Tears Again" is a song co-written and performed by American singer-songwriter Jackson Browne and included on his 1976 album The Pretender. Released as a single, it reached #23 one year to the week after the death of Browne's wife, Phyllis Major, spending nine weeks on the chart, after entering the Billboard Hot 100 on February 5, 1977, at position #64, the highest debut of the week. It also reached #15 on the Billboard Adult Contemporary chart. The single was the eighth-highest charting of his Hot 100 career. It was also released as a single in the United Kingdom, Germany and Japan.

== History ==
The song was credited as being co-written with Nancy Farnsworth, the mother of Browne's wife, model/actor Phyllis Major. Major had died in March 1976 of an overdose, an apparent suicide, during the period of the recording of the album. According to the Internet Movie Database, Major's mother visited with Browne and Phyllis on vacation in Paris following the Late for the Sky tour. Farnsworth "asked Jackson to peruse an unfinished song she had written. Jackson liked the lyrics and incorporated them into a song." The lyrics concern a lover who had left because that person "needed to be free" and "had some things to work out alone," and the narrator's reaction to that return, with the lover claiming they had "grown:"

...When I can look at you without crying,
You might look like a friend of mine.

But I don't know if I can
Open up enough to let you in.
Here come those tears again.

The song concludes with an apparently final rejection of the lover:

I'm going back inside and turning out the light,
And I'll be in the dark, but you'll be out of sight.

John Hall of Orleans plays the guitar solo, although the arrangement is dominated by Billy Payne's piano and Mike Utley's organ, as well as Bonnie Raitt and Rosemary Butler's harmonizing backup vocals. Veteran session musician Jim Gordon plays the drums and Bob Glaub plays bass, while acoustic guitar and electric guitar are played by Fred Tackett.

== Reception ==
Billboard Magazine described "Here Come Those Tears Again" as an "archetypal love-lost adult ballad" and praised Browne's vocal performance and the "memorable" melody in the chorus. Cash Box said that "Browne's lyric explores frustration in love, through some memorable turns of melody."

Ultimate Classic Rock critic Michael Gallucci rated it as Browne's 8th greatest song, saying that "Browne futilely tries to hide the scars of his broken heart. He's bitter, angry and not ready to forgive. But most of all he's at his most revealing here." Classic Rock History critic Brian Kachejian rated it as Browne's 3rd greatest song, saying that "It is perhaps Jackson Browne's most poignant song of heartbreak he has ever written, not counting the entire I'm Alive album."

== Chart positions ==
Chart (1977)	Peak position
Canada Top Singles (RPM)	19
US Billboard Hot 100	23
US Adult Contemporary (Billboard)	15
