= Birtha (band) =

American female rock group

Birtha was an American all-female rock band of the early 1970s. Formed in Los Angeles, the band consisted of Shele Pinizzotto (guitar), Rosemary Butler (bass), Sherry Hagler (keyboards), and Olivia "Liver" Favela (drums). Each of the band members contributed lead vocals and harmonies.

== Biography ==
Pinizzotto, Butler, and Hagler grew up in Los Angeles and Orange County and played together in bands during their high school years. Both Pinizzotto and Butler were in the Fullerton girl band named the Ladybirds. Afterwards, they formed another girl band, the Daisy Chain, with two of their peers from Fullerton Union High School. The Daisy Chain released one album, Straight or Lame, in 1967 on a small label. After the Daisy Chain broke up in 1968, Pinizzotto and Butler formed Birtha. They were joined by Favela in 1968, at which time the group began playing clubs along the West Coast from California to Alaska. Over the next three years, Birtha worked on improving their craft and by 1971 they started to write their own material. Most of the band's songs were composed by members of the group, but there were occasional outside songwriting contributions, from Mark Wickman and Gabriel Mekler. The band was managed by Pinizzotto's brother, Michael.

Birtha signed a record deal with Dunhill Records in 1972 and released their debut self-titled album, produced by Mekler, later that year. After the album's release, Birtha toured the U.S., Canada, and Europe. The group achieved some notoriety when, during a UK tour with the Kinks, publicity flyers for the shows stated, "Birtha has balls". In 1972 they appeared on the UK television music show, The Old Grey Whistle Test. When Birtha made return visits to Los Angeles, they would often play Whisky a Go Go and The Troubadour, as well as a club in Glendale called The Sopwith Camel.

In 1973, Birtha released their second album, Can't Stop the Madness, produced by Chris Huston. The band continued touring and was on the road for more than 250 days a year, performing with such acts as Fleetwood Mac, Alice Cooper, Poco, Black Oak Arkansas, Cheech & Chong, B.B. King, Three Dog Night, James Gang, and more. The band broke up in 1975.

The band's cover version of "Too Much Woman for a Hen Pecked Man" was featured in the soundtrack of the 2013 Chris A. Jiménez-directed Spanish film, Perdedores Natos (Natural Born Losers).

Guitarist Michele "Shele" Pinizzotto (née Tary, later Urquhart; born April 2, 1947) died in Artesia, California, on February 4, 2014.

== Discography ==
=== Studio albums ===
- Birtha (1972), single "Free Spirit"

Track Listing :

1. Free Spirit 2. Fine Talking Man 3. Tuesday 4. Feeling Lonely 5. She Was Good To Me 6. Work On A Dream 7. Too Much Woman (For A Hen Pecked Man) 8. Judgement Day 9. Forgotten Soul

- Can't Stop the Madness (1973)

Track Listing :

1. Freedom 2. My Man Told Me 3. Don't Let It Get You Down 4. Sun 5. Let Us Sing 6. Rock Me 7. All This Love 8. (When Will Ya) Understand 9. My Pants Are Too Short 10. Can't Stop The Madness
