= Boulevard (song) =

- Autographed 7" Picture Sleeve

Single by Jackson Browne

from the album Hold Out
- B-side: "Call It A Loan"
- Released: June 1980
- Recorded: Autumn 1979–spring 1980
- Genre: Rock
- Length: 3:15
- Label: Asylum Records
- Songwriter: Jackson Browne
- Producers: Jackson Browne and Greg Ladanyi

Jackson Browne singles chronology
"You Love The Thunder" (1978)	"Boulevard" (1980)	"That Girl Could Sing" (1980)

"Boulevard" is a song written and performed by American singer-songwriter Jackson Browne. It is from his 1980 album Hold Out. When it was released as a single, it entered the Billboard Hot 100 chart at position number 72 on July 5, 1980. It peaked at number 19 and spent 16 weeks on the chart, the fifth-biggest hit of Browne's Top 40 career. Besides the United States, the song was also released as a single in Spain, Japan, the U.K., Italy and Germany. In Canada, "Boulevard" reached number four.

== Origin ==
Browne said in a radio interview: "It's about runaways, and, you know... as sort of a bystander, it's about Hollywood Boulevard. I used to live right above Hollywood Boulevard, and there's a place called The Gold Cup and there's a lot of runaway kids and there's a lot of teen prostitution around there. It was partly written from the point of view of a young person on that street, yet it's not really immersed in that. You're sort of, maybe, empathizing with them to some degree, and also trying to say 'it's only time.' It's time on the boulevard, but this doesn't mean this is who you are and where you'll always be, I guess was what I was trying to say..."

The hearts are hard and the times are tough.
Down on the boulevard, the night's enough.
And time passes slow,
Between the store front shadows and the street lights glow.
Everybody walks right by like they're safe or something ...
They don't know —

The song begins with, and is structured around, a loud electric guitar riff. According to the album liner notes, Rick Marotta guests on drums on this one song. Russ Kunkel is credited with playing drums on all other songs on the album. Danny Kortchmar adds maracas.

== Reaction ==
In his review of the Hold Out album, Robert Christgau said of "Boulevard," putting it into the context of the then-emergent punk music scene: "...but I wonder whether the lost kids (i.e., Lost Kids) in 'Boulevard' wear mohawks, and whether JB will ever find it in himself to sing to them."

Cash Box said that it has "hard ridin' lead and rhythm guitar work" and "bashing, slashing drum and percussion." Record World said that "a razor-edged guitar whips up an irresistible melody line" and "a fervent chorus backs [Browne's] distinctive vocal."

== Later uses ==
This song was heard in the 1990 pilot for the TV series Beverly Hills 90210.

== Chart performance ==
=== Weekly charts ===
Chart (1980)	Peak position
Canada RPM	4
US Billboard Hot 100	19
U.S. Cash Box Top 100	13

=== Year-end charts ===
Chart (1980)	Rank
Canada	31
US (Joel Whitburn's Pop Annual)	124
US Cash Box	87
