= The Pretender (album) =

1976 studio album by Jackson Browne

Studio album by Jackson Browne
- Released: November 1976
- Recorded: 1976
- Studio: Sunset Sound (Hollywood)
- Genre: Rock
- Length: 35:07
- Label: Asylum
- Producer: Jon Landau

Jackson Browne chronology
Late for the Sky (1974)	The Pretender (1976)	Running on Empty (1977)

Singles from The Pretender
- 1. "Here Come Those Tears Again" Released: January 1977; 2. "The Pretender" Released: May 1977

The Pretender is the fourth album by the American singer-songwriter Jackson Browne, released in 1976. It peaked at No. 5 on Billboard's album chart. The singles from the album were "Here Come Those Tears Again", which reached No. 23, and "The Pretender", which peaked at No. 58.

== Background ==
The Pretender was released after the suicide of Browne's first wife, Phyllis Major; however, contrary to popular perception, only one of the songs was written after her death: "Sleep's Dark and Silent Gate". One of the album's songs "Here Come Those Tears Again" (co-written by Major's mother Nancy Farnsworth) is dedicated to her. The album has production by Jon Landau and a mixture of styles.

The back cover of The Pretender shows Pablo Neruda's poem "Brown and Agile Child", translated by Kenneth Rexroth, in its entirety.

== Reception ==
Professional ratings
Review scores
Source	Rating
AllMusic	3.5/5 stars
Christgau's Record Guide	B
The Encyclopedia of Popular Music	4/5 stars
The Rolling Stone Album Guide	3.5/5 stars

Record World said that "Browne's tender concerns are as insightfully expressed as has become the norm, Jon Landau's production adding a subtle broadening of the rock base" and said that "'The Fuse,' 'The Pretender,' 'Sleep's Dark and Silent Gate' and 'The Only Child' are particularly moving and beautifully arranged."

In his review for AllMusic, William Ruhlmann was equivocal about the album, stating Browne "took a step back from the precipice so well defined on his first three albums, but doing so didn't seem to make him feel any better... The man who had delved so deeply into life's abyss on his earlier albums was in search of escape this time around."

In The Rolling Stone Album Guide, Marc Coleman wrote, "...even when his songwriting is sharp, the mellowing trend in his music dulls the impact. Browne eerily predicts the rise of the yuppie on The Pretender's title track, only to have his point undercut by a creeping string section." Music critic Robert Christgau gave the album a B grade, but explained, "This is an impressive record, but a lot of the time I hate it; my grade is an average, not a judgment" and "The shallowness of his kitschy doomsaying and sentimental sexism is well-known, but I'm disappointed as well in his depth of craft." In 2012, the album was ranked number 391 on Rolling Stone magazine's list of The 500 Greatest Albums of All Time. The Rolling Stone Encyclopedia of Rock & Roll says, "Its sense of despair is derived in part from the suicide of his first wife, Phyllis, in 1976, two and a half years after the birth of their son, Ethan." The single "Here Come Those Tears Again" was credited as co-written with Nancy Farnsworth, Phyllis Major's mother.

Classic Rock History critic Brian Kachejian rated three songs from the album as being among Browne's ten greatest songs – "The Fuse", "Here Come Those Tears Again" and the title track – and said that "just about every song from the album could have made this list."

The title track was used in the 1995 film Mr. Holland's Opus.

== Track listing ==
All tracks are written by Jackson Browne except where noted.

Side one

1) "The Fuse" – 5:50

2) "Your Bright Baby Blues" – 6:05

3) "Linda Paloma" – 4:06

4) "Here Come Those Tears Again" (Browne, Nancy Farnsworth) – 3:37

Side two

5) "The Only Child" – 3:43

6) "Daddy's Tune" – 3:35

7) "Sleep's Dark and Silent Gate" – 2:37

8) "The Pretender" – 5:53

== Personnel ==
- Jackson Browne – vocals, acoustic guitar (1, 2), piano
- Leland Sklar – bass guitar (1, 6, 7)
- Chuck Rainey – bass guitar (2, 5)
- Russ Kunkel – drums (1)
- Jim Gordon – drums (2, 4)
- Jeff Porcaro – drums (5–8)
- Craig Doerge – acoustic piano (1, 6, 7, 8)
- Roy Bittan – acoustic piano (2)
- Bill Payne – Hammond organ (2), acoustic piano (4, 5)
- David Lindley – slide guitar (1, 6), violin (5)
- Lowell George – slide guitar (2), harmony vocals (2)
- Arthur Gerst – harp (3), backing vocals (3), musical arrangements (3)
- Roberto Gutierrez – guitarrón (3), violin (3), backing vocals (3)
- Luis Damian – acoustic guitar (3), backing vocals (3)
- Michael Utley – Hammond organ (4)
- John Hall – guitar solo (4)
- Fred Tackett – acoustic guitar (4, 5, 7, 8), electric guitar (4, 7, 8), guitar left (6)
- Bob Glaub – bass (4, 8)
- Albert Lee – electric guitar (5)
- Waddy Wachtel – guitar right (6)
- Jim Horn – saxophone (6), horn arrangements (6)
- Quitman Dennis – saxophone (6)
- Dick Hyde – trombone (6)
- Chuck Findley – trumpet (6)
- David Campbell – string arrangements (7, 8)

harmony vocals:

- Rosemary Butler (4), Bonnie Raitt (4)
- Don Henley (5), JD Souther (5)
- David Crosby (8), Graham Nash (8)

== Production ==
- Producer – Jon Landau
- Engineers – John Haeny (Tracks 1, 2 & 4–8); Greg Ladanyi (Track 3).
- Additional recording – Mark Howlett
- Assistant recording – Paul Black
- Mixing – Greg Ladanyi (Tracks 1–6 & 8); Val Garay (Track 7).
- Mix assistant – Dennis Kirk (Tracks 1–6 & 8)
- Mixed at The Sound Factory (Hollywood, CA).
- Mastered by Bernie Grundman at A&M Mastering Studios (Los Angeles, CA).
- Management – Mark Hammerman
- Art direction and design – Gary Burden
- Back cover photo – Jackson Browne
- Front cover photo – Tom Kelley
- Other photography – Howard Burke, Peter Golden and Tony Lane.
- Liner notes – Pablo Neruda and Kenneth Rexroth

== Charts ==
=== Weekly charts ===
Chart (1976–77)	Peak position
Australia (Kent Music Report)	18
Canada Top Albums/CDs (RPM)	23
Dutch Albums (Album Top 100)	11
UK Albums (Official Charts)	26
US Billboard 200	5

=== Year-end charts ===
Chart (1977)	Position
US Billboard 200	29

Singles – Billboard (United States)

Year	Single	Chart	Position
1977	"Here Come Those Tears Again"	Pop Singles	23
1977	"The Pretender"	Pop Singles	58

=== Certifications ===
The album was certified as a gold record in 1976 and platinum in 1977 by the RIAA. It reached multi-platinum in 1997 and 2006.

Region	Certification	Certified units/sales
United Kingdom (BPI)	Silver	60,000^{^}
United States (RIAA)	3× Platinum	3,000,000^{^}
^{^} Shipments figures based on certification alone.
