= Merriweather Post Pavilion =

Outdoor concert venue in Maryland, U.S.

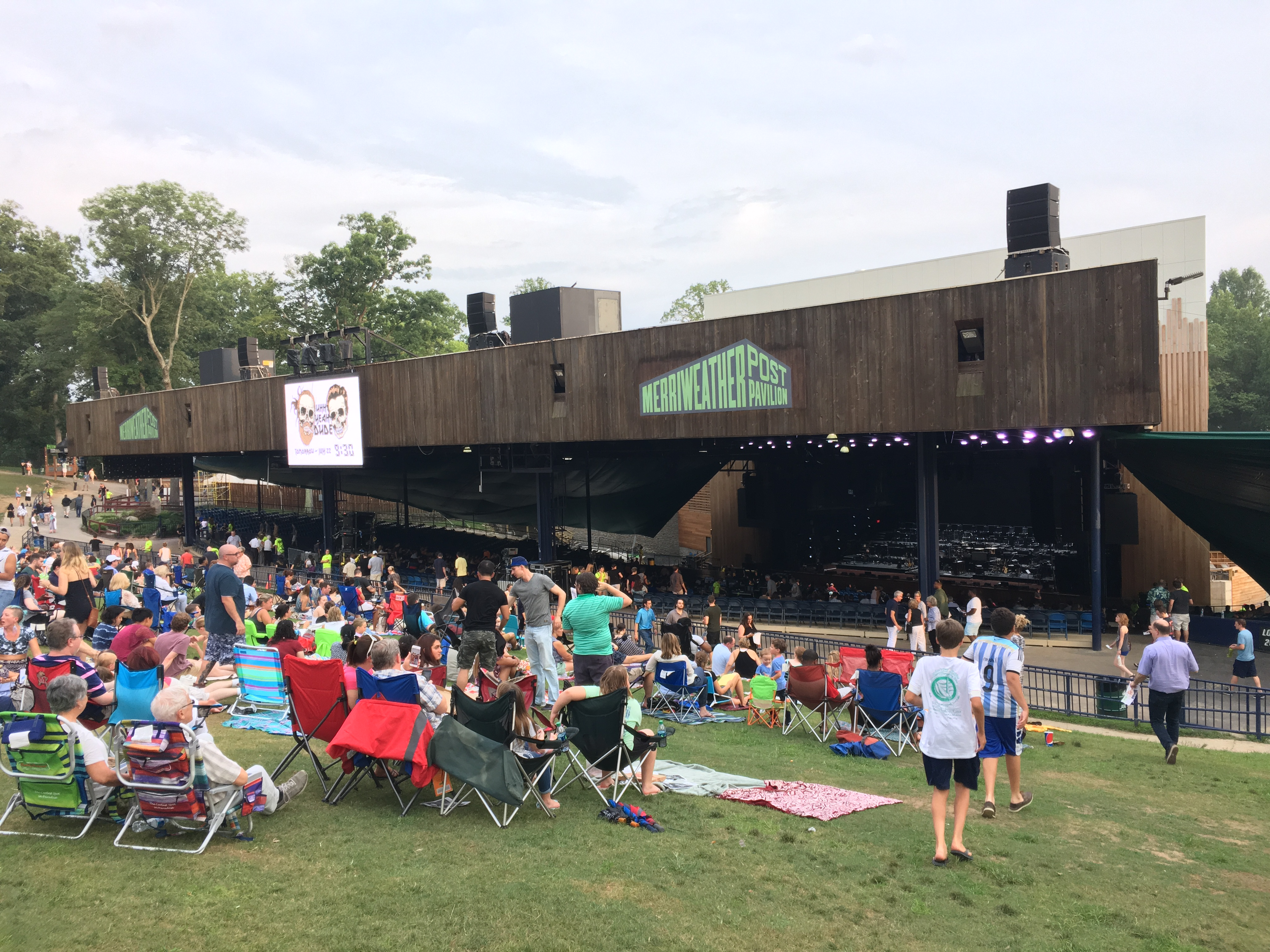
- Merriweather Post Pavilion in 2017 (prior to major renovations)
- Interactive map of Merriweather Post Pavilion
- Address: 10475 Little Patuxent Parkway
- Location: Columbia, Maryland, U.S.
- Coordinates: 39°12′33.29″N 76°51′45.61″W
- Owner: Downtown Columbia Arts and Culture Commission
- Operator: I.M.P. LLC
- Seating type: Lawn, stadium
- Capacity: 19,319
- Type: Amphitheater
- Event: Music
- Public transit: RTA 406 (Central Library stop); RTA 501 , RTA 503, MTA 315 (Broken Land/Hickory Ridge) Flash BRT (Blue)

Construction
- Opened: 1967; 59 years ago
- Renovated: 2015–2016, 2018
- Architects: Gehry, Walsh, & O'Malley

Website
- merriweathermusic.com

Merriweather Post Pavilion is an outdoor concert venue located in the planned community of Columbia, Maryland, a suburb of Baltimore and Washington, DC. In 2010, Merriweather was named the second best amphitheater in the United States by Billboard magazine. The venue was also ranked as the fourth best amphitheater in the United States by Rolling Stone in 2013. It was again ranked by Consequence of Sound at number 29 of all music venues in the nation out of 100 in 2016. In 2023, Fodor's Travel named Merriweather the 6th-best outdoor music venue in the country.

== History ==
=== 20th century ===
Merriweather Post Pavilion was commissioned by the Rouse Company for its Howard County development project Columbia. The first design was rejected and the theatre was redesigned by award-winning architect Frank Gehry, who is best known for challenging architectural norms, and N. David O'Malley with the firm of Gehry, Walsh and O'Malley. It opened in 1967 on the former grounds of the Oakland Manor slave plantation. It is named for the American Post Foods heiress Marjorie Merriweather Post to honor her for her years of sustained financial support for the National Symphony. The theatre was originally intended to be a summer home for the National Symphony Orchestra. It later became a venue for popular music concerts, including performances by Jimi Hendrix, Janis Joplin, The Doors, Led Zeppelin, The Grateful Dead, and The Who.

A grand opening gala was held on July 14, 1967, and Vice President Hubert Humphrey attended a presentation of "Columbia: Broadsides for Orchestra" in a driving rainstorm that flooded the orchestra to its knees. The Orchestra went bankrupt the next year. In the 1968 season, controversial presidential candidate George Wallace held a 7,500-person rally on June 27, 1968, followed shortly after by candidate Eugene McCarthy.

On May 25, 1969, The Who and Led Zeppelin shared a stage for the first and only time, playing to a crowd of 20,000. Led Zeppelin performed "Whole Lotta Love" live for just the second time ever, and allegedly ran long in their opening slot, resulting in their plug being pulled by The Who's production crew.

Before the start of the 1970 season, loge sections were built (adding 1,800 seats) in order to book a seven-night run of Tom Jones, featuring Gladys Knight & the Pips as the opening act.

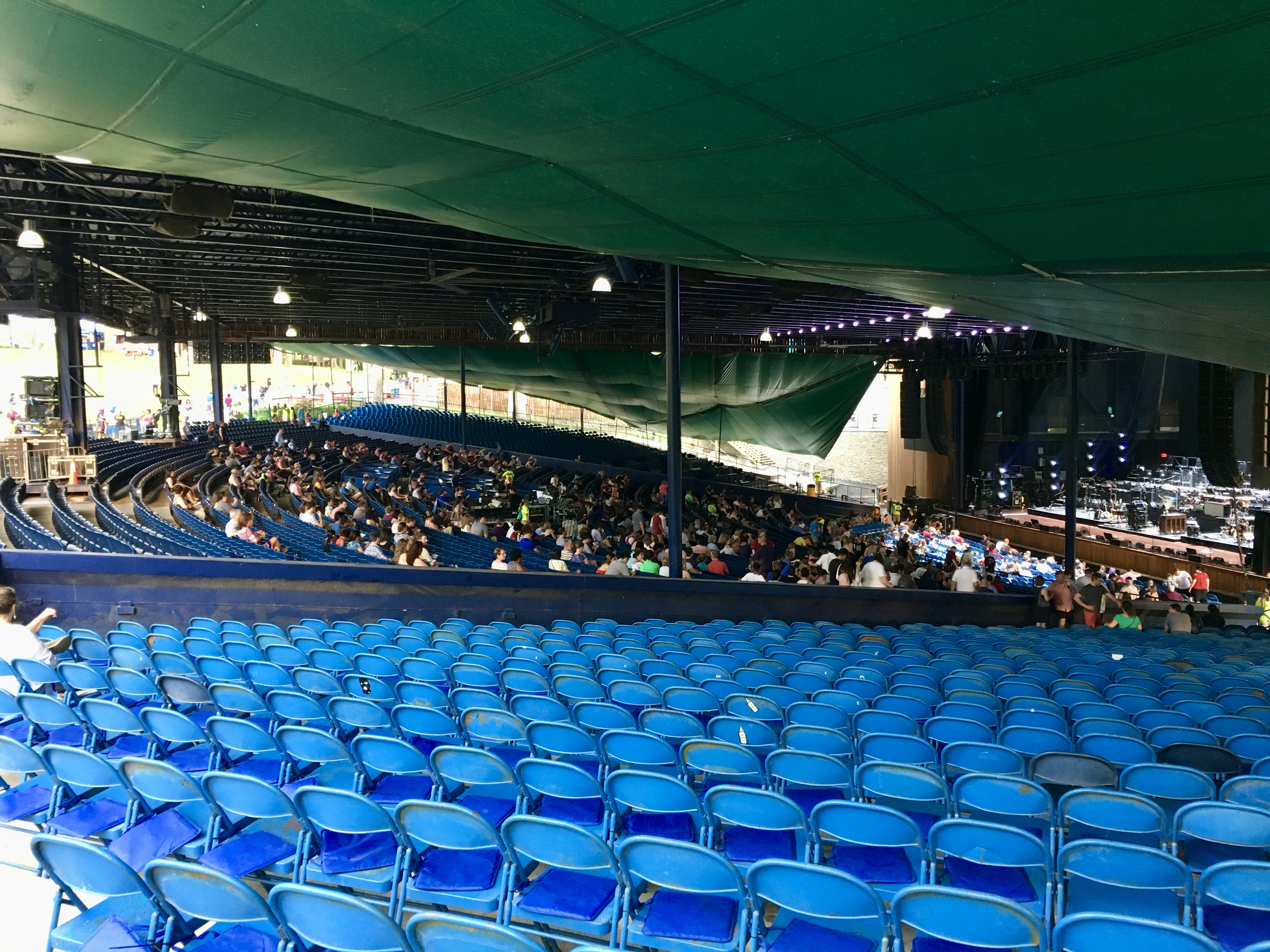
Pavilion seats prior to renovation

In 1970, Columbia's manager Richard Anderson dropped bookings of rock groups after gate crashing and disturbances at a Steppenwolf concert. The Nederlander Organization began managing the venue in 1971. By 1972, the music shifted from Rouse & Merriweather's vision of symphonies to rock performers, and Charles E. Miller proposed bills that would disallow performances of entertainers with a history of violence in venues with a capacity of 3,000 or more. In the summer of 1974, Howard Research and Development manager Micheal Spear banned rock music after more incidents, listing Alice Cooper, Edgar Winter, and the Grateful Dead as artists that were unacceptable. By 1983 however, the embargo on the Grateful Dead had been lifted and the band played two shows a year there from 1983 to 1985, with the Jerry Garcia Band playing two more in 1989.

In 1977, Jimmy Buffett performed at Merriweather for the first time. He played a total of 42 times, the most by any act.

In 1978, and again in 1980 during his campaign against Ronald Reagan, President Jimmy Carter joined Willie Nelson on stage to sing a duet of "Georgia on My Mind".

SFX bought the entertainment lease in 1999.

=== 21st century ===
In 2003, development by General Growth Properties threatened to shutter the pavilion, drawing the ire of local Columbia teens, along with former bandmates Ian Kennedy and Justin Carlson, who launched and sustained a grassroots "Save Merriweather" campaign to keep the concert venue open. As part of the fight, Kennedy vowed not to shave his beard until the future of Merriweather was secure.

As "Save Merriweather" began to pick up steam, General Growth Properties offered to sell Merriweather to Howard County on condition that the pavilion be converted into a much smaller, enclosed theater. Shortly thereafter, 9:30 Club owner Seth Hurwitz's I.M.P. was chosen as Merriweather's new promoter amidst the claim by GGP's General Manager that trying to make Merriweather Post Pavilion profitable was like "trying to sell ice cubes in the middle of winter."

In 2005, Howard County held a charrette to discuss redevelopment of the Rouse Planned community beyond its initial 100,000 population design. In 2010, The Downtown Columbia Plan passed, requiring the developer, General Growth Properties (now the Howard Hughes Corporation), to renovate Merriweather before additional development could occur in Columbia. In 2014, County Executive Ken Ulman proposed a bill to relieve Howard Hughes of the renovation expense including a $10 million grant. The final plan which only granted $9.5 million to the developer was announced at a Jack Johnson concert on June 5, 2014, removing a major development restriction.

Virgin Mobile's FreeFest was hosted at Merriweather Post Pavilion for five years, from 2009 to 2013. Each festival was free to attend contingent on attendees completing charitable tasks in their community. VIP tickets were also available to purchase, with proceeds donated to the RE*Generation House homeless youth shelter in Washington, D.C. An estimated 50,000 people attended each year, which included guest appearances by Virgin's CEO, Sir Richard Branson, and such acts as Jack White, LCD Soundystem, Pavement, The Black Keys, Vampire Weekend, M83, TV on the Radio, MGMT, and St. Vincent.

The majority of the wooded and open field land surrounding Symphony Woods and Merriweather served as a park, festival site, event parking, and site of yearly Symphony of Lights Christmas light displays. As part of the redevelopment initiative, the owner Howard Hughes Corp rezoned the land for a project called the "Crescent", which would relocate the Banneker fire department, redevelop the area into 2,100 homes and 1,125,000 square feet (104,500 m^{2}) of general and medical office space, in 20-story-high buildings. The Crescent project gets its name from the shape of the work area surrounding the pavilion, as well as Rouse's (Howard Hughes') partnership with Crescent Real Estate Equities on its Woodlands development.

In August 2014, the site made national news when two patrons died and twenty others were hospitalized from drug overdoses after a Mad Decent concert. Venues across the country implemented stricter drug enforcement controls after the incident.

Merriweather Post draws a regional traffic base with 90% of concert attendees traveling from outside of Howard County.

In 2015, the Howard County Planning Board approved a submission by Brian Spencer, a registered lobbyist and project manager by Howard Hughes. The $8.4 million design by Jamie Pett (JP2 architects) includes renovation with new concession stands around the 9:32 club and replacement of the condemned restrooms.

On November 30, 2016, The Howard Hughes Corporation transferred ownership of Merriweather Post Pavilion and Symphony Woods to the Downtown Columbia Arts and Culture Commission, a nonprofit organization helmed by "Save Merriweather" co-founder Ian Kennedy. At the official ceremony, Kennedy shaved the beard he had been growing for 13 years, since the beginning of the campaign in 2003.

2017 marked Merriweather Post Pavilion's 50th season, celebrated in part by I.M.P.'s signing of a new 40-Year lease to continue operating Merriweather through 2057. The celebration continued with the completion of $55 Million of renovations creating 15,000 square feet of dressing rooms and backstage areas including a swimming pool and dining room. The renovations also include the expansion of the stage house in preparation for raising the pavilion's famed roof, the installation of a turntable inset in the stage, and new bathrooms and concessions for patrons, as well as a new VIP rooftop bar.

In honor of its history, artists from Paul Simon and Sarah McLachlan to Santana returned to the Merriweather stage in 2017, including an Anniversary show featuring Jackson Browne, Willie Nelson, Father John Misty, and Grace Potter.

Early in the morning on January 13, 2018, the roof overhanging the reserved seating at the venue suffered a total failure and collapsed. It was in the final stages of a five-month project to raise the structure by 20 feet (6.1 m) to improve sight lines for patrons on the lawn. Management quickly issued a statement indicating that the roof would be replaced, and that the venue would open as scheduled for its 2018 concert season.

== Gallery ==
Photos of Merriweather After Renovations
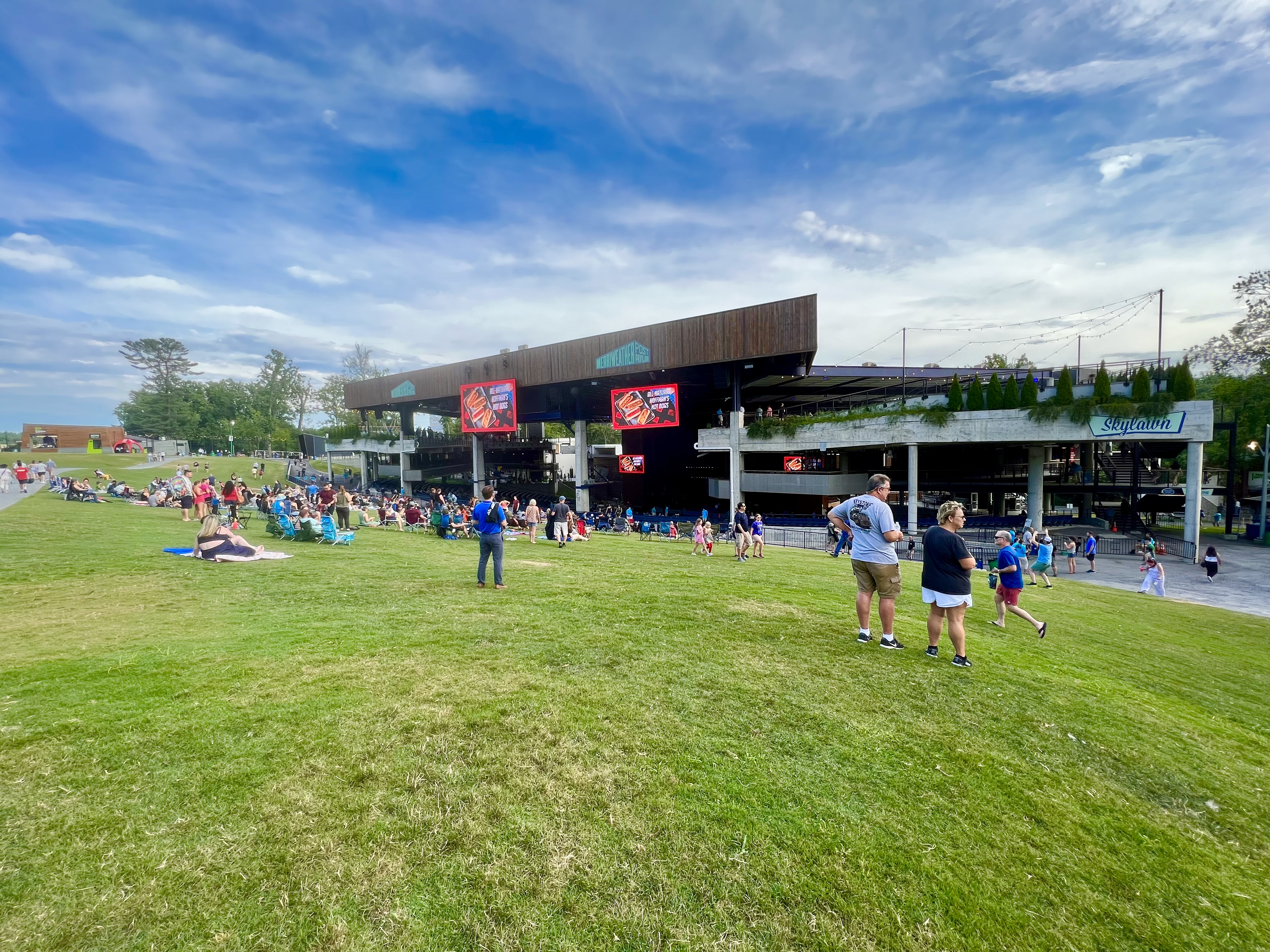
Merriweather Post Pavilion from the lawn

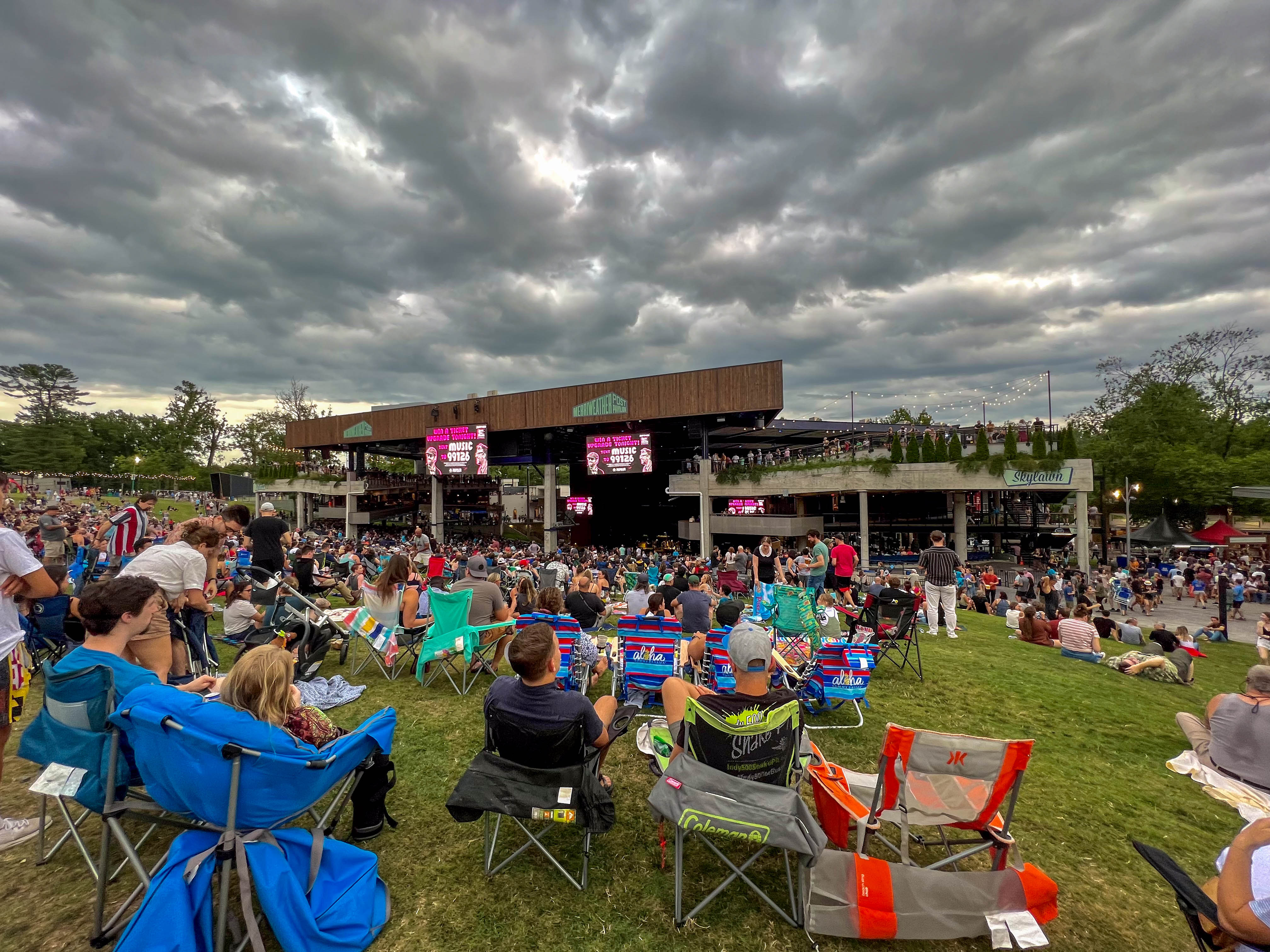
Merriweather lawn after 2018 renovations

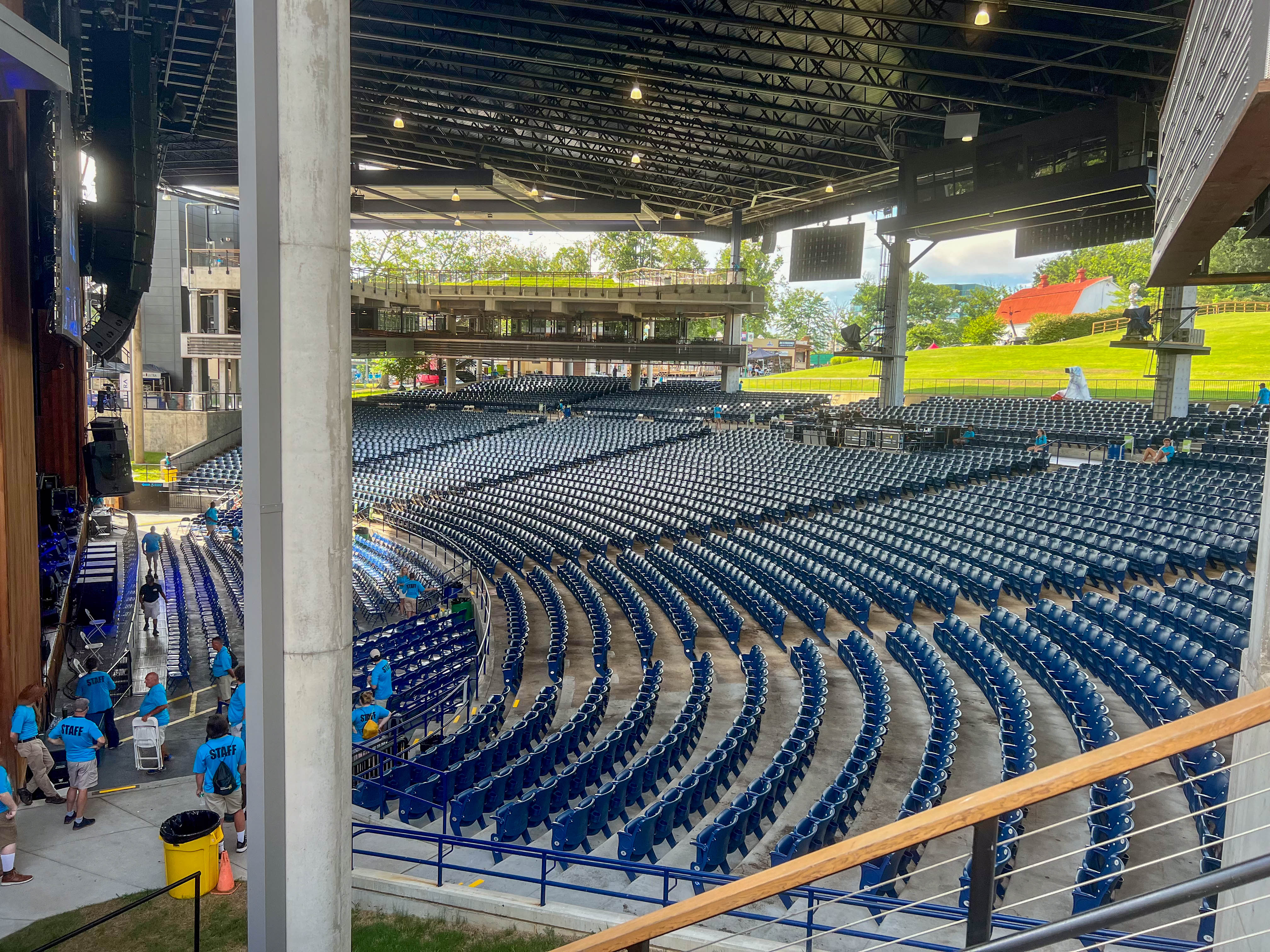
Pavilion after 2018 renovation, from the Skybar

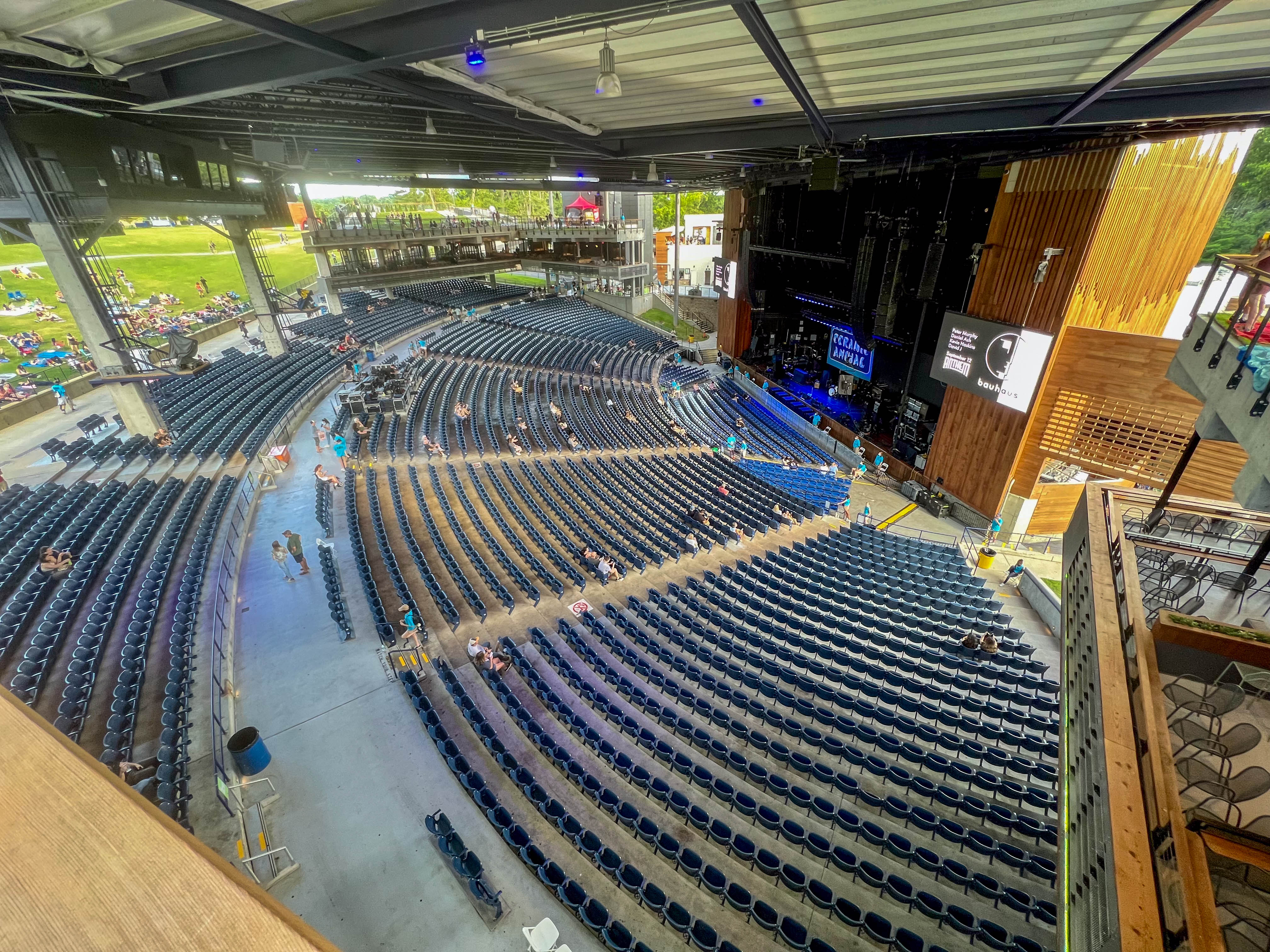
Pavilion after 2018 renovation, from the Skylawn

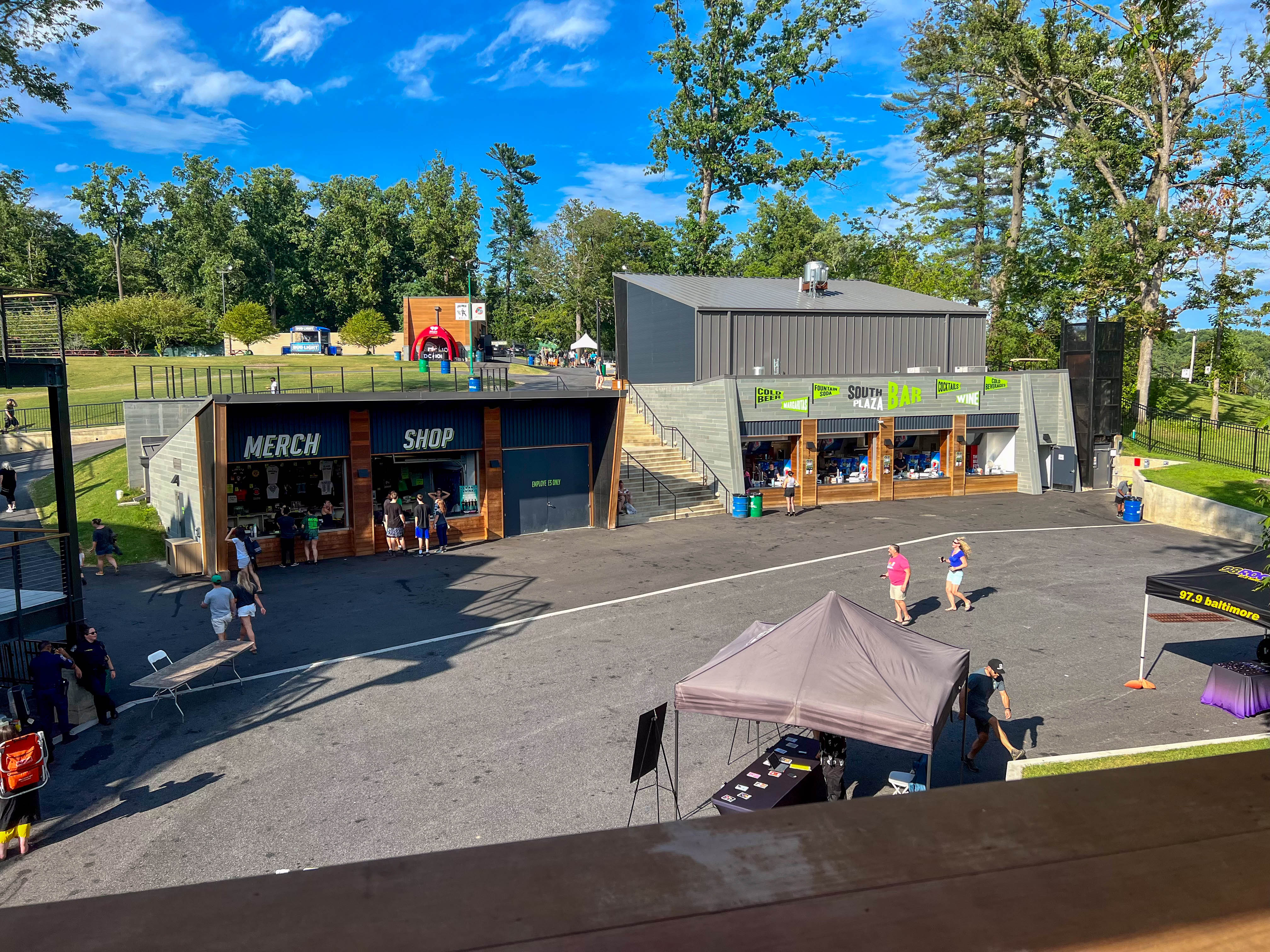
Merch desks after renovation

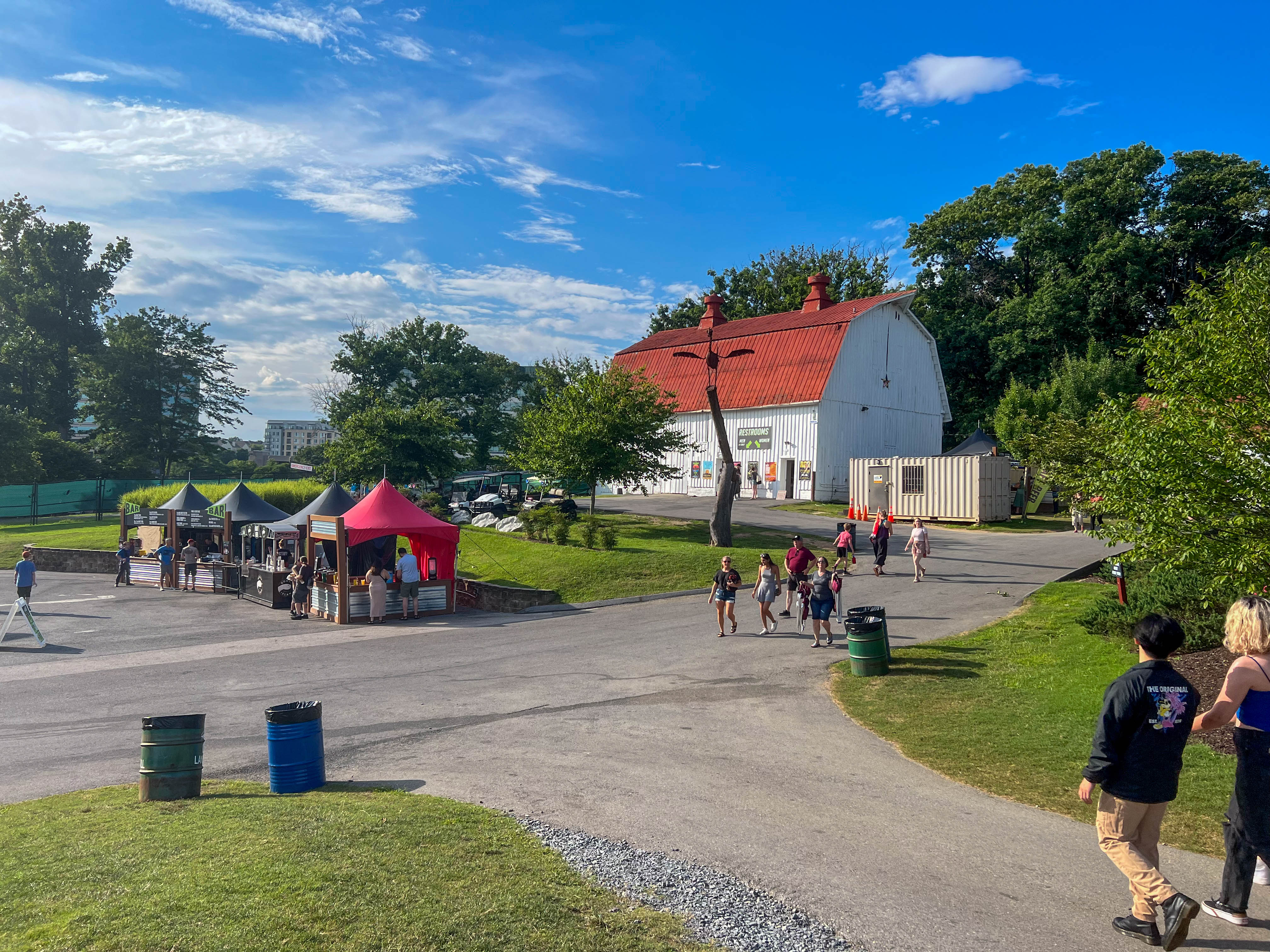
Restroom barn

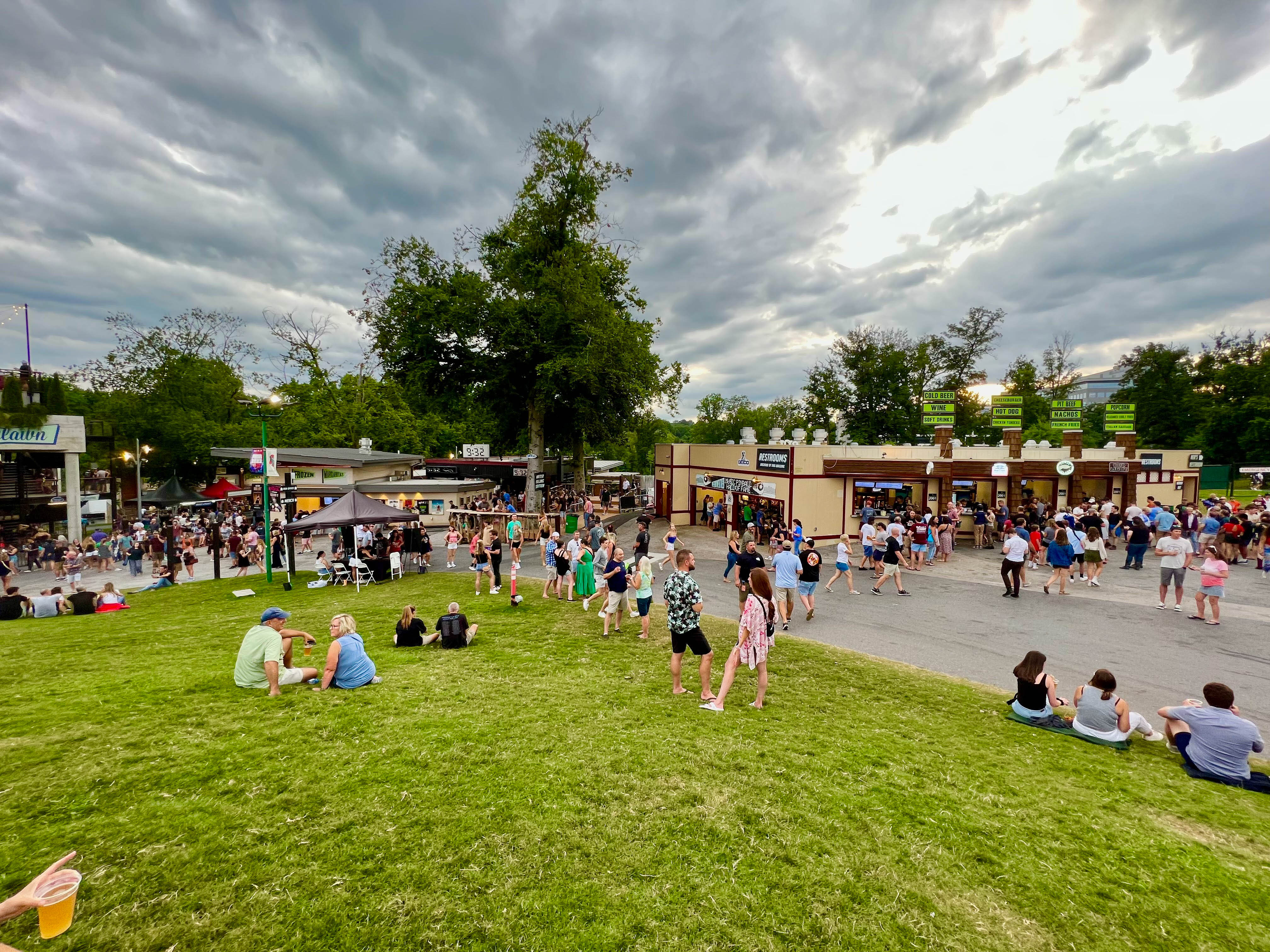
Renovated food and drink stands

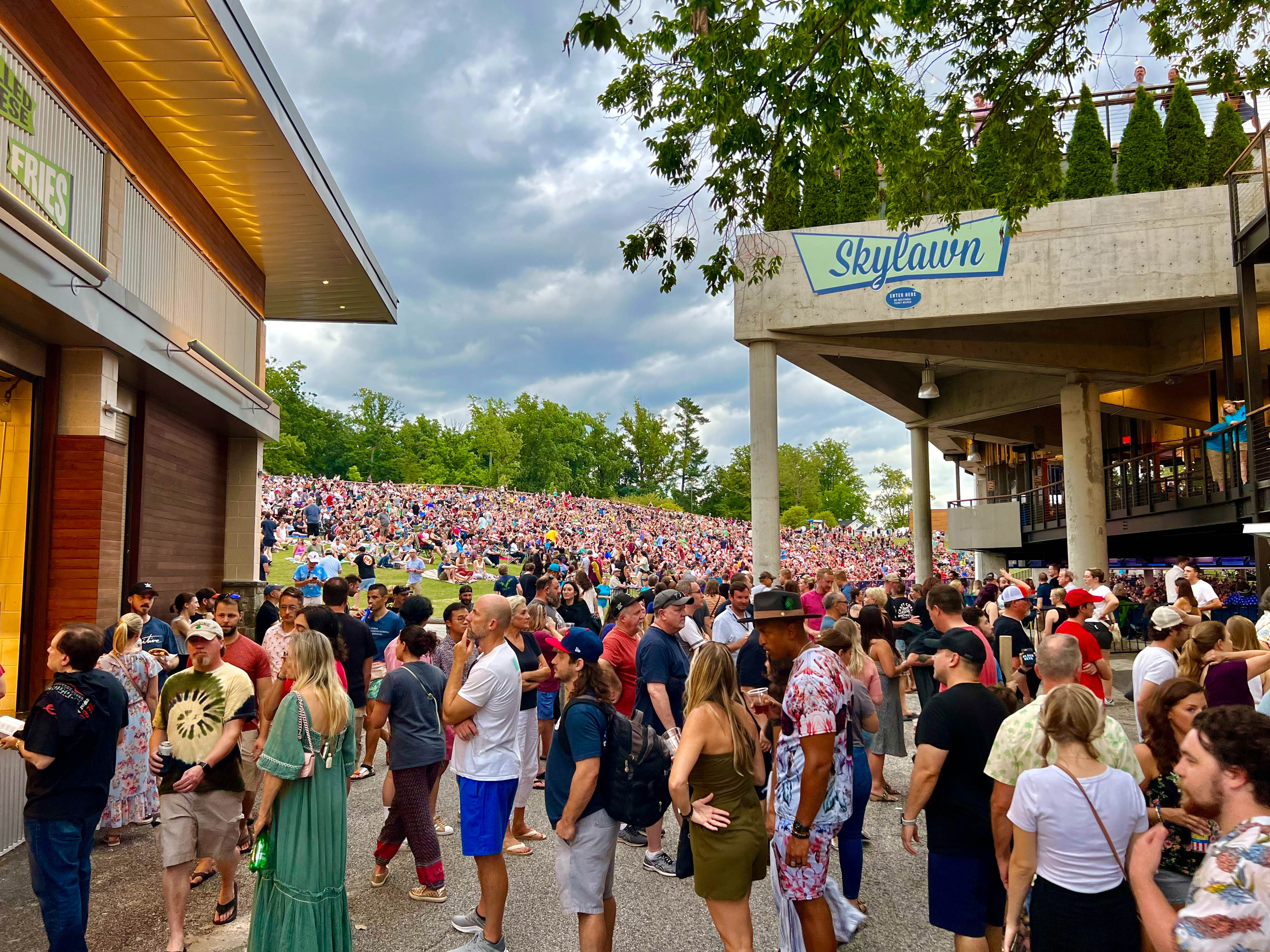
Renovated food and drink stands and Skylawn

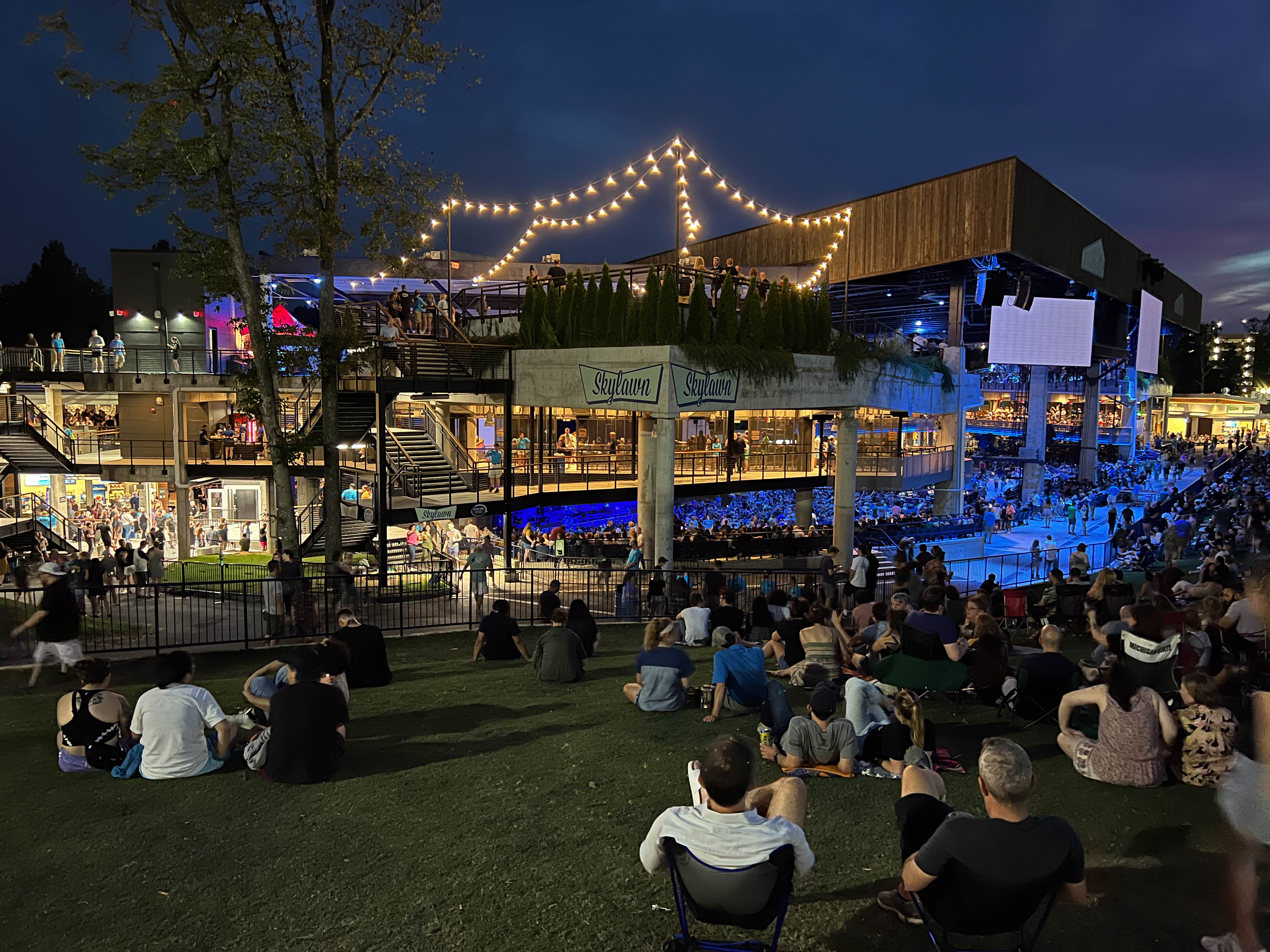
Merriweather at night after 2018 renovations
Example 1

== In popular culture ==
- Three tracks from Jackson Browne's Running on Empty including the title track were recorded at the pavilion on August 27, 1977.
- Two tracks from a remastered edition of Men at Work's Cargo were recorded at Merriweather on July 28, 1983.
- Animal Collective's critically acclaimed 2009 album Merriweather Post Pavilion is named in tribute to the pavilion, though the band did not actually perform there until 2011.
- O.A.R. recorded its seventh live album at the pavilion on September 7, 2019.

== Events ==
List of Events
- Jackson Browne – August 27, 1977 (see above "In Popular Culture" and Running on Empty)
- Whitney Houston - The Greatest Love World Tour July 26, 1986
- "Sweetlife Festival" – May 1, 2011 with The Strokes, Girl Talk, Lupe Fiasco, Crystal Castles, Cold War Kids, Ra Ra Riot, Theophilus London, Walk the Moon, U.S. Royalty, and Modern Man
- Kid Cudi – "The Cud Life Tour" July 2, 2011
- The Black Eyed Peas - The Beginning Massive Stadium Tour July 30, 2011
- My Morning Jacket – August 12, 2011 and July 26, 2015 with Jason Isbell
- "2011 Summer Spirit Festival" – August 14, 2011 featuring Nas, Damian Marley, The Roots, Chuck Brown, Bilal, The Foreign Exchange (Phonte & Nicolay), Miguel, and King
- Lupe Fiasco – "Generation Laser Tour" September 16, 2011 with Wale, Big Sean, Miguel, and Tinie Tempah
- "Sweetlife Festival" – April 28, 2012 with Avicii, Kid Cudi, The Shins, Explosions in the Sky, Fitz and the Tantrums, A$AP Rocky, and Fun.
- "2012 Summer Spirit Festival" – August 4, 2012 featuring Erykah Badu, Common, Chuck Brown Tribute featuring Chuck Brown's Band (including KK and D. Floyd) with James Funk, Sugar Bear, "Big" Tony, and Andre "Whiteboy" Johnson, Sharon Jones & The Dap-Kings, Estelle, Eric Roberson, Huggy Lowdown, Chris Paul, and Red Grant
- "Sweetlife Festival" – May 11, 2013 with Phoenix, Passion Pit, Kendrick Lamar, Yeah Yeah Yeahs, Solange Knowles, Holy Ghost!, and Youth Lagoon
- "2013 Summer Spirit Festival" – August 3, 2013 featuring D'Angelo, Erykah Badu, Busta Rhymes, Rare Essence, Black Alley, Hiatus Kaiyote, and Mike Epps
- "Sweetlife Festival" – May 10, 2014 featuring Foster the People, Lana Del Rey, 2 Chainz, Capital Cities, Fitz and the Tantrums, Bastille, Chromeo, St. Lucia, Bombay Bicycle Club, Gems, Hozier, ASTR, Spirit Animal, Nicky Blitz, and That Work
- Queen + Adam Lambert – July 20, 2014
- "2014 Summer Spirit Festival" – August 2, 2014 featuring Lauryn Hill, Janelle Monáe, Talib Kweli, Meshell Ndegeocello, Junkyard Band, Backyard Band, Rdgldgrn, George Tandy Jr., Roman Gianarthur and DJ Quicksilva
- "M3 Rock Festival" – May 1–2, 2015 featuring Cinderella's Tom Keifer, Kix, Dokken, Quiet Riot, Trixter, Dio Disciples, Europe, Queensrÿche, Krokus, Warrant, Y&T, Winery Dogs, LA Guns, Vixen, Bang Tango, Black N Blue, Tyketto, Rhino Bucket, Killer Dwarfs, and Bad Seed Rising
- "DC101 Kerfuffle" – May 3, 2015 featuring The Offspring, Incubus, Panic! at the Disco, Dirty Heads, Big Data, Andrew McMahon in the Wilderness, Robert DeLong, and Coasts
- Florida-Georgia Line – "Anything Goes Tour" May 9, 2015 with Thomas Rhett and Frankie Ballard
- "Dear Jerry, a one-time concert celebrating the music of the Grateful Dead and Jerry Garcia" – May 14, 2015
- Pentatonix – "The World Tour 2015" May 12, 2015 with Us The Duo and AJ Lehrman
- Cage the Elephant – May 15, 2015 with Portugal., The Man, and Broncho
- Kenny Chesney – "The Big Revival Tour" May 27, 2015 with Jake Owen, and Chase Rice
- "Sweetlife Festival" – May 30–31, 2015 with Kendrick Lamar, Calvin Harris, The Weeknd, The Pixies, Charli XCX, Billy Idol, and Phantogram
- The Decemberists – June 4, 2015 with Father John Misty
- "Capital Jazz Fest" – June 5, 2015 featuring Maze with Frankie Beverly, India Arie, George Clinton, Parliament/Funkadelic, and Kenny G
- Florence + The Machine – June 9, 2015
- Mumford and Sons – June 10, 2015 with The Maccabees
- Hozier – June 20, 2015 with The Antlers
- Fall Out Boy and Wiz Khalifa – "Boys of Zummer Tour" June 27, 2015 with Hoodie Allen
- "VANS Warped Tour" – July 18, 2015 featuring Icon for Hire, Family Force Five, and We the Kings
- Sam Smith – July 24, 2015
- Faith No More – August 2, 2015 with Refused
- "2015 Summer Spirit Festival" – August 8, 2015 featuring Erykah Badu, Anthony Hamilton, Floetry, Estelle, Junkyard Band, Tony! Toni! Tone!, Avery*Sunshine, and Phony Ppl
- Phish – August 15–16, 2015
- Willie Nelson and Family – August 19, 2015 with Old Crow Medicine Show
- Darius Rucker – August 22, 2015 with Brett Eldredge, Brothers Osborne, and A Thousand Horses
- O.A.R. – July 13, 2002, August 31, 2003, July 30, 2005 with The Southland, July 29, 2006 with Jack's Mannequin, August 17, 2007 with Augustana and Telograph, July 26, 2008, August 7, 2009 with Matt Nathanson, August 12, 2010 with Citizen Cope, August 13, 2011 with SOJA and Virginia Coalition, August 10, 2012 with Rebelution, August 1, 2013 with Andrew McMahon and Allen Stone, July 19, 2014 with Phillip Phillips and Saints of Valory, August 27, 2015 with Allen Stone and Brynn Elliott, and August 13, 2016
- "The Trillectro Festival" – August 29, 2015 featuring Chance the Rapper, RL Grime, and Cashmere Cat
- Death Cab For Cutie – September 13, 2015 with Explosions in the Sky
- Alabama Shakes – September 18, 2015 with Drive-By Truckers
- Of Monsters And Men – September 20, 2015
- "WPOC Weekend in the Country" – October 3–4, 2015 featuring Brantley Gilbert, Sam Hunt, Parmalee, LoCash, Kelsea Ballerini, Cam, Maren Morris, Thompson Square, Canaan Smith, Chris Janson, and Mo Pitney
- Jason Aldean – May 7, 2016 with Thomas Rhett, A Thousand Horses, Dee Jay Silver
- Pentatonix – May 12, 2016 with Us The Duo and AJ Lehrman
- "Sweetlife Festival" – May 14, 2016 featuring The 1975, Halsey, Flume, Grimes, PartyNextDoor, Blondie, Eagles of Death Metal, Mac DeMarco, Thundercat, Vince Staples, Shamir, Wolf Alice, DIIV, and Prinze George
- Kenny Chesney – May 19, 2016 with Old Dominion
- Capital Jazz Fest – June 3–5, 2016 with New Edition, En Vogue, KING, Donnie Simpson, Brian Culbertson, Lalah Hathaway, Marcus Miller, Raul Midon, "Jazzing Up The Elements: A Musical Tribute to Maurice White", Take 6, The Isley Brothers, Al B. Sure!, SWV, Eric Roberson, Blackstreet, Will Downing, Fourplay, David Sanborn, Pieces of a Dream, Jarrod Lawson, Mike Phillips, Toni Braxton, The Brand New Heavies, Kenny Lattimore, Rick James's Original Stone City Band, and Tamia
- Twenty One Pilots – June 10, 2016 with Mutemath and Chef'Special
- Ellie Goulding – June 13, 2016 with Matt and Kim
- Tame Impala – June 16, 2016 with M83
- Chris Stapleton & Jason Isbell – June 18, 2016 with Frank Turner and the Sleeping Souls
- The Cure – June 22, 2016 with The Twilight Sad
- "DC101 Kerfuffle" – June 26, 2016 with blink-182, Silversun Pickups, Cold War Kids, Violent Femmes, Bear Hands, The Strumbellas, and Joywave
- Merryland Music Fest – July 9–10, 2016 featuring The String Cheese Incident, Ben Harper & The Innocent Criminals, Grace Potter, Lotus, Stephen "Ragga" Marley, Greensky Bluegrass, Shakey Graves, Yonder Mountain String Band, Langhorne Slim & The Law, Karl Denson's Tiny Universe, Nahko & Medicine for the People, Protoje, Pigeons Playing Ping Pong, Turkuaz, TAUK, and Cris Jacobs Band
- Modest Mouse and Brand New – July 12, 2016
- "Vans Warped Tour – Presented by Journeys" – July 16, 2016 featuring Falling in Reverse, Four Year Strong, Less Than Jake, New Found Glory, Reel Big Fish, Set It Off, Sum 41, We the Kings, Yellowcard, Issues, Mayday Parade, Pepper, Real Friends, Sleeping With Sirens, State Champs, The Maine, The Story So Far, Tonight Alive, Crown The Empire, Every Time I Die, Ice Nine Kills, Motionless in White, The Color Morale, The Word Alive, Volumes, Whitechapel, Chelsea Grin, Coldrain, Cruel Hand, From Ashes to New, Gideon, In Hearts Wake, Oceans Ate Alaska, Vanna, Veil of Maya, Emarosa, I See Stars, Knuckle Puck, Masked Intruder, Roam, SECRETS, The Heirs, The Interrupters, Young Guns, Against the Current, Assuming We Survive, Ballyhoo!, Chunk! No, Captain Chunk!, GHOST TOWN, SYKES, Teenage Bottlerocket, Too Close to Touch, Waterparks, Avion Roe, Bad Seed Rising, Broadside, Cane Hill, Dash Ten, Hail the Sun, Like Pacific, Mother Feather, Old Wounds, Palaye Royale, Reckless Serenade, Safe to Say, Silent Planet, Wage War, and With Confidence
- Brandi Carlile and Old Crow Medicine Show – July 23, 2016 with Dawes
- "2016 Summer Spirit Festival" – August 6–7, 2016 featuring Erykah Badu, Jill Scott, Janelle Monáe, The Roots, Gregory Porter, Team Familiar, Leela James, Kindred the Family Soul, Avery*Sunshine, The Chuck Brown Band, Daley, Wisdom Speeks, and Be'la Dona with DJ Kool and Sugar Bear
- "Carnival of Madness" and Shinedown – August 10, 2016 with Halestorm, Black Stone Cherry, and Whiskey Myers
- Train – August 20, 2016 with Andy Grammer
- Miranda Lambert – August 25, 2016 with Kip Moore and Brothers Osborne
- The Lumineers – "The Cleopatra World Tour" September 10, 2016 with BØRNS and Rayland Baxter
- Little Big Town – "WPOC Weekend In The Country" October 15 & 16,2016 with Dustin Lynch, Rodney Atkins, Old Dominion, Maddie & Tae and More
- "Easter at Merriweather" – April 16, 2017, with Bridgeway Community Church
- "M3 Rock Festival – April 28–29, 2017 featuring Rhino Bucket, Korupt, Mitch Malloy, Autograph, Junkyard, Danger Danger, Vain, Jack Russell's Great White, Bang Tango, Warrant, Vixen, Cinderella's Tom Keifer, Dokken, and Ratt
- 50th Anniversary Concert – Jackson Browne and Willie Nelson
- Gorillaz – July 17, 2017 and October 17, 2022.
- Animal Collective – July 29, 2017
- Britney Spears opened her Oops!... I Did It Again Tour at Merriweather to a sold out crowd on June 20, 2000.
- AJR - May 14, 2022
- Wallows – August 22, 2024

== See also ==
- List of contemporary amphitheatres
- List of works by Frank Gehry
- Merriweather Park at Symphony Woods
