= Rosemary Butler (singer) =

American singer (born 1947)

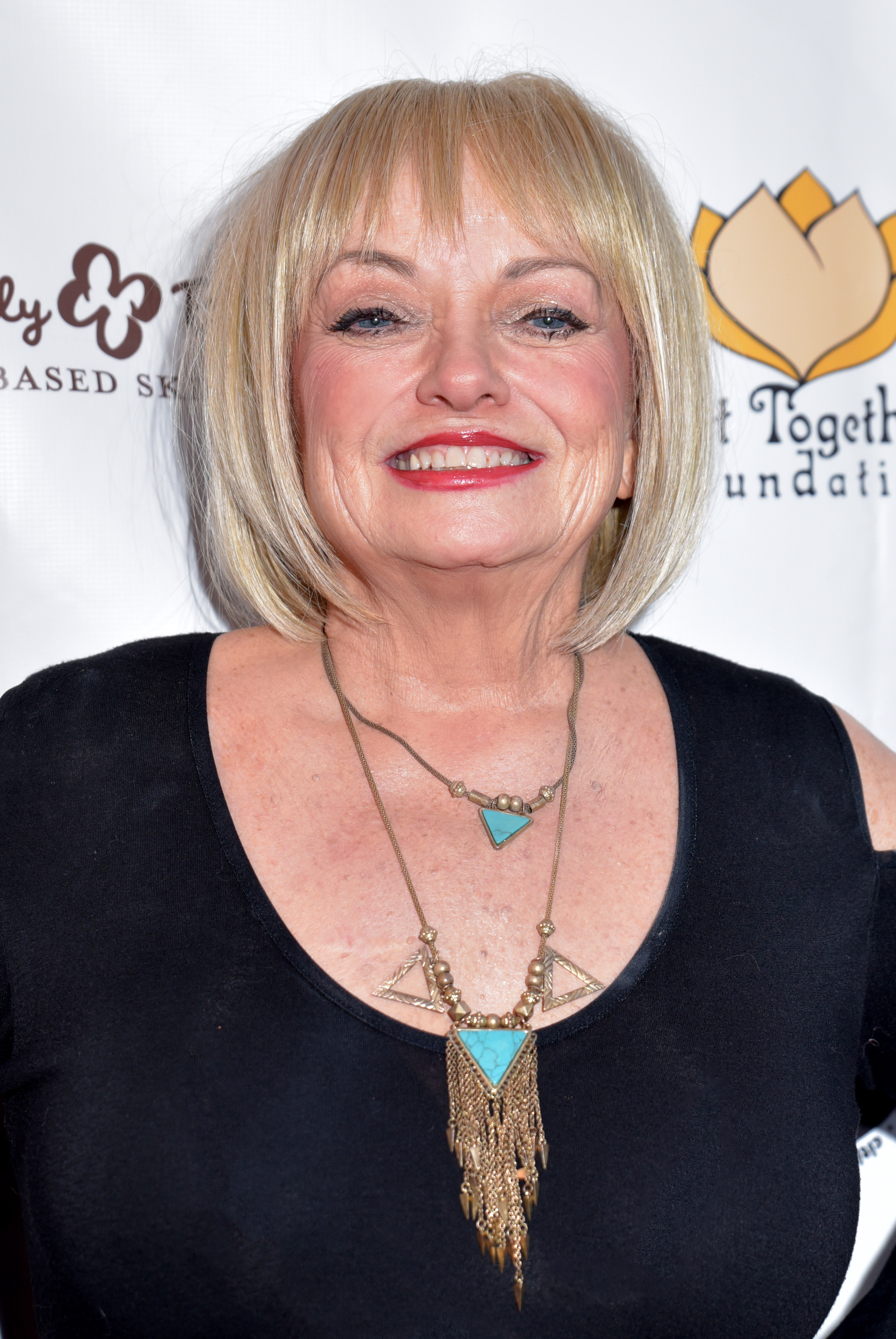
- Butler at the California Saga 2 Charity Concert in Los Angeles, 2019

Background information
- Born: Rosemary Ann Lane; April 6, 1947 (age 79); California, U.S.
- Genres: Pop, rock, country, contemporary folk, blue-eyed soul
- Occupations: singer, backing vocalist, former bassist
- Instruments: Vocals, bass (earlier)
- Years active: 1960s–present
- Formerly of: Birtha, the Daisy Chain, countless others (see text)

Rosemary Ann Butler (née Lane; born April 6, 1947) is an American singer. She began her career playing bass guitar and singing in an all-female band named the Ladybirds while attending Fullerton Union High School in Fullerton, California. The band appeared on several Los Angeles area television shows before opening for the Rolling Stones in 1964. She then joined all-female psychedelic rock band the Daisy Chain in 1967 and the all-female hard rock band Birtha in 1968, the latter of which released two albums for Dunhill Records. After they split in 1975, she became a popular back-up singer in the late 1970s and early 1980s. Her vocals were featured on Bonnie Raitt's album Sweet Forgiveness, on songs "Gamblin' Man", "Runaway", "Sweet Forgiveness" and "Two Lives". She was also featured in Bruce Springsteen, Tom Petty, and Jackson Browne's "Stay (Just A Little Bit Longer)" during Springsteen and The E Street Band's 1979 "No Nukes" shows at Madison Square Garden. Butler also sings in The Tribe, a revolving group of Los Angeles musicians and singers that includes Gary Stockdale, Stephen John Kalinich, Freebo, Fuzzbee Morse, Grant Geissman, Carly Smithson, Marc Mann, Gary Griffin, The Honeys, and band manager Lauri Reimer.

Butler worked extensively as a back-up singer for Linda Ronstadt, James Taylor, Warren Zevon, Neil Young, Bonnie Raitt, Boz Scaggs, Nitty Gritty Dirt Band, Jackson Browne, and Rosanne Cash, among others. She also released a solo studio album, Rose, in 1983, from which the promotional single "You Light Up The Night" was released.

She achieved her greatest visibility and success as a solo artist in Japan in the early 1980s, contributing songs such as "Riding High" to the movie Dirty Hero (汚れた英雄) and "Children of the Light" (光の天使) to the anime film Harmagedon. She was also co-contractor of the 100-voice choir on Neil Young's album Living with War. She co-founded "The National In Choir", a Los Angeles–based volunteer holiday choir with singer-lyricist Deborah Pearl.

After 30 years, Butler's second solo album, You Just Watch Me, was released in 2013.
