= Crossroads (1986 soundtrack) =

Crossroads OST

Soundtrack album by Ry Cooder, Steve Vai, Arlen Roth
- Released: 1986
- Studio: Ocean Way, Nashville
- Genre: Rock
- Length: 37:06
- Label: Warner Bros. Records
- Producer: Tom Whalley

Professional ratings
Review scores
Source	Rating
Allmusic	3/5 stars

Crossroads is the soundtrack to the 1986 film starring Ralph Macchio, Joe Seneca and Jami Gertz, inspired by the legend of blues musician Robert Johnson.

The film was written by John Fusco and directed by Walter Hill and featured an original score by Ry Cooder. Guitarists William Kanengiser, Arlen Roth and Steve Vai perform in the film but are not featured in the soundtrack.

== Track listing ==
No.	Title	Writer(s)	Length
1.	"Crossroads"	Ahmad Jamal, Robert Johnson, Traditional	4:24
2.	"Down in Mississippi"	J. B. Lenoir	4:25
3.	"Cotton Needs Pickin'"	Frank Frost, Richard "Shubby" Holmes, John Price, Otis Taylor	2:58
4.	"Viola Lee Blues"	Noah Lewis	3:11
5.	"See You in Hell, Blind Boy"	Ry Cooder	2:10
6.	"Nitty Gritty Mississippi" (not in the movie)	Fred Burch, Don Hill	2:57
7.	"He Made a Woman Out of Me"	Fred Burch, Don Hill	4:12
8.	"Feelin' Bad Blues"	Ry Cooder	4:16
9.	"Somebody's Callin' My Name"	Traditional	1:45
10.	"Willie Brown Blues"	Ry Cooder, Joe Seneca	3:45
11.	"Walkin' Away Blues"	Ry Cooder, Sonny Terry	3:37
Total length:			37:06

== Personnel ==
- Ry Cooder - Guitar, mandolin, vocals
- Otis Taylor - Guitar
- Frank Frost - Harmonica, vocals
- Sonny Terry - Harmonica
- John "Juke" Logan - Harmonica
- Jim Keltner - Drums
- John Price - Drums
- Jim Dickinson - Piano, dolceola
- Van Dyke Parks - Piano
- Alan Pasqua - Synthesizer
- Nathan East - Bass
- Jorge Calderón - Bass
- Richard "Shubby" Holmes - Bass
- Miguel Cruz - Percussion
- George Bohanon - Baritone sax
- Walt Sereth - Soprano sax
- Amy Madigan - Vocals
- Bobby King, Terry Evans, Willie Green Jr - Backing vocals

== Charts ==
Chart (1986/87)	Peak position
Australia (Kent Music Report)	24
US Billboard 200	85
