= Terry Evans (musician) =

American singer (1937–2018)

- Born: Terry Lee Evans; August 14, 1937; Vicksburg, Mississippi, United States
- Died: January 20, 2018 (aged 80) Los Angeles, California, United States
- Genres: R&B, blues, soul
- Occupations: Singer, guitarist, songwriter
- Instruments: Vocals, guitar
- Years active: 1960s–2018
- Labels: Various including Pointblank, AudioQuest Music, and Telarc
- Website: terryevansmusic.com/about.html

Terry Evans (August 14, 1937 – January 20, 2018) was an American R&B, blues, and soul singer, guitarist and songwriter. He worked with many musicians including Ry Cooder, Bobby King, John Fogerty, Eric Clapton, Joan Armatrading, John Lee Hooker, Boz Scaggs, Maria Muldaur and Hans Theessink. Cooder stated that he always thought that Evans made a better "frontman."

Between 1994 and his death, Evans released seven solo albums, including Blues for Thought (1994) Come to the River (1997) and Fire in the Feeling (2005). Evans' career was inspired by Elmore James, Little Walter, Albert King, and B.B. King. Songs he wrote were recorded by Pops Staples and Louis Jordan.

== Life and career ==
Terry Lee Evans was born in Vicksburg, Mississippi, United States, and sang in his local church choir. His parents were keen for him to concentrate purely on gospel music, although Evans found exposure to the work of mainstream blues musicians. He worked semi professionally with an a cappella group called the Knights before relocating in the 1960s to Los Angeles. He expanded his repertoire by learning to play the guitar and started to write songs for other musicians. Amongst those who recorded his songs were Pops Staples ("Love Is a Precious Thing") and Louis Jordan ("Hop, Skip, and Jump"). Unable to find his own fame, despite television exposure, Evans teamed with fellow soul and gospel singer, Bobby King. They performed regularly on the Chitlin' Circuit throughout the 1970s, although Evans also worked as a backing vocalist for Ry Cooder. His backup work is featured on several of Cooder's albums, including Chicken Skin Music (1976), My Name Is Buddy (2007) and some of his final recorded work featured on Cooder's The Prodigal Son (2018). Evans joint work with King saw the release of two albums in 1988 and 1990.

He gained a bigger audience through his involvement in the soundtrack to the 1986 film, Crossroads. Evans voice appeared on the title track in the film itself, and on the soundtrack on another song, "Down in Mississippi". Evans later worked with Lloyd Jones on the latter's album, Trouble Monkey, before recording his first solo album, Blues for Thought (1994). It was produced by Ry Cooder, who also played guitar on the recording. Evans sang backing vocals on the Dutch singer and guitarist Hans Theessink's 1997 album, Journey On. Evans 2001 album, Mississippi Magic was nominated for a Blues Music Award as the "Best Soul Blues Album of the Year". On Evans 2005 album, Fire in the Feeling, David Lindley guest starred playing guitar on a couple of the tracks.

Evans' last recording was his joint effort with Theessink, on Delta Time (2012). CBC News journalist, Bianca Cervantes, opined that "Delta Time is the latest transatlantic blues treasure."

In 2014, Evans was featured on the compilation Songs from a Stolen Spring. On the album Evans' performance of "Dancing in the Street" was meshed with Lebanese singer-songwriter Tania Saleh's "Not a Word was Spoken".

Evans died on January 20, 2018, in Los Angeles, California, at the age of 80.

== Discography ==
=== Albums ===
Year	Title	Record label	Notes
1988	Live and Let Live!	Rounder	with Bobby King
1990	Rhythm, Blues, Soul & Grooves	Rounder	with Bobby King
1994	Blues for Thought	Pointblank	
1995	Puttin' It Down	AudioQuest Music	
1997	Come to the River	AudioQuest Music	
2000	Walk That Walk	Telarc	
2001	Mississippi Magic	AudioQuest Music	
2003	Live Like a Hurricane	AudioQuest Music	Live album
2005	Fire in the Feeling	Valley Entertainment	
2008	Visions	Blue Groove	with Hans Theessink
2012	Delta Time	Blue Groove	with Hans Theessink
2014	Songs from a Stolen Spring	Valley Entertainment	Compilation
