= Eboardmuseum =

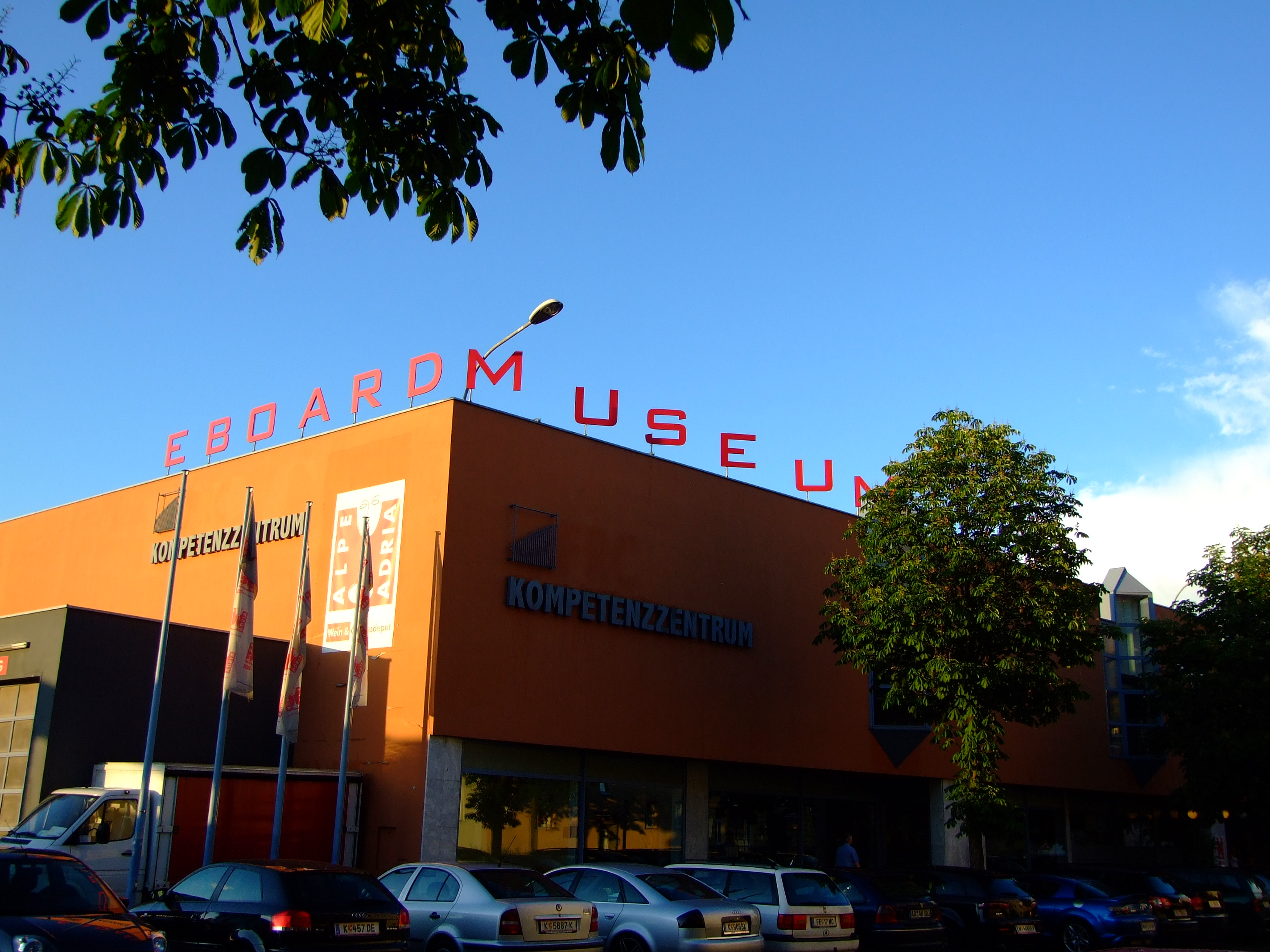
- Eboardmuseum
- Established: 1987
- Location: Klagenfurt am Wörthersee
- Coordinates: 46.6166°N 14.3050°E
- Website: www.eboardmuseum.com/home_en.html

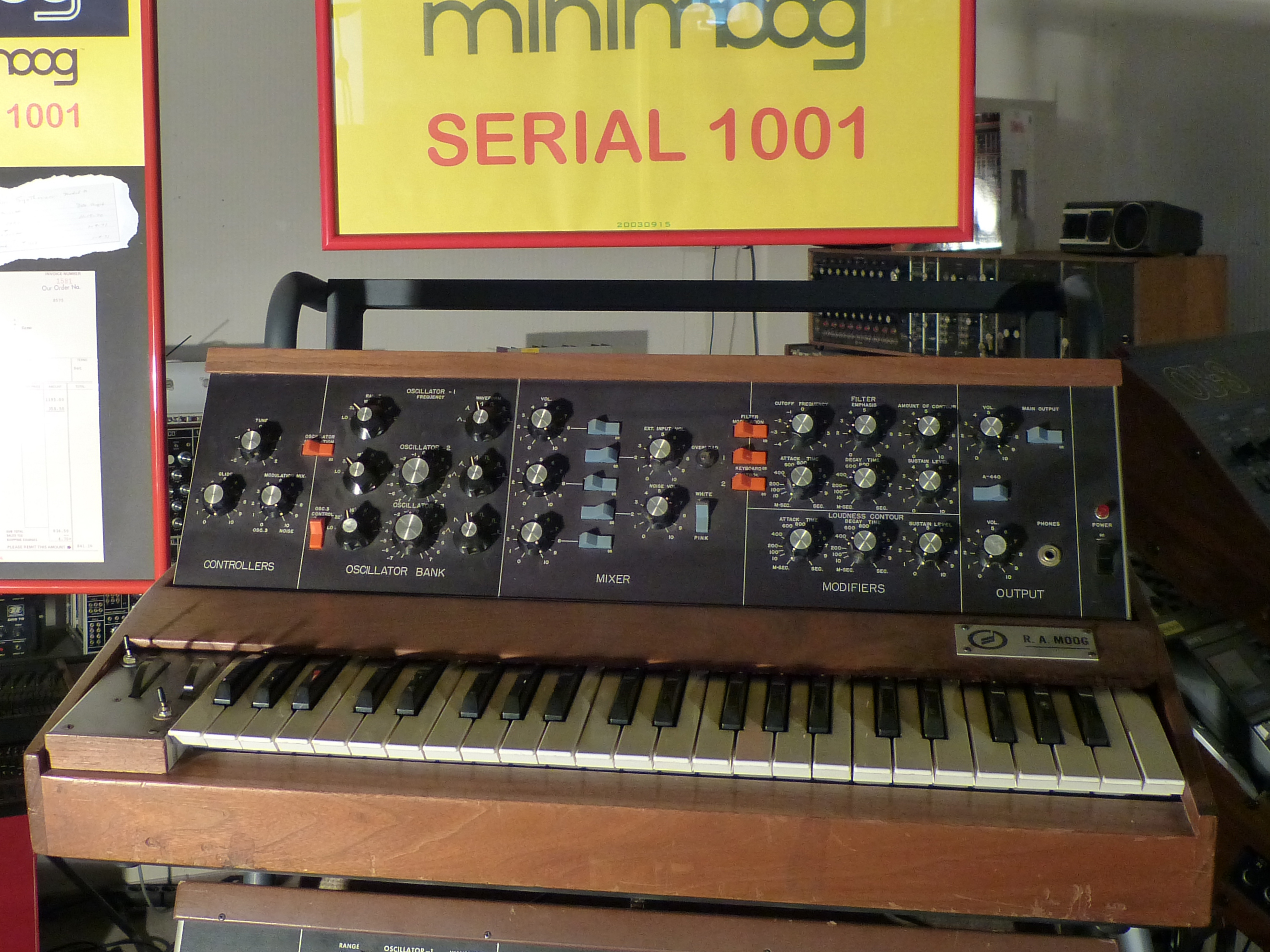
The first Minimoog D worldwide, serial number 1001

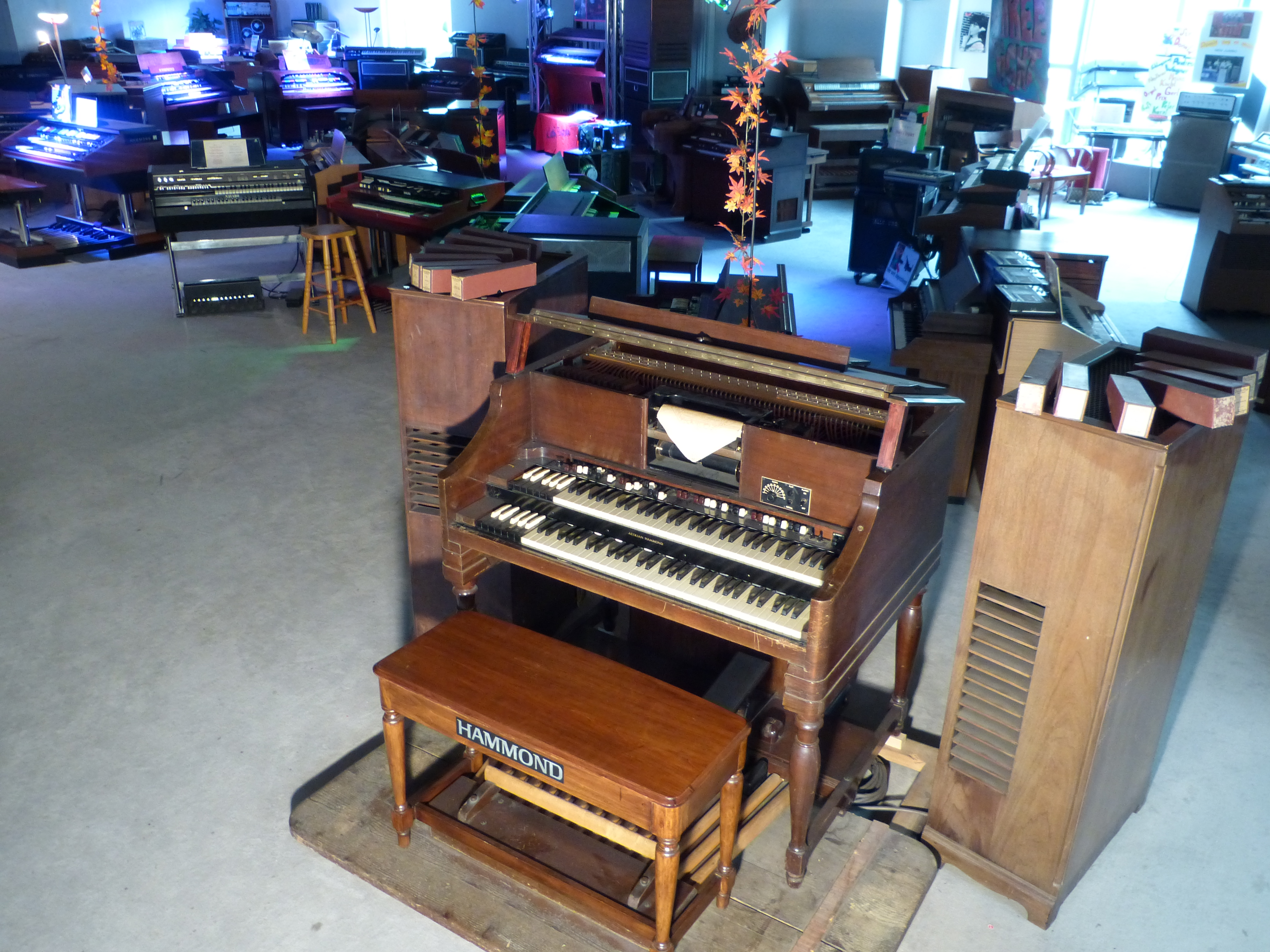
One of the last remaining 1938 Hammond BA Player Organs worldwide

The Eboardmuseum, founded in 1987 by the musician, mathematics teacher and engineer Gert Prix, is a collection of electronic keyboard instruments.

It very quickly outgrew the original venue and, in 2007, the collection was moved into a hall at the fair area in the centre of Klagenfurt am Wörthersee in Austria and is now considered to be the largest museum of its kind worldwide. In 2010, the Eboardmuseum was honored with the Austrian "Museumsguetesiegel" seal of quality.

At the invitation of Google, the Eboardmuseum has been participating in the Music, Makers & Machines project as part of Google Arts & Culture since March 2021. As part of this project, it presents a small selection of its exhibits, accompanied by video examples.

== The Museum ==
In an area of about 2,000 m^{2} the Eboardmuseum has about 2,000 exhibits.

Focusing on electronic keyboards the Eboardmuseum covers the entire history of these instruments from a 1935 Hammond model A to an up-to-date Moog Voyager.

Among the exhibits there are numerous preliminary models and unique items such as a Hohner Clavinet, Rhodes Piano, Mellotron as well as original instruments from international stars like Keith Emerson (Emerson, Lake & Palmer), Geoff Downes (Asia), Rick Wakeman (Yes), Peter Wolf (Frank Zappa), Tangerine Dream, Ken Hensley (Uriah Heep), Dave Greenslade (Colosseum), Eddie Hardin (Spencer Davis Group), King Crimson, George Duke, Ray Charles, Opus and Grateful Dead.

Unlike other musical instrument museums the Eboardmuseum not only presents its exhibits in guided tours, but also allows visitors to play the instruments. Professionals and music enthusiasts from all around the world make use of this opportunity.

The Eboardmuseum library contains literature about electronic music, focusing on keyboards, pop music and pop culture.

Guided tours in the Eboardmuseum target everybody including non-musicians and children. They aim to offer an entertaining and family-friendly trip into the world of music.

== Events ==
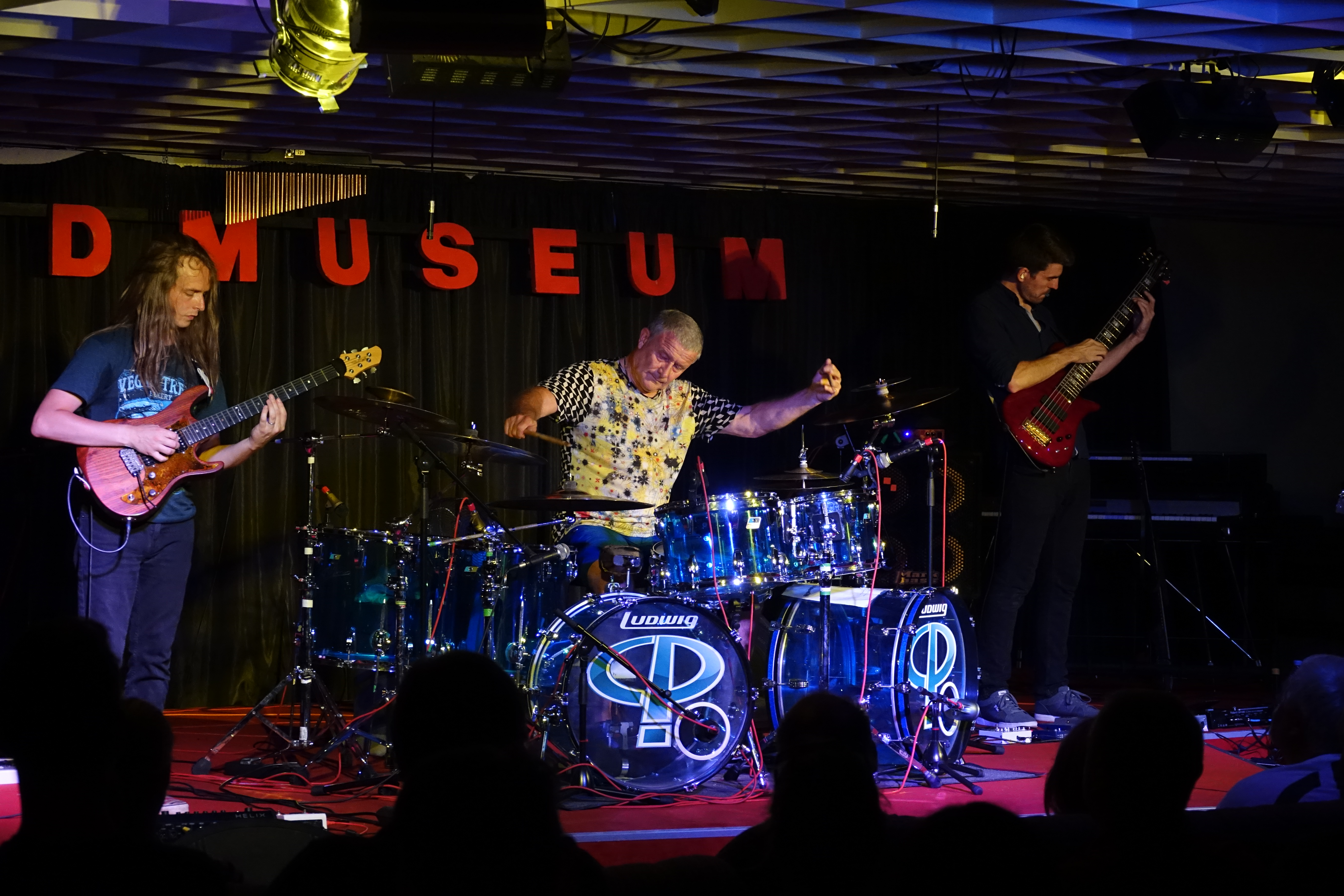
Carl Palmer (Emerson, Lake & Palmer) on Eboardmuseum stage

The Eboardmuseum hosts, on average, 50 live concerts a year. The integrated event area in the Eboardmuseum is furnished with sofas, offering a living room experience. Due to its unique location and quirky atmosphere, it constantly attracts big names from the world of music. In spite of its a relatively small auditorium, musicians such as Carl Palmer (Emerson, Lake & Palmer, Asia), Ian Paice (Deep Purple), Peter Ratzenbeck, Brian Auger, Wolfgang Ambros, Alex Ligertwood (Santana), Ken Hensley, Hans Theessink, Barbara Dennerlein, Nick Simper and Don Airey (Deep Purple) and Waterloo & Robinson have all performed on the Eboardmuseum stage. The previous and future programs are documented on the Eboardmuseum website.

== Service area ==
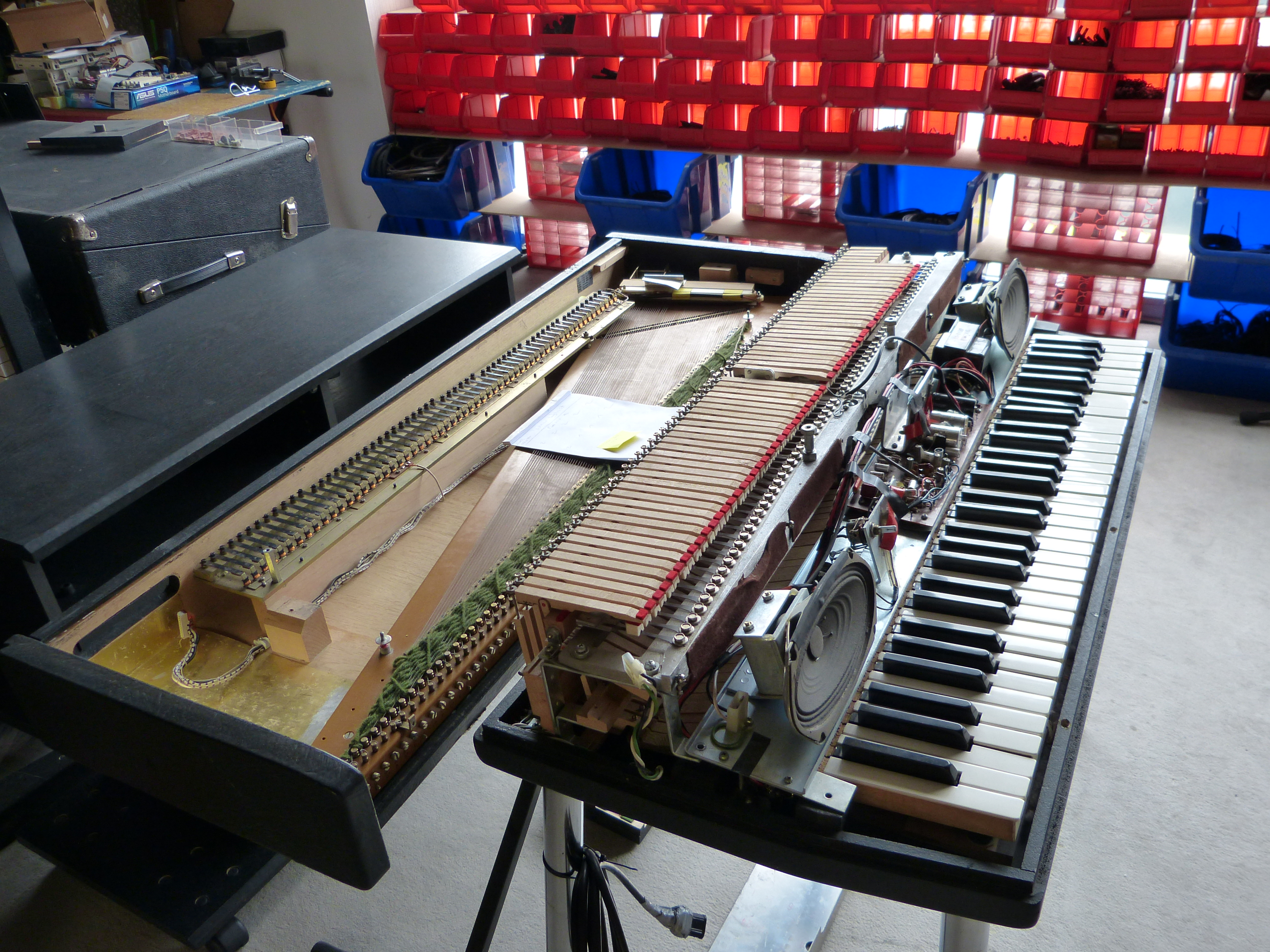
View of one of the museum workshops

In open workshops visitors can watch the museum technicians at work and have an insight into the inner workings of the instruments.

== See also ==
- List of music museums
