= Music by Ry Cooder =

Compilation album by Ry Cooder
- Released: July 11, 1995
- Recorded: 1980 – 1993
- Genre: Roots rock
- Length: 1:42:29
- Label: Warner Bros.
- Producer: Ry Cooder, Joachim Cooder

Ry Cooder compilations chronology
River Rescue – The Very Best of Ry Cooder (1994)	Music by Ry Cooder (1995)	The Ry Cooder Anthology: The UFO Has Landed (2008)

Music by Ry Cooder is a compilation album of Ry Cooder's soundtracks from movies released between 1980 and 1993. The movies and tracks on this album are:

- The Long Riders (1980) — The Long Riders, Archie's Funeral, Jesse James
- Southern Comfort (1981) — Theme from Southern Comfort, Swamp Walk, Canoes Upstream
- The Border (1982) — Across the Borderline, Highway 23, No Quiero, Maria
- Streets of Fire (1984) — Bomber Bash
- Paris, Texas (1984) — Paris, Texas; Cancion Mixteca; Houston in Two Seconds
- Alamo Bay (1985) — Theme from Alamo Bay, Klan Meeting
- Crossroads (1986) — See You in Hell, Blind Boy; Feelin' Bad Blues; Viola Lee Blues
- Blue City (1986) — Greenhouse, Nice Bike
- Johnny Handsome (1989) — I Like Your Eyes, Main Theme, Angola, Sunny's Tune, Cruising With Rafe, I Can't Walk This Time/The Prestige
- Trespass (1992) — King of the Street, East St. Louis, Goose and Lucky
- Geronimo: An American Legend (1993) — Goyakla Is Coming, Bound for Canaan (Sieber & Davis), Bound for Canaan (The 6th Cavalry), Train to Florida

== Track listing ==
Tracks are from the CD. All songs by Ry Cooder, except where noted.

Disc one
No.	Title	Length
1.	"Paris, Texas"	2:54
2.	"Theme from Southern Comfort"	3:47
3.	"Theme from Alamo Bay"	5:10
4.	"Across the Borderline" (Ry Cooder/John Hiatt/Jim Dickinson)	3:05
5.	"Highway 23"	1:57
6.	"Bomber Bash"	4:03
7.	"Greenhouse"	3:38
8.	"Nice Bike"	1:36
9.	"I Like Your Eyes"	2:25
10.	"Main Theme"	1:55
11.	"See You in Hell, Blind Boy"	2:10
12.	"Feelin' Bad Blues"	4:17
13.	"Swamp Walk"	1:05
14.	"Angola"	2:03
15.	"Viola Lee Blues" (Noah Lewis)	3:10
16.	"The Long Riders"	3:16
17.	"Archie's Funeral (Hold to God's Unchanging Hand)" (Traditional, arranged by Ry Cooder)	2:42
18.	"Jesse James" (Traditional, arranged by Ry Cooder)	5:06

Disc two
No.	Title	Length
1.	"King of the Street" (Ry Cooder/Jim Keltner/Robert Zemeckis/Bob Gale)	3:59
2.	"Sunny's Tune"	2:57
3.	"No Quiero" (Sam Samudio)	2:45
4.	"Cruising With Rafe" (Ry Cooder/Jim Keltner)	3:03
5.	"Klan Meeting"	2:49
6.	"I Can't Walk This Time/The Prestige"	6:50
7.	"East St. Louis"	2:03
8.	"Goose And Lucky"	1:40
9.	"Goyakla Is Coming" (Ry Cooder/Hoon-Hoortoo/R. Carlos Nakai)	1:11
10.	"Canoes Upstream"	1:09
11.	"Canción Mixteca" (Joseph Lopez Alavez)	4:17
12.	"Maria"	0:51
13.	"Bound for Canaan (Sieber & Davis)" (Ry Cooder/George Clinton)	1:29
14.	"Bound for Canaan (The 6th Cavalry)" (Ry Cooder/George Clinton)	1:36
15.	"Train to Florida" (Hoon-Hoortoo/R. Carlos Nakai/Jones Benally)	9:28
16.	"Houston In Two Seconds"	2:03
