= Live in San Francisco =

Live in San Francisco may refer to:

- Live in San Francisco (Ry Cooder and Corridos Famosos album)
- Live in San Francisco (Marilyn Crispell album)
- Live in San Francisco (John McLaughlin and Jimmy Herring album)
- Live in San Francisco (ProjeKct Four album)
- Live in San Francisco (Joe Satriani album)
- Live in San Francisco (Thee Oh Sees album)
- Live in San Francisco at the Palace of Fine Arts, an EP by Loreena McKennitt
- Live at San Francisco (Kate Miller-Heidke DVD)
- Archie Shepp Live in San Francisco (Archie Shepp album)
