= Mambo Sinuendo =

Studio album by Manuel Galban and Ry Cooder
- Released: January 28, 2003
- Genre: Latin Jazz; lounge; mambo
- Label: Nonesuch
- Producer: Ry Cooder

Manuel Galban and Ry Cooder chronology
The End of Violence (1997)	Mambo Sinuendo (2003)	Chávez Ravine (2005)

Professional ratings
Review scores
Source	Rating
AllMusic	4/5 stars
Rolling Stone	3/5 stars
The Village Voice	B−

Mambo Sinuendo is a studio album released by Cuban performer Manuel Galbán and producer Ry Cooder. The album was the first number-one album in the Billboard Top Latin Albums chart for Galbán and the second for Cooder (after Buena Vista Social Club in 1998), and won the Grammy Award for Best Pop Instrumental Album at the 46th Grammy Awards.

== Album history ==
About the recording of this album, Cooder notes that "Galbán and I felt that there was a sound that had not been explored in a Cuban electric-guitar band that could re-interpret the atmosphere of the 1950s with beauty, agility, and simplicity. We decided on two electrics, two drum sets, congas and bass: a sexteto that could swing like a big band and penetrate the mysteries of the classic tunes. This music is powerful, lyrical, and funny; what more could you ask? Mambo Sinuendo is Cuban soul and high-performance."

== Track listing ==
This information from Billboard.com.

1. "Drume Negrita" (Ernesto Grenet) — 5:00
2. "Monte Adentro" (Arsenio Rodríguez) — 2:53
3. "Los Twangueros" (Manuel Galbán, Ry Cooder) — 4:42
4. "Patricia" (Pérez Prado) — 3:29
5. "Caballo Viejo" (Simón Díaz) — 3:51
6. "Mambo Sinuendo" (Manuel Galbán, Ry Cooder, Joachim Cooder) — 2:31
7. "Bodas de Oro" (Electo Rosell "Chepin") — 4:40
8. "Échale Salsita" (Ignacio Piñeiro) — 4:27
9. "La Luna en Tu Mirada" (Luis Chanivecky) — 4:13
10. "Secret Love" (Paul Francis Webster, Sammy Fain) — 5:49
11. "Bolero Sonámbulo" (Manuel Galbán, Ry Cooder) — 4:31
12. "María la O" (Ernesto Lecuona) — 4:19

== Personnel ==
This information from AllMusic.

- Coro - Carla Commagere
- Music Coordinator - Demetrio Munez
- Design - Doyle Partners
- Composer - Electo Chepin Rosell
- Composer - Eliseo Grenet
- Composer - Ernesto Lecuona
- Guest Artist, Trumpet - Herb Alpert
- Composer - Ignacio Pineiro
- Assistant Engineer - Isel Martinez Rodriguez
- Engineer, Mastering, Mixing - Jerry Boys
- Drums - Jim Keltner
- Assistant Engineer - Jimmy Hoyson
- Composer, Drums - Joachim Cooder
- Coro - Juliette Commagere
- Guitar, Primary Artist - Manuel Galban
- Bata Drums - Maximino Duquesne Martinez
- Congas, Guest Artist - Miguel "Anga" Diaz
- Executive In Charge Of Music - Nick Gold
- Bass, Guest Artist - Orlando "Cachaito" Lopez
- Composer - Perez Prado
- Digital Editing - Rail Jon Rogut
- Electric Bass, Composer, Guitar, Steel Guitar, Organ, Electric Piano, Primary Artist, Producer, Tres, Vibraphone - Ry Cooder
- Composer - Sammy Fain
- Production Coordination - Sara Daoud
- Assistant Engineer - Simon Burwell
- Composer - Simon Diaz
- Mastering - Tom Leader
- Production Coordination - Zita M. "Toti" Morrina

== Charts ==
=== Weekly charts ===
Chart (2003)	Peak position
Australian Albums (ARIA)	79
Austrian Albums (Ö3 Austria)	32
Belgian Albums (Ultratop Flanders)	13
Belgian Albums (Ultratop Wallonia)	28
Dutch Albums (Album Top 100)	28
French Albums (SNEP)	81
German Albums (Offizielle Top 100)	29
Irish Albums (IRMA)	29
New Zealand Albums (RMNZ)	14
Norwegian Albums (VG-lista)	17
Scottish Albums (OCC)	46
Swedish Albums (Sverigetopplistan)	31
Swiss Albums (Schweizer Hitparade)	45
UK Albums (OCC)	40
US Billboard 200	52
US Top Latin Albums (Billboard)	1
US Latin Pop Albums (Billboard)	1
US World Albums (Billboard)	1

=== Year-end charts ===
Chart (2003)	Position
Belgian Albums (Ultratop Flanders)	58
