= Alamo Bay =

1985 US drama film directed by Louis Malle

- Theatrical release poster
- Directed by: Louis Malle
- Written by: Alice Arlen
- Produced by: Louis Malle
- Starring: Amy Madigan; Ed Harris; Ho Nguyen
- Cinematography: Curtis Clark
- Edited by: James Bruce
- Music by: Ry Cooder
- Production company: Delphi IV Productions
- Distributed by: Tri-Star Pictures
- Release date: April 3, 1985
- Running time: 98 minutes
- Country: United States
- Language: English
- Budget: $5 million
- Box office: $380,970

Alamo Bay is a 1985 American drama film about a Vietnam veteran who clashes with Vietnamese immigrants who move to his Texas bay hometown. The film was directed by Louis Malle, and stars Amy Madigan and Ed Harris. Future Texas A&M and Dallas Cowboys linebacker Dat Nguyen, who was age 9 at the time, has a small role as a Little League ballplayer. The film's soundtrack, composed and recorded by the artist Ry Cooder, was released as an album Music From the Motion Picture "Alamo Bay" in the same year, and its title track "Theme from Alamo Bay" can be also found on Music by Ry Cooder, a compilation album of Cooder's soundtracks from movies released between 1980 and 1993.

== Plot ==
A despondent Vietnam veteran in danger of losing his livelihood is pushed to the edge when he sees Vietnamese immigrants moving into the fishing industry in a Texas bay town. He teams up with other fishermen and the KKK to terrorize the Vietnamese fishermen in a campaign of violence and intimidation based on true historical events that took place in Texas in the late 1970s and early 1980s.

== Cast ==
- Amy Madigan as Glory Scheer
- Ed Harris as Shang Pierce
- Ho Nguyen as Dihn
- Donald Moffat as Wally Scheer
- Truyen V. Tran as Ben
- Rudy Young as Skinner
- Cynthia Carle as Honey
- Martin LaSalle as Luis
- William Frankfather as Mac
- Jay Patterson as Texas Voice #1
- Lucky Mosley as Ab Crankshaw
- Bill Thurman as Sheriff

== Production ==
Louis Malle first became aware of the violent confrontations between Vietnamese refugees and local fishermen in Texas after reading accounts in The New York Times. The film was a passion project for Malle as being an immigrant himself he felt very invested in the portrayal of the immigrant experience. Ross Milloy, who wrote the article that got Malle's attention provided the narrative basis for the film and was given an executive producer credit. Malle traveled to Texas with writer Alice Arlen to conduct research for the film and was so impressed with her first draft he personally financed pre-production himself and was prepared to self-finance the entire picture before TriStar Pictures provided the $5 million budget. The movie was filmed on location in Rockport-Fulton Beach, Texas where the actual violent incidents had taken place.

== Soundtrack ==
The music for the film was composed, arranged and performed by Ry Cooder and released as an album, Music From the Motion Picture "Alamo Bay", in 1985. The album's nine tracks were recorded at Ocean Way Studio in Hollywood with a core of credited musicians including drummer Jim Keltner, pianist Jim Dickinson and bassist Jorge Calderon. As four of the tracks were non-instrumental, the album's front cover listed the names of the vocalists: Cooder, David Hidalgo, Cesar Rosas of Los Lobos, Lee Ving, John Hiatt and Amy Madigan.

== Reception ==
In his review, Vincent Canby of The New York Times said "Like many other movies that have their origins in a general idea, which characters and their story, Alamo Bay is almost shamefully clumsy and superficial - it's manufactured 'art.' Watching it is an unhappy experience that never becomes illuminating."

== See also ==
- Vietnamese Fishermen's Association v. Knights of the Ku Klux Klan
