= Gert Prix =

Austrian musician, mathematics teacher

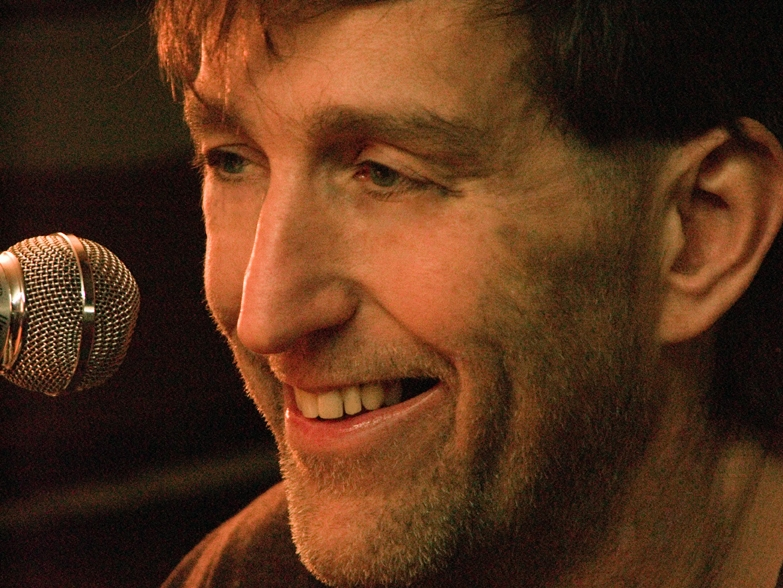

Gert Prix (* 25. September 1957 in Klagenfurt) is an Austrian musician, mathematics teacher, informatics teacher and engineer as well as the founder and the head of operations at the Eboardmuseum.

== Biography ==
Gert Prix was born in Klagenfurt, where he spent his childhood. His father Helmut was a businessman and inventor, his mother Felicitas was employee. In 1984 Prix married his wife Gerti, who gave birth to two children, Thomas and Denise.

== Musical career ==
Prix started his musical career at the age of 7 at the Carinthian State Conservatorium. When he was 15, he was a founding member of a boy group called “Sir Donald”, who went on to become the band “Three Tight”. In 1980 “Three Tight” won Peter Rapp’s ORF TV show “Die Große Chance” (The Great Chance). For more than 26 years the band kept their original format and performed at the lake Woerthersee with Gert Prix (keys), Heinz Köchl (guitar) and Rolf Holub (drums). Not least because of their entertaining stage show they were known as “the cult band of lake Woerthersee”, who created the legendary Woerthersee sound. They also performed in several Woerthersee-films of the German-Austrian Lisa Film company. In the year 2000 Heinz Köchl went his own separate way and the other two members formed the still existing “Beach Band”, a Beach Boys tribute band.

== Eboardmuseum ==
Since 1973 Gert Prix has been interested in technics and history of electronic musical instruments. In 1987 the Eboardmuseum, which is now considered to be the largest museum for electronic keyboard instruments worldwide, arose out of his rapidly growing collection of vintage instruments.
