= Live in San Francisco (Ry Cooder and Corridos Famosos album) =

Live album by Ry Cooder and Corridos Famosos
- Released: September 10, 2013
- Recorded: 2011 at the Great American Music Hall in San Francisco
- Genre: Blues, folk, Latin, pop rock, world
- Label: Nonesuch, Perro Verde
- Producer: Ry Cooder

Ry Cooder and Corridos Famosos chronology
Election Special (2012)	Live in San Francisco (2013)

Live in San Francisco is a collaborative live album by Ry Cooder and Corridos Famosos released in September 2013 by Nonesuch Records and Perro Verde. The album was recorded in 2011 at the Great American Music Hall in San Francisco, California. Cooder produced Live in San Francisco and recorded with members of Corridos Famosos, which included vocalists Juliette Commagere, Terry Evans, and Arnold McCuller, Joachim Cooder on drums, Robert Francis on bass, Flaco Jiménez on accordion, and the ten-piece Mexican brass band La Banda Juvenil. It was his first live album since Show Time (1977), which Cooder also recorded at the Great American Music Hall with Jiménez and Evans.

== Track listing ==
No.	Title	Writer(s)	Length
1.	"Crazy 'Bout an Automobile (Every Woman I Know)"	Billy "The Kid" Emerson	5:08
2.	"Why Don't You Try Me"	Snooky Young	5:28
3.	"Boomer's Story"	Traditional, Carson Robison	4:42
4.	"Lord Tell Me Why"	Cooder, Jim Keltner	6:18
5.	"Do Re Mi"	Woody Guthrie	5:43
6.	"School Is Out"	Gene Barge, Gary Anderson	5:02
7.	"Dark End of the Street"	Chips Moman, Dan Penn, Spooner Oldham	7:32
8.	"El Corrido de Jesse James"	Cooder	6:15
9.	"Wooly Bully"	Domingo Samudio	4:59
10.	"Volver Volver"	Fernando Z. Maldonado	6:30
11.	"Vigilante Man"	Guthrie	8:19
12.	"Goodnight Irene"	Lead Belly, John A. Lomax	7:06
