= Ry Cooder =

American musician (born 1947)

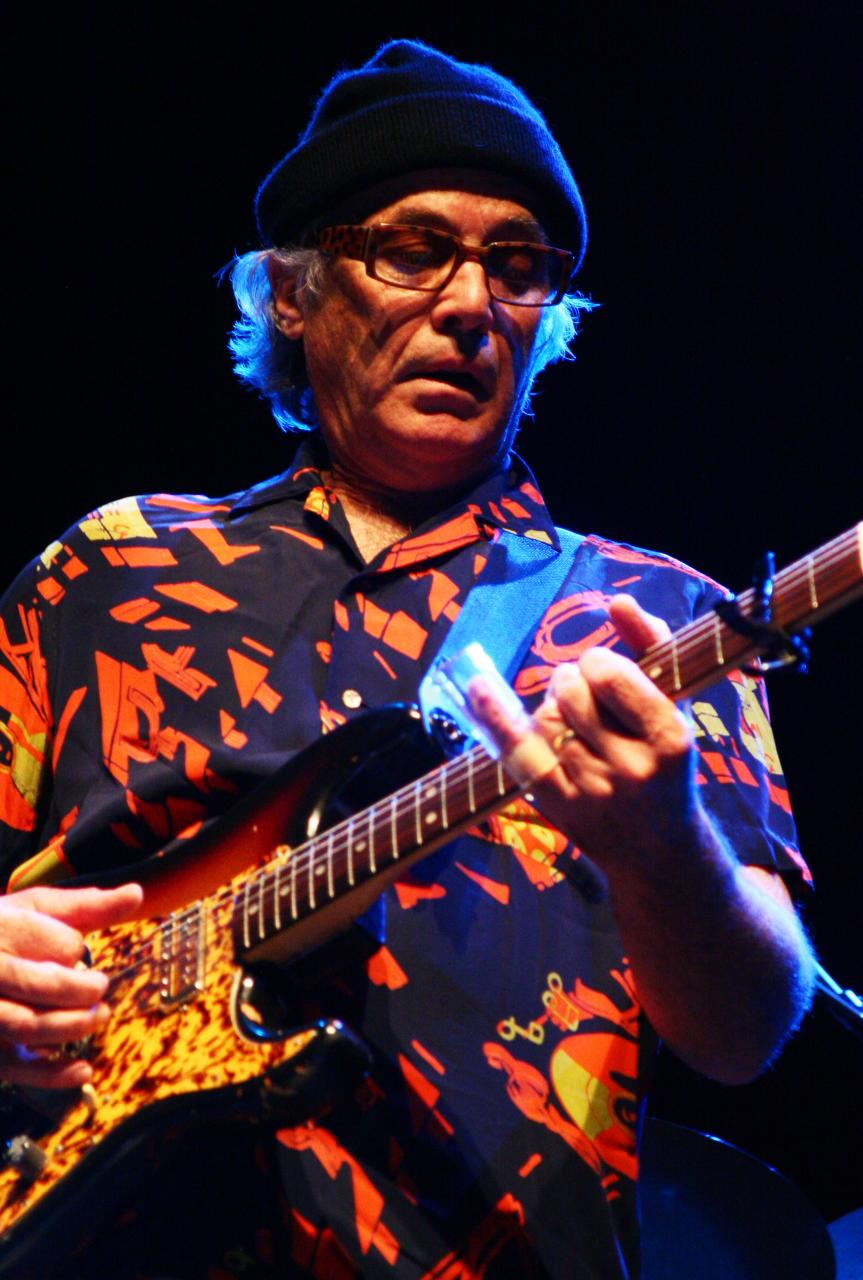
- Cooder performing in June 2009

Background information
- Born: Ryland Peter Cooder; March 15, 1947 (age 79); Los Angeles, California, U.S.
- Origin: Santa Monica, California, U.S.
- Genres: Americana; roots rock; folk; blues; Tex-Mex; country; gospel; world music
- Occupations: Musician; songwriter; film score composer; record producer; writer
- Instruments: Guitar; bass; mandolin; mandola; bouzouki; banjo
- Years active: 1967–present
- Labels: Warner Bros.; Nonesuch; Elektra; Rising Son; Reprise
- Website: rycooder.com

Ryland Peter Cooder (born March 15, 1947) is an American musician, songwriter, film score composer, record producer, and writer. He is a multi-instrumentalist but is best known for his slide guitar work, his interest in traditional music, and his collaborations with traditional musicians from many countries.

Cooder's solo work draws upon many genres. He has played with John Lee Hooker, Captain Beefheart, Taj Mahal, Gordon Lightfoot, Ali Farka Touré, Eric Clapton, the Rolling Stones, Van Morrison, Neil Young, Randy Newman, Linda Ronstadt, Vishwa Mohan Bhatt, David Lindley, the Chieftains, Warren Zevon, Manuel Galbán, the Doobie Brothers, Little Feat, and Carla Olson and the Textones (on record and film). He formed the band Little Village in 1991. He produced the album Buena Vista Social Club (1997), featuring traditional musicians in Cuba, which became a worldwide hit. Wim Wenders directed the documentary film of the same name (1999), which was nominated for an Academy Award in 2000.

Cooder was ranked at No. 8 on Rolling Stone magazine's 2003 list of "The 100 Greatest Guitarists of All Time", while a 2010 list by Gibson Guitar Corporation placed him at No. 32. In 2011, he published a collection of short stories called Los Angeles Stories.

== Early life ==
Ryland Peter Cooder was born in Los Angeles, California, on March 15, 1947, the son of Emma (née Casaroli) and Bill Cooder. His mother's family emigrated from Parma, Italy.

He was raised in Santa Monica, California, and graduated from Santa Monica High School in 1964. During the 1960s he briefly attended Reed College in Portland, Oregon. He began playing the guitar when he was three years old.

At the age of four, he accidentally stuck a knife in his left eye and has been wearing a glass eye ever since.

== Career ==
=== 1960s ===
Cooder performed as part of a pickup trio with Bill Monroe and Doc Watson, in which he played banjo. The trio was not successful but, reflecting his early exposure to the instrument, Cooder subsequently applied banjo tunings and the three finger roll to guitar.

Cooder first attracted attention playing with Captain Beefheart and his Magic Band, notably on the 1967 album Safe as Milk, after previously having worked with Taj Mahal and Ed Cassidy in the Rising Sons. At a vital "warm-up" performance at the Mt. Tamalpais Festival (June 10–11, 1967) shortly before the scheduled Monterey Pop Festival (June 16–18, 1967), the band began to play "Electricity" and Don Van Vliet froze, straightened his tie, then walked off the 10 ft (3.0 m) stage and landed on manager Bob Krasnow. He later claimed he had seen a girl in the audience turn into a fish, with bubbles coming from her mouth. This aborted any opportunity for breakthrough success at Monterey, for Cooder immediately decided he could no longer work with Van Vliet, effectively quitting both the event and the band on the spot. Cooder also played with Randy Newman, including on 12 Songs. Van Dyke Parks worked with Newman and Cooder during the 1960s. Parks arranged Cooder's "One Meatball", according to Parks' 1984 interview with Bob Claster.

Cooder was a session musician on various recording sessions with the Rolling Stones in 1968 and 1969, and his contributions appear on the albums Let It Bleed (Yank Rachell-style mandolin on "Love in Vain"), and Sticky Fingers, on which he contributed the slide guitar on "Sister Morphine". During this period, Cooder joined with Mick Jagger, Charlie Watts, Bill Wyman, and longtime Rolling Stones sideman Nicky Hopkins to record Jamming with Edward!. Cooder also played slide guitar for the 1970 film soundtrack Performance, which contained Jagger's first solo single, "Memo from Turner". The 1975 compilation album Metamorphosis features an uncredited Cooder contribution to Bill Wyman's "Downtown Suzie".

Cooder also collaborated with Lowell George of Little Feat, playing bottleneck guitar on the original version of "Willin'". He also played bottleneck guitar and mandolin on two tracks on the Gordon Lightfoot album Sit Down Young Stranger (later re-titled If You Could Read My Mind), recorded in late 1969 and released in early 1970.

=== 1970s ===
Throughout the 1970s, Cooder released a series of Warner Bros. Records albums that showcased his guitar work, initially on the Reprise Records label, before being reassigned to the main Warners label along with many of Reprise's artists when the company retired the imprint. Cooder explored bygone musical genres and found old-time recordings which he then personalized and updated. Thus, on his breakthrough album, Into the Purple Valley, he chose unusual instrumentations and arrangements of blues, gospel, calypso, and country songs (giving a tempo change to the cowboy ballad "Billy the Kid"). The album opened with the song "How Can You Keep on Moving (Unless You Migrate Too)" by Agnes "Sis" Cunningham about the Okies who were not welcomed when they migrated west to escape the Dust Bowl in the 1930s – to which Cooder gave a rousing-yet-satirical march accompaniment. In 1970 he collaborated with Ron Nagle and performed on his Bad Rice album released on Warner Brothers. On September 12, 1970, Cooder was part of the backing band for the “Musical Tribute to Woody Guthrie” concert at the Hollywood Bowl, where he played bottleneck guitar and mandolin.

Cooder's later 1970s albums (with the exception of Jazz, which explored ragtime/vaudeville) do not fall under a single genre description, but his self-titled first album could be described as blues; Into the Purple Valley, Boomer's Story, and Paradise and Lunch as folk and blues; Chicken Skin Music and Showtime as a mix of Tex-Mex and Hawaiian; Bop Till You Drop as 1950s R&B; and Borderline and Get Rhythm as rock-based. His 1979 album Bop Till You Drop was the first popular music album released that was recorded digitally, using the early 3M digital mastering recorder. It yielded his biggest hit, an R&B cover version of Elvis Presley's 1960s recording "Little Sister".

Cooder is credited on Van Morrison's 1979 album Into the Music, for slide guitar on the song "Full Force Gale". He also played guitar on Judy Collins' 1970 concert tour, and is featured on Living, the 1971 live album recorded during that tour. He also learned from and performed with Gabby Pahinui and "Atta" Isaacs in Hawaii during the Hawaiian Renaissance of the early 1970s. He is also credited for guitars on several 1971 recordings by Nancy Sinatra that were produced by Andy Wickman and Lenny Waronker – "Is Anybody Goin' To San Antone", "Hook & Ladder", and "Glory Road". Cooder is credited as a mandolin player on Gordon Lightfoot's Don Quixote album in 1972.

=== 1980s ===
Cooder has worked as a studio musician and has also scored many film soundtracks including the Wim Wenders film Paris, Texas (1984). Cooder based this soundtrack and title song "Paris, Texas" on Blind Willie Johnson's "Dark Was the Night (Cold Was the Ground)", which he described as "the most soulful, transcendent piece in all American music". Musician Dave Grohl has declared Cooder's score for Paris, Texas one of his favorite albums. In 2018 Cooder told BBC Radio 4 listeners: "[Wenders] did a very good job at capturing the ambiance out there in the desert, just letting the microphones and the nagra machine roll and get tones and sound from the desert itself, which I discovered was E♭, was in the key of E♭ – that's the wind, you know, was nice. So we tuned everything to E♭."

"Dark Was the Night (Cold Was the Ground)" was also the basis for Cooder's song "Powis Square" for the movie Performance. His other film work includes Walter Hill's The Long Riders (1980), Southern Comfort (1981), Streets of Fire (1984), Brewster's Millions (1985), Johnny Handsome, Last Man Standing (1996), Hill's Trespass (1992) and Mike Nichols' Primary Colors (1998). Cooder, along with Arlen Roth, dubbed all slide and regular blues guitar parts in the 1986 film Crossroads, a take on blues legend Robert Johnson. In 1988, Cooder produced the album by his longtime backing vocalists Bobby King and Terry Evans on Rounder Records titled Live and Let Live. He contributed his slide guitar work to every track. He also plays extensively on their 1990 self-produced Rounder release Rhythm, Blues, Soul & Grooves. Cooder's music also appeared on two episodes of the television program Tales From the Crypt: "The Man Who Was Death" and "The Thing From the Grave".

In 1984, Cooder played on two songs on the debut album by Carla Olson & the Textones, Midnight Mission – "Carla's Number One is to Survive" and the previously unreleased Bob Dylan song "Clean Cut Kid". Shortly thereafter he was writing and recording the music for the film Blue City and asked the band to appear in the film performing. (He took them to the studio and produced "You Can Run" which he also played on.)

In 1985, Cooder was a guest artist on the song "Rough Edges" from Kim Carnes' album Barking at Airplanes. Kim named her son Ry as a tribute to Ry Cooder.

Also in 1988, Cooder produced and featured in the Les Blank-directed concert documentary film Ry Cooder & The Moula Banda Rhythm Aces: Let's Have a Ball where he plays in collaboration with a selection of musicians famous in their various musical fields. The following year, he played a janitor in the Jim Henson series The Ghost of Faffner Hall, in the episode "Music Is More Than Technique".

=== 1990s ===
In the early 1990s, Cooder collaborated on two world music "crossover" albums, which blended the traditional American musical genres that Cooder has championed throughout his career with the contemporary improvised music of India and Africa. For A Meeting by the River (1993), which also featured his son Joachim Cooder on percussion, he teamed with Hindustani classical musician V.M. Bhatt, a virtuoso of the Mohan Veena (a modified 20-string archtop guitar of Bhatt's own invention) and Sukhvinder Singh Namdhari also known as Pinky Tabla Player.

In 1993 he teamed up with multi-instrumentalist Ali Farka Touré from Mali to record the album Talking Timbuktu, which he also produced. The album, released in 1994, also featured longtime Cooder collaborator Jim Keltner on drums, veteran blues guitarist Clarence "Gatemouth" Brown, jazz bassist John Patitucci and African percussionists and musicians including Hamma Sankare and Oumar Toure. Both albums won the Grammy Award for Best World Music Album in 1994 and 1995 respectively. Cooder also worked with Tuvan throat singers for the score to the 1993 film Geronimo: An American Legend.

In 1995 he performed in The Wizard of Oz in Concert: Dreams Come True, a musical performance of the popular story at the Lincoln Center in New York to benefit the Children's Defense Fund. The performance was originally broadcast on both TBS and TNT. It was issued on CD and video in 1996.

In the late 1990s Cooder played a significant role in the increased appreciation of traditional Cuban music, due to his collaboration as producer of the Buena Vista Social Club (1997) recording, which became a worldwide hit and revived the careers of some of the greatest surviving exponents of 20th century Cuban music. Wim Wenders, who had previously directed 1984's Paris, Texas, directed a documentary film of the musicians involved, Buena Vista Social Club (1999), which was nominated for an Academy Award in 2000. The enterprise cost him a $25,000 fine for violating the United States embargo against Cuba.

=== 2000s ===
Cooder's 2005 album Chávez Ravine was touted by his record label as being "a post-World War II-era American narrative of 'cool cats', radios, UFO sightings, J. Edgar Hoover, red scares, and baseball". The record is a tribute to the long-gone Los Angeles Latino enclave known as Chávez Ravine. Using real and imagined historical characters, Cooder and friends created an album that recollects various aspects of the poor but vibrant hillside Chicano community that no longer exists. Cooder says, "Here is some music for a place you don't know, up a road you don't go. Chávez Ravine, where the sidewalk ends." Drawing from the various musical strains of Los Angeles, including conjunto, R&B, Latin pop, and jazz, Cooder and friends conjure the ghosts of Chávez Ravine and Los Angeles at mid-century. On this fifteen-track album, sung in Spanish and English, Cooder is joined by East L.A. legends like Chicano music patriarch Lalo Guerrero, Pachuco boogie king Don Tosti, Thee Midniters front man Little Willie G, and Ersi Arvizu, of The Sisters and El Chicano.

Cooder's next record was released in 2007. Entitled My Name Is Buddy, it tells the story of Buddy Red Cat, who travels and sees the world in the company of his like-minded friends, Lefty Mouse and Rev. Tom Toad. The entire recording is a parable of the working class progressivism of the first half of the American twentieth century, and even has a song featuring executed unionist Joe Hill. My Name Is Buddy was accompanied by a booklet featuring a story and illustration (by Vincent Valdez) for each track, providing additional context to Buddy's adventures.

Cooder produced and performed on an album for Mavis Staples entitled We'll Never Turn Back, which was released on April 24, 2007. The concept album focused on Gospel songs of the civil rights movement and also included two new original songs by Cooder.

Cooder's album I, Flathead was released on June 24, 2008. It is the completion of his California trilogy. Based on the drag racing culture of the early 1960s, the album is set on the desert salt flats in southern California. The disc was also released as a deluxe edition with stories written by Cooder to accompany the music.

In late 2009, Cooder toured Japan, New Zealand, and Australia with Nick Lowe, performing some of Lowe's songs and a selection of Cooder's own material, mainly from the 1970s. Joaquim Cooder (Ry's son) provided percussion, and Juliette Commagere and Alex Lilly contributed backing vocals.

The song "Diaraby", which Cooder recorded with Ali Farka Touré, is used as the theme to The World's Geo Quiz. The World is a radio show distributed by Public Radio International.

In 2009, Cooder performed in The People Speak, a documentary feature film that uses dramatic and musical performances of the letters, diaries, and speeches of everyday Americans, based on historian Howard Zinn's A People's History of the United States. Cooder performed with Bob Dylan and Van Dyke Parks on the documentary broadcast on December 13, 2009, on the History Channel. They played "Do Re Mi" and reportedly a couple of other Guthrie songs that were excluded from the final edit. He also traveled with the band Los Tigres del Norte and recorded the 2010 album San Patricio with the Chieftains, Lila Downs, Liam Neeson, Linda Ronstadt, Van Dyke Parks, Los Cenzontles, and Los Tigres.

=== 2010s ===
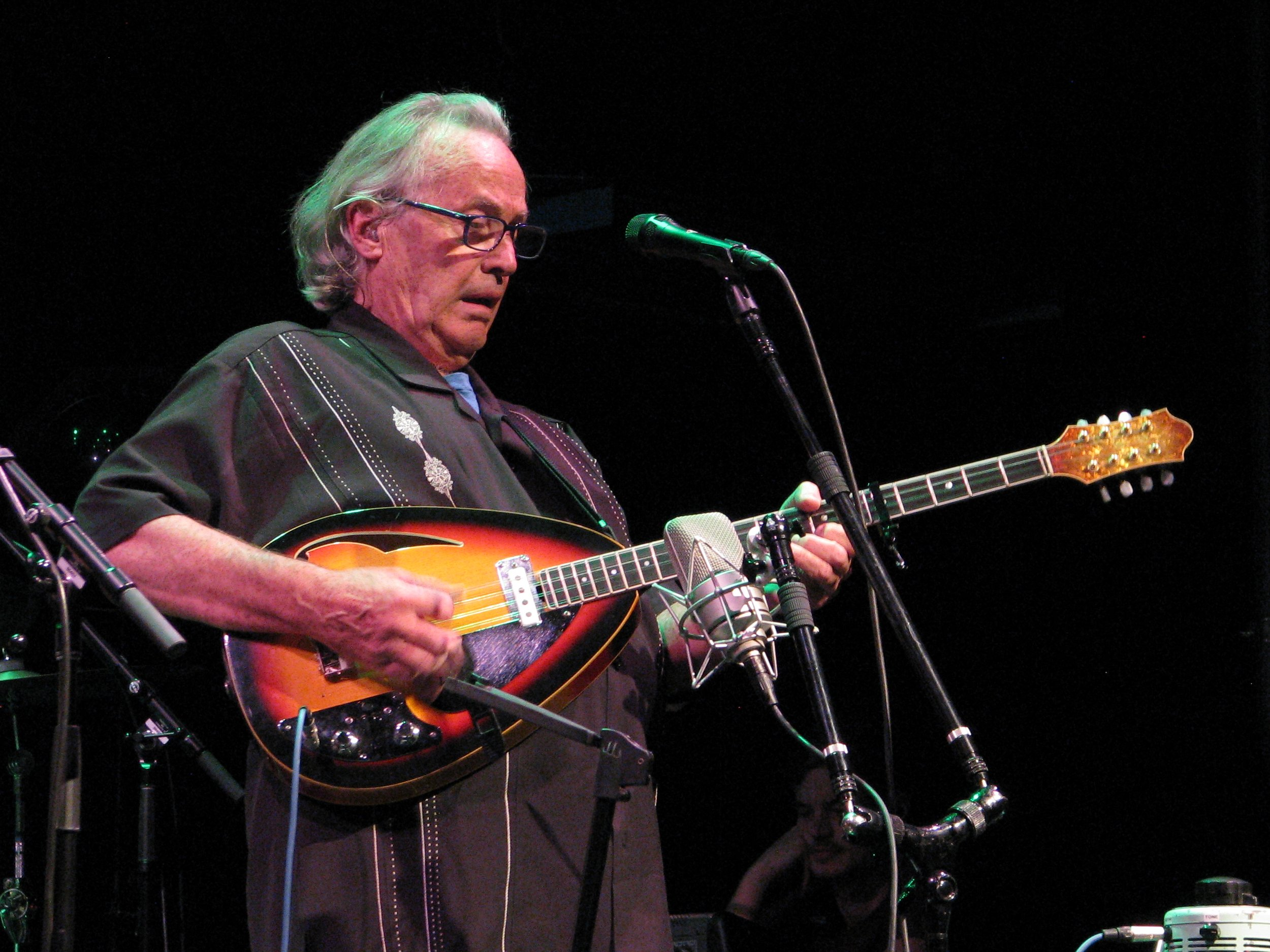
Cooder playing the electric bouzouki in August 2015

In June 2010, responding to the passage of Arizona SB 1070, he released the single "Quicksand", which tells the story of Mexicans attempting to emigrate to Arizona through the desert. Cooder's critically acclaimed new album Pull Up Some Dust and Sit Down, released on August 30, 2011, contains politically charged songs such as "No Banker Left Behind" which was inspired by a Robert Scheer column.

In 2011, he published a collection of short stories called Los Angeles Stories, written about people living in Los Angeles in the 1940s and 1950s. The book's characters are mostly talented or skilled, clever or hardworking people living in humble circumstances. With story titles such as "La vida es un sueño" and "Kill me, por favor", the collection's stories often have a Hispanic theme, and the book deals partially with Latinos living in Los Angeles during this time.

An American Songwriter article in 2012 suggested that Cooder's recent string of solo albums have often taken on an allegorical, sociopolitical bent. Music journalist Evan Schlansky said that "Cooder's latest effort, Election Special (released August 21, 2012, on Nonesuch/Perro Verde) doesn't mince words. It's designed to send a message to the 'deacons in the High Church of the Next Dollar'". The album was composed in support of the Democratic Party and President Barack Obama in the 2012 election.

On September 10, 2013, Cooder released Live in San Francisco, featuring the Corridos Famosos band, including Joachim Cooder on drums; Robert Francis on bass; vocalists Terry Evans, Arnold McCuller, and Juliette Commagere; Flaco Jiménez on accordion; and the Mexican brass band La Banda Juvenil. The album was recorded during a two-night run at Great American Music Hall in San Francisco, August 31 and September 1, 2011. It is Cooder's first official live recording since Show Time in 1977 (which had also been recorded at Great American Music Hall).

In 2015, Cooder toured with Ricky Skaggs, Sharon White and other members of the Whites with their "Music for The Good People" show. The tour continued through into 2016.

On May 11, 2018, Cooder released his first solo album in six years entitled The Prodigal Son. The subsequent tour featured opening performances by his son, Joachim, who also accompanied Cooder on drums.

In 2019, he and Rosanne Cash briefly toured together as a tribute to Johnny Cash called "Cooder and Cash on Cash".

=== 2020s ===
On April 22, 2022, Cooder and Taj Mahal released Get on Board: The Songs of Sonny Terry & Brownie McGhee.

== Awards ==
- 1988 Grammy Award (Best Recording for Children) – Pecos Bill, producer (Rabbit Ears Productions)
- 1993 Grammy Award (Best World Music Album) – A Meeting by the River (with Pt. Vishwa Mohan Bhatt)
- 1994 Grammy Award (Best World Music Album) – Talking Timbuktu with Ali Farka Toure
- 1997 Grammy Award (Best Tropical Latin Performance) – Buena Vista Social Club
- 2003 Grammy Award (Best Pop Instrumental Album) – Mambo Sinuendo with Manuel Galbán
- 2003 Grammy Award (Best Traditional Tropical Latin Album) – Buenos Hermanos, producer (Ibrahim Ferrer, artist)
- 2000 – Honorary doctorate from Queen's University, Canada
- 2001 – Honorary doctorate from the California Institute of the Arts
- 2017 – BBC Radio 2 Folk Awards – Lifetime Achievement Award
- 2018 – Montreal International Jazz Festival – Spirit Award

== Discography ==
=== Solo albums ===
- Ry Cooder (December 1970)
- Into the Purple Valley (February 1972)
- Boomer's Story (November 1972)
- Paradise and Lunch (May 1974)
- Chicken Skin Music (October 1976)
- Show Time (January 1977)
- Jazz (June 1978)
- Bop Till You Drop (August 1979)
- Borderline (October 1980)
- The Slide Area (April 1982)
- Get Rhythm (November 1987)
- Chávez Ravine (May 2005)
- My Name Is Buddy (March 2007)
- I, Flathead (June 2008)
- Pull Up Some Dust and Sit Down (August 2011)
- Election Special (August 2012)
- The Prodigal Son (May 2018)

=== Compilations ===
- Why Don't You Try Me Tonight (1986)
- River Rescue – The Very Best of Ry Cooder (1994)
- Music by Ry Cooder (1995) (two-disc set of film music)
- The Ry Cooder Anthology: The UFO Has Landed (October 2008)

=== Singles ===
- "He'll Have to Go" / "The Bourgeouis Blues" (1977; Reprise Records)
- "Little Sister" / "Down In Hollywood" (1979; Warner Records)
- "Crazy 'Bout an Automobile (Every Woman I Know)" Recorded live, October 25, 1980, at Victoria Apollo, London / "If Walls Could Talk" Recorded live, February 26, 1981, at Old Waldorf, San Francisco, California / "The Very Thing That Makes You Rich (Makes Me Poor)" Recorded live, February 26, 1981, at Old Waldorf, San Francisco, California / "Look at Granny Run Run" Recorded live, February 26, 1981, at Old Waldorf, San Francisco, California (1981; Warner Records)
- "Gypsy Woman"/ "Alimony" (1982; Nonesuch Records)
- "Get Rhythm"/ "Get Your Lies Straight" / "Down in Hollywood" (1988)
- "Come Down" / "Get Rhythm" / "Little Sister" (1994)
- "Quicksand" (June 2010)

=== Collaborations ===
- Tanyet (1967) (with The Ceyleib People)
- Jamming with Edward! (Let It Bleed sessions, 1969, with Nicky Hopkins, Mick Jagger, Bill Wyman, Charlie Watts) (1972)
- "GABBY PAHINUI HAWAIIAN BAND vol.1" Gaby Pahinui and Ry Cooder (1975)
- "GABBY PAHINUI HAWAIIAN BAND vol.2" Gaby Pahinui and Ry Cooder (1977)
- Ry Cooder and the Moula Banda Rhythm Aces: Let's Have a Ball (1988)
- Rising Sons featuring Taj Mahal and Ry Cooder with Rising Sons (recorded 1965/66, released 1992)
- Little Village (1992)
- A Meeting by the River (1993) (with Vishwa Mohan Bhatt)
- Talking Timbuktu (1994) (with Ali Farka Touré)
- Ry Cooder/Lindley Family: Live At The Vienna Opera House (1995) with Joachim Cooder, David Lindley and Rosanne Lindley
- The Long Black Veil (1995) (with the Chieftains)
- Buena Vista Social Club (September 1997)
- Buena Vista Social Club Presents Ibrahim Ferrer (1999) (with Ibrahim Ferrer)
- Hollow Bamboo with Jon Hassell and Ronu Majumdar (bansuri) (2000)
- Mambo Sinuendo (January 2003) (with Manuel Galbán)
- Buenos Hermanos (2003) (with Ibrahim Ferrer)
- Mi Sueño (2007) (with Ibrahim Ferrer, production of 'Melodía del río' only)
- Buena Vista Social Club at Carnegie Hall (2008) (with Buena Vista Social Club)
- San Patricio (March 2010) (with the Chieftains)
- Live in San Francisco (September 2013) (with Corridos Famosos)
- Lost and Found (March 2015) (with Buena Vista Social Club, production of 'Macusa' and 'Lágrimas Negras' only)
- Get On Board (May 2022) (with Taj Mahal)

=== Soundtracks ===
- Performance (1970, three of 13 tracks)
- The Long Riders (June 1980)
- Southern Comfort (1981)
- The Border (1982)
- Streets of Fire (1984)
- Paris, Texas (February 1985)
- Alamo Bay (August 1985)
- Blue City (July 1986)
- Crossroads (July 1986)
- Cocktail (1988, one track: "All Shook Up")
- Johnny Handsome (October 1989)
- Trespass (January 1993)
- Geronimo: An American Legend (1993)
- Last Man Standing (1996)
- The End of Violence (1997)
- Primary Colors (1998)
- My Blueberry Nights (2007; three out of 14 tracks)

=== As session musician ===
- Midnight Ride (1966) with Paul Revere & the Raiders
- Safe as Milk (1967) with Captain Beefheart
- Taj Mahal (1968) with Taj Mahal
- Gentle Soul (1968) with The Gentle Soul
- Neil Young (1968) with Neil Young
- Head (1968) with the Monkees
- Departure (1969) with Pat Boone
- Permanent Damage (1969) with the GTOs
- Hard 'N' Heavy (with Marshmallow) (1969) with Paul Revere & the Raiders
- Border Town (1969) with Fusion
- Longbranch Pennywhistle (1969) with Longbranch Pennywhistle
- Let It Bleed (1969) with the Rolling Stones
- "Something Better / Sister Morphine" (1969) with Marianne Faithfull
- Running Down the Road (1969) with Arlo Guthrie
- 12 Songs (1970) with Randy Newman
- The Candlestickmaker (1970) with Ron Elliott
- Washington County (1970) with Arlo Guthrie
- Stained Glass Morning (1970) with Scott McKenzie
- Sit Down Young Stranger (1970) with Gordon Lightfoot
- Crazy Horse (1971)
- Stories (1971) with David Blue
- Sticky Fingers (1971) with the Rolling Stones
- Little Feat (1971) with Little Feat
- She Used to Wanna Be a Ballerina (1971) with Buffy Sainte-Marie
- Living (1971) with Judy Collins
- Rita Coolidge (1971) with Rita Coolidge
- Petaluma (1972) with Norman Greenbaum
- Salty (1972) with Alex Richman
- Sail Away (1972) with Randy Newman
- Stories We Could Tell (1972) with the Everly Brothers
- Don Quixote (1972) with Gordon Lightfoot
- Hobo's Lullaby (1972) with Arlo Guthrie
- Rod Taylor (1973) with Rod Taylor
- Last of the Brooklyn Cowboys (1973) with Arlo Guthrie
- The Second Annual Farewell Reunion (1973) with Mike Seeger
- Maria Muldaur (1973) with Maria Muldaur
- Good Old Boys (1974) with Randy Newman
- Arlo Guthrie (1974) with Arlo Guthrie
- Stampede (1975) with the Doobie Brothers
- Little Criminals (1977) with Randy Newman
- Blue Collar (1978) (soundtrack)
- Into the Music (1979) with Van Morrison
- No Nukes: The Muse Concerts for a Non-Nuclear Future (1979)
- Money and Cigarettes (1983) with Eric Clapton
- Midnight Mission (1984) Carla Olson and the Textones
- Bring the Family (1987) with John Hiatt
- Trio (1987) with Dolly Parton, Linda Ronstadt and Emmylou Harris
- Live and Let Live! (1988) with Bobby King and Terry Evans
- Party of One (1990) Nick Lowe
- Mr. Lucky (1991) with John Lee Hooker
- Warm Your Heart (1991) Aaron Neville
- Peace to the Neighborhood (1992) Pops Staples
- Father Father (1994) Pops Staples
- King Cake Party (1994) with the Zydeco Party Band
- The Tractors (1994) with the Tractors
- A Toda Cuba le Gusta (1997) with the Afro-Cuban All Stars
- Good Dog, Happy Man (1999) with Bill Frisell
- Sublime Ilusión (1999) with Eliades Ochoa
- Chanchullo (2000) with Rubén González
- October Road (2002) with James Taylor
- The Wind (2003) with Warren Zevon
- Enjoy Every Sandwich: The Songs of Warren Zevon (2004)
- Delta Time (2012) with Hans Theessink and Terry Evans
- Fuchsia Machu Picchu (2018) with Joachim Cooder

== Films ==
- Ry Cooder and the Moula Banda Rhythm Aces: at The Catalyst, Santa Cruz, California; March 25, 1987 (1987), Director: Les Blank, Producer: Ry Cooder, Flower Films and Warner Brothers. Records.

== Written works ==
- Los Angeles Stories, City Lights Publishers (2011)

Awards
Preceded by Kenny Vaughan	AMA Lifetime Achievement Award for Instrumentalist; 2007	Succeeded by Larry Campbell
