= Live and Let Live! =

Studio album by Bobby King and Terry Evans
- Released: 1988
- Genre: Blues, soul, R&B
- Label: Rounder
- Producer: Ry Cooder

Bobby King and Terry Evans chronology
Live and Let Live! (1988)	Rhythm, Blues, Soul & Grooves (1990)

Live and Let Live! is an album by the American musicians Bobby King and Terry Evans, released in 1988. The pair had served as backing vocalists in Ry Cooder's band. The duo supported the album with a UK tour with Cooder.

== Production ==
The album was produced by Cooder. King and Evans were backed by Cooder on bottleneck guitar, as well as most of Cooder's band: Jim Keltner on drums, Jim Dickinson and Spooner Oldham on piano, and Jorge Calderón and Daryl Johnson on bass. A third Cooder vocalist, Willie Green, sang on two tracks. "At the Dark End of the Street" is a cover of the James Carr song. "Just a Little Bit" is a version of the Roscoe Gordon song.

== Critical reception ==
Professional ratings
Review scores
Source	Rating
All Music Guide to the Blues	5/5 stars
The Encyclopedia of Popular Music	3/5 stars
The Grove Press Guide to the Blues on CD	1.5/5 stars
MusicHound Blues: The Essential Album Guide	4.5/5 stars
Oakland Tribune	4/4 stars
The Philadelphia Inquirer	3/4 stars
Rolling Stone	3.5/5 stars
Times Colonist	4/5 stars

The San Francisco Chronicle concluded, "The album is an utter gem, not likely to be heard on hit radio, but certain to delight discriminating listeners with its frolic and fervor." The Philadelphia Inquirer noted the "loose, slap-happy vocals that sound as though they're having too much fun to worry about premeditated arrangements." USA Today opined that "Seeing Is Believing" "is like a great Little Feat track".

The St. Petersburg Times said, "King's high, sanctified tenor meshes wonderfully with Evan's low, sand-and-gravel growl." The Independent noted that "King and Evans are better at lounging about than jumping and hollering". The Chicago Tribune called Live and Let Live! "one of the finest soul albums of the year." The StarPhoenix labeled it "one of the most exciting blues and R&B collections in a long time."

== Track listing ==
No.	Title	Length
1.	"Just a Little Bit"
2.	"Bald Head"
3.	"Seeing Is Believing"
4.	"Let Love Begin"
5.	"Saturday Night"
6.	"Let Me Go Back to the Country"
7.	"Got to Keep Moving"
8.	"Live and Let Live"
9.	"At the Dark End of the Street"
