= Election Special =

Studio album by Ry Cooder
- Released: August 16, 2012
- Recorded: 2011–12
- Studios: Drive-By (North Hollywood); Wireland (Chatsworth)
- Genres: American roots; blues rock
- Length: 38:31
- Labels: Perro Verde; Nonesuch
- Producer: Ry Cooder

Ry Cooder chronology
Pull Up Some Dust and Sit Down (2011)	Election Special (2012)	The Prodigal Son (2018)

Election Special is the 15th studio album by American singer-songwriter and multi-instrumentalist Ry Cooder. It was released on August 16, 2012, by Perro Verde and Nonesuch Records. Cooder recorded and produced the album mostly at Drive-By Studios in North Hollywood, performing all of the instrumentation, including bass, guitar, and mandolin, with the exception of drums, which were played by his son Joachim.

Based in American roots and blues rock music, Election Special features upbeat melodies, simple instrumentation, and sparse arrangements as a backdrop for protest songs that continue the topical storylines of Cooder's previous album Pull Up Some Dust and Sit Down (2011). Displeased with the Republican Party and its financial supporters, Cooder wanted to write an album that would address listeners during the United States presidential election of 2012, which he believed would be a critical event in the country's history. A deeply political album, Election Special expands on its predecessor's socio-political musings and current event topics with forthright, satirical lyrics and song-form vignettes. Cooder's songwriting also exhibits liberal and populist sentiments, while drawing on older musical sources such as broadside ballads and country blues.

Released one week before the 2012 Republican National Convention, Election Special was met with generally positive reviews from critics, who applauded its topical protest songs and Cooder's musicianship. The album peaked at number 164 on the US Billboard 200, but charted significantly higher in other countries. Cooder did not tour in promotion of the album, citing a lost interest in both playing large concert venues and the commercial aspect of releasing records.

== Background ==
In 2011, Cooder recorded Pull Up Some Dust and Sit Down after being inspired by a headline about bankers and other affluent people profiting from bank bailouts and the resulting recession during the late-2000s. Released in August to critical acclaim, it showcased Cooder's return to his early work's musical style and told topical stories about political and social corruption, various economic victims, and an emerging class war. With the album finished, Cooder had developed a penchant for writing such songs and wanted to continue writing more storyline-inspired songs. A month after the album's release, Cooder had his first short-story collection, Los Angeles Stories, published by City Lights Bookstore. In June 2012, he joined Time political columnist Joe Klein on the latter's road trip across the United States, speaking out to people in towns about the state of the nation and its forthcoming presidential election in 2012.

== Writing and recording ==
I have to find little storylines. I have to have something I can play and sing, in some style or some instrumental point of view – a country tune or a blues tune – updating these things that I grew up listening to ... it seemed that the more I did it, the better I got at it, like anything. It's an acting job. You put yourself into the spirit of the thing, the character of the thing.

— Ry Cooder

With Election Special, Cooder wanted to write an album with direct lyrics and encourage urgency in listeners during the US presidential election of 2012. He felt that the election season was "the time of decision in this country ... the most critical time in the history of the country". When asked about concerns over "preaching to the choir", Cooder said in an interview for the Los Angeles Times, "I thought I should have a record that says, 'This here record is for you during election time.' Rather than be vague and poetic, let's just call this what it is. That way I may get people's attention. That's the idea." Cooder drew on music he grew up listening to such as Depression-era songs and sought to appropriate contemporary subject matter to them. When writing the album, he also touched on the Occupy movement, which he felt optimistic about, saying that "There's a sign of something. Those people are having conversations, and the conversations become issues and the issues become talked about. Pretty soon, the rest of the world picks up on it, even the politicians."

Cooder's displeasure with the Republican Party and its financial supporters, particularly the Koch Brothers, also inspired his songwriting. He found the party to be "insanely dangerous" to Barack Obama's presidency and the US, and said of them in an interview for The Guardian, "in case anybody thinks Michele Bachmann or Sarah Palin are clowns because they misspeak or don't know their history or they say silly things: that's just an act, and it's a useful act. Everything is a distraction from the core truths which are, first of all, that corporations have taken over the country." He viewed that his songs for the album provide a more convenient alternative for citizens who do not research politicians, saying that "I don't write books and give speeches but with a four-minute song you can use allegory and other means to suggest a different point of view. It's like looking around the corner, and that's what songs are good at sometimes. They hit you with a new thought – assuming that people will listen."

Cooder recorded most of Election Special at Drive-By Studios, the living room of engineer Martin Pradler's house in North Hollywood. Sessions also took place at Wireland Studios in Chatsworth, California. Pradler later mixed and mastered the album at both recording locations. The album was produced entirely by Cooder. He performed most of the album himself, playing bass, guitar, and mandolin. His son Joachim contributed on drums, and session musician Arnold McCuller sung harmony vocals on the song "Take Your Hands off It". At Drive-By Studios, Cooder recorded songs in a series of unrehearsed, single-take performances, which he felt helped him channel the songs' respective characters more efficiently. He later said of his approach to developing the songs, "The way I think these songs can work is if you don't ponder over it too hard, because the tunes wanna have a spontaneous-combustion effect. What I want to do is get a certain attitude in the voice, and I can only do that once. By take two, I'm startin' to think about it. By take three, I'm startin' to map it out – it's gone. It's spoiled, y'see? So I need to get through this fast." He first recorded the song "The Wall Street Part of Town" in November 2011. On June 7, 2012, the album's release was announced for a date in August, intended to be a week before the 2012 Republican National Convention.

== Music and themes ==
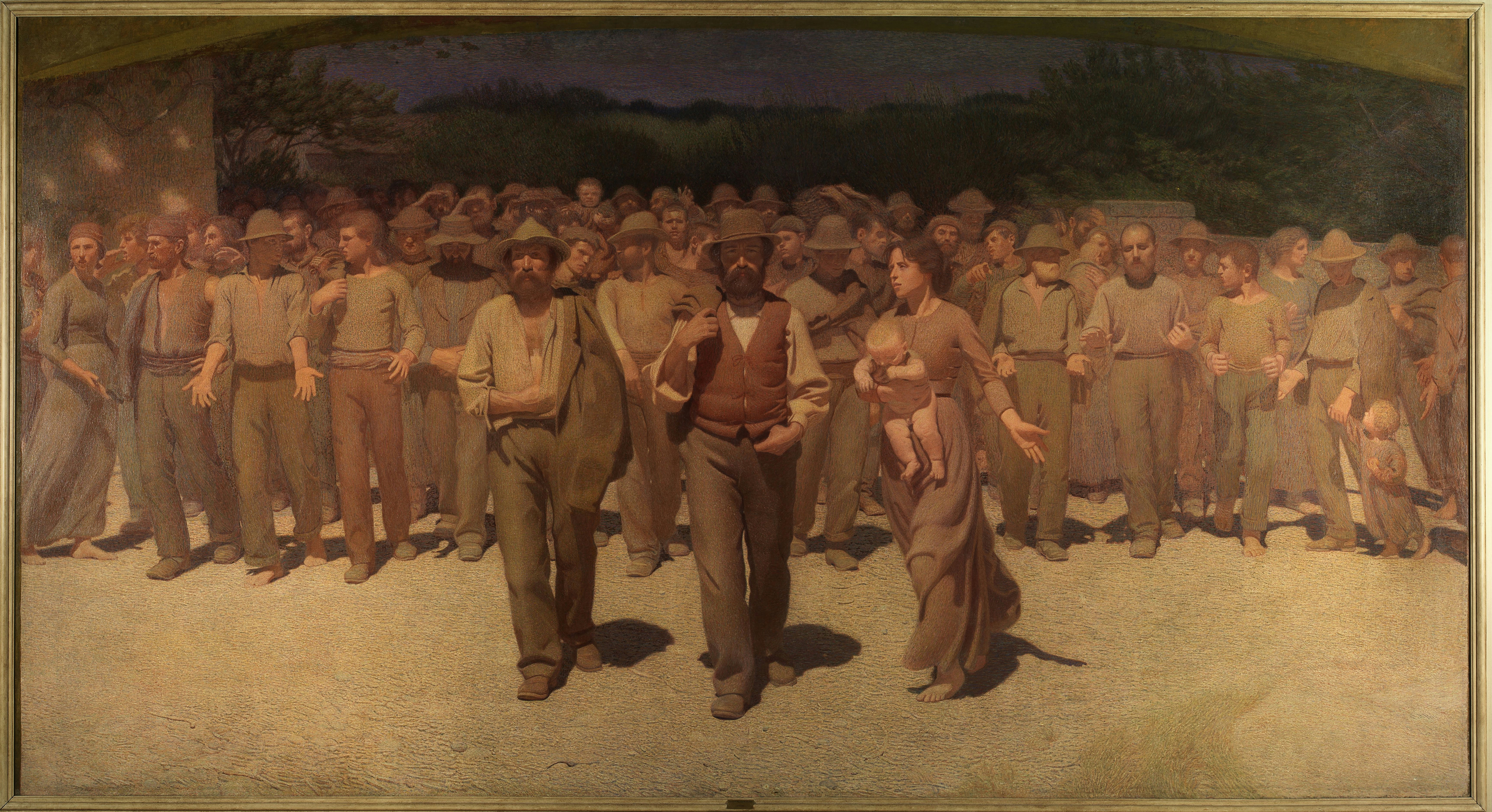
Cooder's lyrics reflected populist ideals and sentiments. (The Fourth Estate pictured)

Election Special is an American roots and blues rock album of protest songs. It is characterized by upbeat melodies, simple instrumentation, and swinging, sparse arrangements. Music journalist Robin Denselow describes Election Special as "musically ... very much a DIY album," while Matt Snow of Mojo compares Cooder to Tom Waits as a "gloves-off DIY soundscapist in wood, steel, and string." The album's music also incorporates folk, roots rock, and, most prominently, blues styles. Music writers compare the album's mix of folk and blues styles to Cooder's earlier, distinguishing albums. Zeth Lundy of the Boston Phoenix characterizes Cooder as a "Keith Richards/Woody Guthrie hybrid" on Election Special.

The deeply political album expands on the socio-political musings of Pull Up Some Dust and Sit Down. Cooder's forthright lyrics exhibit satire, dark humor, and bitter, apprehensive feelings about current events, including Guantanamo Bay, the Occupy movement, the killing of Trayvon Martin, Barack Obama's plight as US President, and the election of 2012. He addresses these topics through song-form vignettes, which express his anti-Republican party perspective. Cooder's songwriting also reappropriates lyrics from older musical sources, including protest songs, broadside ballads, and country blues. Nick Coleman of The Independent describes it as "heartfelt and unencumbered with musicological pedantry", while the newspaper's Andy Gill comments that Cooder "employs demotic" language and "variations of the blues ... to carry his broadsides." Jeff Schwager of PopMatters cites Robert Johnson and Woody Guthrie as influences on Cooder's songcraft for the album.

Music writers characterize Cooder's sentiments and political stance on the album as liberal and populist. Joseph Jon Lanthier of Slant Magazine observes "liberal convictions" and a "bleeding heart" in his lyrics, which he says express "reductive sympathy for President Obama and suspicions that fat cats are perverting the Bill of Rights". Music essayist Robert Christgau writes that Cooder "reappl[ies] the Popular Front mindset to the messy compromises of electoral politics, and all the must-hears illuminate the 2012 presidential election rather than merely referencing it". Bud Scoppa of Uncut calls the album "an impassioned screed against the dumbing down of America" and comments that Cooder eschews conventional "preaching" for "three-dimensional characters whose beliefs and opinions span the political spectrum of America in 2012." AllMusic's Thom Jurek cites it as "the most overtly political album of Cooder's career" to due its "soapbox style" and feels that the songs "express what he considers to be, as both an artist and a pissed-off citizen, the high-stakes historical gamble of the 2012 presidential and congressional contest."

== Songs ==
"Brother Is Gone"
The character-driven song is told from the perspective of Charles G. Koch as he joins his brother Dave to make a deal with the Devil, who promises to eventually "take one of you down back to hell with me".

"Mutt Romney Blues" is a three-chord, acoustic Delta blues song. Drawing parallels between the Mitt Romney dog incident and his political "plans and schemes", the song criticizes Republican presidential nominee Mitt Romney and is sung from the perspective of the Romney family's dog. Cooder was inspired by Al Sharpton's quote "how he treated his dog tells you a lot about him", and found the dog to be "a useful character ... when you view it in the light of the blues. Like a servant, a yardman, someone very low in the social order. He's just begging to be let down [from the car roof]." Bud Scoppa of Uncut characterizes the song as "the musical equivalent of a political cartoon". "Brother Is Gone" is poignantly styled as a sad folktale and features a haunting mandolin riff, a rueful tone, and wounded vocals. Its lyrics attribute the conservative Koch Brothers to the Deal with the Devil myth, which Cooder adapted from Robert Johnson's "Cross Road Blues". The lyrics cite their "crossroads" as "the prairie town of Wichita", where Koch Industries is headquartered. He said in an interview that "the only logical explanation for the Brothers I could come up with is, they made their deal at the crossroads with Satan." AllMusic's Thom Jurek cites it as "among the finest songs [Cooder]'s written."

"The Wall Street Part of Town" incorporates mandolin, Americana guitar riffs, and offers encouragement to protesters. Literary journalist Alec Wilkinson writes that the song's narrator is "looking for refuge in the part of town where the wind always blows at your back and the ground tilts in your favor." "Guantanamo" features cascading guitar by Cooder and handclaps. The song is about the nadir of human depravity. A slow, 12-bar blues lament, "Cold Cold Feeling" features juke joint, bottleneck guitar, and lyrics placing Barack Obama as the narrator singing his blues in the White House. Cooder meant to draw sympathy from listeners for Barack Obama. Geoff Cowart of musicOMH draws similarities of the song to "the voodoo blues of Screaming Jay Hawkins". "Going to Tampa" is a string band country song in Alla breve meter. Using scathing humor and burlesque lyrical elements, the song's farcical lyrics depict a fictional hijacking of the 2012 Republican National Convention by the Tea Party, as Cooder accuses both parties of racism and social engineering.

"Take Your Hands off It"
The anthemic blues rock song calls for the United States Constitution and Bill of Rights to be returned to the essence of mainstream American life.

Titled after the "drinking the Kool-Aid" metaphor, "Kool-Aid" has a dark electric blues style, noir musical vibes, and lyrics about the politically misguided lower middle class who support Republican tax cuts for the rich. The song's narrative follows a young American who accepts the Bush administration's pro-war stance, heads off to a foreign land willing to fight any person of color, and returns to his home jobless. According to writer James C. McKinley, Jr., the song continues a theme Cooder established on Pull Up Some Dust and Sit Down: "the idea of poor whites who have been let down by the politicians they have supported." It also paraphrases the lyrics to the Western swing standard "Cocaine Blues", and touches on the controversial stand-your-ground law, which Cooder viewed as "new Jim Crow laws – the stand-your-ground law is already responsible for about 80 shooting deaths of African Americans." "The 90 and the 9" repurposes the gospel hymn of the same name and the worker songs of Joe Hill with apocalyptic themes, an anti-war narrative, and a depiction of modern union workers as part of the lower 99% of income distribution in the US. Cooder was inspired to write the song by military recruitment of high schoolers in his native Los Angeles. "Take Your Hands off It" has a defiant tone, prominent guitar, and lyrics that rousingly defend constitutional rights.

== Release and promotion ==
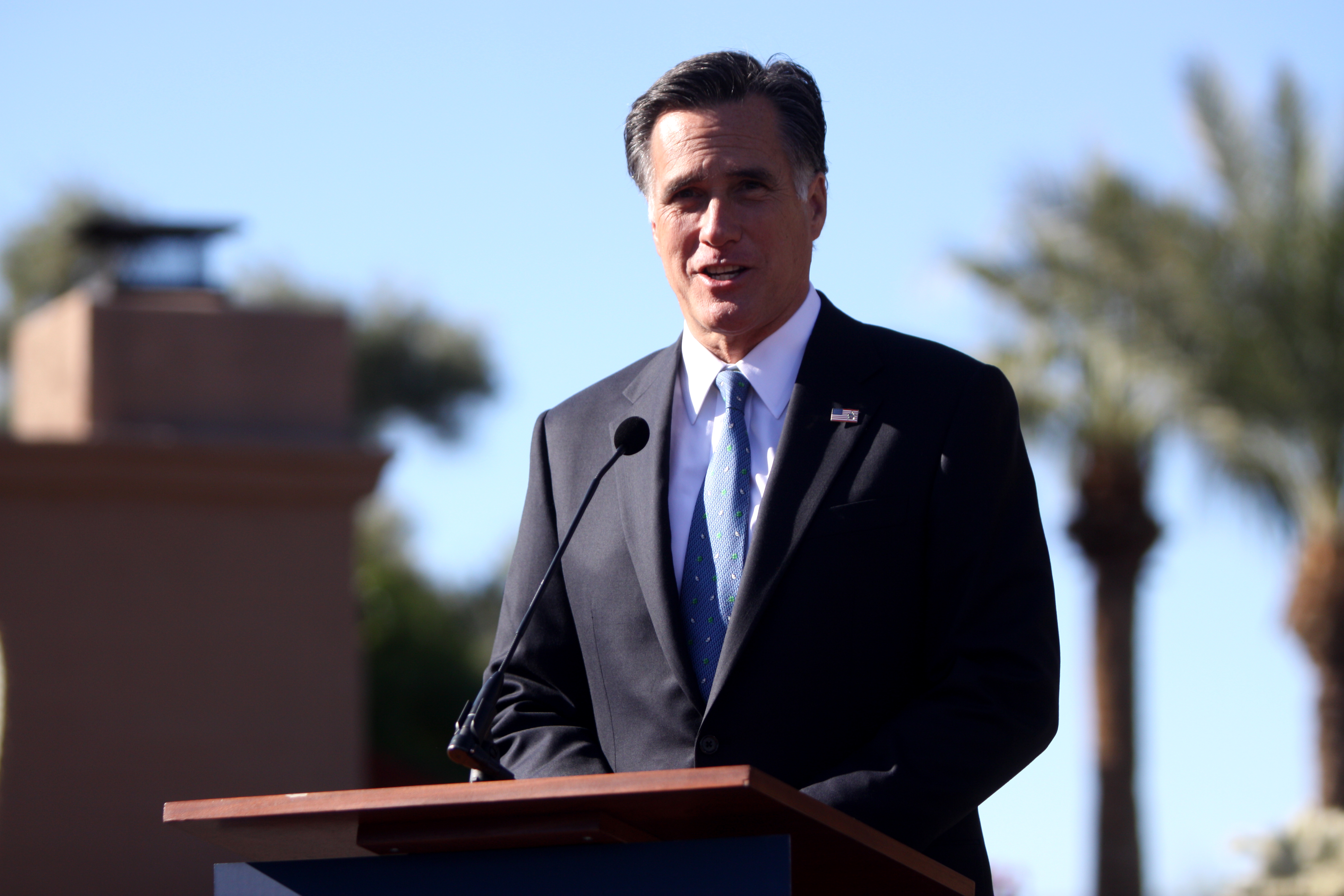
"Mutt Romney Blues" and its music video satirized then-Presidential nominee Mitt Romney.

Cooder's fifteenth album, Election Special was first released in the Netherlands on August 16, 2012. It was subsequently released as a digital download to iTunes on August 17 by Perro Verde Records and Nonesuch Records. The album's physical release in Germany was also on August 17. It followed on August 20 in the United Kingdom and Ireland, and on August 21 in North America and Australia. Its pre-order from Nonesuch Records' website was bundled with a campaign button and bumper sticker designed similarly to the album artwork.

Cooder released "The Wall Street Part of Town" as a free download on November 21, 2011. The song, which he wrote in support of the Occupy movement, was also aired that month on Democracy Now! and Jon Wiener's radio show on KPFK in Los Angeles. After reading her article on Larry McCarthy's affiliation with the pro-Romney Restore Our Future group, Cooder sent "Going to Tampa" to Jane Mayer of The New Yorker in February 2012; the song makes reference to McCarthy's Willie Horton ad during the 1988 presidential campaign. Mayer subsequently posted the song on SoundCloud and the magazine's website on February 10. Cooder also sent "Mutt Romney Blues" to Brave New Films, who subsequently produced a music video for the song. Released virally on February 17, the video features clips of Romney and a cartoonish depiction of the 1983 incident with his dog, who is in a car rooftop carrier singing the song.

Prior to the album's release, Cooder played a union hall in San Francisco for a longshoremen's union, which according to him, "got every turn of phrase. They'd never heard of me before or any of my records, but they understood all of these lyric things immediately. Because they've been educated in the union, you know what I mean? Because they lived it." On October 14, Cooder performed at This Land Is Your Land, a concert at the Kennedy Center in Washington, D.C. in tribute to Woody Guthrie. Cooder did not tour in promotion of Election Special, as the Kennedy Center was his last show. In an interview for The Strand at the time, he expressed disinterest in playing larger concert venues for the album, finding them more suitable for "fame" purposes rather than spreading a political message. Cooder remarked on the album's potential with listeners in general in an interview for Uncut, saying that:

"Who can say anymore? We're talking about an arcane pursuit. I mean, making records, are you kidding me? Some people would say, 'Why are you doing this?' I would say that it's the only thing I like to do. I'm finally where I'd like to be in my ability. It only took fucking forever, 60-odd years of trying to get good at this, for God's sakes. So what else would I do, whether or not people ever hear it or buy it? When I get 'em, I give 'em away to people. I know they're not gonna buy the damn things. But we'll see."

Election Special charted at number 164 on the US Billboard 200, on which it spent one week. It was Cooder's fourth-highest charting album in the US. It attained higher charting in other countries. In the United Kingdom, the album debuted at number 41 on the UK Albums Chart, and at number five on the Official Record Store Chart. It also debuted at number 25 on the Scottish Albums Chart. Election Special reached its highest position in Norway, where it peaked at number nine. It has charted for four weeks and reached number 28 in the Netherlands.

== Critical reception ==
Professional ratings
Aggregate scores
Source	Rating
AnyDecentMusic?	7.2/10
Metacritic	77/100
Review scores
Source	Rating
AllMusic	3.5/5 stars
The Daily Telegraph	3.5/5 stars
The Guardian	4/5 stars
The Independent	4/5 stars
The Irish Times	4/5 stars
MSN Music (Expert Witness)	B+
PopMatters	9/10
Q	2/5 stars
Rolling Stone	4/5 stars
USA Today	2/4 stars

Election Special was met with generally positive reviews. At Metacritic, which assigns a normalized rating out of 100 to reviews from mainstream publications, the album received an average score of 77, based on 17 reviews.

In Rolling Stone, David Fricke called the record a "vigorously partisan gem of gritty picking and black humor ... protest music delivered with a patriot's gifts – the American-roots beauty and expert fire in Ry Cooder's playing – and long memory." Desmond Traynor from State hailed Cooder as a "master craftsman" and declared, "social comment once again becomes high art, in the finest American tradition." Nick Coleman of The Independent found the album engaging and stated, "You might even argue that this and its predecessors ... represent the most cogent work of [Cooder's] long career." Robin Denselow of The Guardian said that Cooder uses humor and melodies to complement his "anger, protest and concern". Jeff Schwager of PopMatters found its stories "timeless" and commented that "it's guaranteed to please anyone inclined to give it a sympathetic listen". AllMusic's Thomas Jurek wrote that the album "serves two purposes: one is that it is the most organic record he's issued in almost two decades; and, more importantly, it restores topical protest music to a bona fide place in American cultural life." James C. McKinley, Jr. of The New York Times cited both Election Special and its predecessor as the "most topical" albums Cooder has recorded, while Bud Scoppa of Uncut asserted that he "has never before made an album as immediate as Election Special" because of immediate and cleverly written narratives.

Less impressed was Christgau, who wrote in MSN Music that protest songs in general are "hard to nail even in the moment" and felt that some of the album's songs "just don't twist the screw tight enough". He nonetheless gave Cooder "extra credit for both preaching to the converted and doing his damnedest to rally the holier-than-thou." Q was more critical of Cooder's "means of conveying" his message: "The fine lyrics have to fight against some weary-sounding arrangements." Slant Magazine's Joseph Jon Lanthier found the lyrics "limp" and the album "misfiring, wannabe agitprop", writing that, "though Cooder's clearly singing and playing from his bleeding heart on Election Special, the results make one wish that he'd pass both his mic and his guitar back to his brain." Geoff Cowart from musicOMH found its message and music to be "weak" and Cooder to be "overly preachy," commenting that "despite some first-class guitar playing ... the tunes come off second-best to the partisan grudge match."

== Track listing ==
All songs were written and produced by Ry Cooder, except where noted.

No.	Title	Length
1.	"Mutt Romney Blues"	3:45
2.	"Brother Is Gone"	5:03
3.	"The Wall Street Part of Town"	3:43
4.	"Guantanamo"	3:29
5.	"Cold Cold Feeling"	5:26
6.	"Going to Tampa"	3:58
7.	"Kool-Aid"	4:10
8.	"The 90 and the 9"	5:16
9.	"Take Your Hands Off It" (written by Joachim Cooder and Ry Cooder)	3:48

== Personnel ==
Credits for Election Special adapted from liner notes.

- Joachim Cooder – composer, drums, photography
- Ry Cooder – art direction, bass, composer, guitar, mandolin, producer, vocals
- Arnold McCuller – harmony vocals
- Martin Pradler – engineer, mastering, mixing
- Al Quattrocchi – art direction
- Jeff Smith – art direction
- Tornado Design – design

== Charts ==
Chart (2012)	Peak position
American Albums Chart	164
Australian Albums Chart	49
Belgian Albums Chart (Flanders)	41
Belgian Albums Chart (Wallonia)	154
British Albums Chart	41
Dutch Albums Chart	28
German Albums Chart	38
Irish Albums Chart	46
Norwegian Albums Chart	9
Scottish Albums Chart	25
Swedish Albums Chart	24
Swiss Albums Chart	44

== See also ==
- Vote for Change
