= Manuel Galbán =

Cuban musician

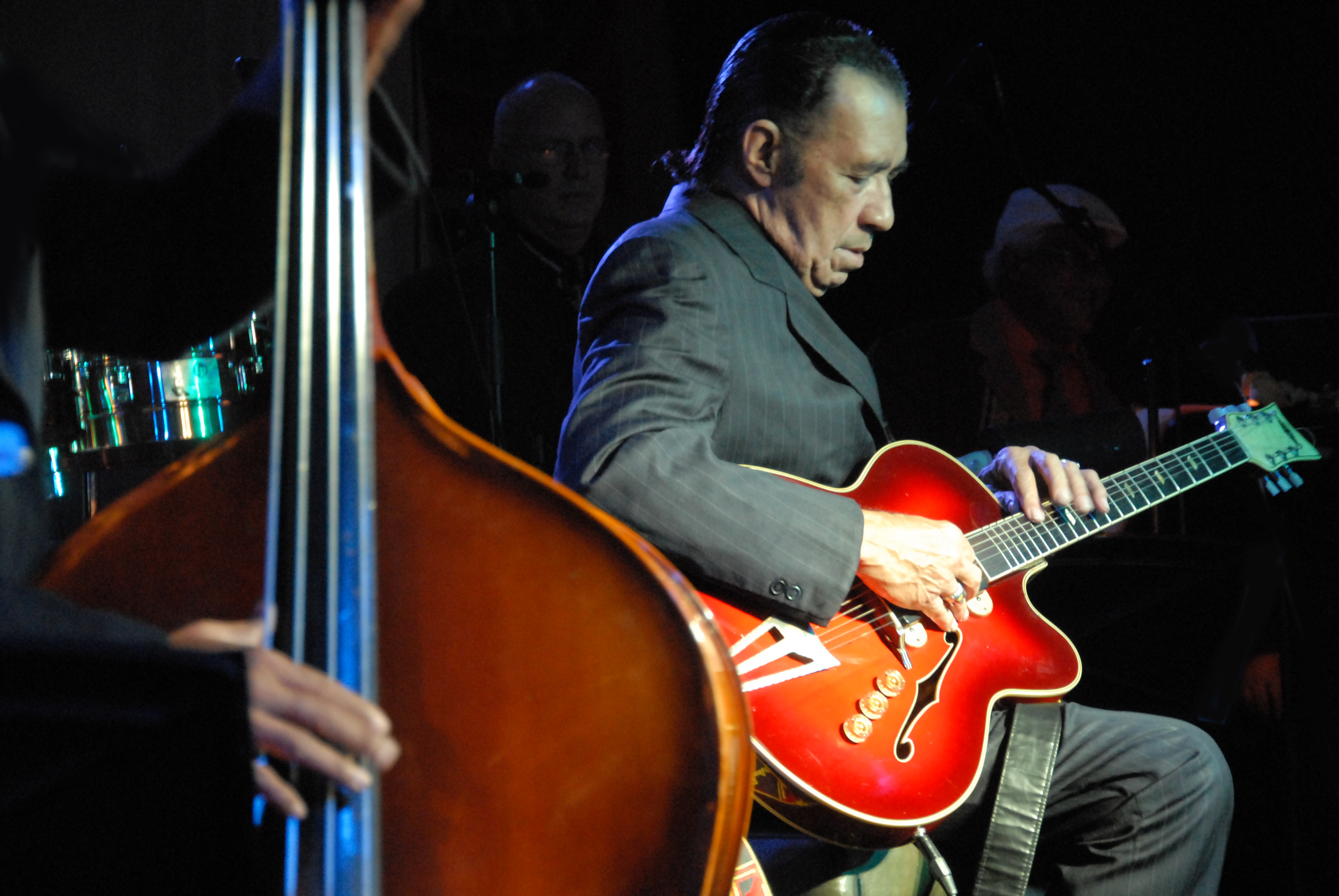

Background information
- Born: Manuel Galbán; January 14, 1931
- Died: July 7, 2011 (aged 80) Habana, Cuba
- Genres: Son cubano, bolero, guajira
- Occupations: Musician, guitarist, arranger
- Instruments: Electric guitar, tres, piano, acoustic guitar
- Years active: 1944–2011

Manuel Galbán (January 14, 1931 – July 7, 2011) was a Grammy-winning Cuban guitarist, pianist and arranger, most notable for his work with Los Zafiros, Ry Cooder and the Buena Vista Social Club. He died on July 7, 2011, of cardiac arrest at his home in Havana, Cuba.

== Biography ==
Manuel Galbán was born on January 14, 1931, and grew up in the small fishing town of Gibara in the Holguín Province of eastern Cuba. After playing guitar and tres in various local youth groups, he got his first professional gig at the age of 14 playing guitar with the Orchestra Villa Blanca. In 1956, he moved to Havana, where he spent seven years playing in bars and clubs and making frequent appearances on radio.

In 1963, he joined the legendary vocal group Los Zafiros, after a mutual friend had recommended him to them. His playing proved to be a such hit with Los Zafiros that he was told by singer Miguel Cancio "Galbán, from now on you're working with us; you're exactly what we're looking for". Galbán was considered an integral part of Los Zafiros by many people, including Cuban pianist Peruchin, who had once said "to replace Galbán you would need two guitarists". Galbán had left the group in 1972 after working to allay the personal problems that various members were struggling with.

Thereafter, he spent three years with Cuba's national musical ensemble, Dirección Nacional de Música. Furthermore, he then joined the Grupo Batey as a guitarist, vocalist and pianist, touring extensively across four continents over the course of 23 years.

In 1998, he joined the traditional Cuban group Vieja Trova Santiaguera, with whom he toured and released two highly acclaimed albums. He had also appeared in the Wim Wenders film Buena Vista Social Club, filmed with Ry Cooder, during the sessions for the debut solo album by Ibrahim Ferrer. Later he recorded with Ferrer and Buena Vista Social Club bassist Cachaíto Lopez, leading to his engagement as the featured guitarist with the touring ensemble named after the film.

In 2001, he recorded Mambo Sinuendo with Ry Cooder, which won the 2003 Grammy for Best Pop Instrumental Album. Cooder had commented on their inspiration to create the album, "Galbán and I felt that there was a sound that had not been explored, a Cuban electric-guitar band that could re-interpret the atmosphere of the 1950s with beauty, agility, and simplicity."

Galbán died from a heart attack on July 7, 2011, at the age of 80.

== Style and equipment ==
Galbán's distinctive electric guitar sound makes liberal use of reverb, tremolo, diminished arpeggio runs and palm mutes. Using a Fender Telecaster with heavy gauge strings, he references the tone of Duane Eddy and the early surf guitarists whilst playing the melodic runs and chordal patterns associated with traditional Cuban music. He has been pictured using Fender Twin, Roland JC120 and Fender Bassman amps, as well as a Dunlop TS-1 stereo tremolo pedal.
