= The Prodigal Son (Ry Cooder album) =

2018 album

Studio album by Ry Cooder
- Released: May 11, 2018
- Recorded: 2018
- Studio: Sage & Sound Recording Studios in East Hollywood and Wireland Studios in Chatsworth, Los Angeles
- Genre: American roots, blues rock
- Length: 48:11
- Labels: Perro Verde; Concord
- Producers: Ry Cooder; Joachim Cooder

Ry Cooder chronology
Election Special (2012)	The Prodigal Son (2018)

Singles from The Prodigal Son
- 1. "Shrinking Man" Released: March 1, 2018; 2. "The Prodigal Son" Released: March 29, 2018

Professional ratings
Aggregate scores
Source	Rating
Metacritic	83/100
Review scores
Source	Rating
AllMusic	4/5 stars
American Songwriter	4/5 stars
Blurt	5/5 stars
Financial Times	4/5 stars
The Independent	4/5 stars
The Irish Times	5/5 stars
PopMatters	8/10
Record Collector	4/5 stars
Rolling Stone	3.5/5 stars
Uncut	4/5 stars

The Prodigal Son is a 2018 studio album, the sixteenth to be released by American singer-songwriter and multi-instrumentalist Ry Cooder. The album was released on May 11, 2018, by Concord and Perro Verde record labels. The record also produced two singles.

== Background ==
A successor to his 2012 album Election Special, and Cooder's first album in six years, The Prodigal Son seeks a return to the Gospel-infused spirit of his early career. Notably, the album features covers of the songs of the likes of Blind Alfred Reed, the Pilgrim Travelers and the Stanley Brothers alongside three original compositions.

According to Cooder, the album was born primarily from Cooder's 2015–16 tour alongside bluegrass musicians Ricky Skaggs and Sharon White of The Whites and finds a basis in incorporating elements of some of the white gospel music performed during the tour.

To promote the album, two in-studio video performances were released to the official Ry Cooder YouTube channel, one of "Straight Street" and one of the album's title track.

== Reception ==
In a five-starred 2018 review for The Irish Times, Joe Breen said: "Ry Cooder hasn’t lost the activist voice that drove Election Special, his last new album, just before Obama's re-election, but The Prodigal Son is a softer shade of his political self, more balm than brute force."

Giving the album four stars, Terry Staunton, writing in Record Collector, said "Cooder astutely plunders the grammar of the nation’s folk music history with remarkable results. Three of its 11 songs come from his own pen, but elsewhere his archival skills come to the fore, referencing such bygone chroniclers as The Stanley Brothers and Blind Willie Johnson... Key to the album’s success is Cooder’s regular collaborator, son Joachim, with whom he’s worked for close to 25 years. Serving as intuitive drummer and keen-eared co-producer, he is integral to fashioning a set of songs that while acknowledging the rich tapestry of the US’ folk past ring loud and clear with modern-day truths."

Hal Horowitz, in a four-starred review for American Songwriter, said: "Cooder has returned to a similar basic blueprint of stripped-down gospel, backwoods and folk blues that got him started on his twisting musical journey all those years ago... this long-awaited comeback of sorts for Cooder is a joyful, intense and occasionally humorous experience that any Americana fan will enjoy."

== Track listing ==
All tracks are written by Ry Cooder and Joachim Cooder, except where noted.

No.	Title	Writer(s)	Length
1.	"Straight Street"	James W. Alexander and Jesse Whitaker	4:00
2.	"Shrinking Man"	Ry Cooder	4:07
3.	"Gentrification"		3:13
4.	"Everybody Ought to Treat a Stranger Right"	Blind Willie Johnson and traditional	3:46
5.	"The Prodigal Son"	Traditional	3:48
6.	"Nobody's Fault but Mine"	Blind Willie Johnson and traditional	6:07
7.	"You Must Unload"	Blind Alfred Reed	5:26
8.	"I'll Be Rested When the Roll Is Called"	Blind Roosevelt Graves and traditional	3:11
9.	"Harbor of Love"	Carter Stanley	5:46
10.	"Jesus and Woody"		5:57
11.	"In His Care"	William L. Dawson	3:39
Total length:			48:11

== Charts ==
=== Weekly charts ===
Chart (2018)	Peak position
Austrian Albums (Ö3 Austria)	14
Belgian Albums (Ultratop Flanders)	8
Belgian Albums (Ultratop Wallonia)	107
Dutch Albums (Album Top 100)	16
French Albums (SNEP)	196
German Albums (Offizielle Top 100)	17
Irish Albums (IRMA)	11
Italian Albums (FIMI)	32
Norwegian Albums (VG-lista)	29
Spanish Albums (Promusicae)	41
Swedish Albums (Sverigetopplistan)	34
Swiss Albums (Schweizer Hitparade)	7
UK Albums (Official Charts)	10
US Billboard 200	161
US Top Rock Albums (Billboard)	31

=== Year-end charts ===
Chart (2018)	Position
Belgian Albums (Ultratop Flanders)	109
