= Bobby King =

American gospel-style, R&B and soul singer (born 1944)

Bobby King (born July 28, 1944, in Lake Charles, Louisiana, United States) is an American gospel-style, R&B and soul singer. He formed a singing duo with Terry Evans in the early 1970s. Since 1973, King has sung on most Ry Cooder albums. He was also the lead backing vocalist in Bruce Springsteen's Human Touch tour band of 1992–93. The duo also undertook recording sessions with Bob Dylan, John Fogerty, Harrison Kerle and Boz Scaggs.

He has also released two solo albums, Bobby King (1981) and Love in the Fire (1984), and two albums with Terry Evans, Live and Let Live! (1988) and Rhythm, Blues, Soul & Grooves (1990). Lou Reed selected Live and Let Live! as one of his 'picks of 1989'.
