= Arlen Roth =

American guitarist, teacher, and author (born 1952)

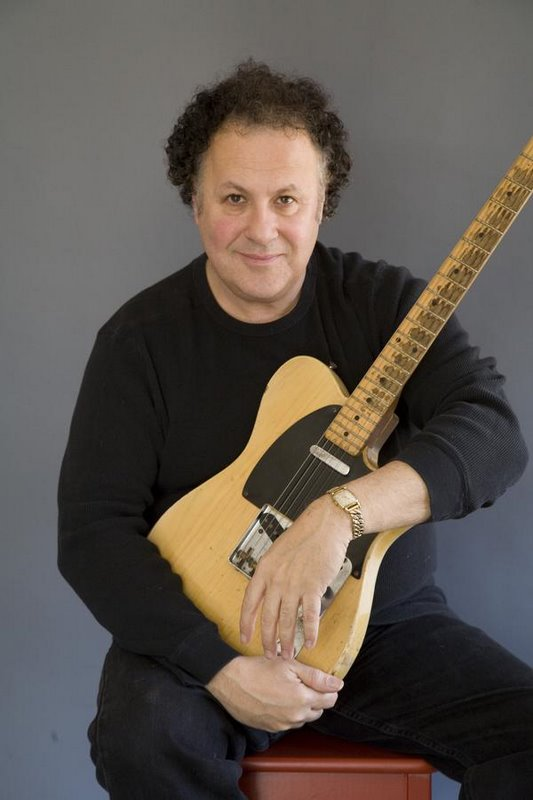

Background information
- Born: October 30, 1952 (age 74); Bronx, New York, U.S.
- Genres: Pop; rock; blues
- Occupations: Musician; singer; author; teacher
- Instruments: Guitar; Slide Guitar; Lap Steel; Dobro
- Years active: 1963–present
- Labels: Rounder; Flying Fish; Aquinnah Records; [[MoMojo Records

Arlen Roth (born October 30, 1952) is an American guitarist, teacher, and author. From 1982 to 1992, he was a columnist for Guitar Player magazine. Those ten years of columns became a book, Hot Guitar.

== Music career ==
Arlen Roth's father, Al Ross (Abraham Roth), was a cartoonist for The New Yorker magazine and many other publications over a 75-year career. He lived to the age of 100, and was one of the four Roth Brothers: Al Ross, Irving Roir, Ben Roth and Salo, all of whom became cartoonists. Al Ross was also a great painter and fine artist, and he was the one who encouraged Arlen to become a guitarist when he saw Arlen playing along with the flamenco records he would play in the Bronx apartment.

Roth attended the High School of Music and Art in New York City as an art student from 1966 to 1969. He then studied at the Philadelphia College of Art from 1969 to 1971. His band Steel lived with him and played in Woodstock, New York, on weekends, where he was discovered. In 1970, Steel put on the first Woodstock Reunion concert to commemorate the one-year anniversary of the festival in Bethel, New York, where Roth lived every summer since he was born. Steel was the only band and played four hours each day. Soon after, he moved to Woodstock and began his career as a professional guitarist.

He began to back-up in recording and touring with Happy and Artie Traum, Eric Andersen, Tony Bird, Paul Butterfield, Art Garfunkel, John Herald, Janis Ian, Janey & Dennis (Janey Street & Dennis Pereca}, Looking Glass, Don McLean, John Prine, Helen Schneider, Pete Seeger, Phoebe Snow, Dusty Springfield, Loudon Wainwright III. He toured with the Bee Gees in 1974, Simon and Garfunkel in 1983, and Duane Eddy with Huey Lewis and the News. In 1976, he appeared in the Bob Dylan film Renaldo and Clara performing with Ramblin' Jack Elliott, Patti Smith and Phil Ochs.

He is featured performing on his 1953 Telecaster with Patti Smith in the 2019 Bob Dylan / Martin Scorsese film "Rolling Thunder." From the 1975 tour of the same name. Bob Dylan borrowed Roth's Martin 000-18 guitar that night, which Arlen bought from Ry Cooder earlier that year when Arlen was on tour with John Prine.

His first book, Slide Guitar, was published by Oak Publications when he was 21. In 2012 Thank You Les, a Les Paul tribute album and documentary, were released with Roth performing "Mr. Sandman" and his daughter Lexie Roth singing the Les Paul and Mary Ford song "Vaya Con Dios".

He released a Slide Guitar Summit album in 2015 featuring duets with guitarists Cindy Cashdollar, Sonny Landreth, David Lindley, Greg Martin, Lee Roy Parnell, Jack Pearson, Rick Vito, Jimmy Vivino, and Johnny Winter. This is said to be Winter's final recording.

Roth is a Telecaster enthusiast who wrote the book Masters of the Telecaster detailing the techniques of many famous Telecaster guitarists. He has been called "Master of the Telecaster."

He has performed and recorded with Ian Hunter, Dusty Springfield, Eric Andersen, the Bee Gees, Rory Block, Cindy Cashdollar, Ry Cooder, Bob Dylan, Duane Eddy, Ramblin' Jack Elliot, Pete Seeger, John Entwistle, Art Garfunkel, Danny Gatton, Vince Gill, Levon Helm, Bill Kirchen, Sonny Landreth, Albert Lee, David Lindley, Don McLean, Steve Morse, Phil Ochs, Brad Paisley, John Prine, John Sebastian, Simon and Garfunkel, Paul Simon, Phoebe Snow, James Taylor, Kate Taylor, Doris Abrahams, Rachel Faro, Livingston Taylor, Dan Hill, Rick Wakeman, Happy & Artie Traum, Marion Williams, Joe Louis Walker, and Steve Wariner.

Roth's version of "Scarborough Fair" is featured on the soundtrack of the film Lost In Translation.

In 1998, Roth lost his wife Deborah, and their first child Gillian in a fatal auto accident on the Merritt Parkway in Connecticut. Gillian was 14 years old, and Deborah was 47. Gillian was an actress, a model, and a guitarist. She had just signed on to do a 27-episode TV show for Nickelodeon called the "Gunks" a show about an all-girl rock band, loosely based on "The Monkees."

== Hot Licks video and audio instruction ==
In 1979 Roth and his wife Deborah started the Hot Licks Audio and Video label. With only $2000 left to their names, Roth decided that he was going to act on the idea he had had in 1973 to create taped musical instruction, as he had always encouraged his students to tape their private lessons. His very first advertisement featured 42 cassette lessons in all, stretched over 7 series of 6 tapes apiece. The tapes very quickly became very successful worldwide - many of his students were also very experienced professionals. While teaching Ralph Macchio the guitar parts for the movie Crossroads, he began recording his first videos (in 1984). Six of these featured Roth as instructor and one was by his friend John Entwistle, bass player of The Who. The close-ups of fretting, strumming, and other techniques he helped develop, and which were prominent in Crossroads, became the trademark of the videos.

The Hot Licks catalog grew to also include instructional videos for drums, banjo, lap steel, mandolin, voice and harmonica, with 150 artists and 180 videos. Roth has been recognized as the first to create video music instruction. In 2006 The Music Sales Group acquired the Hot Licks video catalog.

From 2007 to 2012 Roth hosted a series of daily video lessons at Gibson.com. It is estimated he has had close to 1 million students on Gibson. He also wrote daily blogs for Gibson Guitar. Arlen has also been known as the Master of the Telecaster.

Roth has stated that "many of these Hot Licks artists were also personal heroes of mine, and it was an honor to work with them".

Eric Johnson, Joe Pass, George Benson, Ronnie Earl, Jimmy Bruno, Greg Martin, Lee Roy Parnell, Adrian Legg, Andy Summers, Emily Remler, Tuck Andress, Mick Taylor, Buddy Guy, Danny Gatton, James Burton, Jorge Morel, Bill Kanengiser, Joe Morello, Stuart Hamm, Harvey Mandel, Debbie Davies, David Bryan, Tico Torres, Joe Beck, Ginger Baker, Max D. Barnes, Rudy Sarzo, Tommy Aldridge, Carmine Appice, Vinnie Moore, Brian Setzer, Tal Farlow, Charlie Byrd, Mundell Lowe, Larry Coryell, Cornell Dupree, Junior Wells, J. Geils, Jimmy Thackery, Ronnie Earl, Duke Robillard, Warren Haynes, Allen Woody, David Grissom, Scotty Anderson, Lonnie Mack, Otis Rush, Gil Parris, Joe Morello, Sal Salvador, Jeff Tamelier, Steve Douglas, Mick Taylor, John Entwistle, Jerry Jemmott, Brent Mason, Johnny Hiland, Joe Bonamassa, Jimmy Thackery, Nils Lofgren, Robin Trower, Marty Friedman, Tommy Tedesco, Craig Chaquico, Steve Morse, John Jarvis, Michael Lee Firkins, Jason Becker, Michael Fath.

== Media appearances ==
- Roth wrote and performed most, and coached all of Ralph Macchio's guitar parts in the 1986 movie Crossroads and directed many of those scenes. He also served as the film's official authenticator of any scenes involving music, and the performing of the music. On one day, the scene of Robert Johnson recording was halted because Roth noticed that the guitar's tuning pegs were from the wrong era.
- Roth appeared in the Bob Dylan film, Renaldo and Clara, performing with Bob Dylan, Joan Baez, Ramblin' Jack Elliot, Phil Ochs, and Patti Smith.
- Roth appeared on Late Night with Conan O'Brien with friend Danny Gatton, in 1994, performing "Tequila" from his album Toolin' Around.
- He appeared on Saturday Night Live in 1978 with Art Garfunkel. During warm-ups for this show Roth, Dan Aykroyd, and John Belushi, just for fun, put on sunglasses and outfits and performed "Rocket 88" for the audience.
- Roth's trademark tune is his instrumental version of "When a Man Loves a Woman", and was called "Perhaps the most intense workout ever recorded on a Telecaster" by Tom Wheeler of Guitar Player magazine. It reached No. 2 on the British Pop Charts, and was used by BBC Radio to sign off the air every night for many years.
- His column in Guitar Player, "Hot Guitar", ran for 10 years, and was later published as a book. He also wrote numerous articles for this and other magazines.
- Roth performed on the live German TV show, Ohne Filter, with Jack Bruce on bass, in 1984.
- Roth created and performed all the music for the Aaron Spelling TV show, 10-8: Officers on Duty.
- In 2014 Roth was interviewed on Dan Aykroyd's syndicated "Elwood's Bluesmobile" radio show for his SLIDE GUITAR SUMMIT album, and they talked about when he was on SNL in 1978, and when he, John Belushi and Akyroyd initiated the first trial Blues Brothers performance to warm up the crowd before the show.
- Entertainment Tonight did two specials on Arlen Roth's contributions to the film Crossroads
- In 2016 Roth wrote and performed a solo acoustic guitar piece for an ESPN film at the Minskoff Theater in NYC with Daveed Diggs and Leslie Odom, Jr. of the play Hamilton.
- In 2021 Roth performed at The Grand Ole Opry in Nashville with John Sebastian.

== Awards and honors ==
- Top 100 Most Influential Guitarists of All-time, Vintage Guitar magazine
- Top 50 Acoustic Guitarists of All-Time, Gibson.com
- Top 29 Best Rock Guitarists Ever Music Industry How-to
- Top 10 Guitar Sounds Ever Recorded, Vintage Guitar magazine, "Treat Her Right"
- New York Blues Hall of Fame (2015)
- Warren Guitars has a 3-pickup Arlen Roth Signature electric guitar model
- Santa Cruz Guitars released an Arlen Roth signature AR/OM acoustic guitar model
- Delaney Guitars has an Arlen Roth signature electric guitar model
- Inducted into the New York Country Music Hall of Fame (2023)

== Discography ==
- Guitarist (Rounder, 1978)
- Hot Pickups (Rounder, 1979)
- Paint Job Breaking Records 1983
- Lonely Street (Flying Fish, 1984)
- Arlen Roth (Rounder, 1987)
- Toolin' Around (Blue Plate/Horizon, 1993)
- Drive It Home (Solid Air, 2001)
- Landscape (Aquinnah, 2005)
- Toolin' Around Woodstock w/Levon Helm (Aquinnah, 2007)
- Subway Walls and Tenement Halls: The Music of Simon and Garfunkel (Aquinnah, 2009)
- How Does it Feel? The Music of Bob Dylan (Aquinnah, 2009)
- All Tricked Out (Aquinnah, 2012)
- Arlen Roth and the Cordobas Live at the Iridium (2012)
- Slide Guitar Summit (Aquinnah, 2015)
- Paint it Black: Acoustic Stones (Aquinnah, 2016)
- TELEMASTERS (Aquinnah, 2019)
- John Sebastian and Arlen Roth Explore the Spoonful Songbook (BMG/Renew/Sony, 2021)
- SUPER SOUL SESSION with Jerry Jemmott (BlueHeart Records, 2023)
- PLAYING OUT THE STRING(Aquinnah Records, 2024)
- BLUES-GRASS (MoMojo Records, 2026)

== Bibliography ==
- Slide Guitar, Oak Publications
- How to Play Blues Guitar, Acorn Music
- Nashville Guitar, Oak Publications
- Arlen Roth's Complete Electric Guitar, Doubleday, Hal Leonard
- Hot Guitar, Miller/Freeman
- Arlen Roth's Complete Acoustic Guitar, Schirmer/Macmillan, Hal Leonard
- Heavy Metal Guitar, Schirmer/Macmillan
- Rock Guitar for Future Stars, Ballantine Books
- Masters of the Telecaster, Warner Publications
- Arlen Roth Teaches Slide Guitar, Hal Leonard
- Arlen Roth Teaches Fingerpicking, Hal Leonard

== See also ==
- List of Telecaster players
