= Los Angeles Stories =

2011 short-story collection by Ry Cooder

- Los Angeles Stories
- Author: Ry Cooder
- Language: English
- Publisher: City Lights
- Publication date: October 2011
- Pages: 224
- ISBN: 978-0-87286-519-8

Los Angeles Stories is a short-story collection by Ry Cooder. Cooder's first published story collection, the book was published by City Lights Books in late 2011 as part of its City Lights Noir collection.

== Table of Contents ==
- All in a day's work
- Who do you know that I don't?
- La vida es un sueno
- Kill me, por favor
- End of the line
- My telephone keeps ringin'
- Gun shop boogie
- Smile

== Reception ==
Early reports in the Los Angeles media described the book as "an atmospheric look at post-World War II L.A. that unfolds in Chavez Ravine and Venice, Santa Monica and Bunker Hill." and compared the style to "the Beats and Noir", with "musicians, streetwalkers and other hard-nosed denizens cruising through the madness of our city." San Francisco Chronicle reviewer Jonah Raskin said, "Cooder fans will enjoy the upbeat mix of music and murder. Aficionados of noir fiction will love the characters . . . ." Mother Jones critic Tim McDonnell called it "a requiem to a city wherein the world's tides swept together an impossibly diverse culture that was quickly squandered and homogenized by Hollywood and hit-hungry record executives" and "a deeply humane history of the time before instant pop hits and sprawling superhighways."
