= Hans Theessink =

Dutch guitarist (born 1948)

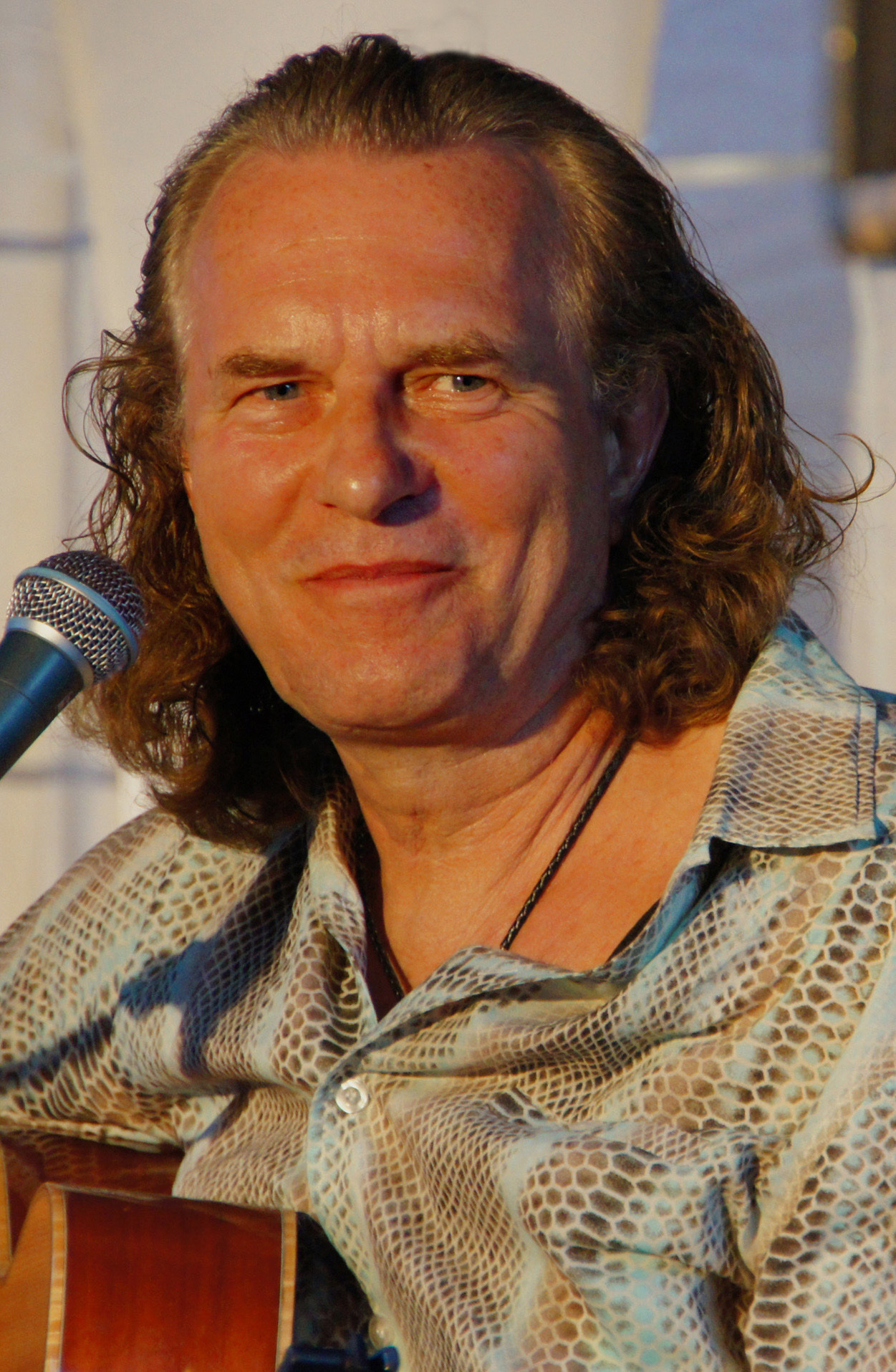
Hans Theessink in Vienna, 2012.

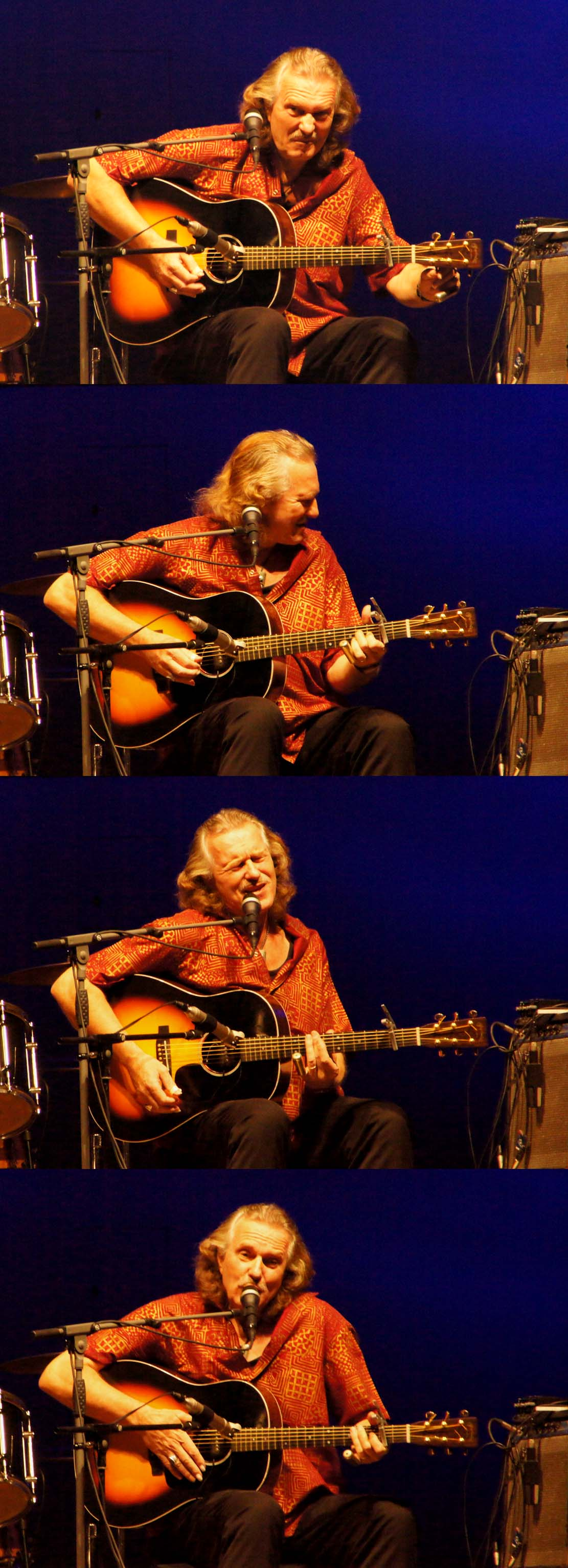
Theessink performing in Konzerthaus, Vienna, in 2012

Hans Theessink (born 5 April 1948, Enschede, Netherlands) is a Dutch guitarist, mandolinist, singer and songwriter, living in Vienna, Austria. He performs blues and roots music, particularly in a Delta blues style. He is a bass-baritone. Theessink has released 20 albums, a songbook, a blues-guitar instruction video and a DVD.

In 2012, he released Delta Time (2012), performed with Terry Evans and featuring Ry Cooder.

In 2013, he released Wishing Well, which he described as a retrospective album looking back at many of his favorite moments in his music career. The album also features several originals, including "House Up On The Hill," which he described as a song about flooding in Mississippi. Hans has said he was partly inspired by observing floods in his home country of The Netherlands during his childhood.
