= Crossroads (1986 film) =

1986 film by Walter Hill

- Theatrical release poster
- Directed by: Walter Hill
- Written by: John Fusco
- Produced by: Mark Carliner
- Starring: Ralph Macchio; Joe Seneca; Jami Gertz
- Cinematography: John Bailey
- Edited by: Freeman A. Davies
- Music by: Ry Cooder
- Distributed by: Columbia Pictures
- Release date: March 14, 1986
- Running time: 99 minutes
- Country: United States
- Language: English
- Box office: $5,839,000 (US)

Crossroads is a 1986 American musical drama film, inspired by the legend of blues musician Robert Johnson. It is directed by Walter Hill from a screenplay by John Fusco, and stars Ralph Macchio, Joe Seneca and Jami Gertz. It features an original score by Ry Cooder featuring classical guitar by William Kanengiser and harmonica by Sonny Terry. Steve Vai appears in the film as the devil's virtuosic guitar player in the climactic guitar duel.

Fusco was a traveling blues musician prior to attending New York University Tisch School of the Arts, where he wrote Crossroads as an assignment in a master class led by Waldo Salt and Ring Lardner Jr. The student screenplay won first place in the national FOCUS Awards (Films of college and University Students) and was sold to Columbia Pictures while Fusco was still a student.

The film was released by Columbia Pictures on March 14, 1986. Although Crossroads received positive reviews from critics, it was not a financial success. However, it has been considered a cult classic, particularly among musicians and guitarists.

== Plot ==
17-year-old Eugene Martone has a fascination for blues music while studying classical guitar at the Juilliard School in New York City. Researching blues and guitar music brings famed Robert Johnson's mythically creative acclaim to his attention; especially intriguing are the legends surrounding exactly how Johnson became so talented – most notably the one claiming he "sold his soul to the Devil at the crossroads", as well as a famed "missing song" that was lost, supposedly evermore, to the world.

In his quest to find this song, he researches old archived newspaper clippings, learning that Johnson's longtime friend, musician Willie Brown, is alive and incarcerated for murder or attempted murder in a nearby minimum security hospital. Eugene goes to see the elderly man, who denies several times that he is that Willie Brown. He finally admits his identity after hearing Eugene play some blues (but notes that Eugene "plays with no soul"). Willie then says he knows the missing Robert Johnson tune in question but refuses to give it to Eugene unless the boy breaks him out of the facility and gets him to Mississippi, where he has unfinished business to settle. Eugene agrees and they head south. The boy soon realizes, however, that Willie is constantly running minor scams, such as falsely claiming that he has enough money to cover their bus tickets (although Willie may have done this on purpose, so Eugene would experience some real hardship). With only $40 on them, they end up "hoboing" from Memphis to Mississippi.

Willie scolds Eugene for playing an old guitar in order to give the impression to be a bluesman, but it was Muddy Waters who invented electricity. Hence, Eugene trades his last valuables in a pawn shop for a Fender Telecaster and a portable Pignose amplifier. Willie further tells Eugene that the secret of playing the blues is using a slide.

During their quest, Eugene and Willie experience the blues legacy of Robert Johnson first-hand, taking part in an impromptu jam session at a "jook joint" (as Willie calls it), where Eugene is given the nickname "Lightning Boy" by Willie because of his musical skill. Eugene jokingly suggests that he himself ought to "sell his soul to the Devil at the crossroads", Willie angrily slaps him and demands he is not to joke about that.

The pair meet 17-year-old Frances, who is fleeing her abusive stepfather. She hitchhikes with them, and she and Eugene start a relationship. When she abandons them to continue her own journey, Eugene is left heartbroken but with a deeper feeling for the blues. At the same time, Willie confesses that there is no missing Johnson song, but tells the boy that he has proven himself far beyond what learning any blues song could ever teach him.

They reach a deserted crossroads in rural Mississippi, where Willie reveals his secret: his ability on the harmonica came about because of a deal with the Devil, which he made at this very location. Willie now hopes to end the deal. The Devil, who calls himself Scratch and Legba, shows up and insists that the contract for Willie's soul is still valid, even if Willie is dissatisfied with how his life turned out.

Eugene, believing the other two are joking around, steps into the conversation. The Devil offers a challenge: if Eugene can come to a special concert and win a guitar battle against his ringer guitarist, then Willie gets his soul back. If Eugene loses, then Eugene too forfeits his soul. Despite Willie's protests, Eugene agrees to the deal. Willie and Eugene are transported to a music hall, where metal-blues guitar master Jack Butler, who also sold his soul for musical ability, is wowing the crowd with his prowess. Eugene, now understanding the situation, receives a mojo bag from Willie to hold in his pocket. He also slips his slide on, giving him a perceived advantage over his opponent.

Eugene and Butler trade flamboyant guitar parts, with each able to top the other. Eventually, Eugene falls back on his classical training, playing a fast and difficult piece that Butler cannot match. Dejected, Butler drops his guitar and strides off, and the Devil tears up Willie's contract, freeing the bluesman's soul.

Willie and Eugene are transported back to Mississippi, where they start walking again, deciding to head to Chicago to play together. Willie tells Eugene that after their stay in Chicago they must part ways, so Eugene can go out on his own "to take the music somewhere else."

== Cast ==
- Ralph Macchio as Eugene Martone
- Joe Seneca as Willie Brown
  - Guy Killum as Willie (17-years old)
- Jami Gertz as Frances
- Robert Judd as Scratch
- Joe Morton as Scratch's Assistant
- Steve Vai as Jack Butler
- Dennis Lipscomb as Lloyd
- Harry Carey Jr. as Bartender
- John Hancock as Sheriff Tilford
- Allan Arbus as Dr. Santis
- Gretchen Palmer as Beautiful Girl/Dancer
- Al Fann as Pawnbroker
- Sammie Minniefield Jr as Pete
- Wally Taylor as O.Z.
- Tim Russ as Robert Johnson
- Tex Donaldson as John McGraw
- Akosua Busia as Woman at Boardinghouse
- Edward Walsh as Harley Terhune
- Allan Graf as Alvin

== Production ==
=== Development ===
The script was an original by John Fusco, who had long been interested in blues music. He worked as a blues singer and musician but had been warned by a doctor to rest his voice. In 1981 his girlfriend, who was working at a rest home, told him that an old black man with a harmonica had been admitted. Fusco went to visit him and on the way dreamt up a story about what would happen if the player was a legendary blues player. This gave him the idea for the story. He expanded on the myth of Robert Johnson selling his soul to the Devil at the crossroads. Coincidentally, Johnson was inducted to the inaugural class of the Rock and Roll Hall of Fame in January 1986, while the film was in production.

Fusco wrote the script as his Master's Thesis at New York University. It was only his second screenplay. Producer Mark Carliner acted as Fusco's independent adviser on it and later helped get it made. Fusco was paid $250,000.

Jami Gertz was cast as the female lead. "She had the warmth I was looking for", Hill said, "and she was feisty, but I wondered, is she strong enough? She has to put Macchio through the experience of falling in love, and then she has to leave him, to strengthen his character for the movie's final showdown. I decided to go with her, and I was amazed by how strong she seemed on the screen." Guitar specialist Arlen Roth was hired as Macchio's musical coach.

Hill was aware of some surface similarities to The Karate Kid: "You boil it down, and it sounds like a young kid and a wise old guy and their showdown with evil", said Hill. "But if you really look at Crossroads, it's a completely different movie ... I knew my most difficult task would be creating real, believable scenes between Macchio and Seneca. They had to be real characters; with an ongoing reality level, to work at all. You have to set the stage, or when your movie shifts gears to fantasy, you lose your audience."

=== Filming ===
Shooting took place on location in Beulah, Mississippi, New York City as well as Hollywood. Blues legend Frank Frost makes a cameo.

"I think the blues still speaks to kids today", said Ry Cooder, who performed the music with Steve Vai and Arlen Roth. "It's so old that it's new."

Cooder says the final duel involving Vai "had to be all mapped out, since we had to carefully choreograph the call-and-response of that guitar duel and use it as playback during the filming. Steve Vai is tremendously scientific when it comes to guitar playing, and was able to adapt to that process."

The original script ended with Joe Seneca's character dying on a Greyhound bus. Director Walter Hill's father had died shortly before production commenced, and he found filming this scene difficult, so he also shot a happier ending. Both were tested with audiences; the happy ending was chosen.

Crossroads was Robert Judd's final film role. He died of stomach cancer in January 1986, two months before the film's theatrical release.

== Music ==
Ry Cooder spent a year working on the film. He later said:

That was an easy film to understand. We’ve all looked at that myth about a white kid going South, and I knew the sign posts along the way. Old time players, juke joints, the lonely roads you go down ... These things are all wordlessly spoken of in blues music, which is an encyclopedia of experience. I had songs in my head that dealt with every scene in Crossroads. To mold them into shape for that film was like Blues 101.

Macchio was taught to play guitar by Arlen Roth in preparation for filming. Roth writes that he and Macchio would work together for two hours per day, after which Macchio would work with his karate instructor to prepare for the forthcoming Karate Kid 2. Macchio initially hoped to be able to play some of the music on screen himself, but came to realize that the difficult pieces the professional guitarists were preparing would be beyond him.

=== Guitar duel ===
The climactic guitar duel between Eugene and Butler was originally intended to be a slide-guitar blues contest, with Cooder appearing on screen as Butler, and with Roth dubbing Eugene's part. Director Walter Hill decided to replace Cooder and produce a harder "boxing match" style battle, with Keith Richards, Frank Zappa, and Stevie Ray Vaughan considered for the part of Butler. He settled on Alcatrazz player Steve Vai, hoping that the fashionable shred guitar style would increase the film's appeal to a wider audience. Cooder was disappointed; he and Roth felt the use of a contemporary musical style was not in keeping with the movie's blues theme, and would badly date the film later.

The director shot an additional duel, which was to appear before the final confrontation. This pitted Vai's Jack Butler against a blues player portrayed by Shuggie Otis; Otis was to lose this, establishing how threatening Butler was. The producers decided not to use this footage in the final film.

Eugene wins the duel by playing a neoclassical metal composition called "Eugene's Trick Bag", which quotes heavily from violin virtuoso Niccolò Paganini's "Caprice No. 5". This reprises parts of the classical playing that William Kanengiser had dubbed for Eugene at the film's beginning; in the final duel, Vai dubs "Eugene's Trick Bag" while Macchio mimed on Eugene's Telecaster. The identity of the red superstrat guitar that Butler plays on-screen became something of a mystery. Guitar World magazine later uncovered that it was a custom Charvel, built either by Grover Jackson or Charvel builder Mike Shannon, and equipped with DiMarzio pickups and a Floyd Rose tremolo. The guitar was Vai's own and, as Butler drops it heavily to the floor, the production team hastily constructed mock-up instruments for the shot. The original guitar, signed by Vai, it is now in the collection of the Hard Rock Cafe company.

Roth later released a recording of the planned final duel, between himself and Cooder, on his SoundCloud channel.

=== Soundtrack album ===
A soundtrack album was released alongside the film, featuring 37 minutes of the film's music. The album does not feature Eugene's classical playing (which was performed by William Kanengiser) nor the final duel with Jack Butler. Vai's playing, including the duel, is featured on his album The Elusive Light and Sound, Vol. 1.

== Critical response ==
Farliner said, "This is as tricky a picture to market as anything. I was the first one who tried to sell the story. I know how tricky it is ... It could be a classic crossover movie. But you could blow that opportunity real quick with a bad campaign." He thought Columbia had an excellent marketing team and liked that the studio spent $6 million on launching it.

According to Ry Cooder, the film "went down the tubes". The film managed a domestic total gross of $5,839,031.

As of 2026, the film had a 74% "fresh" rating on Rotten Tomatoes from 19 reviews. Metacritic, which uses a weighted average, assigned the film a score of 55 out of 100, based on 12 critics, indicating "mixed or average" reviews.

Roger Ebert in his review stated that the movie "borrows so freely and is a reminder of so many other movies that it's a little startling, at the end, to realize how effective the movie is and how original it manages to feel despite all the plunderings." He praised the film's acting and music, giving the movie 3.5 stars out of 4.

=== Awards and nominations ===
Year	Event	Award	Category	Nomination	Result	Ref.
1986	Film Fest Gent	Georges Delerue Prize	Best Original Music	Ry Cooder	Won	
