= Pull Up Some Dust and Sit Down =

Studio album by Ry Cooder
- Released: August 30, 2011
- Recorded: 2010–11
- Studios: Drive-By (North Hollywood); Ocean (Burbank); Wireland (Chatsworth)
- Genres: Americana; American roots
- Length: 61:17
- Label: Nonesuch
- Producer: Ry Cooder

Ry Cooder chronology
I, Flathead (2011)	Pull Up Some Dust and Sit Down (2011)	Election Special (2012)

Singles from Pull Up Some Dust and Sit Down
- 1. "Quicksand" Released: June 29, 2010

Pull Up Some Dust and Sit Down is the fourteenth studio album by American singer-songwriter and multi-instrumentalist Ry Cooder. It was released by Nonesuch Records on August 30, 2011, and written and produced by Cooder, who recorded its songs at Drive-By Studios, Ocean Studios, and Wireland Studios in California. He played various instruments for the project while working alongside studio musicians such as Flaco Jiménez, Juliette Commagere, Robert Francis, and Jim Keltner.

Pull Up Some Dust and Sit Down features topical songs with socio-political subject matter about 21st-century America, including economic disparity, social injustice, politics, and war. Cooder pursued a more political direction with his songwriting, inspired by the Great Recession and protest songs of the past. Its music is rooted in Americana and incorporates traditional styles and musical language from historical sources such as country blues, tejano, and American roots music. The record has been noted by critics for its eclectic musical range, allegorical songs, working-class perspective, and Cooder's sardonic lyrics.

The album was a modest chart success in the United States and performed better in Europe. Cooder expressed disillusionment with the music industry in response to the record's relatively poor commercial performance. Critically, the album was a greater success, earning him widespread acclaim and comparisons to folk singer-songwriter Woody Guthrie. According to Slant Magazine's Joseph Jon Lanthier, "the orchestrated indignation of [the album] incorporated a protean Greek chorus of economic victims and beat Occupy Wall Street to the punch by several weeks."

== Background ==
After an 18-year hiatus from solo projects, Cooder returned with a trilogy of sociopolitical, Southern California-themed albums, comprising Chávez Ravine (2005), My Name Is Buddy (2007), and I, Flathead (2008). The albums examined various disenfranchised peoples through humorous, scholarly lyrics and esoteric musical styles. After completing the trilogy with I, Flathead in 2008, Cooder worked on The Chieftains' 2010 album San Patricio.

== Writing and recording ==
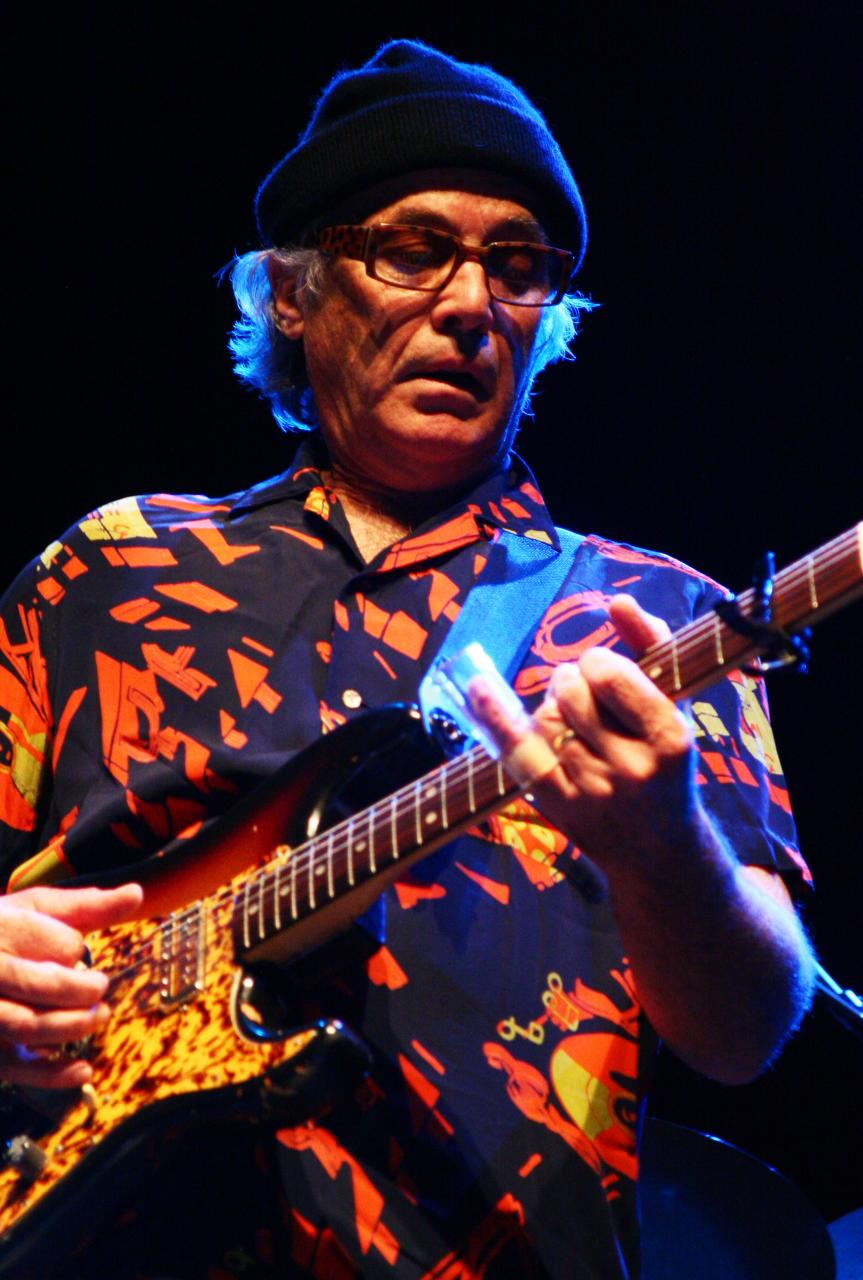
Ry Cooder (pictured in 2009) played the guitar for Pull Up Some Dust and Sit Down, among a number of other instruments.

Cooder was inspired to record Pull Up Some Dust and Sit Down by the Great Recession and past protest songs. In interviews prior to the album's release, Cooder expressed strong anti-Republican and anti-banker sentiments in discussion about the political and economic climate. Before conceiving the album, he wrote and recorded the song "Quicksand" in 2010, as a response to the controversy spurred by Arizona Senate Bill 1070 and other anti-illegal immigration measures in the United States. In an interview for The Australian, Cooder said of his decision to pursue a more political direction with his songwriting:

I was still working on the Flathead record; that was during [George] Bush's time. I was looking at things and paying attention to events, politically. So I started trying to write political songs because it's good to have something you can do other than just sit and fume about everything. After Barack Obama got elected I started thinking about other stories that might be good to do. It occurred to me that the social and political problems that we've been having, well ... it's deja vu all over again, as the man said.

In early 2011, Cooder was inspired to write the song "No Banker Left Behind", and subsequently the rest of the album, by a headline about bankers and other affluent people who had profited from the bank bailouts and resulting recession during the late-2000s. In an interview with Kai Ryssdal on Marketplace, Cooder cited the song as the starting point for writing the album and stated, "'No Banker Left Behind' originated with a line from Robert Scheer's Truthdig blog. I read this pretty regularly, and when I saw this, this metric I thought 'no banker left behind.'" He compared the album's content to Woody Guthrie's songs about the Dust Bowl era during the Great Depression and said of his own songs, "What I like in the idea of these songs is if you follow the logic of each tune — this happened and this happened and you can see that at the end, this is the result, you just didn't see it this way before, you never thought of Wall Street in terms of Jesse James and bilingual heft."

Recording sessions for Pull Up Some Dust and Sit Down took place at Drive-By Studios in North Hollywood, Ocean Studios in Burbank, and Wireland Studios in Chatsworth, California. The album was written and produced entirely by Cooder, except "Lord Tell Me Why", which was co-written by session drummer Jim Keltner. Cooder also worked with vocalist Juliette Commagere, accordionist Flaco Jiménez, bassist Robert Francis, vocalist Arnold McCuller, and drummer Joachim Cooder, Cooder's son. Pull Up Some Dust and Sit Down was mixed by Martin Pradler and mastered by recording engineer Bernie Grundman at his Hollywood studio Grundman Mastering. Most of the album was engineered in Pradler's living room.

== Musical style ==
Pull Up Some Dust and Sit Down's music is rooted in Americana and draws on a number of styles, including blues, folk, ragtime, norteño, rock, and country music. For the songs, Cooder adapted musical language from historical sources and incorporated styles from both North and South American traditions. In his interview on Marketplace, he explained his stylistic approach for Pull Up Some Dust and Sit Down, stating "to me, these musical styles and sounds are narratives as well. I mean everything about them — if it's an accordion, horns, the banda horns for the immigrant tunes — they all are part of the story. And you can see it then, you can imagine the Arizona border that's hot, 120 degrees in the shade, dusty. The banda horns are coming from some truck over there." According to him, musical settings for certain songs were decided based on their respective compositions, such as when "the words would come to me in ¾ time, that meant corrido, that means accordion; banda horns because they’re exciting."

Cooder wanted the music of each song to complement the stories in his lyrics and to serve as homages to particular traditional styles. Cooder said that he did not want to "over-think it" and said of his creative process for each song's distinct style, "It’s taken a long time, but it becomes natural to combine an idea you have or a story you want to tell with whatever seems conducive." Graham Reid of The New Zealand Herald writes that the music "refers to the dustbowl era, rural blues, Tex-Mex (with accordionist Flaco Jimenez) and old-time folk." The Observer's Neil Spencer comments that it is "grounded in the blues, folk and Tex-Mex the guitarist explored in the 1970s, but its songs belong to modern times."

== Lyrics and themes ==
Lyrically, the album focuses on socio-political themes of power and its abuses, the struggle for democracy, the trials of the working class, and the goal of equality, with songs composed as either first-person narratives or allegories. The songs deal with contemporary subject matter and topics such as immigration legislation, the emotional and physical effects of war, the dubiousness of politics, social class and race division, and white flight. Cooder's songwriting is characterized by sardonic lyrics, satire, mordant humor, and wry observations on figures such as bankers, politicians, and militarists. Allmusic's Thom Jurek characterizes it as "overtly political" and comments that "the depth of Cooder's rage is quieter but more direct as the album draws to a close." According to Bud Scoppa of Uncut, the album expands on Cooder's previous trilogy of sociopolitical albums and their "scholarly but humour-laced examinations" and "arcane musical modes". Journalist Alec Wilkinson comments that "what [the album] shares with them is an indignation over the economic and ethical disparities of American life and the destructive and scoundrely meanness of the privileges given to the rich."

Nick Cristiano of The Philadelphia Inquirer writes of the lyrics, "Cooder takes deadly aim at rapacious bankers, warmongers, land barons, and the like, showing the devastating impact of their actions on ordinary folk", adding that "He does this in a manner that mixes the scrappy populism of Woody Guthrie with the first-person narratives of Springsteen in Steinbeckian Ghost of Tom Joad mode." Robin Denselow of The Guardian notes "bleak or thoughtful lyrics [set] against jaunty melodies" and "no elaborate narratives" in the songs, while interpreting the album's motif to be that of "a broken, divided society and the gap between rich and poor, but with the anger matched against humour." Neil Spencer of Uncut calls Pull Up Some Dust and Sit Down "an impassioned portrait of 21st century America and its injustices", adding that "like Guthrie, [Cooder] nails his targets with droll humour while empathising with society's underdogs."

Cooder has brought his longstanding obsession with the Great Depression into the present, where it unfortunately, tragically, enragingly belongs.

— Robert Christgau

Allmusic's Steve Huey asserts that the album "reache[s] all the way back to his earliest recordings for musical inspiration while telling topical stories about corruption — political and social — the erasure and the rewriting of American history, and an emerging class war." Peter Kane of Q compares it to Cooder's 1971 album Into the Purple Valley, which featured Dust Bowl-era songs, and writes that this album's "protest songs for today's messed-up world" are "sly and humorous". Philip Majorins of PopMatters compares the album to other songwriters' "substantial statements" about the American zeitgeist, including Randy Newman's Harps and Angels (2008), Paul Simon's So Beautiful or So What (2011), and Bob Dylan's Modern Times (2006). However, he distinguishes Pull Up Some Dust and Sit Down as "an attempt at the existential, providing an everyman's view of struggle during economic downturn, class disparity, injustice, and abuse of power", calling him "a direct voice of protest, both musically and lyrically, that will not be mistaken for being impressionistic."

== Songs ==
The opening track "No Banker Left Behind" references the financial bailout of 2007 and criticizes bankers and government. Alec Wilkinson of The New Yorker writes that the song "ridicules the considerations extended to the prosperous men and women who grabbed everything not nailed down during the last few years." It features marching rhythms, mandolin and banjo riffs, and electric guitar. Cooder has described the song's rhythm as "a kind of clog-dance beat". "El Corrido Jesse James" is played in waltz time with a horn section and accordion by Flaco Jiménez. The lyrics express a fictitious narrative by American outlaw Jessie James in Heaven, who claims to have never "turned a family from their house" when he was a bank robber. He asks God for his "trusty .44" to persuade bankers to "put that bonus money back where it belongs". Cooder discussed the character's perspective in an interview on BBC Radio 4's Today, stating:

The point here is that Jesse James was a primitive white man from the 19th Century. And in those days the hero was a one-man, one-gun hero. It's a very popular American myth. But what Jesse doesn't realise [in the song] is that while he's been up in heaven, the forces massed against him ... He can't overcome the growth of the corporate, military-industrial equation. He can't walk down Wall Street and shoot up the place. No-one would even pay attention to him. The hero is outnumbered and outgunned. The wagons are circling, but what's he going to do? What's anyone going to do?

"Dirty Chateau"
The song features guitar flourishes, background vocals by Juliette Commagere, and countrypolitan violins. Its lyrics follow an exchange between a reckless rich owner of a big house and his maid, who comes from a community of farm workers.

"Quick Sand" is a shuffling rock song that addresses the plight of illegal immigrants to Arizona. It depicts six migrants travelling through extreme climates in the Sonoran Desert to reach Devil's Highway in an attempt to cross the Mexico – United States border. They journey from Tamaulipas and through the mountains along Devil's Highway. Partway into the journey, the migrants are abandoned by their coyote guide and subsequently lose one another one by one. They experience thirst, hunger, injury, and fear, culminating with the only two surviving migrants being turned away by a vigilante at the border. Cooder said of the route's background and the narrative in an interview, "[I]t's been a migrant trail for 200 years. People go out there and try to do it on foot, but if you make one mistake and go five minutes out of your way, you become disorientated and dehydrated. And they find these mummified bodies out there. The heat has just baked them through. And the people who live through it often refer to having a vision of the Virgin of Guadalupe flying overhead. This is a very common vision when the dehydration sets in."

"Humpty Dumpty World" incorporates the marimba with light reggae and Mariachi influences. The song's lyrics are sung from the perspective of God, who deplores the world he created. He makes note of incitive politicians and craven television commentators, and views it as "a ball of confusion" in the chorus line, "I thought I had built upon a solid rock / But it’s just a Humpty Dumpty World". "Christmas Time This Year" is an anti-war song with a Mexican polka style, with Flaco Jiménez on accordion and Cooder on bajo sexto. Composed as a corrido, the song is about wounded soldiers returning home for Christmas, with dismal lyrics set incongruously to an upbeat Mexican melody. Cooder wrote the song in response to the Walter Reed Army Medical Center neglect scandal and previous stories of neglected soldiers returning from the Iraq War. In "Baby Joined the Army", a young man laments the departure of his girlfriend, who became uninterested in her town and enlisted in the army with the assurance that "If I get killed in battle, I still get paid."

"Lord Tell Me Why"
The rhythmic, gospel-styled song is about a lower class White man's disillusionment. It was co-written by drummer Jim Keltner.

"Dreamer"
The song incorporates Tejano music and accordion by Flaco Jiménez. Its lyrics have the narrator reminiscing his past.

"Lord Tell Me Why" is a gospel song with a rolling funk groove, sung from the perspective of a lower class white man who has become disillusioned with the American dream. His ironic lyrics ask in the chorus, "Lord tell me why a white man / Ain't worth nothin' in this world no more." The guitar-based "I Want My Crown" was recorded with an 11-piece band and has an aggressive blues style, rumba-rock groove, and growling vocals. The song is an indictment of politicians as "Judas men" who sided with oil barons and Republicans, and their greed that leads to war. "I Want My Crown" has been described by one writer as a "Mephistopheles-as-Right-winger character study".

"John Lee Hooker for President" is a blues song in which Cooder narrates as American blues musician John Lee Hooker visiting the White House. Adopting Hooker's style and laconic vocal tone, he decides to run for the presidency after disliking what he observed in his visit, naming Jimmy Reed as vice president, Little Johnny Taylor as Secretary of State, and proposing to have "nine fine-lookin' womens on the Supreme Court". According to Cooder, the song was inspired by blues musician Gus Cannon's 1927 song "Can You Blame the Colored Man", a satirical piece about Booker T. Washington's invitation to the White House by President Theodore Roosevelt in 1901.

"Simple Tools" is a Tex-Mex ballad about the contentment of leading a simple lifestyle, with references to the decline in traditional manual skills and the view of automated work as unfulfilling. Featuring a resounding mix of mandolin and guitar, "If There Is a God" is a satirical narrative about an afterlife in which Heaven is restricted by a government bill to the wealthy. Its lyrics criticize redistricting and Republican Party legislature. The song references "The Bourgeois Blues" by blues and folk musician Lead Belly. In "No Hard Feelings", Cooder sings from the perspective of a lowly prospector who scolds businessmen for dealing with land exclusively in business terms. He dismisses the rich and elite as "ripples" in history and is willing to tolerate them provided that they avoid conflict.

== Marketing and sales ==
Pull Up Some Dust and Sit Down was released by Nonesuch Records on August 30, 2011, in the United States. It was released in the United Kingdom on September 5, and on September 9 in other European countries. Its vinyl LP release was on September 13. The album's lead single, "Quicksand", had been released as a digital download on June 29, 2010. Cooder donated the proceeds from its sales to the Mexican American Legal Defense and Educational Fund. The single's cover artwork, a piece called Nuthin' to See Here, Keep on Movin'!, was designed by visual artist Vincent Valdez, a frequent collaborator with Cooder. Valdez contributed photography to the album's liner booklet. Cooder performed with a 17-piece band at the Great American Music Hall in San Francisco, California on August 31 and September 1, 2011, to promote the album. He was not satisfied with the promotional aspect of the shows, however, and it contributed to his general disillusionment with the music industry, which he reflected on in an interview for The Australian:

We had a 16-piece band and we played great shows to 700 people a night. But none of them bought CDs. None of them. They had a good time but they weren't motivated to buy CDs. I don't understand it because I came up in the time of records. Back then the business ran. You still got the tunes out. It was a crooked business, you could get cheated and there could be crooked accounting, but I still prefer it to this new thing where there is no connection to the audience through radio or retail.

In the week of September 24, 2011, Pull Up Some Dust and Sit Down debuted at number five on the US Billboard Top Folk Albums chart, on which it went on to spend seven weeks. The record also charted at number 123 on the Billboard 200, number 28 on the Top Rock Albums, number 15 on the Tastemaker Albums, a chart that ranks top-selling albums "based on an influential panel of indie stores and small regional chains." In the United Kingdom, Pull Up Some Dust and Sit Down debuted at number 26 on the British albums chart, selling 6,000 copies in its first week there; it spent two weeks on the chart.

== Critical reception ==
Professional ratings
Aggregate scores
Source	Rating
AnyDecentMusic?	8.6/10
Metacritic	92/100
Review scores
Source	Rating
AllMusic	4/5 stars
The Daily Telegraph	5/5 stars
The Guardian	5/5 stars
The Independent	5/5 stars
The Irish Times	4/5 stars
MSN Music (Expert Witness)	A−
The New Zealand Herald	5/5 stars
The Observer	5/5 stars
Q	4/5 stars
Uncut	5/5 stars

Pull Up Some Dust and Sit Down was met with widespread critical acclaim. At Metacritic, which assigns a normalized rating out of 100 to reviews from mainstream publications, the album received an average score of 92, based on 14 reviews.

The album was hailed by Uncut's Nigel Williamson and The Daily Telegraph's Martin Chilton as one of Cooder's best works. AllMusic editor Thom Jurek deemed it the musician's "most overtly political album ... and one of his funniest, most musically compelling ones, too", while Daniel Paton from musicOMH said much of the record was "highly satisfying satire (although also often sensitive and affecting), combining Cooder’s transparent love for a wide range of roots music with his engagement with politics." Andy Gill of The Independent was impressed by how he used similar characters throughout the songs in new ways, calling the album his best since 2005's Chávez Ravine.

Cooder received comparisons to Woody Guthrie in reviews written by Phil Sutcliffe of Mojo, who found the lyrics sharply written, and Neil Spencer from The Observer, who called Cooder "a Woody Guthrie for our times" and the record "a fierce state-of-the-nation album". In the opinion of PopMatters critic Philip Majorins, the record would not have a significant impact because of the public's predominantly commercial tastes and a "cynical" cultural climate, but concluded, "Pull Up Some Dust and Sit Down could have tremendous cathartic power for [those] who are aware of history and its knack for repeating itself. For those who are willing, this is a good place to start an education."

At the end of 2011, Uncut named Pull Up Some Dust and Sit Down the year's 20th best album, while Robert Christgau ranked it number 37 on his list for The Barnes & Noble Review. The record was also nominated for the 2012 Grammy Award for Best Americana Album, while Cooder was nominated in the category of Best Artist for the 2012 Songlines Music Awards.

== Track listing ==
All songs were written and produced by Ry Cooder, except where noted.

No.	Title	Length
1.	"No Banker Left Behind"	3:36
2.	"El Corrido de Jesse James"	4:17
3.	"Quick Sand"	3:17
4.	"Dirty Chateau"	5:29
5.	"Humpty Dumpty World"	4:18
6.	"Christmas Time This Year"	2:49
7.	"Baby Joined the Army"	6:35
8.	"Lord Tell Me Why" (written by Cooder and Jim Keltner)	3:01
9.	"I Want My Crown"	2:37
10.	"John Lee Hooker for President"	6:08
11.	"Dreamer"	5:05
12.	"Simple Tools"	5:07
13.	"If There's a God"	3:06
14.	"No Hard Feelings"	5:52

== Personnel ==
Credits are adapted from the album's liner notes.

=== Musicians ===
- Rene Camacho – bass
- Edgar Castro – bass drums, snare drums, percussion, timbales
- Juliette Commagere – background vocals
- Joachim Cooder – bass, drums
- Ry Cooder – bajo sexto, banjo, bass, composer, guitar, keyboards, mandola, mandolin, marimba, vocals
- Raúl Cuellar – violin
- Terry Evans – background vocals
- Robert Francis – bass
- Arturo Gallardo – alto saxophone, clarinet, saxophone
- Carlos Gonzalez – trumpet
- Willie Green – background vocals
- Jesus Guzman – violin
- Ismael Hernandez – violin
- Flaco Jiménez – accordion
- Jimmy Cuellar – violin
- Jim Keltner – composer, drums
- Arnold McCuller – background vocals
- Pablo Molina – alto horn, sousaphone
- Erasto Robles – trombone

=== Production ===
- Karina Beznicki – production supervisor
- Jacques Demêtre – photography
- Ry Cooder – art direction, producer
- Robert Edridge-Waks – editorial coordinator
- Bernie Grundman – mastering
- William Reagh – photography
- Arthur Moorhead – production coordination
- Martin Pradler – engineer, mixing
- Al Quattrocchi – art direction
- Jeff Smith – art direction
- Susan Titelman – photography
- Paul Turonet – photography
- Vincent Valdez – photography

== Charts ==
Chart (2011)	Peak position
Austrian Albums Chart	74
Belgian Albums Chart (Flanders)	21
British Albums Chart	26
Dutch Albums Chart	24
Finnish Albums Chart	40
Irish Albums Chart	18
Italian Albums Chart	54
New Zealand Albums Chart	28
Norwegian Albums Chart	9
Spanish Albums Chart	77
Swedish Albums Chart	12
Swiss Albums Charts	64
US Billboard 200	123
US Folk Albums (Billboard)	5
US Top Rock Albums (Billboard)	28

== See also ==
- Music and politics
- Occupy movement
