= Joachim Cooder =

American percussionist

- Born: Joachim Herbert Cooder; August 23, 1978 (age 48); Santa Monica, California
- Occupations: Drummer, percussionist, keyboardist
- Website: joachimcooder.com

Joachim Herbert Cooder (born August 23, 1978) is a drummer, percussionist, composer, and keyboardist best known for his collaborations with his father, Ry Cooder.

== Early life ==
Cooder began to play drums at the age of 5, inspired by Jim Keltner. Cooder was brought on tours by his father from a young age, exposing him to prominent musicians.

== Career ==
Cooder played on the Grammy Award winning albums A Meeting by the River (1993) and Buena Vista Social Club (1997). He is seen performing in the accompanying Buena Vista Social Club documentary, released in 1999.

In 2012, he released his debut album Love on a Real Train, collaborating with Petra Haden, Frank Lyon, Inara George, Robert Francis, Matt Costa, Juliette Commagere (Joachim's wife), and Jon Hassell.

== Discography ==
Solo albums

- Love on a Real Train (2012)
- Fuchsia Machu Picchu EP (2018)
- Over That Road I'm Bound: The Songs of Uncle Dave Macon (2020)
- Dreamer's Motel (2024)

Performs on:

- A Meeting by the River (1993)
- Buena Vista Social Club (1997)
- Chanchullo (2000)
- Chávez Ravine (2005)
- My Name Is Buddy (2007)
- I, Flathead (2008)
- Pull Up Some Dust and Sit Down (2011)
- Election Special (2012)
- The Prodigal Son (2018)
- Get on board (2022)
