= I, Flathead =

Studio album by Ry Cooder
- Released: June 23, 2008
- Recorded: at Little Pink Studio, Los Angeles
- Genres: Americana, roots rock, Tex-Mex, country rock, western swing
- Length: 53:08
- Label: Nonesuch
- Producer: Ry Cooder

Ry Cooder chronology
My Name Is Buddy (2007)	I, Flathead (2008)	Pull Up Some Dust and Sit Down (2011)

Professional ratings
Review scores
Source	Rating
Allmusic	link
Billboard	(not rated) link

I, Flathead: The Songs of Kash Buk and the Klowns is the fourteenth studio album by Ry Cooder. It is the final concept album by Ry Cooder. It is the third in his "California trilogy", which began with Chávez Ravine (2005) and My Name Is Buddy (2007).

The Deluxe Edition of the album is accompanied by a 104-page hardback book which included a CD in paper pocket, a novella (on 97 pages) and song lyrics.

The title is a play on the Isaac Asimov novel "I, Robot", but the flathead in question is the Ford Flathead engine.

== Track listing ==
All tracks composed by Ry Cooder; except where indicated

1. "Drive Like I Never Been Hurt" (Ry Cooder, Joachim Cooder) - 4:07
2. "Waitin' for Some Girl" - 3:48
3. "Johnny Cash" - 3:08
4. "Can I Smoke in Here?" - 4:19
5. "Steel Guitar Heaven" - 3:40
6. "Ridin' with the Blues" - 3:01
7. "Pink-O Boogie" - 3:05
8. "Fernando Sez" - 4:44
9. "Spayed Kooley" - 2:09
10. "Filipino Dancehall Girl" - 3:54
11. "My Dwarf is Getting Tired" - 3:59
12. "Flathead One More Time" (Ry Cooder, Joachim Cooder, Jared Smith) - 3:12
13. "5000 Country Music Songs" - 6:41
14. "Little Trona Girl" (Ry Cooder, Joachim Cooder) - 3:13

== Personnel ==
=== Musicians ===
- Gil Bernal – Tenor saxophone
- Ron Blake – Trumpet
- Rene Camacho – Double bass
- Juliette Commagere – Vocals (14)
- Joachim Cooder – Drums, Timbales
- Ry Cooder – Vocals, Guitars, Bass guitar, Mandolin, Electric piano, Producer, Package Design, Laud
- Jesús Guzmán – Arranger, String Arrangements
- Jon Hassell – Trumpet
- Flaco Jiménez – Accordion
- Jim Keltner – Drums
- Martin Pradler – Drums, Electric piano, Engineer, Mixing, Package Design
- Jared Smith – Keyboards
- Francisco Torres – Trombone
- Mariachi Los Campreros

=== Production ===
- Producer – Ry Cooder

Recorded & mixed by Martin Pradler

- Production Supervisor, Karina Benznicki
- Production Coordination, Eli Cane
- Editorial Coordinator, Ronen Givony
- Mastering by Stephen Marcussen
- Assistant, Alex Pavlides

=== Artwork ===
- Cover photo by Robert Wilson Kellogg

== Releases ==
year	format	label	catalog #
2007	CD	Nonesuch	511762

== Further reading / listening ==
- "Cooder's Buddy Revives Tales of Bygone America", Morning Edition, NPR, March 6, 2007
- "From the Dust", The Observer, March 4, 2007
