= Save the Children (disambiguation) =

Save the Children is a child-welfare non-profit organisation founded in London in 1919.

Save the Children may also refer to:

- Save the Children International, or any of its 30 national members, including:
  - Save the Children Australia
  - Save the Children India (Bal Raksha Bharat)
  - Save the Children Jordan
  - Save the Children USA

== Music ==
- "Save the Children" (song), first recorded on What's Going On by Marvin Gaye
- Save the Children (album), 1989, and its title track
- Save the Children (The Intruders album), 1973
- Best Hits Live: Save the Children Speed Live 2003, a 2004 live album by Speed
- "Save the Children", a song from Pieces of a Man by Gil Scott-Heron
- "Save the Children", a song from B4.Da.$$ by Joey Badass
- "Save the Children", a song from My Tribute by Carola Häggkvist

== Other ==
- Save the Children (film), a 1973 documentary about the 1972 Operation PUSH exposition
- The last sentence of Lu Xun's short story A Madman's Diary
- A hashtag of the QAnon movement

== See also ==
- The Flood: Who Will Save Our Children?, a 1993 U.S. television movie
- International Save the Children Union, a former Geneva-based international organisation of children's welfare organisations
- Operation Save Our Children, a 2011 U.S. operation against child pornography
- Save Our Children, a campaign against gay rights founded in 1977
- Save the German Children Society, an Irish aid group founded in 1946
- Save the Kids token, a 2021 cryptocurrency pump and dump scheme
- "Think of the children", a cliché
