= Together (The Intruders song) =

1967 single by The Intruders

Single by The Intruders
- B-side: "Up and Down the Ladder"
- Released: April 1967
- Genre: R&B
- Length: 2:47
- Label: Gamble
- Songwriters: Kenny Gamble, Leon Huff

The Intruders singles chronology
"We'll Be United" (1966)	"Together" (1967)	"Baby I'm Lonely / A Love That's Real" (1967)

"Together"

Single by Tierra
- B-side: "Zoot Suit Boogie/In the Mood Theme"
- Released: November 1980
- Genre: R&B
- Length: 4:24
- Label: Boardwalk
- Songwriters: Kenny Gamble, Leon Huff
- Producer: Rudy Salas

Tierra singles chronology
"Together" (1980)	"Memories" (1981)

"Together" is a 1967 song originally recorded and performed by The Intruders. The song reached number 48 on the US Billboard Hot 100 and spent nine weeks on the chart. It was their second of 14 chart hits.

== Tierra remake ==
In 1980, "Together" was remade by Tierra with their rendition being released as a single and reaching number 18 on the US Billboard Hot 100. The song spent five months on the chart. It was a number-one record on Los Angeles radio.

== Charts ==
=== Year-end charts ===
The Intruders original

Chart (1967)	Peak position
US Billboard Hot 100	48
US R&B (Billboard)	9
US Cash Box Top 100	57

Tierra cover

Chart (1980–1981)	Peak position
US Billboard Hot 100	18
US Adult Contemporary (Billboard)	30
US R&B Singles (Billboard)	9
US Cash Box Top 100	23

Chart (1981)	Rank
US Billboard Hot 100	53
US R&B (Billboard)	23
