= Get Rhythm (Ry Cooder album) =

Studio album by Ry Cooder
- Released: November 1987
- Studios: Ocean Way, Los Angeles
- Genre: Roots rock
- Length: 40:43
- Label: Warner Bros.
- Producer: Ry Cooder

Ry Cooder chronology
The Slide Area (1982)	Get Rhythm (1987)	Chávez Ravine (2005)

Professional ratings
Review scores
Source	Rating
AllMusic	3/5 stars
Robert Christgau	B+
New Musical Express	4/10

Get Rhythm is a studio album by Ry Cooder, released in 1987. Following its release, Cooder took an extended break from his solo album career. His next solo studio album, Chávez Ravine, was released in 2005.

== Background ==
The album was Cooder's first solo release in approximately five years, following The Slide Area (1982). During this period, he worked on the soundtracks for several films, including The Long Riders, Southern Comfort, Paris, Texas and Alamo Bay.

In a 1987 interview with Los Angeles Times, Cooder explained that working on film scores had allowed him to explore new guitar sounds and develop his approach to composition. He also noted that film work had taught him to make decisions more quickly and work more efficiently, experiences that subsequently influenced his music production.

The album was recorded at Ocean Way Recording in Los Angeles, with Cooder serving as producer. Ed Cherney handled the recording and mixing. Musically, the album combines various elements of Americana music, including blues, folk music, Tejano music, rhythm and blues, gospel music, Caribbean music, funk and rock and roll.

The title track, "Get Rhythm", is a reinterpretation of a song written by Johnny Cash. "Across the Borderline" was co-written by Cooder, John Hiatt and Jim Dickinson for the 1982 film The Border. On the album version, Harry Dean Stanton performs the song alongside Cooder, and the recording also includes sections with Spanish-language lyrics.

== Track listing ==
1. "Get Rhythm" (Johnny Cash)
2. "Low Commotion" (Ry Cooder, Jim Keltner)
3. "Going Back to Okinawa" (Ry Cooder)
4. "Thirteen Question Method" (Chuck Berry)
5. "Women Will Rule the World" (Raymond Quevedo)
6. "All Shook Up" (Elvis Presley, Otis Blackwell)
7. "I Can Tell by the Way You Smell" (Walter Davis)
8. "Across the Borderline" (Ry Cooder, Jim Dickinson, John Hiatt)
9. "Let's Have a Ball" (Allen Bunn)

== Charts ==
Chart (1987)	Peak position
Australia (Kent Music Report)	29
Canada Top Albums/CDs (RPM)	34

== Personnel ==
- Ry Cooder - guitar, vocals, arrangements
- Van Dyke Parks - keyboards
- Flaco Jiménez - accordion
- Steve Douglas - saxophone
- Jorge Calderón - bass guitar
- Buell Neidlinger - acoustic bass on 2, 6, 8
- Jim Keltner - drums
- Miguel Cruz - percussion
- Bobby King, Terry Evans, Arnold McCuller, Willie Greene Jr. - backing vocals
- Larry Blackmon - backing vocals on "All Shook Up"
- Harry Dean Stanton - backing vocals on "Across the Borderline"

Technical

- Ed Cherney - recording
- Steven M. Martin - art direction
- Kalan Brunink - black velvet painting
