= Bobby Espinosa =

American musician (1949–2010)

- Born: April 29, 1949; Los Angeles, California, U.S.
- Died: February 27, 2010 (aged 60) Los Angeles, California, U.S.
- Genres: Latin rock
- Instrument: Organ
- Years active: 1965–2010
- Formerly of: Mickey & The Invaders, The VIPs, El Chicano, Thee Rhythm Kings

Bobby Espinosa (April 29, 1949 – February 27, 2010) was an influential and important part of the Latin rock scene in Los Angeles from the late 1960s to the 2000s. He was a founding member of El Chicano.

== Background ==
Espinosa was born on April 29, 1949, in Los Angeles County. At a young age he became very influenced by Salsa music. His parents, especially his mother would dance to Tito Puente.

=== Death ===
Having been ill for some time, Espinosa died on February 27, 2010, aged 60, at White Memorial hospital in East Los Angeles. He was survived by his son Bobby Espinosa Jr. and daughter Reyna Espinosa, six grandchildren as well as other family members that include a brother and sister.

== Musical career ==
Espinosa was said to have his own unique sound. He had a percussive approach to playing the Hammond B-3 organ for which he is recognized by some of his peers, people and fans from Los Angeles. He is regarded as an icon in the Chicano community.

=== Early days ===
In the 1960s he was a member of East L.A. Surf group Mickey & The Invaders playing organ. The band which was previously called Mickey & The Cavaliers, was led by Mike James Aversa a.k.a. Mickey. He left the band in the mid-1960s to join the VIPs, a Chicano band. This group which was formed in 1965 by bass player Freddie Sanchez was a night club covers band. Espinosa was the first member brought into the band by Sanchez.

=== El Chicano ===
In 1969, the VIPs evolved into what became known as El Chicano. For forty years Espinosa was a force in the group. He also produced and wrote some of their material. He also played on every recording the group made. The recognizable sound of El Chicano mainly came from Espinosa's B-3 organ and the Wes Montgomery styled guitar playing of Mickey Lespron.

In the 1980s a legal argument between Espinosa and fellow co-founder Mickey Lespron developed. This was over the ownership of the El Chicano name. As a result, there was a temporary halt on the group's career and the discontinuation of their association with Columbia.

In a JazzTimes review of the Latin Legends Live album that featured Malo, El Chicano and Tierra, reviewer Marcela Breton referred to Espinosa's playing as the standout on the three El Chicano tracks.

=== Post El Chicano and other ===
In 1998, the album Painting the Moment was released. Even though the album is credited with the El Chicano name, it is regarded as a solo album by Espinosa. In later years he guested on some artists recordings including Si Se Puede recorded in 1996 by Tapestree, a group made up of veterans of the L.A. music scene. Also the debut album by Thee Rhythm Kings, Killing Time. In 2003, he was at one of Gilbert Esquivel's shows in his early days in Hollywood. He was on stage with Chicano singer Rocky Padilla, Sal Rodriguez from the group WAR and Isaac Avila from Tierra.

He was still playing music in spite of health issues right up until early 2010. He also played a concert at the Inland Empire with former bandmate and Tierra founder Rudy Salas at that time.

He has been inducted into the "Hammond Heroes" society. He at the time had the distinction of being the only Latin organist recognized for his blues, Latin and jazz style.

Francisco "Pancho" Tomaselli who was the bass player for the group WAR jammed with Espinosa. He recalled his first time playing "Viva Tirado" was with him.

== Documentary ==
- El Chicano: In the Eye of the Storm... Himself - (2009)
- Hammond Heroes... Himself

== Discography ==
- Painting the Moment - Thump Records - (1998)

=== Appears on ===
- Con Safos - "C/S" - Los Angelinos (The Eastside Renaissance) - Zyanya Records – RNLP 062 - (1983) (various artists album)
- Tapestree - Si Se Puede (You Can Make It) - (1996)
- Thee Rhythm Kings - Killing Time.
