= Rudy Regalado =

Rudy Regalado may refer to:

- Rudy Regalado (baseball)
- Rudy Regalado (musician)
