= Chávez Ravine (album) =

Studio album by Ry Cooder
- Released: June 7, 2005
- Recorded: Village Recorders, Sound City Studios
- Genre: Chicano rock Tex-Mex; Latin/Contemporary Folk; Latin jazz
- Length: 70:08
- Label: Nonesuch
- Producer: Ry Cooder

Ry Cooder chronology
Get Rhythm (1987)	Chávez Ravine (2005)	My Name Is Buddy (2007)

Professional ratings
Aggregate scores
Source	Rating
Metacritic	86/100
Review scores
Source	Rating
AllMusic	4.5/5 stars
Entertainment Weekly	A−
The Guardian	4/5 stars
Los Angeles Times	3.5/4 stars
Mojo	4/5 stars
Paste	4.5/5 stars
Q	4/5 stars
Rolling Stone	3.5/5 stars
Tiny Mix Tapes	4.5/5 stars
Uncut	8/10

Chávez Ravine: A Record by Ry Cooder is the twelfth studio album by Ry Cooder. It is the first concept album and historical album by Ry Cooder which tells the story of Chávez Ravine, a Mexican-American community demolished in the 1950s in order to build public housing. The housing was never built. Ultimately the Brooklyn Dodgers built a stadium on the site as part of their move to Los Angeles.

Chávez Ravine was nominated for "Grammy Award for Best Contemporary Folk Album" in 2006.

== Track listing ==
1. "Poor Man's Shangri-La" (Ry Cooder, William Garcia, Gene Aguilera) – 5:28
  - Ry Cooder – vocal, guitar, organ, tres
  - Juliette Commagere – vocal
  - Jim Keltner – drums
  - Mike Elizondo – bass
  - Joachim Cooder – timbales
2. "Onda Callejera" (David Hidalgo, William Garcia) – 3:50
  - Little Willie G. – vocal
  - Juliette Commagere, Carla Commagere – vocal chorus
  - Ry Cooder – guitar, laud
  - Joachim Cooder – percussion
  - Mike Elizondo – bass
  - Joe Rotondi – piano
  - Gil Bernal – tenor saxophone
  - Mike Bolger – trumpet
  - Ledward Kaapana – guitar
3. "Don't Call Me Red" (Ry Cooder) – 4:58 This song is about Frank Wilkinson
  - Ry Cooder – vocal, guitar
  - Juliette and Carla Commagere – vocal chorus
  - Jon Hassell – trumpet
  - Jim Keltner – bongos
  - Joachim Cooder – timbales
  - Mike Elizondo – bass
4. "Corrido de Boxeo" (Lalo Guerrero) – 3:21
  - Lalo Guerrero – vocal
  - Ry Cooder – bajo sexto, guitar
  - Joachim Cooder – drums
  - Mike Elizondo – bass
  - Joe Rotondi – piano
  - Flaco Jiménez – accordion
5. "Muy Fifí" (William Garcia, Joachim Cooder, Juliette Commagere) – 4:03
  - Ersi Arvizu – vocal
  - Little Willie G., Jacob Garcia – vocal chorus
  - Ry Cooder – guitar
  - Joachim Cooder – drums, sampling
  - Mike Elizondo – bass
  - Chucho Valdés – piano
6. "Los Chucos Suaves" (Lalo Guerrero) – 3:08
  - Lalo Guerrero – vocal
  - Ry Cooder – guitar
  - Jim Keltner – drums
  - Mike Elizondo – bass
  - Joe Rotondi – piano
  - Gil Bernal – tenor sax
7. "Chinito Chinito" (Felguerez/Diaz) – 4:52
  - Juliette Commagere – vocal
  - Carla Commagere – vocal
  - Ry Cooder – guitar
  - Joachim Cooder – drums
  - Jared Smith – bass
  - Mike Bolger – organ, trumpet, valve trombone
  - Joe Rotondi – piano
8. "3 Cool Cats" (Jerry Leiber, Mike Stoller) – 2:57
  - Little Willie G. – vocal
  - Rudy Salas, Michael Guerra, Juliette Commagere, Carla Commagere – vocal chorus
  - Ry Cooder – guitar
  - Jim Keltner – drums
  - Joachim Cooder – timbales
  - Jared Smith – bass
  - Joe Rotondi – piano
  - Gil Bernal – tenor sax
  - Mike Bolger – organ
9. "El U.F.O. Cayó" (Juliette Commagere, Ry Cooder, Joachim Cooder, Jared Smith) – 8:22
  - Juliette Commagere – vocal
  - Don Tosti – vocal
  - Ry Cooder – tres
  - Mike Elizondo – bass
  - Joachim Cooder – Sampling
  - Jared Smith – keyboard
10. "It's Just Work for Me" (Ry Cooder) – 5:54
  - Ry Cooder – vocal, guitar
  - Joachim Cooder – drums
  - Mike Elizondo – bass
11. "In My Town" (Ry Cooder) – 5:40
  - Ry Cooder – vocal, guitar
  - Sunny D. Levine – drum programming
  - Jacky Terrasson – piano
12. "Ejército Militar" (Rita Arvizu) – 3:16
  - Ersi Arvizu – vocal
  - Rosella Arvizu – vocal
  - Ry Cooder – bajo sexto, guitar
  - Joachim Cooder – drums
  - Mike Elizondo – bass
  - Flaco Jiménez – accordion
13. "Barrio Viejo" (Lalo Guerrero) – 4:42
  - Lalo Guerrero – vocal, guitar
  - Flaco Jiménez – accordion
  - Joachim Cooder – drums
  - Mike Elizondo – bass
  - Ledward Kaapana – guitar
14. "3rd Base, Dodger Stadium" (Ry Cooder, William Garcia, Joe Kevany) – 5:45
  - Bla Pahinui – vocal, guitar, ukulele
  - Ry Cooder – guitar
  - Joachim Cooder – drums
  - Mike Elizondo – bass
  - Joe Rotondi – piano
  - Gil Bernal – tenor sax
  - Mike Bolger – trumpet, valve trombone
  - Ledward Kaapana – guitar
15. "Soy Luz y Sombra" (The Cloud Forest poem; music by William Garcia, Joachim Cooder, Ry Cooder) – 3:15
  - Ersi Arvizu – vocal
  - Little Willie G. – vocal
  - Juliette Commagere – vocal
  - Ry Cooder – guitar
  - Joachim Cooder – drums, sampling
  - Jared Smith – bass
  - David Hidalgo – guitar

== Charts ==
Chart (2005)	Peak position
Australian Albums (ARIA Charts)	68
