= I'll Always Love My Mama =

Single by The Intruders

from the album Save the Children
- Released: 1973
- Genre: R&B, soul, proto-disco
- Length: 6:39
- Label: Gamble
- Songwriters: Gamble & Huff; McFadden & Whitehead (co-writers)

The Intruders singles chronology
| "(Win, Place or Show) She's a Winner" (1972) | "I'll Always Love My Mama" (1973) | "I Wanna Know Your Name" (1973) |

"I'll Always Love My Mama" is a 1973 single by the Philly soul group The Intruders. Released from their album Save the Children, the single is a song commonly played on Mother's Day.

Written by Gamble & Huff and co-written by McFadden & Whitehead, the song reached #36 on the pop chart and #6 on the R&B charts in the summer of 1973. It was recorded as a long LP track, which was broken down into Parts 1 and 2 for the single release. The song was inspired by Kenny Gamble's mother, Ruby, who died in 2012. It was used during the credits of The Simpsons episode "Moe Letter Blues".
