= Bobby Starr =

American R&B and soul singer (1937–2022)

Bobby Starr (January 19, 1937 – March 17, 2022) was an American R&B and soul singer; who was lead singer for the R&B group, The Intruders.

== Biography ==
Born and raised in Baltimore, Maryland, Bobby Starr toured with a variety of vocal groups as a teen before forming Bobby Starr and the Versatilles. His recordings with the five member vocal group include the single "Fanny, Fanny." While on tour he met Philadelphia recording group the Intruders. Noted for his similar sound to The Intruders' lead singer Samuel Brown, the group recruited Starr to replace Brown when he opted out to spend time with his family. Starr's addition to The Intruders in 1970 reignited their string of hit singles including tracks from the "When We Get Married" album. His leads include a cover of Dusty Springfield's "A Brand New Me" and the album version of "When We Get Married". Starr's first single release with the Intruders on the "Gamble" record label in 1971 was "I'm Girl Scoutin". Starr made his national television debut with The Intruders on November 13, 1971 performing "Cowboys to Girls" and "I Bet He Don't Love You" on Soul Train. The Intruders disbanded in the 1980s and reformed under the direction of Glenn Montgomery. Bobby Starr returned as lead singer and the group continues to tour today. He is featured on tour with The Intruders on the "Love Train: Sound of Philadelphia" concert series. Bobby Starr's charitable endeavors include support for education and public television. His recent appearances include the P.B.S TV special "Superstars of 70's Soul Live."

Starr died on March 17, 2022, at the age of 85.

== Discography ==
=== Bobby Starr and the Versatiles Singles ===
- "Fanny, Fanny" (1968)

=== The Intruders Singles ===
- "When We Get Married" (album version) (1970)
- "This Is My Love Song" (1970)
- "I'm Girl Scoutin" (1971)
- "I Bet He Don't Love You" (1971)
- "(Win Place or Show) She's a Winner" (1973)
- "Talking About Pop" (2002)
- "How Long Has It Been" (2002)

=== Albums with the Intruders ===
- "When We Get Married" (Gamble 1970)
