= This Is My Life (soundtrack) =

This Is My Life (Music from the Motion Picture)

Soundtrack album by Carly Simon
- Released: April 14, 1992
- Studio: Right Track Recording, Bubble Hill and The Hit Factory (New York City, New York)
- Genre: Adult contemporary
- Length: 37:30
- Label: Qwest
- Producer: Frank Filipetti; Carly Simon; Andy Goldmark; Russ Kunkel

Carly Simon chronology
Have You Seen Me Lately (1990)	This Is My Life (Music from the Motion Picture) (1992)	Romulus Hunt: A Family Opera (1993)

Singles from This Is My Life (Music from the Motion Picture)
- 1. "Love of My Life" Released: 1992

Professional ratings
Review scores
Source	Rating
AllMusic	2/5 stars

This Is My Life (Music from the Motion Picture) is a soundtrack album by the American singer-songwriter Carly Simon. It is the soundtrack to the 1992 Nora Ephron film This Is My Life, released by Qwest Records, on April 14, 1992.

The album consists of lyrical and instrumental songs written and performed by Simon. The single "Love of My Life" became a Billboard Adult Contemporary chart hit, peaking at No. 16, and remaining on the chart for 15 weeks. Simon made a music video for the song, which featured her son Ben Taylor, along with clips from the film. The song has been included on several compilations of Simon's work, including the three-disc box set Clouds in My Coffee (1995), the two-disc Anthology (2002), and the single-disc Reflections: Carly Simon's Greatest Hits (2004).

The song "The Night Before Christmas" was also featured in the Ephron directed 1994 film Mixed Nuts, and included on its soundtrack album. Simon also included the song on her three-CD box set Clouds in My Coffee the following year, and it was additionally released as a promo CD single. In 2010, the song was included on the Borders special limited edition of Simon's 2002 album Christmas Is Almost Here.

== Track listing ==
Credits adapted from the album's liner notes.

No.	Title	Writer(s)	Length
1.	"Love of My Life"	Carly Simon	3:35
2.	"Back the Way (Dottie's Point of View)"	Simon	4:51
3.	"Moving Day"	Simon	1:23
4.	"Easy on the Eyes"	Simon; Andy Goldmark	4:44
5.	"Walking and Kissing"	Simon	1:08
6.	"The Show Must Go On"	Simon	3:46
7.	"Love of My Life (Toots)"	Simon	2:18
8.	"Back the Way (Girls' Point of View)"	Simon	2:58
9.	"Little Troupers"	Simon	0:37
10.	"The Night Before Christmas"	Simon	3:41
11.	"This Is My Life Suite: Pleasure and Pain/Coming Home/Uncle Peter"	Simon	4:44
12.	"Love of My Life (Drive to the City)"	Simon	3:45
Total length:			37:30

== Credits ==
=== Musicians ===
- Carly Simon – keyboards, acoustic guitar, whistle
- Teese Gohl – acoustic piano, synthesizers, orchestra arrangements and conductor
- Andy Goldmark – synthesizers (4)
- Jimmy Ryan – acoustic guitar, electric guitar, ukulele
- Ben Taylor – additional acoustic guitar (1, 10)
- Will Lee – bass
- Paul Samwell-Smith – bass (10)
- Andy Newmark – drums
- Russ Kunkel – drums (4, 10)
- Richie Morales – drums (9)
- Jamey Haddad – percussion (1)
- Charles McCracken – cello (1)
- Jim Pugh – trombone (6)
- Randy Brecker – trumpet (6)
- Toots Thielemans – harmonica (7)

Vocalists

- Carly Simon – vocals
- Will Lee – vocals

Background vocalists

- Christy Baron – backing vocals (6)
- Anne Brown – backing vocals (6)
- Michael DeVries – backing vocals (6)
- David Elledge – backing vocals
- Joanna Glushak – backing vocals (6)
- Kathi Moss – backing vocals (6)
- Peter Samuel – backing vocals (6)
- Martin Vidnovic – backing vocals (6)
- Marcus Bishop-Wright – backing vocals (10)
- Joel Chaikin – backing vocals (10)
- Parker Conrad – backing vocals (10)
- Diane Garisto – backing vocals (10)
- Melody Kay – backing vocals (10)
- Curtis King – backing vocals (10)
- Kimberly Mahon – backing vocals (10)
- Sally Taylor – backing vocals (10)
- Marty Thomas – backing vocals (10)
- Brenda White-King – backing vocals (10)
- Keith Evans – backing vocals (11)
- Frank Filipetti – backing vocals (11)
- Teese Gohl – backing vocals (11)
- Will Lee – backing vocals (11)
- Jimmy Ryan – backing vocals (11)
- Carly Simon – backing vocals (11)

=== Production ===
- Carly Simon – producer
- Frank Filipetti – producer
- Andy Goldmark – producer (4)
- Russ Kunkel – producer (10)
- Elliot Lurie – music supervision
- Matthew Walden – music supervision
- Bibi Green – production coordinator
- Kevin Hosmann – art direction, design
- Sherry Etheredge – photography (shadow background)
- Pam Frank – photography (Carly Simon)
- Kerry Hayes – photography (movie stills)

Technical credits

- Ted Jensen – mastering at Sterling Sound (New York, NY)
- Frank Filipetti – recording, mixing (2–12)
- Tom Lord-Alge – mixing (1)
- James P. Nichols – additional recording
- Vincent Caro – assistant engineer
- Keith Evans – assistant engineer
- Lolly Grodner – assistant engineer
- Major Little – assistant engineer
- Doug McKean – assistant engineer
- Brian Pollack – assistant engineer
- Eric Stark – assistant engineer
- Gary Tole – assistant engineer

== Charts ==
Singles – Billboard (United States)

Year	Single	Chart	Position
1992	"Love of My Life"	Adult Contemporary	16
