= El Chicano =

American brown-eyed soul group

- Origin: Los Angeles, California, U.S.
- Genres: Brown-eyed soul, chicano rock, funk
- Years active: 1969–Present
- Label: MCA
- Past members: Bobby Espinosa; Freddie Sanchez; Mickey Lespron; Andre Baeza; John De Luna

El Chicano is an American brown-eyed soul group from Los Angeles, California, whose style incorporates various modern music genres including rock, funk, soul, blues, jazz, and salsa. The group's name comes from the word Chicano, a term for United States citizens of typically Mexican descent.

== History ==
El Chicano, originally formed by Freddie Sanchez under the name The VIP's arose during a period of increasing Chicano consciousness in America. Their initial hit, "Viva Tirado", was a jazzy soul rock rendition of Gerald Wilson's original song about a bullfighter. The song did very well on Los Angeles radio and remained #1 for thirteen straight weeks. Other notable tracks recorded by El Chicano are the funky "Tell Her She's Lovely" as well as a cover of Van Morrison's 1967 hit "Brown Eyed Girl".

Original members of El Chicano include Bobby Espinosa, Freddie Sanchez, Mickey Lespron, Andre Baeza, and John De Luna. The lead singer for some years was Ersi Arvizu. During the 1970s, new members Rudy Regalado, Max Garduno, Danny Lamonte, Brian Magness, Jerry Salas, and Joe Pererria joined the group.

On their 1970 album Viva Tirado the group covered Herbie Hancock's jazz standard "Cantaloupe Island". The song was one of nine on the album, which included the hit single "Viva Tirado" that went gold.

El Chicano continues to be active with a combination of original and new members. They performed on the 2009 PBS pledge break special, Trini Lopez Presents 'The Legends of Latin Rock' , along with Thee Midniters, Tierra, and Gregg Rolie (of Santana and Journey).

Latin percussionist Walfredo Reyes Jr., formerly of Santana, recorded with the band from 2010 to 2012.

Original keyboardist Bobby Espinosa ‒ noted for playing Hammond organ on some El Chicano tracks ‒ died on February 27, 2010. Former percussionist Rudy Regalado, who spent twelve years with the band, died on November 4, 2010.

== Members ==
- Ersi Arvizu, lead vocals – 1970
- Eddie Avila, drums (2010–present)
- Andre Baeza, congas – 1970
- John De Luna, drums – 1970
- Bobby Espinosa, organ – 1970; died February 27, 2010
- Max Garduno, congas
- Danny Lamonte, drums
- Mickey Lespron, guitar – 1970
- Brian Magness, bass
- Joe Perreria, bass
- Rudy Regalado, timbales – joined c. 1971; died November 4, 2010
- Walfredo "Wally" Reyes, Jr., drums, congas (2010–2012)
- Joseph Baeza, congas (2011–2013); died October 18, 2016
- David "Chango" Chavez, congas (2015–present)
- Jerry Salas, lead vocals, guitar – joined in 1973
- Rudy Salas, vocals – 1970; died December 29, 2020
- Steve Salas, vocals – 1970; died February 10, 2022
- Freddie Sanchez, bass – 1970

== Discography ==
The band recorded under Kapp Records and MCA Records; in Mexico it was distributed MCA and Orfeón.

=== Albums ===
Year	Title	US	US R&B	US Jazz
1970	Viva Tirado	51	19	8
1971	Revolución	178	—	17
1972	Celebration	173	—	—
1973	El Chicano	162	—	—
1974	Cinco	194	—	—
1975	The Best of Everything	—	—	—
1976	Pyramid of Love and Friends	—	—	—
1998	Painting the Moment	—	—	—

=== Main singles ===
Year	Title	US	US R&B	Easy Listening	AUS
1970	"Viva Tirado – Part I"	28	20	10	—
1970	"Eleanor Rigby"	115	—	—	—
1971	"Cubano Chant"	—	—	—	—
1972	"Brown Eyed Girl"	45	—	—	87
1972	"Satisfy Me Woman"	—	—	—	—
1973	"Last Tango in Paris"	—	—	—	—
1973	"Tell Her She's Lovely"	40	98	22	54
1975	"Baretta's Theme"	—	—	—	—
1983	"Do You Want Me"	—	—	—	—
1984	"Let Me Dance with You"	—	—	—	—

== See also ==
- Chicano rock
