= Christmas Is Almost Here =

Studio album by Carly Simon
- Released: October 22, 2002
- Recorded: in Room 139, The Peninsula Hotel, Beverly Hills, CA January 2002
- Studio: Record Plant (Hollywood, California); Parr Audio (Martha's Vineyard)
- Genre: Christmas
- Length: 36:40
- Label: Rhino
- Producer: Don Was; Carly Simon

Carly Simon chronology
The Bedroom Tapes (2000)	Christmas Is Almost Here (2002)	Anthology (2002)

Christmas Is Almost Here is the 19th studio album, and first Christmas album, by American singer-songwriter Carly Simon, released by Rhino Entertainment, on October 22, 2002.

Featuring a mixture of seasonal classics and original compositions, the album features Willie Nelson in a duet on "Pretty Paper", and Simon's son Ben Taylor in a duet on "God Rest Ye Merry, Gentlemen". Simon's former brother-in-law Livingston Taylor wrote the title track. Simon co-wrote the track "Heaven" with her sister Lucy Simon. "The Land of Christmas (Mary)" was written by Simon the night before recording on the album began.

The album peaked at No. 14 on the U.S. Billboard Top Holiday Albums chart. Simon embarked on a promotional tour in support of the album that included a handful of television appearances, including Good Morning America, The Caroline Rhea Show, Live with Regis and Kelly, Howard Stern, and The Today Show. Simon's son, Ben Taylor, accompanied her on many of these promotional appearances.

== Reception ==
Professional ratings
Review scores
Source	Rating
AllMusic	2.5/5 stars

AllMusic's Richie Unterberger rated the album 21/2-stars-out-of-5 and wrote: "Christmas albums by major veteran pop stars long past their commercial prime are usually not highlights of their catalogs, and for the most part this isn't an exception", but "this is definitely an above-average holiday offering. Don Was' presence as co-producer ensures some creativity and diversity to the sound, as do the contributions of top session players like Jim Keltner, Billy Preston, and Benmont Tench. Simon's vocals are strong, and one of the two originals, "The Land of Christmas (Mary)," is not only pretty straight-ahead and gutsy, but sounds a lot better than most of the contemporary material she did on her secular records in the 1980s and 1990s. It's not an exciting release by any means, but it's not as immediately forgettable as many holiday efforts by similar performers are."

Entertainment Weekly stated "Simon's always had a rueful streak, and this CD's spartan arrangements don't lend much cheer. But who's complaining? The singer's own "The Land of Christmas (Mary)" recalls classic Carly. And Willie Nelson's "Pretty Paper" is a beautifully understated duet. But occasional odd touches (an electric Dobro renders "O Come, All Ye Faithful" eerie) make it only Almost perfect."

== Release history ==
Simon re-released the album the following year with two bonus tracks: "White Christmas" (with Burt Bacharach) and "Forgive" (with Andreas Vollenweider). These two tracks were also released together as a CD single.

Borders released special limited copies in 2010 with the bonus track "The Night Before Christmas", from Simon's soundtrack album to the 1992 film This Is My Life. The previous year the song had been added to the MP3 version of the album.

== Track listings ==
=== Original 2002 release ===
Credits adapted from the album's liner notes.

No.	Title	Writer(s)	Length
1.	"Christmas Is Almost Here"	Livingston Taylor	4:00
2.	"O Come, All Ye Faithful"	Traditional	3:39
3.	"The Land of Christmas (Mary)"	Carly Simon	3:18
4.	"Silent Night"	Joseph Mohr; Franz Gruber	3:09
5.	"Twelve Gates to the City" (feat. Billy Preston)	Traditional	3:09
6.	"I'll Be Home for Christmas"	Kim Gannon; Walter Kent; Buck Ram; C. Simon^{[a]}	2:23
7.	"God Rest Ye Merry, Gentlemen"	Traditional	3:04
8.	"Heaven"	Lucy Simon; C. Simon	3:10
9.	"Pretty Paper" (duet with Willie Nelson)	Willie Nelson	3:29
10.	"Have Yourself a Merry Little Christmas"	Hugh Martin; Ralph Blane	3:07
11.	"Happy Xmas (War Is Over)"	John Lennon; Yoko Ono	4:12
Total length:			36:40

=== Expanded 2003 re-release ===
Credits adapted from the album's liner notes.

No.	Title	Writer(s)	Length
1.	"Christmas Is Almost Here"		4:00
2.	"White Christmas" (feat. Burt Bacharach)	Irving Berlin	2:45
3.	"O Come, All Ye Faithful"		3:39
4.	"The Land of Christmas (Mary)"		3:18
5.	"Silent Night"		3:09
6.	"Twelve Gates to the City" (feat. Billy Preston)		3:09
7.	"I'll Be Home for Christmas"		2:23
8.	"God Rest Ye Merry, Gentlemen"		3:04
9.	"Heaven"		3:10
10.	"Pretty Paper (duet with Willie Nelson)"		3:29
11.	"Have Yourself a Merry Little Christmas"		3:07
12.	"Happy Xmas (War Is Over)"		4:12
13.	"Forgive"	C. Simon; Andreas Vollenweider	1:23
Total length:			40:48

Borders 2010 limited edition
No.	Title	Writer(s)	Length
14.	"The Night Before Christmas (from the 1992 soundtrack album This Is My Life)"	C. Simon	3:41
Total length:			44:29

Notes

- ^a signifies a writer by additional lyrics

== Personnel ==
=== Musicians ===
- Carly Simon – vocals, acoustic guitar (4–6, 9, 12), arrangements (8)
- Deron Johnson – Roland JX-8P (1)
- Burt Bacharach – acoustic piano (2), vocals (2)
- Billy Preston – Hammond B3 organ (6), vocals (6)
- Benmont Tench – Wurlitzer electric piano (8, 12)
- Rob Mathes – acoustic piano (9)
- Adam MacDougal – acoustic piano (10)
- Dean Parks – acoustic guitar (1, 3, 7, 10)
- Mark Goldenberg – electric guitar (1, 6, 8), Rickenbacker 12-string guitar (11, 12)
- Joel Shearer – electric dobro (3), guitars (5, 12), acoustic guitar (8)
- Judd Fuller – acoustic guitar (10), mandolin (10)
- Willie Nelson – guitar (10), vocals (10)
- Chris Chaney – bass (1, 4, 5, 8–10, 12)
- Jim Keltner – drums (1, 4, 6, 8, 10, 12)
- Mickey Raphael – harmonica (10)
- Andreas Vollenweider – harp (13)
- Richie Sambora – arrangements (3)
- Arnold McCuller – harmony vocals (5, 8, 12)
- Ben Taylor – harmony vocals (5, 12), vocals (8)

=== Production ===
- Carly Simon – producer
- Don Was – producer, recording (1, 2, 4, 5, 7, 8, 10–13), engineer (1, 2, 4, 5, 7, 8, 10–13), mixing (1, 2, 4, 5, 8, 10–13)
- Ed Cherney – mixing (3, 6, 7), recording (6), engineer (6)
- Jimmy Parr – additional recording (5, 10, 12), recording (9), engineer (9), mixing (9), additional mixing (10)
- J.D. Andrew – assistant engineer
- Nick Brophy – digital editing
- Bob Ludwig – mastering at Gateway Mastering (Portland, Maine)
- Robin Hurley – A&R supervisor
- David McLees – A&R supervisor
- Blue Cullen – production coordinator
- Cindi Peters – production coordinator
- Denise Searle – production coordinator
- Jimmy Edwards – product manager
- Sheryl Farber – project assistant
- Gary Peterson – project assistant
- Tim Scanlin – project assistant
- Julie Vlasak – design
- Peter Simon – front cover photography, back cover photography, disc photography
- Max S. Gerber – inside booklet photography
- Arlyne Rothberg – management

== Charts ==
Chart (2002)	Peak position
US Top Holiday Albums (Billboard)	14
