= Tierra (band) =

American Latin R&B band

- Years active: 1972–present
- Past members: Rudy Salas; Steve Salas; Joey Guerra; Bobby Navarette; Bobby Loya; Steve Falomir; Andre Baeza; Phillip Madayag

Tierra is an American Latin R&B band from Los Angeles, California, founded in 1972 by former El Chicano members Rudy Salas (guitar) and his brother Steve Salas (vocals). The group became known for its blend of R&B, soul, rock, pop, and Latin influences and is regarded as one of the most successful bands to emerge from East Los Angeles.

Tierra achieved its commercial breakthrough with its third album, City Nights (1981), which featured the band's biggest hit, the 1980 remake of the Intruders' 1967 song "Together," written by Gamble & Huff. The single reached No. 18 on the Billboard Hot 100 and No. 9 on the Billboard R&B chart. In a November 1980 feature on the success of "Together," Billboard identified Tierra's lineup as Rudy Salas, Steve Salas, Joey Guerra, Bobby Navarrete, Andre Baeza, Steve Falomir, and Phillip Madayag. Credits for City Nights also include Bobby Loya among the album's musicians.

== Background ==
Tierra has the distinction of being the first Latino band to have four songs on the national chart, with two of them in the Top 100 at the same time.

In 1972, Rudy and Steve Salas formed Tierra and their self-titled debut album was recorded. By the mid-1970s the band consisted of the Salas brothers, Rudy Villa on reeds, Kenny Román on drums and Latin-percussion, Conrad Lozano on bass, Aaron Ballesteros on drums and vocals, Alfred Rubalcava on bass and Leon Bisquera on keyboards. Around that time they recorded the album Stranded for the Salsoul records label.

In 1980, they had a platinum hit with "Together", a remake of the 1967 song by the Intruders. The song, written by Gamble & Huff, reached No. 18 on the Billboard Hot 100, reached No.9 on Billboard's R&B chart, No. 23 on the US Cash Box Top 100 and No. 30 on the US Adult Contemporary chart. In 1981, they charted with "Memories" and "La-La Means I Love You", both entered the Billboard Top 100.

After the independent success of the single "Together," Tierra signed with Boardwalk Records and released City Nights, the band's third album. The album established Tierra as a national recording act and led to appearances on American Bandstand, Soul Train, Solid Gold, The Toni Tennille Show, and the American Music Awards, along with a national concert tour.

In 1981, in an interview with the Los Angeles Times Rudy Salas was quoted as saying "Sometimes I couldn't feed my family, I'm going out to get a legitimate job." At those bleak moments, his then wife Martha Salas would intervene. "She would talk me out of it," Salas said. "She knows how I love music. She would tell me, 'No way you're gonna quit, you'd just take it out on me and the kids and we'd all be miserable.' She was right".

In 1995, they released their A New Beginning album.

Around 1997, younger brother Steve supposedly quit the band after disputes over leadership of the band, money and management. In an interview he claimed that he was fired by his brother Rudy. He formed his own band and for a period of time there were two bands bearing the name Tierra. The Tierra band led by Steve Salas was booked for one night at the Conga Room. Rudy's second wife called the booking manager and asserted that the band led by her husband was the real Tierra. This led to the club's booking manager Robert Vargas getting into negotiations and mediating between the two brothers, Ultimately Mr Vargas recognized both Steve and Rudy had equal rights to the name. He had a plan to have a band consisting of the two brothers and as many members as possible from their successful years in the early 1980s. An argument developed over the line up, and Steve Salas backed out two weeks before the concert was to take place. He then apologized, and in January 2002, they were booked to play the Conga Room.

=== Recent years ===
Their album On Solid Ground was released in 2013. They appeared on Kid Frost's 2001 CD, Still Up in This Shit!, performing a new version of the Notations' "I'm Still Here".

Band member Isaac Avila died at age 49 of a brain hemorrhage on August 30, 2009. Johnny "the Stick" Valenzuela died some time between 2010 and 2013. Bassist Steve Falomir died due to a stroke on January 21, 2012 in Los Angeles. Rudy Salas died from COVID-19 on December 29, 2020, at age 71. Steve Salas died on February 10, 2022, at age 69, after a two-year battle with myeloma, also contracting COVID-19 .

The Salas family has been embroiled in a legal battle for their inheritance rights to the band's trademark. The ownership of Tierra, the Tierra band, and its intellectual property rights have become the subject of litigation in the Los Angeles Superior Court (Case No. 21 STCV 25207). The lawsuit was initiated by the Salas family against Joanna Salas, Rudy's second wife at the time of his death.

==== Associated acts ====
Tierra Legacy, run by David Salas, son of Rudy Salas' and nephew of Steve Salas. Also includes Rudy and Steve's brother Richard; J.P. Hurtado and Jonathan Lacayo are the lead singers; with some original City Nights members, and former members of Tierra .

== Band members ==
=== 1973 lineup ===
- Rudy Salas - guitar, vocals
- Steve Salas - lead vocals
- Rudy Villa - saxophone, flute
- David Torres - keyboards, trumpet, flute
- Kenny Roman - drums
- Conrad Lozano - bass

=== 1981 lineup ===
- Rudy Salas - Guitar, vocals
- Steve Salas - Lead vocals, trombone, timbales
- Andre Baeza - congas, percussion
- Joey Guerra - keyboards, backing vocals
- Steve Falomir - bass
- Philip Madayag - drums
- Bobby Navarrete - saxophones, backing vocals
- Bobby Loya - trumpet

=== Other past members ===
- Isaac Campos Avila - lead vocals, guitar
- Mike Jimenez - lead vocals
- Billy Mondragon - lead vocals
- Tino Melendez - lead vocals
- Conrad Lozano - bass
- David Torres - keyboards
- Aaron Ballesteros - drums
- Johnny "the Stick" Valenzuela - percussion
- Danny Santillan - drums
- Leon Bisquera - keyboards
- Christopher Trujillo - drums
- Joey Navarro - keyboards, background vocals
- Dale Villavicencio - percussion

== Discography ==
Year	Title	Peak chart positions	Label
Year	Title	US	Label
1973	Tierra	-	20th Century Records
1975	Stranded	-	Salsoul Records
1980	City Nights	38	ASI Records; Boardwalk Records
1981	Together Again	-	Boardwalk Records
1982	Bad City Boys	-	Boardwalk Records
1989	A New Beginning	-	Fiesta Records
1993	Tonight	-	Thump Records
1995	Street Corner Gold	-	Thump Records
1997	Latin Legends Live	-	Thump Records
2000	Greatest Hits	-	Thump Records
2001	Two Worlds - Dos Mundos	-	Thump Records
2005	Welcome to Cafe East L.A.	-	Thump Records
2005	The Rare Collection	-	I.T.P. Records
2007	Greatest Love Songs	-	Thump Records
2008	On the Right Track	-	M & M Records
2013	On Solid Ground	-	M & M Records
2017	Ya Llego	-	Music Access Inc.
2021	Keep It Going	-	Thump Records
