= The Slide Area =

Studio album by Ry Cooder
- Released: 1982
- Studios: Ocean Way, Hollywood
- Genres: Blues rock, country rock, roots rock
- Length: 39:11
- Label: Warner Bros.
- Producer: Ry Cooder

Ry Cooder chronology
| Borderline (1980) | The Slide Area (1982) | Get Rhythm (1987) |

The Slide Area is the tenth studio album by Ry Cooder. It was released in 1982 and peaked at No. 105 on the Billboard 200.

== Reception ==
Professional ratings
Review scores
| Source | Rating |
|---|---|
| AllMusic | 3.5/5 stars |
| Robert Christgau | C+ |
| The Rolling Stone Album Guide | 2/5 stars |

Reviewing the album for AllMusic, Bob Gottlieb said:

Yes, it is a rhythm & blues, bordering at times on funk album, and rap is one direction R&B took, but... The two gems on this are the phenomenal treatments of both 'Blue Suede Shoes' and Bob Dylan's 'I Need a Woman'. Two songs as different in the original forms as pigs and gerbils are converted to R&B hit status. Both contain some memorable slide guitar work, but isn't that what we expect from this master of the guitar family. The album is very good but those two songs make it a gem.

== Track listing ==
Side A

1. "UFO Has Landed in the Ghetto" (Ry Cooder, Jim Keltner)
2. "I Need a Woman" (Bob Dylan)
3. "Gypsy Woman" (Curtis Mayfield)
4. "Blue Suede Shoes" (Carl Perkins)

Side B

1. "Mama, Don't Treat Your Daughter Mean" (Cooder)
2. "I'm Drinking Again" (Cooder, Keltner)
3. "Which Came First" (Cooder, Willie Dixon)
4. "That's the Way Love Turned Out for Me" (Quinton Claunch, Cooder, Dave Hall)

== Personnel ==
Musicians

- Ry Cooder – guitar, vocals
- Jim Keltner – drums
- Jim Dickinson – keyboards (A1 – A3, B2, B4); piano (A4); electric piano (B1); organ (B3)
- William D. Smith – keyboards (A1 – A3, B2, B4)
- Tim Drummond – bass guitar (A1–A2, A4, B1, B3)
- Reggie McBride – bass guitar (B2, B4)
- Chuck Rainey – bass guitar (A3)
- Ras Baboo Pierre – percussion (A3)
- Bobby King – backing vocals (A1 – B1, B3, B4)
- Willie Greene – background vocals (A1 – B1, B3, B4)
- Herman Johnson – backing vocals (A1 – B1, B3, B4)
- John Hiatt – backing vocals (A1 – B1, B3, B4); guitar (B4)
- George McFadden – backing vocals (A4, B1)
- Kazu Matsui – Shakuhachi flute (B1, B3)

Technical

- Mark Ettel – engineer assistant
- Mark Linett – engineer (Santa Monica) (A1, A2, A4, B1, B3)
- Bernie Grundman – mastering
- Allen Sides – mixing (A3, B2, B4)
- Masuru Mera – cover photography
- Ry Cooder – producer
- Leslie Morris – assistant producer
