= Ersi Arvizu =

American singer and composer (born 1948)

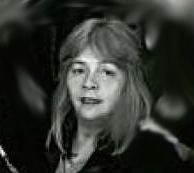
Portrait of Ersi Arvizu

Ersi Arvizu (born September, 1948) is an American singer and composer who was famous in the 1960s as part of The Sisters, the first girl-group singing and recording Chicano rock music. Until 1970 she was the lead singer of El Chicano. She is notable for her contribution to Chicano music. After a break from singing while she trained boxers and was a lightweight professional fighter herself, she was rediscovered by Ry Cooder. She lent her voice to his hit album Chávez Ravine. Her first solo album was then produced by him as her singing career resumed.

== Life and career ==
Arvizu's mother, Rita, was a singer-songwriter and guitarist. Her father Arturo Arvizu was also a singer and guitarist, as well as being a boxing trainer and manager. The two of them, Rita and Arturo, performed as ‘Dueto Arvizu’ at weddings and concerts. Ersi Arvizu was born in East Los Angeles, the youngest of six children. Her mother taught her to play guitar at 5 years old and she sang her first song at the age of six. Each of the siblings was taught how to sing, for an hour separately, while their mother was making dinner. With her sisters Mary and Rosella, Ersi performed at family parties singing in Spanish. Arturo had a backyard boxing gym and trained and managed boxers. He was thus able to arrange for the three girls to perform as ‘The Sisters’ at gigs held at boxing matches in venues such as the Olympic Auditorium in LA.

The three girls performed as The Sisters from 1963 to 1968 and were the first all-girl Chicano rock group performing and recording. They recorded 3 popular singles for Bob Keane's Del-Fi Records while still in their teens. They had hits with 'Gee Baby Gee', and 'Ooh Poo Pah Doo'. This local success led to their being booked as an opening act for artists such as Stevie Wonder, Ike and Tina Turner, and the duo who became Sonny and Cher. After The Sisters stopped performing, Rosella went on to become a world class Ranchera singer. Ersi Arturo went on to sing and perform with local groups such as ‘The Village Callers’ and ‘The VIP's’, who later became ‘El Chicano’, an East LA Latin rock band. El Chicano invited her to contribute two songs for their second album Revolución. One of them, "Sabor a Mi," sold a million records, is still known in Latino neighborhoods, and is considered a classic of the Eastside Sound.

After leaving El Chicano, Arturo worked with her father as a boxing trainer of boys aged 6 to 13, including Oscar De La Hoya. She was active later in the ring herself in, for example, Reno and Las Vegas, and had a 4–0 bout record. When Arvizu left boxing and training, she worked, among other things, as a FedEx driver, and rested her voice for some five years. She was considering returning to music, rehearsing with El Chicano again, when Ry Cooder, having heard her voice on a disc by The Sisters, sought her out for an audition for his current musical project. As a result, both Rosella and Ersi sang on his acclaimed 2005 album Chávez Ravine. Ersi sang the lead vocal on "Muy Fifi," and lead vocal and duet choruses with Little Willie G on ‘Soy Luz y Sombra’. The album was nominated for a Grammy in 2006.

In 2005, Ersi and Rosella reunited with sister Mary and formed 'La Chicana and her Revue', a show featuring the sisters singing some of their 1960s songs.

In 2008, Arvizu brought out her first solo album Friend for Life produced by Ry Cooder. In the same year, Arvizu was booked by Linda Ronstadt, the artistic director, to appear at the annual San José Mariachi Festival alongside Ry Cooder.

In December 2016, Arvizu performed at the celebration of the 100th Anniversary of Lalo Guerrero who was born on December 24, 1916.

In January, 2024, 'Ersi and friends' was the title of a panel discussion and concert at UCLA.

== Quotations ==
"That's the voice. And it's the best thing going. I can't tell you how rare it is," says Ry Cooder.
