= My Name Is Buddy =

Studio album by Ry Cooder
- Released: March 6, 2007
- Studios: Sound City Studios (Van Nuys, CA); Orange Stella Studio (Santa Monica, CA); Beacon, New York; Chateau Martín (Los Angeles, CA)
- Genres: Americana, folk, country, country folk, bluegrass, blues, honky tonk
- Length: 1:10:42
- Label: Nonesuch
- Producer: Ry Cooder

Ry Cooder chronology
Chávez Ravine (2005)	My Name Is Buddy (2007)	I, Flathead (2008)

My Name Is Buddy: Another Record by Ry Cooder is the thirteenth studio album by American musician Ry Cooder. It was released on March 6, 2007, via Nonesuch Records, serving as the second social-political concept album in a trilogy that began with Chávez Ravine and concluded with I, Flathead.

At the 50th Annual Grammy Awards, the album was nominated for Grammy Award for Best Contemporary Folk Album, but lost to Steve Earle's Washington Square Serenade.

== Background ==
Recording sessions took place at Sound City Studios in Van Nuys, Orange Stella Studio in Santa Monica, Beacon, New York and Chateau Martín in Los Angeles. Production was handled by Ry Cooder assisted by Aisha Ayers.

The album is packaged in a small booklet that includes a brief story and drawing to accompany each song. Both the songs and the stories relate tales from the viewpoint of the characters, Buddy Red Cat, Lefty Mouse, and Reverend Tom Toad. The liner notes ask listeners/readers to join them as they "journey through time and space in days of labor, big bosses, farm failures, strikes, company cops, sundown towns, hobos, and trains... the America of yesteryear".

The album become a cover feature in Sing Out! magazine.

== Critical reception ==
Professional ratings
Aggregate scores
Source	Rating
Metacritic	76/100
Review scores
Source	Rating
AllMusic	4/5 stars
Entertainment Weekly	C+
The Guardian	4/5 stars
Los Angeles Times	3.5/4 stars
MSN Music	(3-star Honorable Mention)
Now	2/5 Ns
The Observer	5/5 stars
PopMatters	9/10
Rolling Stone	3/5 stars
Uncut	4/5 stars

My Name Is Buddy was met with generally favorable reviews from music critics. At Metacritic, which assigns a normalized rating out of 100 to reviews from mainstream publications, the album received an average score of 76, based on sixteen reviews.

Tim Adams of The Observer praised the album, calling it "a light-hearted, sometimes poignant elegy for the American working man and his music". Michael Keefe of PopMatters declared: "as great as Chávez Ravine was, My Name Is Buddy is more thoroughly successful, possessing a stronger musical identity and top-notch songwriting throughout". Steve Hochman of Los Angeles Times stated: "although serious themes are threaded throughout, it's light compared with Cooder's last work, the Chávez Ravine account of cultural displacement, politics and baseball. Maybe for that very reason, this is a better listen". Robin Denselow of The Guardian noted: "the concept may be laboured, but the music is entertaining". John Lewis of Uncut wrote: "it's frequently wistful, sad and nostalgic. Yet Cooder's eccentric storytelling style and his prankish, Sufjan Stevens-ish take on Americana also sounds oddly contemporary".

In mixed reviews, Evan Schlansky of Rolling Stone stated that "musically, Cooder employs the pitch-perfect instrumentation that he's famous for". Jody Rosen of Entertainment Weekly stated: "Cooder's guitar work is lyrical as always, but the songs... are oppressively cutesy and faux naïve". Tim Perlich of Now wrote: "whether anyone outside of the NPR listening audience actually gives a shit about what clever socio-political points Cooder is trying to make metaphorically is difficult to say".

== Track listing ==
No.	Title	Writer(s)	Length
1.	"Suitcase in My Hand"	Ryland Peter Cooder	2:54
2.	"Cat and Mouse"	R. Cooder	5:02
3.	"Strike!"	R. Cooder	5:07
4.	"J. Edgar"	R. Cooder	2:37
5.	"Footprints in the Snow"	Traditional, with additional lyrics by Ry Cooder	3:07
6.	"Sundown Town"	R. Cooder; Joachim Cooder	2:57
7.	"Green Dog"	R. Cooder	7:33
8.	"The Dying Truck Driver"	R. Cooder	4:56
9.	"Christmas in Southgate"	R. Cooder	3:27
10.	"Hank Williams"	R. Cooder	4:09
11.	"Red Cat Till I Die"	R. Cooder	3:08
12.	"Three Chords and the Truth"	R. Cooder; J. Cooder	5:02
13.	"My Name Is Buddy"	R. Cooder	3:12
14.	"One Cat, One Vote, One Beer"	R. Cooder; J. Cooder; Jared Smith	4:15
15.	"Cardboard Avenue"	R. Cooder	4:33
16.	"Farm Girl"	R. Cooder	3:54
17.	"There's a Bright Side Somewhere"	Traditional, with additional lyrics by Ry Cooder	4:49
Total length:			1:10:42

== Personnel ==
- Ryland "Ry" Cooder – vocals (tracks: 1–5, 7–17), guitar (tracks: 1–4, 6–8, 10–13, 16, 17), bajo sexto (tracks: 5, 9), bass (tracks: 6, 12, 13), keyboards & mandola (track 13), banjo (track 15), producer, package design
- Roland White – vocals (tracks: 1, 5, 8), mandolin (tracks: 5, 8, 9, 15, 16)
- Bobby King – vocals (track 6)
- Terry Evans – vocals (track 6)
- Juliette Commagere – vocals (tracks: 7, 16)
- Mike Seeger – banjo (tracks: 1, 4), fiddle (tracks: 1, 3, 5, 9, 11, 15–17), harmonica (tracks: 3, 8), Jew's harp (track 3)
- Joachim Cooder – drums (tracks: 1, 3, 5, 7, 9–11, 13), percussion (tracks: 14, 15), keyboards (track 14)
- Paddy Moloney – tin whistle (tracks: 1, 17), Uilleann pipes (track 1)
- Van Dyke Parks – piano (tracks: 2, 5, 9, 17)
- Pete Seeger – banjo (track 4)
- Leonardo Jiménez – accordion (tracks: 5, 9, 17)
- René Camacho – bass (tracks: 5, 9)
- Jim Keltner – drums (tracks: 6, 12, 15–17)
- Jacques-Laurent Terrasson – piano (track 7)
- Stefon Harris – vibraphone & marimba (track 7)
- Mike Elizondo – bass (tracks: 10, 15–17)
- Jon Hassell – trumpet (track 14)
- Aisha Ayers – assistant producer
- Don Smith – recording, mixing
- Martin Pradler – additional recording, mixing, mastering, package design
- Sunny Dave Levine – additional recording
- Vincent Valdez – illustrations
- Susan Titelman – photography

== Charts ==
Chart (2007)	Peak position
Austrian Albums (Ö3 Austria)	64
Belgian Albums (Ultratop Flanders)	44
Dutch Albums (Album Top 100)	25
German Albums (Offizielle Top 100)	72
Italian Albums (FIMI)	28
Norwegian Albums (VG-lista)	10
Scottish Albums (Official Charts)	37
Swedish Albums (Sverigetopplistan)	37
Swiss Albums (Schweizer Hitparade)	70
UK Albums (Official Charts)	41
UK Album Downloads (Official Charts)	29
US Billboard 200	168
