= The Intruders (band) =

American vocal group

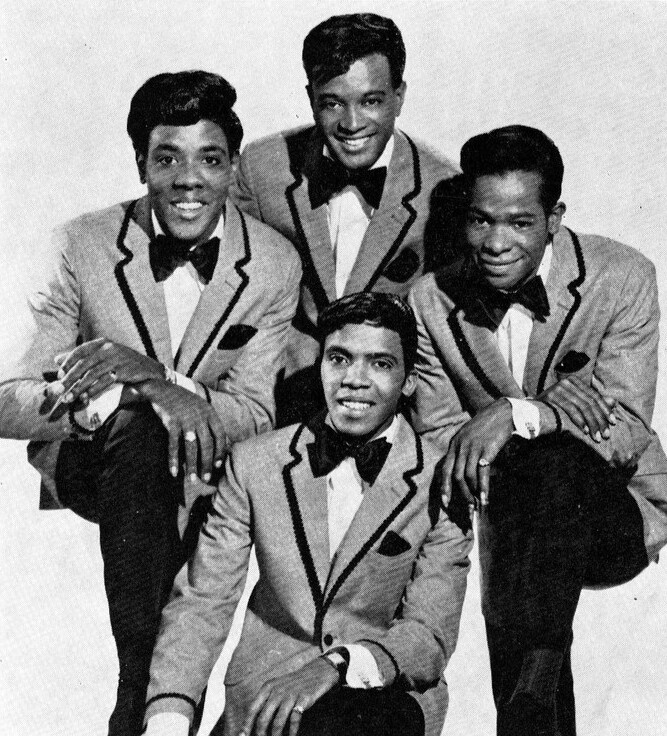
- The Intruders in 1968 (clockwise from bottom): Sam "Little Sonny" Brown, Phil Terry, Eugene "Bird" Daughtry, and Robert "Big Sonny" Edwards.

Background information
- Origin: Philadelphia, Pennsylvania, U.S.
- Genres: R&B, soul
- Years active: 1960–1985
- Labels: Excel; Gamble; TSOP; Streetwave, Moor Ent.
- Past members: Sam "Little Sonny" Brown; Phillip "Phil" Terry; Robert "Big Sonny" Edwards; Eugene "Bird" Daughtry; Robert "Bobby Starr" Ferguson

The Intruders were an American soul music vocal group most popular in the 1960s and 1970s. As one of the first groups to have hit songs under the direction of Kenny Gamble and Leon Huff, they were a major influence on the development of Philadelphia soul.

The Intruders had 24 R&B chart hits, including 6 R&B top tens, and 14 chart hits in the Billboard Hot 100, including their signature song, the million-selling top 10 hit, "Cowboys to Girls." Other notable songs include the top 10 R&B hits "(Love Is Like A) Baseball Game", "Together", "I'll Always Love My Mama", "United", and "I Wanna Know Your Name". The original members, all natives of Philadelphia, were Samuel "Little Sonny" Brown, Eugene "Bird" Daughtry, Phil Terry, and Robert "Big Sonny" Edwards.

== Biography ==
Formed in 1960, the group originally consisted of Sam "Little Sonny" Brown, Eugene "Bird" Daughtry, Phillip "Phil" Terry and Robert "Big Sonny" Edwards. In 1969, Sam Brown was replaced as lead singer by Bobby Starr, only to rejoin the group in 1973.

In 1965, when songwriters and record producers Kenny Gamble and Leon Huff first contemplated leaving the Cameo-Parkway record label to risk launching their own label, the vocalists on which they pinned all their hopes and venture capital were The Intruders. Like many other subsequent acts the duo produced, which included Harold Melvin and the Blue Notes and The O'Jays, The Intruders had already developed a vocal sound that was both theirs and uniquely Philadelphian.

Brown, Daughtry, Terry and Edwards had been recording and performing one-off singles together since 1961, blending Philly's street corner doo-wop tradition with black gospel fervor. The result was neither as pop-infected as Motown, nor as funky and blues-inflected as Stax. The sound which The Intruders refined for the Excel, Gamble and Philadelphia International imprints reflected a different attitude than either Stax or Motown.

Gamble and Huff's success with the Intruders helped convince Columbia Records to grant them the money to launch Philadelphia International. Gamble and Huff acknowledged that their work with the Intruders was the foundation of what they called "The Sound of Philadelphia".

The Intruders, meanwhile, were undergoing some internal turmoil. When the group resurfaced on the 1970 Gamble LP, When We Get Married, lead singer Brown was replaced by Bobby Starr. The title song, "When We Get Married" (R&B No. 8, Pop #45), a Dreamlovers cover, became a hit on the charts, as was the follow-up "Win, Place or Show (She's a Winner)" (UK #14). Starr's tenure with the group included Soul Train television appearances, and the rare collector's single, "I'm Girl Scoutin". Brown returned to the group in 1973 for the album Save the Children, which spawned the Intruders' last two big hits, "I Wanna Know Your Name" (R&B No. 9, Pop #60) and "I'll Always Love My Mama" (R&B No. 6, Pop #36). Kenny Gamble's mother Ruby, the inspiration for "I'll Always Love My Mama", died March 10, 2012, in Philadelphia, at the age of 96.

== Legacy ==
"Cowboys to Girls" (R&B No. 1, Pop #6), the only chart topping single of their career, was awarded an RIAA gold disc for one million sales in May 1968.

During the late 1970s and early 1980s, their music was popular on the West Coast among Latino, specifically Chicano, youth, as evidenced by their covers by the Hacienda Brothers and Tierra. Daughtry died of cancer on December 25, 1994, at age 55, and lead singer Sam "Little Sonny" Brown committed suicide April 21, 1995 at age 54. According to Marc Taylor, in the book, A Touch of Classic Soul, in 1975, the other two original Intruders, Robert Edwards and Phil Terry, walked away from the industry after becoming Jehovah's Witnesses. Edwards died on October 15, 2016, from a heart attack at age 74, leaving Phil Terry as the last surviving original member.

== Discography ==
=== Studio albums ===
Year	Album	Peak chart positions		Record label
Year	Album	US	US R&B	Record label
1967	The Intruders Are Together	—	23	Gamble
1968	Cowboys to Girls	112	11	Gamble
1970	When We Get Married	—	48	Gamble
1973	Save the Children	133	12	Gamble
1974	Energy of Love	—	41	TSOP
1985	Who Do You Love?	—	—	Streetwave
2002	How Long Has It Been	—	—	Moor Ent.
"—" denotes a recording that did not chart or was not released in that territory.

=== Compilation albums ===
Year	Album	Peak chart positions		Record label
Year	Album	US	US R&B	Record label
1969	Greatest Hits	144	19	Gamble
1973	Super Hits	—	51	Gamble
1994	Philly Golden Classics	—	—	Collectables
1995	Cowboys to Girls: The Best of the Intruders	—	—	Epic/Legacy
1998	On the Move	—	—	Sony Music
2002	Super Hits	—	—	Sony Music
"—" denotes a recording that did not chart or was not released in that territory.

=== Singles ===
Year	Single	Peak chart positions			Certifications
Year	Single	US	US R&B	UK	Certifications
1961	"Come Home Soon" (A-side) (Gowen label)	—	—	—	
1961	"I'm Sold (On You)" (B-side) (Gowen label)	—	—	—	
1962	"This Is My Song"	—	—	—	
1966	"Gonna Be Strong"	—	—	—	
1966	"(We'll Be) United"	78	14	—	
1966	"Devil with an Angel's Smile"	—	29	—	
1967	"(You Better) Check Yourself"	—	—	—	
1967	"Together"	48	9	—	
1967	"Baby I'm Lonely" (A-side)	70	28	—	
1967	"A Love That's Real" (B-side)	82	35	—	
1968	"Cowboys to Girls"	6	1	—	RIAA: Gold
1968	"(Love Is Like A) Baseball Game"	26	4	—	
1968	"Slow Drag"	54	12	—	
1969	"Give Her a Transplant"	104	23	—	
1969	"Me Tarzan You Jane"	—	41	—	
1969	"Lollipop (I Like You)"	101	22	—	
1969	"Sad Girl"	47	14	—	
1969	"Old Love"	—	35	—	
1970	"Tender (Was the Love We Knew)"	119	25	—	
1970	"When We Get Married"	45	8	—	
1970	"This Is My Love Song"	85	22	—	
1971	"I'm Girl Scoutin'"	88	16	—	
1971	"Pray for Me"	105	25	—	
1971	"I Bet He Don't Love You (Like I Love You)"	92	20	—	
1972	"(Win, Place or Show) She's a Winner"	—	12	14	
1973	"I'll Always Love My Mama (Part 1)"	36	6	32	
1973	"I Wanna Know Your Name"	60	9	—	
1974	"A Nice Girl Like You"	—	21	—	
1975	"Rainy Days and Mondays"	—	81	—	
1975	"Plain Ol' Fashioned Girl"	—	—	—	
1984	"Who Do You Love?"	—	—	65	
1985	"Warm and Tender Love"	—	—	99	
"—" denotes a recording that did not chart or was not released in that territory.

== Bibliography ==
- Jackson, John A. (2004). A House on Fire: The Rise and Fall of Philadelphia Soul. New York Oxford University Press. ISBN 0-19-514972-6.
- Pruter, Robert (1991). Chicago Soul. Urbana, IL: University of Illinois Press. ISBN 0-252-06259-0.
- Bogdanov, Vladimir (2003). All Music Guide to Soul: The Definitive Guide to R&B and Soul (illustrated ed.). Backbeat Books. ISBN 9780879307448.
