= Southern Comfort (disambiguation) =

Southern Comfort is a brand of liqueur.

Southern Comfort may also refer to:

== Music ==
- Matthews Southern Comfort, a band headed by Iain Matthews formed in 1969
- "Southern Comfort", a 1990 song by Suzi Quatro from Oh, Suzi Q.

=== Albums ===
- Southern Comfort (Anthony Hamilton album), 2007
- Southern Comfort (Conway Twitty album) or the title song, 1982
- Southern Comfort (The Crusaders album) or the title song, 1974
- Southern Comfort (Frank Wess album) or the title song, 1962
- Southern Comfort, by Psychic TV
- The Southern Comfort, by Emil Bulls, or the title song, 2005

== Other uses ==
- Southern Comfort Conference, an annual conference for people affected by transgender issues, formed in 1991
- Southern Comfort (1981 film), an American film by Walter Hill
- Southern Comfort (2001 film), a documentary film that takes its name from the annual conference
- "Southern Comforts", a 1991 episode of the television series Quantum Leap
- Southern Comfort: The Garden District of New Orleans, 1800-1900, a 1989 non-fiction book.
