= Rudy Regalado (musician) =

Venezuelan musician (1943–2010)

Background information
- Born: January 29, 1943; Caracas, Venezuela
- Died: November 4, 2010 (aged 67) Las Vegas, Nevada
- Genres: Latin, rock, Latin Jazz, Cuban music, Puerto Rican music, Music of Venezuela
- Instruments: Timbales, drums
- Years active: 1960–2010

Héctor José Regalado (January 29, 1943 – November 4, 2010) was a Venezuelan Latin music bandleader, percussionist, composer and educator. He played professionally under the name Rudy Regalado.

== Profile ==
Although he toured extensively in a career spanning more than 50 years, Rudy Regalado is better known for being one of the key members of El Chicano's percussion section, a popular Los Angeles-based group that surfaced during the Santana and Malo Latin-tinged rock era in the early 1970s. Besides this, Regalado led his own groups including the stage band Chévere and performed on countless recording sessions with distinguished artists. In addition to recording five albums with El Chicano, he also collaborated in projects led by Alex Acuña, Quincy Jones, Alphonse Mouzon, Bill Summers and Joe Zawinul, among others.

== Early life ==
Regalado was born and raised in a working-class family in Caracas, the capital city of Venezuela. Largely self-taught, he started to play drums and timbales as a teenager in his home town. A devoted baseball fan, he adopted his nickname after former Cleveland Indians infielder Rudy Regalado.

== Professional career ==
In 1963, Regalado moved to Puerto Rico and started playing in hotels and clubs in the San Juan area, while studying harmony and percussion at Pablo Casals Conservatory of Music. He settled in Los Angeles, California in 1970, where he played with local jazz and Latin groups before joining El Chicano late in the year.

Regalado spent twelve years with El Chicano, singing and playing the timbales in five albums, which included Top 40 hits during the 1970s with the songs "Viva Tirado" and "Tell Her She's Lovely". El Chicano also created the theme song for the television series Baretta, which ran on ABC from 1975 to 1978.

After spending 12 years with El Chicano, Regalado formed his own Latin Jazz All-Star Band in 1983, which included a select group of musicians from Los Angeles. Initially known as Todos Estrellas, the band eventually became known as Chévere and appeared at the Playboy Jazz Festival, Disneyland and Fiesta Broadway, among other engagements. The band also performed overseas in summer festivals in Canada, Hong Kong, Indonesia, Kuala Lumpur, Malaysia, Singapore, Thailand, and throughout the European continent.

As part of an El Chicano reunion in 2009, Regalado performed during the 40th anniversary of Woodstock Festival at the Golden Gate Park Music Concourse in San Francisco, where the group actually celebrated their own 40th Anniversary, and last played with them at the Greek Theatre in Los Angeles.

== Other credits ==
Regalado also toured with Aretha Franklin in charge of her percussion section, was a drummer for Los Melódicos on its 1980 tour of United States, and performed on The Tonight Show, the Nancy Wilson Show and American Bandstand.

His film credits include The Skeleton Key (2005), as well in the television series Pepe Plata (1990) and Clubhouse (2004).

Regalado moved later to Las Vegas, Nevada, where he died from complications of pneumonia at the age of 67.

== Selected discography ==
Year	Album	Artist	Credit
1972	Celebration	El Chicano	Percussion, drums
1973	Chicano	El Chicano	Percussion, drums
1974	Cinco	El Chicano	Percussion, drums
1974	Yaqui	Yaqui	Drums
1975	Pyramid of Love & Friends	El Chicano	Percussion, drums
1976	Viva El Chicano! Their Very Best	El Chicano	Vocals, timbales, percussion
1977	Blue Note Live at the Roxy	Alphonse Mouzon (Various Artists)	Timbales, percussion
1977	Roots	Quincy Jones	Percussion
1988	Immigrants	Joe Zawinul	Vocals, percussion
1990	Thinking of You	Alex Acuña and the Unknowns	Percussion
1992	Iroko	Bill Summers	Composer
1993	Moliendo Café	Rie Akagi and Rudy Regalado with Chévere	Timbales, percussion
1994	La Gloria	Rudy Regalado y Chévere	Producer, drums, vocals, timbales
1996	My People	Joe Zawinul	Percussion, composer
1998	Painting the Moment	El Chicano	Percussion, timbales
1999	Suckers	Original Soundtrack	Percussion
2000	Late Night Sessions	Caravana Cubana	Catá, timbales
2000	Acuarela de Tambores	Alex Acuña	Maracas, chekeré
2002	Faces & Places	Joe Zawinul	Percussion
2002	Cinco de Mayo Celebration	Various Artists	Timbales, percussion
2002	Del Alma	Caravana Cubana	Timbales, catá
2004	20th Century Masters - Millennium Collection	El Chicano	Timbales, percussion

== Selected videos at YouTube.com ==
- El Chicano - Viva Tirado (Live, 1971) on YouTube
- El Chicano - Mas Zacate (Live, HD, 16:9) on YouTube
- Rudy Regalado with Tito Puente in Telemundo on YouTube
- Rudy Regalado & Chevere in Good Day LA on YouTube
