= Save the Children (The Intruders album) =

Studio album by the Intruders
- Released: 1973
- Genre: Soul, Philly soul
- Label: Gamble
- Producer: Gamble & Huff

The Intruders chronology
When We Get Married (1970)	Save the Children (1973)	Energy of Love (1974)

Singles from Save the Children
- 1. "I'll Always Love My Mama" Released: March 7, 1973; 2. "I Wanna Know Your Name" Released: September 13, 1973; 3. "To Be Happy Is the Real Thing" Released: 1974

Save the Children is an album by the American soul group the Intruders, released in 1973.

The album peaked at No. 133 on the Billboard Top LPs & Tape chart.

== Production ==
Save the Children was produced by Gamble & Huff. It was the first album to credit the Philadelphia International Records house band, MFSB. "I'll Always Love My Mama", like many Intruders' songs, includes a mid-song interruption where the group members engage in a loose rap related to the song's theme. "Mother and Child Reunion" is a cover of the Paul Simon song.

== Critical reception ==
Professional ratings
Review scores
Source	Rating
AllMusic	3/5 stars
The Encyclopedia of Popular Music	4/5 stars
Pitchfork	8.2/10
The Rolling Stone Album Guide	4/5 stars

AllMusic stated that "the cream is the spirited, tear-inducing 'I'll Always Love My Mama', the best mama song ever." Pitchfork deemed the album "a deeply eccentric take on Philly soul." The Rolling Stone Album Guide wrote that the album "qualifies as one of the few consistently satisfying albums to come from the Philly factory," arguing that "disco begins here: the fleet guitar-and-horn stroke that ignites 'Mama' points the way to a new, non-rock dance groove."

== Track listing ==
No.	Title	Length
1.	"Save the Children"	6:58
2.	"Mother and Child Reunion"	4:04
3.	"I Wanna Know Your Name"	5:49
4.	"To Be Happy Is the Real Thing"	3:28
5.	"I'll Always Love My Mama"	6:36
6.	"Memories Are Here to Stay"	3:15
7.	"Teardrops"	5:07
8.	"Hang On in There"	3:21
