= Jim Keltner =

American drummer (born 1942)

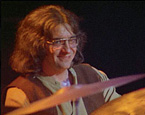
- Keltner performing at The Concert for Bangladesh in 1971

Background information
- Born: James Lee Keltner; April 27, 1942 (age 84); Tulsa, Oklahoma, U.S.
- Genres: Rock; R&B; jazz
- Occupation: Musician
- Instruments: Drums; percussion
- Years active: 1965–present
- Formerly of: Traveling Wilburys; Little Village; Delaney & Bonnie; Ringo Starr and his All Starr Band; Gary Lewis & the Playboys

James Lee Keltner (born April 27, 1942) is an American drummer and percussionist known primarily for his session work. He was characterized by Bob Dylan biographer Howard Sounes as "the leading session drummer in America".

== Career ==
Keltner was inspired to start playing because of an interest in jazz, but the popularity of jazz was declining during the late 1950s and early 1960s, and it was the explosion of pop/rock in the mid-1960s that enabled him to break into recording work in Los Angeles. His first gig as a session musician was recording "She's Just My Style" for the pop group Gary Lewis and the Playboys.

Keltner's music career was hardly paying a living, and for several years at the outset he was supported by his wife. Toward the end of the 1960s, he finally began getting regular session work and eventually became one of the busiest drummers in Los Angeles. His earliest credited performances on record were with guitarist Gabor Szabo on the 1968 album Bacchanal.

In 1968, Keltner was also working in a music shop in Pasadena just down the street from the old Ice House coffeehouse when he was recruited to play drums in a psychedelic vocal group named MC Squared along with Michael Crowley, Michael Clough, Linda Carey—all from the folk group The Back Porch Majority—and session guitarist/bassist Randy Cierley Sterling. They were signed by Mo Ostin and recorded an album for Warner/Reprise originally titled MC Squared which has later been re-mastered and re-released in 2012 with the album title Tantalizing Colors. They appeared live that same year on the Hugh Hefner / Playboy Magazine television show Playboy After Dark, playing two songs: an original by MC Squared members Michael Clough and Michael Crowley titled "I Know You" and a version of the Fred Neil song "Everybody's Talkin'". Both Playboy After Dark performances with Keltner playing drums can currently be viewed on YouTube.

It was his work with Leon Russell playing on Delaney & Bonnie's Accept No Substitute that attracted the attention of Joe Cocker, who recruited Russell and everyone else he could out of the Delaney & Bonnie band for his Mad Dogs & Englishmen tour. Playing with Joe Cocker led to work in 1970 and 1971, on records by Carly Simon (No Secrets), Barbra Streisand (Barbra Joan Streisand), Booker T. Jones (Booker T. & Priscilla), George Harrison (The Concert for Bangladesh) and John Lennon (Imagine).

=== Former Beatles ===
Keltner is known for his session work on solo recordings by three members of The Beatles, working with George Harrison, John Lennon (including Lennon solo albums, as well as albums released both by the Plastic Ono Band and Yoko Ono), and Ringo Starr.

Keltner played on many former Beatle solo releases, including Harrison's 1973 album Living in the Material World and Lennon's 1974 album Walls and Bridges. When Ringo Starr recorded his first full-fledged pop album, Ringo, Keltner was featured on five tracks. Following this, Keltner joined George Harrison on his 1974 tour of the United States.

In 1974, Keltner played on the Lennon-produced Harry Nilsson album Pussy Cats alongside Ringo (and Keith Moon) on "Rock Around the Clock". Keltner was featured on the Nilsson albums Nilsson Schmilsson as well as Duit on Mon Dei with Ringo Starr and Klaus Voormann.

Keltner's relationship with the former Beatles was such that, in 1973, his name was used to mock Paul McCartney on albums released by Harrison and Starr. Early that year, McCartney, the only Beatle not to have worked with Keltner, included a note on the back cover of his Red Rose Speedway album, encouraging fans to join the "Wings Fun Club" by sending a "stamped addressed envelope" to an address in London. Later that year, both Harrison's Living in the Material World and Starr's Ringo contained a similar note encouraging fans to join the "Jim Keltner Fan Club" by sending a "stamped undressed elephant" to an address in Hollywood. Keltner performed with George Harrison throughout his solo career. He even worked on Harrison's final posthumous album Brainwashed.

Keltner played the role of the judge in the music video for George Harrison's 1976 Top 30 hit, "This Song".

In 1989, Keltner toured with Ringo Starr & His All-Starr Band.

=== Equipment ===
Keltner is an endorser of DW drums, hardware and pedals, Ahead drumsticks/gloves/griptape, Paiste Cymbals, Remo drumheads and world percussion and Roland electronics.

=== Little Village ===
In 1987, Keltner, along with guitarist Ry Cooder and bassist Nick Lowe, played on John Hiatt's Bring the Family. Four years later the four musicians reunited as the band Little Village, recording an eponymous album.

=== Traveling Wilburys ===
Keltner played drums on both albums released by the 1980s supergroup the Traveling Wilburys, playing under the pseudonym "Buster Sidebury".

=== Ry Cooder ===
Keltner became Ry Cooder's go-to drummer, recording with him on many of his albums for over 40 years, including the following, as well as playing with him in Little Village.

- Boomer's Story (1972)
- Paradise and Lunch (1974)
- Chicken Skin Music (1976)
- Bop till You Drop (1979)
- Borderline (1980)
- The Slide Area (1982)
- Get Rhythm (1987)
- Chávez Ravine (2005)
- My Name Is Buddy (2007)
- I, Flathead (2008)
- Pull Up Some Dust and Sit Down (2011)

== List of artists ==
Keltner, as a freelance drummer, has worked with a long list of artists.

=== 1970s ===
Jim Keltner recorded two albums with his band Attitudes for George Harrison's Dark Horse label. The band also included Danny Kortchmar, David Foster and Paul Stallworth, and recorded Attitudes in 1975 and Good News in 1977.

He is featured on Carly Simon's 1971 album, Anticipation.

He played on various tracks on Randy Newman's albums Sail Away and Little Criminals, including "You Can Leave Your Hat On", "Short People", and "Jolly Coppers On Parade".

He also played drums on the Bee Gees 1973 album Life in a Tin Can.

He played on five songs on Jackson Browne's For Everyman album recorded in 1973 including the song "These Days."

In 1973, he was the session drummer on Bob Dylan's Pat Garrett & Billy the Kid, which includes the hit "Knockin' on Heaven's Door". He described that session as "a monumental session for me because it was such a touching song, it was the first time I actually cried when I was playing".

In 1974, he played on most tracks on the Jack Bruce album Out of the Storm.

Other demonstrations of his style and range can be found in "Jealous Guy" from John Lennon's Imagine, "Watching the River Flow" by Bob Dylan, and the hit single "Dream Weaver" by Gary Wright.

Keltner contributed to Joe Yamanaka's 1977 album To the New World.

Keltner is the drummer on the Steely Dan tune "Josie" (released in 1977). He played a Vistalite drum kit for the track, the only time he used it on a session. In the DVD Steely Dan - Classic Albums: Aja, Donald Fagen states that in the bridge of the tune, Keltner overdubbed a 16th note based pattern played on a metal trash can lid. Keltner clarified that it was a garbage can lid with special rivets worked into it that he had received as a Christmas gift.

Keltner appeared in the 1979 film Old Boyfriends playing drums as a 'Bloodshot Band' member.

Keltner is credited as the drummer on the 1979 album by Roy Clark and Gatemouth Brown, Makin' Music.

Keltner appears on Marc Jordan's 1979 album Blue Desert on the tracks "Twilight" and "Lost in The Hurrah".

=== 1980s ===
Keltner specialized in R&B, and developed a deceptively simple drumming style that melds a casual, loose feel with extraordinary precision. Jeff Porcaro has cited him as a major influence.

Keltner played on the Saved and Shot of Love albums by Bob Dylan.

Keltner performed on many classic recordings by J. J. Cale and often worked with bassist Tim Drummond.

He played on most of the tracks on Roy Orbison's swansong Mystery Girl.

He played on four Richard Thompson albums: Daring Adventures (1986), Amnesia (1988), Rumor and Sigh (1991) and you? me? us? (1996).

Keltner played drums on the song "Now We're Getting Somewhere" from the hit album Crowded House (1986).

Also, he was a session drummer for the reunited Pink Floyd on the album A Momentary Lapse of Reason.

=== 1990s ===
In the mid-1990s, Keltner joined the London Metropolitan Orchestra on its recording of "An American Symphony" on the movie soundtrack for Mr Holland's Opus.

In 1992, he played (together with Booker T. & the M.G.'s) at Bob Dylan's The 30th Anniversary Concert Celebration.

In 1993, he toured with Neil Young and Booker T. & the M.G.'s.

He played on Brian Wilson's 1995 album, I Just Wasn't Made for These Times.

He guested on Sheryl Crow's 1996 self-titled album, on the track "The Book".

He played on Gillian Welch's album Revival, on the track "The Only One and Only".

Keltner played on the 1997 Bill Frisell album Gone, Just Like a Train with Viktor Krauss and toured as a member of the trio in support of the album. He also played on the 1999 Frisell album Good Dog, Happy Man and is pictured in the CD leaflet and back cover (Nonesuch 79536-2).

In 1999, he played on Fiona Apple's album When the Pawn... on the track "I Know."

=== 2000s ===
In 2000, Keltner toured with Crosby, Stills, Nash & Young on their "Tour of America".

In 2000, he was the drummer on Neil Young's album Silver & Gold.

In 2000, Keltner collaborated with Charlie Watts, drummer of the Rolling Stones, on an instrumental album titled The Charlie Watts–Jim Keltner Project. Watts played drums for each track, while Keltner contributed sequenced sounds and percussion. Tracks were named after famous drummers.

In 2002, he briefly joined Bob Dylan's band during the European gigs while its main drummer, George Receli, recuperated from a hand injury. Later in the year, Keltner played in Concert For George, a tribute to George Harrison a year following his death. Wearing a sweatshirt with a Bob Dylan logo, he reprised his role as the Wilburys' drummer, joining Tom Petty and Jeff Lynne for "Handle with Care." During that project and performance, he worked with Paul McCartney along with other percussionists, including Ringo Starr.

In 2003, he toured with Simon & Garfunkel in their Old Friends tour.

In 2004, he was one of the "Hot Licks" on Dan Hicks' Selected Shorts CD.

In 2006, he toured with T-Bone Burnett in The True False Identity tour and was featured on Jerry Lee Lewis's album Last Man Standing. He played on Mavis Staples's album We'll Never Turn Back, produced by Ry Cooder.

He also lent his drumming skills to the tracks on Richard Shapero's album titled Wild Animus: The Ram, recorded the same year.

In 2007, he appeared with Lucinda Williams on West. The album was listed No. 18 on Rolling Stone's list of the Top 50 Albums of 2007. He also played on Phish keyboardist's self titled debut album Page McConnell, released in 2007.

In 2008, Keltner appeared on Break up the Concrete by The Pretenders, on One Kind Favor by B. B. King and on Oasis's "The Boy with the Blues", a non-album-track from Dig Out Your Soul.

Also in 2008, Keltner participated in the production of the album Psalngs, the debut release of Canadian musician John Lefebvre.

In 2009, Keltner played drums on singer/songwriter Todd Snider's Don Was-produced album, The Excitement Plan and on the Nonesuch debut, Christina Courtin.

=== 2010s ===
In 2010, Keltner produced Jerry Lee Lewis's Mean Old Man duets CD. He played drums on Fistful of Mercy's debut album, As I Call You Down, which one of the band's members, Dhani Harrison, described in an interview as the first project of his that he felt worthy to bring to Keltner, who was an old family friend (Dhani is the son of George Harrison). Keltner also played on The Union by Leon Russell and Elton John, produced by T-Bone Burnett and released on October 10, 2010. He also appeared on the eponymous Eric Clapton album, on 8 of the 14 tracks.

Joseph Arthur's 2011 album, The Graduation Ceremony, features Keltner on drums, reprising a partnership that began with the Fistful of Mercy project.

He has recorded twice with the indie band She & Him, on 2011's A Very She & Him Christmas and 2014's Classics.

He played drums on Michael Buble's 2011 Christmas album. The tracks are “All I Want for Christmas is You,” and “Blue Christmas.”

For the 2012 release, Chimes of Freedom: The Songs of Bob Dylan Honoring 50 Years of Amnesty International, Keltner sat in a studio with Outernational covering Dylan's "When the Ship Comes In".

In 2012, he also played drums on John Mayer's "Something Like Olivia", the fifth track of the album Born and Raised.

That same year, he recorded with Italian instrumental band Sacri Cuori on their second record, Rosario.

In 2013, Keltner appears on the track "If I Were Me" from Sound City: Real to Reel with Dave Grohl, Jessy Greene and Rami Jaffee. Also, on "Our Love Is Here To Stay", a classic Gershwin jazz standard recorded by Eric Clapton for his album, Old Sock.

In 2014, Keltner played on Peter Himmelman's album The Boat That Carries Us.

In 2016, Keltner recorded drums for Neil Young's thirty-seventh studio album, Peace Trail. In 2016, Keltner also appeared on the Rolling Stones' CD Blue & Lonesome, playing percussion on "Hoo Doo Blues."

In 2017, Keltner played drums and percussion as well as co-producing Conor Oberst's Salutations album. Oberst described Keltner's production as "flawless".

In 2018, he played drums and percussion on Boz Scaggs' 19th album, Out of the Blues, and Eric Clapton's Happy Xmas.

In 2019, he played drums and percussion Foxygen's most recent album, Seeing Other People.

In 2019, Keltner played drums along with bassist Mike Watt for guitarist Mike Baggetta's Wall of Flowers album released in March. Keltner played drums on the original soundtrack for the movie The Irishman. The music was written by Robbie Robertson.

=== 2020s ===
Keltner plays drums on the song "Kanashiki LA Tengoku" (悲しきLA天国) included on Mike Viola's 2020 album The Best of Mike Viola. Manga artist Naoki Urasawa, who wrote the original song, also performs on it and drew a short manga of the experience for his "Musica Nostra" series that features Keltner.

In 2024, Keltner joined Bob Dylan on the Outlaw Festival tour, sharing the stage with Willie Nelson and John Mellencamp. Following this he joined Dylan to complete his Rough and Rowdy Ways tour in Europe.

== Collaborations ==
Jim Keltner collaborations
Collaborator	Album	Label	Year
Ryan Adams	Gold	Lost Highway Records	2001
Karen Alexander	Voyager	Elektra Records	1978
Peter Allen	Taught by Experts	A&M Records	1976
Fiona Apple	When the Pawn...	Epic Records	1999
Fiona Apple	Extraordinary Machine	Epic Records	2005
Jann Arden	Time for Mercy	A&M Records	1993
Jann Arden	Happy?	A&M Records	1997
Joseph Arthur	Come to Where I'm From	Virgin Records	2000
Joseph Arthur	The Graduation Ceremony	Lonely Astronaut Records	2011
Joseph Arthur	The Ballad of Boogie Christ	Lonely Astronauct Records	2013
Murray Attaway	In Thrall	Geffen	1993
Hoyt Axton	Life Machine	A&M Records	1974
Hoyt Axton	Fearless	A&M Records	1976
Hoyt Axton	Free Sailin'	MCA Records	1978
Sara Bareilles	Amidst the Chaos	Epic Records	2019
Carole Bayer Sager	Carole Bayer Sager	Elektra Records	1977
Carole Bayer Sager	...Too	Elektra Records	1978
Carole Bayer Sager	Sometimes Late at Night	Boardwalk Records	1981
Jessie Baylin	Little Spark	Blonde Rat	2012
The Beach Boys	Still Cruisin'	Capitol Records	1989
Bee Gees	Life in a Tin Can	RSO Records	1973
Bob Bennett	Non-Fiction	Star Song	1985
Marc Benno	Minnows	A&M Records	1971
Marc Benno	Ambush	A&M Records	1972
Marc Benno	Lost in Austin	A&M Records	1979
Matraca Berg	The Speed of Grace	MCA Records	1994
Frank Black	Fast Man Raider Man	Cooking Vinyl	2006
Hanne Boel	Dark Passion	Medley Records	1990
Debby Boone	Surrender	Sparrow Records	1983
Delaney Bramlett	Sounds From Home	Zane	1998
Michelle Branch	Everything Comes and Goes	Reprise Records	2010
Phoebe Bridgers	Punisher	Dead Oceans	2020
Jackson Browne	For Everyman	Asylum Records	1973
Jackson Browne	Lives in the Balance	Asylum Records	1986
Jackson Browne	I'm Alive	Elektra Records	1993
Jackson Browne	Standing in the Breach	Inside Recordings	2014
Clarence "Gatemouth" Brown	Makin' Music	MCA Records	1978
Clarence "Gatemouth" Brown	Long Way Home	Verve Records	1995
Carla Bruni	French Touch	Barcklay Records	2017
Peabo Bryson and Roberta Flack	Born to Love	Capitol Records	1983
Michael Bublé	Christmas	Reprise Records	2011
Michael Bublé	To Be Loved	Reprise Records	2013
Michael Bublé	Higher	Reprise Records	2022
Lindsey Buckingham and Stevie Nicks	Buckingham Nicks	Polydor	1973
JJ Cale	Shades	Island Records	1981
JJ Cale	8	Mercury Records	1983
JJ Cale	Travel-Log	BMG	1990
JJ Cale	Closer to You	Virgin Records	1994
JJ Cale	Roll On	Rounder Records	2009
Irene Cara	Carasmatic	Elektra Records	1987
Kim Carnes	Kim Carnes	A&M Records	1975
Keith Carradine	Lost & Found	Asylum Records	1979
Carlene Carter	I Fell in Love	Reprise Records	1990
Carlene Carter	Carter Girl	Rounder Records	2014
David Cassidy	The Higher They Climb	RCA Records	1975
David Cassidy	Home Is Where the Heart Is	RCA Records	1976
Beth Nielsen Chapman	Sand and Water	Reprise Records	1997
Cher	Stars	Warner Bros. Records	1975
Toni Childs	House of Hope	A&M Records	1991
Eric Clapton	Journeyman	Reprise Records	1989
Eric Clapton	From the Cradle	Warner Bros. Records	1994
Eric Clapton	Me and Mr. Johnson	Reprise Records	2004
Eric Clapton	Clapton	Reprise Records	2010
Eric Clapton	Old Sock	Polydor Records	2013
Eric Clapton	Happy Xmas	Polydor Records	2018
Jimmy Cliff	Follow My Mind	Reprise Records	1975
Jimmy Cliff	Give Thankx	Warner Bros. Records	1978
Bruce Cockburn	Nothing but a Burning Light	True North Records	1991
Joe Cocker	Joe Cocker	A&M Records	1972
Joe Cocker	Civilized Man	Capitol Records	1984
Joe Cocker	Night Calls	Capitol Records	1991
Joe Cocker	Organic	550 Music	1996
Joe Cocker	Hymn for My Soul	EMI	2007
Adam Cohen	Adam Cohen	Columbia Records	1998
Leonard Cohen	Death of a Ladies' Man	Warner Bros. Records	1977
Marc Cohn	The Rainy Season	Atlantic Records	1993
Marc Cohn	Join the Parade	Decca Records	2007
Jude Cole	Start the Car	Reprise Records	1992
Judy Collins	Hard Times for Lovers	Elektra Records	1979
Shawn Colvin	Fat City	Columbia Records	1992
Shawn Colvin	Cover Girl	Columbia Records	1994
Ry Cooder	Boomer's Story	Reprise Records	1972
Ry Cooder	Paradise and Lunch	Reprise Records	1974
Ry Cooder	Chicken Skin Music	Reprise Records	1976
Ry Cooder	Bop till You Drop	Warner Bros. Records	1979
Ry Cooder	Borderline	Warner Bros. Records	1980
Ry Cooder	The Slide Area	Warner Bros. Records	1982
Ry Cooder	Get Rhythm	Warner Bros. Records	1987
Ry Cooder	Chávez Ravine	Nonesuch Records	2005
Ry Cooder	My Name Is Buddy	Nonesuch Records	2007
Ry Cooder	I, Flathead	Nonesuch Records	2008
Ry Cooder	Pull Up Some Dust and Sit Down	Nonesuch Records	2011
Priscilla Coolidge and Booker T. Jones	Booker T. & Priscilla	A&M Records	1971
Priscilla Coolidge and Booker T. Jones	Chronicles	A&M Records	1973
Rita Coolidge	Rita Coolidge	A&M Records	1971
Rita Coolidge	The Lady's Not for Sale	A&M Records	1972
Rita Coolidge	Satisfied	A&M Records	1979
Elvis Costello	King of America	F-Beat Records	1986
Elvis Costello	Spike	Warner Bros. Records	1989
Elvis Costello	Mighty Like a Rose	Warner Bros. Records	1991
Elvis Costello	Kojak Variety	Warner Bros. Records	1995
Elvis Costello	Painted from Memory	Mercury Records	1998
Christina Courtin	Christina Courtin	Nonesuch Records	2009
Cracker	Cracker	Virgin Records	1992
Marshall Crenshaw	Jaggedland	429 Records	2009
A. J. Croce	A. J. Croce	Private Music	1993
A. J. Croce	That's Me in the Bar	Private Music	1995
Crosby, Stills, Nash & Young	Looking Forward	Reprise Records	1999
David Crosby	Oh Yes I Can	A&M Records	1989
David Crosby	Thousand Roads	Atlantic Records	1993
Sheryl Crow	Sheryl Crow	A&M Records	1996
Crowded House	Crowded House	Capitol Records	1986
Rodney Crowell	Ain't Living Long Like This	Warner Bros. Records	1978
Patti Dahlstrom	Your Place or Mine	20th Century Records	1975
Ron Davies	Silent Song Through the Land	A&M Records	1970
Kiki Dee	Stay with Me	Rocket	1979
Diana DeGarmo	Blue Skies	RCA Records	2004
Lana Del Rey	Did You Know That There's a Tunnel Under Ocean Blvd	Polydor Records	2023
Delaney & Bonnie	The Original Delaney & Bonnie & Friends	Elektra Records	1969
Delaney & Bonnie	Motel Shot	Atco Records	1971
Michael Des Barres	Somebody Up There Likes Me	MCA Records	1986
Dion DiMucci	Born to Be with You	Phil Spector Records	1975
Céline Dion	Taking Chances	Columbia Records	2007
Craig Doerge	Craig Doerge	Columbia Records	1973
Denny Doherty	Waiting for a Song	Ember Records	1974
Donovan	Slow Down World	Epic Records	1976
Donovan	Beat Cafe	Appleeseed Records	2004
Les Dudek	Ghost Town Parade	Columbia Records	1978
Bob Dylan	Saved	Columbia Records	1980
Bob Dylan	Shot of Love	Columbia Records	1981
Bob Dylan	Empire Burlesque	Columbia Records	1985
Bob Dylan	Time Out of Mind	Columbia Records	1997
Tim Easton	Break Your Mother's Heart	New West Records	2003
Yvonne Elliman	Night Flight	RSO Records	1978
Yvonne Elliman	Yvonne	RSO Records	1979
Melissa Etheridge	Breakdown	Island Records	1999
Terry Evans	Blues for Thought	Point Blank Records	1994
Terry Evans	Puttin' In Down	AudioQuest Music	1995
Terry Evans	Walk That Walk	Telark Records	2000
Don Everly	Don Everly	Ode Records	1970
Eye to Eye	Eye to Eye	Warner Bros. Records	1982
Don Felder	American Rock 'n' Roll	BMG	2019
José Feliciano	And the Feeling's Good	RCA Victor	1974
José Feliciano	For My Love... Mother Music	RCA Victor	1974
Neil Finn	One Nil	Parlophone Records	2001
Firefall	Élan	Atlantic Records	1978
Roberta Flack	I'm the One	Atlantic Records	1982
Dan Fogelberg	Twin Sons of Different Mothers	Epic Records	1978
Richie Furay	Seasons of Change	Myrrh Records	1982
Ted Gärdestad	Blue Virgin Isles	Polar	1978
Melody Gardot	The Absence	Decca Records	2012
Art Garfunkel	Breakaway	Columbia Records	1975
Lowell George	Thanks, I'll Eat It Here	Warner Bros. Records	1979
William Lee Golden	American Vagabond	MCA Records	1986
Lesley Gore	Love Me By Name	A&M Records	1976
Marjoe Gortner	Bad, but Not Evil	Chelsea Records	1972
Henry Gross	Henry Gross	ABC Records	1972
Arlo Guthrie	Hobo's Lullaby	Reprise Records	1972
Arlo Guthrie	Last of the Brooklyn Cowboys	Reprise Records	1973
Arlo Guthrie	Arlo Guthrie	Reprise Records	1974
Emmylou Harris, Dolly Parton and Linda Ronstadt	Trio II	Asylum Records	1999
George Harrison	Living in the Material World	Apple Records	1973
George Harrison	Dark Horse	Apple Records	1974
George Harrison	Extra Texture (Read All About It)	Apple Records	1975
George Harrison	Somewhere in England	Dark Horse Records	1981
George Harrison	Gone Troppo	Dark Horse Records	1982
George Harrison	Cloud Nine	Dark Horse Records	1987
George Harrison	Brainwashed	Dark Horse Records	2002
Wings Hauser	Your Love Keeps Me Off the Streets	RCA Records	1975
Ted Hawkins	The Next Hundred Years	DGC	1994
Don Henley	Building the Perfect Beast	Geffen	1984
Don Henley	The End of the Innocence	Geffen	1989
Joe Henry	Tiny Voices	Anti-	2003
Susanna Hoffs	Susanna Hoffs	London Records	1996
Thelma Houston	I've Got the Music in Me	Sheffeld Lab	1975
John Lee Hooker	Mr. Lucky	Virgin Records	1991
Indigo Girls	Nomads Indians Saints	Epic Records	1990
Chris Isaak	Silvertone	Warner Bros. Records	1985
Chris Isaak	San Francisco Days	Reprise Records	1993
Mick Jagger	Wandering Spirit	Atlantic Records	1993
Mick Jagger	Goddess in the Doorway	Virgin Records	2001
Colin James	Limelight	MapleMusic Recordings	2005
Japanese Breakfast	For Melancholy Brunettes (& Sad Women)	Dead Oceans	2025
Elton John and Leon Russell	The Union	Mercury Records	2010
Tom Johnston	Everything You've Heard Is True	Warner Bros. Records	1979
Rickie Lee Jones	Flying Cowboys	Geffen	1989
Rickie Lee Jones	Traffic from Paradise	Geffen	1993
Tonio K.	Notes from the Lost Civilization	A&M Records	1988
Eric Kaz	Cul-De-Sac	Atlantic	1974
Barbara Keith	Barbara Keith	Reprise Records	1973
Albert King	Lovejoy	Stax Records	1971
B. B. King	B. B. King in London	ABC Records	1971
B. B. King	There Is Always One More Time	MCA Records	1991
B. B. King	Deuces Wild	MCA Records	1997
B. B. King	One Kind Favor	Geffen	2008
Freddie King	Woman Across the River	Shelter Records	1973
Gladys Knight	Miss Gladys Knight	Buddah Records	1978
Diana Krall	Wallflower	Verve Records	2015
Alison Krauss	Forget About It	Rounder Records	1999
Christine Lakeland	Reckoning	Virgin Records	1993
Claudia Lennear	Phew!	Warner Bros. Records	1973
John Lennon	Imagine	Apple Records	1971
John Lennon	Mind Games	Apple Records	1973
John Lennon	Walls and Bridges	Apple Records	1974
John Lennon	Rock 'n' Roll	Apple Records	1975
Jenny Lewis	On the Line	Warner Bros. Records	2019
Nick Lowe	Party of One	Reprise Records	1990
Lonnie Mack	Second Sight	Alligator Records	1986
Aimee Mann	Whatever	Geffen	1993
Melissa Manchester	Don't Cry Out Loud	Arista Records	1978
The Manhattan Transfer	Coming Out	Atlantic Records	1976
Ziggy Marley and the Melody Makers	Spirit of Music	Elektra Records	1999
Dave Mason	Alone Together	Blue Thumb Records	1970
Dave Mason	It's Like You Never Left	Blue Thumb Records	1973
John Mayer	Born and Raised	Columbia Records	2012
John Mayer	The Search for Everything	Columbia Records	2017
Delbert McClinton	One of the Fortunate Few	Rising Tide	1997
Maria McKee	Maria McKee	Geffen	1989
Maria McKee	You Gotta Sin to Get Saved	Geffen	1993
Pat McLaughlin	Pat McLaughlin	Capitol Records	1988
Shannon McNally	Jukebox Sparrows	Capitol Records	2002
Sérgio Mendes	País Tropical	A&M Records	1971
Bette Midler	Broken Blossom	Atlantic Records	1977
Bette Midler	No Frills	Atlantic Records	1983
Rhett Miller	The Instigator	Elektra Records	2002
Steve Miller Band	Recall the Beginning...A Journey from Eden	Capitol Records	1972
Joni Mitchell	Turbulent Indigo	Reprise Records	1994
Keb' Mo'	The Door	Epic Records	2000
Howdy Moon	Howdy Moon	A&M Records	1974
Gaby Moreno and Van Dyke Parks	¡Spangled!	Nonesuch Records	2019
Gaby Moreno	Alegoría	Metamorfosis	2022
Maria Muldaur	Maria Muldaur	Reprise Records	1973
Marcus Mumford	Self-Titled	Island Records	2022
Willie Nelson	Across the Borderline	Columbia Records	1993
Aaron Neville	Warm Your Heart	A&M Records	1991
Ivan Neville	If My Ancestors Could See Me Now	Polydor Records	1988
Randy Newman	Sail Away	Reprise Records	1972
Randy Newman	Good Old Boys	Reprise Records	1974
Randy Newman	Little Criminals	Reprise Records	1977
Randy Newman	Randy Newman's Faust	Reprise Records	1995
Harry Nilsson	Nilsson Schmilsson	RCA Victor	1971
Harry Nilsson	Pussy Cats	RCA Victor	1974
Harry Nilsson	Duit on Mon Dei	RCA Victor	1975
Harry Nilsson	Sandman	RCA Victor	1976
Harry Nilsson	...That's the Way It Is	RCA Victor	1976
Harry Nilsson	Flash Harry	Mercury Records	1980
Danny O'Keefe	The Global Blues	Warner Bros. Records	1979
Conor Oberst	Salutations	Nonesuch Records	2017
Nigel Olsson	Nigel Olsson	Rocket	1975
Yoko Ono	Fly	Apple Records	1971
Yoko Ono	Feeling the Space	Apple Records	1973
Roy Orbison	Mystery Girl	Virgin Records	1989
Roy Orbison	King of Hearts	Virgin Records	1992
Beth Orton	Daybreaker	Heavenly Records	2002
Tom Pacheco	The Outsider	RCA Victor	1976
Nerina Pallot	Fires	Idaho Records	2005
Van Dyke Parks	Clang of the Yankee Reaper	Warner Bros. Records	1976
Van Dyke Parks	Jump!	Warner Bros. Records	1984
Dolly Parton	Here You Come Again	RCA Records	1977
Dolly Parton	Great Balls of Fire	RCA Records	1979
Dolly Parton	Rainbow	Mercury Records	1987
Michael Penn	March	RCA Records	1989
Michael Penn	Free-for-All	RCA Records	1992
Perfume Genius	Set My Heart on Fire Immediately	Matador Records	2020
Perfume Genius	Glory	Matador Records	2025
Tom Petty	Full Moon Fever	MCA Records	1989
Tom Petty and the Heartbreakers	Damn the Torpedoes	MCA Records	1979
Tom Petty and the Heartbreakers	Southern Accents	MCA Records	1985
Sam Phillips	Omnipop (It's Only a Flesh Wound Lambchop)	Virgin Records	1996
Sam Phillips	Fan Dance	Nonesuch Records	2001
Sam Phillips	A Boot and a Shoe	Nonesuch Records	2004
Pink Floyd	A Momentary Lapse of Reason	Columbia Records	1987
Michel Polnareff	Michel Polnareff	Atlantic Records	1975
David Pomeranz	It's in Every One of Us	Arista Records	1975
Don Preston	Been Here All The Time	Shelter Records	1974
The Pretenders	Break Up the Concrete	Shangri-La Music	2008
Tristan Prettyman	Cedar + Gold	Capitol Records	2012
Joshua Radin	Underwater	Mom + Pop Music	2012
Bonnie Raitt	Takin' My Time	Warner Bros. Records	1973
Willis Alan Ramsey	Willis Alan Ramsey	Shelter Records	1972
Martha Reeves	Martha Reeves	MCA Records	1974
Dig Richards	Digby Richards	RCA Records	1975
Johnny Rivers	Home Grown	United Artists Records	1970
Johnny Rivers	Outside Help	Big Tree Records	1977
Johnny Rivers	Not a Through Street	CBS	1983
Robbie Robertson	How to Become Clairvoyant	429 Records	2011
Robbie Robertson	Sinematic	UME	2019
Janice Robinson	The Color Within Me	Columbia Records	1999
Smokey Robinson	Smokey & Friends	Verve Records	2014
The Rolling Stones	Bridges to Babylon	Virgin Records	1997
The Rolling Stones	Blue & Lonesome	Polydor Records	2016
Linda Ronstadt	Feels Like Home	Elektra Records	1995
Linda Ronstadt	We Ran	Elektra Records	1998
Leon Russell	Leon Russell and the Shelter People	Shelter Records	1971
Leon Russell	Carney	Shelter Records	1972
Leon Russell	Stop All That Jazz	Shelter Records	1974
Leon Russell	Will O' the Wisp	Shelter Records	1975
Boz Scaggs	Come On Home	Virgin Records	1997
Boz Scaggs	Out of the Blues	Concord Records	2018
Patti Scialfa	Rumble Doll	Columbia Records	1993
Seals and Crofts	Summer Breeze	Warner Bros. Records	1972
Seals and Crofts	Takin' It Easy	Warner Bros. Records	1978
Vonda Shepard	The Radical Light	Reprise Records	1992
Shivaree	I Oughtta Give You a Shot in the Head for Making Me Live in This Dump	Capitol Records	1999
Carly Simon	No Secrets	Elektra Records	1972
Carly Simon	Hotcakes	Elektra Records	1974
Carly Simon	Another Passenger	Elektra Records	1976
Carly Simon	Christmas Is Almost Here	Rhino Records	2002
Carly Simon	Christmas Is Almost Here Again	Rhino Records	2003
Jill Sobule	California Years	Pinko Records	2009
JD Souther	Black Rose	Asylum Records	1976
Splinter	The Place I Love	Dark Horse Records	1974
Splinter	Harder to Live	Dark Horse Records	1975
Mavis Staples	We'll Never Turn Back	Anti-	2007
Pops Staples	Peace to the Neighborhood	Pointblack Records	1992
Pops Staples	Father Father	Pointblack Records	1994
Ringo Starr	Ringo	Apple Records	1973
Ringo Starr	Goodnight Vienna	Apple Records	1974
Ringo Starr	Ringo's Rotogravure	Polydor Records	1976
Ringo Starr	Stop and Smell the Roses	RCA Records	1981
Steely Dan	Aja	ABC Records	1977
Rod Stewart	Vagabond Heart	Warner Bros. Records	1991
Curtis Stigers	Brighter Days	Columbia Records	1999
Chris Stills	100 Year Thing	Atlantic Records	1998
Syd Straw	Surprise	Virgin Records	1989
Barbra Streisand	Barbra Joan Streisand	Columbia Records	1971
Matthew Sweet	In Reverse	Volcano	1999
James Taylor	Gorilla	Warner Bros. Records	1975
James Taylor	In the Pocket	Warner Bros. Records	1976
Livingston Taylor	Three Way Mirror	Epic Records	1978
Rob Thomas	Cradlesong	Atlantic Records	2009
Rob Thomas	Someday	Atlantic Records	2010
Richard Thompson	Daring Adventures	Polydor Records	1986
Richard Thompson	Amnesia	Capitol Records	1988
Richard Thompson	Rumor and Sigh	Capitol Records	1991
Richard Thompson	You? Me? Us?	Capitol Records	1996
Tanita Tikaram	Lovers in the City	East West Records	1995
Cal Tjader	Cal Tjader Sounds Out Burt Bacharach	Skye Records	1968
Toto	Fahrenheit	Columbia Records	1986
Toto	The Seventh One	Columbia Records	1988
Toto	Kingdom of Desire	Relativity Records	1992
Valdy	Landscapes	Haida	1973
Valdy	See How the Years Have Gone By	A&M Records	1975
Frankie Valli	Closeup	Private Stock Records	1975
Rosie Vela	Zazu	A&M Records	1986
Loudon Wainwright III	Unrequited	Columbia Records	1975
Loudon Wainwright III	Here Come the Choppers	Sovereign Records	2005
Rufus Wainwright	Rufus Wainwright	DreamWorks Records	1998
Rufus Wainwright	Poses	DreamWorks Records	2001
Rufus Wainwright	Unfollow the Rules	BMG	2020
Wayne Watson	Field of Souls	Warner Alliance	1995
Larry Weiss	Black & Blue Suite	20th Century Records	1974
Gillian Welch	Revival	Almo Sounds	1996
Brian Wilson	I Just Wasn't Made for These Times	MCA Records	1995
Brian Wilson	No Pier Pressure	Capitol Records	2015
Bill Withers	Just as I Am	Sussex Records	1971
Lauren Wood	Lauren Wood	Capitol Records	1979
Ronnie Wood	Gimme Some Neck	Columbia Records	1979
Ronnie Wood	1234	Columbia Records	1981
Ronnie Wood	I Feel Like Playing	Eagle Rock Entertainment	2010
Bill Wyman	Stone Alone	Atlantic Records	1976
Neil Young	Silver & Gold	Reprise Records	2000
Neil Young	Peace Trail	Reprise Records	2016
Warren Zevon	Mr. Bad Example	Giant	1991
Warren Zevon	The Wind	Artemis Records	2003
