= Rudy Salas (musician) =

American chicano rock musician (1949–2020)

- Born: January 5, 1949; Lincoln Heights, Los Angeles
- Died: December 29, 2020 (aged 71)
- Genres: Latin rock, r&b
- Occupation: Musician
- Instruments: Guitar, vocals
- Years active: 1960s - 2000s
- Formerly of: The Salas Brothers, One G Plus Three, El Chicano, Tierra

Rudy Salas (5 January 1949 – 29 December 2020) was a musician who was a member of the group El Chicano. He was also the co-founder of the L.A. Latin R&B band, Tierra. Along with his brother Steve, he was a major part of the Eastside sound from the mid-1960s.

== History ==
Rudy was raised in Lincoln Heights. In the early days he did not speak Spanish. He and his brother picked up the harmonies from his mother and uncle who would sing at family gatherings. Taking what he learned from his mother, he and his brother started playing neighborhood fiestas. In the early to mid 1960s, the brothers were spotted by Mario Paniagua a leader of The Percussions, Jaguars. When Rudy was about age 11, he appeared on "Where Lovers Go" by the Jaguars. Not long after that, Rudy and Steve recorded singles for Eddie Davis's Faro label as The Salas Brothers.

Later Salas joined groups such as El Chicano and Maya. In 1972, Rudy and Steve joined El Chicano with Rudy as a guitarist. In 1973, Rudy and his brother formed Tierra, and their first album Tierra was recorded. In 1980, as an Eastside group, the brothers with their group had unmatched success with their cover of the Intruders hit "Together". He produced their 1980 album City Nights that featured the hit. Following a falling out with his brother, they did not work together for 11 years.

In 2010 Salas played a concert at the Inland Empire with former El Chicano bandmate Bobby Espinosa who would soon pass away.

Salas died on 29 December 2020, at age 71.

== Eastside Heartbeats, A New Rock ‘N’ Roll Musical ==
Eastside Heartbeats’ is a musical by Tom Waldman. Rudy Salas wrote the song "Doing It Our Way" for the show.

== Discography ==
=== Appears on ===
- Ry Cooder – Chavez Ravine
- Little Willie G. – "Three Cool Cats"
- Upground – Feel the Vibe - (2006)
