= Juliette Commagere =

American singer-songwriter

Juliette Commagere is a Los Angeles–based singer-songwriter who was formerly the lead singer and keytar player of the band Hello Stranger. In 2008, she began a solo career with the release of Queens Die Proudly.

Commagere has also performed with Maynard James Keenan of Tool's project Puscifer, The Bird and the Bee, Nick Lowe, Ry Cooder, Linda Perry and Liz Phair. She has opened for Air, Foo Fighters, The Bird and the Bee, Pete Yorn, Ry Cooder and Nick Lowe, and played the Latitude Festival with Bat for Lashes as well as co-headlining the 2nd annual Manimal Festival in Joshua Tree, CA with Warpaint, Edward Sharpe & the Magnetic Zeros and Hecuba.

Her solo work has been featured in numerous television shows and films including Private Practice, Emily Owens, M.D., Drop Dead Diva, Femme Fatales, The Power of Two, Good Dick and All the Boys Love Mandy Lane. In 2014, she did a cover of Night Ranger's power ballad "Sister Christian", which appeared in Grey's Anatomy.

She sang the female sections in Avenged Sevenfold's song "A Little Piece of Heaven" from their 2007 self-titled album. She has also sung on the album by Taylor Hawkins (of the Foo Fighters), Taylor Hawkins and the Coattail Riders, releases by Puscifer, as well as on many Ry Cooder records including: Mambo Sinuendo, Chavez Ravine, I, Flathead, My Name Is Buddy, and Ibrahim Ferrer's Buenos Hermanos. Along with her husband, Joachim Cooder, she produced Carly Ritter's self-titled debut album on Vanguard Records in 2013.

Her debut album, Queens Die Proudly, was released in 2008. In early 2010, Juliette signed with Manimal Vinyl to release her second album, The Procession. Her third album, Human, was released in 2013.

== Discography ==
- Hello Stranger (Aeronaut Records, July 25, 2006)
- Queens Die Proudly (Aeronaut Records, October 28, 2008)
- The Procession (Manimal Vinyl, September 24, 2010)
- Human (Aeronaut Records, September 17, 2013)

== Singles ==
- "Eats from the Inside" (The Procession; June 14, 2010)
- "Impact" (The Procession; December 2, 2010)
- "Vampire (Puscifer Remix)" (Single only; January 14, 2014)
- "Collide" (Human; March 11, 2014)
- "Sister Christian" (Single only; April 8, 2014)

== Collaborations ==
- "Cold Moonlight" by Totally Radd!! (The Treble Alliance, November 14, 2006)
- "A Little Piece of Heaven" by Avenged Sevenfold (Warner Bros. Records (U.S.)/WEA International (Worldwide), October 26, 2007)
- "Fly and Fly" by The Sweet Hurt (The Sweet Hurt, June 13, 2014)
- "Backing vocals on three songs on Joachim Cooder's EP Fuchsia Machu Picchu

== Personal life ==
Commagere is the daughter of a classical music record producer. She is married to the musician and producer Joachim Cooder, whom she met at high school. Her younger brother is singer-songwriter Robert Francis.
