= Junebug (song) =

Single by Robert Francis

from the album Before Nightfall
- B-side: "Nightfall"
- Released: January 4, 2010
- Genre: Rock; country rock; indie folk
- Length: 3:56
- Label: Atlantic
- Songwriter: Robert Francis
- Producer: Dave Sardy

Robert Francis singles chronology
| "Junebug" (2010) | "Keep on Running" (2010) |

"Junebug" is a song recorded by American singer-songwriter Robert Francis. The song was released on 2009 through Atlantic Records, as the lead single from his second studio album, Before Nightfall (2009).

== Background ==
Prior to recording his major label debut, Before Nightfall, Francis had a five-year relationship fall apart. "Junebug" was written about the affair, with Francis remarking, "It goes into a lot more explicit detail than a lot of other songs about how tumultuous [it] was." He told Redefine magazine that the theme of the song was the "dissipation of a relationship," noting that most of the Before Nightfall album is similarly about "growing apart from the person you love."

The song was first released for digital download and was made iTunes' Single of the Week for the week of October 11, 2009. Francis promoted the song with appearances on Last Call with Carson Daly and The Tonight Show with Jay Leno.

== Commercial performance ==
It was one of the top ten commercial airplay hits across Europe during the summer of 2010, alongside singles by Train, Owl City and Katy Perry. It debuted at number 11 on June 26, 2010, peaking at number eight on July 10. It performed best in France, where it reached number one. It was purported to be the second best-selling single in France for 2010.

"Junebug" is Francis' best-performing single. Its success contributed to his decision to part ways with major label Atlantic Records. In a later interview, he remarked:

["Junebug"] was part of the reason I had a falling out with Atlantic. They wanted five more "Junebug" songs. It's always nice to hear your song on the radio, but for the most part, I fought so hard for my albums that I don't want to be a singles-driven artist.

== Track listing ==
- Digital download
1. "Junebug" – 3:56
2. "Mescaline" (Paris Sessions) – 5:02
- Digital download – Extended play
1. "Junebug" – 3:56
2. "Mescaline" (Paris Sessions) – 5:02
3. "Wild Horses" (Paris Sessions) – 5:00
- 7" vinyl
1. "Junebug" – 3:56
2. "Nightfall" – 3:25
3. "Try" - 4:02

== Personnel ==
Credits adapted from the 7" single sleeve.

- Robert Francis – vocals, songwriting, guitar, acoustic guitar, ARP String Ensemble
- Carla Commagere – backing vocals
- Alex Kweskin – bass guitar
- Richard Gowen – drums
- Graham Lathrop – guitar
- Bill Silva – management
- Dave Sardy – record producer, mixing, piano, percussion
- Stephen Marcussen – mastering engineer

== Charts ==
| Chart (2010) | Peak position |
|---|---|
| Austria (Ö3 Austria Top 40) | 45 |
| European Airplay (Billboard) | 8 |
| France | 1 |
| Germany (GfK) | 26 |
| Portugal (AFP) | 25 |
| Switzerland (Schweizer Hitparade) | 22 |
