= Roman Renaissance =

Renaissance in Rome, a period from the mid-15th to the mid-16th centuries

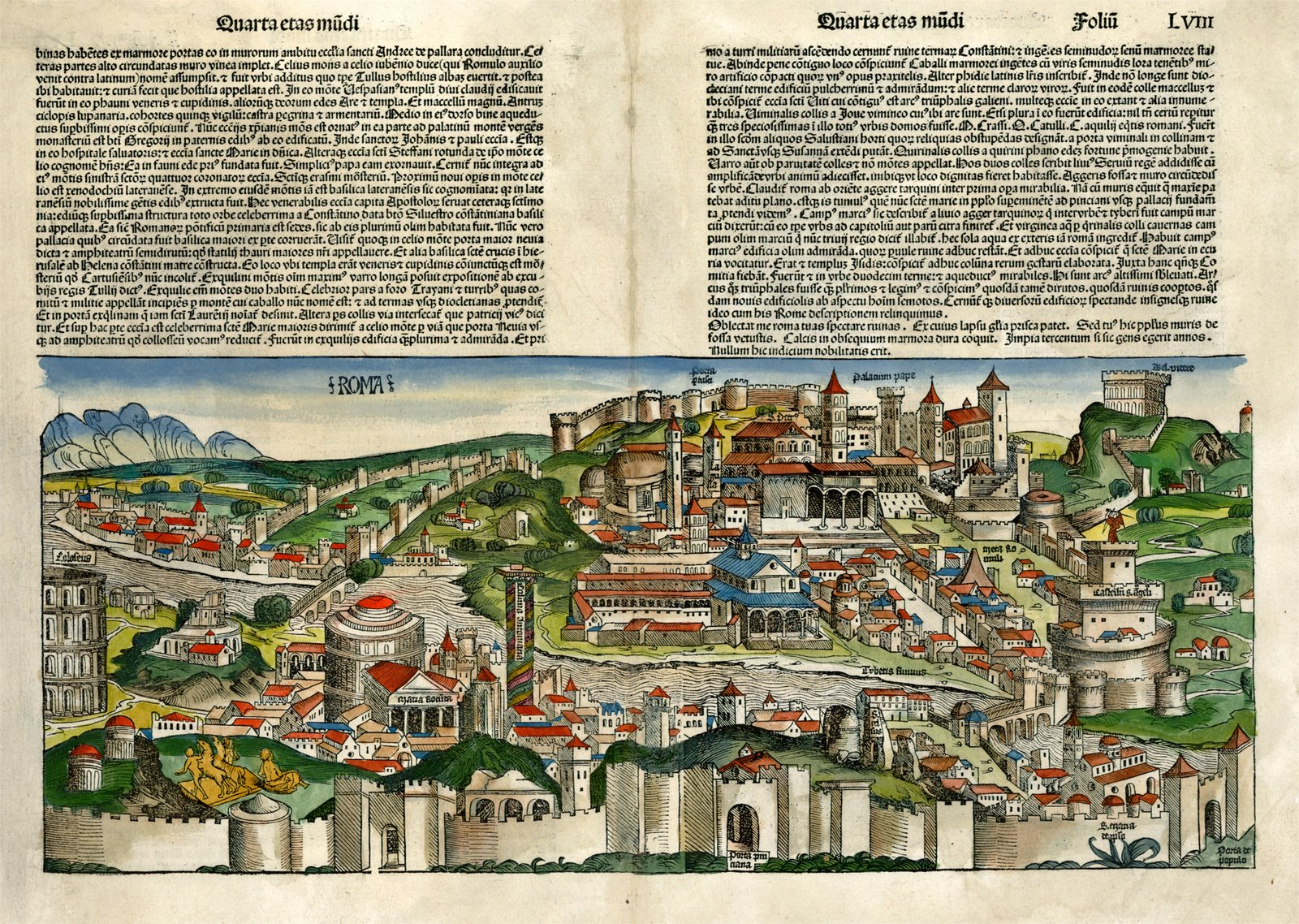
Idealized depiction of Rome from the 1493 Nuremberg Chronicle

The Renaissance in Rome occupied a period from the mid-15th to the mid-16th centuries, a period which spawned masters such as Michelangelo and Raphael, who left an indelible mark on Western figurative art. The city had been a magnet for artists wishing to study its classical ruins since the early 15th century. A revived interest in the Classics brought about the first archaeological study of Roman remains by the architect Filippo Brunelleschi and the sculptor Donatello, both Florentines. This inspired a corresponding classicism in painting and sculpture, which manifested itself in the paintings of Masaccio and Uccello. Pisanello and his assistants also frequently took inspiration from ancient remains, but their approach was essentially cataloguing, acquiring a repertoire of models to be exploited later.

In the year 1420, Pope Martin V moved the papal seat back to Rome, ending its long Avignon Papacy or "Babylonian captivity", and the Papal Schism, when several "popes" simultaneously claimed the office. He at once set to work, establishing order and restoring the dilapidated churches, palaces, bridges, and other public structures. For this reconstruction he engaged some famous masters of the Tuscan school, and thus laid the foundation for the Roman Renaissance.

Roman Renaissance art remained largely dependent on artists from further north, above all Florence, until at least the start of the 16th century. Spending by the popes and cardinals considerably increased, tempting many artists to the city.

== Historical background ==
The 14th century in Rome, with the absence of popes during the Avignon Papacy, was a century of neglect and misery. Rome dropped to its lowest level of population, and those that remained were starving and wretched. Before the return of the papacy, which was repeatedly postponed because of the bad conditions of the city and the lack of control and security, it was first necessary to strengthen the political and doctrinal aspects of the pontiff. When, in 1377, Gregory XI did return to Rome, he found his power more formal than real. It was a city in anarchy because of the struggles between the nobility and the popular faction. There followed four decades of instability, characterized locally by power struggles between the commune and the papacy, and internationally by the great Western Schism. It was finally Martin V of the Colonna family who managed to bring order to the city, laying the foundations of its rebirth.

== Martin V (1417–1431) ==
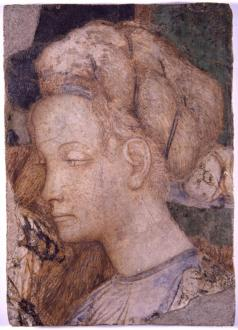
The head of a princess attributed in a cycle of Archbasilica of Saint John Lateran of Pisanello e Gentile, Museo di palazzo Venezia, Rome.

Pope Martin V was born at Genazzano in 1368. He studied at the University of Perugia, became prothonotary Apostolic under Pope Urban VI, and papal auditor and nuncio at various Italian courts under Pope Boniface IX. On 12 June 1402 he was made Cardinal Deacon of San Giorgio in Velabro. At the Council of Constance he was unanimously elected pope on 11 November 1417, and took the name Martin V in honour of Martin of Tours, whose feast fell on the day of his election. King Sigismund of Germany tried to induce Martin V to stay in Germany while France begged him to come to Avignon, but, rejecting all offers, he set out for Rome on 16 May 1418. After many detours, primarily to cement relations with the Queen of Naples, Bracco di Montone, and others, he arrived on 28 September 1420.

The first work began on the Archbasilica of Saint John Lateran, which has been badly damaged in 1413. In 1421 the church was enriched by a new Cosmatesque floor and the ceiling was repaired, while Gentile da Fabriano received a commission to create a new cycle of frescoes in the right aisle. These were completed by Pisanello after his death in 1427. The basilica also received a new monastery, assigned to the Benedictines. The pavement of the basilica and the columns were designed as signature pieces of the Colonna family.

When Cosimo de' Medici was exiled from Florence, Donatello returned to Rome, remaining until 1433. The two works that testify to his presence in this city, the Tomb of Giovanni Crivelli at Santa Maria in Aracoeli, and the ciborium at St. Peter's Basilica, bear a strong stamp of classical influence. Brunelleschi also returned several times to find inspiration for what was the Renaissance art. While in Florence, Masaccio, first great Italian painter of the Quattrocento, became friends with Brunelleschi and Donatello, and at their prompting in 1423 travelled to Rome, along with his mentor Masolino. From that point he was freed of all Gothic and Byzantine influence, as may be seen in his altarpiece for the Carmelite Church in Pisa. The traces of influences from ancient Roman and Greek art that are present in some of Masaccio's works must also have originated from this trip. Unfortunately, any further innovation was curtailed by Masaccio's premature death at the age of 27.

== Eugene IV (1431–1447) ==
Eugenius IV (Gabriello Condulmaro, or Condulmerio) was born in Venice in 1388, of a wealthy family. He was nephew to Pope Gregory XII. His service to Pope Martin V was such that he was elected to the papacy on the first scrutiny. However, his papacy was destined to be a stormy one. In 1434, a revolution, fomented by the pope's enemies, broke out in Rome. Eugene escaped down the Tiber to Ostia, where the friendly Florentines were only too happy to receive him. He took up his residence in the Dominican convent of Santa Maria Novella, and sent Vitelleschi, the militant Bishop of Recanati, to restore order in the Papal States. Florence at that time was the centre of literary activity, and clearly influenced the Humanist movement. During his stay in the Tuscan capital, Eugene consecrated the Florence Cathedral, just then finished by Brunelleschi.

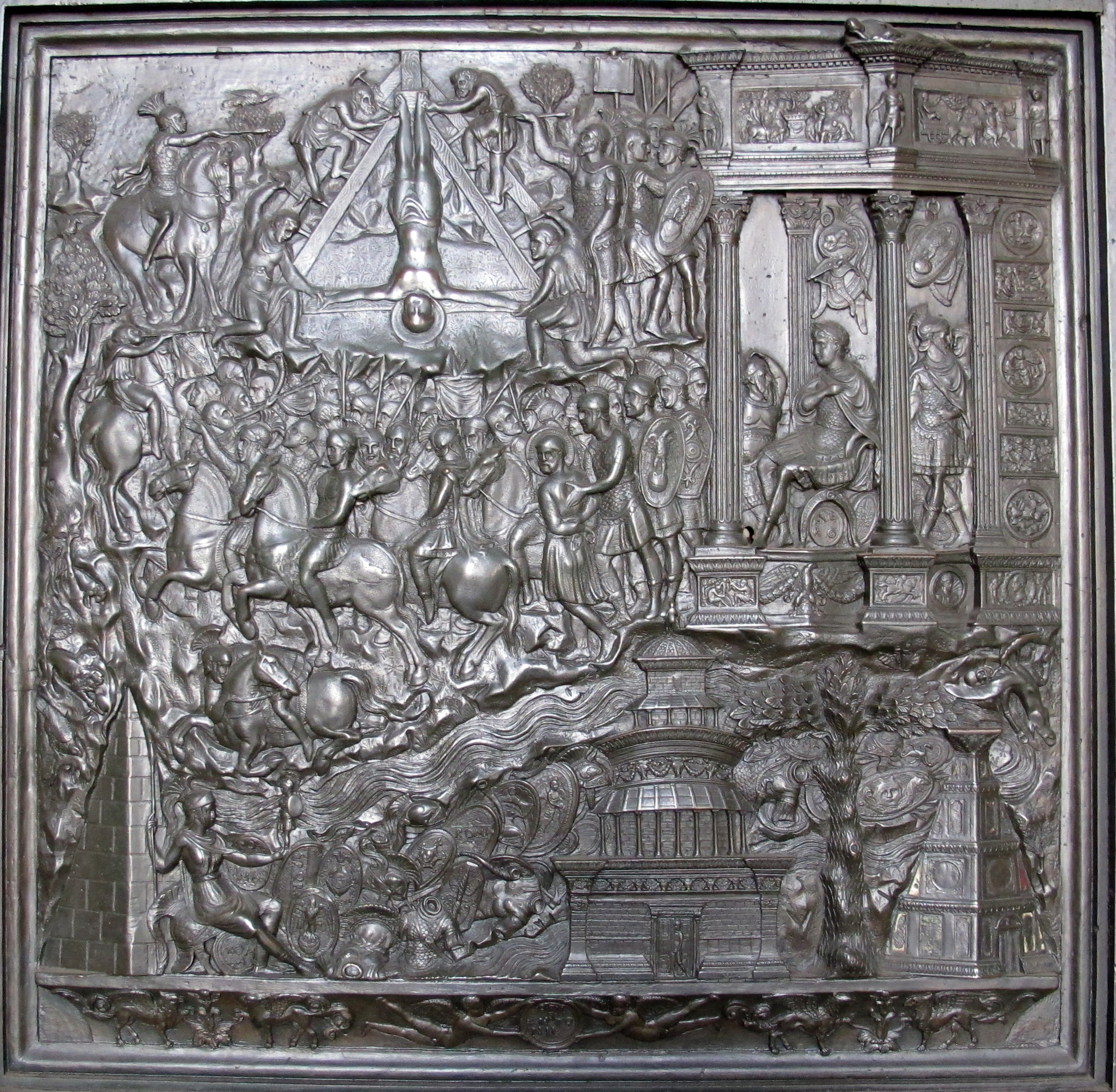
Martyrdom of Saint Peter, Filarete bronze door for the Old St. Peter's Basilica in Rome

Pope Eugene IV continued in this vein in Rome, commissioning the Florentine Antonio di Pietro Averlino, known as Filarete (1400–1469), to make two bronze doors, (imposts), for the Old St. Peter's Basilica, completed in 1445.

In 1443–1445, Leon Battista Alberti, whose many talents truly epitomised the "Renaissance Man", wrote the Descriptio urbis Romae, where he proposed a system for a geometric arrangement of the city centred on the Capitoline Hill. He later became the architectural advisor to Pope Nicholas V and was involved in a number of projects at the Vatican. Shortly after they arrived in town, Beato Angelico and French Jean Fouquet began a series of frescoes in the Old St. Peter's Basilica, which testifies to the presence of the nascent interest in Flemish painting and the Nordic generally. Although the duration of the pontificate of Eugene IV did not allow for the full implementation of his plans, Rome became a fruitful meeting ground for artists of different schools. This would soon spawn a common style, which for the first time be defined as "Roman".

== Nicholas V (1447–1455) ==
The collaboration between Alberti and Pope Nicholas V gave rise to the first grandiose building projects of Renaissance Rome. The plan for the city focused primarily on five main points:

- restore the walls
- restoration or reconstruction of the forty churches in the city
- reset the Borgo district
- expansion of the Old St. Peter's Basilica
- restoration of the Apostolic Palace

The intent was to gain a citadel of religion that had its focal point on the Capitoline Hill. The project's aim was to exalt the power of the Church, clearly demonstrating the continuity between the Imperial and Christian Rome. It was to Nicholas V that Alberti dedicated in 1452 the monumental theoretical result of his long study of Vitruvius. This was his De re aedificatoria (On the Art of Building), not a restored text of Vitruvius but a wholly new work. It became a bible of Renaissance architecture, for it incorporated and made advances upon the engineering knowledge of antiquity, and grounded the stylistic principles of classical art into a fully developed aesthetic theory.

Due to the brevity of the pontificate of Pope Nicholas V, all the ambitious projects could not be completed. However, it made artists who shared an interest in the antiquity and charm of the classic ruins converge (especially the Tuscan and Lombard ones). This led to a certain homogeneity of their work.

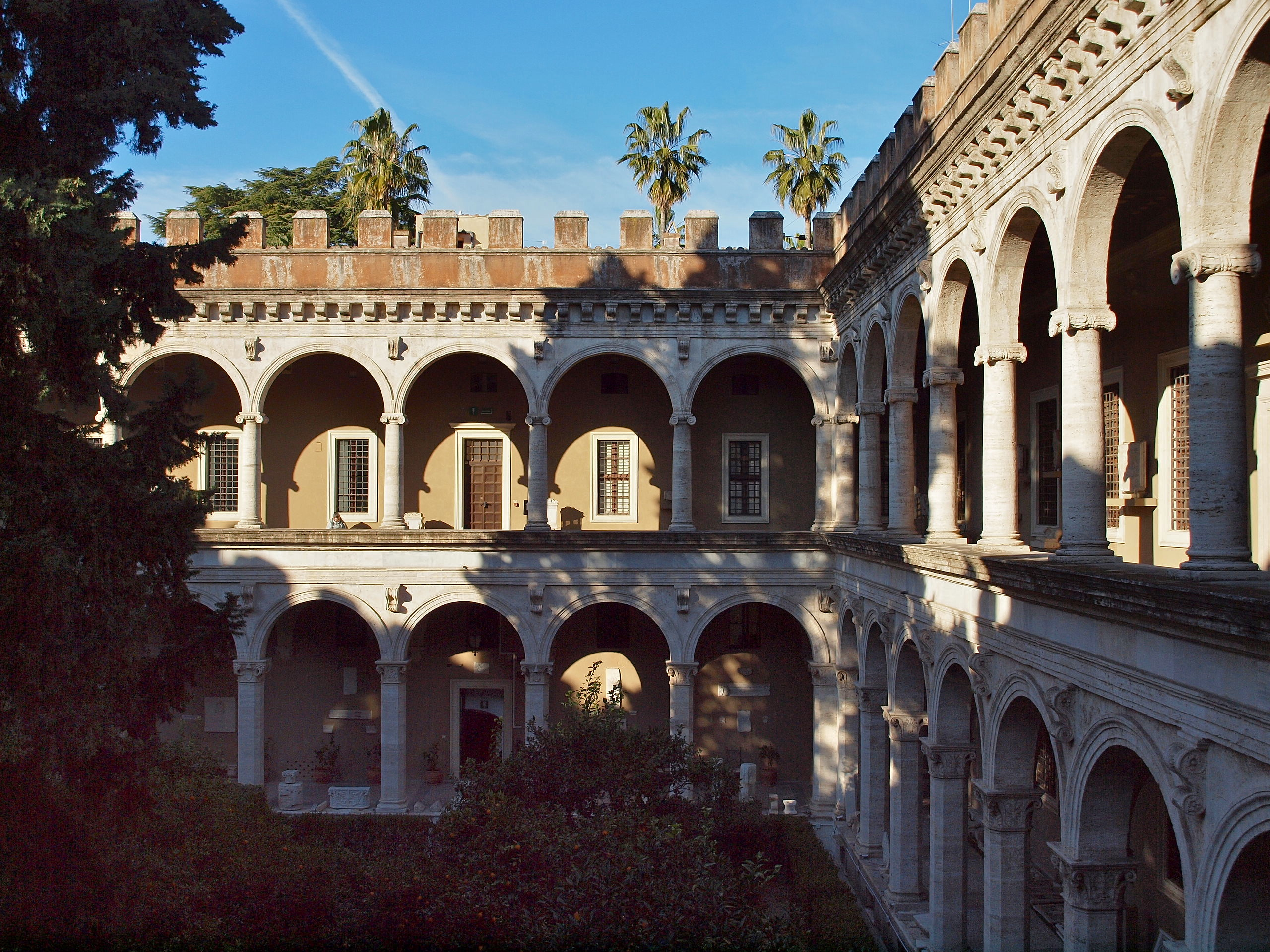
Palazzo Venezia, the courtyard of the Palazzetto

A paradigmatic example of the style that developed in that period in architecture is Palazzo Venezia, started in 1455, that incorporating existing buildings. The courtyard of the annexed Palazzetto is taken from Roman elements combined, but without philological rigor. It incorporates the model of the viridarium and is inspired by the Colosseum in the overlapped architectural orders, and in the cornice with ornament in brackets. The width of the arches, however, is reduced and simplified so they will not look too impressive compared to the spaces they enclose. In the building itself (built from 1466), there was a more faithful revival of ancient models, which shows a gradually deeper understanding. For example, the hall was once a lacunar in concrete (taken from Pantheon or the Basilica of Maxentius) with overlapping orders and partially leaning on the pillars, as in the Colosseum or in the Theatre of Marcellus.

The renewal of the Constantinian Old St Peter's Basilica was assigned to Bernardo Rossellino. The body was expanded with five aisles and longitudinal cross vaults on pillars that were to incorporate the old columns. The apse was rebuilt with the expansion of the transept, a choir was added, which was the logical continuation of the nave, and also a domed room at the intersection of the transept and choir. This configuration influenced the next plan by Bramante for a total overhaul of the building, which retained what was already built. Work began around 1450, but with the death of the Pope had no further development, and stagnated until Julius II decided for a complete reconstruction.

The renewal of the Apostolic Palace was a first step in the decoration of the private chapel of the Pope, the Niccoline Chapel, by Fra Angelico and his assistant Benozzo Gozzoli. The decoration includes stories of St. Lawrence and St. Stephen, which were interpreted by Fra Angelico in a style rich in details, erudite, and where his "Christian humanism" is expressed in its vertices. The scenes are set in majestic architecture, born from the suggestions of ancient Rome and early Christian times, but not slavish, perhaps mindful of the projects that then circulated in the papal court for the restoration of St. Peter. The figures are solid, calm and solemn, the tone was generally more stately, exemplifying the meditative artist.

The Jubilee celebration of 1475 injected revenue that inspired a number of projects and allowed the Pope to draw a large number of artists together. There were various collaborations between artists such as, Vivarini, Bartolomeo di Tommaso, Benedetto Bonfigli, Andrea del Castagno, Piero della Francesca, and perhaps Rogier van der Weyden. This wealth of ideas prepared the ground for the synthesis towards the end of the century, and led to the creation of a language properly "Roman".

== Sixtus IV (1471–1484) ==
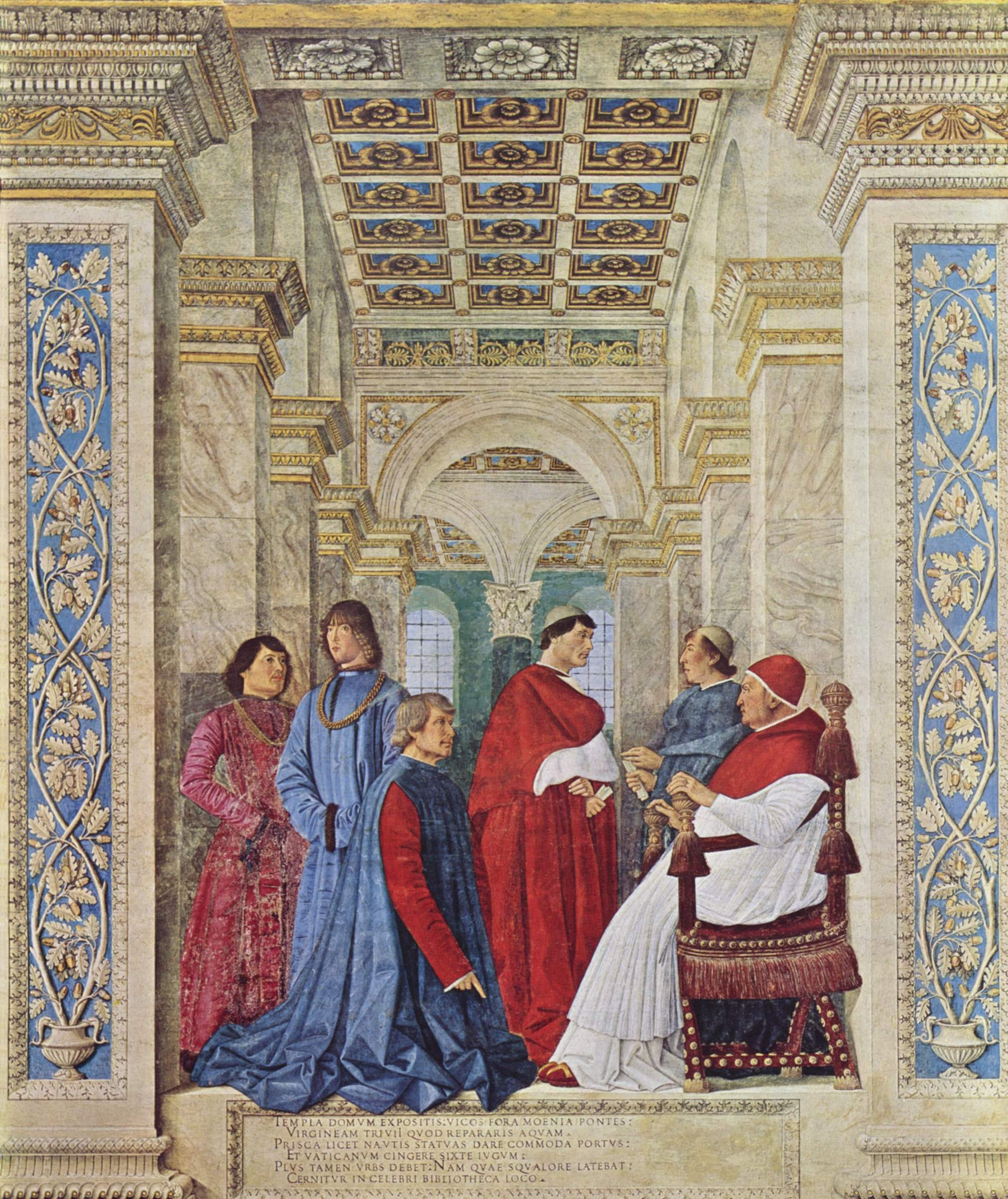
Melozzo da Forlì, Sixtus IV Appointing Platina as Prefect of the Vatican Library (1477).

Pope Sixtus IV created the Vatican Library and entrusted it to the humanist Melozzo da Forlì, the Papal painter. He frescoed one of the emblems of the Roman humanist culture of the time, Pope Sixtus IV Appoints Platina as Prefect of the Vatican Library (1477), in which the pope is portrayed among his relatives in opulent classical architecture. A few years later, under Giuliano della Rovere, Melozzo painted the apse of the Basilica dei Santi Apostoli with Ascension of the Apostles between Playing Angels, considered the first example of the view "from down to top".

The Sistine Chapel takes its name from Pope Sixtus IV, who had the old Cappella Magna restored between 1477 and 1480. It was originally to be decorated by artists from Umbria and Marche. But through the intercession of Lorenzo de' Medici, the commission of the wall decoration was instead entrusted to the best Florentine artists of the time, Sandro Botticelli, Pietro Perugino, Pinturicchio, Domenico Ghirlandaio, and Cosimo Roselli. They created a series of frescos depicting the Life of Moses and the Life of Christ, offset by papal portraits above and trompe-l'œil drapery below. The work on the frescoes began in 1481 and was concluded in 1482. This is also the date of the works in marble: the screen, the choir stalls, and the pontifical coat of arms over the entrance door. On 15 August 1483 Sixtus IV celebrated the first mass when the chapel was consecrated and dedicated to the Virgin Mary. The Sistine Chapel, now the seat of the most important ceremonies of the papacy, became a point of reference for Renaissance art, setting a milestone for the character developments of the late 15th century.

== Alexander VI (1492–1503) ==
The last part of this century was dominated by the figure of Pope Alexander VI, from the Spanish family Borgia. He first turned his attention to the defence of the Eternal City. He changed the Mausoleum of Hadrian into a fortress, likewise Torre di Nona, to secure the city from naval attacks. His Via Alessandrina, now called Via della Conciliazione, remains to the present day the grand approach to St. Peter's. Though a scandalous pope, he was a patron of the arts and sciences, and in his days a new architectural era was initiated in Rome with the coming of Bramante. Raphael, Michelangelo and Pinturicchio. He commissioned Pinturicchio to lavishly paint a suite of rooms in the Apostolic Palace in the Vatican, which are today known as the Borgia Apartments.

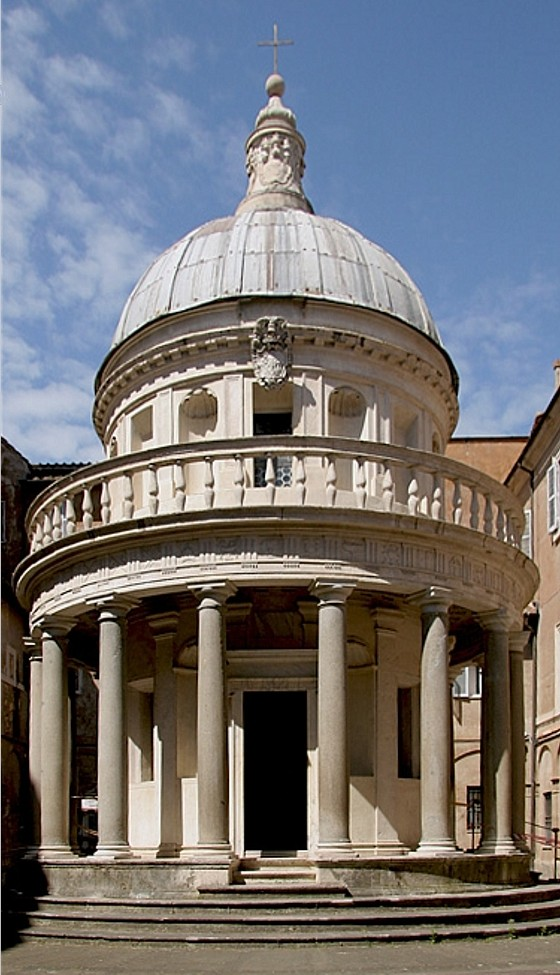
The Tempietto at San Pietro in Montorio by Donato Bramante

In addition to the structures erected by himself, his memory is associated with the many others built by monarchs and cardinals at his instigation. During his reign, Bramante designed for Ferdinand II of Aragon the Tempietto di San Pietro in Montorio, on the traditional site of St. Peter's martyrdom. Bramante built for Cardinal Raffaele Riario the Palazzo della Cancelleria. In 1500, the ambassador of Emperor Maximilian laid the cornerstone of the national church of the Germans, Santa Maria dell'Anima, the French Cardinal Briçonnet erected Trinità dei Monti, and the Spaniards Santa Maria in Monserrato degli Spagnoli. To Alexander we owe the beautiful ceiling of Santa Maria Maggiore, in the decoration of which he employed the first gold brought from America by Columbus.

== Julius II (1503–1513) ==
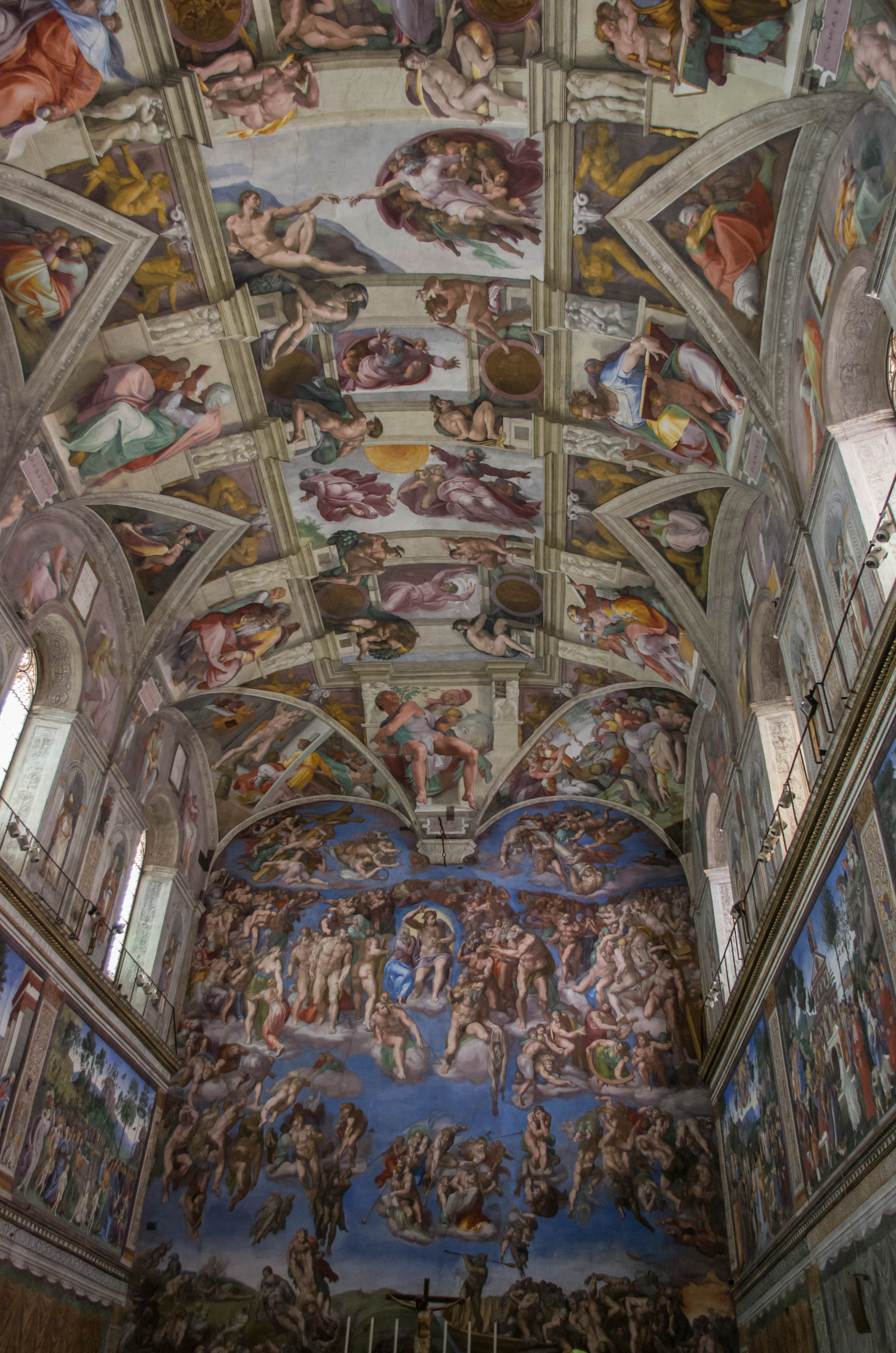
Michelangelo's frescoes in the Sistine Chapel

In 1503 Julius II was elected pope after the short reign of Pope Pius III. He was chiefly a soldier, and his fame is greatly due to his re-establishment of the Pontifical States and the deliverance of Italy from its subjection to France. But he also gained a reputation as a patron of the arts. Bramante, Raphael, and Michelangelo contributed some of their greatest masterpieces during his time. He laid the cornerstone of the Basilica of St. Peter on 18 April 1506, and united the Vatican Palace with the Villa Belvedere, engaging Bramante to accomplish the project. The famous frescoes of Michelangelo in the Sistine Chapel and the Raphael Rooms in the Apostolic Palace, the Court of St. Damasus with its loggias, the Via Giulia and Via della Lungara, even the statue of Moses which graces his tomb in the church of San Pietro in Vincoli, are lasting witnesses of his great love of art.

== Leo X 1513-1521 ==
The Medici Pope Leo X was a lover and patron of the arts and sciences, and probably did more than any pope to establish Rome as the centre of European culture. He had San Giovanni dei Fiorentini, on the Via Giulia, built, after designs by Jacopo Sansovino and pressed forward on the reconstruction of St Peter's Basilica and the Vatican under Raphael and Agostino Chigi.

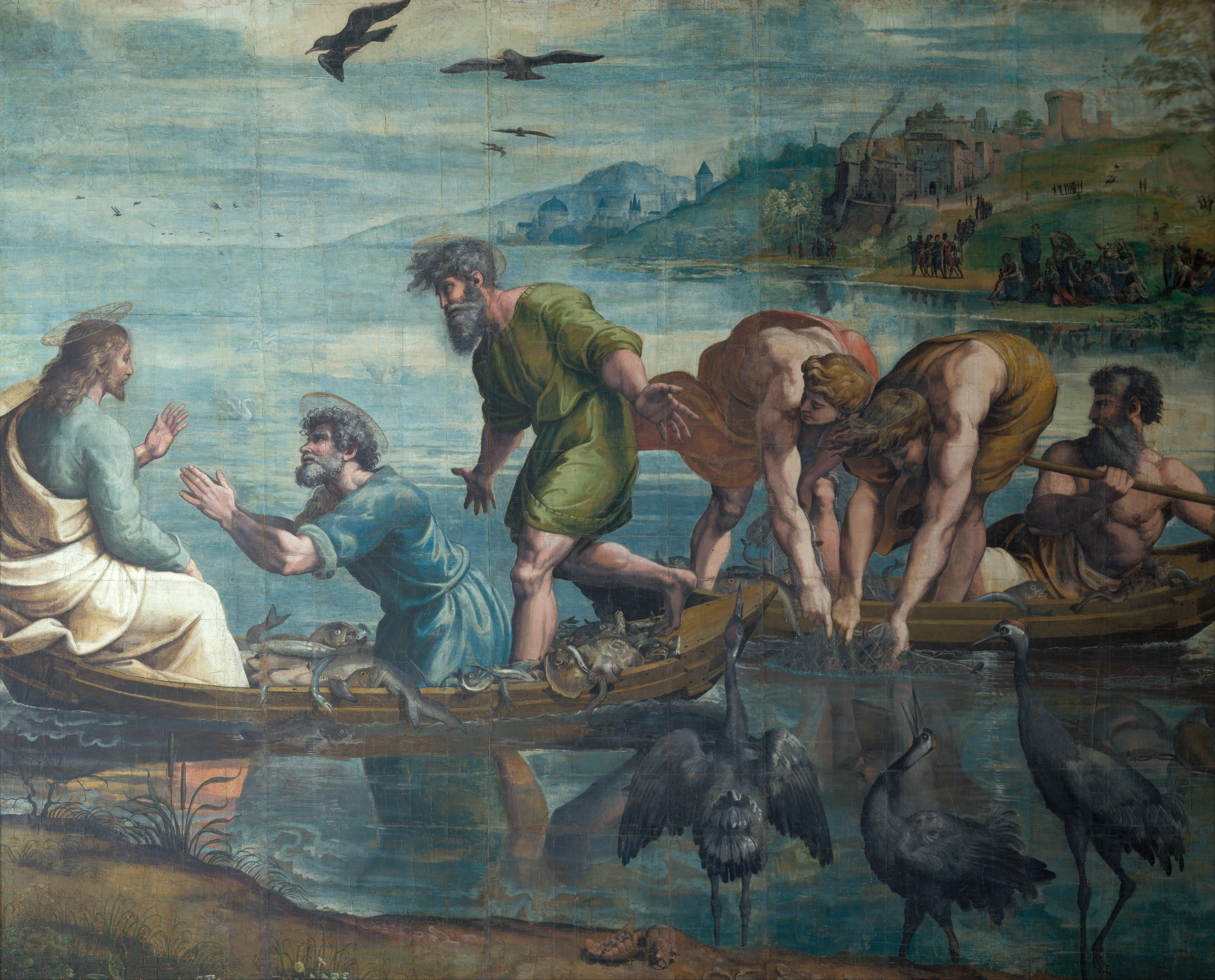
The Raphael Cartoons: The Miraculous Draught of Fishes

He encouraged painting in particular, and Raphael benefitted enormously under his patronage. "Everything pertaining to art the pope turns over to Raphael", wrote an ambassador in 1518. He finished the decoration of the Stanze begun under Julius II, even referring to Leo X in some of the scenes. He painted the Raphael Cartoons for the tapestries of the Sistine Chapel, which represent scenes from the lives of Saints Peter and Paul, the most magnificent of them being St. Peter's miraculous draught of fishes and St. Paul preaching in Athens. A third famous enterprise was the decoration of the Vatican Loggia done by Raphael's pupils under his direction, and mostly from his designs. The most exquisite of his paintings are the Sistine Madonna and the Transfiguration.

Sculpture was not as favored under Leo X as painting, and while Michelangelo worked on a marble façade for the Church of San Lorenzo in Florence, he did not finish it. The greatest and most difficult task was the continuation of the new St. Peter's. Bramante remained its chief architect until his death in 1514. Raphael succeeded him, but in his six years of office little was done, much to his regret, through lack of means.

Leo X has spent all the money carefully saved by his predecessor Julius II. He sold indulgences to help pay for it, a mistake which helped lead to the Protestant Reformation. Leo's reign was followed by the brief papacy of Pope Adrian VI, and then that of Leo's cousin Pope Clement VII from 1523.

== After the Sack of 1527 ==
The brutal Sack of Rome in 1527, by the troops of the Emperor Charles V, brought the Roman High Renaissance to an abrupt end. Some artists were killed, and most of the rest fled to other cities, as did their patrons in the Curia. When artistic activity revived, it was mostly in the Mannerist style. The so-called Counter-Maniera style was a reaction to Mannerist excesses supported by several patrons around the mid-century, with plainer and more naturalist depictions in the spirit of the Counter-Reformation.

Rome once again became a driving centre of art at the end of the century, with the start of the Baroque.
