= Aeronaut Records =

American independent record label

Aeronaut Records is an independently owned record label based in Los Angeles, California which was founded in 2002 by John Mastro. The releases on Aeronaut are distributed by Redeye Distribution in North Carolina.

Aeronaut Records has the distinction of having two faux French bands from New York City in its catalogue; Les Sans Culottes and Nous Non Plus. An article entitled Nom de Guerre chronicled the discord in the former band and the formation of the latter band and was published in Slate (magazine) in Oct. 2005. In addition, Aeronaut has released the debut albums from artists such as Robert Francis, currently signed to Vanguard Records, Juliette Commagére, Daisy McCrackin, Golem, last on JDub, The Shys, and The Bangkok Five.

== Roster ==
=== Current artists ===
- Robert Francis
- Juliette Commagere
- Nous Non Plus
- The Shys
- Joachim Cooder

=== Former artists ===
- Les Sans Culottes
- Golem
- Hello Stranger
- The Scooters

== See also ==
- List of record labels
