= MusiCares =

Non-profit organization

MusiCares Foundation, Inc.
- Founded: December 29, 1993; 32 years ago
- Legal status: 501(c)(3) charitable organization
- Headquarters: Santa Monica, California, United States
- Chair: Carianne Marshall
- President/CEO: Harvey Mason Jr.
- Affiliations: National Academy of Recording Arts and Sciences, NARAS Foundation, Grammy Museum Foundation, NARAS Properties, Latin Academy of Recording Arts & Sciences, Latin Grammy Cultural Foundation
- Endowment: $10,095,404
- Website: musicares.org

MusiCares Foundation is a non-profit organization established in 1989 and incorporated in 1993 by the National Academy of Recording Arts and Sciences. Meant for musicians to have a place to turn to in times of financial, personal, or medical crisis, its primary purpose is to focus the resources and attention of the music industry on human service issues which directly impact the health and welfare of the music community. The foundation's programs include emergency financial assistance, addiction recovery, outreach and leadership activities, and senior housing. MusiCares also offers hearing clinics backstage at several major festivals around the U.S. to help musicians protect their ears.

In September 2004, MusiCares acquired the Musicians Assistance Program, a similar program assisting musicians in need, including drug rehabilitation.

MusiCares awards recording artists with the "Person of the Year Award", to commend musicians for their artistic achievement in the music industry and dedication to philanthropy, and with the "Stevie Ray Vaughan Award", to honor musicians on their commitment to helping others in the addiction recovery process.

== MusiCares MAP Fund Benefit Concert ==
To help raise funding for the program, a MusiCares MAP Fund Benefit Concert is held annually since 2005. Among the awards given at the event is the Stevie Ray Vaughan Award, named after the late guitarist Stevie Ray Vaughan, which recognizes musicians for their devotion to helping other addicts struggling with the recovery process.

Founded by longtime musician and addiction recovery activist Buddy Arnold, the event was originally called Musicians' Assistance Program (MAP) Awards. In 2004, MusiCares acquired MAP and merged the two programs under the MusiCares banner.

The 2010 Musicares MAP Fund benefit concert celebrated Women In Recovery and honored former U.S. first lady Betty Ford and the Betty Ford Center. Susan Ford Bales accepted the MusiCares MAP Fund award on behalf of her mother.

=== Stevie Ray Vaughan Award ===
Recipients

- 1999: Eric Clapton
- 2000: David Crosby
- 2001: Bonnie Raitt
- 2002: Ivan Neville
- 2003: Steven Tyler

Awards given after the MusiCares/MAP merger

- 2005: Dave Navarro
- 2006: James Hetfield
- 2007: Chris Cornell
- 2008: Alice Cooper
- 2009: Anthony Kiedis
- 2011: Dave Gahan
- 2012: Jerry Cantrell
- 2013: Chester Bennington
- 2014: Ozzy Osbourne
- 2015: Pete Townshend
- 2016: Smokey Robinson
- 2017: Adam Clayton
- 2018: Mike McCready
- 2019: Macklemore

=== MusiCares From the Heart Award ===
The MusiCares From the Heart Award is given to artists for their unconditional friendship and dedication to the mission and goals of the organization during the MusiCares MAP Fund Benefit Concert. The first recipient was Goldenvoice in memory of Rick Van Santen.

Recipients

- 2005: Goldenvoice (in memory of Rick Van Santen)
- 2006: Bill Silva
- 2007: Jeff McClusky
- 2008: Slash
- 2011: Kevin Lyman
- 2012: Neil Lasher (deceased 2020, 73 years)
- 2013: Tony Alva
- 2014: Jeff Greenberg
- 2015: Bill Curbishley

== See also ==
- MusiCares Person of the Year
- MusiCares COVID-19 Relief Fund
