= Nous Non Plus =

Indie rock band

Nous Non Plus (French for "Neither ( do or are ) we") is a faux-French indie rock band based out of New York City. The band consists of Céline Dijon (vocals, Verena Wiesendanger), Jean-Luc Retard (bass and vocals, Dan Crane), Bonnie Day (vocals, violin and tambourine), Cal d'Hommage (guitar, Jeremy Parzen), Professeur Harry Covert (drums), Morris "Mars" Chevrolet (synthesizer), and François Hardonne (keyboard and trumpet). Nous Non Plus records with Aeronaut Records and is distributed by RedEye Distribution.

The band formed in 2005, after a messy separation from the original band Les Sans Culottes. The band members had been disgruntled or felt threatened by the band leader, Clermont Ferrand. Upon voting him out of the band, he took the remaining band members to court to fight over the rights for the name of the band. Ferrand, a lawyer, represented himself. After a few days in court, the other members decided the legal costs were going to be too steep and Ferrand could out last them. Ferrand was free to use the Les Sans Culottes name, and refilled the ranks of the band. The rest of the core members continued on under the name Nous Non Plus.
