= Jeremy Parzen =

American wine writer

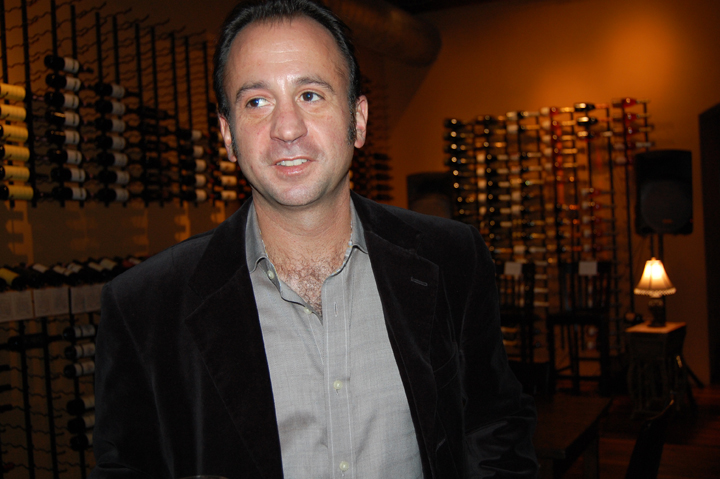
- Born: 1967 (age 58–59); Chicago, Illinois, U.S.
- Education: University of California, Los Angeles
- Occupations: Writer; educator; blogger; historian; musician

Jeremy Parzen (born 1967 in Chicago, Illinois, United States) is an American wine writer and educator, blogger, food and wine historian, and musician who resides in Houston, Texas. He is author of the wine and lifestyle blog, Do Bianchi, and was a co-editor, together with Italian wine writer Franco Ziliani, of VinoWire, a blog devoted to news from the world of Italian wine.

Parzen received his doctorate in Italian literature and language at the University of California, Los Angeles in 1997 (with a dissertation on Petrarchan prosody and Renaissance transcriptions of the Rerum vulgarium fragmenta) and lived and worked for many years between Los Angeles and Italy as an instructor of Italian language and musician beginning in 1989, when he launched his academic career. In 1997, he moved to New York City, where he began to work as an editor at La Cucina Italiana and ultimately became its chief wine writer before leaving to pursue an independent career as a wine and food writer.

From 2013 onward, he has worked as a freelance writer and marketing consultant in the wine industry. His byline has appeared in numerous publications, including Wine & Spirits and Decanter, and he is the author of a number of university-press translations, including The Art of Cooking (University of California Press, 2005) by 15th-century chef Maestro Martino of Como and The History of Italian Cinema (Princeton, 2009), by Gian Piero Brunetta.

Parzen plays in the musical group Nous Non Plus under the stage name Cal d'Hommage. He is also credited as being a co writer of some of the band's material.
