= Martino da Como =

15th-century Italian culinary expert

Martino da Como, or Martino de Rossi and Martino de Rubeis, called Maestro Martino from Como, born in the Blenio Valley (in the Italian speaking part of today's Switzerland), was a 15th-century culinary expert who was unequalled in his field at the time and could be considered the Western world's first celebrity chef. He made his career in Italy and was the chef at the Roman palazzo of the papal chamberlain ("camerlengo"), the Patriarch of Aquileia. Martino was applauded by his peers, earning him the epitaph of the prince of cooks. His book Libro de Arte Coquinaria (The Art of Cooking) (c. 1465) is considered a landmark in Italian gastronomic literature and a historical record of the transition from medieval to Renaissance cuisine.

== Biography ==
Maestro Martino was born around 1430 in Torre, a village in the Blenio Valley, then in the Duchy of Milan, today in Canton Ticino, Switzerland. His early career probably began in northern Italy, as he is referred to variously as both Martino di Como and Martino di Milano, but it seems likely that he spent some time in Naples as many of his recipes show the influence of Spanish cuisine and with the Catalan manuscript Llibre de Sent Soví, Naples having come under lasting Catalan influence after its conquest by Alfonso V of Aragon in 1442.

Between 1460 and 1470 he made his way to Rome in order to cook for Ludovico Trevisan, Cardinal Patriarch of Aquileia, who made a name out of lavish banquets and opulent receptions. Later, his services passed on to Gian Giacomo Trivulzio, a Milanese condottiere (adventurer) and eventually he ended up at the Vatican.

Little more is known about Martino but he was described by his friend Bartolomeo Sacchi (known as Platina) as "Prince of cooks from whom I learned all about cooking" in De honesta voluptate et valetudine (On Honorable Pleasure and Good Health) (1474). Platina openly acknowledges in his book that most of his recipes came from Martino whom he compared to a Greek philosopher in his ability to improvise on a culinary theme.

== Bibliography ==
Martino's book of recipes named the Liber de arte coquinaria is one of the benchmarks of early European gastronomical literature, a precious testimony of kitchen etiquette and recipes in the Middle Ages. The recipes in this tome were highly influential during the 15th century, so much so that Bartolomeo Sacchi (known as il Platina) the humanist philosopher and papal librarian, liberally included large portions of its text into his own work on culinary art entitled De Honesta Voluptae et Valetudine. In fact, almost half of Platina's book is a direct copy of Martino's opus. In acknowledgement of Martino, Platina stated "O immortal gods, which cook could compete with my friend Martino of Como, to a great extent the origin of what is written here?"

The first mention of a vermicelli recipe is in the book De arte Coquinaria per vermicelli e maccaroni siciliani (The Art of Cooking Sicilian Macaroni and Vermicelli), compiled by Martino. In Martino's Libro de arte coquinaria, there are several recipes for vermicelli, which can last two or three years (doi o tre anni) when dried in the sun.

== English translations ==
- Ballerini, Luigi, ed. (2005). The Art of Cooking: The First Modern Cookery Book. Translated and annotated by Parzen, Jeremy (with fifty modernized recipes by Barzini, Stefania). University of California Press. ISBN 978-0-520-92831-2.
- Riley, Gillian (translator) (2005). Maestro Martino: Libro de Arte Coquinaria (CD-ROM). Oakland, CA: Octavo. ISBN 1-891788-83-3.
