= Bartolomeo Platina =

Italian humanist writer and gastronomist (1421–1481)

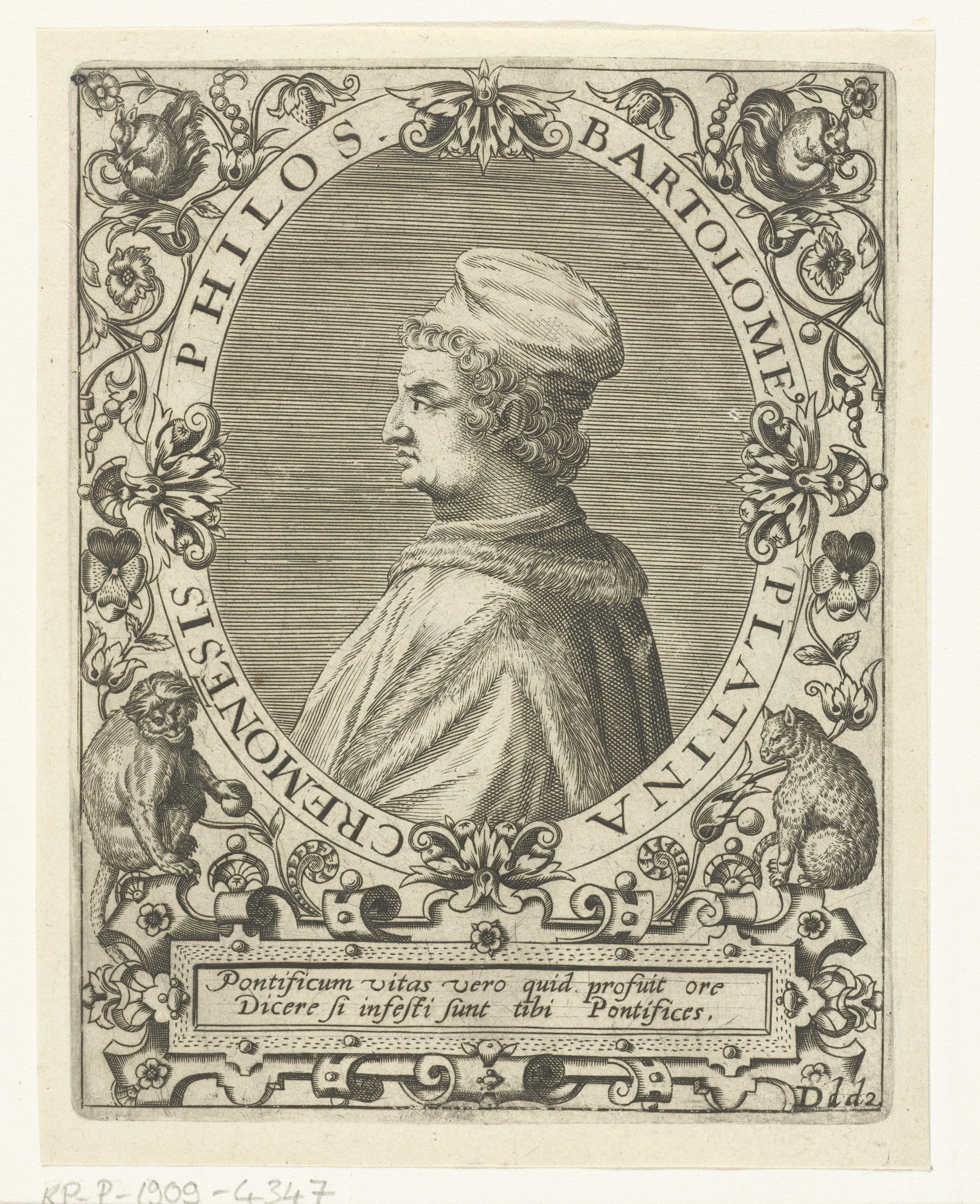
Portrait of Bartolomeo Platina. Engraving by Theodor de Bry from J.-J. Boissard, Icones virorum illustrium doctrina & eruditione praestantium

Bartolomeo Sacchi (Italian: [ˌbartɔlɔˈmɛɔ ˈsakki]; 1421 – 21 September 1481), known as il Platina (Italian: [il ˈplatina]) after his birthplace of Piadena, was an Italian Renaissance humanist writer and gastronomist, author of what is considered the first printed cookbook.

Platina started his career as a private soldier, before gaining long-term patronage from the Gonzagas. He studied under the Byzantine humanist philosopher John Argyropulos in Florence, where he frequented other fellow humanists, as well as members of the ruling Medici family. Around 1464, Platina purchased a post as a papal writer under the humanist Pius II, and became a member of the Platonism-influenced Roman Academy founded by Pomponio Leto.

Platina's papal employment was abruptly curtailed on the arrival of the anti-humanist Pope Paul II, who imprisoned Platina in Castel Sant'Angelo during the winter of 1464–65. In 1468 Platina was again confined in Castel Sant'Angelo for a further year, where he was interrogated under torture, following accusations that members of Julius Pomponius Laetus's Roman Academy were plotting to assassinate the Pope.

Platina's fortunes were revived by the return to power of the strongly pro-humanist pope, Sixtus IV, who in 1475 made him Vatican librarian. He was granted the post after writing a history of the lives of the popes with reference to general Roman history and the themes of Antiquity, a work deeply unsympathetic to Paul II.

== Biography ==
Platina was born at Piadena (Latin: Platina), near Cremona, in 1421. As a young man, he spent four years as a private soldier employed by condottieri, in the armies of Francesco I Sforza and Francesco Piccinino. Later, in Mantua, Platina was appointed tutor to the sons of the Ludovico III Gonzaga, a position previously held by Iacopo da San Cassiano and Ognibene Bonisoli. In 1457 he went to Florence to study Greek from the Byzantine humanist scholar Argyropulos. There, carrying a letter of introduction from Ludovico, he befriended Cosimo de' Medici, as well as the prominent humanist Bessarion.

In 1462, Platina proceeded to Rome in the suite of Ludovico's son, Cardinal Francesco Gonzaga. Pius II having reorganized the College of Abbreviators in 1463 and increased their number to seventy, Platina was able to buy a sinecure, becoming a member in May 1464. When Paul II succeeded Pius II and revoked his ordinances, Platina and the other new members were deprived of their offices. Platina wrote a number of angry letters to Pius II on this topic, culminating in Platina's imprisonment in the Castel Sant'Angelo. Platina was released after four months, through the intervention of Gonzaga and Bessarion, on the condition that he remain in Rome.

During his time in Rome, Platina had become associated with the Accademia Romana, a circle of about twenty humanists led by Pomponio. In 1468, the group was imprisoned on suspicion of various charges, including heresy, immorality, and conspiracy against the Pope. The latter charge was dropped for lack of evidence, while they were acquitted of the former. However, members of the Roman Academy were found guilty of immorality.

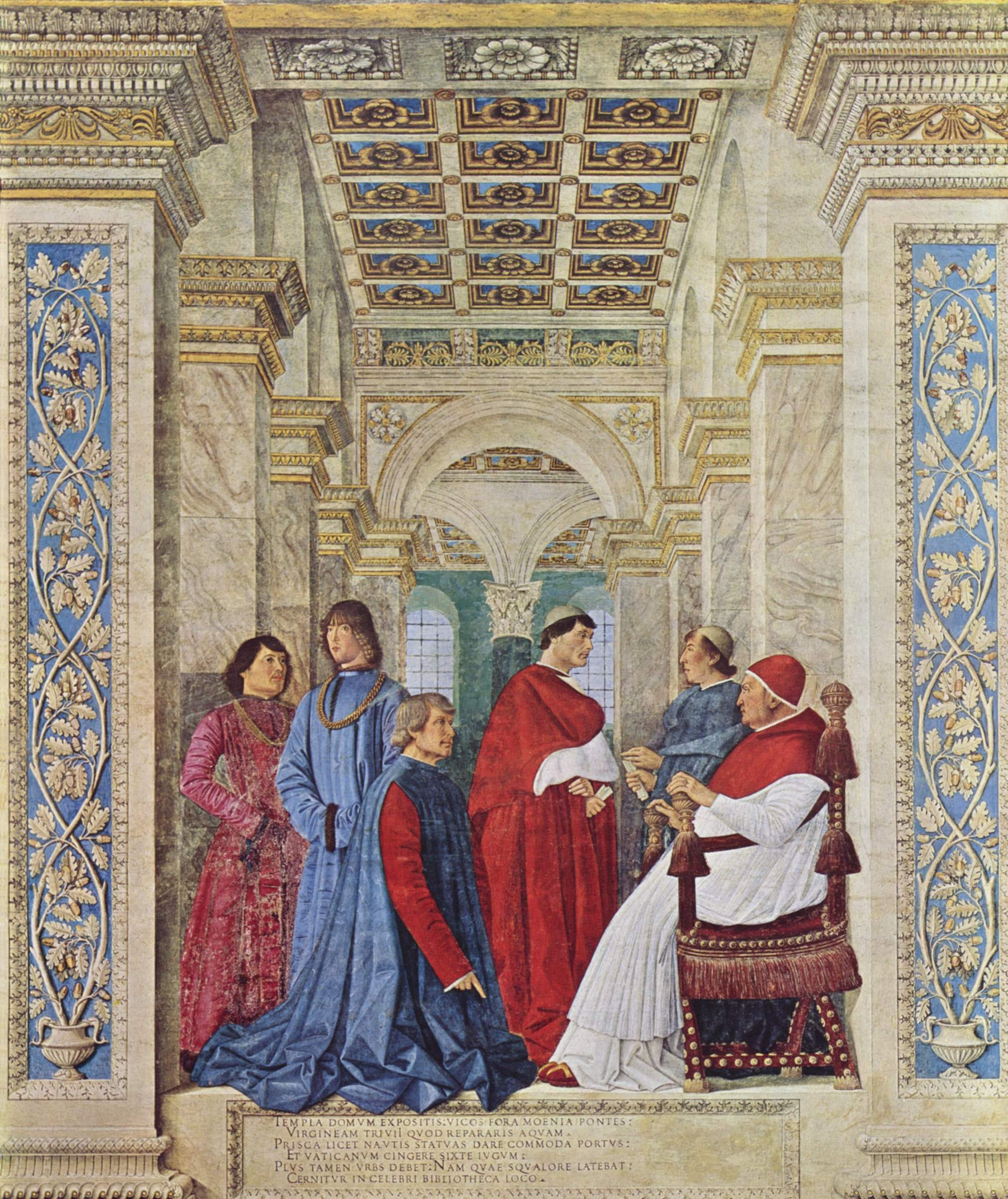
Pope Sixtus IV Appoints Platina Prefect of the Vatican Library, fresco by Melozzo da Forlì, c. 1477, (Vatican Museums)

After his release on 7 July 1469, he expected to be again in the employ of Paul II, who, however, declined his services. Platina threatened vengeance and executed his threat when, at the suggestion of Sixtus IV, he wrote his Vitæ Pontificum Platinæ historici liber de vita Christi ac omnium pontificum qui hactenus ducenti fuere et XX (1479). In it, he paints his enemy as cruel and an archenemy of science. For centuries it influenced historical opinions until critical research proved otherwise. In other places, party spirit is evident, especially when he treats of the condition of the Church. Notwithstanding, his Lives of the Popes is the first systematic handbook of papal history. Platina felt the need for critical research, but shirked the examination of details. By the end of 1474 or the beginning of 1475, Platina offered his manuscript to Pope Sixtus IV; it is still preserved in the Vatican Library.

On 18 February 1475, the pope appointed Platina as the first Vatican librarian, with a yearly salary of 120 ducats and an official residence in the Vatican. He also instructed him to make a collection of the chief privileges of the Roman Church. This collection, whose value is acknowledged by all the annalists, is still preserved in the Vatican archives. In the preface, Platina not only avoids any antagonism towards the Church but even refers with approbation to the punishing of heretics and schismatics by the popes, which is the best proof that Sixtus IV, by his marks of favour, had won Platina for the interests of the Church. Besides his principal work, Platina wrote several others of smaller importance, notably: Historia inclita urbis Mantuæ et serenissimæ familiæ Gonzagæ. The Pinacoteca Vaticana contains a famous fresco by Melozzo da Forlì representing Sixtus IV Appointing Platina as Prefect of the Vatican Library.

== Halley's comet ==
As a paragraph from Platina's Vitæ Pontificum first gave rise to the legend of the excommunication of Halley's comet by Pope Callixtus III, we here give the legend briefly, after recalling some historical facts. After the fall of Constantinople (1453), Nicolas V appealed in vain to the Christian princes for a crusade. Callixtus III (1455–1458), immediately after his succession, sent legates to the various courts for the same purpose; and, meeting with no response, promulgated a bull on 29 June 1456, prescribing the following:

1. all priests were to say during Mass the oratio contra paganos;
2. daily, between noon and vespers, at the ringing of a bell, everybody had to say three Our Fathers and Hail Marys;
3. processions were to be held by the clergy and the faithful on the first Sunday of each month, and the priests were to preach on faith, patience, and penance; to expose the cruelty of the Turks, and urge all to pray for their deliverance.

On the first Sunday of July (4 July), the first processions were held in Rome. On the same day the Turks began to besiege Belgrade. On 14 July, the Christians gained a small advantage, and on the twenty-first and twenty-second the Turks were put to flight.

In the same year Halley's comet appeared. In Italy it was first seen in June. Towards the end of the month it was still visible for three hours after sunset, causing great excitement everywhere by its extraordinary splendour. It naturally attracted the attention of astrologers, as may appear from the long judicium astrologicum by Avogario, of Ferrara, dated 17 June 1467; it was found again by Celoria among the manuscripts of Paolo Toscanelli, who had copied it himself. The comet was seen till 8 July. It is evident, from all the documents of that time, that it had disappeared from sight several days before the battle of Belgrade. These two simultaneous facts–the publication of the bull and the appearance of the comet–were connected by Platina in the following manner:

Apparente deinde per aliquot dies cometa crinito et rubeo: cum mathematici ingentem pestem: charitatem annonæ: magnam aliquam cladem futuram dicerent: ad avertendam iram Dei Calistus aliquot dierum supplicationes decrevit: ut si quid hominibus immineret, totum id in Thurcos christiani nominis hostes converteret. Mandavit præterea ut assiduo rogatu Deus flecteretur in meridie campanis signum dari fidelibus omnibus: ut orationibus eos juvarent: qui contra Thurcos continuo dimicabant (A maned and fiery comet appearing for several days, while astrologers were predicting a great plague, dearness of food, or some great disaster, Callistus decreed that supplicatory prayers be held for some days to avert the anger of God, so that, if any calamity threatened mankind, it might be entirely diverted against the Turks, the foes of the Christian name. He likewise ordered that the bells be rung at midday as a signal to all the faithful to move God with assiduous petitions and to assist with their prayers those engaged in constant warfare with the Turks).

Platina has, generally speaking, recorded the facts truly; but is wrong at one point, viz., where he says that the astrologers' predictions of great calamities induced the pope to prescribe public prayers. The bull does not contain a word on the comet, as can be verified in the original, authenticated document.

A careful investigation of the authenticated Regesta of Callixtus (about one hundred folios), in the Vatican archives, shows that the comet is not mentioned in any other papal document. Nor do other writers of the time refer to any such prayers against the comet, though many speak both of the comet and of the prayers against the Turks. The silence of St. Antoninus, Archbishop of Florence (1446–1459), is particularly significant. In his Chronicorum libri tres he enumerates accurately all the prayers prescribed by Callixtus; he also mentions the comet of 1456 in a chapter entitled, De cometis, unde causentur et quid significent – but never refers to prayers and processions against the comet, although all papal decrees were sent to him. Aeneas Sylvius and St. John Capistrano, who preached the crusade in Hungary, considered the comet rather as a favourable omen in the war against the Turks.

Hence it is clear that Platina has looked wrongly upon the bull as the outcome of fear of comets. The historians of the 16th and 17th centuries contented themselves with quoting Platina more or less accurately (Calvisius 1605, Spondanus 1641, Lubienietski 1666). Fabre (1726) in his continuation of the Histoire Ecclésiastique by Fleury gave a somewhat free paraphrase. Bruys (1733), an apostate (who afterwards entered the Church again), copies Fleury-Fabre adding que le Pape profita en habile homme de la superstition et de la crédulité des peuples. It is only when we come to Laplace's Exposition du Système du monde, that we find the expression that the pope ordered the comet and the Turks to be exorcized (conjuré), which expression we find again in Daru's poem L'Astronomie. Arago (Des Comètes en général etc. Annuaire du Bureau des Longitudes 1832, 244) converts it into an excommunication. Arago's treatise was soon translated into all the European languages after which time the appearance of the comet (1456) is hardly ever mentioned, but this historical lie must be repeated in various shapes. Smyth (Cycle of celestial objects) speaks of a special protest and excommunication exorcizing the Devil, the Turks, and the comet. Grant (History of physical astronomy) refers to the publication of a bull, in which Callixtus anathematized both the Turks and the comet. Babinet (Revue des deux mondes, 23 ann., vol. 4, 1853, 831) has the pope lancer un timide anathème sur la comète et sur les ennemis de la Chrétienté, whilst in the battle of Belgrade les Frères Mineurs aux premiers rangs, invoquaient l'exorcisme du pape contre la comète. In different ways, the legend is repeated by Chambers, Flammarion, Draper, Jamin, Dickson White, and others.

== Works ==
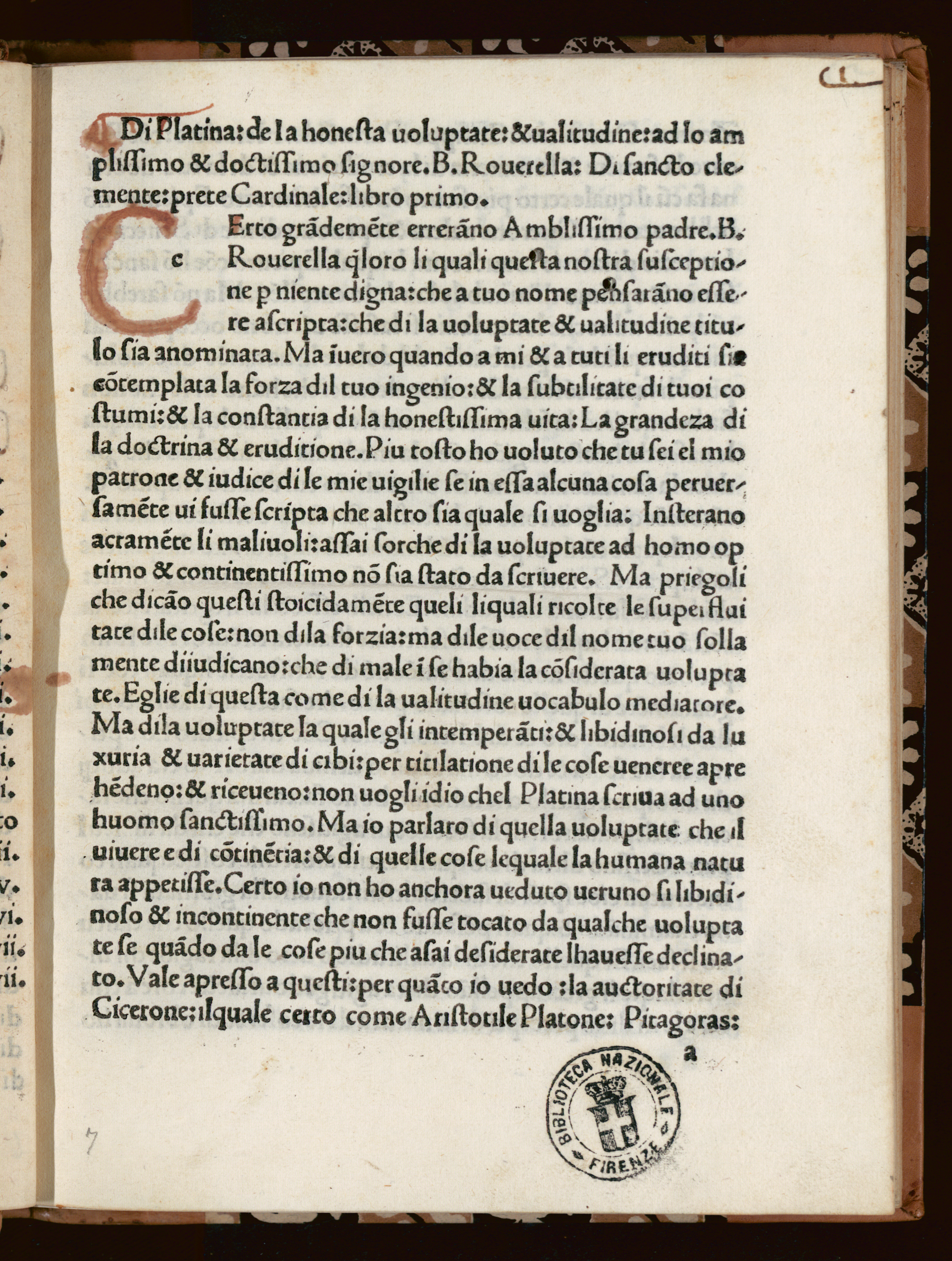
De honesta voluptate et valetudine

=== De honesta voluptate et valetudine ===
In the summer of 1463, Platina was the guest of cardinal Ludovico Trevisan in Albano. There he met Trevisan's chef, the famous Maestro Martino of Como, and the two men became well acquainted. Shortly afterwards, Platina composed De honesta voluptate et valetudine ("On honourable pleasure and health"), a theoretical treatise on Italian cuisine. Large portions of this text were directly copied from Martino's own book of recipes, Libro de arte coquinaria, with credit given by Platina. Platina's work, considered the first printed cookbook, left the press in 1474 and ran into dozens of editions, disseminating Roman ideas about fine dining throughout Western Europe.

=== Other works ===
- Divi Ludovici Marchionis Mantuae somnium (ca. 1454–1456), ed. A. Portioli, Mantua 1887
- Oratio de laudibus illustris ac divi Ludovici Marchionis Mantuae (ca. 1457–1460), in F. Amadei, Cronaca universale della città di Mantova, ed. G. Amadei, E. Marani and G. Praticò, vol. II, Mantua 1955, pp. 226–234
- Vita Nerii Capponi (ca. 1457–1460), in Rerum Italicarum scriptores, vol. XX, Milan 1731, cols 478–516
- Vocabula Bucolicorum, Vocabula Georgicorum (ca. 1460–1461), MS Berlin, Staatsbibliothek, Lat. qu. 488, fols 58r-59v, 59v-65r
- Commentariolus de vita Victorini Feltrensis (ca. 1462–1465), in Il pensiero pedagogico dello Umanesimo, ed. E. Garin, Florence 1958, pp. 668–699
- Epitome ex primo [-XXXVII] C. Plinii Secundi libro De naturali historia (ca. 1462–1466), e.g. MS Siena, Biblioteca comunale, L.III.8, fols 73r-357v
- Oratio de laudibus bonarum artium (ca. 1463–1464), in T. A. Vairani, Cremonensium monumenta Romae extantia, vol. I, Rome 1778, pp. 109–118
- Vita Pii Pontificis Maximi (1464–1465), ed. G.C. Zimolo, in Rerum Italicarum scriptores, 2nd ser., vol. III.3, Bologna 1964, pp. 89–121
- Dialogus de falso ac vero bono, dedicated to Paul II (1464–1465), e.g. Milan, Biblioteca Trivulziana, Mss., 805
- Dialogus de flosculis quibusdam linguae Latinae (ca. 1465–1466), ed. P. A. Filelfo, Milan 1481
- Dialogus contra amores (de amore) (ca. 1465–1472), in Platina, Hystoria de vitis pontificum, Venice 1504, fols B8r-C5r (ed. L. Mitarotondo, doctoral thesis, Università di Messina, 2003)
- De honesta voluptate e valitudine (ca. 1466–1467), ed. E. Carnevale Schianca, Florence 2015
- Historia urbis Mantuae Gonziacaeque familiae (1466–1469), ed. P. Lambeck (1675), reprinted in Rerum Italicarum scriptores, XX, Milan 1731, cols 617–862
- Tractatus de laudibus pacis (1468), in W. Benziger, Zur Theorie von Krieg und Frieden in der italienischen Renaissance, Frankfurt a.M. 1996, part 2, pp. 1–21
- Oratio de pace Italiae confirmanda et bello Thurcis indicendo (1468), ed. Benziger, Zur Theorie, part 2, pp. 95–105
- Panegyricus in laudem amplissimi patris Bessarionis (1470), in Patrologia Graeca, vol. CLXI, 1866, cols CIII-CXVI
- De principe (1470), ed. G. Ferraù, Palermo 1979
- De falso et vero bono, dedicated to Sixtus IV (ca. 1471–1472), ed. M. G. Blasio, Rome 1999
- Liber de vita Christi ac omnium pontificum (ca. 1471–1475), first published Venice 1479; critical edition: G. Gaida, in Rerum Italicarum, scriptores, 2nd ser., vol. III.1, Città di Castello 1913–1932; Latin and English: Lives of the Popes, vol. I, ed. A. F. D’Elia, Cambridge (MA) 2008 (the other volumes are forthcoming); Latin edition of the Life of Paul II: Bartolomeo Platina. Paul II. An Intermediate Reader of Renaissance Latin, ed. Hendrickson et al. Oxford (OH) 2017
- De vera nobilitate (ca. 1472–1477), in Platina, Hystoria de vitis pontificum, Venice 1504, fols C5v-D3v
- De optimo cive (1474), ed. F. Battaglia, Bologna 1944
- A polemical treatise or letter against Battista de’ Giudici (1477); lost, but partly cited in the latter's reply in B. De’ Giudici, Apologia Iudaeorum; Invectiva contra Platinam, ed. D. Quaglioni, Rome 1987, pp. 94–127
- Plutarch, De ira sedanda, translated by Platina (ca. 1477), in Vairani, Cremonensium monumenta, pp. 119–135
- Vita amplissimi patris Ioannis Melini (ca. 1478), ed. M.G. Blasio, Roma 2014
- Liber privilegiorum (ca. 1476–1480), MS Archivio segreto Vaticano, A.A. Arm. I-XVIII, 1288–1290
- Letters: Platinae custodia detenti epistulae (1468–69), ed. Vairani, Cremonensium monumenta, pp. 29–66; critical edition: Lettere, ed. D. Vecchia, Rome 2017
- Book edited by Platina: Josephus, Historiarum libri numero VII, Rome 1475.
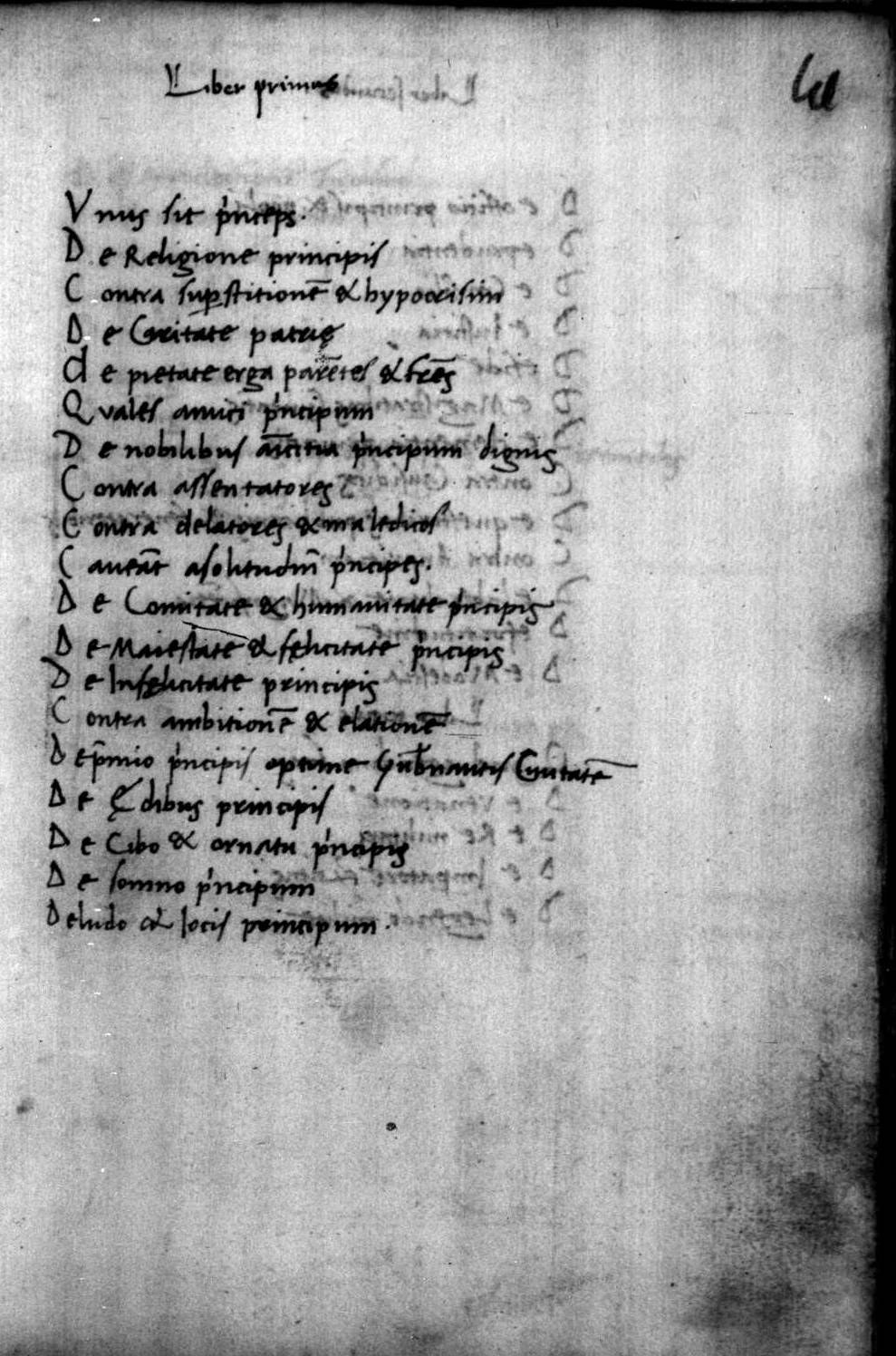
Libri Tres de Principe, 15th-century manuscript. Milan, Biblioteca Ambrosiana, Fondo manoscritti

== Bibliography ==
- Capatti, Alberto; Montanari, Massimo (2003). Italian Cuisine: A Cultural History. Columbia University Press. ISBN 978-0-231-50904-6.
- Platina (2008). Lives of the Popes: Antiquity. Edited and translated by Anthony F. D'Elia. Harvard University Press. ISBN 978-0-674-02819-7.
- Riley, Gillian (1996). "Platina, Martino and their Circle". In Walker, Harlan (ed.). Cooks and Other People. Oxford Symposium. pp. 214–219. ISBN 978-0-907325-72-7.
- Bauer, Stefan (2006). The Censorship and Fortuna of Platina's Lives of the Popes in the Sixteenth Century. Brepols. ISBN 978-2-503-51814-5. Contains a detailed biography and bibliography.
- Bauer, Stefan (2017), "Sacchi, Bartolomeo, detto il Platina", in Dizionario Biografico degli Italiani, 89 (2017), pp. 472-475
