= The Shys =

Indie rock band from Southern California

- Origin: Los Angeles, California
- Genres: Alternative rock, indie rock, garage rock
- Years active: 2004–2010
- Labels: Sire/Warner Bros. Records (2005–2007); Aeronaut Records (2004, 2008)
- Members: Kyle Krone; Chris Wulff; Riley Stephenson
- Past members: Mike Walker; Alex Kweskin; Tony Cupito

The Shys were a five-piece indie rock band from Southern California. Their lineup consisted of Kyle Krone, Chris Wulff, Riley Stephenson, and Ryan Hansen. Their debut CD, Astoria, was released on Sire Records on July 11, 2006. Their most popular song is "Call in the Calvary".

== History ==
=== Formation and EP ===
Kyle Krone and Alex Kweskin knew each other for a long time. In high school, they met Chris Wulff, who played guitar. They played in different high school bands and semi-professional gigs. The trio then decided to form their own band. Originally, they were called "The Gun Shys". In 2004, they opened for The Killers in Las Vegas, and released a six-song EP on Intravenous Records. They became a four-piece band with the addition of Mike Walker. Later on, they were joined by Riley Stephenson and Tony Cupito.

=== Astoria ===
In 2006, The Shys performed at that year's South by Southwest Music Festival, where the Rolling Stone called them "Best Alternative to Jet". They also performed at that year's Street Scene, a musical festival in San Diego. Later that year, they released their debut album Astoria, which featured the singles "Call in the Calvary" and "Waiting on the Sun". The album was met with critical acclaim and a growing, loyal fanbase. However, the album also received negative feedback, with reviews calling it "predictable, unimaginative and lacking originality." "Call in the Calvary" was featured in HBO’s Entourage that year.

=== 2nd EP and 2nd album ===
In 2008, The Shys released a 3-song EP, She's Already Gone. The Shys' album You'll Never Understand This Band the Way That I Do was released on July 22, 2008, on local Echo Park indie label Aeronaut Records. The band announced that it recorded for two days in familiar territory in Los Angeles at Station House Recording Studio (Hollywood Sound) where the band made its past three albums. To finish the record, the band retreated to Palm Desert, California, and used a mobile recording studio borrowed from friends Delta Spirit. NPR described the new album as "gritty rock that is accessible, and thriving on explosive dynamics."

=== Disbandment ===
In 2009, The Shys played at that year's SXSW festival. Around April or May of that year, Krone decided to make his own music. They permanently separated, and there are no plans for future performances as a band or a reunion. All members say they are still good friends, and some still perform and write music with each other regularly.

== Band members ==
=== Final lineup ===
- Kyle Krone (vocals, guitar)
- Chris Wulff (bass)
- Riley Stephenson (keyboards)

=== Former members ===
- Mike Walker (drums, percussion)
- Alex Kweskin (drums, electric piano)
- Tony Cupito (drums)

== Post-Shys ==
In 2011, Krone released three singles. He then released his own album For Those Who Think Young. He then formed another band, Casual Vice before moving away to Costa Rica, which split up that band.

Wulff and Cupito worked alongside acclaimed producer Matt Squire on a project they called "The Get Back Sons". Wulff also did his own project, Collection, alongside Ben Adams. Stephenson is currently working in the financial analyst business with his father, but still plays keys whenever he gets together with his former bandmates. Kweskin toured Europe alongside Robert Francis, and also became an entrepreneur with a hotdog business. Cupito would then join another band, Beware of Darkness.

"Call in the Calvary" continues to be the band's most popular song. The song was used in the 2008 film Prom Night, and most recently, Season 1 of Reacher.
