= Before Nightfall =

Studio album by Robert Francis
- Released: October 9, 2009
- Genre: Rock; country rock; indie folk
- Length: 43:30
- Label: Atlantic
- Producer: Dave Sardy

Robert Francis chronology
| One by One (2007) | Before Nightfall (2009) | Strangers in the First place (2012) |

Singles from Before Nightfall
- 1. "Junebug" Released: January 4, 2010; 2. "Keep on Running" Released: 2010

Before Nightfall is the second studio album by American singer-songwriter Robert Francis, released on October 9, 2009, by Atlantic Records. It was released in 2009 with "Junebug" as lead single, followed by "Keep On Running". Both were also released as video clips. Before Nightfall is Francis' first album on a major label. In an interview with Redefine magazine, Francis said that darkness was a major theme on the album.

== Critical reception ==
Andrew Leahey of AllMusic summarized it as a "grounded, no-frills album, sometimes sweeping in scope." The A.V. Club's Marc Hawthorne found producer Sardy's presence intruding, writing, "he and [Sardy] have given his music a sheen that adds too much distance between performer and listener." Michael Hann at The Guardian felt the album's contents artificial, commenting, "It's a pleasant haze of guitars, bass and drums, sliding by like midwestern plains viewed from a car window [...] but there's little of the sense of sincere connection that lifts the very best American heartland rock out of its homeland and makes it universal."

== Track listing ==
| No. | Title | Length |
|---|---|---|
| 1. | "Darkness" | 2:54 |
| 2. | "Junebug" | 3:58 |
| 3. | "Nightfall" | 3:25 |
| 4. | "Climb a Mountain" | 3:44 |
| 5. | "I Like the Air" | 3:21 |
| 6. | "Keep On Running" | 3:43 |
| 7. | "Mescaline" | 4:06 |
| 8. | "Where You Came From" | 2:53 |
| 9. | "One By One" | 5:18 |
| 10. | "Hallways" | 2:50 |
| 11. | "Playground" | 3:44 |
| 12. | "Do What I Can" | 3:35 |
