= MusiCares Person of the Year =

Annual award presented by MusiCares

- Awarded for: Artistic achievement in the music industry and dedication to philanthropy
- Country: United States
- Presented by: MusiCares
- First award: 1991
- Final award: Ongoing annually
- Website: musicares.org/person-of-the-year

Person of the Year is an annual gala presented by MusiCares, a 501(c)(3) public charity and affiliate of The Recording Academy (the organization that distributes the Grammy Awards), to raise funds for MusiCares’ mission and to honor recording artists for their creative achievements and their dedication to philanthropy. Chosen by the MusiCares Foundation, award recipients are honored during "Grammy Week" (a string of events culminating with the annual Grammy Awards ceremony). Person of the year gala consistes of a seated dinner and start-studded tribute concert.

From 1991 to 1993, the first three MusiCares Person of the Year awards were presented to American musicians David Crosby, Bonnie Raitt, and Natalie Cole. 2018 honorees Fleetwood Mac became the first group to receive the award. Dolly Parton was the first country artist to receive the honor, in 2019. In 2023, Smokey Robinson and Berry Gordy received the award, marking the first time two luminaries were honored in one year. 2025 honoree Jerry Garcia of the Grateful Dead would be the first musician to receive the award posthumously. The award was not presented in 2021 due to the COVID-19 pandemic.

== Recipients ==
Year of ceremony, name of honoree, lifetime, and nationality
Year^{[I]}	Image	Recipient	Lifetime	Nationality	Ref.
1991	A man with a mustache and shoulder-length hair wearing jeans and holding a guitar, standing behind a microphone.	David Crosby	1941–2023	United States	
1992	A woman with red hair wearing black clothing and hoop earrings playing the guitar and singing into a microphone. The American flag appears in the background.	Bonnie Raitt	b. 1949	United States	
1993	A woman wearing earrings, a bracelet and a multi-colored spaghetti strapped dress, with both holds folded over a microphone.	Natalie Cole	1950–2015	United States	
1994	The side view of a woman with her eyes closed, singing into a microphone and playing a black guitar.	Gloria Estefan	b. 1957	Cuba; United States	
1995	An older man holding a microphone in one hand, his arms held out, smiling and wearing a black suit with a white dress shirt.	Tony Bennett	1926–2023	United States	
1996	An older man with a white mustache, wearing a black tie, red dress shirt, gray jacket, and a name badge that hangs from a string around his neck.	Quincy Jones	1933–2024	United States	
1997	A man with a shaved head wearing black and singing into a microphone. The background contains dotted lighting on a stage.	Phil Collins	b. 1951	United Kingdom	
1998	A man in a dress coat and white shirt with an open mouth, which is framed by dark facial hair.	Luciano Pavarotti	1935–2007	Italy	
1999	A man smiling, wearing black sunglasses and colorful clothing, behind a microphone.	Stevie Wonder	b. 1950	United States	
2000		Elton John	b. 1947	United Kingdom	
2001	A man behind a microphone holding an acoustic guitar and wearing a yellow shirt and black hat.	Paul Simon	b. 1941	United States	
2002	A man with a goatee and his eyes closed behind a microphone on a piano, wearing a black shirt and striped jacket.	Billy Joel	b. 1949	United States	
2003	A man with facial hair wearing a leather jacket, a black shirt, an earring, and tinted glasses with a star along the frame.	Bono	b. 1960	Ireland	
2004	A man with a v-neck, white T-shirt wearing a necklace and bracelet standing behind a microphone, holding a guitar.	Sting	b. 1951	United Kingdom	
2005		Brian Wilson	1942–2025	United States	
2006	A man behind a microphone holding an acoustic guitar, sitting on a stool in the center of a stage, with a light shining down from above. To his sides are an electric guitar on a stand, a side table with a laptop, a bottle, and some additional equipment.	James Taylor	b. 1948	United States	
2007	A man wearing a black tie and white dress shirt with an electric guitar hanging from a strap around his neck. His left arm is raised, with his index finger pointed upwards. In the background is a drum set.	Don Henley	b. 1947	United States	
2008	A woman her mouth open, holding a microphone. She is wearing a gray hat with a large bow, gray gloves, and a gray jacket. In the background is a crowd of people.	Aretha Franklin	1942–2018	United States	
2009	A man behind a microphone holding a black guitar, wearing a black dress shirt with embellishments.	Neil Diamond	b. 1941	United States	
2010	Black and white image of an older man with sideburns wearing a white dress shirt with his sleeves rolled up, holding a guitar.	Neil Young	b. 1945	Canada	
2011	A woman with blond hair, wearing a white dress and jeweled necklace.	Barbra Streisand	b. 1942	United States	
2012	Paul McCartney Performs in Dublin.	Paul McCartney	b. 1942	United Kingdom	
2013	Bruce Springsteen Performs in Spain.	Bruce Springsteen	b. 1949	United States	
2014	Carole King.	Carole King	b. 1942	United States	
2015		Bob Dylan	b. 1941	United States	
2016		Lionel Richie	b. 1949	United States	
2017		Tom Petty	1950–2017	United States	
2018		Fleetwood Mac: Mick Fleetwood John McVie Christine McVie Lindsey Buckingham Stevie Nicks	b. 1947 b. 1945; 1943–2022 b. 1949 b. 1948	United States; United Kingdom	
2019		Dolly Parton	1946–2026	United States	
2020		Aerosmith: Joe Perry Steven Tyler Tom Hamilton Joey Kramer Brad Whitford	b. 1950 b. 1948 b. 1951 b. 1950 b. 1952	United States	
2022		Joni Mitchell	b. 1943	Canada	
2023		Berry Gordy & Smokey Robinson	b. 1929 b. 1940	United States	
2024		Jon Bon Jovi	b. 1962	United States	
2025		Grateful Dead: Jerry Garcia Bob Weir Phil Lesh Bill Kreutzmann Mickey Hart	1942–1995; 1947–2026; 1940–2024 b. 1946 b. 1943	United States	
2026		Mariah Carey	b. 1969	United States	
2027		U2: Bono The Edge Adam Clayton Larry Mullen Jr.	b. 1960 b. 1961 b. 1960 b. 1961	Ireland	

^{^[I]} Each year is linked to an article about the Annual Grammy Awards ceremony of that year.

== See also ==
- MusiCares
- Latin Recording Academy Person of the Year
