= Sixtus IV Appointing Platina as Prefect of the Vatican Library =

Fresco by Melozzo da Forlì

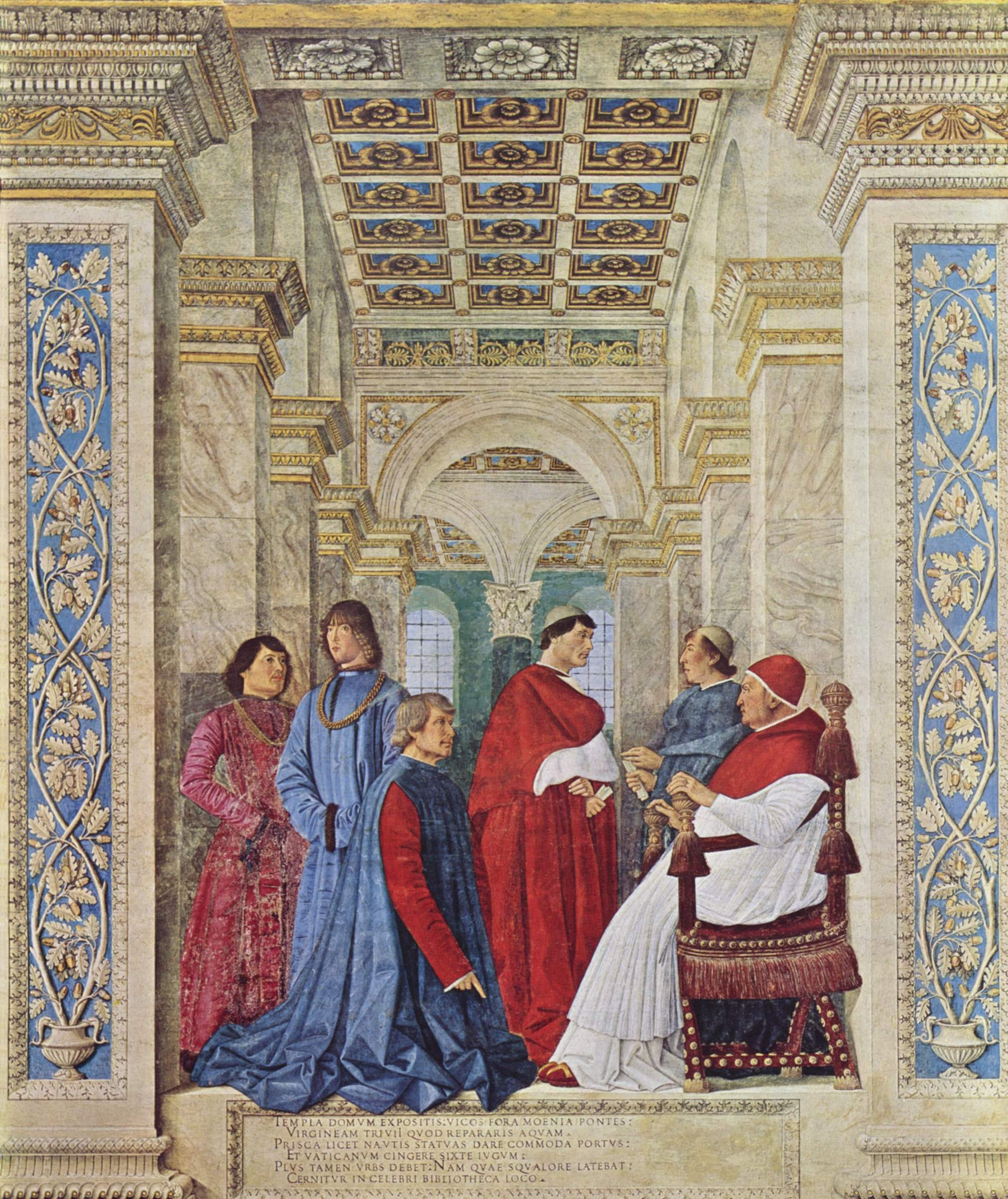
- Artist: Melozzo da Forlì
- Year: 1477
- Type: Fresco transferred to canvas
- Dimensions: 370 cm × 315 cm (150 in × 124 in)
- Location: Pinacoteca Vaticana; Vatican City

Sixtus IV Appointing Platina as Prefect of the Vatican Library is a fresco transferred to canvas by the Italian Renaissance artist Melozzo da Forlì, once decorating the Vatican Library, now housed in the Pinacoteca Vaticana in Rome.

The fresco was executed in 1477 as the central scene of the decoration of the Vatican Library, founded by Sixtus IV two years before, including works by Antoniazzo Romano and the brothers Davide and Domenico Ghirlandaio.

The scene shows the Pope, seen slightly from below, faced by the kneeling humanist Bartolomeo Platina, together with the Pope's nephews: the two cardinals, Giuliano della Rovere, standing in front of the Pope, and Raffaele Riario behind his chair. To the left are Girolamo Riario and Giuliano's brother Giovanni della Rovere on the left. Giuliano della Rovere was later to become Pope Julius II.

The background is a perspective representation of a classic architecture with arcades and a gilded coffer ceiling. Platina is pointing to an inscription, written by himself, which boasts Sixtus' deeds.

== Sources ==
- Zuffi, Stefano (2004). Il Quattrocento. Milan: Electa. 8837023154.
