= Robert Francis (musician) =

American musician (born 1987)

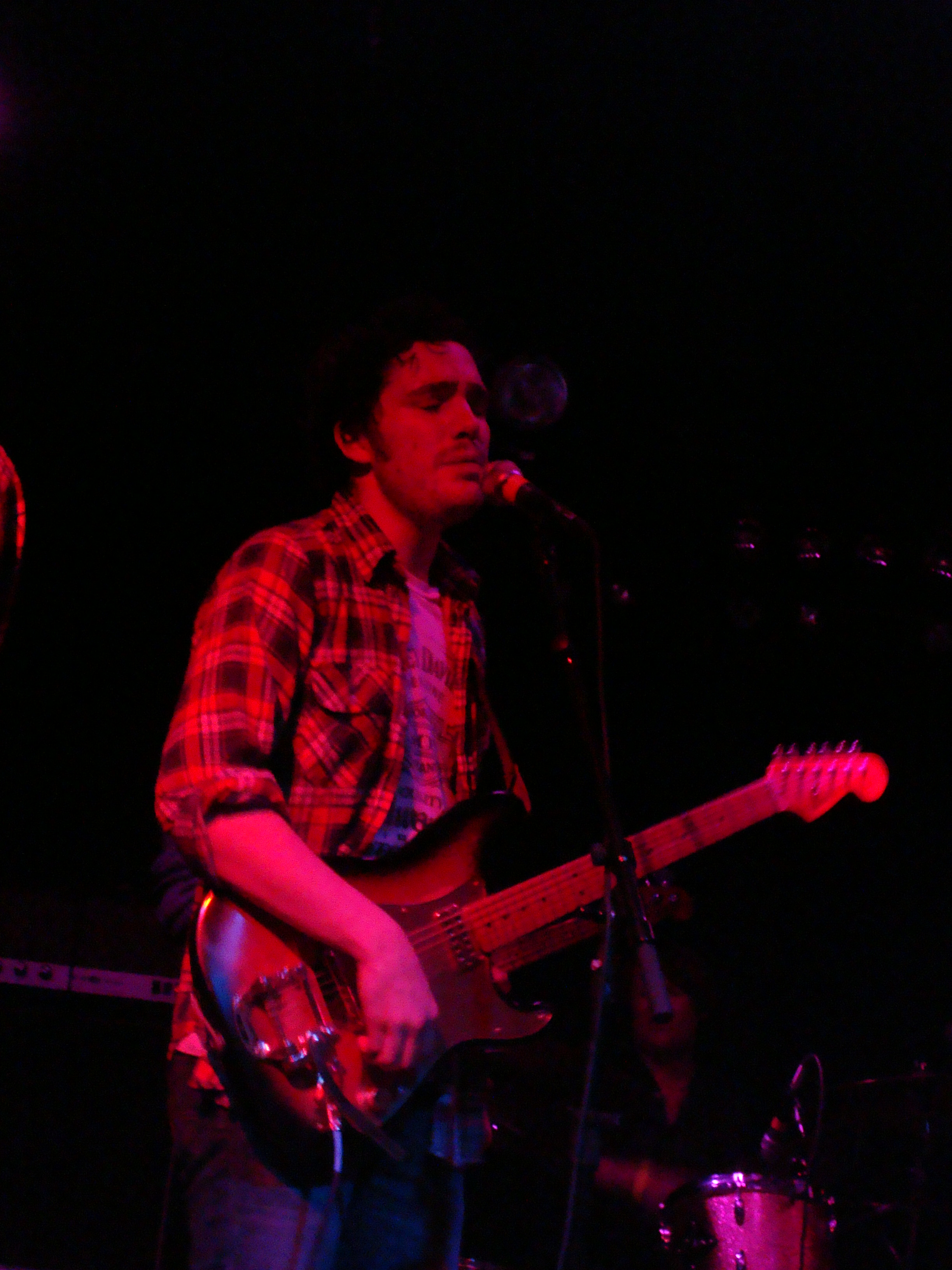
- Robert Francis in 2009

Background information
- Born: Robert Anthony Commagere; September 25, 1987 (age 39)
- Origin: Los Angeles, U.S.
- Genres: Folk, Indie, Americana
- Occupations: Singer-songwriter, musician
- Years active: 2007–present
- Labels: Atlantic Records, Aeronaut Records, Vanguard Records
- Website: robertfrancismusic.com

Robert Francis (born Robert Anthony Commagere; September 25, 1987, in Los Angeles, California) is a multi-instrumentalist, Americana singer-songwriter. His debut full-length album, One By One, was released in August 2007 by Aeronaut Records, gaining him notice for its "emotional darkness and musicality". His sound is distinguished by his "bright, gravelly baritone", often conveying the emotion of a more "hardened performer". He is best known for the song "Junebug", which was a top ten airplay hit in Europe in 2010.

== One By One (2007) ==
At nineteen years old, Francis "separated himself from his friends and society to write his debut record, One By One." The album took over a year to make with Francis' [learning] "how to engineer over that period of time." Half of the album was recorded in his childhood home while the rest was recorded at his friend's parents' house while they were out of town. "Songs like Dakota and One By One were recorded there." The album received three and a half stars on the All Music Guide.

In 2008 Francis' supported Australian singer/songwriter Missy Higgins on a national tour.

On March 5, 2009, Carson Daly aired a half-hour feature on the singer/songwriter where he performed One By One, Do What I Can and Junebug.

Robert Francis' One By One was nominated for the prestigious Shortlist Music Prize in 2007.

Francis' song, "All of My Trains," from his album One By One appeared in the 2009 film, The Vicious Kind.

Two of his songs, "Dakota" and "All of My Trains", were used in the 2012 film Deadfall.

== Before Nightfall (2009) ==
In 2009, Francis' signed with Atlantic Records and recorded his sophomore album Before Nightfall. The record was produced by "hardcore super-producer" Dave Sardy and released in the fall of that year. The song Junebug was released as a Free Single on iTunes during the week of the album's release.

In 2010, Junebug reached #1 on French Radio and was featured on the NRJ Summer Hits Only Compilation. Junebug also reached a peak position of #22 in Switzerland and #26 in Germany and #25 in Portugal.
In 2010 Francis' performed his song Junebug and a cover of The Rolling Stones, Wild Horses on the French television show Taratata. He returned to the show again later that year to perform a duet with The John Butler Trio where they covered The Beatles' Across The Universe. He also performed his song Nightfall with Manu Katche on the French television show One Shot Not that same year.
On August 10, 2010, Francis performed Junebug on The Tonight Show with Jay Leno. In 2010 Francis' was invited to perform at the 25th Annual Farm Aid in Milwaukee, WI. In the winter of 2010 Francis' performed a sold-out tour of Europe.

== Strangers in the First Place (2012) ==
It was announced that Francis would release his third album, and first with Vanguard Records, Strangers in the First Place, on May 22, 2012. The album was recorded in Malibu, California, at the "Eagle's Watch" House designed by famed architect Harry Gesner.

He performed Perfectly Yours on The Tonight Show with Jay Leno on July 19, 2012.

Francis was invited to Bob Weir's TRI Studios to play songs off Strangers In The First Place with Yahoo Music describing the performance as "endless nostalgia and nuance in each note."

== Heaven (2014) ==
Francis' fourth studio album, "Heaven", was released on Aeronaut Records on June 3, 2014.

The song "Baby Was the Devil" was used in the fifth episode of season 5 of the series Shameless.

== Fire Engine Red (2016) ==
In early 2015, Robert Francis set out to record a new album, entitled "Empire Blues". The project was subsequently abandoned, however. Following a series of recordings in various Los Angeles studios, a period of time leaving Francis feeling uninspired, he relocated to León, Mexico. Recording there resulted in what would become Francis' sixth studio album, "Fire Engine Red", which was released on May 13, 2016.

== Indian Summer (2017) ==
On November 28, 2016, Francis announced that he was returning to work on Empire Blues, which he had begun working on before Fire Engine Red. Again, however, the recording sessions for Empire Blues were set aside. On November 3, 2017, Francis released Indian Summer via Aeronaut Records.

== Amaretto & The End Times, Vol. 1 (2020) ==
On May 1, 2020, Robert Francis released his eighth studio album, Amaretto. Barely two months later, on June 19, he released a followup to Amaretto, The End Times, Vol. 1.

== Discography ==
| Year | Title | Peak chart positions | | | | | | | |
| Year | Title | FRA | BEL (WA) | SWI | GER | AUT | POR | UK | US |
|---|---|---|---|---|---|---|---|---|---|
| 2007 | One By One | — | — | — | — | — | 5 | — | — |
| 2009 | Before Nightfall | 26 | 74 | 47 | 17 | 43 | 31 | — | — |
| 2012 | Strangers in the First Place | 115 | — | — | — | — | — | — | — |
| 2014 | Heaven | — | — | — | — | — | — | — | — |
| 2015 | Valentine | — | — | — | — | — | — | — | — |
| 2016 | Fire Engine Red | — | — | — | — | — | — | — | — |
| 2017 | Indian Summer | — | — | — | — | — | — | — | — |
| 2020 | Amaretto | — | — | — | — | — | — | — | — |
