= Bill Silva Entertainment =

Concert promotion, artist management, touring, and publishing company

Bill Silva Entertainment is a concert promotion, artist management, touring, and publishing company based in Los Angeles and established in 1979.

BSE has represented artists such as Jason Mraz, blink-182, Unwritten Law, James Morrison, and Christina Perri, and has produced more than 10,000 shows. Bill Silva, the company's founder, has won three Independent Promoter of the Year awards.

The company is a partner in DT Model Management and The Uprising Creative.

== History ==
=== Early Years: San Diego ===
While Bill Silva was a student at University of California, San Diego he started a concert promotion company. His partner was a fellow student, Mike Fahn, who attended San Diego State University. They started promoting concerts in 1979 as Fahn & Silva Presents and soon supplanted Marc Berman as the leading San Diego concert promoter "by hooking up with new-wave artists such as Blondie and the Police," according to the San Diego Reader. Over the next few years the company brought acts such as The Who, Simon & Garfunkel, Devo, The Police, Pat Benatar, INXS, Diana Ross, and Willie Nelson to the area.

After splitting from Fahn, Silva branched out into other parts of the southwest, promoting smaller shows in Arizona, Texas, Nevada, and Idaho. In 1982 he partnered with Feyline Productions and became the promoter for Feyline's shows outside of Colorado.

In 1992 Silva teamed up with Andrew Hewitt to obtain exclusive rights to produce rock concerts at the Hollywood Bowl.

In 1993 Silva started representing the band Unwritten Law after promoting one of their shows and BSE's management division, Bill Silva Management, was founded. Soon after, BSM added Blink-182 to its artist roster.

=== The Move to Los Angeles and the Start of the Jason Mraz Era ===
Bill Silva Entertainment moved from San Diego to Los Angeles in 1999. He was introduced to Jason Mraz, who he managed until 2017.

Silva also sold his concert division, Bill Silva Presents, to Universal Studios's concert division, which was later purchased by House of Blues Concerts. In March 2003 Andrew Hewitt and Silva left that venture, parting ways in concert promotion with the exception of their partnership at the Hollywood Bowl.

Silva went on to re-establish Bill Silva Presents with a touring division that was kicked off by 2000's "Up In Smoke Tour" with Dr. Dre, Snoop Dogg, and Eminem. In 2005 Silva hired Eric Herz, a former executive at Avalon Attractions and Metropolitan Entertainment, to oversee Bill Silva Presents.

=== Recent Years: Expansion and Diversification ===
In 2011 Silva merged Bill Silva Presents with Live Nation Entertainment, placing Silva and Andrew Hewitt in charge of overseeing the company's concerts in the southwest region of the United States.

In 2012 the Bill Silva Entertainment team formed a partnership with the model manager David Todd to form DT Model Management.

== Bill Silva Management ==
Bill Silva Management has managed the careers of artists, comedians, and film directors since its founding in 1993.

The company began with San Diego bands Unwritten Law and blink-182, and managed Jason Mraz from 1999 to 2017.

Until 2008 Silva also managed and promoted tours for comedian Margaret Cho.

In 2010 BSM client Christina Perri's demo "Jar of Hearts" was featured on FOX's So You Think You Can Dance, and was successful on the Billboard, iTunes, and Amazon charts.

The company currently represents Molly Kate Kestner, Brooke Candy, Dreezy, Kittens, XO-IQ.

== Silva Music Publishing ==
The publishing division of BSE began as a service for its management clients, primarily dealing with BSM artists and their collaborators. In 2012 the company brought in Peter Coquillard, a music publisher who previously worked with Windswept Pacific, L.A. Reid, HITCO, and Network One Music Publishing, to expand the publishing division to include songwriters unaffiliated with BSM.

Silva Music Publishing consists of three publishing entities: Silva Tone Music (ASCAP), BS Management Music (BMI), and Silva Lining Music (SESAC).

Silva Tone consists of:

- Ainslie Henderson, who wrote "Clockwatching" with Jason Mraz
- Michael Natter, who wrote "I Won't Give Up" with Jason Mraz
- Stephen "Shebby" Ruchelman, who wrote for Hollywood Undead and Neon Trees including the track "Some Kind of Monster," which was featured on the Iron Man 3 soundtrack.
- Tiffany Vartanyan, who has written with Ryan Tedder of One Republic and Demi Lovato

BS Management Music publishes for:

- John Hogan of Unwritten Law
- John Anderson, who wrote and performed with Christine Perri
- David Pack of Ambrosia

Silva Lining Music currently publishes exclusively for Jeremy Thurber, a pop artist who has collaborated with Jake Miller and Karl Wolf.
