= Les Sans Culottes =

French-language rock band

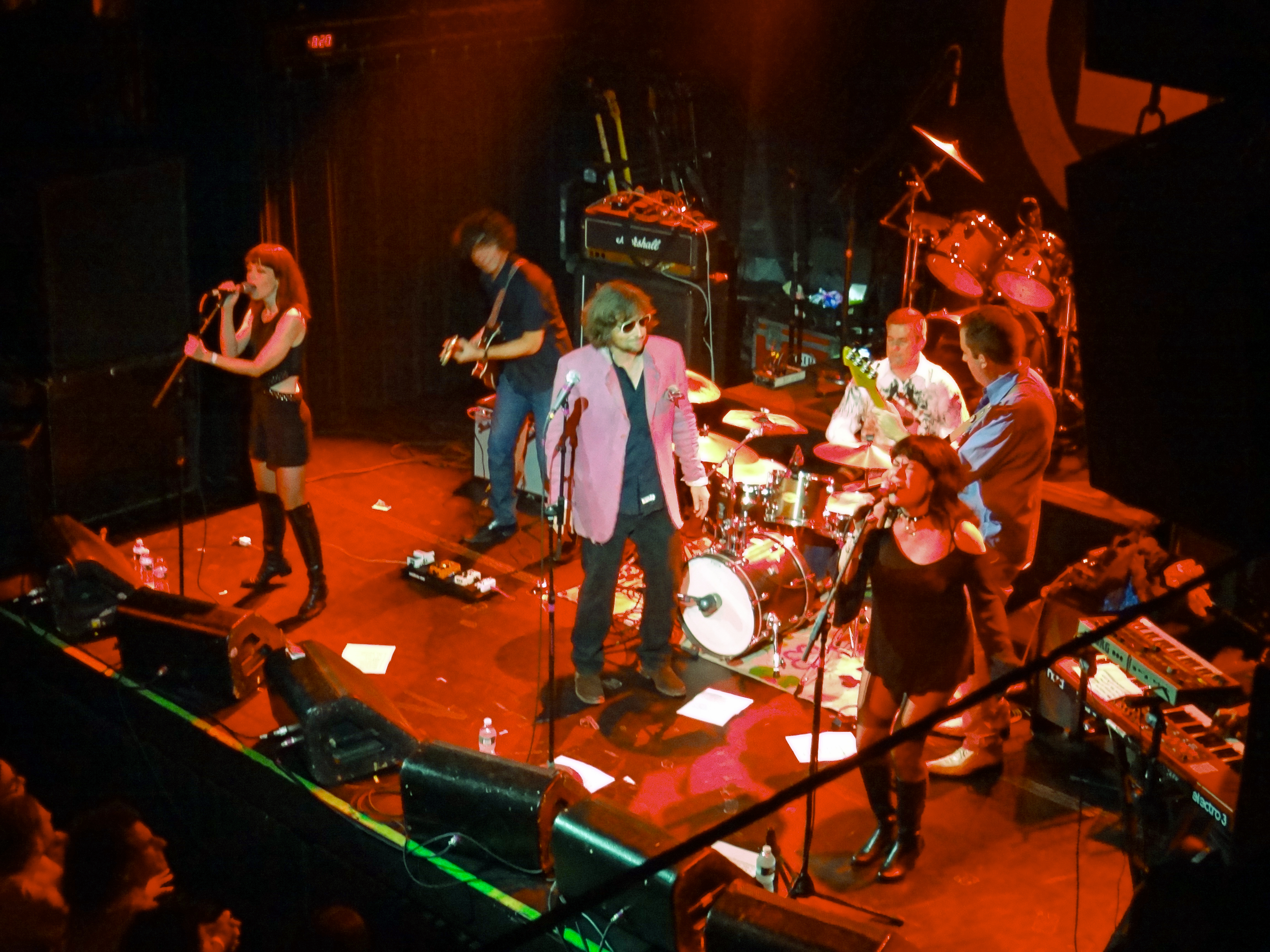
- Les Sans Culottes at Irving Plaza; New York City, September 8, 2015

Background information
- Origin: Brooklyn, New York
- Genres: French rock Garage rock Ye-Ye; Indie rock
- Years active: 1998–Present
- Labels: Vibratone Records; Escargot-Go; Aeronaut Records; Digital Club Network
- Members: Clermont Ferrand : vocals Kit Kat le Noir : vocals Brigitte Bordeaux : vocals Jean L'Effete : guitar Benoit Bals : keyboards M. Pomme-Frite : bass guitar Jacques Strappe : drums
- Past members: Gigi Soleil; Albert Camembert; Jean Luc Ritard; Beau Pantalons; Luc Panatalons - a.k.a. Le Marquis! Celine Dijon; M'Arc de Triomphe; Max Gauche; Francoise Hardly - a.k.a. Jeanaté; Gilles Pamplemousse; Lola La Chaise; Malcolm Smart; Ali La Pointe; Axl Rouge; Pascal Blase - a.k.a. Horace de Bussy; Jean Paul Georges-Ringo; Jacques Sheer-Rock; Cal D'Hommage; Maurice Chevrolet; Roget Bontemps; Geddy Liaison; Pierrot Le Fou; Joe Camus; Anouk Ennui; Harry Covert; Theo Neugent; Sid Vichyssoise; Johnny Dieppe; Courtney Louvre
- Website: Official website

Les Sans Culottes is a French-language rock band from Brooklyn, New York. The group performs primarily original material and some covers of French rock songs and French-language reworkings of some classic American rock songs. Their name is a reference to the citizen soldiers of the French Revolution and also the more contemporary slang term for "no underpants."

== History ==
The band was formed in 1998 by Detroit native and Brooklyn transplant, Bill Carney, dubbed Clermont Ferrand after the industrial city in central France. Carney had travelled to France and developed a deep interest in French pop and yé-yé music of the 1960s, particularly artists such as Serge Gainsbourg, Françoise Hardy, France Gall, Jacques Dutronc and Nino Ferrer. The band made its debut in April 1998, at Freddy's Back Room, a neighborhood bar in Prospect Heights, Brooklyn. The original lineup was singer-frontman Ferrand, vocalists Kit Kat Le Noir and Gigi Soleil, drummer Albert Camembert, bassist Jean Luc Retard, keyboardist Beau Pantalons, and guitarist Luc Panatalons - a.k.a. Le Marquis!. The band has had several line-up changes over its more than 23-year history while maintaining original vocalists Ferrand and Kit Kat Le Noir. Its current line-up consists of vocalists Clermont Ferrand, Kit Kat Le Noir and Brigitte Bourdeaux, along with drummer Jacques Strappe, guitarist, Jean L'Effete, bassist, M. Pomme-Frite, and keyboard player, Benoit Bals.

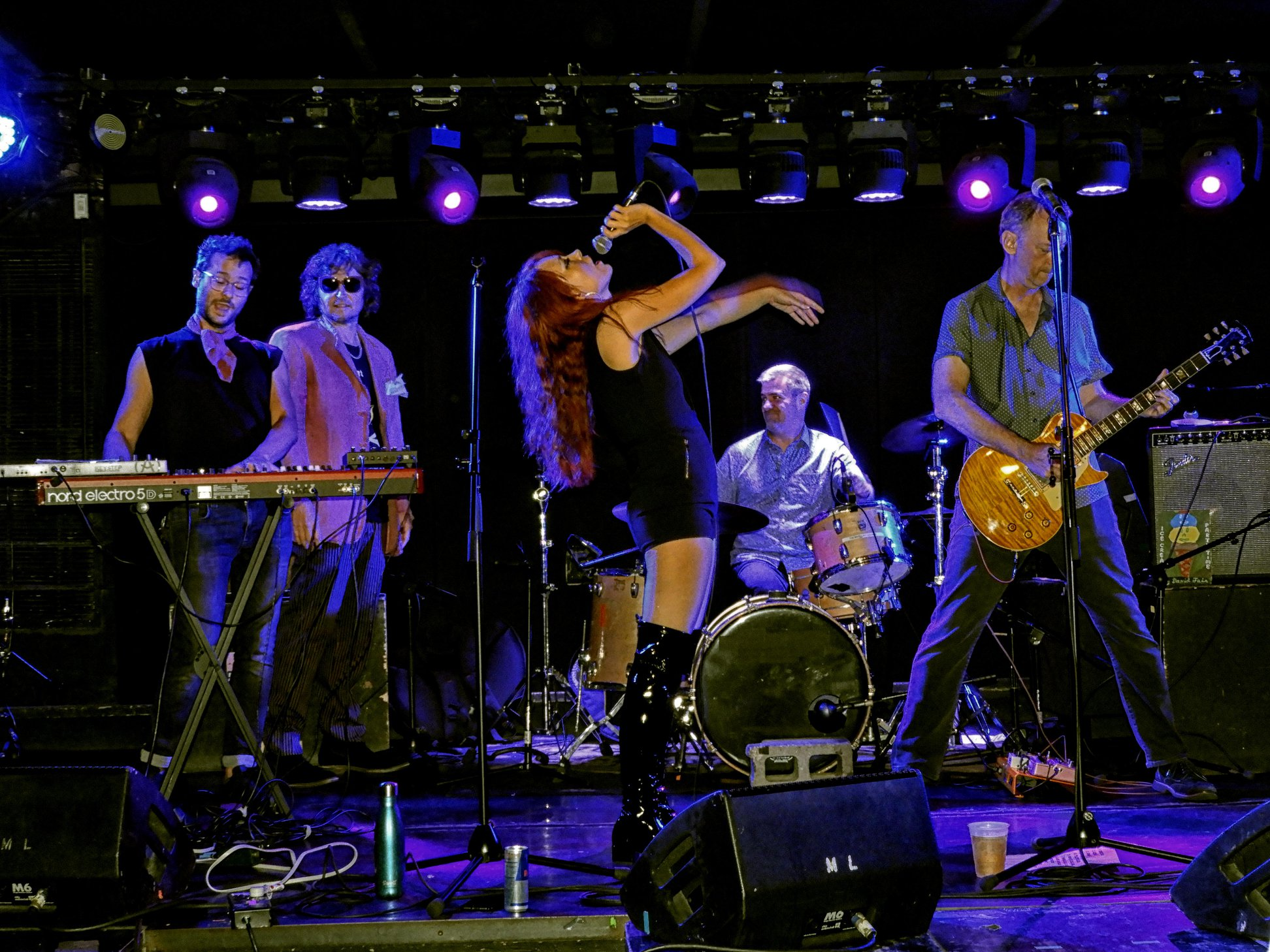
Les Sans Culottes, 2018

In 2005, the band's guitarist and drummer attempted to start another French language band with some former members and others and to call themselves "Les Sans Culottes". The original group brought a trademark infringement claim in Federal Court in Manhattan which resulted in a court order barring the new group from using the name of the original group. In 2013, Les Sans Culottes singer, Clermont Ferrand, recounted the legal battle surrounding the Les Sans Culottes band name.

In July 2009 the band played its first ever shows in France, performing at La Feline and L'Opa Bastille in Paris and at the 18th annual Festival des Musiques d'ici et d'ailleurs in Châlons-en-Champagne. The group has also toured nationally across the United States and in Canada.

Their music has been featured in numerous ads, on television programs and movies, including for Hewlett-Packard digital cameras, Google Nexus S smartphone, HBO's Cathouse, Working Girls in Bed, and Entourage programs, FX's The Strain, MTV'S The Real World and Surf Girls and The CW's Gossip Girl as well as the movies The Hot Chick and Dalton Calhoun.

The band released its ninth album, She Is Tossed By the Waves But Doesn't Sink, in April, 2018.

== Discography ==
- Les Sans Culottes (1999, Escargot-Go Records)
- The Ennui and the Ecstasy (2001, Escargot-Go Records)
- Faux Realism (2002, Aeronaut)
- Full Frontal Crudité- Live in Paris (2003, Digital Club Network)
- Fixation Orale (2004, Aeronaut)
- Le Weekender (2007, Vibratone Records)
- 'Pataphysical Graffiti (2012, Vibratone Records)
- The Gods Have Thirst (2014, Disques Escargot-Go)
- She Is Tossed By the Waves But Doesn't Sink (2018, Disques Escargot-Go)
