= Eel pie =

Food made with eels

Eel pies have been eaten since at least the 13th or 14th centuries. In medieval Britain, eel pies were often eaten around fasting periods of the liturgical calendar and were sometimes used to pay rent. The crust was not necessarily eaten; in some pies it served as a vessel, with the eel filling scooped out and served on bread. Consumption was not restricted to Britain, with records of eel pies being sold and eaten on the streets of 15th-century France and served at a wedding banquet in 14th-century Milan.

Eel pies continued to be eaten in Britain after the medieval period. As they did, tastes changed, and by the 18th century the eel pie had transitioned from a heavily spiced dish to lighter preparations. Sold by hawkers in London by the 16th century, the pies were associated with the city's Cockney population, an association referenced by Shakespeare in King Lear. Shops dedicated to eel pies emerged in the 18th century, with the best pies reputed to come from Eel Pie House on Eel Pie Island in the Thames. Hawkers continued to sell eel pies on the streets of London until food shortages of World War I contributed to their decline. By the 21st century, eel pies had essentially disappeared from England.

== History ==
=== Middle Ages ===
Eels have been consumed in Britain since at least the eighth century, and in standing pies since at least the thirteenth or fourteenth centuries. An early recipe for eel pie is produced in the Anglo-Norman manuscript Additional 32085 (1272–1307) under the name "Teste de Turke", or, "Turks' Head":

How to make the dish called Turk's head for a fish day or in Lent. Take choice rice and wash it and dry it; then grind it thoroughly, mix with thickened almond milk, and put in spices and saffron, as directed below, and sugar. Make a pastry case; then scald eels and remove the excrement; then cut them up; and take parsley, sage, and some broth, and grind in a mortar, and put in saffron and mixed ground spice; then cover [with a pastry lid] and put it in the oven, etc. (Note: A fere meymes cele viaunde perjur de pesson ou en kareme ke l'em apele teste de Turke. Pernez rys triez e festes les laver, e sechir, e pus le braez bien; e pus festes temprer oue let des alemaundes espesse, e metez dedenz especes e seffran, si cum avant est dist, e sucre. Festes un cofin de past, e pus festes escauder des anguilles, e festes oster les fimys, e pus festes goboner; e pernez persil e sauge e del bro, e festes braer en un morter, e metez seffran e pudre; e pus coverez le, e metez en furn, &cetera.)

Another early recipe was included in The Forme of Cury, circa 1390. Consumption was concentrated around times in the liturgical calendar that required fasting. In some of these pies, the crusts functioned simply as a vessel for holding the interior, as in one 15th century recipe, which instructed the pie be served by spooning out the filling onto pieces of bread. That filling consisted of the eels in a sauce, flavoured with dried fruits, wine, and spices. The oily flesh of the eel was believed to be particularly suitable for pies, and was sometimes added to fish pies when white fish were considered not fatty enough. At times in the Middle Ages, eel pies were used to pay rent.

Eel pies were not only eaten in Britain. By the early 1400s in Paris, small eel pies could be purchased on the street from hawkers. In Milan, eel pies were served at the 1368 wedding of Violante Visconti to Lionel of Antwerp, Duke of Clarence, alongside "Beef pies with cheese" as the 8th course in a 17-course dinner. In the 15th century, Bartolomeo Platina gives a recipe for Torta ex Angvillis in De honesta voluptate et valetudine, that he had sourced from the contemporary chef Martino da Como. Como's pie formed its filling with pieces of a boiled and skinned eel, rosewater, almond milk, verjuice, raisins and figs as optional thickeners, parsley and saltbush fried in oil, spices, pine nuts and sugar. The recipe closes with the words: "when it is finally cooked, serve to your enemies, for it has nothing good in it." (Note: Coctā demū hostibus appones. Nil enim boni in se habet.) (Note: This mixed messaging was a product of De honesta voluptate being at once a cookery treatise and a medical manual, purposes which sometimes came into conflict.) A record of a 1531 banquet prepared in Italy by the cook Cristoforo di Messisbugo to celebrate the Nativity of Mary has eel pie served as a first course, alongside dishes such as stuffed eggs and figs.

=== Later history ===
In the 17th century, recipes for eel pies appeared in an edition of Gervase Markham's The English Huswife and in Hannah Woolley's The Queen-Like Closet (1670). As was typical for the time, Woolley's recipe for "Pie with Eels and Oisters" was heavily spiced. Such seasonings continued until the 18th century, when simpler, less intensely spiced preparations emerged. One of these newer eel pies appeared in 1747 in The Art of Cookery Made Plain and Easy by Hannah Glasse. In North America, Anne Gibbons Gardiner included a recipe in her 1763 receipts book. Gardiner's pie was spiced with mace, salt and pepper, and was contained in an edible crust. Eel pies were a common part of the cuisine of New England, and were still made often in the region by the mid-19th century.

In London from the 16th century, eel pies could be purchased on the street, cooked on-site in small ovens. In the city, eels have long been popular among the Cockney population of London, and references to the association have appeared in literature since at least the 1600s. Shakespeare makes a reference in King Lear, describing a Cockney making an eel pie who put eels "in the paste alive", and Angela Carter uses eel pies in her 1991 novel Wise Children to code her characters as Cockney.

Shops dedicated to eel pies emerged in London in the middle of the 18th century. Among these, those reputed as making the best eel pies included the Eel Pie House on an island in the Thames in Twickenham, and the Eel Pie House on New River, Highbury. In the East End, eel pies continued to be eaten in the 19th century, alongside other eel dishes such as jellied eels. This version of eel pie could contain herbs, lemon juice and a shortcrust pastry top, which contrasted with an eel pie eaten in Cornwall that contained raisins and a suet pastry top. The island in Twickenham specialized in the pies and became known as Eel Pie Island, offering boating parties and picnickers pies hot or cold. The island's popularity peaked in the middle of the century, at a time when it was referenced by the celebrity chef William Kitchiner in his recipe for "An Eel Pie Worthy of Eel-Pie Island". Large numbers of hawkers sold eel pies on the streets of London until after World War I, when food shortages affected the city.

By the 21st century, eel pies were essentially extinct in England, even as references survived in the names of "Eel, Pie and Mash" shops.

== See also ==
- Eel as food
- Eel Pie Studios
- Lamprey pie
- List of pies, tarts and flans

== Sources ==
- Albala, Ken (Spring 2002). "On Right Pleasure and Good Health: A Critical Edition and Translation of De honesta voluptate et valetudine, edited and translated by Mary Ella Milham and Libellus de arte coquinaria: An Early Northern Cookery Book, edited and translated by Rudolph Grewe and Constance B. Heiatt". Gastronomica. 2 (2). doi:10.1525/gfc.2002.2.2.103.
- Boyd, Lizzie (1988). British Cookery (2nd ed.). Bromley, Kent: Christopher Helm Publishers. ISBN 0-7470-0223-1.
- Cowan, Brian (2007). "New Worlds, New Tastes: Food Fashions after the Renaissance". In Freedman, Paul (ed.). Food: The History of Taste. London: Thames & Hudson. ISBN 978-0-500-29537-3.
- Grigson, Jane (1994) [1973]. Jane Grigson's Fish Book. London: Penguin Books. ISBN 0-14-046929-X.
- Hieatt, Constance B; Jones, Robin F (Oct 1986). "Two Anglo-Norman Culinary Collections Edited from British Library Manuscripts Additional 32085 and Royal 12.C.xii". Speculum. 61 (4). JSTOR 2853971.
- Hope, Annette (2005). Londoners' Larder: English Cuisine from Chaucer to the Present. Edinburgh: Mainstream Publishing. ISBN 1-84018-965-7.
- Jotischky, Andrew (2011). A Hermit's Cookbook: Monks, Food and Fasting in the Middle Ages. London & New York: Continuum International Publishing Group. ISBN 978-0-8264-2393-1.
- Klemettilä, Hannele (2012). The Medieval Kitchen: A Social History with Recipes. London: Reaktion Books. ISBN 978-1-86189-908-8.
- Mason, Laura; Brown, Catherine (2007). Bedfordshire Clangers and Lardy Cake: Traditional Foods from the South East. London: Harper Press. ISBN 978-0-00-779-843-8.
- Parasecoli, Fabio (2014). Al Dente: A History of Food in Italy. London: Reaktion Books. ISBN 978-1-78023-276-8.
- Platina, Bartolomeo (1475). De honesta voluptate et valetudine (in Latin). Venice: Laurentius de Aquila and Sibylinus Umber.
- Platina, Bartolomeo (1999) [1475]. De honesta voluptate et valetudine [On Right Pleasure and Good Health]. Translated by Milham, Mary Ella. Asheville, North Carolina: Pegasus Press. ISBN 1-889818-12-7.
- Sceats, Sarah (2003) [2000]. Food, Consumption and the Body in Contemporary Women's Fiction. Cambridge, Cambridgeshire: Cambridge University Press. ISBN 0-521-66153-6.
- Schweid, Richard (Spring 2002). "Consider the Eel". Gastronomica. 2 (2). doi:10.1525/gfc.2002.2.2.14.
- Schweid, Richard (2002a). Consider the Eel. Chapel Hill & London: The University of North Carolina Press. ISBN 0-8078-2693-6.
- Stavely, Keith; Fitzgerald, Kathleen (2004). America's Founding Food: The Story of New England Cooking. Chapel Hill, North Carolina & London: The University of North Carolina Press. ISBN 0-8078-2894-7.
- Stavely, Keith; Fitzgerald, Kathleen (2011). Northern Hospitality: Cooking by the Book in New England. Amherst & Boston: University of Massachusetts Press. ISBN 978-1-55849-861-7.
- Wilson, C Anne (1976) [1973]. Food & Drink in Britain: From the Stone Age to Recent Times. Harmondsworth, London: Penguin. ISBN 0-14-055-101-8.
