= Eel as food =

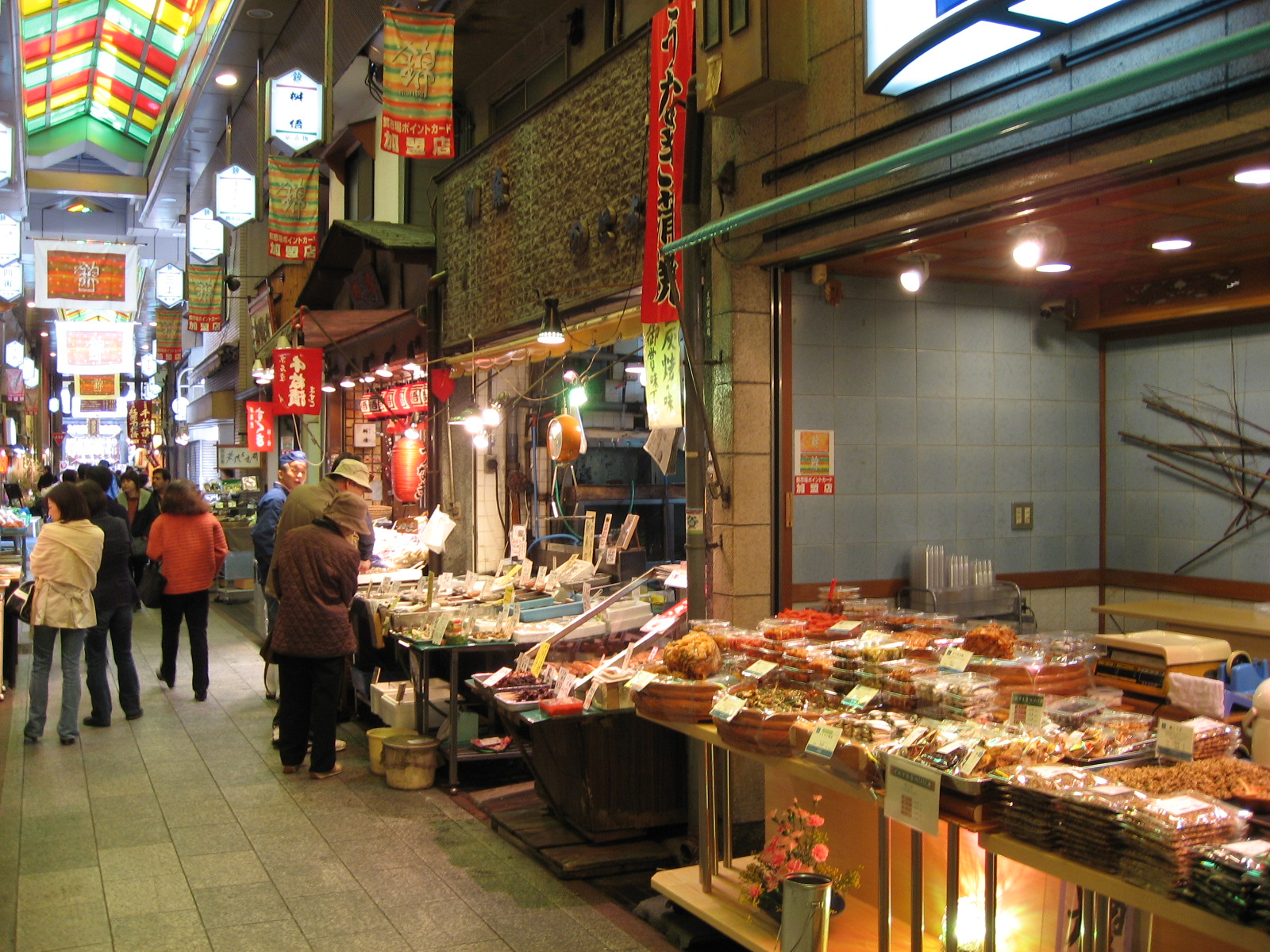
Eel shop in Japan

Eels are elongated fish, ranging in length from five centimetres (2 in) to four metres (13 ft), and are used in various cuisines around the world. Japan consumes more than 70 percent of the global eel catch.

Eel blood is poisonous to humans and other mammals, but both cooking and the digestive process destroy the toxic protein.

The flesh itself is oily.

== List of dishes ==
Freshwater eels (unagi) and marine eels (anago, conger eel) are commonly used in Japanese cuisine; foods such as unadon and unajuu are popular but expensive. Eels are also very popular in Chinese cuisine and are prepared in many different ways. Hong Kong eel prices have often reached 1000 HKD per kilogram and once exceeded 5000 HKD per kilogram. Eel is also popular in Korean cuisine and is seen as a source of stamina for men. The European eel and other freshwater eels are eaten in Europe, the United States, and other places. Traditional east London foods are jellied eels and pie and mash, although their demand has significantly declined since World War II. In Italian cuisine eels from the Valli di Comacchio, a swampy zone along the Adriatic coast, are especially prized along with freshwater eels of Bolsena Lake. Eels are popular in the cuisines of Northeast India. Freshwater eels, known as kusia in Assamese, are eaten with curry, often with herbs.

Locality	Type	Image	Description
England	Jellied eels		Jellied eels originated in 18th century England, mainly in the East End of London. The dish consists of chopped eels boiled in aspic stock that is allowed to cool and set, forming a jelly. It is eaten cold.
Belgium	Paling in 't groen ("Eels in the green")		Specialty of the Brussels – Dendermonde – Antwerp area. Freshwater eels cut to about 5 cm (2 in) pieces, cooked in green herb sauce. Usually served hot, either as hors-d'œuvre or with Belgian fries or bread; but can also be eaten cold.
Japan	Unagi		Unagi is the Japanese word for freshwater eels, especially the Japanese eel. Saltwater eels are known as anago. Unagi are a common ingredient in Japanese cooking.
Japan	Kabayaki		Kabayaki is a typical preparation of the unagi eel in Japan., sometimes extended to preparation of other fish, where the fish is split down the back (or belly), gutted and boned, butterflied, cut into square fillets, skewered, dipped in a sweet soy sauce-base sauce before broiled on a grill.
Japan	Unadon		Unadon, lit. "eel bowl", consists of a donburi type large bowl filled with steamed white rice, and topped with fillets of eel grilled in the kabayaki style, similar to teriyaki.
Korea	Jangeo-gui		Jangeo-gui is a gui (grilled dish) made with marinated and grilled freshwater eels.
Vietnam	Miến lươn		Miến lươn is cellophane noodle soup with eel, which is deep-fried or stir-fried, topped with bean sprout, wood ear, onion and coriander. It is a delicacy in Northern Vietnam, especially Hanoi.
Vietnam	Xúp lươn		Xúp lươn, lit. eel soup, is a soup dish made from eel or pork broth, consisting eels stir-fried with chive, onion, annatto and chilli powder. It is often served with bánh mì or bánh cuốn. This dish is a speciality in Nghe An province.
Widespread	Eel soup		
Widespread	Eel pie		
Widespread	Elvers		Elvers are young eels. Traditionally, fishermen consumed elvers as a cheap dish, but environmental changes have reduced eel populations. Similar to whitebait, they are now considered a delicacy and are priced at up to €1000 per kilogram. The Spanish angulas consists of sautéed elver in olive oil, garlic and a chili pepper. In Spain, these angulas are now rare and very expensive (a small serving of angulas can cost the equivalent of US$100 or more). There are also imitation angulas which can be purchased cheaply made of surimi.
Widespread	Smoked eel		Smoked eel is considered a delicacy in many localities, such as northern Germany, the Netherlands, the Czech Republic, Poland, Denmark and Sweden.

== Sustainability and conservation ==
Eels are a Priority Species under the UK Post-2010 Biodiversity Framework. The European eel (Anguilla anguilla) is listed as Critically Endangered on the global IUCN Red List of Threatened Species. While the Japanese eel (Anguilla japonica) and American eel (Anguilla rostrata) are assessed as Endangered.

In 2010, Greenpeace International added the American eel, European eel, and Japanese eel to its seafood red list. "The Greenpeace International seafood red list is a list of fish that are commonly sold in supermarkets around the world, and which have a very high risk of being sourced from unsustainable fisheries."

The US government deems the commercial eel industry was worth $12 million in Maine in 2017.

== History ==
Eels have been consumed in Britain since at least the 8th century, when they were mentioned by the English monk Bede. Eels were regarded as cheap, easy to catch, clean and cook, and were consumed most often around fasting days. By the 16th century, the demand for eels outstripped the fresh supply, and eels were often dried.

In London, the eels was a staple among the city's poor, with the fish at one time so common in the Thames that nets were set as far upriver as London itself. The first "Eel Pie & Mash Houses" opened in London in the 18th century, and the oldest surviving shop — M.Manze — has been open since 1902.

In North America, eels were long eaten by the Native American population, who broiled, stewed, and sometimes smoked their catch. As the English established colonies on the continent, they remarked on the abundance of eels, eating large quantities and considering them comforting reminders of home. These eels were cooked in a number of methods, including baking, boiling and frying. One recipe is relayed by the English traveller John Josselyn:

A common way it is to boil them in half water, half wine with the bottom of a manchet, a fagot of Parsley, and a little winter savory, when they are boiled they take them out and break the bread in the broth, and put to it three or four spoonfuls of yeast, and a piece of sweet butter, this they pour to their Eals laid upon sippets and so serve it up.

== Gallery ==
More images
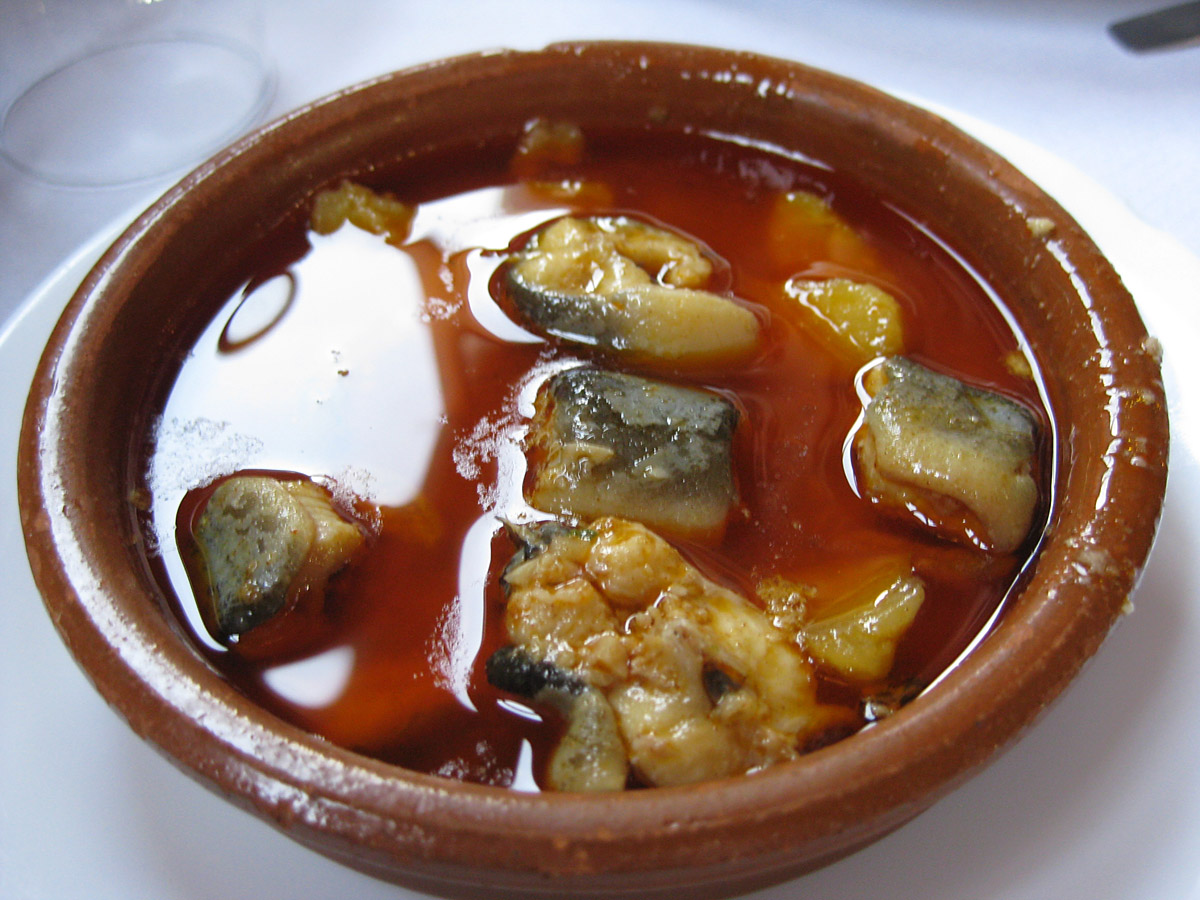
Dish with eels, Valencia, Spain.

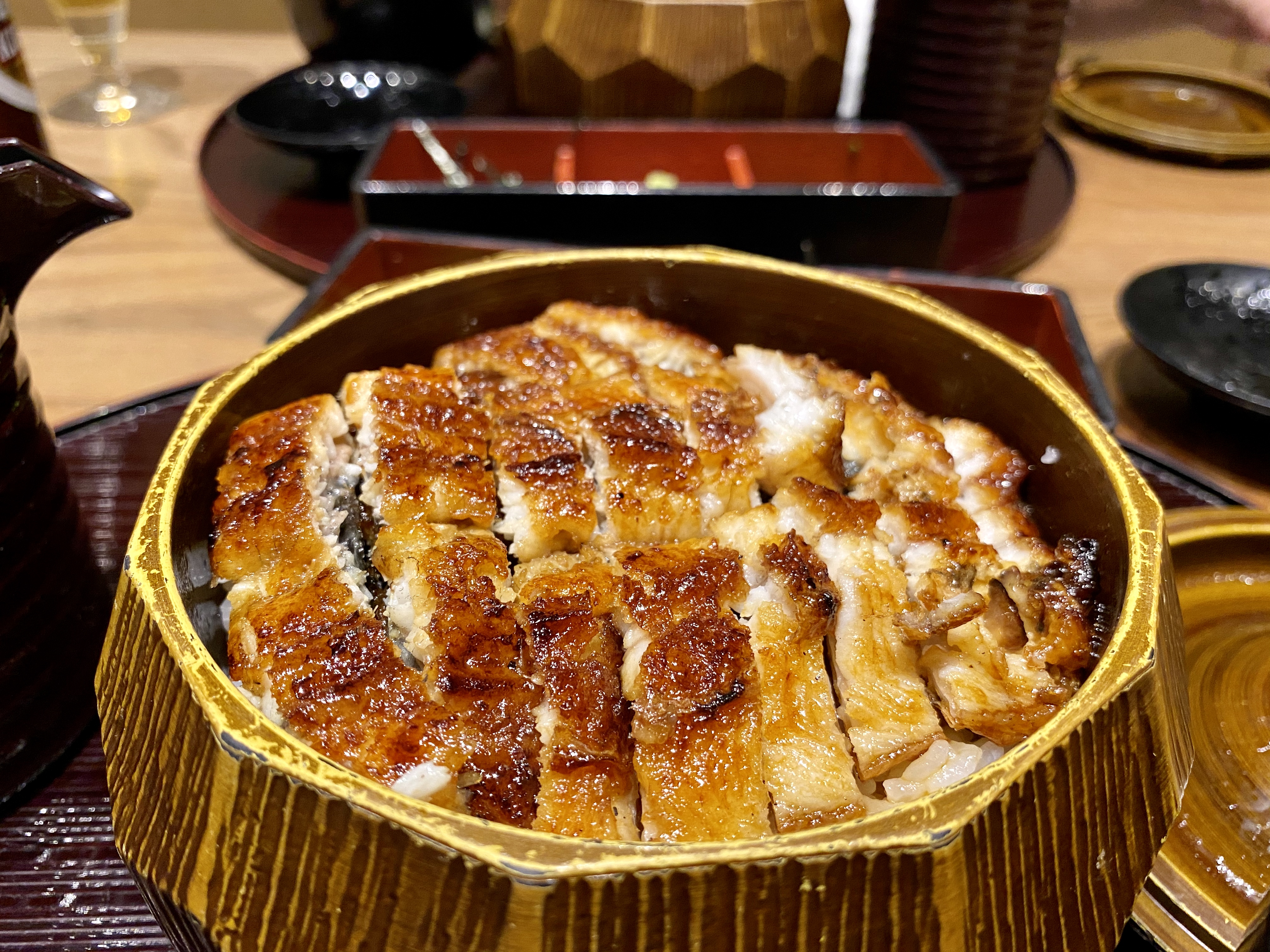
Rice bowl with grilled eel, Nagoya, Japan

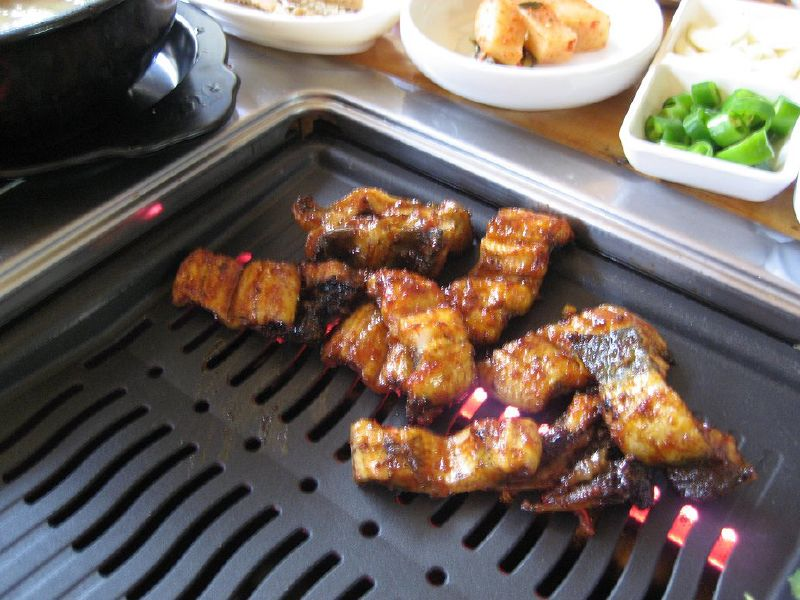
Marinated grilled eel, Korea

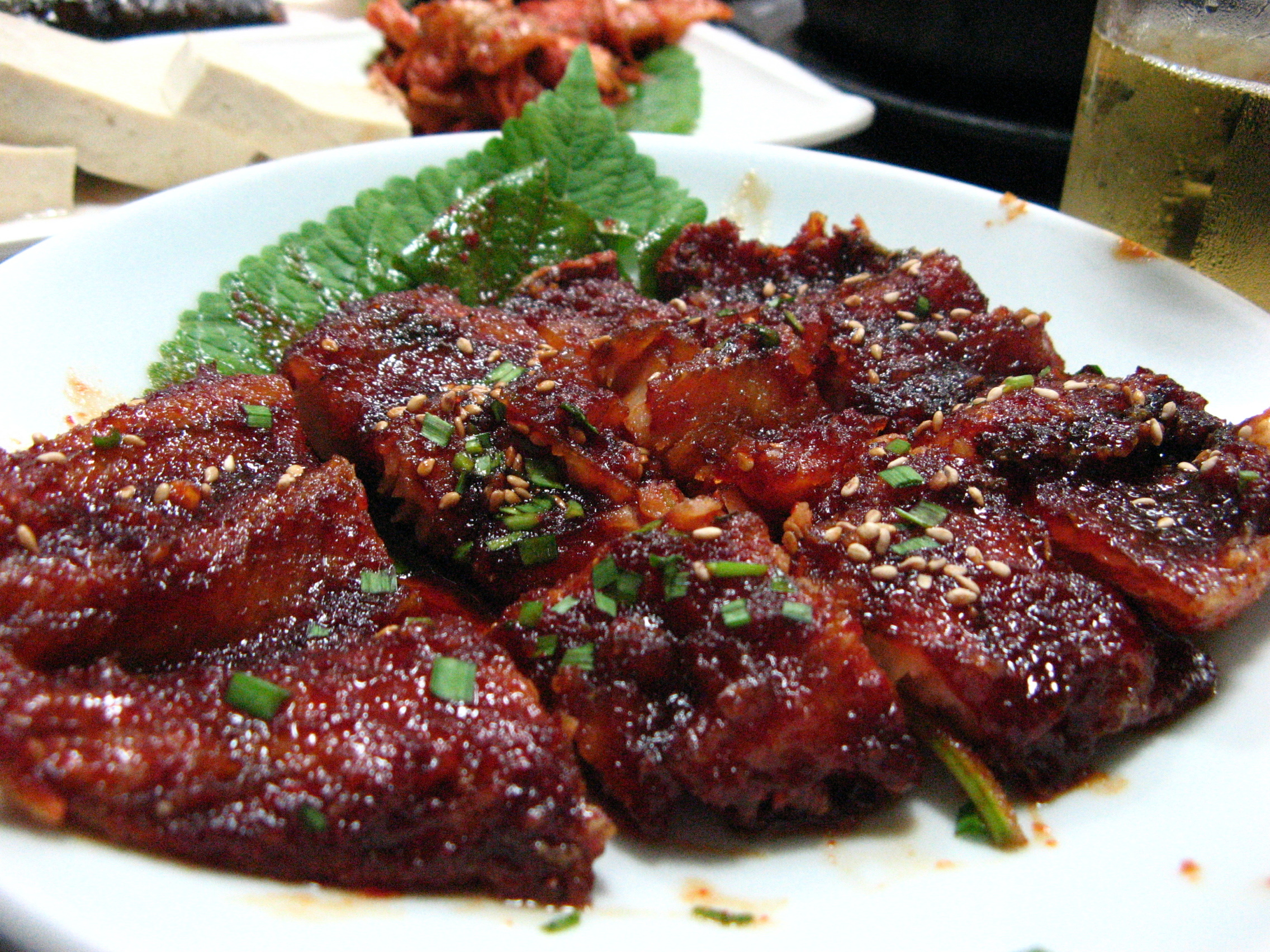
Grilled eel-Jangeo gui, Korea

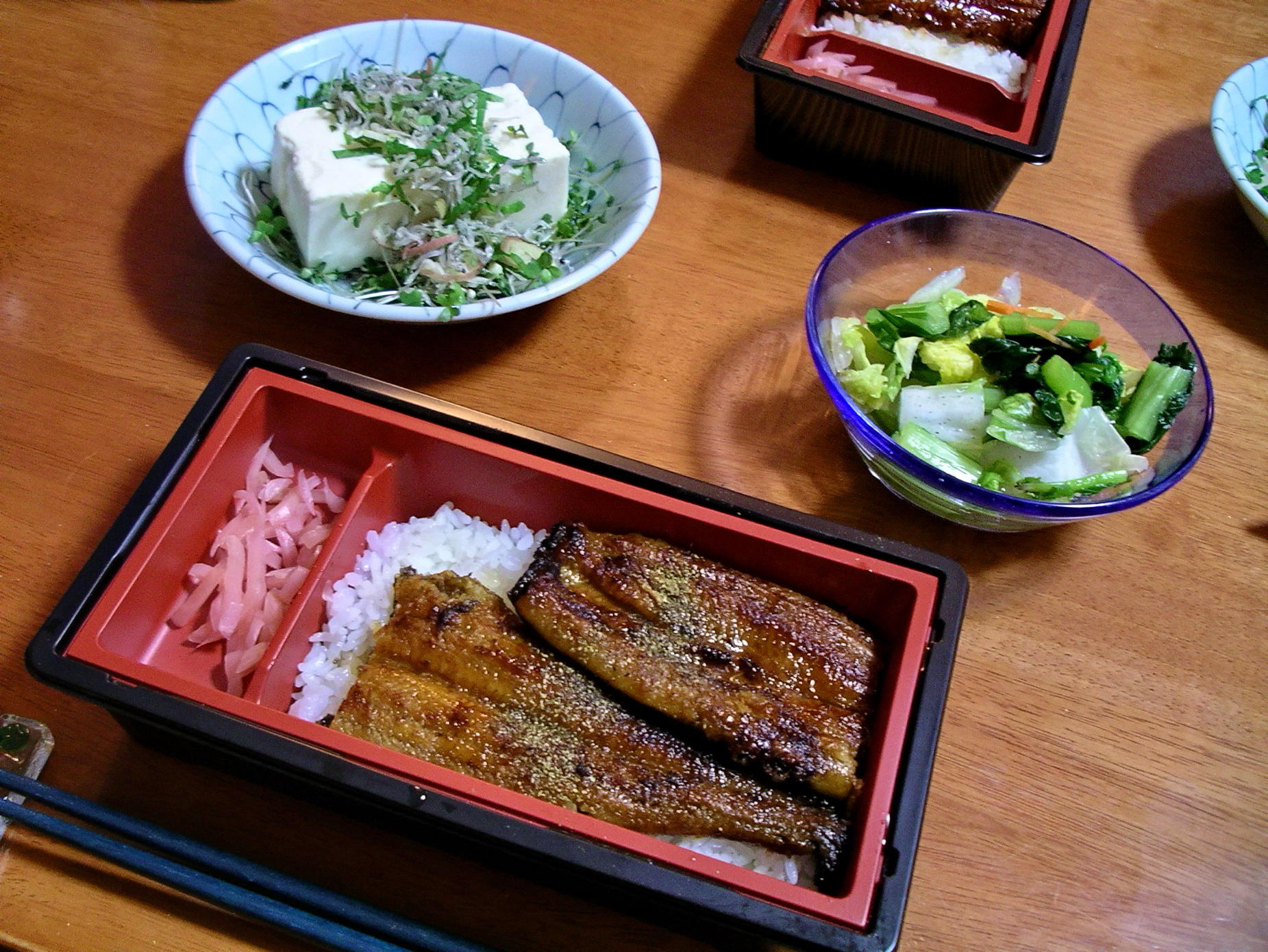
Grilled eel over rice, Japan

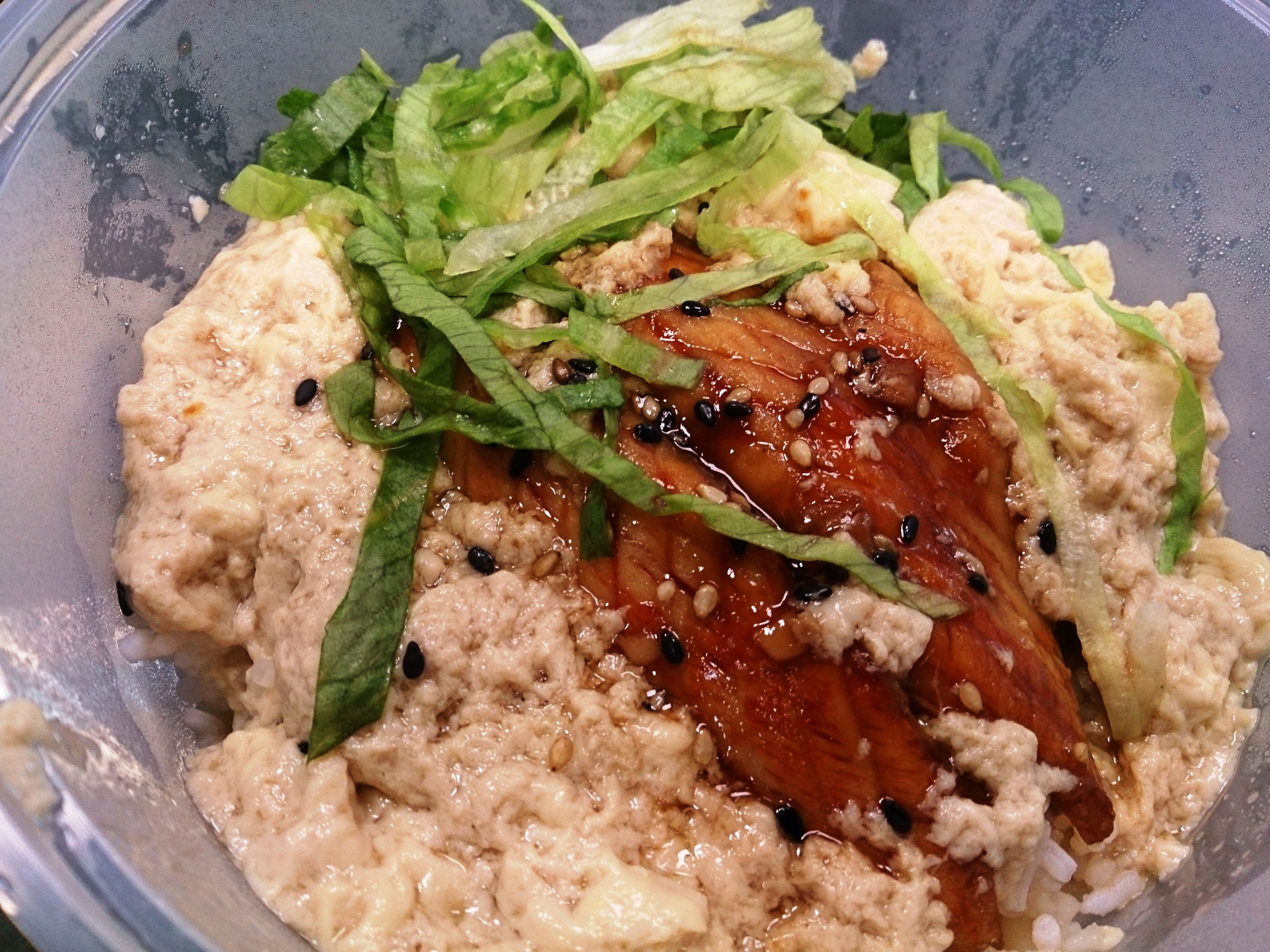
Unagi (Japanese for eel) rice

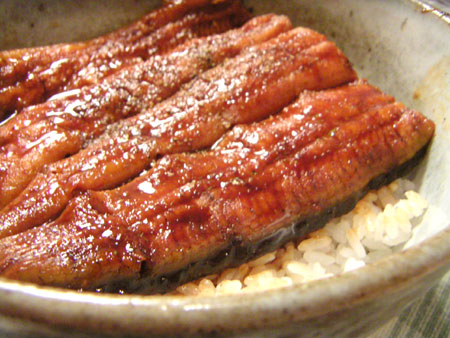
Bowl of rice topped with broiled eel, Japan

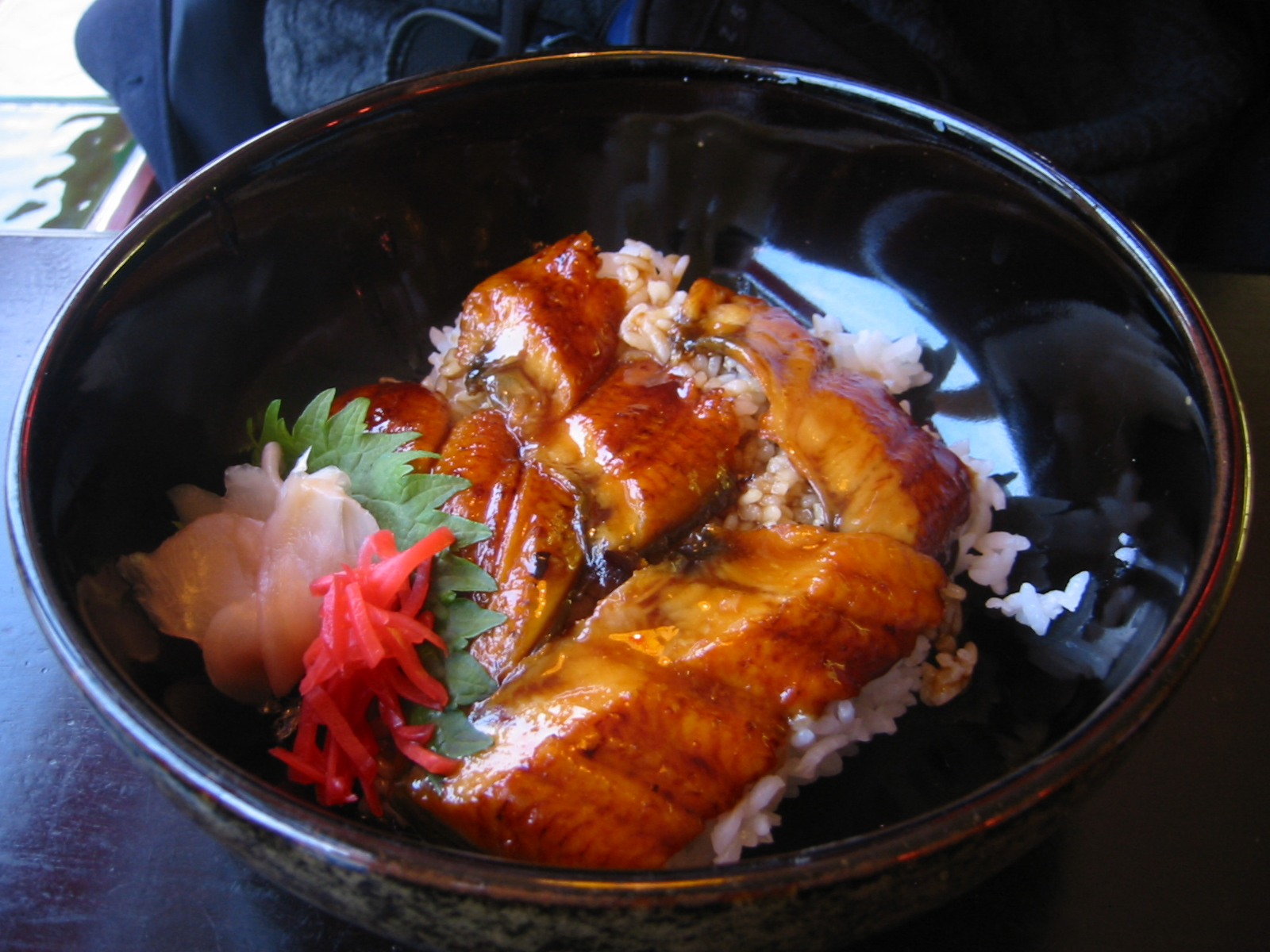
Eel on rice, Japan

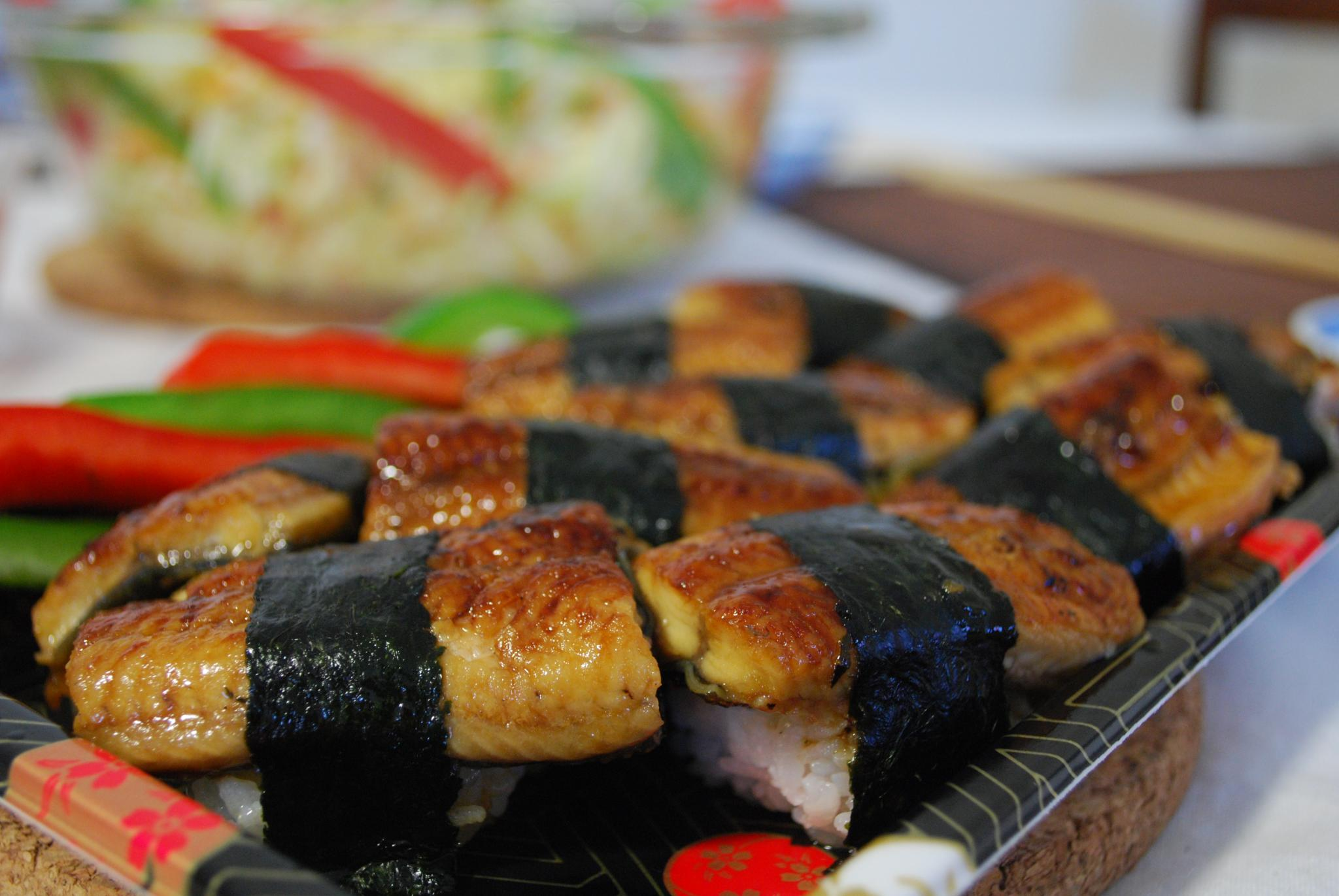
Eel with sweet, smoky sauce, Japan

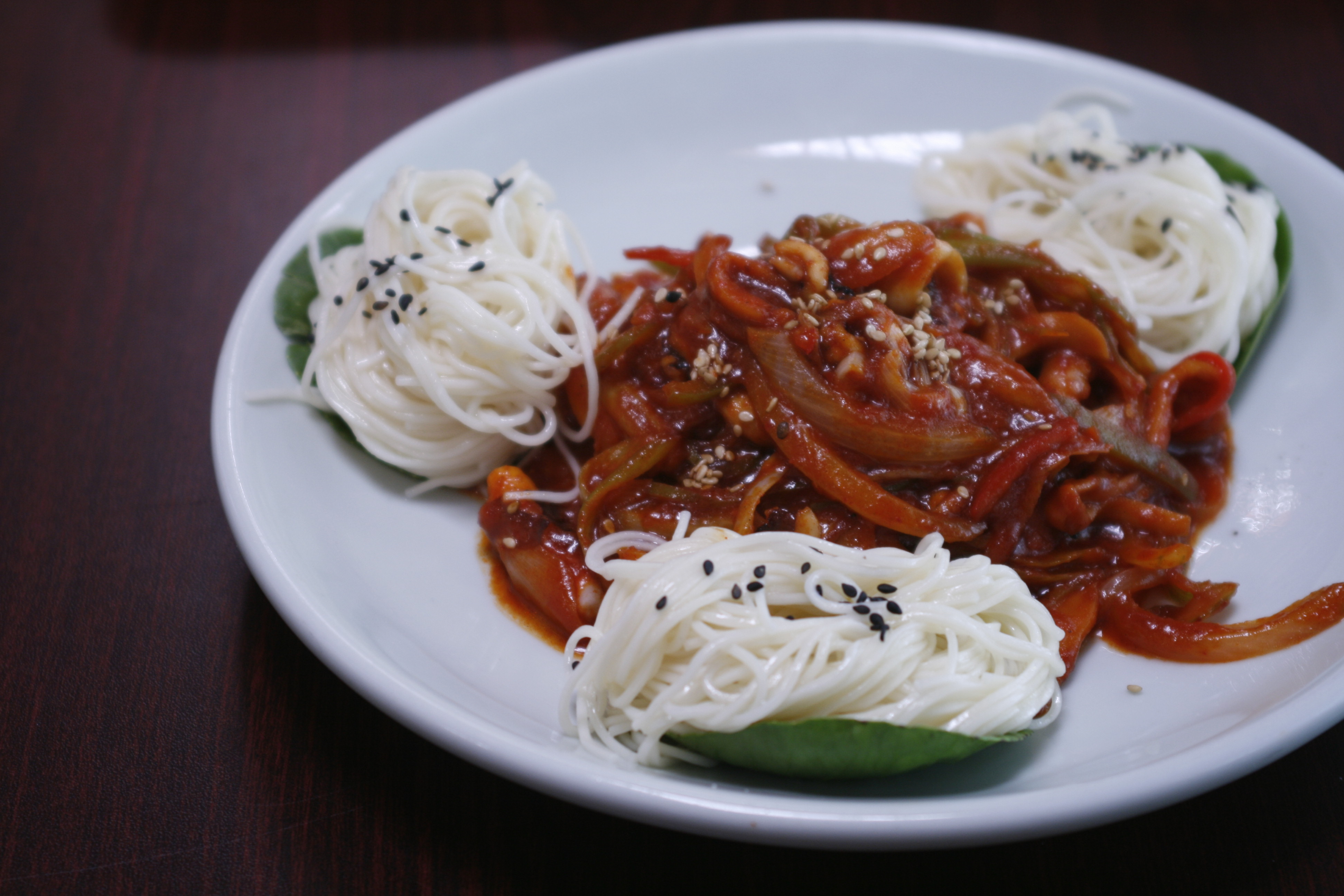
Anju-bokkeum, Korea

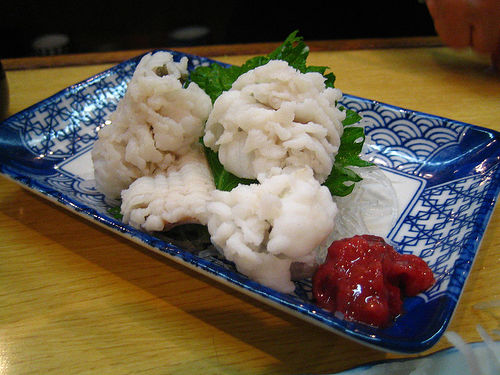
Pike eel with pickled plum, Japan

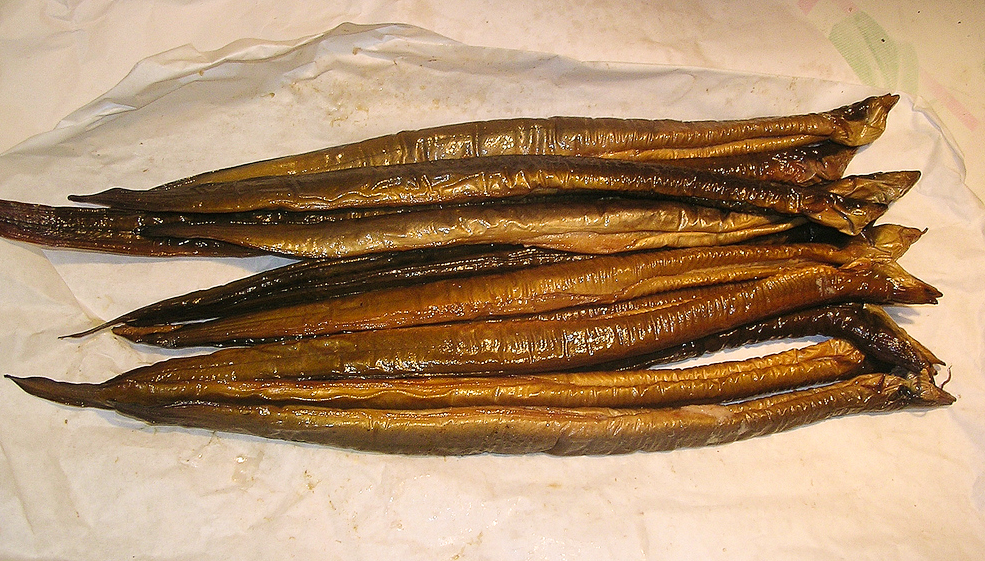
Smoked eel, Netherlands

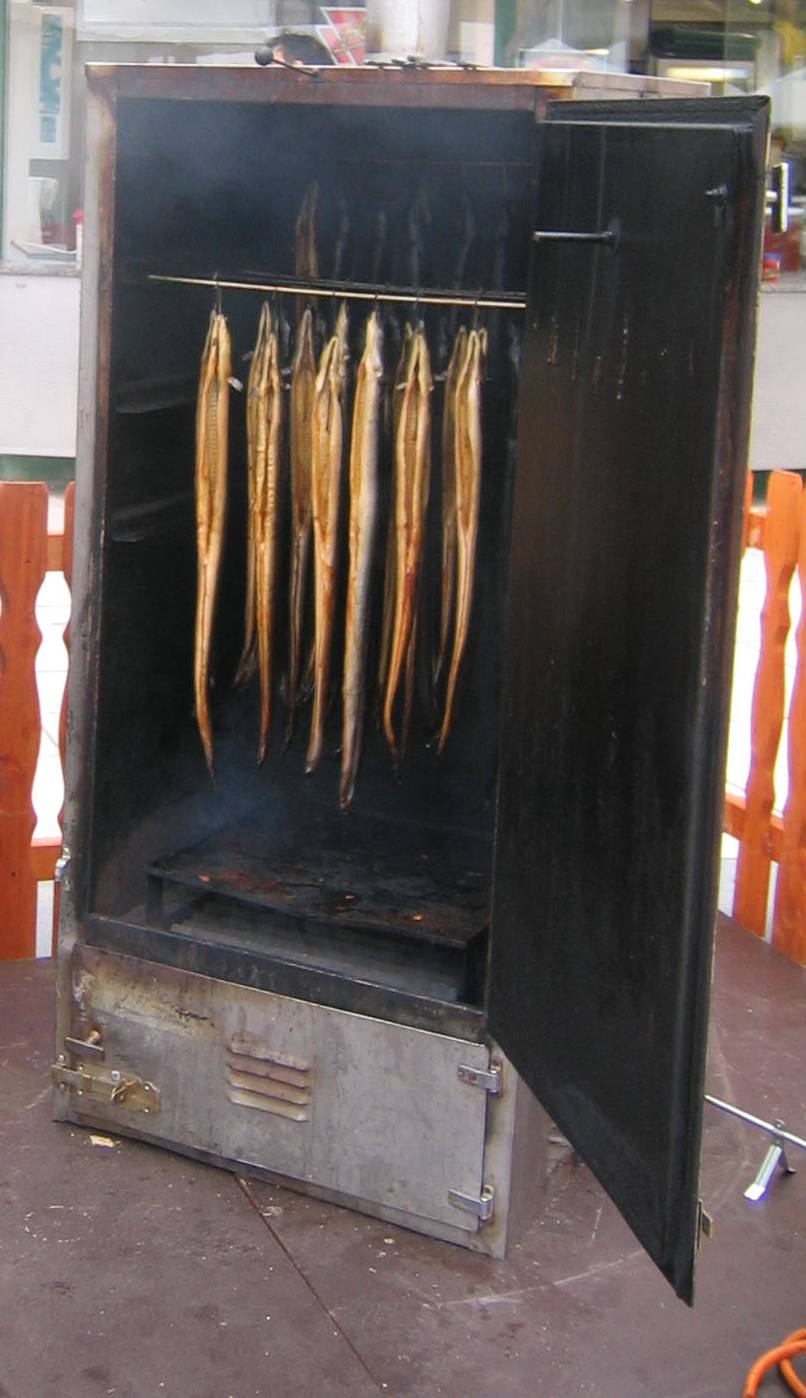
Smoking eels, Germany

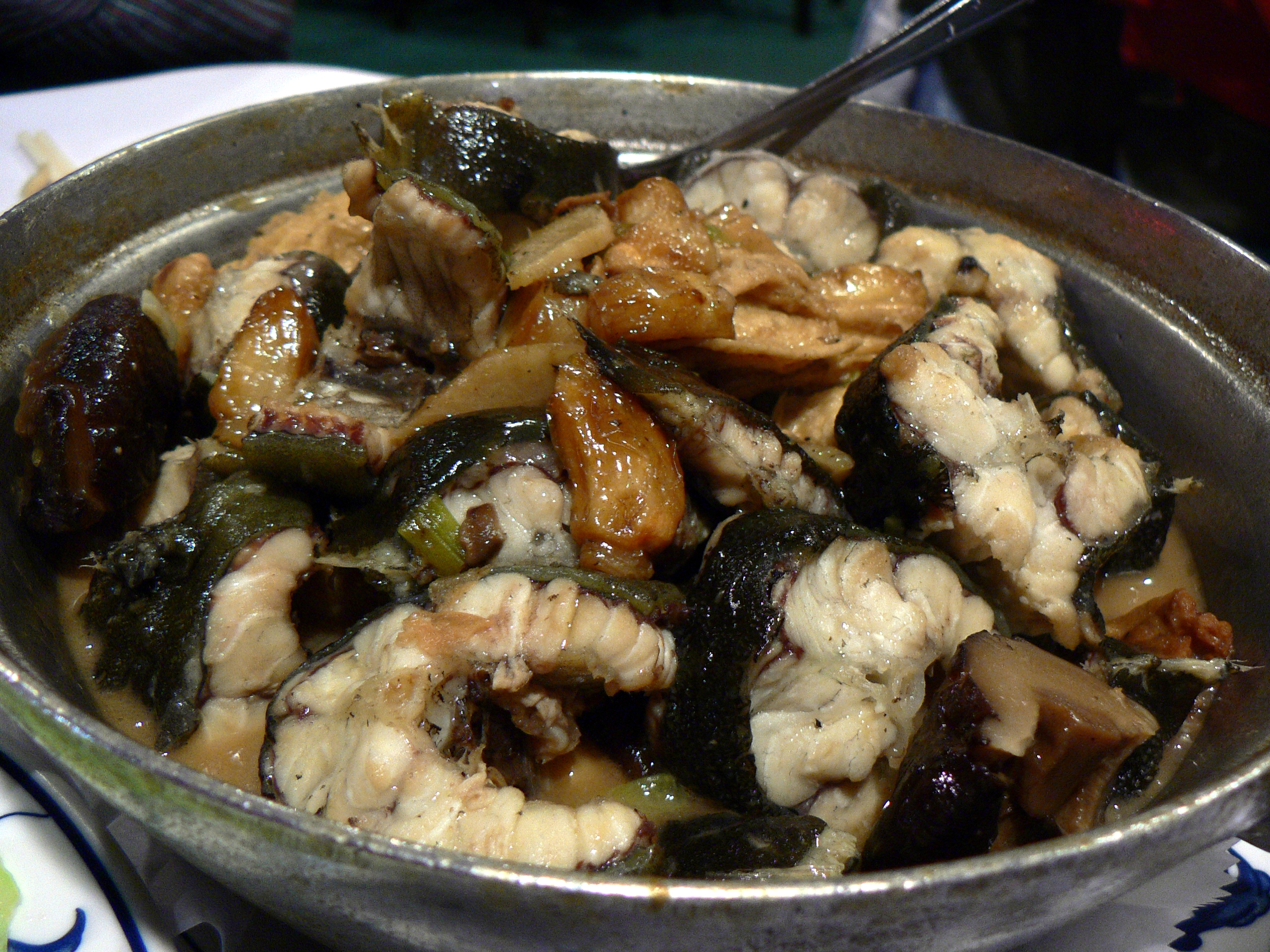
Eel with garlic

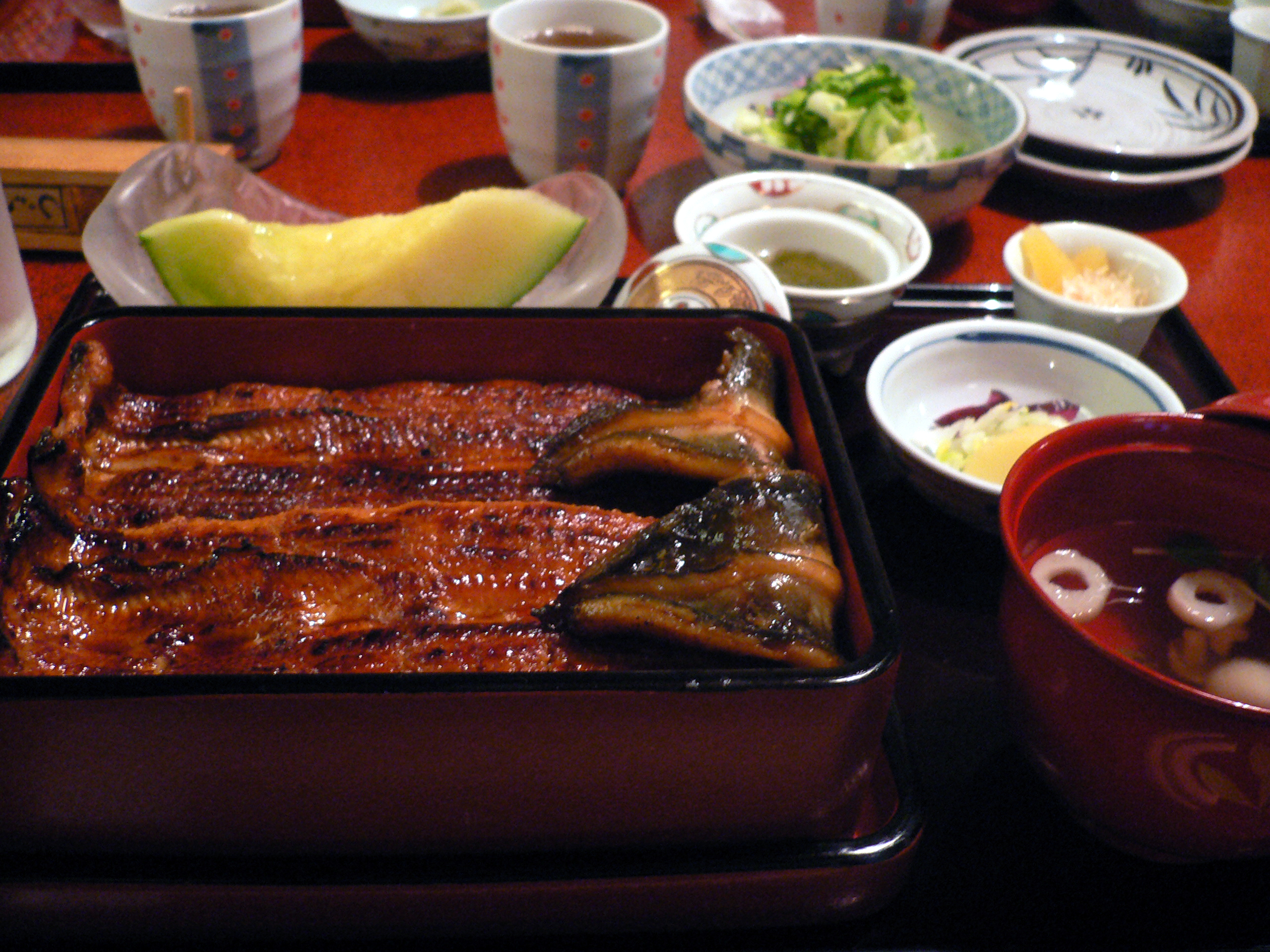
Unagi-broiled (kabayaki) eel on rice, served in a lacquered meal box

== See also ==
- Eel life history
- Pie and mash
