= Chapel Market =

Street and market in Islington, London

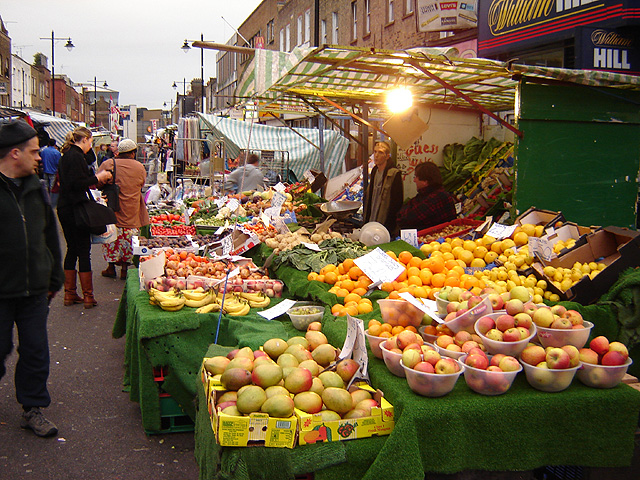
- Looking east on a Saturday afternoon in November 2005
- Location: Chapel Market; Islington, Greater London; 51.53342°N 0.10926°W
- Management: Islington London Borough Council
- Owner: Islington London Borough Council
- Environment: Outdoor
- Goods sold: General goods
- Days normally open: Tuesday–Sunday
- Number of tenants: 224 (87 permanent licensees)
- Interactive map of Chapel Market

Chapel Market is a daily street market in Islington, London. The market is located on a street of the same name near Angel, and sells fruit, vegetables and fish, as well as bargain household goods and cheap clothes. It is open every day except Monday, operating in the mornings only on Thursday and Sunday. The market is 2-3 blocks long; many of the patrons are local, and food and wares for sale are primarily for daily use. It has capacity for 224 stalls.

The ten-year-old Islington Farmers' Market relocated to Chapel Market in April 2010 and is held every Sunday at the Penton Street end.

Notable Chapel Market pubs include the Hundred Crows Flying and the Alma Lounge. The Agricultural, at the east end, got its name from the historic use of nearby Upper Street as a livestock route south into London and specifically to Smithfield meat market. The street also had an M.Manze pie and mash branch until 2019.

The street was also used for filming street seller scenes in the TV sitcom Only Fools and Horses.

In April 2024, it was reported that traders were worried that the market was at risk of "slowly dying" due to a lack of shoppers.
