= Jellied eels =

English dish made from chopped eels

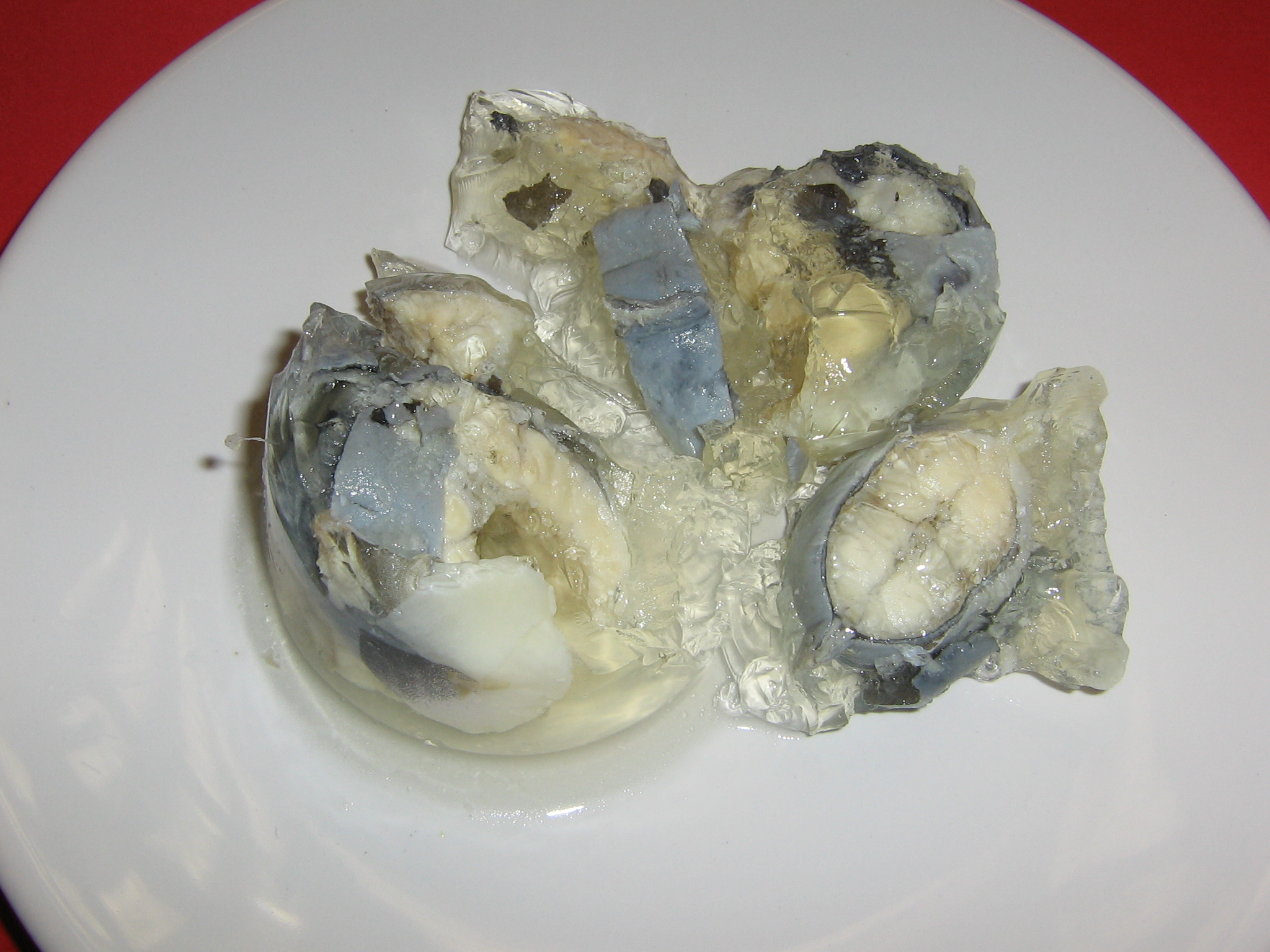
- A plate of jellied eels
- Place of origin: England
- Main ingredients: Eel, spiced stock

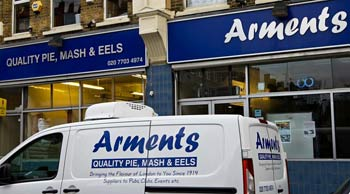
Traditional pie, mash, and eel shop, Walworth, South East London

Jellied eels is a traditional English dish that originated in the 18th century, primarily in the East End of London. The dish consists of chopped eels boiled in a spiced stock that is allowed to cool and set, forming a jelly. It is usually served cold.

== History ==
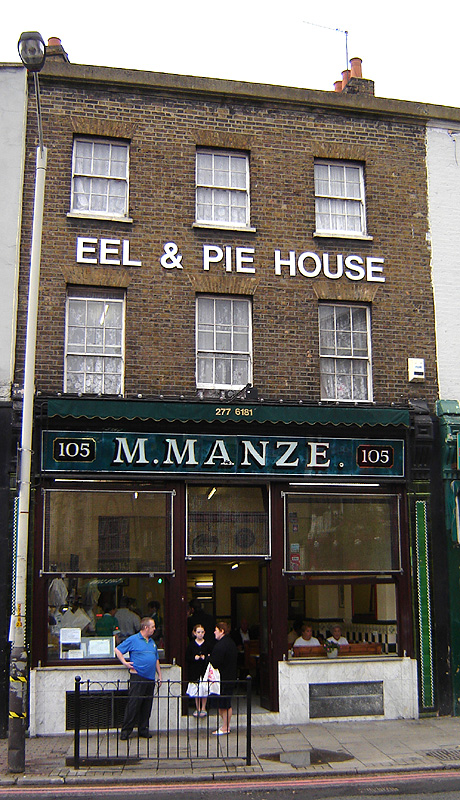
M.Manze pie and mash shop in Peckham

Eels were historically a cheap, nutritious and readily available food source for the people of London; European eels were once so common in the Thames that nets were set as far upriver as London itself, and eels became a staple for London's poor. The earliest known eel, pie and mash houses opened in London in the 18th century, and the oldest surviving shop, M.Manze, has been open since 1902. At the end of the Second World War, there were around 100 eel, pie and mash houses in London. In 1995, there were 87.

In 2026 there are relatively few eel, pie and mash shops, although jellied eels are sold in some of the capital's delicatessens and supermarkets. The water quality of the Thames, having improved greatly since the 1960s, has since become suitable once again for eels. The Environment Agency supports a Thames fishery, allowing nets as far upriver as Tower Bridge. However, the European eel is critically endangered.

== Preparation ==
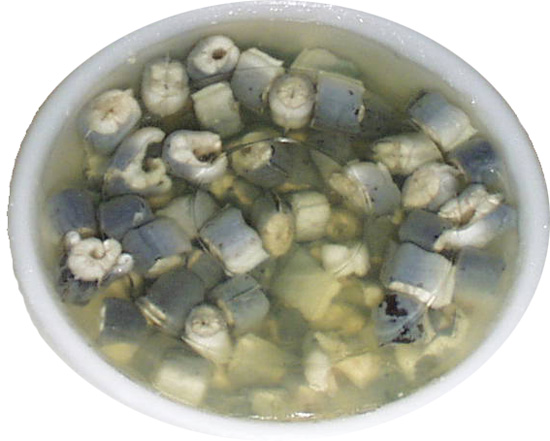
A bowl of eels set in jelly

Jellied eels are traditionally prepared using the European eels native to Britain. Typically, the eels are chopped (shucked) into rounds and boiled in water and vinegar to make a fish stock with nutmeg and lemon juice, before being allowed to cool. The eel is a naturally gelatinous fish, with the cooking process releasing proteins, like collagen, into the liquid, which solidify upon cooling to form a jelly, though gelatin may be added in order to aid this process.

Recipes for jellied eels are individual to particular London pie and mash shops, and also street sellers; however, traditional recipes for authentic Victorian jellied eels have common ingredients and cooking methods, with variation only in the herbs and spices used to flavour the dish.

Jellied eels are often sold with pie and mash, another traditional East End food, and eaten with chilli vinegar or with malt vinegar and white pepper.
