= Chilli vinegar =

Vinegar infused with chilli peppers

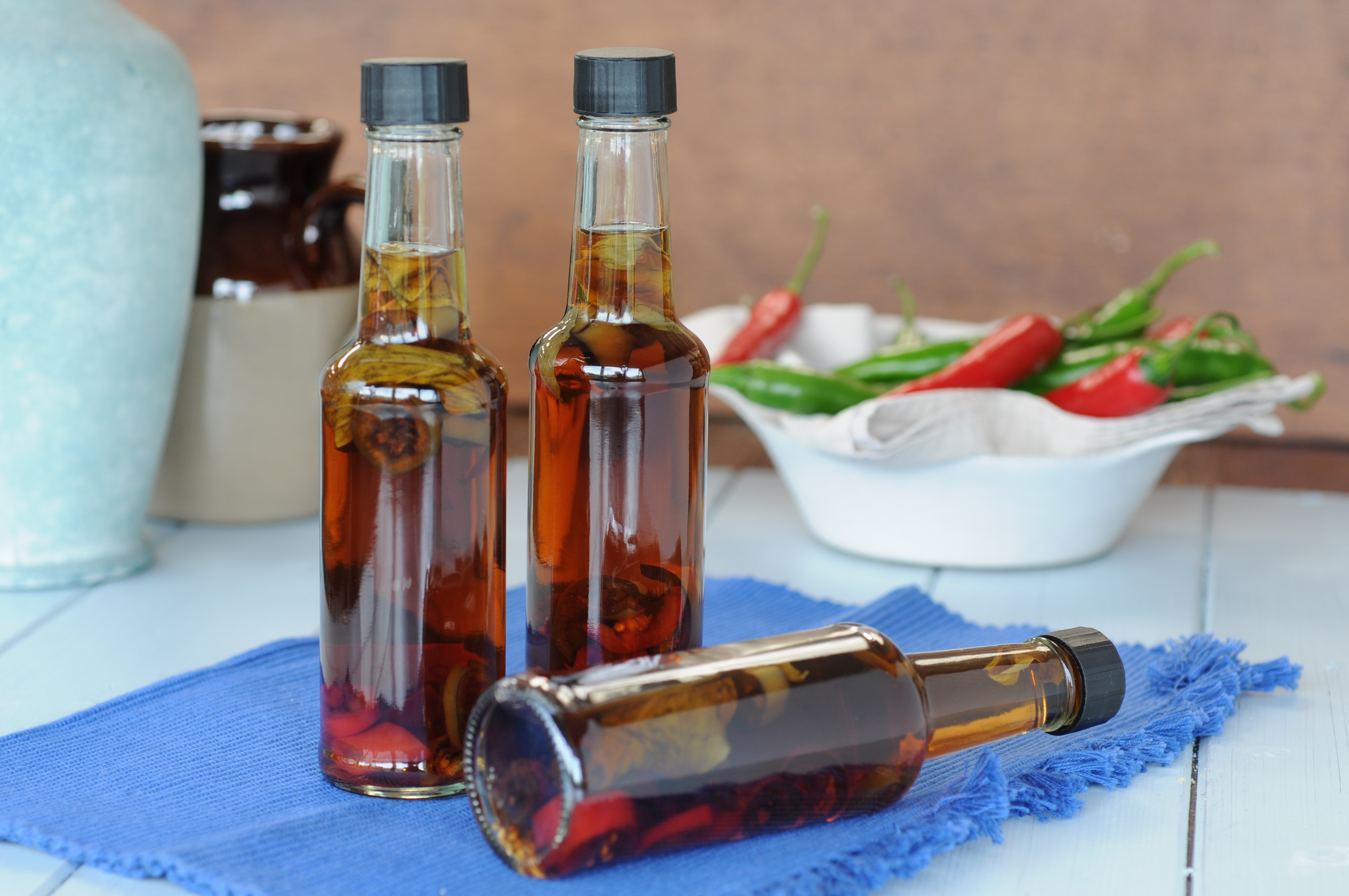
Bottles of Goddard's Pies non-brewed condiment infused with chillies and garlic. Commonly used on pie and mash food.

Chilli vinegar is a variety of malt vinegar infused with chopped or whole chilli peppers, which is a delicacy of the United Kingdom's capital city, London. Chilli vinegar is commonly used on foods associated with London's Cockney culture, such as pie and mash and jellied eels. Many recipes in Eliza Acton's 1845 book Modern Cookery for Private Families contain chilli vinegar as an ingredient.
