= M.Manze =

Restaurant in London, England

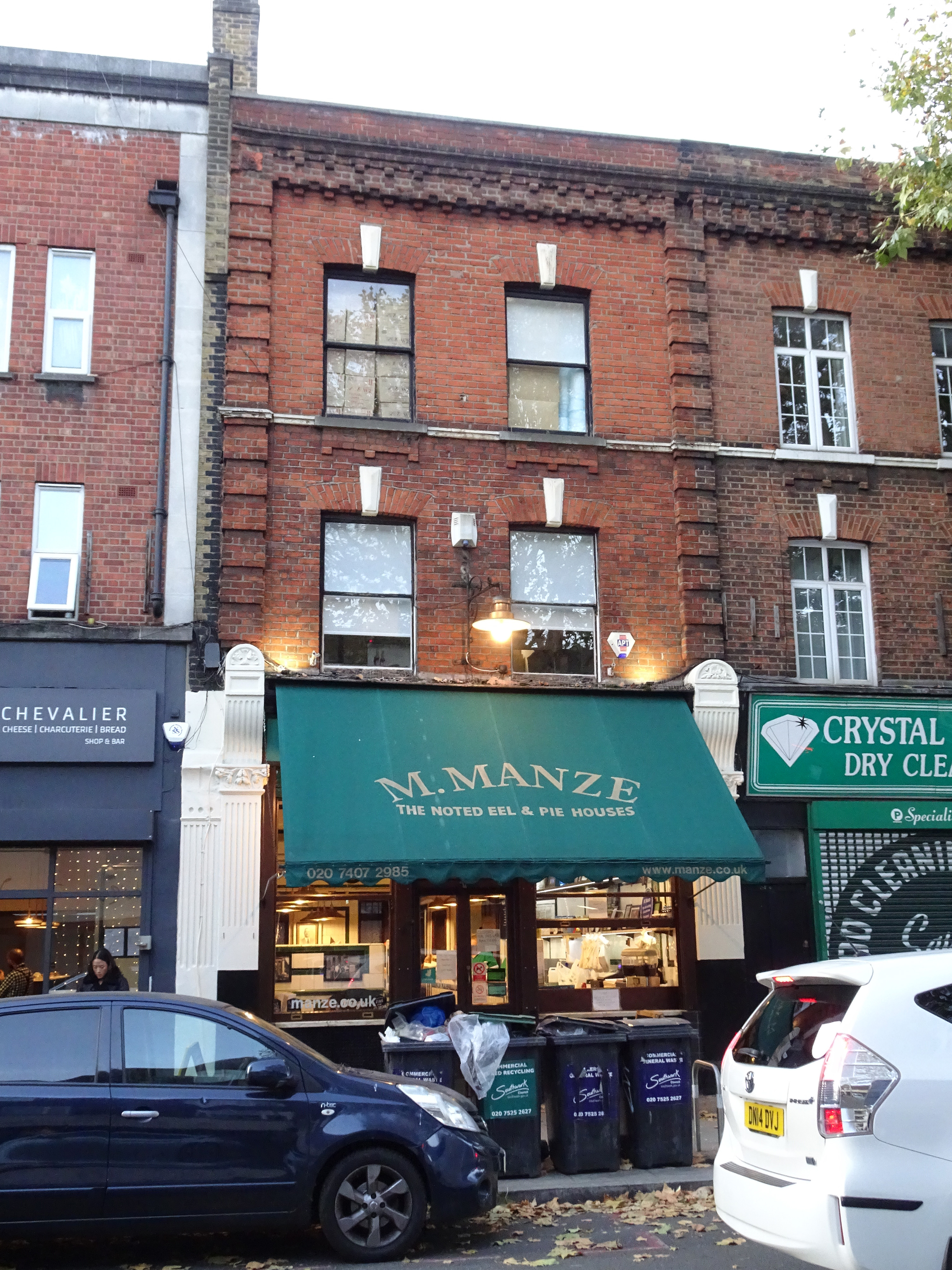
- The main restaurant's exterior in 2021

- Location within London Borough of Southwark Location within Greater London Location within the United Kingdom

Restaurant information
- Established: 1892
- Owner: Manze family
- Location: 87 Tower Bridge Rd, London SE1 4TW, United Kingdom
- Coordinates: 51.4962°N 0.0827°W
- Website: www.manze.co.uk

Listed Building – Grade II
- Official name: M Manze Pie and Eel Shop
- Designated: 30 September 1994
- Reference no.: 1195522

Listed Building – Grade II
- Official name: L Manze Eel, Pie and Mash Shop
- Designated: 28 October 2013
- Reference no.: 1416834

M.Manze is a restaurant in the Bermondsey district of London, England. It is known for serving pie and mash with eel and was first opened in 1892. As of 2024, two other locations are operating and still run by the Manze family under the M.Manze brand, in Peckham and Sutton.

== History ==
The main and flagship location of M.Manze is located on Tower Bridge Road in the Bermondsey district of London. It was opened in 1892 by Robert Cooke. Michele Manze, Cooke's son-in-law, bought the restaurant from him in 1902. His family and he had immigrated to Britain from Ravello in Italy in 1878 and worked as ice merchants and ice cream makers. They wanted to offer a more "substantial food", so they turned to selling pie, mash, and eels. Manze continued to open restaurants, including another one in Bermondsey in 1908, which closed by 1932. Two stores that opened in Poplar were destroyed in World War II. Manze opened a location in Peckham in 1927, one of three M.Manze stores still operating. Manze's brothers also opened stores, reaching fourteen Manze restaurants in 1930.

When Michele Manze died in 1932, his son, Lionel, took charge of both shops. The Peckham location was burnt down during the 1985 Brixton riot, starting a legal battle that was not settled until 1995. Lionel died in 1988 and left his three sons, Graham, Geoff, and Richard (Rick), to run the restaurants. The Sutton location opened in 1998. The Islington location of the restaurant, which had been open since 1911 at Chapel Market, became a Grade II listed building under Historic England on 30 September 1994. After years of struggling and low sales, it closed on 30 April 2019. It was later replaced by The Beefsteaks in 2023. Another Grade II listed building of the Manze brand, in Walthamstow, was opened by Michele's brother Luigi in 1929 and was run by the Manze family until 1970. It closed in 2022, from a combination of reduced footfall from the COVID-19 pandemic and a change in demographics. It was replaced by a Japanese restaurant, Taro. Geoff and Graham both retired in May 2019, causing Rick's daughter Emma and her husband Tom to start working at the restaurant.

== Menu ==
The pies are handmade and are created in the restaurant daily. The crust is filled with minced beef and gravy and covered, then cooked in the oven. A vegan version made with soybeans is also available. The potatoes are then mashed to make the mash. The pie and mash is then served with a variant of parsley sauce called "liquor". The eels are delivered to the shops daily and prepared there. When they are in season, the eels come from the River Thames, and when they are not, they are imported from Holland.

M.Manze works with Just Eat and Deliveroo to supply hot food to customers in London.
