= De honesta voluptate et valetudine =

First printed cookbook by Bartolomeo Platina

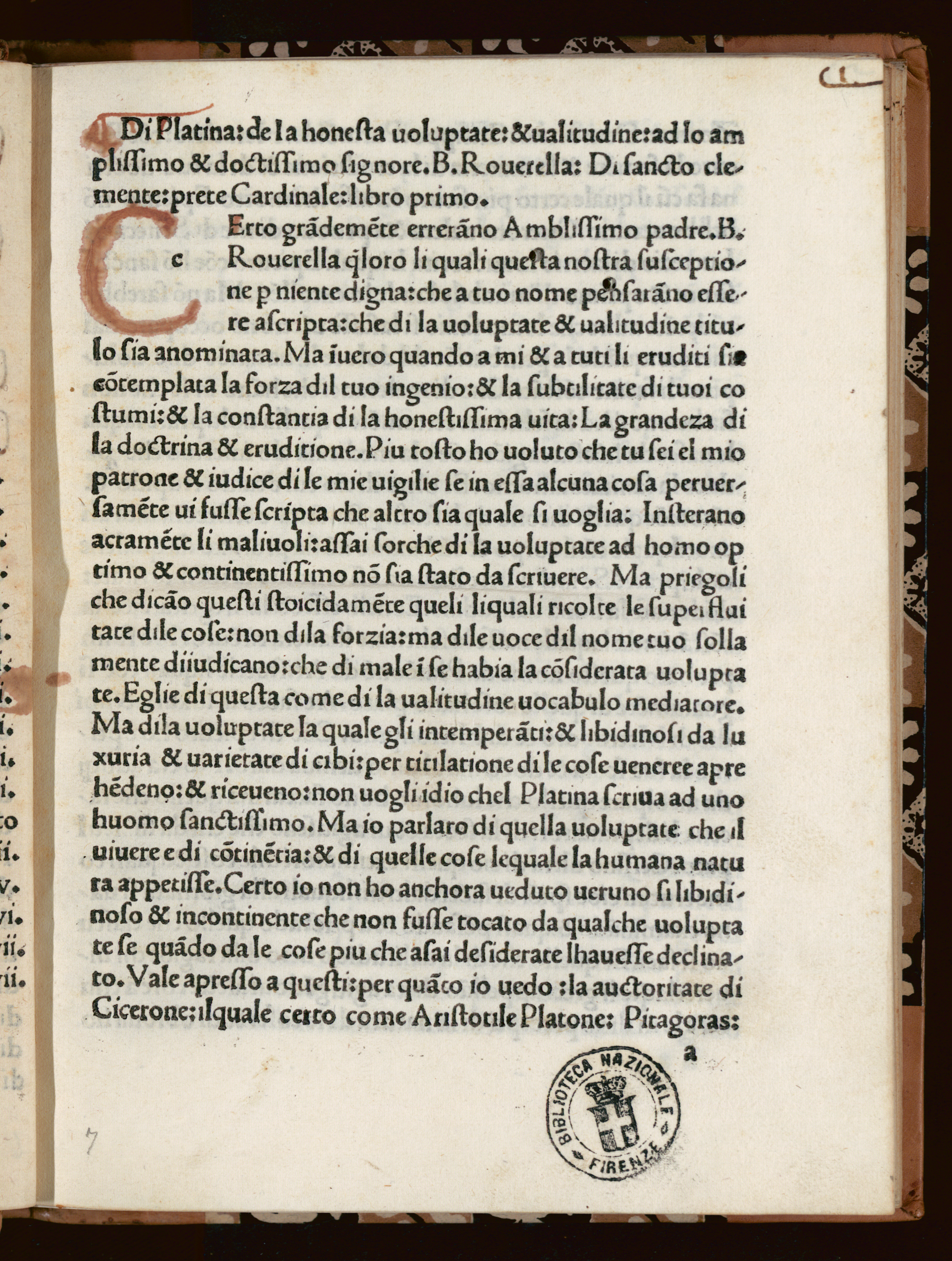
1494 edition, printed in Venice

De honesta voluptate et valetudine (transl. On honest indulgence and good health, often shortened to De honesta voluptate) was the first cookbook ever printed. Written c. 1465 by Bartolomeo Platina, it first appeared between 1470 and 1475 in Rome, and in 1475 in Venice. Written in Latin, it was largely a translation of recipes by Martino da Como from his Libro de Arte Coquinaria (c. 1465). The book was frequently reprinted over the next century, and translated into French, German, and Italian.

== History ==
Written by Platina between 1465 and 1466, De honesta voluptate et valetudine was the first cookbook to ever be published on a mass scale. Many versions were distributed during the Renaissance period, both in the original Latin and numerous European languages and vernaculars. The book saw diffusion across the European continent and is considered a kitchen manual, highlighting the pleasure of eating through the acquisition and preparation of ingredients. By these measures, the book had a broad reach across audiences; it was originally intended to inform the choices of cooks in the houses of elites, but translations into the vernacular did all the work to reach those in the middle class who were looking to inform themselves on the cuisine of the time.

Platina composed his work in a complex structure of ten books with recipes that have now been primarily attributed to the work of his contemporary and highly regarded Renaissance chef, Maestro Martino da Como. The work consists of original recipes that were based on traditional practices and combined techniques from the medieval period with new Arabic and Catalan flavors. Unlike prior works, Platina paid close attention to the process of cooking; he included cooking times based on the hour system, observations to determine progression through a recipe (color, consistency, etc.), and discussed aspects of the ingredients to be used. The books are arranged to suggest the order in which the provided recipes should be served at a dinner. He combines his technical instruction with anecdotes, notes on eating habits, and tips related to the recipes he presents. In the first chapters, emphasis is placed on the elements, the seasons, and the bodily humor offering a basis for comments in regards to how the recipes he included are expected to impact the body. Platina includes recipes for meats, vegetables, herbals, soups, fruit dishes, sauces, and desserts, among other commentaries on ingredient selection. Platina presented cooking as an esthetical experience and a mode of not only providing sustenance but also enjoyment to the consumer. Yet, Platina's work does highlight that pleasure from food is different from gluttony and is rather linked to temperance and the desire for increased health.

== Editions ==
- c. 1474: Rome, Udalricus (or Uldericus) Gallus
- 1475: Venice, Laurentius de Aquila and Sibylinus Umber
- 1475: Venice, Pietro Mocenico
- 1480: Cividale di Friuli, Gerardi de Flandria
- 1480: Leuven, John of Westphalia
- 1494: Venice, Bernardinus Benalius
- 1498: Venice, Bernardinus Venetus de Vitalibus
- 1499: Bologna, Johannes Antonius de Benedictis
- 1503: Venice, Joannes Tacuinus, de Tridino (reprinted 1517)
- 1508: Venice
- 1517: Strasbourg, Johann Knobloch
- 1529: Cologne, Eucharius Cervicornus (reprinted 1537)
- 1530: Paris, Jean Petit
- 1541: Lyon
- 1541: Basel

== Translations ==
- 1487: Italian (reprinted 1494, 1508 and 1516)
- 1505: Platine en françoys, Lyon, François Fradin; translated with additions by Didier Christol (reprinted 1509, 1522, 1528, 1539, 1548, 1559, 1567, 1571)
- 1530: Von alten Speisen und Gerichten, Strasbourg (reprinted 1533, 1536 and 1542)
- 1967: De honesta voluptate: the first dated cookery book, Saint Louis, Mallinckrodt collection of Food Classics volume 5; translated by Elizabeth Buermann Andrews
- 1975: The temperate voluptuary, Santa Barbara, Capra Press; translated by Jerred Metz
- 1999: Platina's On Right Pleasure and Good Health, Asheville, Pegasus; translated and with critical analysis by Mary Ella Milham

== See also ==
- List of medieval cookbooks
