= Parsley sauce =

Cream sauce seasoned with parsley

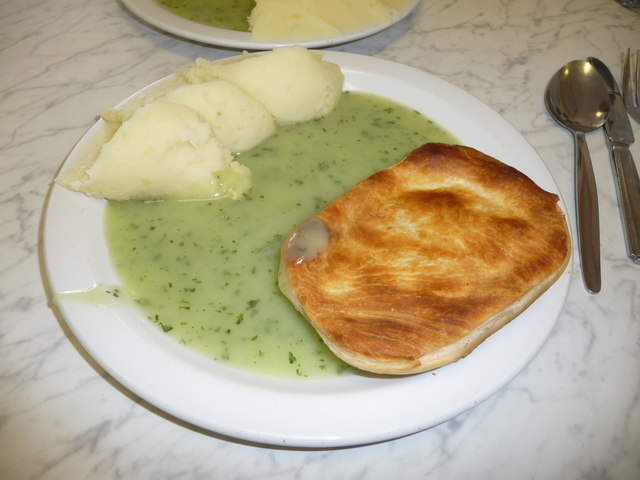
Liquor Parsley sauce with traditional British pie and mash

Parsley sauce is a cream sauce seasoned with parsley.

It is essentially a simple béchamel sauce containing chopped parsley. A variant called "liquor" is often served with pie and mash as a traditional British food, particularly in London.

Parsley sauce is easy to make. Most recipes call for 5-7 ingredients and involve 3 steps.
