= Mary Ella Milham =

American classicist (1922–2010)

- Born: 22 March 1922; Waukesha, Wisconsin, U.S.
- Died: 9 December 2010 (aged 88); Fredericton, New Brunswick, Canada

Academic background
- Education: Carroll University; University of Wisconsin-Madison
- Thesis: A glossarial index to De re coquinaria of Apicius (1950)

Academic work
- Discipline: Classics
- Institutions: University of New Brunswick

Mary Ella Milham (22 March 1922 – 9 December 2010) was an American-Canadian Professor of Latin and Greek at the University of New Brunswick from 1954 until her retirement in 1987. She was the first female president of the Classical Association of Canada.

== Career ==
Milham received her BA in English and Latin from Carroll University and her MA and PhD in Classics and Linguistics from the University of Wisconsin–Madison. In 1954 she joined the department of Classics and Ancient History at the University of New Brunswick, where she taught until her retirement in 1987. Milham published numerous articles on Latin cookbooks, particularly Apicius and Platina. In 1998 she published an edition and translation of Platina's De honesta voluptate et valetudine, the first printed cookbook.

Milham was active in the Classical Association of Canada, including as chair of the Committee on the State of Classical Studies, which produced the 'Milham Report' on the state of Classics in Canada in 1976. She was president of the organisation 1984–86, the first woman to hold this position.

== Awards and honours ==
Milham was elected to the New York Academy of Sciences in 1986. The University of New Brunswick Milham Lectures, established in 1987, were named in honour of Milham. She received the State Historical Society of Wisconsin Award in 1989. A festschrift in her honour, What's Cooking?: a Festschrift in Celebration of the 75th Birthday of Mary Ella Milham. (ed. J. S. Murray), was published in 1997.

== Selected publications ==
- — (1959). "Aspects of non-technical Vocabulary in Apicius". The American Journal of Philology. 80 (1): 67–75. doi:10.2307/291888. JSTOR 291888.
- — (1959). "An Inventory of the Double Accusative in Apicius". Classical Philology. 54 (1): 40–42. doi:10.1086/364322.
- — (1966). "In Defense of Hamburger: Apicius and Roman cooking". Vergilius. 12: 46–48.
- — (1970). "Apicius in the Northern Renaissance, 1518-1542". Bibliothèque d'Humanisme et Renaissance. 32 (2): 433–443. JSTOR 20674745.
- — (1972). "The manuscripts of Platina "De Honesta voluptate..." and its source, Martino". Scriptorium. 26 (1): 127–129.
- — (1972). "Leyden and the fortuna of Apicius". Renaissance Quarterly. 25 (2): 188–91. doi:10.2307/2859236. JSTOR 2859236.
- — (1998). "Platina, on Right Pleasure and Good Health: A Critical Edition and Translation of De Honesta Voluptate Et Valetudine". Medieval & Renaissance Texts & Studies. 168. ISBN 9780866982085.
