= Pie and mash =

Traditional British food

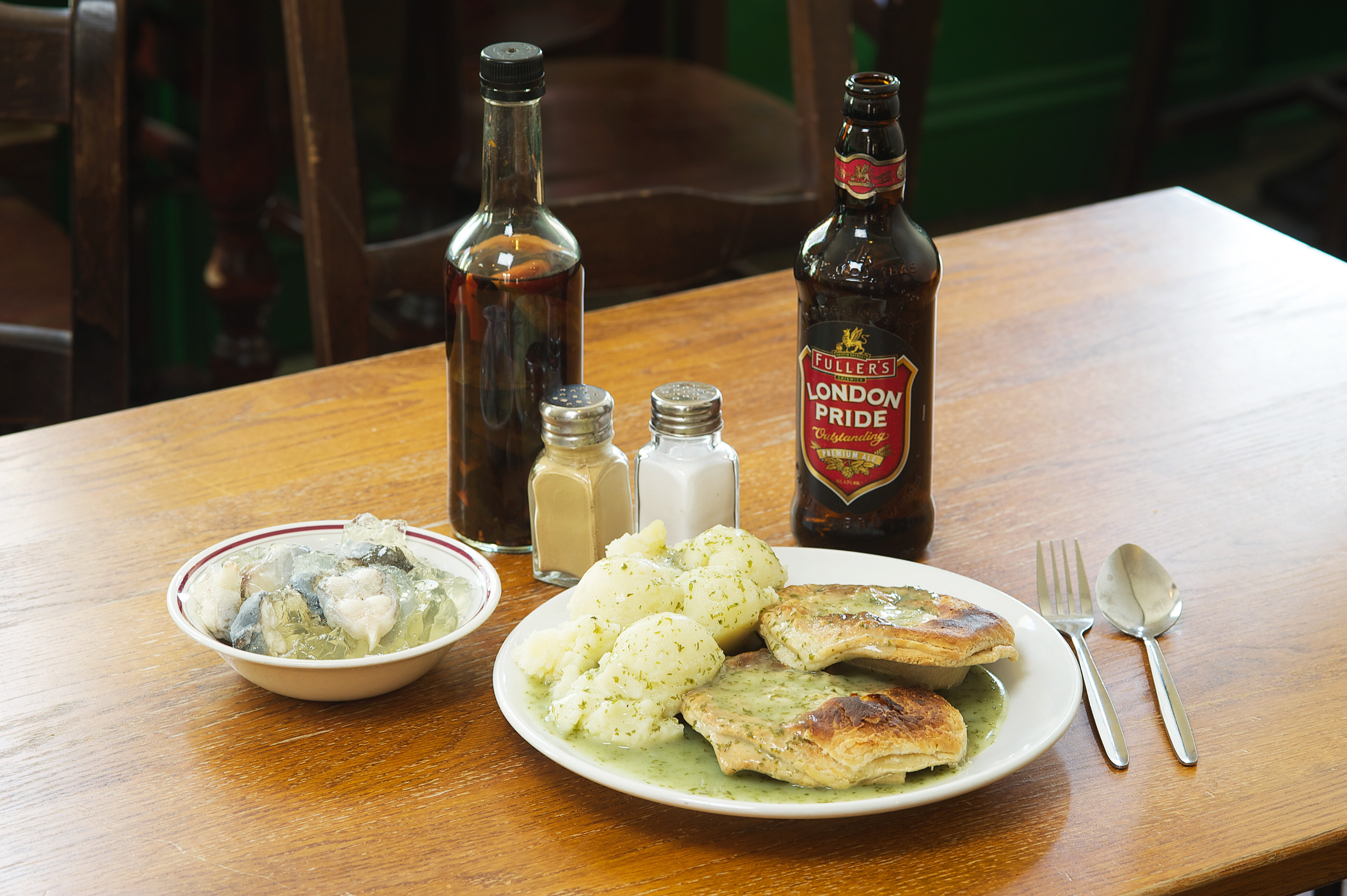
- A typical serving of pie and mash with liquor and eels
- Alternative names: Pie, mash and liquor
- Course: Main course, snack
- Place of origin: England
- Region or state: London
- Associated cuisine: English cuisine
- Serving temperature: Hot
- Main ingredients: Shortcrust pastry, minced meat, mashed potatoes, parsley sauce

Pie and mash is a British working-class food, originating in the docks of London, considered "a Cockney classic". It typically consists of a minced beef pie (formerly also eel pie) served with mashed potato and a parsley sauce known as liquor, with malt vinegar or non-brewed condiment (similar to vinegar) as a condiment. Pie and mash shops have been in London since the 19th century and are still common in East and South London, as well as many parts of Kent and Essex.

== History ==
During the Victorian era, the East End of London was largely working class.

Pie and mash originated in the early 1800s, when extensive docks first opened in East London. Dock workers needed an inexpensive, warm meal, and pie men began serving eel pies from carts and market stalls. The eels typically came from Dutch fishing boats. Minced meat trimmings later replaced jellied eel.

The first known pie and mash shop was Henry Blanchard, located in Southwark. It opened in 1844; this establishment added mashed potato to the meat pie. Other early shops are Robins, established in 1926, and M.Manze, which opened in Bermondsey in 1892.

During World War II, government food rationing threatened pie and mash shops with closure, but due to public demand, the Ministry of Food was persuaded to allow these traditional eateries to remain open. As a result, pie and mash supplemented family rations amid the widespread national food shortages, and along with fish and chips, that other traditional British working-class dish, pie and mash increased in popularity among middle-class families, too.

Since 2010, as revealed in a joint study by the Zoological Society of London and the Environment Agency, the number of eels captured in research traps in the River Thames fell from 1,500 in 2005 to 50 in 2010, meaning most eels used in pie and mash shops are now from the Netherlands and Northern Ireland.

As eel consumption continues to decline in the 21st century (in 2000, only one stall was selling live eels in Billingsgate Market), the number of eel and pie shops has continued to go down; 87 eel and pie shops were in greater London in 1995, compared to around 110 at the end of the 1800s. In 2024, only 34 pie shops were left.

== Composition ==
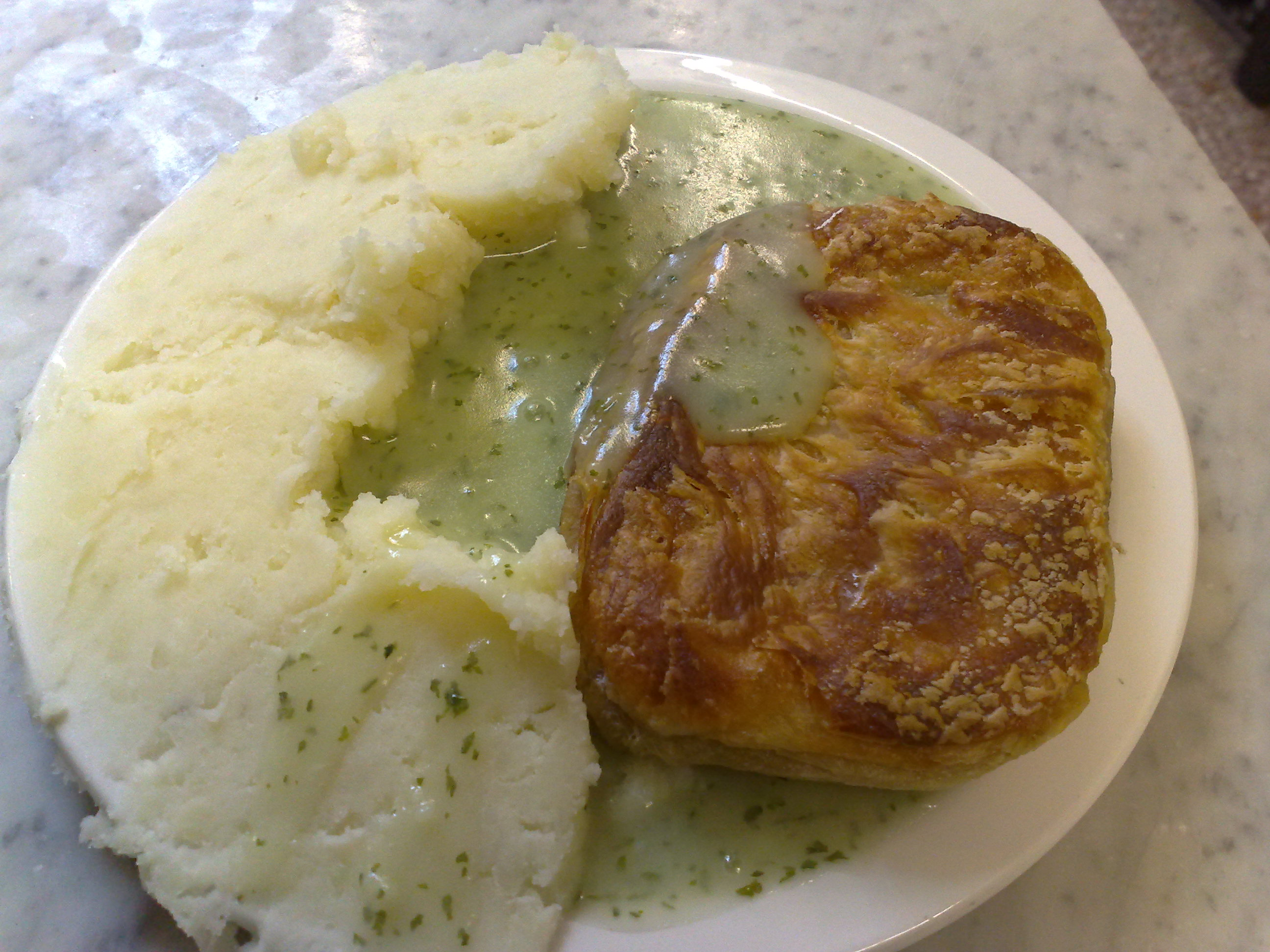
Pie, mash, and liquor served at M.Manze on Tower Bridge Road, Bermondsey

The main dish sold is pie and mash, a minced-beef and cold water-pastry pie served with mashed potato. Two types of pastry should be used; the bottom or base should be suet pastry and the top can be rough puff or short. Commonly, the mashed potato are spread around one side of the plate. The meat pie and mashed potato are served atop or covered with a parsley sauce. Commonly called "liquor sauce" or simply "liquor" (liquor as in a liquid in which something has been steeped or cooked), it was traditionally made using the water kept from the preparation of the stewed eels, flour, salt, pepper, and chopped parsley. However, many shops no longer use stewed eel water in their parsley liquor, opting for chicken stock, instead.

Many pie and mash shops serve hot, stewed, or cold, jellied eel as a side dish. Malt vinegar and chilli vinegar are typical condiments used with the dish.

== Shops ==
Before shops became common, trading took place from braziers or carts. Shops did not begin to appear until late Victorian times. The shops became part of the local community and heritage of their area; for example, L. Manze in Walthamstow became Grade II listed by English Heritage in 2013 due to its architectural and cultural significance.

Traditionally, pie and mash shops have large, open windows, long, marble-topped tables, and tiled walls. Originally, the floor was wood covered in sawdust; removal of the sawdust made for easy cleaning. Today, floors are tiled. Pie and mash is served with a fork and spoon, almost never with a knife, so the pie filling and remaining liquor can be scooped up.

Because of the large number of pleasure boat steamer companies offering Sunday trips on the River Thames, many Eastenders used them to explore the more gentrified west of London. The result was that many also wanted their traditional foods of ale and pie and mash, resulting in the renaming of both a hotel that they frequently visited and the island on which it sat in Twickenham to Eel Pie Island in the early 1900s.

Pie and mash shops in London
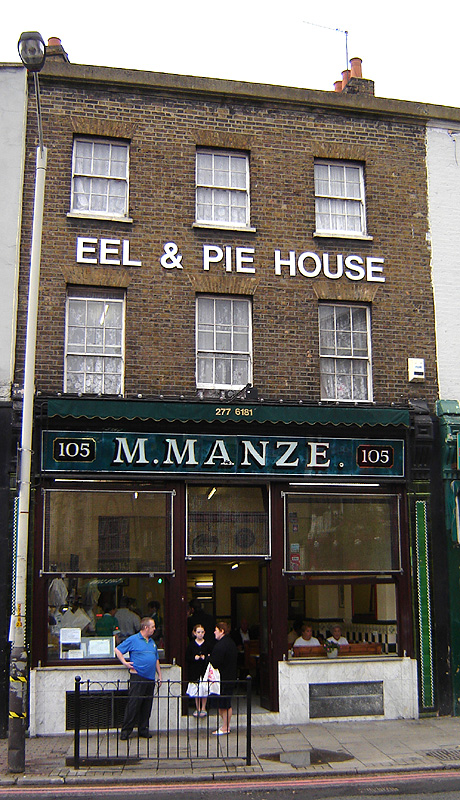
M. Manze, Peckham

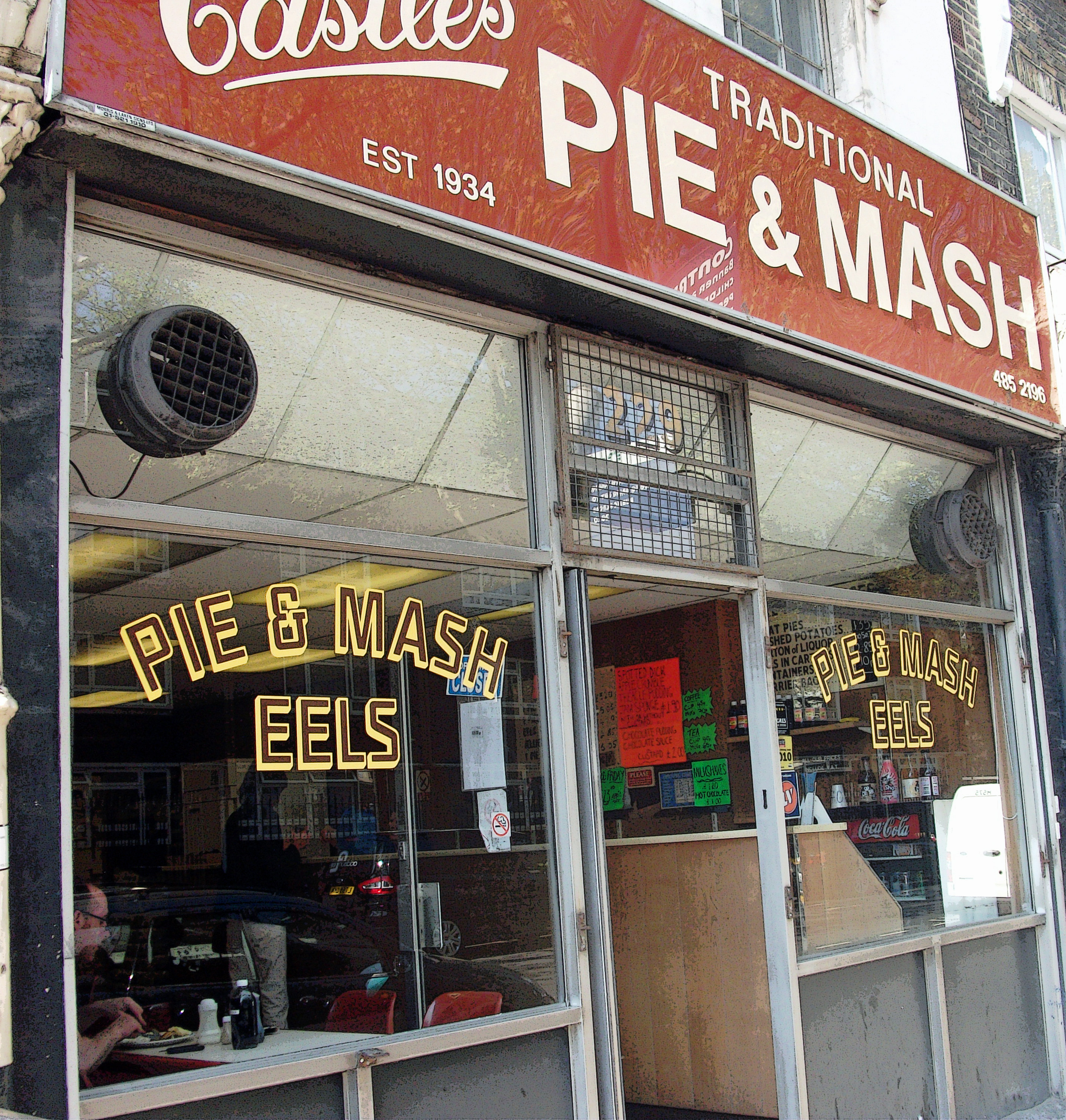
Castle's, Camden Town

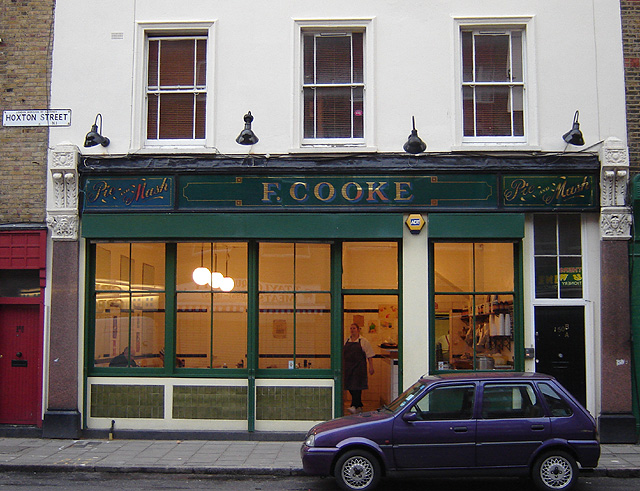
F. Cooke, Hoxton

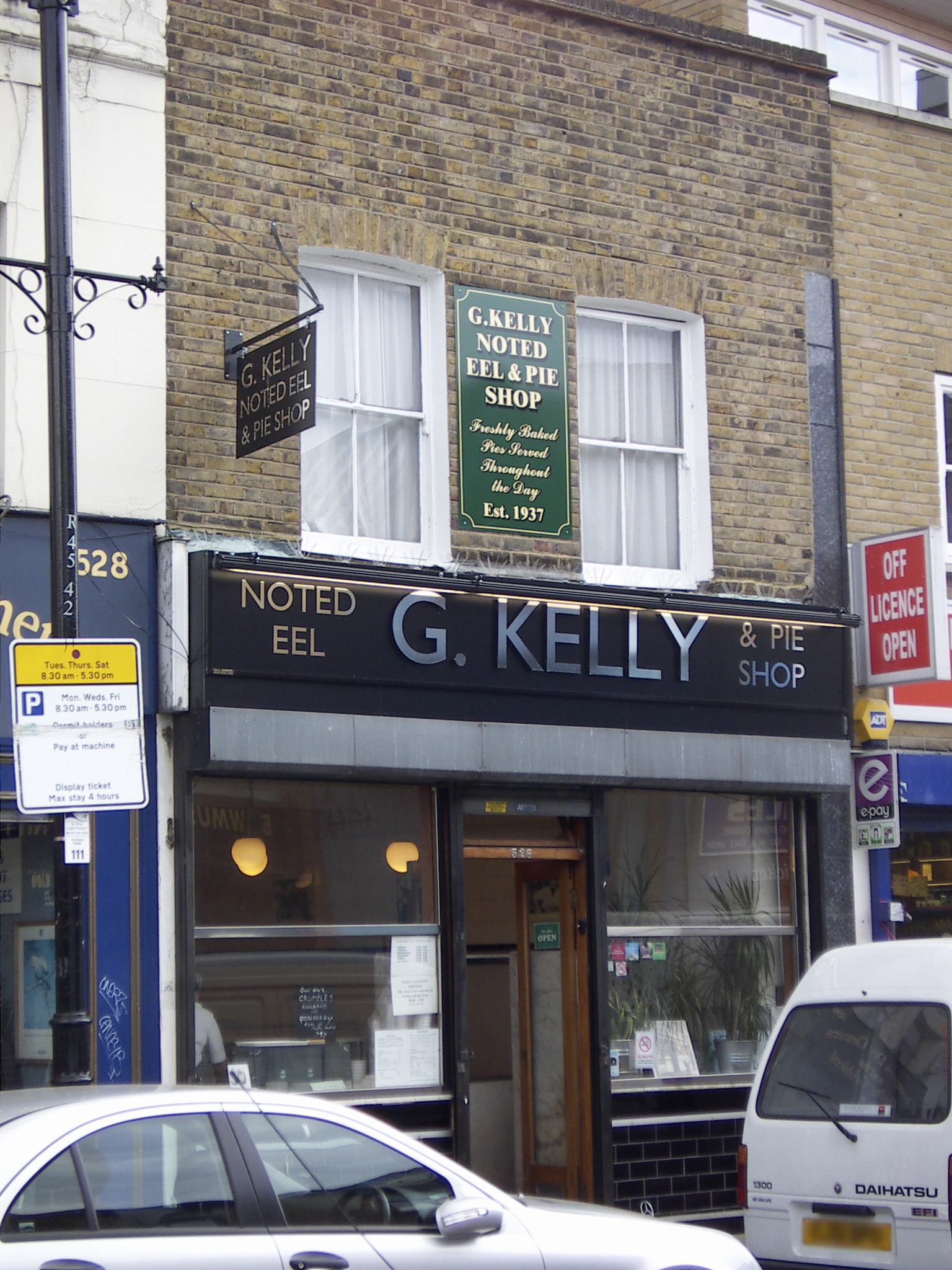
G. Kelly, Bow

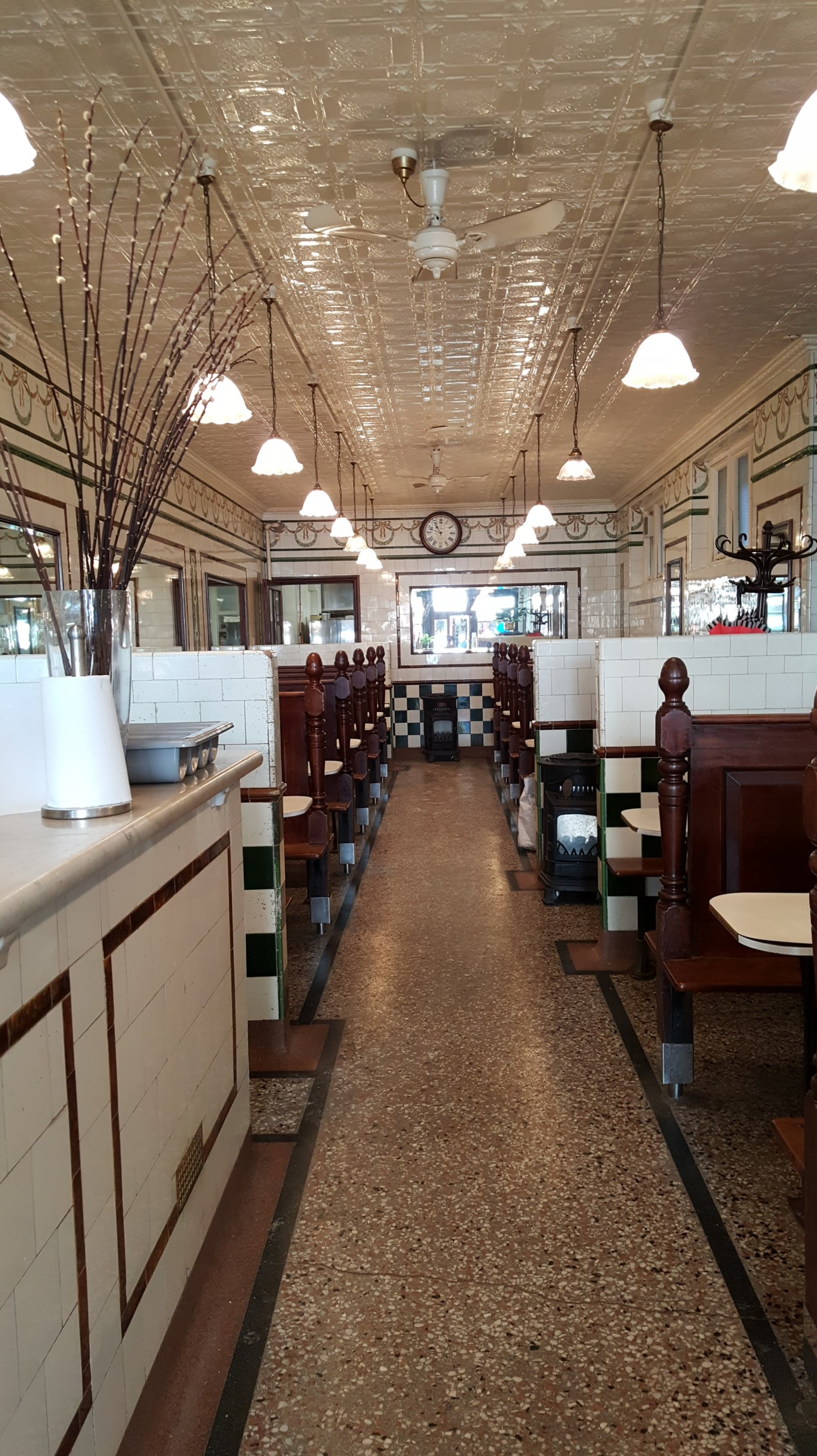
Interior of L. Manze, Walthamstow (now closed)

== 21st-century decline and current prospect ==
With the gentrification of South and East London, as well as the docklands area, significant socioeconomic and demographic changes have occurred in the London neighbourhoods traditionally most associated with pie and mash. Through the 2020s, industry experts continue to note that affluent new locals are now more interested in "lattes and paninis" than a dish typically associated with working-class Londoners.

As a result of the declining customer base, historic and famous pie and mash shops including L. Manze in Walthamstow have been forced to close, and their premises are taken over by new incumbents. In May 2023, for example, the iconic Grade II listed art-deco building at 9 Broadway Market in Hackney, which had been home to F. Cooke's pie and mash shop for the previous 120 years, was taken over by Cubitts, a company that designs and handcrafts bespoke eyewear. Five shops closed in 2025, but some new pie and mash shops have opened, including Barney's in Walthamstow (opened in 2018) and Bush (2021), in Shepherd's Bush. Some establishments only accept payment in cash.

W.J. Arments Eel and, Pie House at Walworth, founded in 1914, with its glazed tiled walls, marble table tops, opening sash windows and a floor covered with sawdust, is one of the few shops to have thrived in the changing socioeconomic climate. Some pie and mash shops have become fertile territory for social media purveyors, which can be beneficial for the profiled businesses.

Proposals have been raised in the British Parliament to declare a traditional speciality guaranteed (TSG) label for the dish. In February 2025, 15 producers settled on a standard recipe of minced beef in flaky pastry with liquor and mash to support the TSG application.

== See also ==
- Fish and chips
- Pie shop
