= Warren Zevon discography =

- Studio albums: 12
- Live albums: 3
- Compilation albums: 7
- Singles: 32

This article lists the discography of American rock singer-songwriter Warren Zevon.

== Albums ==
=== Studio albums ===
Year	Album info	Peak chart positions				Certifications
Year	Album info	US	US Ind.	AUS	UK	Certifications
1969	Wanted Dead or Alive: Released: 1969; Label: Liberty; Format: LP, CD	—	—	—	—	
1976	Warren Zevon: Released: May 18, 1976; Label: Elektra / Asylum; Format: LP, CS, CD	189	—	—	—	
1978	Excitable Boy: Released: January 18, 1978; Label: Elektra / Asylum; Format: LP, CS, CD	8	—	9	—	RIAA: Platinum; MC: Gold
1980	Bad Luck Streak in Dancing School: Released: February 15, 1980; Label: Elektra; Format: LP, CD	20	—	35	—	
1982	The Envoy: Released: July 16, 1982; Label: Rhino / Elektra; Format: LP, CD	93	—	100	—	
1987	Sentimental Hygiene: Released: August 29, 1987; Label: Virgin; Format: LP, CS, CD	63	—	42	—	
1989	Transverse City: Released: October 1989; Label: Virgin; Format: CD, CS, LP	—	—	—	—	
1991	Mr. Bad Example: Released: October 15, 1991; Label: Giant / Rhino / Warner Bros.; Format: CD, CS, LP	—	—	—	—	
1995	Mutineer: Released: May 23, 1995; Label: Giant / Giant; Format: CD	—	—	—	—	
2000	Life'll Kill Ya: Released: January 25, 2000; Label: Artemis; Format: CD	173	8	—	146	
2002	My Ride's Here: Released: May 7, 2002; Label: Artemis; Format: CD	—	22	—	—	
2003	The Wind: Released: August 26, 2003; Label: Artemis (US) / Rykodisc (UK); Format: CD, LP	12	1	—	57	
"—" denotes a recording that did not chart or was not released in that territory.

=== Live albums ===
Year	Album	US	AUS
1980	Stand in the Fire: Released: December 26, 1980; Label: Elektra / Asylum; Vivid Sound; Format: LP, CD	80	94
1993	Learning to Flinch: Released: April 13, 1993; Label: Giant / Giant; Format: CD, CS	198	—
2025	Epilogue: Live At The Edmonton Folk Festival: Released: November 28, 2025 (LP), December 5, 2025 (CD/Digital); Label: Omnivore Records; Format: LP, CD, Digital	—	—

=== Live archive releases ===
Year	Album	US	AUS
2020	Fever in My Veins (Live New Jersey '82): Released: October 27, 2020; Label: Happenstance; Format: Digital	—	—
2021	The Monkey and the Plywood Violin: Released: May 6, 2021; Label: musique de lune; Format: Digital	—	—
2022	Moving Through the Station (Live Cleveland '92): Released: February 2, 2022; Label: Routenote; Format: Digital	—	—

=== Compilation albums ===
Year	Album	US	US Ind.	Certifications
1986	A Quiet Normal Life: The Best of Warren Zevon: Released: October 24, 1986; Label: Elektra / Asylum; Format:	—	—	RIAA: Gold
1996	I'll Sleep When I'm Dead: Released: September 17, 1996; Label: Rhino; Format: CD	—	—	
2002	Genius: The Best of Warren Zevon: Released: October 2002; Label: Rhino; Format: CD	168	—	
2003	The First Sessions: Released: 2003; Label: Varèse Sarabande; Format: CD	—	—	
2006	Reconsider Me: The Love Songs: Released: January 31, 2006; Label: Artemis; Format: CD	—	—	
2007	Preludes: Rare and Unreleased Recordings: Released: May 1, 2007; Label: New West; Format: CD, digital	—	32	
2020	Greatest Hits (According to Judd Apatow): Released: October 24, 2020; Label: Rhino Entertainment; Format: LP	—	—	
"—" denotes a recording that did not chart or was not released in that territory.

== Singles ==
Year	Name	Peak chart positions						Certifications	Album
Year	Name	US	US Main	US Dance	CAN	AUS	UK	Certifications	Album
1976	"Hasten Down the Wind"	—	—	—	—	—	—		Warren Zevon
1976	"I'll Sleep When I'm Dead"	—	—	—	—	—	—		Warren Zevon
1978	"Johnny Strikes Up the Band"	—	—	—	—	—	—		Excitable Boy
1978	"Excitable Boy"	—	—	—	—	—	—		Excitable Boy
1978	"Werewolves of London"	21	—	—	18	8	87	BPI: Silver	Excitable Boy
1978	"Nighttime in the Switching Yard"	—	—	—	—	—	—		Excitable Boy
1978	"Lawyers, Guns and Money"	—	—	—	—	—	—		Excitable Boy
1980	"A Certain Girl"	57	—	—	67	—	—		Bad Luck Streak in Dancing School
1980	"Jeannie Needs a Shooter"	—	—	—	—	—	—		Bad Luck Streak in Dancing School
1980	"Gorilla, You're a Desperado"	—	—	—	—	—	—		Bad Luck Streak in Dancing School
1982	"Let Nothing Come Between You"	—	24	—	—	—	—		The Envoy
1987	"Sentimental Hygiene"	—	9	—	—	—	—		Sentimental Hygiene
1987	"Boom Boom Mancini"	—	—	—	—	—	—		Sentimental Hygiene
1987	"Reconsider Me"	—	—	—	—	—	—		Sentimental Hygiene
1987	"Detox Mansion"	—	44	—	—	—	—		Sentimental Hygiene
1987	"Bad Karma"	—	—	—	—	—	—		Sentimental Hygiene
1987	"Leave My Monkey Alone"	—	—	18	—	—	—		Sentimental Hygiene
1989	"Run Straight Down"	—	30	—	—	—	—		Transverse City
1989	"Splendid Isolation"	—	—	—	—	—	—		Transverse City
1991	"Finishing Touches"	—	—	—	—	—	—		Mr. Bad Example
1991	"Searching for a Heart"	—	—	—	—	—	—		Mr. Bad Example
1995	"Rottweiler Blues"	—	—	—	—	—	—		Mutineer
1995	"Poisonous Lookalike"	—	—	—	—	—	—		Mutineer
1995	"Mutineer"	—	—	—	—	—	—		Mutineer
2000	"I Was in the House When the House Burned Down"	—	—	—	—	—	—		Life'll Kill Ya
2000	"Porcelain Monkey"	—	—	—	—	—	—		Life'll Kill Ya
2000	"Back in the High Life Again"	—	—	—	—	—	—		Life'll Kill Ya
2002	"Basket Case"	—	—	—	—	—	—		My Ride's Here
2002	"Hit Somebody! (The Hockey Song)"	—	—	—	—	—	—		My Ride's Here
2002	"Genius"	—	—	—	—	—	—		My Ride's Here
2003	"Disorder in the House"	—	—	—	—	—	—		The Wind
2003	"Knockin' on Heaven's Door"	—	—	—	—	—	—		The Wind
"—" denotes a recording that did not chart or was not released in that territory.
