= Genius: The Best of Warren Zevon =

Greatest hits album by Warren Zevon
- Released: October 2002
- Recorded: 1975–2002
- Genre: Rock
- Length: 78:20
- Label: Rhino
- Producers: Gary Peterson; Warren Zevon

Warren Zevon chronology
My Ride's Here (2002)	Genius: The Best of Warren Zevon (2002)	The First Sessions (2003)

Professional ratings
Review scores
Source	Rating
AllMusic	4.5/5 stars
Robert Christgau	A
The Encyclopedia of Popular Music	4/5 stars
(The New) Rolling Stone Album Guide	4/5 stars

Genius: The Best of Warren Zevon is a compilation album by American musician Warren Zevon, released in 2002.

== Reception ==
Writing for AllMusic, Stephen Thomas Erlewine wrote, "Although there was the double-disc set I'll Sleep When I'm Dead and a 1986 hits collection, there was no set produced during the CD era that chronicled not just [Zevon's] heyday, but his late-1980s comeback while cherrypicking highlights from the 1990s. This does exactly that over the course of a generous, sharply selected 22 tracks. Given the space, it's inevitable that some great songs are missing."

== Track listing ==
All tracks are written by Warren Zevon.

No.	Title	Writer(s)	Origin	Length
1.	"Poor Poor Pitiful Me"		Warren Zevon, 1976	3:05
2.	"The French Inhaler"		Warren Zevon	3:46
3.	"Carmelita"		Warren Zevon	3:34
4.	"Hasten Down the Wind"		Warren Zevon	2:59
5.	"Werewolves of London"	LeRoy Marinell, Waddy Wachtel, Zevon	Excitable Boy, 1978	3:26
6.	"Roland the Headless Thompson Gunner"	David Lindell, Zevon	Excitable Boy	3:44
7.	"Excitable Boy"	Marinell, Zevon	Excitable Boy	2:39
8.	"Lawyers, Guns and Money"		Excitable Boy	3:30
9.	"Interlude No.1/Play It All Night Long"		Bad Luck Streak in Dancing School, 1980	3:17
10.	"A Certain Girl"	Allen Toussaint	Bad Luck Streak in Dancing School	3:06
11.	"Looking for the Next Best Thing"	Kenny Edwards, Marinell, Zevon	The Envoy, 1982	3:37
12.	"Detox Mansion"	Jorge Calderón, Zevon	Sentimental Hygiene, 1987	3:13
13.	"Reconsider Me" (Single Version)		Sentimental Hygiene	3:26
14.	"Boom Boom Mancini"		Sentimental Hygiene	4:48
15.	"Splendid Isolation"		Transverse City, 1989	4:28
16.	"Raspberry Beret" (Hindu Love Gods)	Prince	Hindu Love Gods, 1990	3:53
17.	"Searching for a Heart"		Mr. Bad Example, 1991	4:16
18.	"Things to Do in Denver When You're Dead"	Marinell, Wachtel, Zevon	Mr. Bad Example	2:52
19.	"Mr. Bad Example"	Calderón, Zevon	Mr. Bad Example	3:21
20.	"Mutineer"		Mutineer, 1995	3:16
21.	"I Was in the House When the House Burned Down"		Life'll Kill Ya, 2000	3:03
22.	"Genius"	Larry Klein, Zevon	My Ride's Here, 2002	5:01

== Personnel ==
- Warren Zevon – synthesizer, harmonica, piano, keyboards, electric piano, vocals, synthesizer strings
- Bill Berry – drums
- Charlie Bisharat – violin
- Roy Bittan – piano
- Jackson Browne – harmony vocals
- Peter Buck – guitar
- Lindsey Buckingham – harmony vocals
- Linda Ronstadt – harmony vocals
- Rosemary Butler – harmony vocals
- Jorge Calderón – bass guitar, guitar, harmony vocals
- Mike Campbell – guitar
- Larry Corbett – cello
- Joel Derouin – violin
- Kenny Edwards – harmony vocals
- Don Felder – guitar
- Anton Fig – drums
- Mick Fleetwood – drums
- Glenn Frey – rhythm guitar, harmony vocals
- Bob Glaub – bass
- Richard Hayward – drums
- Don Henley – harmony vocals
- Jim Horn – saxophone
- Jim Keltner – drums
- Bobby Keyes – saxophone
- Larry Klein – bass
- Craig Krampf – drums
- Russ Kunkel – drums
- Kipp Lennon – harmony vocals
- Mark Lennon – harmony vocals
- Michael Lennon – harmony vocals
- David Lindley – fiddle, guitar, slide guitar, lap steel guitar
- Rick Marotta – drums, harmony vocals
- John McVie – bass
- Mike Mills – bass
- Graham Nash – harmony vocals
- Jeff Porcaro – drums
- The Sid Sharp Strings – strings
- Leland Sklar – bass
- JD Souther – harmony vocals
- Benmont Tench – organ
- Waddy Wachtel – guitar, harmony vocals, 12-string acoustic guitar
- Jennifer Warnes – harmony vocals
- Winston Watson – drums
- Evan Wilson – viola
- Jai Winding – piano
- Neil Young – harmony vocals
- Larry Zack – drums
- Jordan Zevon – harmony vocals

Technical

- Warren Zevon – compilation producer, producer, mixing, string arrangements, art direction, phtogoraphy
- Gary Peterson – compilation producer
- Duncan Aldrich – producer, engineer, mixing
- Niko Bolas – producer, engineer
- Jackson Browne – producer
- Paul Q. Kolderie – producer, engineer
- Greg Ladanyi – producer, engineer, mixing
- Sean Slade – producer, engineer
- Andrew Slater – producer
- Waddy Wachtel – producer
- Richard Bosworth – engineer
- Matt Chiaravasll – engineer
- John Cutler – engineer
- Michael Delugg – engineer
- Marc DeSisto – engineer
- John Haeny – engineer
- Andy Jackson – engineer
- Rob Jacobs – engineer, mixing
- Dennis Kirk – engineer, mixing
- Richard Landers – engineer
- Michael McDonald – engineer
- Tim Mulligan – engineer
- Kent Nebergall – engineer
- Jim Nipar – engineer
- Fritz Richmond – engineer
- Rail Jon Rogut – engineer
- Will Schillinger – engineer
- Noah Scot Snyder – engineer, mixing
- Bob Vogt – engineer
- Rob Jaczko – mixing
- John Beverly Jones – mixing
- Shelly Yakus – mixing
- Teresa Caffin – remastering
- Bill Inglot – remastering
- Mike Engstrom – product manager
- Randy Perry – project assistant
- Hugh Brown – art direction and design, photography
- Bryan Lasley – design
- John Austin – licensing
- Cory Frye – editorial supervision
- Tim Scanlin – liner notes coordination
- William Lee Self – liner notes

== Charts ==
Chart (2003)	Position
US Billboard 200	168
US Top Internet Albums	168
