= I'll Sleep When I'm Dead (An Anthology) =

I’ll Sleep When I'm Dead (An Anthology)

Compilation album by Warren Zevon
- Released: September 17, 1996
- Recorded: 1975–1995
- Genre: Rock
- Length: 2:32:10
- Label: Rhino
- Producers: Gary Peterson; Mark Pinkus

Warren Zevon chronology
Mutineer (1995)	I’ll Sleep When I'm Dead (An Anthology) (1996)	Life'll Kill Ya (2000)

Professional ratings
Review scores
Source	Rating
AllMusic	4.5/5 stars
Robert Christgau	A−
Encyclopedia of Popular Music	5/5 stars
The New Rolling Stone Album Guide (2004)	4.5/5 stars

I'll Sleep When I'm Dead (An Anthology) is a two-disc compilation album by American singer-songwriter Warren Zevon, released on Rhino Records in 1996. It spans his career from his eponymous debut album on Asylum Records to date of release, ignoring his disowned initial album from 1969, Wanted Dead or Alive. It contains tracks from all ten of his albums released during this period, and includes contributions to soundtracks and his one-off album with members of R.E.M., Hindu Love Gods.

Disc one collects recordings done for Asylum, and disc two collects recordings done for Virgin and Giant Records.

== Track listing ==
=== Disc one ===
No.	Title	Writer(s)	Album, Year	Length
1.	"Frank and Jesse James"	Warren Zevon	Warren Zevon, 1976	4:36
2.	"Hasten Down the Wind"	Warren Zevon	Warren Zevon, 1976	3:01
3.	"Poor Poor Pitiful Me"	Warren Zevon	Warren Zevon, 1976	3:06
4.	"I’ll Sleep When I’m Dead"	Warren Zevon	Warren Zevon, 1976	2:58
5.	"Carmelita"	Warren Zevon	Warren Zevon, 1976	3:35
6.	"Desperados Under the Eaves"	Warren Zevon	Warren Zevon, 1976	4:47
7.	"Johnny Strikes Up the Band"	Warren Zevon	Excitable Boy, 1978	2:49
8.	"Roland the Headless Thompson Gunner"	David Lindell, Warren Zevon	Excitable Boy, 1978	3:45
9.	"Excitable Boy"	LeRoy Marinell, Warren Zevon	Excitable Boy, 1978	2:41
10.	"Werewolves of London"	LeRoy Marinell, Waddy Wachtel, Warren Zevon	Excitable Boy, 1978	3:28
11.	"Accidentally like a Martyr"	Warren Zevon	Excitable Boy, 1978	3:38
12.	"Lawyers, Guns and Money"	Warren Zevon	Excitable Boy, 1978	3:32
13.	"Frozen Notes"	Warren Zevon	Excitable Boy Previously Unissued Outtake, 1978	2:01
14.	"Bad Luck Streak in Dancing School"	Warren Zevon	Bad Luck Streak in Dancing School, 1980	2:59
15.	"Gorilla, You’re a Desperado"	Warren Zevon	Bad Luck Streak in Dancing School, 1980	2:47
16.	"Play It All Night Long"	Warren Zevon	Bad Luck Streak in Dancing School, 1980	3:18
17.	"Mohammed's Radio" (Live)	Warren Zevon	Stand in the Fire, 1980	4:49
18.	"Jeannie Needs a Shooter" (Live)	Bruce Springsteen, Warren Zevon	Stand in the Fire, 1980	4:07
19.	"The Envoy"	Warren Zevon	The Envoy, 1982	3:13
20.	"The Hula Hula Boys"	Warren Zevon	The Envoy, 1982	3:02
21.	"Let Nothing Come between You"	Warren Zevon	The Envoy, 1982	3:39
22.	"Looking for the Next Best Thing"	Kenny Edwards, LeRoy Marinell, Warren Zevon	The Envoy, 1982	3:38
Total length:				1:15:20

=== Disc two ===
No.	Title	Writer(s)	Album, Year	Length
1.	"Sentimental Hygiene"	Warren Zevon	Sentimental Hygiene, 1987	5:03
2.	"Boom Boom Mancini"	Warren Zevon	Sentimental Hygiene, 1987	4:49
3.	"Detox Mansion"	Jorge Calderón, Warren Zevon	Sentimental Hygiene, 1987	3:13
4.	"Bad Karma"	Warren Zevon	Sentimental Hygiene, 1987	3:13
5.	"Reconsider Me" (Single Version)	Warren Zevon	Sentimental Hygiene, 1987	3:26
6.	"Run Straight Down"	Warren Zevon	Transverse City, 1989	4:06
7.	"The Long Arm of the Law"	Warren Zevon	Transverse City, 1989	3:46
8.	"Splendid Isolation"	Warren Zevon	Transverse City, 1989	4:30
9.	"You Don't Know What Love Is" (with Mark Isham)	Gene de Paul, Don Raye	From the Motion Picture Love at Large, 1989	2:30
10.	"Raspberry Beret" (by Hindu Love Gods)	Prince Rogers Nelson	Hindu Love Gods, 1990	3:54
11.	"Suzie Lightning"	Warren Zevon	Mr. Bad Example, 1991	4:05
12.	"Things to Do in Denver When You're Dead"	LeRoy Marinell, Waddy Wachtel, Warren Zevon	Mr. Bad Example, 1991	2:53
13.	"Searching for a Heart"	Warren Zevon	Mr. Bad Example, 1991	4:18
14.	"Mr. Bad Example"	Jorge Calderón, Warren Zevon	Mr. Bad Example, 1991	3:22
15.	"Roll with the Punches"	Warren Zevon	From the Television Production Tales from the Crypt, 1992	2:24
16.	"The French Inhaler" (Live)	Warren Zevon	Learning to Flinch, 1993	4:21
17.	"The Indifference of Heaven" (Live)	Warren Zevon	Learning to Flinch, 1993	4:14
18.	"If You Won't Leave Me I’ll Find Somebody Who Will"	Warren Zevon	From the Television Production Route 66, 1993	0:43
19.	"Real or Not"	Warren Zevon	From the Television Production Tek Wars, 1994	1:45
20.	"Seminole Bingo"	Carl Hiaasen, Warren Zevon	Mutineer, 1995	3:12
21.	"Monkey Wash Donkey Rinse"	Duncan Aldrich, Warren Zevon	Mutineer, 1995	3:55
22.	"Mutineer"	Warren Zevon	Mutineer, 1995	3:17
Total length:				1:16:50

== Collective personnel ==
- Warren Zevon – vocals, piano, organ, synthesizer, keyboards, guitars, harmonicapercussion
- David Lindley – banjo, fiddle, guitars, slide-guitar, lap steel guitar, saz
- Glenn Frey, Cain Sharp, Waddy Wachtel, Neil Young, Zeke Zirngiebel – guitars, backing vocals
- Peter Buck, Mike Campbell, Denny Dias, David Gilmour, David Landau, Steve Lukather, Peter Maunu – guitars
- Darius Degher – sitar
- Bob Harris – keyboards, backing vocals
- Chick Corea, Lois Griffin, Roy Bittan – piano
- Benmont Tench – organ
- Jai Winding – piano, keyboards, backing vocals
- Bob Glaub – bass guitar, keyboards
- Jorge Calderon, Kenny Edwards, Roberto Pinon – bass, backing vocals
- Skittles Cat, Larry Klein, Tony Levin, LeRoy Marinell, John McVie, Mike Mills, Leland Sklar – bass
- Bill Berry, Stanley Cat, Mick Fleetwood, Richie Hayward, Jim Keltner, Danny Kortchmar, Craig Krampf, Russ Kunkel, Gary Mallaber, Rick Marotta, Jeff Porcaro, Marty Stinger, Kurt Wortman, Larry Zack – drums, percussion
- Karla Bonoff, Jackson Browne, Lindsey Buckingham, Rosemary Butler, Darcy DeMoss, Phil Everly, Don Henley, Billy Hinsche, Kipp Lennon, Mark Lennon, Michael Lennon, Stan Lynch, Belinda Montgomery, Graham Nash, Patricia Richardson, Linda Ronstadt, JD Souther, Michael Stipe, Jennifer Warnes, Jordan Zevon – backing vocals
- Charles Veal, Ken Yerke – violins
- Carole Mukogawa – viola
- Dennis Karmazyn – cello
- Mark Isham – trumpet, electronic sounds
- Jim Horn – saxophones, recorder
- Bobby Keys – saxophones
- Bruce Hornsby – accordion
- Fritz Richmond – jug

=== Production ===
- Gary Peterson, Mark Pinkus – compilation producers
- Warren Zevon, Duncan Aldrich, Niko Bolas, Jackson Browne, Bill Inglot, Mark Isham, Greg Ladanyi, Andrew Slater, Waddy Wachtel – original recordings producers
- Duncan Aldrich, Niko Bolas, Richard Bosworth, Marc DeSisto, Dennis Kirk, Steve Krause, Nathaniel Kunkel, Greg Ladanyi, Richard Landers, Peggy McAfee, Kent Nebergall, Jim Nipar, Fritz Richmond, Rail Jon Rogut, Bob Vogt, Billy Youdelman – engineers
- Duncan Aldrich, Niko Bolas, John Haeny, Rob Jacobs, Rob Jaczko, John Beverly Jones, Dennis Kirk, Greg Ladanyi, Shelly Yakus – mixing engineers
- Bill Inglot, Geoff Sykes – remastering engineers
- Carl Wilson – vocal arrangements on "Desperados Under the Eaves"
- Monster X, Coco Shinomiya – art direction and design
- Duncan Aldrich, Roger Bell, Gloria Boyce, Henry Diltz, Jonathan Exley, George Gruel, Michael Ochs, Aaron Rapoport, Randee Saint Nicholas, Jon Sievert, Lorrie Sullivan, Scott Weiner, Serenus Zeitblom, Crystal Zevon – photography
- Joey Helguera – tape research
