= A Quiet Normal Life: The Best of Warren Zevon =

Greatest hits album by Warren Zevon
- Released: October 24, 1986
- Recorded: 1975–1982
- Genre: Rock
- Length: 46:59
- Label: Elektra
- Producer: Warren Zevon, Jackson Browne, Waddy Wachtel, Greg Ladanyi

Warren Zevon chronology
The Envoy (1982)	A Quiet Normal Life: The Best of Warren Zevon (1986)	Sentimental Hygiene (1987)

A Quiet Normal Life: The Best Of Warren Zevon is a greatest hits album by American musician Warren Zevon released in 1986.

This compilation covers Zevon's four studio albums with Asylum Records. It was mastered by Barry Diament.

== Reception ==
Professional ratings
Review scores
Source	Rating
Allmusic	4.5/5 stars
Encyclopedia of Popular Music	3/5 stars
Q	4/5 stars

== Track listing ==
All songs written by Warren Zevon unless otherwise indicated.

1. "Werewolves of London" (LeRoy Marinell, Waddy Wachtel, Zevon) (from Excitable Boy, 1978) – 3:29
2. "Excitable Boy" (Marinell, Zevon) (from Excitable Boy, 1978) – 2:39
3. "Play It All Night Long" (from Bad Luck Streak in Dancing School, 1980) – 2:50
4. "Roland the Headless Thompson Gunner" (David Lindell, Zevon) (from Excitable Boy, 1978) – 3:47
5. "The Envoy" (from The Envoy, 1982) – 3:12
6. "Mohammed's Radio" (from Warren Zevon, 1976) – 3:41
7. "Desperados Under the Eaves" (from Warren Zevon, 1976) – 4:45
8. "Johnny Strikes Up the Band" (from Excitable Boy, 1978) – 2:48
9. "I'll Sleep When I'm Dead" (from Warren Zevon, 1976) – 2:56
10. "Lawyers, Guns and Money (Radio edit)" (single, 1978) – 2:56
11. "Ain't That Pretty at All" (Marinell, Zevon) (from The Envoy, 1982) – 3:34
12. "Poor Poor Pitiful Me" (from Warren Zevon, 1976) – 3:04
13. "Accidentally Like a Martyr" (from Excitable Boy, 1978) – 3:39
14. "Looking for the Next Best Thing" (Kenny Edwards, Marinell, Zevon) (from The Envoy, 1982) – 3:39

== Certifications ==
Organization	Level	Date
RIAA – U.S.	Gold	December 4, 1998
