= Stand in the Fire =

Live album by Warren Zevon
- Released: December 26, 1980
- Recorded: August 1980
- Venues: The Roxy Theatre, Los Angeles
- Genre: Rock
- Length: 42:37
- Label: Asylum
- Producers: Warren Zevon; Greg Ladanyi

Warren Zevon chronology
Bad Luck Streak in Dancing School (1980)	Stand in the Fire (1980)	The Envoy (1982)

Professional ratings
Review scores
Source	Rating
Allmusic	4/5 stars
Robert Christgau	A−
Encyclopedia of Popular Music	4/5 stars
Music Box	5/5 stars

Stand in the Fire is a live album by American singer-songwriter Warren Zevon, released December 26, 1980. It was recorded in August 1980 during a five-night residency at The Roxy Theatre in West Hollywood, California, and featured two new original songs ("Stand in the Fire" and "The Sin") and one new cover ("Bo Diddley's a Gunslinger"). The album was dedicated to Martin Scorsese.

It was released in a limited edition, LP-replica sleeve on CD April 25, 2006, in Japan. A remastered and expanded edition (four additional tracks) was released on March 26, 2007 in the U.K. and March 27, 2007, in the U.S. A deluxe vinyl edition, expanded to a 2-LP set that includes 10 bonus tracks—4 songs previously unavailable on vinyl and 6 songs previously unreleased on any format (that is, 20 tracks in total) was released via Rhino Records on April 2, 2021.

Band members Zeke Zirngiebel, Bob Harris and Marty Stinger were in Boulder, a band signed to Elektra Records. The singer was Stan Bush. Their self-titled album was released in 1979 and it included Zevon's "Join Me in L.A." Bob Harris later went on to work with Frank Zappa.

Zevon called the concerts "The Dog Ate the Part We Didn't Like Tour".

== Track listing ==
All songs written by Warren Zevon unless otherwise indicated.

Side one

1. "Stand in the Fire" – 3:26
2. "Jeannie Needs a Shooter" (Bruce Springsteen, Zevon) – 4:00
3. "Excitable Boy" (LeRoy Marinell, Zevon) – 3:52
4. "Mohammed's Radio" – 4:45
5. "Werewolves of London" (LeRoy Marinell, Waddy Wachtel, Zevon) – 4:48

Side two

1. "Lawyers, Guns and Money" – 3:49
2. "The Sin" – 3:06
3. "Poor Poor Pitiful Me" – 4:08
4. "I'll Sleep When I'm Dead" – 4:28
5. "Bo Diddley's a Gunslinger" / "Bo Diddley" (Bo Diddley) – 4:15

=== Bonus Tracks on 2007 Remastered Edition ===
1. "Johnny Strikes Up the Band" – 3:58
2. "Play It All Night Long" – 4:50
3. "Frank and Jesse James" – 4:27
4. "Hasten Down the Wind" – 4:33

=== Deluxe 2-LP version, released 2 April 2021 ===
1. "Stand in the Fire"
2. "Jeannie Needs a Shooter"
3. "Excitable Boy"
4. "Mohammed’s Radio"
5. "Werewolves of London"
6. "Lawyers, Guns and Money"
7. "The Sin"
8. "Poor Poor Pitiful Me"
9. "I’ll Sleep When I’m Dead"
10. "Bo Diddley’s a Gunslinger/Bo Diddley"
11. "Johnny Strikes Up the Band"
12. "Roland The Headless Thompson Gunner"
13. "Play It All Night Long"
14. "Night Time in the Switching Yard"
15. "Gorilla You’re a Desperado"
16. "Bad Luck Streak in Dancing School"
17. "The Sin" (alternate slightly longer version)
18. "Frank and Jesse James"
19. "Hasten Down The Wind"
20. "A Certain Girl"

== Personnel ==
- Warren Zevon – Lead vocals, bass, guitar, piano, keyboards, 12-string guitar
- David Landau – lead guitar
- Zeke Zirngiebel – guitar, electric guitar, rhythm guitar, steel guitar, vocals, 12-string guitar
- Bob Harris – synthesizer, piano, backing vocals
- Roberto Piñón – bass, backing vocals
- Marty Stinger – drums

Technical

- George Gruel – road manager
- Jimmy Wachtel, Michael Curtis – art direction, photography
- Recorded by Billy Youdelman and Greg Ladanyi
- Mixed by Greg Ladanyi, assisted by James Ledner

== Charts ==
Chart (1980/81)	Position
United States (Billboard 200)	80
Australia (Kent Music Report)	94
