= Living in the USA =

Studio album by Linda Ronstadt
- Released: September 19, 1978
- Recorded: May 5 – July 3, 1978
- Studio: Sound Factory (Hollywood)
- Genre: Rock
- Length: 35:06
- Labels: Asylum, Rhino
- Producer: Peter Asher

Linda Ronstadt chronology
Simple Dreams (1977)	Living in the USA (1978)	Mad Love (1980)

Singles from Living in the USA
- 1. "Back in the U.S.A." Released: August 1978; 2. "Ooh Baby Baby" Released: November 1978; 3. "Just One Look" Released: February 1979; 4. "Love Me Tender" Released: February 1979; 5. "Alison" Released: April 1979

Living in the USA is the ninth studio album by American singer Linda Ronstadt, released in 1978. The album was Ronstadt's third and final No. 1 on the Billboard 200 album chart.

== Release ==
The album was originally released by Asylum in the LP, 8-track & cassette format in September 1978 (catalog numbers 6E-155, TC8-155 or TC5-155). Subsequently, in 1990, Asylum released the album in the CD format (2-155).

In addition to the standard 1978 release, collector's-item editions of the LP were made in the same time period of the album in red vinyl (catalog number K53085) and also of a picture disc (catalog number DP 401) featuring a photograph of Ronstadt lacing up the roller skating boots that she is wearing on the front cover (this photograph is also included on the record sleeve in the standard release).

== Single releases and radio play ==
The album's first single release was Chuck Berry's "Back in the USA" which reached number 11 on the Cash Box Top 100 and number 16 on the Billboard Hot 100. (It was listed at number 1 on many Album Rock playlists.) The disc's biggest success was Ronstadt's version of Smokey Robinson's "Ooh Baby Baby" (featuring alto-sax work from David Sanborn) that hit number 7 Pop and number 2 Easy Listening as well as the Country and even the Soul chart. "Just One Look" and "Alison" later became hit singles for Ronstadt as well, while "All That You Dream" and Warren Zevon's "Mohammed's Radio" were popular tracks on album-oriented rock stations.

Although not released as a single, Ronstadt's version of "Love Me Tender" was edited together with the original version of the song by Elvis Presley, creating a duet between the two famous singers that was played by many radio stations at the time.

== Critical reception ==
Professional ratings
Review scores
Source	Rating
AllMusic	3/5 stars
Christgau's Record Guide	B
Circus	4/5 stars
Crawdaddy!	3.5/5 stars
The Rolling Stone Album Guide	3/5 stars

The album received largely positive reviews at the time of release. Ronstadt covered her last Warren Zevon song for this album ("Mohammed's Radio"). The album largely consisted of material that had previously been recorded and released by other artists including covers of songs written and performed previously by Little Feat, Elvis Presley and Elvis Costello.

At the time, Ronstadt's cover of Elvis Costello's "Alison" was criticized by Costello himself after he heard her version of the song, although he did admit he "liked the money." Ronstadt had her management reach out to Costello and ask if he had any other material she could cover. He responded by sending her three songs that she recorded for her follow-up album. After the release of Mad Love, Ronstadt's follow-up album with the three Costello songs she solicited, Costello again had negative comments about her versions of his songs. In later years, Costello praised Ronstadt and apologized for the harshness of his comments.

== Track listing ==
Side one
No.	Title	Writer(s)	Length
1.	"Back in the U.S.A."	Chuck Berry	3:02
2.	"When I Grow Too Old to Dream"	Oscar Hammerstein II, Sigmund Romberg	3:52
3.	"Just One Look"	Gregory Carroll, Doris Payne	3:20
4.	"Alison"	Elvis Costello	3:20
5.	"White Rhythm & Blues"	JD Souther	4:17

Side two
No.	Title	Writer(s)	Length
1.	"All That You Dream"	Paul Barrere, Bill Payne	3:43
2.	"Ooh Baby Baby"	William Robinson, Warren Moore	3:18
3.	"Mohammed's Radio"	Warren Zevon	4:20
4.	"Blowing Away"	Eric Kaz	3:15
5.	"Love Me Tender"	Elvis Presley, Vera Matson	2:39
Total length:			35:06

== Personnel ==
- Linda Ronstadt – lead vocals, backing vocals (3, 5, 9)
- Don Grolnick – acoustic piano (1–3, 5, 7–9) electric piano (4–6), organ (5, 10)
- Dan Dugmore – electric guitar (1, 3, 7) pedal steel guitar (4–6, 8–9)
- Waddy Wachtel – electric guitar (1, 3–8), backing vocals (1, 6, 10), acoustic guitar (9, 10)
- Kenny Edwards – bass guitar (1, 3–9), backing vocals (1, 3, 9)
- Russ Kunkel – drums (1, 3–9), congas (5, 9)
- Mike Mainieri – vibraphone (2), arrangements (2)
- Peter Asher – backing vocals (1), cowbell (3, 9), tambourine (3, 6, 9), shaker (6), sleigh bells (6)
- David Sanborn – alto saxophone (4, 7)
- Pat Henderson – backing vocals (3, 8)
- Sherlie Matthews – backing vocals (3, 8)
- Andrew Gold – backing vocals (4)
- Jim Gilstrap – backing vocals (7)
- John Lehman – backing vocals (7)
- David Lasley – backing vocals (9)
- Arnold McCuller – backing vocals (9)

=== Production ===
- Peter Asher – producer
- Val Garay – recording, mixing
- George Ybarra – recording assistant, mix assistant
- Jan Michael Alejandro – technician
- Harold Jones – technician
- Doug Sax – mastering at The Mastering Lab (Hollywood, California).
- Kosh – art direction, design
- Jim Shea – photography

== Charts ==
=== Weekly charts ===
Chart (1978–79)	Peak position
Australia (Kent Music Report)	3
Canadian Albums Chart	9
Dutch Albums Chart	19
French SNEP Albums Chart	19
Japanese Oricon LPs Chart	23
New Zealand Albums Chart	3
Swedish Albums Chart	37
UK Albums Chart	39
U.S. Billboard Pop Albums	1
U.S. Billboard Country Albums	3

=== Year-end charts ===
Chart (1978)	Position
Australian Albums Chart	23
Canadian Albums Chart	79
New Zealand Albums (RMNZ)	29

Chart (1979)	Position
U.S. Billboard Pop Albums	41

== Certifications ==
Region	Certification	Certified units/sales
Australia (ARIA)	2× Platinum	140,000^{^}
Hong Kong (IFPI Hong Kong)	Gold	10,000^{*}
Japan	—	84,380
New Zealand (RMNZ)	Platinum	15,000^{^}
United Kingdom (BPI)	Silver	60,000^{^}
United States (RIAA)	2× Platinum	2,000,000^{^}
^{*} Sales figures based on certification alone.^{^} Shipments figures based on certification alone.

== Release history ==
Release history and formats for Living in the USA
Region	Date	Format	Label	Ref.
North America	September 6, 1977	LP; cassette	Asylum Records	
