= Life'll Kill Ya =

2000 studio album by Warren Zevon

Studio album by Warren Zevon
- Released: January 25, 2000
- Recorded: 1999
- Studios: Anatomy of a Headache, Los Angeles; Fort Apache Studios, Cambridge; Magic Shop, New York City
- Genre: Rock
- Length: 40:23
- Label: Artemis
- Producers: Paul Q. Kolderie, Sean Slade

Warren Zevon chronology
I'll Sleep When I'm Dead (An Anthology) (1996)	Life'll Kill Ya (2000)	My Ride's Here (2002)

Singles from Life'll Kill Ya
- 1. "I Was in the House When the House Burned Down" Released: 2000; 2. "Porcelain Monkey" Released: 2000; 3. "Back in the High Life Again" Released: 2000

Professional ratings
Review scores
Source	Rating
AllMusic	3.5/5 stars
The Encyclopedia of Popular Music	4/5 stars
Rolling Stone	3.5/5 stars
The New Rolling Stone Album Guide	4.5/5 stars
Uncut	8/10

Life'll Kill Ya is the tenth studio album by American singer-songwriter Warren Zevon. The album was released on January 25, 2000, by Artemis Records. It was later hailed in Rolling Stone as his best work since Excitable Boy.

== Themes ==
Several of the album's songs deal with the topic of death; for instance, "My Shit's Fucked Up" is a mournful lament on the aging process and the inevitable decay that accompanies it. "Life'll Kill Ya" and "Don't Let Us Get Sick" also have prominent death themes. Additionally, Zevon had a phobia of doctors leading him to avoid them for several years; that theme is included in the album as well. In 2002, just two years after the album's release, Zevon was diagnosed with mesothelioma and died a year later.

"Porcelain Monkey" is a meditation on the death of Elvis Presley, borrowing its title from a figurine on display at Graceland. Zevon often expressed a disinterest in Elvis' fame and some resentment towards how Elvis' death overshadowed that of Robert Lowell (Zevon had previously explored the topic of Elvis' death on "Jesus Mentioned" from 1982's The Envoy). A mocking laugh in "Porcelain Monkey" references Wynonie Harris, an early rock pioneer often seen as influencing Elvis, and Zevon would state he believed Bob Dylan was more deserving of the accolades Elvis had received. In an interview on the song Zevon stated: "We're in a world that objects so strenuously to pop culture. Sure, Elvis is fine, so what's wrong with Ricky Martin? He can dance. I guess Elvis danced. He choreographed himself. What's the difference? I think Ricky Martin is fine, too. Who's buying Ricky Martin and Backstreet Boy records? Ten-year-olds. And 50-year-old intellectuals weren't buying Elvis Presley in 1957. Ten-year-olds were."

== Track listing ==
All tracks are written by Warren Zevon unless noted.

No.	Title	Writer(s)	Length
1.	"I Was in the House When the House Burned Down"		3:04
2.	"Life'll Kill Ya"		2:47
3.	"Porcelain Monkey"	Jorge Calderón, Zevon	3:32
4.	"For My Next Trick I'll Need a Volunteer"		3:13
5.	"I'll Slow You Down"		3:13
6.	"Hostage-O"		4:05
7.	"Dirty Little Religion"		3:11
8.	"Back in the High Life Again"	Will Jennings, Steve Winwood	3:13
9.	"My Shit's Fucked Up"		2:45
10.	"Fistful of Rain"	Jorge Calderón, Zevon	5:19
11.	"Ourselves to Know"		3:18
12.	"Don't Let Us Get Sick"		3:05

Note

- On some releases, track 9 is omitted from the rear U-card but appears on the song list in the case booklet.

== Personnel ==
- Warren Zevon – percussion, keyboards, guitar, piccolo, vocals, penny whistle, harmonica; theremin on "Porcelain Monkey"
- Jorge Calderón – bass guitar, percussion, vocals
- Dennis Collins – vocals on "Fistful of Rain"
- Babi Floyd – vocals on "Fistful of Rain"
- Curtis King – vocals on "Fistful of Rain"
- Chuck Prophet – guitar on "For My Next Trick I'll Need a Volunteer"
- Jim Ryan – mandolin on "Ourselves to Know"
- Winston Watson – percussion, snare drums

Production

- Paul Q. Kolderie – producer, engineer
- Sean Slade – producer, engineer
- Greg Calbi – mastering
- Michael Krumper – A&R
- Warren Zevon – art direction
- Jonathan Exley – photography, design

== Charts ==
Chart (2000)	Peak position
US Billboard 200	173
US Independent Albums (Billboard)	8
