= Mutineer (album) =

Studio album by Warren Zevon
- Released: May 23, 1995
- Recorded: 1994–95
- Studios: Anatomy of a Headache, Los Angeles
- Genre: Rock
- Length: 35:37
- Label: Giant
- Producer: Warren Zevon

Warren Zevon chronology
Learning to Flinch (1993)	Mutineer (1995)	I'll Sleep When I'm Dead (An Anthology) (1996)

Singles from Mutineer
- 1. "Rottweiler Blues" Released: 1995; 2. "Poisonous Lookalike" Released: 1995; 3. "Mutineer" Released: 1995

Mutineer is the ninth studio album by American singer-songwriter Warren Zevon. The album was released on May 23, 1995, by Giant. The album largely consisted of home recordings. The album (along with the first North American vinyl release of Mr. Bad Example and first pressing of Learning to Flinch) would receive its first vinyl pressing for Record Store Day 2025 as part of the box set "Warren Zevon Piano Fighter: The Giant Years" and a standalone release later that year.

== Reception ==
Professional ratings
Review scores
Source	Rating
AllMusic	2.5/5 stars
Encyclopedia of Popular Music	3/5 stars
Uncut	7/10

In a review for AllMusic, Mark Deming would note the album consisted of strong material such as the lyrics of "Indifference of Heaven" and "Seminole Bingo" and praising the cover of "Jesus Was a Cross Maker," but ultimately criticized the mostly solo effort of the album as lacking enthusiasm stating "it's hard to blame an A&R man for not seeing a lot of promise in the guy after listening to this." Warren's son Jordan Zevon would later recount a frustration with the stripped-back synth focus of the album saying it sounded like "demos", having argued to his father his music would have benefitted from a full band arrangement and that he knew musicians who would play with Warren "for free." In 2025 at a Warren Zevon tribute show, Jordan Zevon would perform "Monkey Wash, Donkey Rinse" with a full backing band supporting the vocal track ripped from Warren's original recording which Jordan described as “We’re gonna do a little posthumous ‘I told you so.’ And hopefully in the afterlife, I’ll be all right."

"The Indifference of Heaven" is seen as a response to the 1992 Los Angeles riots, the lyrics opening on a scene describing an act of violence at a 7-Eleven during the event, with Zevon writing the song and beginning to perform it live shortly after the riots (as seen on Learning to Flinch). Journalist James Campion would argue the references to Billy Joel and Bruce Springsteen (a close friend of Zevon) in the lyrics were indictments of how wealth and fame shielded people from the harsh realities of violence, poverty and racial tensions that were present in Los Angeles at the time.

Bob Dylan covered "Mutineer" a number of times in concert after Zevon's passing. A cover version plays over the credits of "Otherwise", the finale of Futurama season nine.

== Track listing ==
All tracks composed by Warren Zevon, except where indicated.

Side one
No.	Title	Writer(s)	Length
1.	"Seminole Bingo"	Carl Hiaasen, Warren Zevon	3:10
2.	"Something Bad Happened to a Clown"		4:25
3.	"Similar to Rain"		3:26
4.	"The Indifference of Heaven"		4:03
5.	"Jesus Was a Cross Maker"	Judee Sill	1:55

Side two
No.	Title	Writer(s)	Length
6.	"Poisonous Lookalike"		4:14
7.	"Piano Fighter"		3:52
8.	"Rottweiler Blues"	Carl Hiaasen, Zevon	3:15
9.	"Monkey Wash Donkey Rinse"	Duncan Aldrich, Zevon	3:52
10.	"Mutineer"		3:15

== Personnel ==
- Warren Zevon – vocals, guitar, piano, keyboards, percussion
- Peter Asher – additional vocals on "The Indifference of Heaven"
- Rosemary Butler – additional vocals on "Jesus Was a Cross Maker" and "Mutineer"
- Jorge Calderón – bass guitar on "Seminole Bingo", additional vocals on "Poisonous Lookalike"
- Bruce Hornsby – accordion on "Piano Fighter" and "Monkey Wash Donkey Rinse"
- Larry Klein – bass on "Rottweiler Blues" and "Mutineer"
- David Lindley – fiddle and cittern on "Poisonous Lookalike"; fiddle on "Monkey Wash Donkey Rinse"
- Michael Wolff – keyboards on "Similar to Rain"

=== Production ===
- Producer: Warren Zevon
- Engineer: Duncan Aldrich

== Charts ==
Weekly chart performance for Mutineer
Chart (2025)	Peak position
Hungarian Physical Albums (MAHASZ)	40
