= Poor Poor Pitiful Me =

1976 song by Warren Zevon

Song by Warren Zevon

from the album Warren Zevon
- Released: 1976
- Genre: Country rock
- Length: 3:04
- Label: Asylum
- Songwriter: Warren Zevon
- Producer: Jackson Browne

Audio
- "Poor Poor Pitiful Me" by Warren Zevon on YouTube

"Poor Poor Pitiful Me" is a rock song written and first recorded by American musician Warren Zevon in 1976.

With change in the lyrics from male to female perspective, it was made a hit twice after Zevon’s recording: first as a top-40 hit for Linda Ronstadt in 1976, then two decades later by Terri Clark, whose version topped the Canadian country charts and reached the country top five in the U.S.

== Warren Zevon version ==
=== Background ===
In keeping with Warren Zevon's sardonic lyrical style, the song's verses deal with the narrator's suicide attempt, domestic abuse, and a brush with sadomasochism. In the chorus, the narrator laments the problems he has created for himself with the refrain "Poor poor pitiful me." Zevon said the lyrics were semi-autobiographical but highly exaggerated, and intended as self-parody. It has also been reported "Poor Poor Pitiful Me" was an affectionate spoof of introspective songs written by Zevon's friend Jackson Browne.

The song "Poor Poor Pitiful Me" was produced by Browne and was featured on Zevon's eponymous 1976 album Warren Zevon with backing vocals by Lindsey Buckingham. Zevon wrote the music on violin, rather than his usual piano or guitar.

The track was later included on his greatest hits compilations A Quiet Normal Life (1986), I’ll Sleep When I’m Dead (1996), and Genius: The Best of Warren Zevon (2002). Live versions appeared on 1980s Stand in the Fire and 1993's Learning to Flinch. Alternate studio versions were included in the 2008 reissue of Warren Zevon, as well as the posthumous 2007 compilation Preludes: Rare and Unreleased Recordings.

=== Personnel ===
- Warren Zevon – rhythm guitar, vocals
- Lindsey Buckingham – harmony vocals
- Bob Glaub – bass guitar
- Bobby Keys – saxophone
- David Lindley – fiddle
- Waddy Wachtel – guitar, vocals
- Carl Wilson – vocal arrangements
- Jai Winding – piano
- Larry Zack – drums

=== Reception ===
The Atlantic said, "Warren Zevon's song is a hedonist's lament, the croak of a raddled old lotus-eater. His voice is clenched and ironic. Burned-out endorphins are grating at the back of his brain."

== Linda Ronstadt version ==
"Poor Poor Pitiful Me"
- One of side-A labels of the US single

Single by Linda Ronstadt

from the album Simple Dreams
- B-side: "Simple Man Simple Dream" (or "Blue Bayou")
- Released: January 10, 1978
- Genre: Country rock
- Length: 3:42
- Label: Asylum 45462
- Songwriter: Warren Zevon
- Producer: Peter Asher

Linda Ronstadt singles chronology
"It's So Easy" (1977)	"Poor Poor Pitiful Me" (1978)	"Tumbling Dice" (1978)

Audio
- "Poor Poor Pitiful Me" by Linda Ronstadt on YouTube

=== Background ===
Linda Ronstadt recorded a version of the song in 1977 with a change in perspective from the male narrator of the original song to a woman’s view. Ronstadt would recall Jackson Browne had pitched "Poor Poor Pitiful Me" to her, teaching it to her in the living room of her Malibu home. "The verse in “Poor Pitiful Me” was “I met a girl on the Sunset Strip,” I think, “She asked me if I’d beat her / She took me up to her hotel room / And wrecked my mojo heater.” It was really funny, and I'm saying to Jackson, “I can’t sing those words, man! That’s not who I am. . . . I have to leave that part out.”

With Zevon's blessing, Ronstadt replaced the verse with “Well I met a boy in the Vieux Carré / Down in Yokohama / He picked me up and he threw me down / Saying 'Please don't hurt me Mama!'.” This verse was also used in Clark's version of the song. Earlier demo tapes later released on Preludes: Rare and Unreleased Recordings show at one point Zevon had intended to use the Vieux Carré verse as the song's opening verse, before scrapping it, then later blessing its use as the song's final verse on Ronstadt's arrangement (an arrangement Zevon would often imitate in live shows such as the version recorded on Stand in the Fire).

Ronstadt's interpretation was produced by Peter Asher for her multi-platinum album Simple Dreams. Ronstadt's live version appeared on the soundtrack album to the 1978 movie FM, while the studio version was included on her platinum-plus album Greatest Hits, Volume 2.

=== Reception ===
Released as a single on the Asylum label at the beginning of 1978, Ronstadt's version was the week's highest debut on the Billboard Hot 100 chart the week of January 28, 1978. It reached number 26 on the Cash Box Top 100 and number 31 in Billboard.

=== Chart performance ===
Chart (1978)	Peak position
Canadian RPM Adult Contemporary Tracks	9
Canadian RPM Country Tracks	36
Canadian RPM Top Singles	31
US Hot Country Songs (Billboard)	46
U.S. Billboard Easy Listening	27
US Billboard Hot 100	31
U.S. Cash Box Top 100	26

== Terri Clark version ==
"Poor Poor Pitiful Me"

Single by Terri Clark

from the album Just the Same
- B-side: "Something You Should've Said"
- Released: September 23, 1996
- Genre: Country
- Length: 3:10
- Label: Mercury
- Songwriter: Warren Zevon
- Producers: Keith Stegall; Chris Waters; Terri Clark

Terri Clark singles chronology
"Suddenly Single" (1996)	"Poor Poor Pitiful Me" (1996)	"Emotional Girl" (1997)

Music video
- "Poor Poor Pitiful Me" on YouTube

=== Background ===
Another hit cover version of the song was recorded by Canadian country singer Terri Clark. It was released in September 1996 as the lead single from her second album, 1996's Just the Same. Clark told Billboard magazine that she heard Linda Ronstadt's version of the song in a local gymnasium while she was exercising. She said "and I thought, what a cool song. What a great country record that could make. I started doing it live, and it worked."

=== Reception ===
"Poor Poor Pitiful Me" debuted at number 47 on the U.S. Billboard Hot Country Singles & Tracks for the week of October 12, 1996. Clark's version was a number one hit on the Canadian RPM country charts, and a number five hit on the country charts in the U.S.

Zevon would express approval of Clark's cover, including in what became his last public performance at the Edmonton Folk Music Festival in 2002 where he ended his performance of "Poor Poor Pitiful Me" by exclaiming "Thank you Terri Clark!"

=== Music video ===
The music video was directed by Deaton Flanigen and premiered in late 1996. It comprises black-and-white tour footage interspersed with Clark being approached by a series of men while her car is being fixed at a full service gas station. Eventually, she realizes the man fixing her car is the one for her. She starts to drive off, before calling him over to get in. The two drive off together, leaving the other two co-workers at the shop surprised.

=== Chart performance ===
Chart (1996)	Peak position
Canada Country Singles (RPM)	1
US Bubbling Under Hot 100 (Billboard)	109
US Hot Country Songs (Billboard)	5

=== Year-end charts ===
Chart (1996)	Position
Canada Country Tracks (RPM)	43

== Other versions ==
- In 1986, SNFU did a hardcore punk cover of the song on the compilation It Came from the Pit. Lead singer Mr. Chi Pig sang the Linda Ronstadt lyrics with a few changes, but kept it as being about men he had encountered.
- Vitamin String Quartet recorded an instrumental version of the song on Dad Get Me Out of This: The String Quartet Tribute to Warren Zevon in 2003.
- In 2004 Jackson Browne and Bonnie Raitt covered it on Enjoy Every Sandwich: The Songs of Warren Zevon.
