= My Ride's Here =

Studio album by Warren Zevon
- Released: May 7, 2002
- Recorded: 2001
- Studios: Anatomy of a Headache, Los Angeles; The Ed Sullivan Theater, New York; Pilot Studios, New York; Private Island Studios, Los Angeles; Spike Recording, New York
- Genre: Rock
- Length: 41:10
- Label: Artemis
- Producer: Warren Zevon

Warren Zevon chronology
Life'll Kill Ya (2000)	My Ride's Here (2002)	Genius: The Best of Warren Zevon (2002)

Singles from My Ride's Here
- 1. "Basket Case" Released: 2002; 2. "Hit Somebody! (The Hockey Song)" Released: 2002; 3. "Genius" Released: 2002

My Ride's Here is the eleventh studio album by American singer-songwriter Warren Zevon. The album was released on May 7, 2002, by Artemis Records. Zevon described it as "a meditation on death"; it was released several months before Zevon was diagnosed with terminal mesothelioma.

On My Ride's Here, Zevon collaborated with a number of writers from outside the world of music. The song "Basket Case" features in Carl Hiaasen's novel of the same name where it was performed by a fictional rock band. Zevon also covers Serge Gainsbourg's "Laissez-Moi Tranquille" which roughly translates as "leave me alone". Gainsbourg first recorded it in 1960 on the Romantique 60 EP. "I Have to Leave" was a song written by Zevon's high school friend, Dan McFarland. Zevon had told sports writer and Rock Bottom Remainders member Mitch Albom about his desire to write a hockey song (telling Albom "nobody sings about hockey") and the two would collaborate to write "Hit Somebody!" which would feature performances from Late Show cast members David Letterman and Paul Schaffer. "You're a Whole Different Person When You're Scared" was cowritten with Hunter S. Thompson, and a phrase from the song would share the title for Thompson's 2003 book Kingdom of Fear.

The title track of the album was cowritten by Zevon and Paul Muldoon. Muldoon had studied Zevon's catalog prior to cowriting the song, with a character named Jim alluding to "Werewolves of London" and the opening verse at a hotel mirroring the opening setting of "Desperados Under the Eaves." Romantic poets, Percy Bysshe Shelley, John Keats and Lord Byron; are referenced during the song, with Byron also featuring in the track "Lord Byron's Luggage" the only song on the album attributed to Zevon writing solo. "My Ride's Here" would be covered by Bruce Springsteen to open a concert at the SkyDome Toronto in 2003 shortly after Zevon's passing, and the live recording would be featured on Enjoy Every Sandwich: The Songs of Warren Zevon.

== Reception ==
Professional ratings
Review scores
Source	Rating
AllMusic	2/5 stars
Robert Christgau	A−
Encyclopedia of Popular Music	3/5 stars
Rolling Stone	3.5/5 stars
The New Rolling Stone Album Guide (2004)	3.5/5 stars
Uncut	8/10

Mark Deming of AllMusic rated My Ride's Here two out of five stars. He stated that "the jokes tend to be a bit obvious", and that "the more introspective moments don't connect the way one might hope". However, he said that some of the tracks "are strong enough to remind listeners of just how talented Zevon still is". He concluded by saying that the album "is a misfire from an artist capable of much better work." Robert Christgau rated the album an A−, stating that Zevon was "at his best in the fictional-mythic mode that prevails". In a twenty year retrospective review Joey Arnone of Under the Radar would praise the album as "one of Zevon's key releases" and ranked it higher than the contemporary Zevon albums The Wind and Life'll Kill Ya.

== Track listing ==
No.	Title	Writer(s)	Length
1.	"Sacrificial Lambs"	Larry Klein, Warren Zevon	3:55
2.	"Basket Case"	Carl Hiaasen, Zevon	3:37
3.	"Lord Byron's Luggage"	Zevon	4:35
4.	"Macgillycuddy's Reeks"	Paul Muldoon, Zevon	3:04
5.	"You're a Whole Different Person When You're Scared"	Hunter S. Thompson, Zevon	5:14
6.	"Hit Somebody! (The Hockey Song)"	Mitch Albom, Zevon	5:26
7.	"Genius"	Larry Klein, Zevon	5:01
8.	"Laissez-moi tranquille"	Serge Gainsbourg	3:32
9.	"I Have to Leave"	Dan McFarland	3:05
10.	"My Ride's Here"	Paul Muldoon, Zevon	3:41

== Personnel ==
- Warren Zevon – guitar, keyboards, vocals
- Charlie Bisharat – violin on "Genius"
- Larry Corbett – cello on "Genius"
- Joel Derouin – violin on "Genius"
- Anton Fig – drums
- Sheldon Gomberg – bass guitar
- David Letterman – background vocals on "Hit Somebody! (The Hockey Song)"
- Tony Levin – bass guitar on "Hit Somebody! (The Hockey Song)"
- Sid McGinnis – guitar on "Hit Somebody! (The Hockey Song)"
- Katy Salvidge – fiddle, tin whistle
- Paul Shaffer – organ on "Hit Somebody! (The Hockey Song)"
- Evan Wilson – viola on "Genius"
- Michael Wolff – organ on "You're a Whole Different Person When You're Scared"
- Jordan Zevon, Ariel Zevon, David Letterman – additional vocals

Production

- Warren Zevon – producer, mixing, arranger
- Michael Delugg – engineer
- Harvey Goldberg – engineer
- Klint Macro – engineer
- Will Schillinger – engineer
- Noah Scot Snyder – engineer, mixing
- Stephen Marcussen – mastering
- Michael Krumper – A&R
- Henry Diltz – photography

== Charts ==
Album

Year	Chart	Position
2002	Top Independent Albums	22
