= The Wind (Warren Zevon album) =

Studio album by Warren Zevon
- Released: August 26, 2003
- Recorded: September 16 – December 20, 2002 and early 2003
- Studios: Various, including Billy Bob Thornton's Snakepit home studio
- Genre: Folk rock
- Length: 45:08
- Language: English
- Label: Artemis
- Producers: Jorge Calderón, Noah Scot Snyder, Warren Zevon

Warren Zevon chronology
The First Sessions (2003)	The Wind (2003)	Reconsider Me: The Love Songs (2006)

Singles from The Wind
- 1. "Disorder in the House" Released: 2003; 2. "Knockin' on Heaven's Door" Released: 2003

Professional ratings
Review scores
Source	Rating
AllMusic	4/5 stars
MSN Music (Consumer Guide)	A−
Encyclopedia of Popular Music	4/5 stars
Rolling Stone	4/5 stars
Uncut	8/10

The Wind is the twelfth and final studio album by American singer-songwriter Warren Zevon. The album was released on August 26, 2003, by Artemis Records. Zevon began recording the album shortly after he was diagnosed with inoperable pleural mesothelioma (a cancer of the lining of the lung), and it was released just two weeks before his death on September 7, 2003. The album was awarded the Grammy Award for Best Contemporary Folk Album, and "Disorder in the House", performed by Zevon with Bruce Springsteen, won the Grammy for Best Rock Vocal Performance (Group or Duo). Songs from the album were nominated for an additional three Grammys.

== Recording and release ==
Following My Ride's Here Zevon had begun working on new music, writing "Dirty Life and Times" and "She's Too Good for Me" prior to his cancer diagnosis, and having begun to incorporate "Dirty Life and Times" into his live set. Around the time he would perform what would become his final live show at the Edmonton Folk Music Festival on August 9, 2002. Zevon was found sick and short of breath by his tour managers and encouraged to see a doctor. Zevon was diagnosed with cancer on the 28th of that month.

Upon learning of his cancer diagnosis, Zevon became determined to record a final studio album. For this, Zevon entrusted his long time friend Jorge Calderón to help produce and write the album with him, and ensure it would be seen to completion. Zevon's record label gave him a large budget to record, and he got assistance from high-profile friends such as Bruce Springsteen, Don Henley, Emmylou Harris, Tom Petty, Jackson Browne, and Billy Bob Thornton. Zevon was also joined by his son Jordan Zevon as a backing vocalist on the album. Zevon was inspired to include a Bob Dylan cover after Dylan performed several of his songs in concert in 2002.

Calderón often struggled with Zevon during the recording process, as his terminal diagnosis had caused Zevon to relapse into alcoholism and suffer regular bouts of depression, causing him to sometimes disappear for several days at a time. In a conversation with his friend Mitch Albom shortly after his diagnosis, Zevon would sum up his struggles with his mortality by asking Albom, “So . . . am I supposed to die with my boots on?” Zevon would express guilt over his relapse into drinking, including in conversations with his ex-wife Crystal who reminded Zevon of his family's support as he was working on the album and confronting his mortality. Zevon would take a break from working on the album to travel to New York City to Studio 50 where he would film a final appearance on The Late Show with David Letterman, which aired at the end of October. A film crew from VH1 would produce a documentary on the album, which aired posthumously as (Inside) Out - Warren Zevon: Keep Me In Your Heart.

Calderón viewed the album's creation as giving Zevon a purpose to live for and encouraged Zevon to continue working on the album, while Zevon would also note his desire to complete the album and live long enough to see his grandchildren born (along with living to see the release of Die Another Day). Lyrics often took inspiration from frequent conversations and phone calls between the two. For example, Zevon once described in a phone call to Calderón his prescription pills leaving him feeling "as numb as a statue" which led to a song of the same title. The "davenport of despair" mentioned in "Disorder in the House" was a reference to the couch in Zevon's home that Calderón and Zevon had nicknamed "the couch of pain" and the "divan of despair" while first working on lyrics for Mr. Bad Example and subsequent albums on the couch prior to The Wind. Other lyrics in the song referenced the recent war on terror.

As Zevon's cancer worsened during the production of the album, Calderón frequently pushed for Zevon to record "Keep Me in Your Heart," a song which Zevon had begun writing shortly after his diagnosis. Following the birth of his twin grandsons, Zevon would be joined by his daughter Ariel and Calderón, who would prop him up on his couch to record the finished "Keep Me in Your Heart" as the final track of the album on April 12, 2003.

== Critical reception ==
The record was regarded by Robert Christgau as "one of those nearness-of-death albums", along with Mississippi John Hurt's Last Sessions (1972), Neil Young's Prairie Wind (2005), and Johnny Cash's American VI: Ain't No Grave (2010).

== Track listing ==
All tracks written by Jorge Calderón and Warren Zevon, except where indicated.

No.	Title	Writer(s)	Length
1.	"Dirty Life and Times"	Zevon	3:15
2.	"Disorder in the House"		4:36
3.	"Knockin' on Heaven's Door"	Bob Dylan	4:05
4.	"Numb as a Statue"		4:08
5.	"She's Too Good for Me"	Zevon	3:12
6.	"Prison Grove"		4:51
7.	"El amor de mi vida"		3:34
8.	"The Rest of the Night"		4:41
9.	"Please Stay"	Zevon	3:34
10.	"Rub Me Raw"		5:44
11.	"Keep Me in Your Heart"		3:28

== Personnel ==
Adapted credits from the liner notes of The Wind.

"Dirty Life and Times"

- Warren Zevon – vocals and acoustic guitar
- Ry Cooder – guitar
- Jorge Calderón – bass guitar
- Don Henley – drums
- Billy Bob Thornton – backing vocals
- Dwight Yoakam – backing vocals

"Disorder in the House"

- Warren Zevon – vocals
- Jorge Calderón – bass guitar, acoustic guitar and percussion
- Jim Keltner – drums
- Bruce Springsteen – electric guitar and backing vocals

"Knockin' on Heaven's Door"

- Warren Zevon – vocals
- Jorge Calderón – backing vocals, bass
- Brad Davis – electric guitar and backing vocals
- Steve Gorman – drums
- Randy Mitchell – slide guitar and backing vocals
- Tommy Shaw – 12-string acoustic guitar and backing vocals
- Billy Bob Thornton – backing vocals
- John Waite – backing vocals

"Numb as a Statue"

- Warren Zevon – vocals and piano
- Jorge Calderón – bass guitar, maracas and backing vocals
- Jim Keltner – drums
- David Lindley – lap steel guitar

"She's Too Good for Me"

- Warren Zevon – vocals and acoustic guitar
- Jorge Calderon – bass guitar
- Luis Conte – drums and percussion
- Don Henley – backing vocals
- Timothy B. Schmit – backing vocals

"Prison Grove"

- Warren Zevon – vocals
- Ry Cooder – slide guitar
- David Lindley – electric saz and backing vocals
- Jorge Calderon – electric guitar and backing vocals
- Reggie Hamilton – upright bass
- Jim Keltner – drums
- Jordan Zevon – backing vocals
- Bruce Springsteen – backing vocals
- Jackson Browne – backing vocals
- Billy Bob Thornton – backing vocals
- T Bone Burnett – backing vocals

"El Amor de Mi Vida"

- Warren Zevon – vocals
- Jorge Calderón – Spanish-language vocals
- Luis Conte – bongos
- Reggie Hamilton – upright bass
- Jim Keltner – drums
- James Raymond – piano

"The Rest of the Night"

- Warren Zevon – vocals and electric guitar
- Mike Campbell – electric guitar
- Jorge Calderón – bass guitar and electric guitar
- Luis Conte – drums and percussion
- Tom Petty – backing vocals

"Please Stay"

- Warren Zevon – vocals and keyboard
- Gil Bernal – saxophone
- Jorge Calderón – bass guitar
- Luis Conte – drums and percussion
- Emmylou Harris – backing vocals

"Rub Me Raw"

- Warren Zevon – vocals
- Jorge Calderón – electric guitar and bass guitar
- Jim Keltner – drums
- Joe Walsh – slide guitar

"Keep Me in Your Heart"

- Warren Zevon – vocals
- Jorge Calderón – acoustic guitar, bass guitar and tres
- Jim Keltner – drums

Technical personnel

- Bridgette Barr – executive Record producer
- Hugh Brown – art direction
- Jorge Calderón – production
- Steve Churchyard – engineering
- Greg Hayes – engineering
- Stephen Marcussen – mastering
- James Mitchell – engineering
- Matthew Rolston – cover photo
- Noah Scot Snyder – engineering, mixing, production
- Joe West – engineering
- Jordan Zevon – executive production
- Warren Zevon – production

== Chart performance ==
Year	Chart	Position
2003	US Top Internet Albums	12
2003	US Billboard 200	12
2003	US Top Independent Albums	1

== Awards ==
Grammy Awards

Year	Winner	Category
2004	"Disorder in the House"	Best Rock Vocal Performance – Duo or Group
2004	The Wind	Best Contemporary Folk Album

Grammy Award Nominations

Year	Nominee	Category
2004	"Keep Me in Your Heart"	Song of the Year
2004	"Keep Me in Your Heart"	Best Pop Vocal Performance – Male
2004	"Disorder in the House"	Best Rock Song

== Legacy ==
"Keep Me in Your Heart" has been frequently covered by various artists since Zevon's death, with Jorge Calderón providing his own rendition on Enjoy Every Sandwich: The Songs of Warren Zevon in 2004. Eddie Vedder performed the song for David Letterman's award ceremony in 2017 for the Mark Twain Prize for American Humor, with Vedder noting Letterman's role in introducing him to Zevon's music. Further covers of the song have included Christine Albert's 2014 album Everything’s Beautiful Now, Wesley Schultz on his 2018 album Vignettes, a 2023 single release by Fantastic Cat, and separate 2024 releases by both Widespread Panic and by Willie Nelson for his album Last Leaf on the Tree. Nelson's cover was noted by American Songwriter for capturing a similar view on mortality as Zevon's original performance, with Nelson's guitarwork with Trigger sounding similarly aged and "beat up." On a 2025 list, Rolling Stone placed "Keep Me in Your Heart" as the 244th best song of the 21st century.
