= Learning to Flinch =

Live album by Warren Zevon
- Released: April 13, 1993
- Recorded: June 24, 1992 – October 13, 1992
- Genre: Rock
- Length: 75:40
- Label: Giant Records
- Producers: Warren Zevon, Duncan Aldrich

Warren Zevon chronology
Mr. Bad Example (1991)	Learning to Flinch (1993)	Mutineer (1995)

Professional ratings
Review scores
Source	Rating
Allmusic	link
Robert Christgau	(dud)
Encyclopedia of Popular Music	4/5 stars
Rolling Stone	link

Learning to Flinch is a live solo acoustic album by American singer-songwriter Warren Zevon, recorded at various venues in the United States, Europe, New Zealand, and Australia and released in early 1993.

Zevon's second live album, it featured three new songs ("Worrier King," "Piano Fighter" and "The Indifference of Heaven"). The album received its first vinyl pressing in 2025 for Record Store Day as part of the Warren Zevon Piano Fighter: Giant Years with a wide release as a standalone album for Rhino's "Rocktober" later that same year.

== Track listing ==
All tracks composed by Warren Zevon, except where indicated.

Side one

1. "Splendid Isolation" – 4:20 – Bogarts, Cincinnati
2. "Lawyers, Guns and Money" – 3:22 – Paradise, Boston
3. "Mr. Bad Example" (Jorge Calderón, Zevon) – 3:08 – The Loft, Berlin
4. "Excitable Boy" (LeRoy Marinell, Zevon) – 2:41 – Tipitina's, New Orleans
5. "Hasten Down the Wind" – 3:41 – The Town Hall, New York
6. "The French Inhaler" – 4:22 – Town & Country, London
7. "Worrier King" – 4:05 – Gluepot, Auckland
8. "Roland Chorale" (David Lindell, Zevon) – 1:30 – Gluepot, Auckland
9. "Roland the Headless Thompson Gunner" (Lindell, Zevon) – 11:18 – Sentrum, Oslo

Side two

1. "Searching for a Heart" – 3:05 – Burswood Casino, Perth
2. "Boom Boom Mancini" – 3:18 – The Flood Zone, Richmond
3. "Jungle Work" (Calderón, Zevon) – 4:53 – St. Mary's Leagues Club, St. Mary's
4. "Piano Fighter" – 4:08 – The Cambridge Hotel, Newcastle
5. "Werewolves of London" (Marinell, Waddy Wachtel, Zevon) – 4:10 – Town & Country, London
6. "The Indifference of Heaven" – 4:12 – Biskuithalle, Bonn
7. "Poor, Poor Pitiful Me" – 9:38 – Big Ticket, Adelaide
8. "Play It All Night Long" – 3:49 – Park West, Chicago

== Personnel ==
- Warren Zevon – guitar, keyboards, vocals, harmonica

=== Production ===
Producers: Warren Zevon, Duncan Aldrich

== Charts ==
Chart (1993)	Peak position
US Billboard 200	198
