= Transverse City =

Studio album by Warren Zevon
- Released: October 12, 1989
- Recorded: 1989
- Studios: Mad Hatter, Los Angeles; A&M, Hollywood; Red Zone, Burbank, California; Broken Arrow Ranch, California; Abbey Road, London; Paisley Park, Chanhassen, Minnesota
- Genre: Rock
- Length: 41:40
- Label: Virgin
- Producers: Warren Zevon; Duncan Aldrich; Andrew Slater

Warren Zevon chronology
Sentimental Hygiene (1987)	Transverse City (1989)	Mr. Bad Example (1991)

Singles from Transverse City
- 1. "Run Straight Down" Released: 1989; 2. "Splendid Isolation" Released: 1989

Professional ratings
Review scores
Source	Rating
AllMusic	4/5 stars
Robert Christgau	B+
The Encyclopedia of Popular Music	3/5 stars

Transverse City is the seventh studio album by American recording artist Warren Zevon, released in October 1989 by Virgin Records. It features appearances from guitarists Neil Young, David Gilmour (of Pink Floyd), Jerry Garcia (of Grateful Dead) and Mike Campbell (of Tom Petty and the Heartbreakers), as well as jazz pianist Chick Corea. Michael Ironside provides narration on the track "Run Straight Down".

== Track listing ==
All tracks composed by Warren Zevon, except where indicated.

Side one
No.	Title	Writer(s)	Length
1.	"Transverse City"	Stefan Arngrim, Zevon	4:19
2.	"Run Straight Down"		4:05
3.	"The Long Arm of the Law"		3:47
4.	"Turbulence"		4:08
5.	"They Moved the Moon"		4:31

Side two
No.	Title	Writer(s)	Length
6.	"Splendid Isolation"		4:35
7.	"Networking"	Arngrim, Zevon	3:02
8.	"Gridlock"		4:34
9.	"Down in the Mall"		4:28
10.	"Nobody's in Love This Year"		4:17

== Personnel ==
- Warren Zevon – vocals, guitar, harmonica, piano, keyboards, harmony
- Jorge Calderón – bass and harmony on "Networking"; harmony on "Gridlock"
- Mike Campbell – guitar on "Splendid Isolation"; guitar and mandolin on "Nobody's in Love This Year"
- Jack Casady – bass on "They Moved the Moon" and "Gridlock"
- Chick Corea – piano on "The Long Arm of the Law"
- Howie Epstein – banjo, mandolin on "Networking"; bass on "Down in the Mall"
- Jerry Garcia – guitar on "Transverse City" and "They Moved the Moon"
- David Gilmour – guitar on "Run Straight Down"
- Bob Glaub – bass
- Richie Hayward – drums
- Mark Isham – flugelhorn on "Nobody's in Love This Year"
- Rob Jaczko – miscellaneous percussion
- Jorma Kaukonen – acoustic guitar and harmony on "Gridlock"
- David Lindley – saz, steel guitar, oud, harmony vocals, lap steel guitar on "Down in the Mall"
- John Patitucci – bass on "Transverse City"
- JD Souther – harmony vocals on "Run Straight Down", "Turbulence" and "Nobody's in Love This Year"
- Benmont Tench – organ on "Networking"
- Waddy Wachtel – acoustic guitar on "Run Straight Down", "Networking" and "Nobody's in Love This Year"
- Neil Young – lead guitar on "Gridlock", harmony vocals on "Splendid Isolation"
- Jordan Zevon – harmony vocals on "The Long Arm of the Law"

=== Production ===
- Producers: Warren Zevon, Duncan Aldrich, Andrew Slater
- Engineers: Duncan Aldrich, John Cutler, Andrew Jackson, Andy Jackson, Rob Jaczko, Tim Mulligan
- Assistant engineers: Heidi Hanschu, Robert Reed, Ira Rubnitz
- Mixing: Rob Jaczko
- Design: Jimmy Wachtel
- Art direction: Jimmy Wachtel
- Photography: Jonathan Exley, Nels Israelson, Jimmy Wachtel

== Charts ==
Singles

Year	Single	Chart	Position
1989	"Run Straight Down"	Mainstream Rock Tracks	30
