= Wanted Dead or Alive (Warren Zevon album) =

Studio album by Zevon
- Released: April 1970
- Studio: Wally Heider's Studio III, San Francisco, California
- Genre: Rock, psychedelic rock, blues
- Length: 30:58
- Label: Liberty
- Producer: Warren Zevon

Warren Zevon chronology
Wanted Dead or Alive (1970)	Warren Zevon (1976)

Professional ratings
Review scores
Source	Rating
AllMusic	3/5 stars
The Encyclopedia of Popular Music	2/5 stars

Wanted Dead or Alive is the debut studio album by singer-songwriter Warren Zevon. The album released by Liberty Records in 1970 under the moniker "Zevon".

== Production ==
Kim Fowley began the project as producer, but left after disagreements with Zevon and did not take credit for production duties. Fowley later remembered:

[Warren] wanted to play all the instruments himself. He wouldn't listen to anybody. I wasn't trying to produce him because you really couldn't produce Warren, at least not in those days, but I was trying to help him make a record that might sell more than ten copies, all purchased by his friends. But, he didn't listen to anyone about anything, and one day I just walked in thinking I'd had enough.

Zevon chalked up his disagreement with Fowley to a "sudden attack of taste".

== Reception ==
"Wanted Dead or Alive" was a commercial and critical failure. The album was released "to the sound of one hand clapping", as Zevon later remarked. Sales were poor, and critics ignored the album. Jackson Browne later commented, "I don't remember thinking [the album] was as good as he really was." Attempts to record a follow-up album, called Leaf in the Wind, were abandoned, and Zevon found work as band leader and musical coordinator for The Everly Brothers. His next album, the critically acclaimed classic Warren Zevon, was not released until 1976. Once Zevon reached stardom, Wanted Dead or Alive ended up as an all-but-forgotten relic of his early career.

== Re-release ==
Wanted Dead or Alive was initially released on CD by One Way Records in 1996. Following the announcement that Zevon had terminal lung cancer, Capitol Records put out a remastered version of the album in early 2003, which was initially intended to have the entirety of Leaf in the Wind, but those plans were scrapped at the last minute for unknown reasons.

== Legacy ==
The track "She Quit Me" was featured in the 1969 film Midnight Cowboy (performed by Lesley Miller) as "He Quit Me". "Tule's Blues" was written about Zevon's lover, Marilyn "Tule" Livingston, mother of his son Jordan. It was covered in 1972 as a single by the group Sugarblu on Warner Bros. Records.

== Track listing ==
All tracks composed and arranged by Warren Zevon; except where indicated

Side one
No.	Title	Writer(s)	Length
1.	"Wanted Dead or Alive"	Kim Fowley, Martin Cerf	2:36
2.	"Hitch Hikin' Woman"		2:16
3.	"She Quit Me"		4:48
4.	"Calcutta"		2:19
5.	"Iko-Iko"	Marilyn Jones, Sharon Jones, Joe Jones, M. Thomas	1:54

Side two
No.	Title	Writer(s)	Length
6.	"Traveling in the Lightning"		3:05
7.	"Tule's Blues"		3:32
8.	"A Bullet for Ramona"	music: Warren Zevon; lyrics: Paul Evans	3:50
9.	"Gorilla"		3:23
10.	"Fiery Emblems" (instrumental)		3:15

== Personnel ==
- Warren Zevon – bass guitar, guitar, piano, percussion, harmonica, vocals
- Skip Battin – bass guitar
- Drachen Theaker – drums
- Jon Corneal – drums on "Hitchhikin' Woman" and "Tule's Blues"; percussion on "Fiery Emblems"
- Toxey French – drums on "A Bullet for Ramona"
- Brent Seawell – bass on "A Bullet for Ramona"
- Sweet Trifles – background vocals on "Iko-Iko"
- Shutter Ed Caraeff – maracas on "Hitch Hikin' Woman"

Technical

- Johnny Golden – engineer
- Richard Edlund – photography, artwork
