= Bad Luck Streak in Dancing School =

Studio album by Warren Zevon
- Released: February 15, 1980
- Recorded: 1979
- Studios: The Sound Factory, Hollywood, California
- Genre: Rock
- Length: 35:31
- Label: Elektra
- Producers: Greg Ladanyi, Warren Zevon

Warren Zevon chronology
Excitable Boy (1978)	Bad Luck Streak in Dancing School (1980)	Stand in the Fire (1980)

Singles from Bad Luck Streak in Dancing School
- 1. "A Certain Girl" Released: 1980; 2. "Jeannie Needs a Shooter" Released: 1980; 3. "Gorilla, You're a Desperado" Released: 1980

Bad Luck Streak in Dancing School is the fourth studio album by American singer-songwriter Warren Zevon. The album was released on February 15, 1980, by Elektra Records. Three singles were released from the album, one of which charted: a cover of 1960s R&B song "A Certain Girl" reached No. 57 on the Billboard Hot 100 and was Zevon's second and final hit on that chart.

The album was dedicated to Ken Millar (1915–1983), popularly known as mystery writer Ross Macdonald, who had assisted Zevon in successfully completing a substance abuse addiction treatment program.

== Critical reception ==
Professional ratings
Review scores
Source	Rating
AllMusic	4.5/5 stars
Robert Christgau	B−
The Encyclopedia of Popular Music	3/5 stars
Record Mirror	4.5/5 stars
Rolling Stone	(positive)
Uncut	8/10

In an essay on the album, journalist James Campion would note Zevon's desire to escape from traditional rock arrangements and embrace his classical music training; comparing Zevon's string arrangements in the album to an unpublished symphony Zevon would work on throughout his life. Campion also noted the unusual instrumentation in the album achieved by Zevon firing a .44 Magnum (the same pistol that had been featured in the centerfold art of Excitable Boy) into a barrel of sand inside the recording studio to achieve the short rapid percussion noises at the start of the album's title track. The album title was derived from both Zevon's practice of ballet to keep in shape and a quip Zevon made about "bad luck streak in dancing school" after falling off stage in Chicago during a 1978 show.

Record World said of the single "Gorilla, You're a Desperado" that "Zevon paints a picturesque fantasy of LA upper middle class absurdity." "Play It All Night Long" has been covered by alternative country band Drive-By Truckers who released the track in 2009's The Fine Print: A Collection of Oddities and Rarities, including elements of Zevon's "Ain't That Pretty At All" along with modified lyrics referencing Zevon's death due to cancer in 2003.

"Jeannie Needs A Shooter" would draw attention for being developed based on the title of a then unreleased demo track from Bruce Springsteen's Born to Run sessions, with Zevon once describing the track by stating "there may be a whole other version of a song recorded with good musicians, and then I toss it out because I hear a whole other song with the same title.” In 2020 Springsteen released his finished track "Janey Needs A Shooter" on his album Letter to You drawing comparisons between Springsteen's and Zevon's differing songs.

== Track listing ==
All songs written by Warren Zevon, unless otherwise indicated.

Side one
No.	Title	Writer(s)	Length
1.	"Bad Luck Streak in Dancing School"		3:00
2.	"A Certain Girl"	Naomi Neville	3:08
3.	"Jungle Work"	Jorge Calderón, Zevon	3:58
4.	"Empty-Handed Heart"		3:16
5.	"Interlude No. 1"		0:26
6.	"Play It All Night Long"		2:53

Side two
No.	Title	Writer(s)	Length
7.	"Jeannie Needs a Shooter"	Bruce Springsteen, Zevon	3:55
8.	"Interlude No. 2"		1:08
9.	"Bill Lee"		1:37
10.	"Gorilla, You're a Desperado"		2:47
11.	"Bed of Coals"	T Bone Burnett, Zevon	5:04
12.	"Wild Age"		4:19

== Personnel ==
- Warren Zevon – organ, synthesizer, bass guitar, guitar, harmonica, piano, keyboards, vocals, string arrangements, .44 magnum pistol
- Jorge Calderón – guitar on "A Certain Girl"; backing vocals on "Jungle Work"
- David Lindley – lap steel on "Bad Luck Streak in Dancing School" and "Play It All Night Long"; guitar on "Wild Age"
- Leland Sklar – bass guitar
- Rick Marotta – percussion, drums, vocals, bells, Syndrums

Additional personnel

- The Sid Sharp Strings – strings
- Jackson Browne – guitar and slide guitar on "Gorilla, You're a Desperado"; backing vocals on "A Certain Girl", "Play It All Night Long" and "Gorilla, You're a Desperado"
- Don Felder – guitar on "A Certain Girl"
- Glenn Frey – harmony vocals on "Bill Lee" and "Wild Age"
- Don Henley – harmony vocals on "Wild Age" and "Gorilla, You're a Desperado"
- Ben Keith – pedal steel guitar on "Bed of Coals"
- Linda Ronstadt – descant on "Empty-Handed Heart"; backing vocals on "Bed of Coals"
- JD Souther – backing vocals on "Gorilla, You're a Desperado" and "Bed of Coals"
- Waddy Wachtel – lead guitar on "A Certain Girl"; guitar on "Empty-Handed Heart"
- Joe Walsh – lead guitar on "Jungle Work" and "Jeannie Needs a Shooter"

Technical

- Ernie Sheesley, Niko Bolas, Serge Reyes – engineers
- Jimmy Wachtel – cover
- George Gruel, Jimmy Wachtel, Michael Curtis – photography

== Charts ==
Sales chart performance for Bad Luck Streak in Dancing School
Chart (1980)	Position
Australian Albums (Kent Music Report)	35
New Zealand Albums (RMNZ)	46
US Billboard 200	20

== See also ==
- Letter to You, a 2020 Bruce Springsteen album, features a different song with a similar title, "Janey Needs a Shooter"
- General Admission, a 2015 Machine Gun Kelly album that samples "Play it All Night Long" on the track "All Night Long"
