= Mohammed's Radio =

Song by Warren Zevon

from the album Warren Zevon
- Released: 1976
- Genre: Rock
- Length: 3:43
- Label: Asylum
- Songwriter: Warren Zevon
- Producer: Jackson Browne

"Mohammed's Radio" is a song by American singer-songwriter Warren Zevon. The song was released on his 1976 album Warren Zevon. The song was featured on A Quiet Normal Life: The Best of Warren Zevon and several other greatest hits-type albums by Zevon. Fleetwood Mac members Lindsey Buckingham and Stevie Nicks are also featured on this recording, as are Bobby Keys, Bob Glaub, and Waddy Wachtel.

By one telling, the title of the song was inspired by a Halloween parade Zevon witnessed in Aspen, Colorado in 1973. However, by another telling, Zevon simply liked the sound of the two words together. By another interpretation, it is a negative portrayal of life in Los Angeles.

== Cover versions ==
In August 1976, Susan Cowsill of the singing Cowsill family, released "Mohammed's Radio" as the B Side of her first solo single. (The A side was a cover of Carole King's "It Might As Well Rain Until September."). The single did not make the charts,

The song has been interpreted by other artists as well, most notably by Linda Ronstadt on her 1978 album Living in the USA, a track that gained airplay on album-oriented rock radio formats.. The track was also used as the B Side when her cover of Elvis Costello's "Alison" was released as a single which turned out to be a minor hit.

== Critical response ==
Music critic John Rockwell devotes pages to the song – both the Zevon original and the Ronstadt rendition – in his contribution to the Greil Marcus-edited 1979 collection of essays Stranded: Rock and Roll for a Desert Island, where among other things Rockwell describes it as "an artistic breakthrough" for Ronstadt.

A number of other books have yielded significant commentary on the song such as Philosophy Americana: Making Philosophy at Home in American Culture, Rolling Stone Interv - Rolling Stone Magazine, All Music Guide to Rock: The Definitive Guide to Rock, Pop, and Soul

Briefer references note that the song inspired an independent film in 1995 of the same title, and critic Dave Marsh put it near the top of a list of "best songs about radio".

== Personnel ==
- Warren Zevon – vocals, piano
- Stevie Nicks – backing vocals
- Lindsey Buckingham – guitar, backing vocals
- Bobby Keys – saxophone
- Bob Glaub – bass guitar
- Waddy Wachtel – guitar
- David Lindley – lap steel guitar
- Larry Zack – drums, percussion

=== Technical ===
- Jackson Browne – producer
- Ken Caillat – engineer
