= The Envoy (Warren Zevon album) =

Studio album by Warren Zevon
- Released: July 16, 1982
- Recorded: 1981
- Studios: Record One, Los Angeles, California
- Genre: Rock
- Length: 31:59
- Label: Asylum
- Producers: Warren Zevon, Greg Ladanyi, Waddy Wachtel

Warren Zevon chronology
Stand in the Fire (1981)	The Envoy (1982)	A Quiet Normal Life: The Best of Warren Zevon (1986)

Singles from The Envoy
- 1. "Let Nothing Come Between You" Released: 1982

Professional ratings
Review scores
Source	Rating
AllMusic	3/5 stars
Robert Christgau	A−
Encyclopedia of Popular Music	5/5 stars
Music Box	3.5/5 stars
Uncut	8/10

The Envoy is the fifth studio album by American singer-songwriter Warren Zevon. The album was released on July 16, 1982, by Asylum Records. The album's lack of commercial success caused Zevon's label to terminate his recording contract.

The title track was inspired by veteran American diplomat Philip Habib's shuttle diplomacy during the 1982 Lebanon War.

Zevon later said of the album's lack of success, "I would start a record more or less as soon as I'd finished the one previous to it, and they took longer, cost more and more, and actually did sort of less and less well. Particularly The Envoy. I was a little discouraged after that.".

Despite the fact that "Let Nothing Come Between You", a love ballad written by Zevon, charted as high as 24 on the Mainstream Billboard Rock chart, Asylum dropped Zevon after the commercial failure of The Envoy. It would be five years before Zevon made another studio album, 1987's Sentimental Hygiene, released on Virgin Records.

Actors Ted Shackelford and James Houghton appeared on the album's cover.

== Track listing ==
All songs written by Warren Zevon except as indicated.

Side one
No.	Title	Writer(s)	Length
1.	"The Envoy"		3:12
2.	"The Overdraft"	Thomas McGuane, Zevon	2:43
3.	"The Hula Hula Boys"		3:01
4.	"Jesus Mentioned"		2:45
5.	"Let Nothing Come Between You"		3:38

Side two
No.	Title	Writer(s)	Length
6.	"Ain't That Pretty at All"	LeRoy Marinell, Zevon	3:34
7.	"Charlie's Medicine"		4:48
8.	"Looking for the Next Best Thing"	Kenny Edwards, Marinell, Zevon	3:41
9.	"Never Too Late for Love"		4:37

Bonus Tracks (2007 reissue)
No.	Title	Writer(s)	Length
10.	"Word of Mouth" (Outtake)		4:01
11.	"Let Nothing Come Between You" (Alternate take)		3:40
12.	"The Risk" (Outtake)		2:34
13.	"Wild Thing" (Outtake)	Chip Taylor	2:29

== Personnel ==
- Warren Zevon – vocals, guitar on 1 and 7; piano on 1, 2, 5, 8, and 9; synthesizer on 1 and 5–8; electric piano on 3
- Waddy Wachtel – guitar on 1–5 and 7–9; percussion and harmony vocals on 5
- David Landau – guitar on 1, 2, 5, and 6; backing vocals on 6
- Leland Sklar – bass guitar on 1, 2, 3, 5, and 6
- Jeff Porcaro – drums on 1–3, 5, and 8; log drums on 3; puili sticks on 3

Additional personnel

- Don Henley – harmony vocals on 1
- Lindsey Buckingham – harmony vocals on 2
- Jim Horn – recorders on 3, saxophone
- Jordan Zevon – harmony vocals on 3
- Steve Lukather – guitar on 5
- Jorge Calderón – harmony vocals on 5
- Danny Kortchmar – guitar on 6
- LeRoy Marinell – guitar on 6
- Mike Botts – drums on 6
- Steve Forman – percussion on 6
- JD Souther – backing vocals on 6, harmony vocals on 8
- Bob Glaub – bass guitar on 7 and 9
- Rick Marotta – drums on 7
- Kenny Edwards – bass guitar on 8
- Graham Nash – harmony vocals on 8
- Russ Kunkel – drums on 9

Technical

- Jamie Ledner, Wayne Tadouye – engineers
- Jimmy Wachtel – design, cover photography

== Charts ==
Chart (1982)	Peak Position
Australia (Kent Music Report)	100
Billboard Pop Albums	93
