= Hasten Down the Wind (song) =

Single by Warren Zevon

from the album Warren Zevon
- Released: November 1976
- Genre: Folk rock, soft rock
- Label: Asylum Records
- Songwriter(s): Warren Zevon
- Producer(s): Warren Zevon/Jackson Browne

"Hasten Down the Wind" is a song written and recorded by Warren Zevon and featured on his eponymous major-label debut album. The song was later covered by Linda Ronstadt, who would use the song as the title track for her seventh solo LP.

The lyrics of the song describe the latter days of a relationship between a man and a woman, with the woman accepting that "nothing's working out the way they planned" before the man accepts that "she needs to be free". The track was produced by Jackson Browne, who met Zevon in the mid-seventies. Their relationship played a significant role in his career thereafter. It was with Browne's assistance that Zevon got a major record contract.

Zevon's version of the song features Phil Everly singing harmony vocals, and also David Lindley playing slide guitar.
