= Mr. Bad Example =

Studio album by Warren Zevon
- Released: October 1991
- Recorded: 1991
- Studios: The Sound Factory, Los Angeles; Dodge City, Glendale, California
- Genre: Rock
- Length: 40:15
- Label: Giant
- Producer: Waddy Wachtel

Warren Zevon chronology
Transverse City (1989)	Mr. Bad Example (1991)	Learning to Flinch (1993)

Singles from Mr. Bad Example
- 1. "Finishing Touches" Released: 1991; 2. "Searching for a Heart" Released: 1991

Mr. Bad Example is the eighth studio album by the American musician Warren Zevon, released through Giant Records in October 1991. Zevon supported the album with a North American tour, with Odds serving as both opener and backing band.

== Production ==
Mr. Bad Example was produced by Waddy Wachtel. Los Angeles session musicians contributed to the album. Zevon sometimes struggled for songwriting ideas, but always finished a song once he had started.

Dwight Yoakam provided backing vocals on "Heartache Spoken Here"; Dan Dugmore played pedal steel. David Lindley played a variety of instruments on "Quite Ugly One Morning". "Searching for a Heart" appeared on the soundtrack to the film Love at Large.

== Critical reception ==
Professional ratings
Review scores
Source	Rating
AllMusic	3/5 stars
Calgary Herald	C
Chicago Tribune	2.5/4 stars
The Encyclopedia of Popular Music	3/5 stars
Rolling Stone	3/5 stars
Uncut	8/10
Vancouver Sun	4/5 stars

The Boston Globe called Mr. Bad Example "a wonderful, resonant album, eclectic and accessible." The Chicago Tribune deemed it "a return to the terse guitar-drums-keyboard format of [Zevon's] '70s albums." The Sun Sentinel considered it to be "pure, earthy rock accessibly colored by Zevon's typically wry imagery."

The Calgary Herald wrote that "Zevon's become a somewhat torpid renegade wailing away about his rebellion while safely ensconced in L.A. security." The Austin American-Statesman determined that "Zevon's first-person characters on this record are shocking, reprehensible and relentlessly slapstick."

== Track listing ==
All tracks composed by Warren Zevon, except where indicated.

Side one
No.	Title	Writer(s)	Length
1.	"Finishing Touches"		4:05
2.	"Suzie Lightning"		4:04
3.	"Model Citizen"	LeRoy Marinell, Waddy Wachtel, Zevon	4:39
4.	"Angel Dressed in Black"	Julia Mueller, Waddy Wachtel, Zevon	4:24
5.	"Mr. Bad Example"	Jorge Calderón, Zevon	3:22
6.	"Renegade"		4:51
7.	"Heartache Spoken Here"		3:48
8.	"Quite Ugly One Morning"		3:53
9.	"Things to Do in Denver When You're Dead"	LeRoy Marinell, Waddy Wachtel, Zevon	2:53
10.	"Searching for a Heart"		4:16

== Personnel ==
- Warren Zevon – guitar, keyboards, vocals
- Jorge Calderón – bass guitar on "Mr. Bad Example", "Quite Ugly One Morning" and "Things to Do in Denver When You're Dead", harmony vocals
- Dan Dugmore – guitar on "Model Citizen", pedal steel on "Heartache Spoken Here"
- Bob Glaub – bass guitar
- Jim Keltner – drums on "Mr. Bad Example" and "Things to Do in Denver When You're Dead"
- Tito Larriva – harmony vocals on "Angel Dressed in Black"
- Kipp Lennon – harmony vocals on "Searching for a Heart"
- Mark Lennon – harmony vocals on "Searching for a Heart"
- Michael Lennon – harmony vocals on "Searching for a Heart"
- David Lindley – fiddle on "Renegade", saz, lap steel guitar, cümbüş on "Quite Ugly One Morning"
- Jeff Porcaro – drums on all tracks except "Things to Do in Denver When You're Dead"
- Waddy Wachtel – guitar, harmony vocals
- Dwight Yoakam – harmony vocals on "Heartache Spoken Here"
- Jordan Zevon – harmony vocals

Production

- Producer – Waddy Wachtel
- Engineer – Marc DeSisto
- Assistant engineers – Andrew Ballard, Scott Blockland, Jeffrey Shannon, Brian Soucy
- Mixing – Niko Bolas, John Beverly Jones
- Dave Collins – Mastering
- Technical assistance – Peggy McAfee, Tom Smyth
- Art Direction and design – Jeri Heiden
- Photography – Diego Uchitel, Jimmy Wachtel

== Charts ==
Weekly chart performance for Mr. Bad Example
Chart (2025)	Peak position
Hungarian Physical Albums (MAHASZ)	39
