= Sentimental Hygiene =

Studio album by Warren Zevon
- Released: August 29, 1987
- Recorded: 1987
- Studios: Record One (Los Angeles); A&M (Hollywood); Cheshire Sound (Atlanta)
- Genres: Rock, hard rock, alternative rock, folk rock
- Length: 36:49
- Language: English
- Label: Virgin
- Producers: Warren Zevon, Niko Bolas, Andrew Slater

Warren Zevon chronology
A Quiet Normal Life: The Best of Warren Zevon (1986)	Sentimental Hygiene (1987)	Transverse City (1989)

Singles from Sentimental Hygiene
- 1. "Sentimental Hygiene" Released: 1987; 2. "Boom Boom Mancini" Released: 1987; 3. "Reconsider Me" Released: 1987; 4. "Detox Mansion" Released: 1987; 5. "Bad Karma" Released: 1987; 6. "Leave My Monkey Alone" Released: 1987

Professional ratings
Review scores
Source	Rating
AllMusic	4.5/5 stars
Robert Christgau	A−
The Encyclopedia of Popular Music	4/5 stars
Rolling Stone	(favorable)
Uncut	8/10

Sentimental Hygiene is the sixth studio album by rock singer-songwriter Warren Zevon and his first "sober" one. The album was released on August 29, 1987, by Virgin Records. The release of Sentimental Hygiene marked the first studio album for Zevon in five years. It produced the single "Reconsider Me", as well as the dance single "Leave My Monkey Alone". The band on the album includes guitarist Peter Buck, bassist Mike Mills and drummer Bill Berry (all of R.E.M.), who also recorded an album of covers with Zevon (under the name “Hindu Love Gods”) at this time.

The single version of "Leave My Monkey Alone" was extended to 10:34 minutes and included a remix by the Latin Rascals (Albert Cabrera and Tony Moran) and the non-album track, "Nocturne".

"Even a Dog Can Shake Hands" was used as the opening theme music for the short-lived Fox comedy series Action. The song was co-written by Buck, Berry and Mills. Michael Stipe, lead singer of R.E.M., appears on the song "Bad Karma". The album also features contributions by Bob Dylan, playing harmonica on “The Factory”, and Neil Young playing lead guitar on “Sentimental Hygiene”.

The song "Boom Boom Mancini" was inspired by boxer Ray Mancini and his contest against Bobby Chacon.

== Track listing ==
All tracks composed by Warren Zevon, except where indicated.

Side one
No.	Title	Writer(s)	Length
1.	"Sentimental Hygiene"		5:06
2.	"Boom Boom Mancini"		4:54
3.	"The Factory"		2:45
4.	"Trouble Waiting to Happen"	JD Souther, Zevon	3:32
5.	"Reconsider Me"		3:09

Side two
No.	Title	Writer(s)	Length
6.	"Detox Mansion"	Jorge Calderón, Zevon	3:15
7.	"Bad Karma"		3:15
8.	"Even a Dog Can Shake Hands"	Bill Berry, Peter Buck, Mike Mills, Zevon	3:26
9.	"The Heartache"		3:19
10.	"Leave My Monkey Alone"		4:12

== Personnel ==
- Warren Zevon – acoustic guitar, bass guitar, guitar, piano, keyboards, emulator, vocals
- Bill Berry – drums
- Peter Buck – guitar
- Mike Mills – bass guitar
- Jorge Calderón – bass guitar on "Sentimental Hygiene"; harmony on "Detox Mansion"
- Mike Campbell – guitar on "Reconsider Me"
- Darius Degher – sitar on "Bad Karma"
- Bob Dylan – harmonica on "The Factory"
- Amp Fiddler – keyboards on "Leave My Monkey Alone"
- Flea – bass guitar on "Leave My Monkey Alone"
- Don Henley – harmony on "Trouble Waiting to Happen"
- DeWayne "Blackbyrd" McKnight – guitar on "Leave My Monkey Alone"
- Craig Krampf – drums on "Reconsider Me" and "Leave My Monkey Alone"
- Tony Levin – bass guitar on "Reconsider Me"
- David Lindley – lap steel guitar on "Detox Mansion", bowed saz on "Bad Karma"
- Stan Lynch – harmony on "Bad Karma"
- Rick Richards – guitar on "Even a Dog Can Shake Hands"
- Brian Setzer – lead guitar on "Trouble Waiting to Happen"
- Leland Sklar – bass guitar on "The Heartache"
- Michael Stipe – harmony on "Bad Karma"
- Waddy Wachtel – acoustic guitar on "Sentimental Hygiene", "Reconsider Me" and "The Heartache"
- Jennifer Warnes – harmony on "The Heartache"
- Jai Winding – keyboards on "Reconsider Me"
- Neil Young – lead guitar on "Sentimental Hygiene"
- Will Alexander, Brian Bell – computer programming on "Leave My Monkey Alone"

=== Production ===
- Producer: Warren Zevon, Niko Bolas, Andrew Slater
- Engineer: Duncan Aldrich, Niko Bolas, Richard Bosworth
- Assistant Engineer: Richard Cottrell, Richard Landers, Bob Levy, Mark McKenna, Dan Nash, Bob Vogt
- Mixing: Niko Bolas, Larry Ferguson, Shelly Yakus
- Mastering: Stephen Marcussen
- Arranger: Niko Bolas, George Clinton, Larry Ferguson
- Emulator: Warren Zevon
- Programming and computers: Willie Alexander, Brian Bell
- Art Direction: Jeffrey Kent Ayeroff, Margo Chase
- Cover Photo: Herb Ritts

== Charts ==
Sales chart performance for Sentimental Hygiene
Chart (1987)	Peak Position
Australia (Kent Music Report)	42
