= Desperados Under the Eaves =

Single by Warren Zevon

from the album Warren Zevon
- Released: 1976
- Genre: Rock
- Length: 4:47
- Label: Asylum
- Songwriter: Warren Zevon

"Desperados Under the Eaves" is a song written and performed by Warren Zevon from his eponymous 1976 album.

The song describes the narrator's growing alcoholism. Said LA Weekly: "Cooped up in his shitty motel room with the shakes, a drink-desperate Zevon wittily narrates his frustration with L.A.'s refusal to give anyone a free pass. Even if it sinks into the ocean, the city will still get its due. You may hate it here, but you can't escape ('Heaven help the one who leaves') so long as you're empty-handed." Journalist James Campion would comment on the song's similar themes and possible influence on 1977's "Hotel California" by the Eagles, noting Glenn Frey and Don Henley were likely familiar with "Desperados Under the Eaves" through their involvement as guest musicians on other songs throughout Warren Zevon's self titled 1976 album.

This song features background vocals from Carl Wilson and Billy Hinsche of The Beach Boys as well as Jackson Browne and JD Souther. When conducting the string section for the song, Zevon kept the veteran players "on his side" with pre-written humor. Zevon has said in interviews that it is one of his most personal songs.

LA Weekly listed the song as number 10 in its list of "The 20 Best Songs Ever Written About L.A."
