= Warren Zevon (album) =

Studio album by Warren Zevon
- Released: May 18, 1976
- Recorded: 1975–76
- Studios: Sunset Sound, Los Angeles; Elektra, Los Angeles
- Genres: Rock; pop; soft rock
- Length: 37:45
- Label: Asylum
- Producer: Jackson Browne

Warren Zevon chronology
Wanted Dead or Alive (1970)	Warren Zevon (1976)	Excitable Boy (1978)

Singles from Warren Zevon
- 1. "Hasten Down the Wind" Released: Nov 1976; 2. "I'll Sleep When I'm Dead" Released: 1976

Warren Zevon is the second studio album by American musician Warren Zevon. This album was recorded in 1975 and released on May 18, 1976, by Asylum Records. A remastered version of the album with bonus tracks was released in 2008 by Rhino Records.

== Background ==
After dropping out of high school, Warren Zevon had some modest commercial success as a songwriter. His song "Outside Chance" was recorded and released by the Turtles in 1966, when Zevon was nineteen. Three years later, his song "She Quit Me" was re-recorded as "He Quit Me" by Lesley Miller and released on the Midnight Cowboy soundtrack. However, his first studio album, Wanted Dead or Alive (1970), had not done well. Zevon and his wife, Crystal, bought one-way tickets to Spain, hoping to start over. They were persuaded to come back to Los Angeles, and the music business, by a postcard from Jackson Browne.

== Production ==
Browne produced the album. Contributors to the album included: Lindsey Buckingham, Stevie Nicks, Don Henley, Glenn Frey, Phil Everly, Bonnie Raitt, and Carl Wilson of the Beach Boys.

The cover photo depicts Zevon standing in the dark in the parking lot outside of the Hollywood Palladium. It was taken by Jimmy Wachtel on the same night as the 18th Annual Grammy Awards).

== Critical reception ==
Professional ratings
Review scores
Source	Rating
AllMusic	4.5/5 stars
Christgau's Record Guide	B+
The Encyclopedia of Popular Music	4/5 stars
Pitchfork	10/10
PopMatters	9/10
Rolling Stone	(positive)
Uncut	9/10

Reviewing in Christgau's Record Guide: Rock Albums of the Seventies (1981), Robert Christgau wrote: "I am suspicious of singer-songwriters who draw attention to phrases like 'hasten down the wind,' and I would suggest a moratorium on songs about the James Brothers that don't also rhyme 'pollution' and 'solution.' But I like the way Zevon resists pigeonholes like 'country-rock' while avoiding both the banal and the mystagogical, and I like quatrains like: 'And if California slides into the ocean/Like the mystics and statistics say it will/I predict this motel will be standing/Until I pay my bill.'"

In 2023, Pitchfork gave the album a 10/10 rating. Reviewer Andy Cush praised the album's songwriting and described "Desperadoes Under the Eaves" as Zevon's "single greatest song."

== Track listing ==
All songs written by Warren Zevon.

Side one
No.	Title	Length
1.	"Frank and Jesse James"	4:33
2.	"Mama Couldn't Be Persuaded"	2:53
3.	"Backs Turned Looking Down the Path"	2:27
4.	"Hasten Down the Wind"	2:58
5.	"Poor Poor Pitiful Me"	3:04
6.	"The French Inhaler"	3:44

Side two
No.	Title	Length
7.	"Mohammed's Radio"	3:40
8.	"I'll Sleep When I'm Dead"	2:56
9.	"Carmelita"	3:32
10.	"Join Me in L.A."	3:13
11.	"Desperados Under the Eaves"	4:45

== Personnel ==
=== Musicians ===
- Warren Zevon – harmonica, piano, rhythm guitar, string arrangements, vocals
- Jackson Browne – harmony vocals on tracks 2, 3 & 11, piano on track 10, slide guitar on track 3
- Lindsey Buckingham – guitar on track 3, harmony vocals on tracks 5 & 7
- Rosemary Butler – harmony vocals on track 10
- Jorge Calderón – harmony vocals on tracks 8 & 11
- Marty David – bass guitar on track 3
- Ned Doheny – guitar on track 10
- Phil Everly – harmony vocals on tracks 1 & 4
- Glenn Frey – rhythm guitar on track 9, harmony vocals on tracks 6 & 9
- The Gentlemen Boys – background vocals on track 11
- Bob Glaub – bass guitar on tracks 1, 2, 4–7 & 9–11
- Don Henley – harmony vocals on track 6
- Billy Hinsche – harmony vocals on track 11
- Bobby Keys – saxophone on tracks 5, 7 & 10
- David Lindley – banjo on track 1, fiddle on tracks 1, 2 & 5, slide guitar on tracks 4 & 7, guitar on track 9
- Gary Mallaber – drums on tracks 3 & 8
- Roy Marinell – bass guitar on track 8
- Stevie Nicks – vocals on track 7 & 10
- Bonnie Raitt – harmony vocals on track 10
- Fritz Richmond – jug on track 8
- Sid Sharp – strings on tracks 4, 6 & 11
- JD Souther – harmony vocals on tracks 2 & 11
- Waddy Wachtel – guitar, vocals
- Carl Wilson – harmony vocals on track 11, vocal arrangements
- Jai Winding – piano on track 5, organ & synthesizer on track 10, vocals on track 11
- Larry Zack – drums on tracks 1, 2, 4–7 & 9–11
- The Gentlemen Boys consisted of: Jackson Browne, Jorge Calderón, Kenny Edwards, JD Souther and Waddy Wachtel.

=== Production ===
- Producer: Jackson Browne
- Engineer: Fritz Richmond
- Mixing: John Haeny
- Arranger: Warren Zevon
- Vocal Arrangement: Carl Wilson

== Charts ==
Chart performance for Warren Zevon
Chart (1976)	Peak position
US Billboard Top LPs & Tape	189
