= Excitable Boy =

Studio album by Warren Zevon
- Released: January 18, 1978
- Recorded: 1977
- Studio: The Sound Factory (Los Angeles)
- Genre: Rock
- Length: 31:29
- Label: Asylum
- Producers: Jackson Browne; Waddy Wachtel

Warren Zevon chronology
Warren Zevon (1976)	Excitable Boy (1978)	Bad Luck Streak in Dancing School (1980)

Singles from Excitable Boy
- 1. "Johnny Strikes Up the Band" Released: 1978; 2. "Excitable Boy" Released: 1978; 3. "Werewolves of London" Released: January 18, 1978; 4. "Nighttime in the Switching Yard" Released: 1978; 5. "Lawyers, Guns and Money" Released: 1978

Excitable Boy is the third studio album by American musician Warren Zevon. The album was released on January 18, 1978, by Asylum Records. It includes the single "Werewolves of London", which reached No. 21 and remained in the American Top 40 for six weeks. The album brought Zevon to commercial attention and remains the best-selling album of his career, having been certified platinum by the RIAA and reaching the top ten on the US Billboard 200. A remastered and expanded edition was released in 2007.

== Music and lyrics ==
"Excitable Boy" and "Werewolves of London" were considered macabrely humorous by some critics. The historical "Veracruz" dramatizes the United States occupation of Veracruz. It was the first song Zevon wrote with Jorge Calderón. Likewise, "Roland the Headless Thompson Gunner" is a fictionalized account of former mercenary David Lindell's experiences in Africa. "Lawyers, Guns and Money" is a tongue-in-cheek tale of a young American man's adventures in Cold War-era Latin America, based on a real-life "day of improbable and grotesque mischief" Zevon experienced in Kauai. In addition, there are two ballads about life and relationships ("Accidentally Like a Martyr" and "Tenderness on the Block"), as well as the funk/disco-inspired "Nighttime in the Switching Yard".

== Critical reception ==
Professional ratings
Review scores
Source	Rating
AllMusic	4/5 stars
Christgau's Record Guide	A−
The Encyclopedia of Popular Music	4/5 stars
Music Box	4/5 stars
PopMatters	9/10
Rolling Stone	(favorable)
Uncut	9/10

Reviewing in Christgau's Record Guide: Rock Albums of the Seventies (1981), Robert Christgau wrote:

The further these songs get from Ronstadtland, the more I like them. The four that exorcise male psychoses by mock celebration are positively addictive, the two uncomplicated rockers do the job, and two of the purely 'serious' songs get by. But no one has yet been able to explain to me what 'accidentally like a martyr' might mean—answers dependent on the term 'Dylanesque' are not acceptable—and I have no doubt that that's the image Linda will home in on. After all, is she going to cover the one about the headless gunner?

The Globe and Mail panned the album, writing that Zevon's famous friends contributing to "this improbable collection of tunes is a testament to the constant in-breeding among the California types that have so deteriorated the scene out there."

== Track listing ==
All writing by Warren Zevon. Additional writers as noted.

Side one
No.	Title	Writer(s)	Length
1.	"Johnny Strikes Up the Band"		2:49
2.	"Roland the Headless Thompson Gunner"	David Lindell	3:47
3.	"Excitable Boy"	LeRoy Marinell	2:40
4.	"Werewolves of London"	Marinell, Waddy Wachtel	3:27
5.	"Accidentally Like a Martyr"		3:37

Side two
No.	Title	Writer(s)	Length
6.	"Nighttime in the Switching Yard"	Jorge Calderón, Lindell, Wachtel	4:15
7.	"Veracruz"	Calderón	3:30
8.	"Tenderness on the Block"	Jackson Browne	3:55
9.	"Lawyers, Guns and Money"		3:29

Bonus tracks (2007 reissue)
No.	Title	Writer(s)	Length
10.	"I Need a Truck" (outtake)		0:50
11.	"Werewolves of London" (alternate version)	Wachtel, Marinell	3:41
12.	"Tule's Blues" (solo piano version)		3:13
13.	"Frozen Notes" (strings version)		1:59

== Personnel ==
- Warren Zevon – lead, harmony and backing vocals, piano, organ, synthesizer
- Jorge Calderón – harmony and backing vocals, Spanish vocals on "Veracruz"
- Danny Kortchmar – guitar, percussion
- Russ Kunkel – drums

=== Additional personnel ===
- Karla Bonoff – harmony vocals on "Accidentally Like a Martyr"
- JD Souther – backing and harmony vocals
- Jennifer Warnes – harmony vocals on "Excitable Boy"
- Linda Ronstadt – backing and harmony vocals on "Excitable Boy"
- Jackson Browne – guitar, harmony and backing vocals
- Waddy Wachtel – guitar, synthesizer, harmony and backing vocals
- Kenny Edwards – bass guitar on "Veracruz", "Tenderness on the Block" and "Lawyers, Guns and Money"
- John McVie – bass on "Werewolves of London"
- Bob Glaub – bass guitar on "Roland the Headless Gunner", "Excitable Boy" and "Nighttime in the Switching Yard"
- Leland Sklar – bass guitar on "Johnny Strikes Up The Band" and "Accidentally Like a Martyr"
- Mick Fleetwood – drums on "Werewolves of London"
- Rick Marotta – drums on "Veracruz" and "Lawyers, Guns and Money"
- Jeff Porcaro – drums and percussion on "Nighttime in the Switching Yard"
- Luis Damian – jarana on "Veracruz"
- Arthur Gerst – Mexican harp
- Jim Horn – recorder on "Veracruz"; saxophone on "Excitable Boy"
- Greg Ladanyi – bells on "Nighttime in the Switching Yard"
- Manuel Vasquez – requinto on "Veracruz"

=== Technical ===
- Jackson Browne, Waddy Wachtel – producers
- Greg Ladanyi, Dennis Kirk – engineers
- George Ybarra, Serge Reyes – assistant engineers
- Jimmy Wachtel – album design, photography
- Crystal Zevon, Lorrie Sullivan – additional photography

== Charts ==
=== Weekly charts ===
Chart (1978)	Peak position
Australian Albums (Kent Music Report)	9
Canada Top Albums/CDs (RPM)	14
New Zealand Albums (RMNZ)	12
US Billboard 200	8

=== Year-end charts ===
Chart (1978)	Position
Canada Top Albums/CDs (RPM)	78
US Billboard 200	54

== Certifications ==
Organization	Level	Date
RIAA – U.S.	Gold	April 17, 1978
CRIA – Canada	Gold	June 1, 1978
RIAA – U.S.	Platinum	November 7, 1997
