= Lawyers, Guns and Money =

Single by Warren Zevon

from the album Excitable Boy
- Released: July 1978
- Recorded: 1977
- Length: 3:29
- Label: Asylum
- Songwriter: Warren Zevon
- Producers: Jackson Browne, Waddy Wachtel

"Lawyers, Guns and Money" is a song by Warren Zevon, and the closing track on his 1978 album Excitable Boy.

Zevon composed the song based on a real-life incident he had experienced while vacationing on Kauai. The "long day of improbable and grotesque mischief" prompted him never to take vacations again in his lifetime.

Record World called it "rock 'n' roll at its angriest."

== Plot ==
The story is told from the perspective of a man whose one-night stand with an undercover Russian waitress embroils him in Cold War espionage involving "gambling in Havana" and going into hiding in Honduras. Its title comes from the singer calling his father with the instructions to extricate him out of trouble: "Send lawyers, guns and money."

== Versions ==
An edited version of the song was released as a single and this edited version is on the A Quiet Normal Life best of compilation on the physical CD and LP, although the lyrics on the rear cover are the full un-edited version. The digital download and streaming version of the compilation use the album version.

== Covers ==
The song was first covered by Rick Derringer on the 1978 album If I Weren't So Romantic, I'd Shoot You and was released as a single. It was also covered by Hank Williams Jr. in 1983 for his album Five-O and released as the B-side of his single "I'm for Love". Meat Loaf covered the song on his 1999 live album VH1 Storytellers. It was later covered by The Wallflowers on the album Enjoy Every Sandwich: The Songs of Warren Zevon in 2004. It has also been covered by Micky & The Motorcars, with a recording of it on their 2009 album Live at Billy Bob's Texas, and is regularly played live by Widespread Panic. In April 2025, Zach Bryan covered the song at Stagecoach Festival. Bryan also covered it at Gilette Stadium on October 2nd, 2026 with members of Zevon’s family in attendance. He called it “one of the greatest songs ever written.” The Killers performed the song at Zevon's induction into the Rock and Roll Hall of Fame, using Zevon's own guitar.

== Uses in popular culture ==
The song lent its title to a light-hearted radio program on the Melbourne community radio station 3RRR, which looked at the legal fraternity in the city. The program started in 1985 and ran for several years, hosted by the pseudonymous duo "Donoghue & Stevenson"—Dennis Connell and Ross Stevenson. The song was used as both intro and exit music for the program.

In the movie Grand Canyon, Kevin Kline is listening to this song in his car when a gang approaches to menace him.

The song was used for the opening of the show Justice, with Victor Garber, in 2006.

The third episode of the HBO series The Staircase, as well as the documentary Boom! Boom! The World vs. Boris Becker featured the song for their end credits.

In Michael Connelly's 1997 novel Trunk Music, protagonist Harry Bosch references the song as an unofficial anthem from his days on Patrol with the LAPD

The 2026 video game Grand Theft Auto VI includes "Lawyers, Guns and Money" on its V-Rock FM in-game radio station. Collider named it one of the 10 best songs in Grand Theft Auto VI, noting "Warren Zevon has a deserved cult following, but probably deserves even more popularity."
