= Jordan Zevon =

American singer, musician and songwriter

- Born: August 7, 1969 (age 57)
- Genres: Rock, Acoustic
- Occupations: Musician, Vocalist, Songwriter
- Instruments: Vocals, Guitar
- Label: New West Records
- Website: http://www.JordanZevon.com

Jordan Zevon (born August 7, 1969) is an American singer, musician and songwriter. He is the son of rock musician Warren Zevon.

== Career ==
Zevon was executive producer for the motion picture $pent (2000).

Following his father's death in 2003, Jordan, his half-sister, Ariel, and longtime Zevon collaborator Jorge Calderón accepted Warren's two posthumous Grammy Awards for Best Rock Vocal Performance and Best Contemporary Folk Album for The Wind.

He appeared on the 2004 tribute album Enjoy Every Sandwich: Songs of Warren Zevon singing the previously unreleased song "Studebaker".

In 2005, he appeared on another tribute album called Hurry Home Early: the Songs of Warren Zevon, issued by Wampus Multimedia, where he sang another unreleased song called "Warm Rain" with Simone Stevens.

In 2005, Zevon released his self-titled debut EP through his production company Mixed Headache. His first full-length album, Insides Out, was released through Texas-based New West Records on April 15, 2008.

On June 7, 2007, Zevon appeared on the Late Show with David Letterman and again on April 18, 2008.

In 2008, he won the Overall Grand Prize of the prestigious 14th Annual USA Songwriting Competition with his song "Home".

== Advocacy ==
Jordan is a national spokesman for the Asbestos Disease Awareness Organization. Proceeds from the October 2025 tribute concert to his father, who died from an asbestos-related pleural mesothelioma, went to the organization, alongside the Ed Asner Family Foundation.

== Discography ==
- Jordan Zevon (EP) (2005)
- Insides Out (2008)

== Honors ==
- Overall Grand Prize — U.S.A. Songwriting Competition – "Home" 2008
- Best Pop Song — U.S.A. Songwriting Competition - "Home" 2008
- Best Pop Song — U.S.A. Songwriting Competition – "Jokes On Me" 2006
- 3rd Prize Overall — U.S.A. Songwriting Competition – "Insides Out" 2006
