= Jorge Calderón =

Puerto Rican musician

- Origin: San Juan, Puerto Rico, US
- Genres: Rock
- Occupation(s): Musician, songwriter, producer
- Instrument(s): Guitar, bass, background vocals
- Years active: 1970s-present
- Labels: Warner Bros.

Jorge Calderón, originally from San Juan, Puerto Rico, is an American multi-instrumentalist, songwriter and record producer best known for his collaborations with Warren Zevon and Buckingham Nicks. Calderón sings, and also plays guitar, bass guitar and percussion.

He began working with Buckingham Nicks in 1972 as a percussionist. He toured with the band until they disbanded in 1975. He later worked with Fleetwood Mac, recording and writing a song, "Kiss and Run". The song was released on the 2004 remastered version of Tusk.

Calderón worked extensively with Warren Zevon, having performance and/or songwriting credits on a total of eleven of Zevon's studio albums from Warren Zevon (1976) to his final album The Wind (2003), which Calderón also co-produced. Calderón did not perform on Zevon's My Ride's Here (2002), but did co-produce the posthumous tribute album Enjoy Every Sandwich: Songs of Warren Zevon.

Calderón released two solo albums. City Music was issued by Warner Bros. Records in 1975. In September 2018, Calderón released a new album Blue Rhythm Highway on Inside Recordings featuring Ry Cooder, David Lindley, Jim Keltner and Van Dyke Parks, among others. Tracks include "Blue City", "Down by the Breadfruit Trees", "Sky Blue Chevrolet" and "Deeper Blue".
