= The Lost World: Jurassic Park =

1997 film directed by Steven Spielberg

- Theatrical release poster
- Directed by: Steven Spielberg
- Screenplay by: David Koepp
- Based on: The Lost World by Michael Crichton
- Produced by: Gerald R. Molen; Colin Wilson
- Starring: Jeff Goldblum; Julianne Moore; Pete Postlethwaite; Arliss Howard
- Cinematography: Janusz Kamiński
- Edited by: Michael Kahn
- Music by: John Williams
- Production companies: Universal Pictures; Amblin Entertainment
- Distributed by: Universal Pictures
- Release dates: May 19, 1997 (Los Angeles premiere); May 23, 1997 (United States)
- Running time: 129 minutes
- Country: United States
- Language: English
- Budget: $73–75 million
- Box office: $618.6 million

The Lost World: Jurassic Park is a 1997 American science fiction action film directed by Steven Spielberg from a screenplay by David Koepp. It is the second film in the Jurassic Park franchise and the original Jurassic Park trilogy, and is loosely based on Michael Crichton's 1995 novel The Lost World. Jeff Goldblum, Richard Attenborough, Joseph Mazzello and Ariana Richards reprise their roles from the original film with Julianne Moore, Pete Postlethwaite, Vince Vaughn and Arliss Howard joining the cast.

Four years after the original film, John Hammond (Attenborough) loses control of his company InGen to his nephew, Peter Ludlow (Howard). On the verge of bankruptcy, Ludlow intends to exploit dinosaurs from InGen's second island, Isla Sorna with plans for a new dinosaur theme park in San Diego. Hammond sends a team, led by the eccentric chaos theorist and mathematician Ian Malcolm (Goldblum), to the island to document the dinosaurs and encourage non-interference, although the two groups eventually come into conflict.

After the original novel's release and the first film's success, fans pressured Crichton for a sequel. Following the book's publication in 1995, production began on a film sequel. Filming took place from September to December 1996, primarily in California with a shoot in Kauai, Hawaii, where the first film was shot. The Lost World's plot and imagery is substantially darker than Jurassic Park. It makes more extensive use of CGI to depict the dinosaurs, along with life-sized animatronics.

Among the most anticipated films of the year, The Lost World was accompanied by a $250 million marketing campaign, which included video games, comic books, and toys. Released on May 23, 1997 by Universal Pictures, the film received mixed reviews from critics, who praised the action set pieces and visual effects but criticized the character development and the film, ever since its original 1997 release, has been compared unfavorably with many other Spielberg-directed films (including the 1993 original film) with a small number of critics even believing it to be Spielberg's worst film effort as a director. Spielberg also expressed disappointment with the film, stating he had become increasingly disenchanted with it during production. It grossed $618.6 million worldwide, becoming the second-highest-grossing film of 1997 (behind Titanic) and was nominated for numerous awards, including an Academy Award nomination for Best Visual Effects but lost the award to Titanic. A sequel, Jurassic Park III, was released in 2001. Goldblum later reprised his role as Malcolm in Jurassic World: Fallen Kingdom (2018) and Jurassic World Dominion (2022).

== Plot ==
Four years after the events on Isla Nublar, (Note: As depicted in Jurassic Park (1993).) a British family anchors their yacht off a beach on Isla Sorna and comes ashore, unaware of the genetically engineered dinosaurs on the island. Their daughter, Cathy Bowman, wanders off and is attacked by a pack of Compsognathus but survives the encounter.

Peter Ludlow, nephew of Dr. John Hammond, uses the incident to oust Hammond and gain control of InGen. The company's second facility, "Site B" on Isla Sorna, was where the dinosaurs were cloned before moving them to the park in Nublar, but the island was abandoned during a hurricane several years earlier. Ludlow plans to exploit Isla Sorna's dinosaurs to save InGen, prompting Hammond to request Dr. Ian Malcolm's help in documenting the creatures to promote a non-interference policy. Ian's girlfriend, paleontologist Dr. Sarah Harding, is already on Isla Sorna, leading Ian to reluctantly agree to go, but only to retrieve her. Ian travels to Isla Sorna with equipment specialist and engineer Eddie Carr and video documentarian and activist Nick Van Owen. They find Sarah and discover that Ian's daughter Kelly has stowed away in their research trailer. Ludlow and a mercenary team arrive on the island to capture dinosaurs, with help from big-game hunters Roland Tembo and Ajay Sidhu.

Ian's group realizes that Ludlow intends to ship the captured specimens to San Diego for a new Jurassic Park, using a nearly finished amphitheater that Hammond abandoned in favor of the Isla Nublar site. Nick and Sarah free the captured dinosaurs, and the animals wreak havoc on the InGen team's camp. On the way back to the trailer, Nick rescues an injured Tyrannosaurus rex infant that Roland used as bait to hunt its father. Knowing this will bring the baby's parents to them, Ian takes Kelly to safety and returns to the trailer to warn Sarah and Nick. They successfully treat the infant, but the parents arrive, having tracked the infant's scent. The adult Tyrannosaurs reclaim their infant and destroy the trailer by overturning and pushing it partially over the cliff before leaving the area. Eddie arrives with a rope to rescue them and attempts to pull the trailer back up with his SUV, but the engine noise attracts the attention of both Tyrannosaur adults again, where they tear Eddie's SUV apart, and devour him.

Ian, Sarah, and Nick are rescued by Ludlow's team and forced to work together since both groups lost all their communication equipment in separate attacks. They decide to travel to an abandoned InGen base to call for help. After the team sets up a camp, they are ambushed by the Tyrannosaurus adults, who were led to the camp by the scent of the infant tyrannosaurus' blood on Sarah's jacket. The party flees into a field of long grass where a pack of Velociraptors ambush them, killing Ajay and most of the team. Ian's group reaches the InGen base, fights off the Velociraptors, and successfully radios for helicopter extraction. Nick reveals that he stole Roland's bullets to prevent him from killing his trophy. However, Roland has sedated the male Tyrannosaurus with tranquilizers. As InGen personnel arrive to secure the male and infant, Roland declines Ludlow's job offer at the San Diego park, reflecting on Ajay's death and the morality of Ludlow's scheme.

At the Port of San Diego, Ian and Sarah attempt to convince Ludlow to abandon his plans, but the ship carrying the male Tyrannosaurus suddenly crashes into the docks. The crew is found dead, and the adult is accidentally released and rampages throughout the city. Ian and Sarah locate the infant at the planned park and use it to lure the adult back into the cargo hold of the ship that brought him. Ludlow tries to retrieve the infant but the male incapacitates him and gives him to the infant to be its first kill. Sarah uses a tranquilizer gun to sedate the male and Ian closes the hold's doors.

In the aftermath, the dinosaurs are shipped back to Isla Sorna accompanied by the U.S. Navy. Ian, Sarah, and Kelly watch Hammond in a televised interview announcing that the American and Costa Rican governments have declared the island a nature reserve. The Rex family is seen reunited, with the parents grazing with their infant in an open field.

== Cast ==
- Jeff Goldblum as Dr. Ian Malcolm: A mathematician and chaos theorist.
- Julianne Moore as Dr. Sarah Harding: Ian's girlfriend and a behavioral paleontologist.
- Pete Postlethwaite as Roland Tembo: A big-game hunter who adheres to his own strict moral code.
- Arliss Howard as Peter Ludlow: Hammond's nephew who has been appointed CEO of InGen.
- Richard Attenborough as Dr. John Hammond: The former CEO of InGen who takes steps to redeem himself after the Isla Nublar incident by preserving Isla Sorna.
- Vince Vaughn as Nick Van Owen: An experienced documentarian, photojournalist and environmentalist.
- Vanessa Lee Chester as Kelly Curtis: Ian's daughter who stows away in the support trailer to be with him.
- Peter Stormare as Dieter Stark: The second-in-command of the InGen group under the control of Roland.
- Harvey Jason as Ajay Sidhu: Roland's friend and hunting partner.
- Richard Schiff as Eddie Carr: A field equipment expert.
- Thomas F. Duffy as Dr. Robert Burke: The InGen hunters' paleontologist.
- Joseph Mazzello as Tim Murphy: Hammond's grandson.
- Ariana Richards as Lex Murphy: Tim's older sister and Hammond's granddaughter.
- Camilla Belle as Cathy Bowman: The daughter of a wealthy family that stumbles upon Isla Sorna.

== Production ==
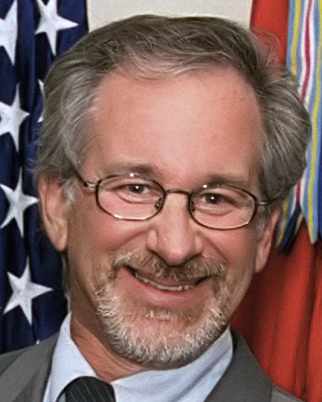
Steven Spielberg, seen in 1999, directed the original film and returned for the sequel - a decision he later regretted by his own admission

After the release of the novel Jurassic Park in 1990, author Michael Crichton was pressured by fans for a sequel. Having never written one, he initially refused. While shooting the novel's 1993 film adaptation, director Steven Spielberg believed that if a sequel film were made, it would involve the retrieval of a canister that contained dinosaur DNA lost during the events of the first film. (Note: This idea would later be explored in a rejected early draft for Jurassic Park IV.) Talk of a sequel began after the release of the first film, which was a financial success. Spielberg held discussions with David Koepp and Crichton, who both wrote the previous film, to talk about possible ideas for a sequel. The production schedule for a second Jurassic Park film was dependent on whether Crichton would write a sequel to the first novel.

In March 1994, Crichton said he had a story idea for another book, which would then be adapted into a film. At the time, Spielberg had not committed to directing the new novel's film adaptation, as he planned to take a year off from directing. In March 1995, Crichton was nearly finished writing the second novel, scheduled for release later that year. Spielberg had signed on to produce the film adaptation, with filming to begin in 1996 for release the following year. Spielberg was busy with his new DreamWorks studio and had not decided if he would direct the film, saying, "I'd love to direct it, but I just have to see. My life is changing".

A production team was assembled by mid-1995, as Crichton was finishing the second novel, titled The Lost World; simultaneously, Spielberg and Koepp were developing their own ideas for the screenplay. Crichton's novel was published that September, and Spielberg was announced as director two months later. Spielberg and Crichton agreed to forego upfront fees for a share of the back-end. Koepp's deal was said to be the most lucrative for an adaptation at the time, with a fee in the region of $1.5 to $2 million. Joe Johnston had offered to direct the film, and eventually helmed the 2001 sequel Jurassic Park III.

The storyboarding process had begun in June 1995. Like with previous Spielberg films, storyboards were heavily utilized early on to help develop sequences as well as the overall plot. As the year went on, Spielberg continued to brainstorm ideas and made rough sketches to help illustrate his vision. The Lost World: Jurassic Park had nearly 1,500 storyboards, which aided in the precise planning needed to shoot scenes involving action, dinosaurs, and special effects. The pre-production process began in January 1996. Within three months, the scenes represented in storyboards were numerous enough to create a four-hour film, necessitating the need for cuts. The InGen village on Isla Sorna was among elements of the film that underwent many design changes early on.

=== Writing ===
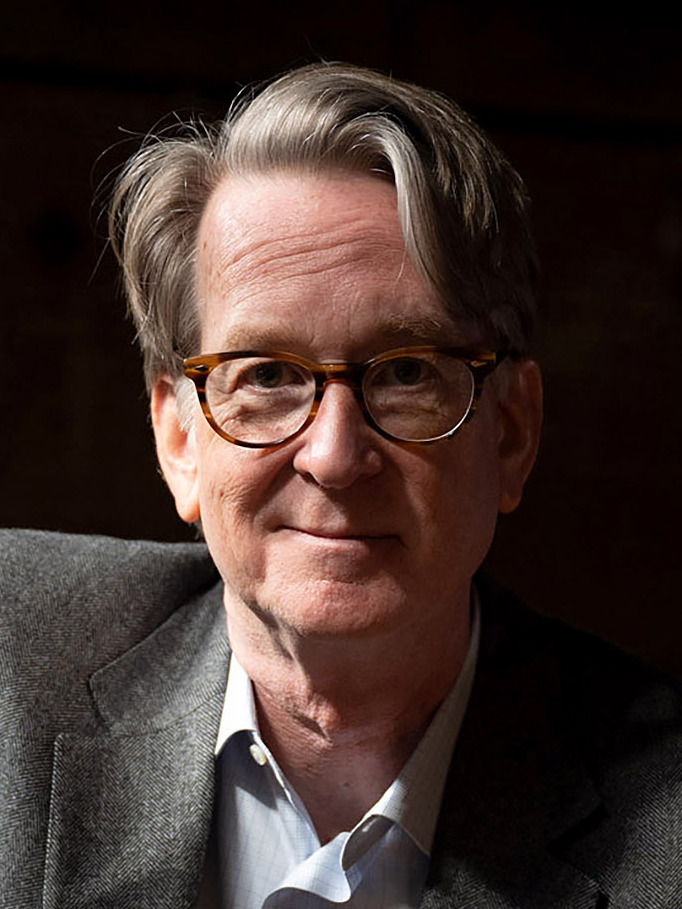
The film was written by David Koepp (pictured in 2022)

After the film adaptation of The Lost World was announced, Koepp received letters of advice from interested children. According to Koepp, one letter read: "As long as you have the T. rex and the Velociraptor, everything else is fine. But, whatever you do, don't have a long boring part at the beginning that has nothing to do with the island". Koepp retained the letter as "sort of a reminder". He also took a suggestion from the letter to add Stegosaurus into the script. Koepp began writing the screenplay in September 1995, after wrapping principal photography on his directorial debut, the 1996 film The Trigger Effect. He proceeded to work in post-production on that film while simultaneously writing The Lost World, completing the first draft in January 1996.

Koepp noted that the first Jurassic Park film was philosophical about bringing dinosaurs back to life and how they would impact humanity: "We had thoroughly explored those questions in the first movie, so I didn't want to return to them. The Lost World is less philosophical and more about basic survival". During an early meeting with Koepp, Spielberg noted that the original film provided a contrast between herbivorous and carnivorous dinosaurs. Spielberg determined that the new sequel should additionally focus on humans who are "gatherers" (observers of the dinosaurs) and "hunters" (who capture the dinosaurs for a zoo). Koepp said the plot of the 1962 film Hatari! – about African animals being captured for zoos – had "a big influence" on The Lost World's script.

The character of Robert Burke is based on paleontologist Robert Bakker, who believes that T. rex was a predator. Rival paleontologist Jack Horner, the film's technical advisor, viewed the dinosaur as being protective and not inherently aggressive. Horner requested that the character of Burke be eaten by the T. rex, although Bakker enjoyed the scene and believed that it vindicated his theory that T. rex was a predator.

The Lost World: Jurassic Park features several previously un-filmed scenes from the first novel. The death of Dieter Stark to Compsognathus was inspired by John Hammond's death in the novel, where Procompsognathus kill him. The film's opening scene came from an early chapter, in which a Procompsognathus bites a girl on a beach. The first novel also included a scene where characters hide behind a waterfall from a T. rex; this was re-used in The Lost World: Jurassic Park, for the scene in which a T. rex eats Burke.

==== Novel changes ====
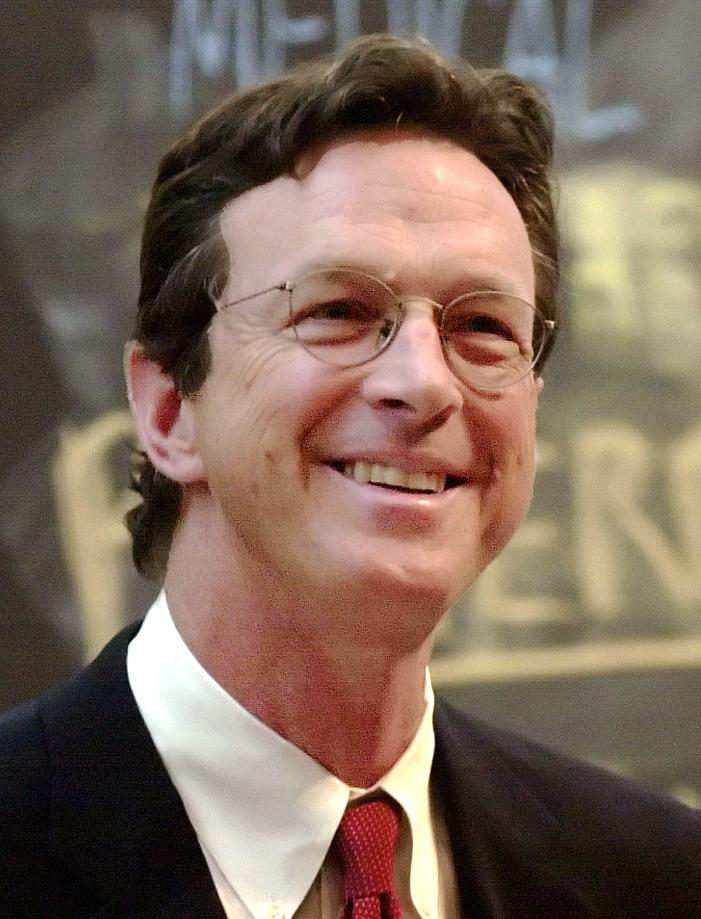
Michael Crichton, seen in 2002, wrote the novel on which the film is based

At nearly 400 pages, the novel's story needed to be condensed to fit the typical two-hour length of a film. Aside from discarding many elements of the book, Spielberg and Koepp also added their own ideas. As a result, The Lost World: Jurassic Park is only a loose adaptation of Crichton's novel. After the book was finished, Crichton was not consulted about the film adaptation, and it was not until he declined to approve certain merchandising rights that he received a copy of the script. Executive producer Kathleen Kennedy, who also produced the first film, said: "In the same way Michael doesn't see writing as a collaboration, Steven went off and did his own movie. When Michael turned the book over to Steven, he knew his work was finished".

By the time Crichton had finished his novel, Spielberg and Koepp had already been discussing ideas for the film for more than a year. Koepp attempted to combine these ideas with some from the novel. He had a year to write the script before the start of filming. To prepare, Spielberg was more insistent that Koepp watch the 1925 film, The Lost World, than he was on having him read Crichton's novel. Koepp read the book four times, in each instance taking note of aspects he liked. Spielberg said that its middle portion was lacking in story narrative, but that Crichton's "set-up was excellent, and he certainly put us on the right road."

Spielberg and Koepp devised a new story while including two ideas from the book that the director liked: a second island populated with dinosaurs, and a scene where half of a two-part trailer dangles from a cliff after being attacked by T. rexes. Also retained was the idea of parenting and nurturing behavior among dinosaurs, as well as a baby T. rex and a child who stows away in the trailer. Another concept retained from the novel is the high hide, an enclosure used by Malcolm's team that rises into the treetops for dinosaur observation. Spielberg regretted the removal of a scene from the script that would have depicted characters on motorcycles attempting to flee raptors, similar to a sequence in the novel. An alternate version of the scene was later added to the 2015 film Jurassic World.

Crichton's novel revolves around Malcolm's team and a rival team led by InGen's corporate rival, Biosyn, which was written out of the film adaptation in favor of two competing InGen teams. Several novel characters also had to be removed, including Lewis Dodgson, the leader of the Biosyn team, and field equipment engineer Doc Thorne, whose characteristics were partially implemented in the film's version of Eddie. Two new characters not featured in the novel are Roland and Nick; Koepp chose the surnames Tembo and Van Owen as a reference to one of his favorite songs, "Roland the Headless Thompson Gunner", by Warren Zevon. Koepp said "since Roland is a mercenary in the song, that seemed like a good name for the hunter-for-hire in our movie. While I was at it, I thought it would be fun to make his nemesis' last name Van Owen, like in the song".

While Crichton's novel featured two child characters, Kelly and Arby, Koepp combined them into a single character also named Kelly. Arby is a black character, and black actress Vanessa Lee Chester was chosen to play Kelly in the film. Initially, Kelly was to be a student of Ian Malcolm's, but Koepp had difficulty making this idea work, saying that Malcolm "would never teach grade school, so I thought maybe he was tutoring her. Why? Maybe he got a drunk driving ticket, and he had to do community service, so he's tutoring at this inner-city high school". Koepp scrapped this idea because of its similarity to the 1995 film Dangerous Minds.

Because the film would deal with dinosaur nurturing, Koepp realized that the parenting element should also extend to the human characters. Spielberg approved Koepp's idea to have Kelly as Malcolm's daughter, but they initially were unsure about a black actress playing the child of a white parent. Spielberg has two adopted black children, and he and Koepp soon decided to retain the idea. Koepp wanted to write an explanation into the script about the discrepancy in skin color, but he dropped this idea as he could not think of a simple way to address it.

==== Rewrites ====
Koepp wrote nine drafts for the film. A sequence in the early scripts would involve Malcolm and his group escaping raptors by hang-gliding off a cliff, only to encounter Pteranodons. The original ending involved a larger InGen village and a longer raptor chase there, followed by an aerial battle where Pteranodons attack the helicopter trying to escape Isla Sorna. As part of the ending, Spielberg also considered having the Pteranodons swoop down and carry off humans and animals in their large beaks, an idea that was rejected by Horner.

For more than a year, Spielberg and Koepp were unsure whether to include a sequence involving a dinosaur rampaging in a city. Koepp considered it a "logical extension" of the story told in the first film, and believed it was the top sequence that viewers would expect to see, but noted that he and Spielberg had gone "back and forth" on whether to include it: "The main reason not to do it had been that if it wasn't done just right, we'd suddenly be remaking Godzilla. Koepp felt the sequence would only work for a short period of time before becoming unbelievable.

Two months before the start of filming, Spielberg decided to change the ending to feature the often-discussed city rampage, eventually settling on a T. rex in San Diego. He was interested in seeing dinosaurs attacking the mainland, and believed that audiences would enjoy the San Diego rampage. Initially, Spielberg wanted to save the idea for a third Jurassic Park film, but changed his mind upon realizing he would probably not direct another installment. For the rampage sequence, Spielberg referenced monster films such as The Beast from 20,000 Fathoms and Gorgo. The sequence is similar to a scene in the 1925 version of The Lost World, in which a Brontosaurus wreaks havoc in London. Various scenarios were considered for the San Diego rampage, including one scrapped idea in which the T. rex would face off against Navy SEALs from the nearby island of Coronado.

Koepp liked the idea of a dinosaur rampage, but acknowledged that rewriting the script so close to filming was "pretty hectic", especially because it coincided with his wife giving birth. His first draft with the new ending was completed a week after Spielberg's decision, although it would continue to go through revisions. Construction of the InGen village had already been underway, and the size of the set was reduced by 75 percent as a result of the new ending. Producers Colin Wilson and Gerald R. Molen wanted the Pteranodons to remain in the story; they received only a small appearance in the film's ending shot. A funeral scene for Hammond was also cut from the final script.

=== Casting ===
In November 1994, Richard Attenborough said he would reprise his role as Hammond from the first film. Jeff Goldblum was also signed early on to return as Malcolm. Early casting efforts for the new characters began in February 1996, and fully took off a month later. In April 1996, Julianne Moore was in discussions to star alongside Goldblum, taking the role of Sarah Harding, one of the characters from the novel. Spielberg had admired Moore's performance in the 1993 film The Fugitive, and met with her shortly thereafter about appearing in one of his future films. He encouraged Koepp to write Sarah with Moore in mind for the role.

Spielberg had met Vanessa Lee Chester at the 1995 premiere of A Little Princess, in which she appeared. Chester later recalled: "As I was signing an autograph for him, he told me one day he'd put me in a film". Spielberg met with Chester the following year to discuss The Lost World: Jurassic Park, eventually casting her as Malcolm's daughter, Kelly. Pete Postlethwaite was cast after Spielberg saw his performance in the 1993 film In the Name of the Father. In June 1996, Peter Stormare was in final negotiations to join the project, after Spielberg saw him in the film Fargo, released earlier that year.

Vince Vaughn would also join the cast. Spielberg was impressed with Vaughn's performance in the 1996 film Swingers, which he saw after the filmmakers asked his permission to use music from his earlier film, Jaws. After meeting with Spielberg, Vaughn was cast without having to do a screen test. Art Malik turned down a role in the film. Indian actor M. R. Gopakumar was initially cast as Ajay Sidhu in August 1996, but was unable to participate in the project because of trouble acquiring a work visa in time for filming. He was one of six people considered for the role, which ultimately went to actor Harvey Jason.

Richard Schiff had initially auditioned for High Incident, a television series that was executive-produced by Spielberg. After viewing his audition tape, Spielberg decided to cast him in The Lost World. While filming, Spielberg came to like the character so much, he considered keeping him alive for the film. However, Schiff convinced Spielberg to go forward with the death scene: "I went, 'Well, no, I think it's better to kill me off, because then all bets are off. If you like my character, then Jeff Goldblum might be next. You never know'".

=== Filming ===
The Lost World: Jurassic Park was shot on a budget of $73–75 million. Spielberg did not allow for cast rehearsals: "You want to capture the actors when they taste the words for the first time, when they look at each other for the first time – that's the sort of magic you can only get on a first or second take". Koepp tried to be available on-set for script revisions. He also served as the film's second unit director, having volunteered for the position in hopes of gaining more directorial experience. Second unit work included establishing shots, such as people marching across Isla Sorna, and helicopter shots, in addition to a scene featuring Malcolm on a subway.

Many crew members from the first film returned for the sequel. Spielberg wanted Dean Cundey, his long-time cinematographer, to return as well, but he was busy preparing to direct Honey, We Shrunk Ourselves. Spielberg instead chose Janusz Kamiński, who worked with him on the 1993 film Schindler's List. Kamiński gave The Lost World a darker, more artistic look over its predecessor, leading to a "more elegant and rich" approach focused on contrast and shadow. Much of the film takes place at night, and Kamiński looked at the films Alien and Blade Runner for visual reference.

==== Locations ====
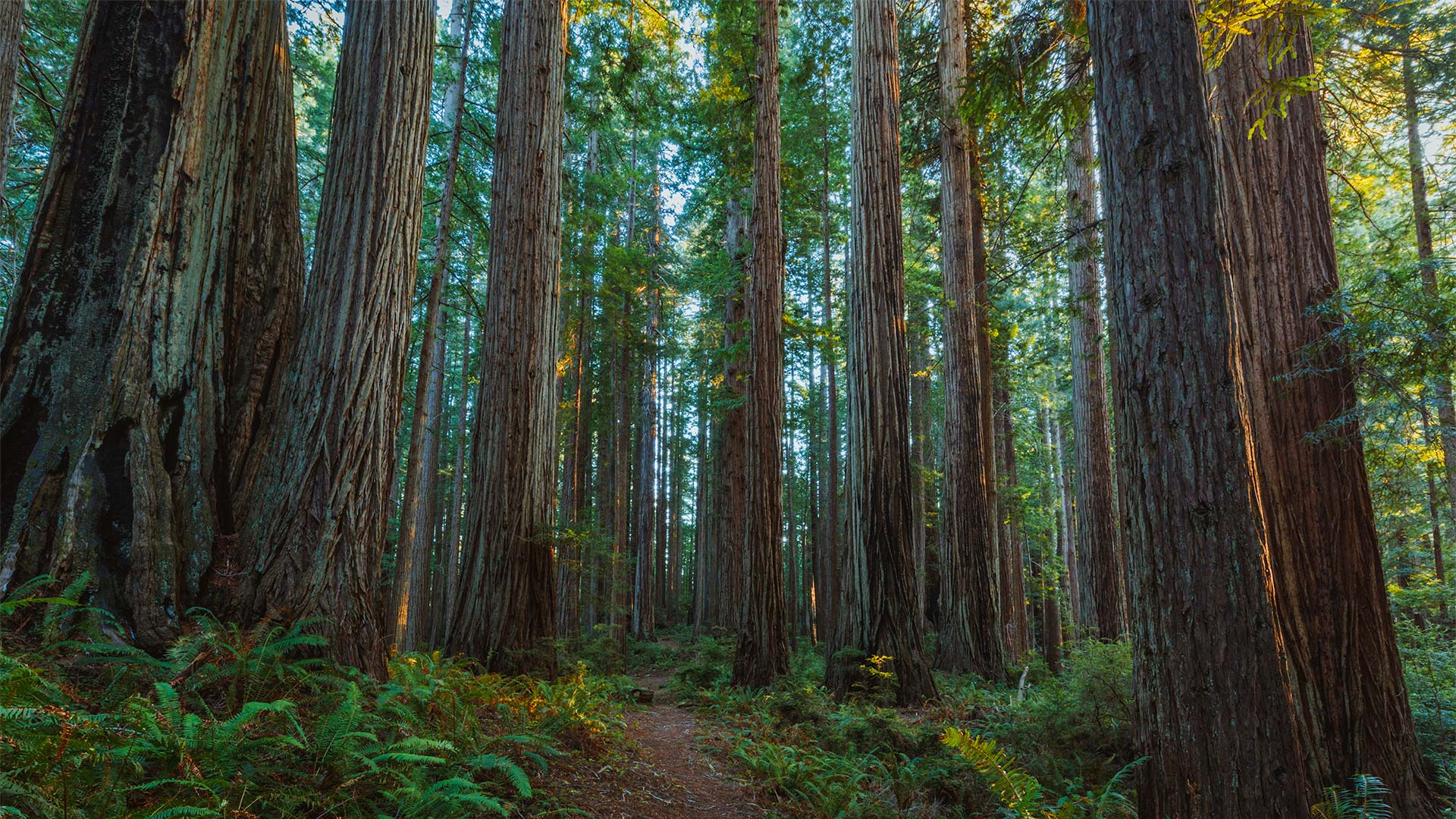
Prairie Creek Redwoods State Park

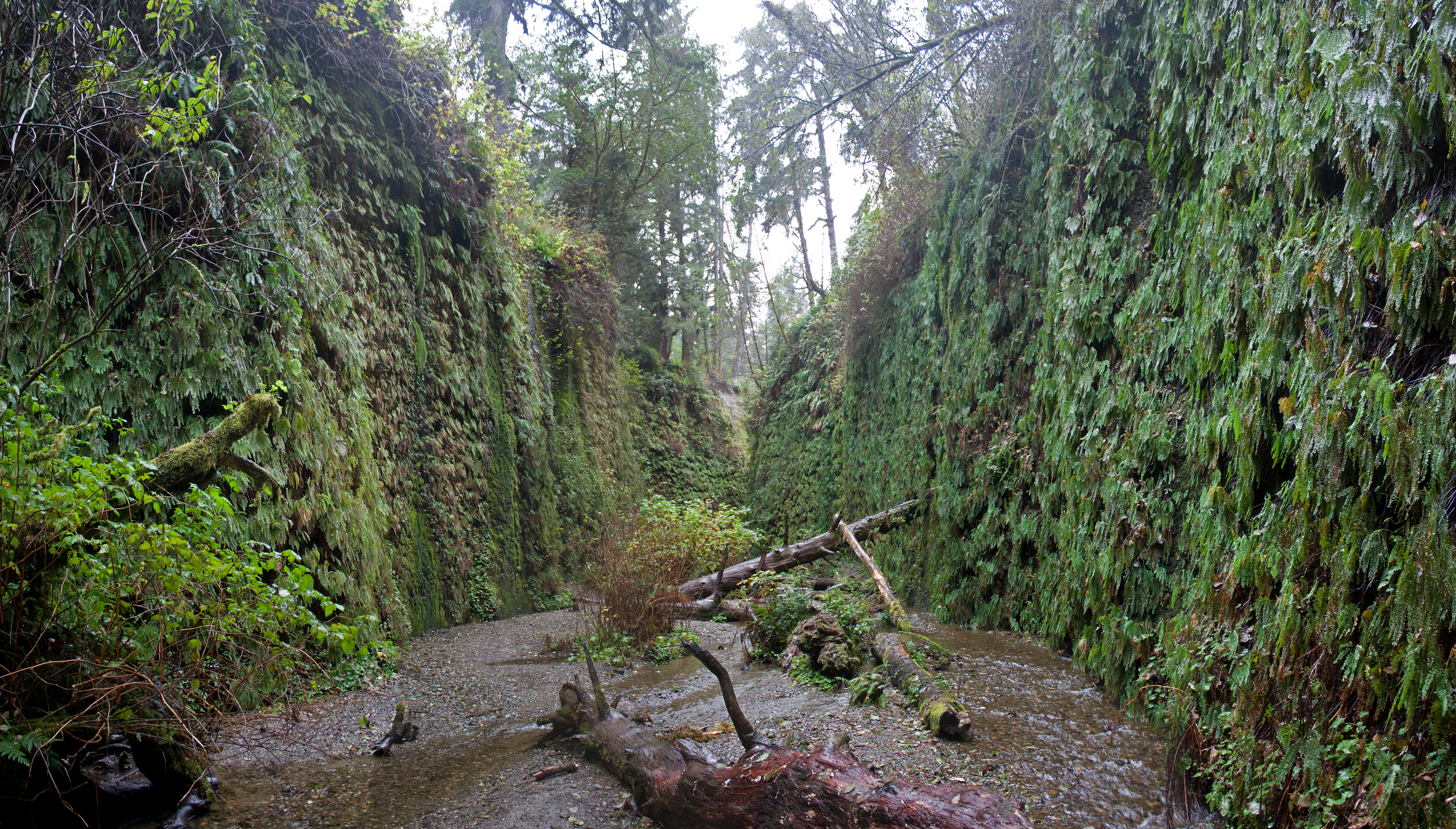
Fern Canyon

Although the first film was partially shot in Kauai, Hawaii, the filmmakers wanted to shoot the sequel in a different location with new scenery. Production designer Rick Carter had initially scouted Hawaii, then Puerto Rico, New Zealand, and Australia, as possible filming locations. Although the film is set near Costa Rica, the country was never considered because filming would have occurred during the rainy season. However, the film did use tropical sound effects recorded there.

By February 1996, northern New Zealand had been chosen as a filming location. The country was believed to better represent a real dinosaur environment, and was to be used for the film's opening beach sequence, the dinosaur roundup led by the InGen hunters, and establishing shots. New Zealand was eventually deemed too costly; filming there was drastically scaled back in August 1996, in favor of Humboldt County, California, which offered financial incentives that would keep production costs low. Oregon had also been considered as an alternative to New Zealand.

Filming began on September 4, 1996, at Fern Canyon, part of Prairie Creek Redwoods State Park. Dieter's death was among the scenes shot there. Production continued in Humboldt County for two weeks at locations such as Patrick's Point State Park, and private property in Fieldbrook, both used for the dinosaur roundup. Other filming sites included the redwood forests of Eureka. This location was picked because research indicated dinosaurs did not live in tropical habitats, but forests like the ones in Eureka.

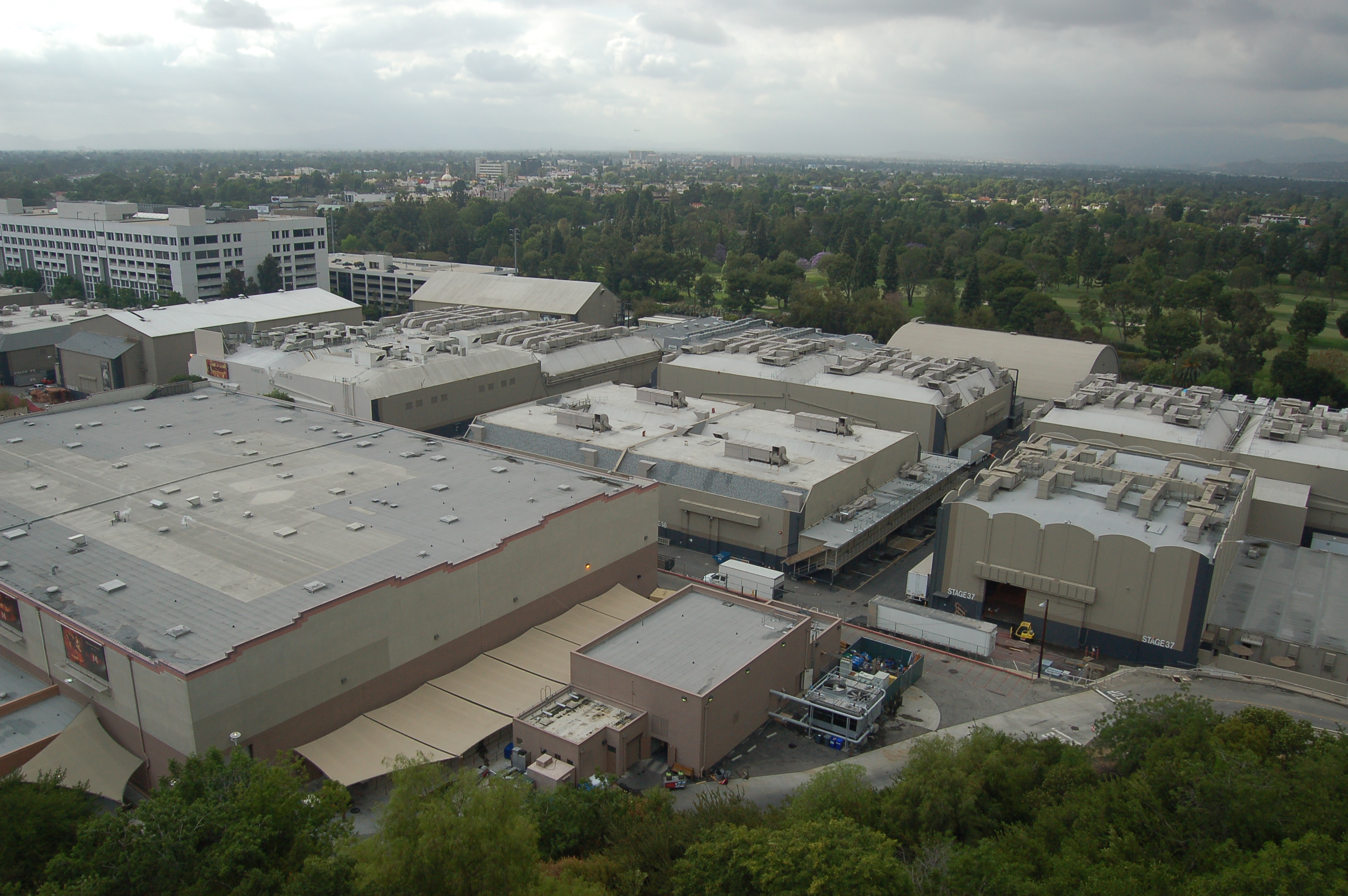
Sound stages at Universal Studios were among the filming locations

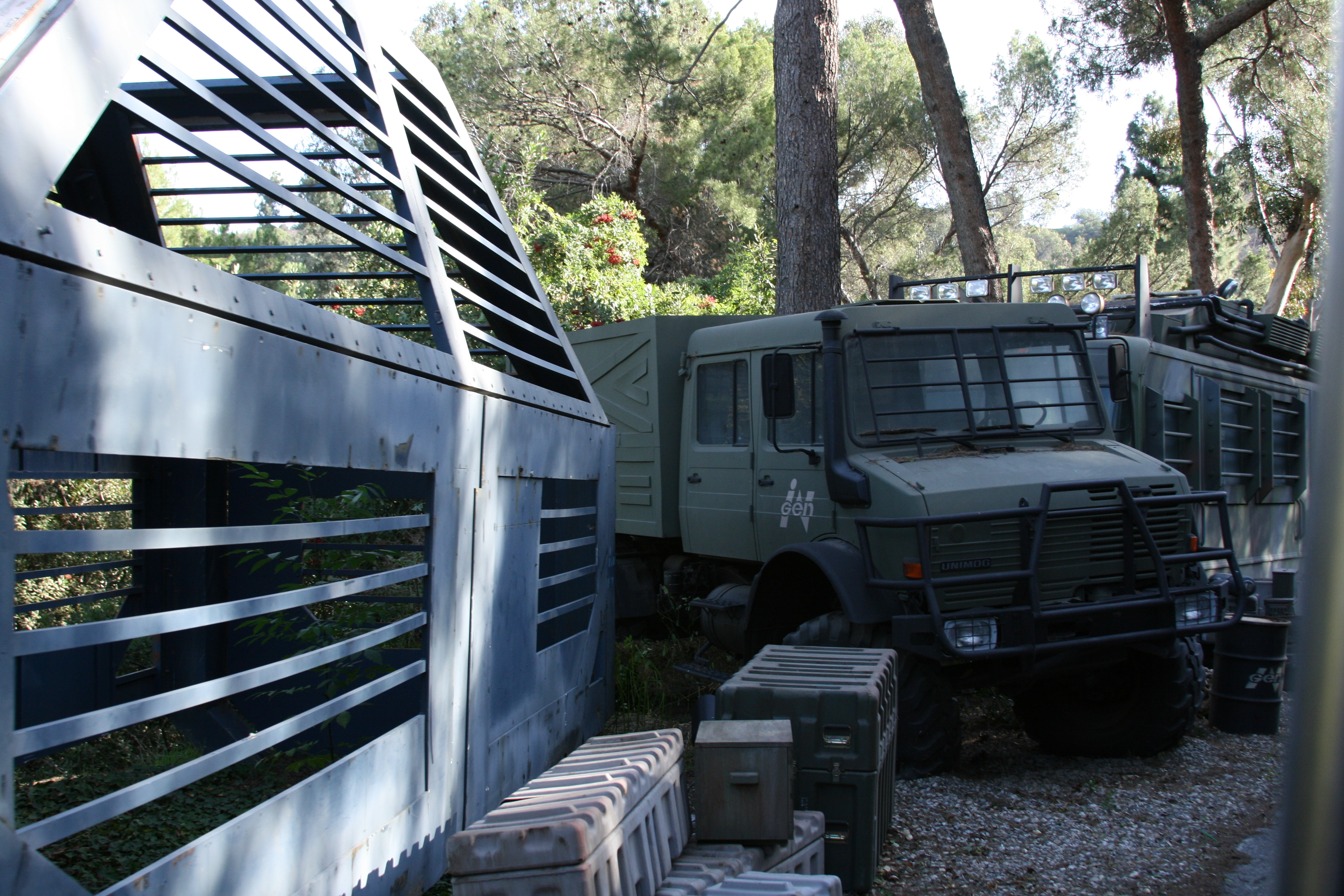
Dinosaur cage and InGen Unimog used during filming, seen here as part of the Studio Tour

After work concluded in Humboldt County, filming moved to sound stages at the Universal Studios Lot, located in the Los Angeles area. The studio complex had previously been used as a location for the first film. Because of limited stage space in Hollywood, the production crew had to alternate between the different Universal stages, which were redecorated when not in use to prepare for future filming. The InGen village was also constructed at Universal Studios, behind the Psycho house, and was left intact after filming to become part of the Studio Tour attraction.

At one point during the Universal shoot, Spielberg was unavailable for filming because of a family commitment in New York. Koepp took over the first unit for eight days, and Spielberg monitored the filming process through satellite video during this time. Some of the high hide scenes had been filmed on location at Prairie Creek, while a dialogue-heavy portion was shot against a blue screen at Universal, the latter scene monitored by Spielberg during his week off.

The film features more than 20 customized vehicles, including those used by the InGen hunters. The group's base camp was largely filmed on Stage 12. An exception is when the captured dinosaurs are released and wreak havoc on the camp; this was shot at the Los Angeles County Arboretum. A large ravine was constructed on Stage 23 for the scene in which a T. rex chases characters into a small cave hidden behind a waterfall. Special-effects expert Michael Lantieri constructed the artificial waterfall, and the scene was filmed using a Steadicam. Spielberg estimated that nearly half of the film was shot with Steadicam, as it was useful for the abundance of chase scenes.

Koepp had read through hunting literature and learned of jaguars in South Africa who stalk their prey through long grass. This inspired the scene in which raptors attack the InGen team in a field of long grass. It was filmed in early November 1996. Lantieri and a team started growing real grass months in advance, on eight acres located in Newhall, California. The size of the property allowed for potential reshoots, as any grass that was flattened during filming would not come back up.

Among the final scenes to be shot were those set at Hammond's residence; these were filmed on December 6, 1996, at Mayfield Senior School in Pasadena, California. A scene where Vaughn's character emerges from a lake was also filmed in Pasadena.

The final filming location was Kauai, where the opening beach scene was shot. Originally, this was to be filmed at New Zealand's Fiordland National Park, over a five-day period in December 1996. However, plans to shoot there were abruptly canceled early in the month, as a time- and cost-saving measure. A location closer to the United States was favored, with Kauai's Kipu Kai beach ultimately chosen. Filming took place there later in the month.

Another scene in Kauai was handled by Koepp and the second unit. The scene, in which Malcolm's group approaches Isla Sorna, had to be improvised when the boat became stuck on a sandbar. Koepp contacted Spielberg on how to proceed, and was told to rewrite and shoot the scene the best he could. In the finished film, the boat's captain stops because he fears coming any closer to the island, having heard stories about fishermen who never returned. Principal photography wrapped on December 20, 1996.

==== Trailer scenes ====
The research trailer used by Malcolm's team is a modified 1997 Fleetwood Southwind Storm RV, several of which were made for the filming of various scenes. One scene depicts the group after their arrival on Isla Sorna; this was filmed at Patrick's Point, in a visitor parking lot that was covered in dirt and vegetation for the shoot.

The trailer attack sequence was filmed at Universal Studios over the course of nearly a month, wrapping in October 1996. For shots in which half of the trailer dangles from a cliff, a whole mountainside was built over a Universal parking garage, with the trailer dangled against it using a 95-ton crane. Some of the dangling trailer shots were also filmed on Stage 27, where a hole in the roof had to be made to accommodate the crane. Before being shoved off the cliff, the T. rex adults attack the trailer by slamming their heads into it. This scene used animatronic dinosaurs, which caused authentic damage to the trailer rather than through the use of computer effects. Shots involving the animatronic T. rexes and the trailer together were filmed on Stage 24. An 80-foot (24 m) track was built into the stage floor, allowing the T. rexes to be moved backward and forward.

A portion of the sequence was filmed in a continuous take using a 26-foot (7.9 m) crane arm. The camera would track actor Richard Schiff as his character Eddie travels through part of the trailer to throw rope down to the other characters, who are stuck in the rear half of the trailer as it dangles over the side of the cliff. This shot required precise timing to get right, and a dolly track also had to be built into the stage. While filming inside the trailer, the camera would lose focus because of interference from some piece of the electronic equipment in the vehicle. After 15 failed takes, the film crew was close to giving up on the shot, until a remote-focus mechanism was mounted onto the camera. Another issue resulted from the scene taking place during a storm, as the artificial rain fogged the camera lens, and the camera's rain deflectors failed. Ultimately, the crew managed to get three good takes during the nine-hour shoot.

In another portion of the sequence, the characters played by Moore, Goldblum and Vaughn must climb the rope in an attempt to escape the dangling trailer. Moore considered this to be the most difficult scene of the film: "We were hanging upside down in harnesses, and they had the rain going onstage, soaking us. It was freezing onstage too." Temperatures had to be kept low to prevent condensation on the camera lens.

Animatronics were primarily used for the scene in which the T. rexes return and kill Eddie. The exception to this were two computer-generated shots: when the animals emerge from the forest, and when they tear Eddie's body in half. Otherwise, animatronics were used for shots in which the animals tear the vehicle apart to get to Eddie. Filming the scene with animatronics required close collaboration with a stunt coordinator.

==== San Diego sequence ====
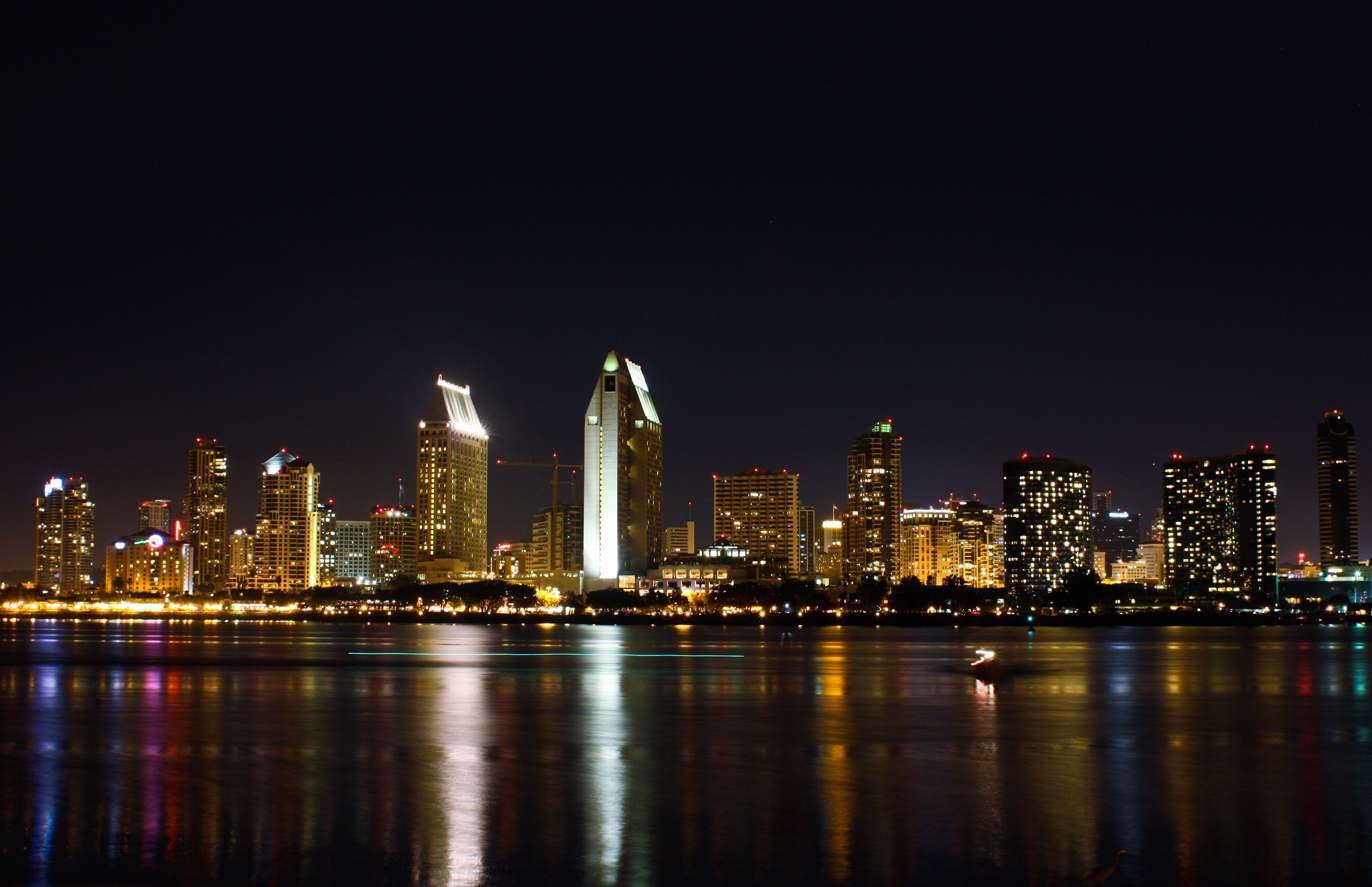
Downtown San Diego's nighttime skyline, seen here in 2011, accounts for the only footage shot in the city

Although the T. rex rampage is set in San Diego, the filmmakers eventually decided against shooting there, deeming the city too far from Los Angeles and seeking a closer location for convenience. This decision came just 16 days before the sequence was scheduled to begin shooting. The crew soon settled on Burbank, California for portions of the rampage. Nighttime shots of downtown San Diego's skyline make up the only footage filmed in the city, including a brief shot of an InGen helicopter flying over the wharf and banking toward high-rises. San Diego's Gaslamp Quarter had been scouted as a possible location prior to Burbank being selected.

The San Diego sequence was filmed in November 1996, near the Media City Center mall. The crew took over five city blocks for the shoot, with one block on each end accommodating trailers and equipment. Barricades were installed to maintain secrecy among curious bystanders; Spielberg noted that "it looked like road-repair work was going on". One scene has the T. rex ramming into a driving bus which then crashes into a Blockbuster Video, built as a set. The bus ramming required the use of pneumatics, cables, breakaway glass, and charges.

Another Burbank scene features dozens of people fleeing the T. rex, and includes a Godzilla reference added by Spielberg and Koepp: a Japanese businessman, screaming in his native language, that he "left Tokyo to get away from this!" Members of the crew are featured among those fleeing the T. rex, and Koepp also wrote a cameo scene for himself as one of these individuals. He is credited as "Unlucky Bastard" and is eaten by the dinosaur. According to Koepp, "When I was writing this scene, I decided that if people were going to get eaten by the T-rex, I wanted to be one of them. I asked Steven if I could do it, and he said: "Kill you on film? No problem!'" The T. rex, in this instance, was added in later through computer-generated imagery (CGI), and Koepp found it more difficult than expected to act with a non-existent dinosaur.

Other portions of the rampage were shot in the Los Angeles neighborhood of Granada Hills, where locations included a Union 76 gas station and the exterior of a family's house. Stage 24 was utilized as home interiors, for a scene in which the family realizes the T. rex is in their backyard.

Most of the San Diego dock scenes were filmed at San Pedro Bay over six days. Exterior sets were built there depicting the dock before and after the impact of the ship carrying the T. rex. Industrial Light & Magic (ILM), which worked on the CGI dinosaurs, also created an eighth-scale dock and miniature ship. These were used for the impact scene itself, which was filmed by ILM in March 1997. In addition, ILM created a miniature model depicting the amphitheater stadium for Jurassic Park San Diego.

=== Creatures on screen ===
While Jurassic Park featured mostly the animatronic dinosaurs built by Stan Winston's team, The Lost World relied more on the computer-generated imagery (CGI) of Industrial Light & Magic (ILM). This meant the film featured larger shots that offered plenty of space for the digital artists to add the dinosaurs. Film editing began on the first day of principal photography, and both processes continued simultaneously. This allowed ILM to get an early start on the CGI animals. The film features 75 computer-generated shots. A scene in which the hunters round up a group of dinosaurs was made almost entirely with computer-generated creatures. An exception was a handful of Pachycephalosaurus shots.

Spielberg followed Horner's advice to help keep the dinosaurs scientifically accurate, with some exceptions. The Winston design team closely modelled the dinosaurs based on paleontological facts, or theories in certain cases where facts were not definitively known. In addition to animatronics, Winston's team also painted maquettes of dinosaurs that would subsequently be created through CGI. ILM animators went to Marine World/Africa USA to videotape elephants, reptiles, and rhinos, to determine how to make the dinosaurs appear more like living animals. Although technology had not progressed much since the release of the first film, Spielberg noted that "the artistry of the creative computer people" had advanced: "There's better detail, much better lighting, better muscle tone and movement in the animals. When a dinosaur transfers weight from his left side to his right, the whole movement of fat and sinew is smoother, more physiologically correct". All of the dinosaurs used servo control for facial movements.

While the first film showed that dinosaurs could be adequately recreated through special effects, the sequel raised the question of what could be done with the dinosaurs. Winston said: "I wanted to show the world what they didn't see in Jurassic Park: more dinosaurs and more dinosaur action. 'More, bigger, better' was our motto". Some of the animatronics cost $1 million and weighed nine and a half tons. Lantieri, the special effects supervisor, said: "The big T. rex robot can pull two Gs of force when it's moving from right to left. If you hit someone with that, you'd kill them. So, in a sense, we did treat the dinosaurs as living, dangerous creatures".

Winston's team had only a year to design and build the animatronic dinosaurs, one year less than with the original film. The animatronics in both films used foam latex, which deteriorates quickly. Animatronics of the T. rex and raptors were reused from the first film, with new skin made from molds that had been kept from the previous installment.

- Compsognathus, nicknamed "Compies", are a small carnivorous theropod which attacks in packs. Visual effects supervisor Dennis Muren considered them the most complex digital dinosaur. Their small size meant the Compys had their whole body visible and thus needed a higher sense of gravity and weight. A simple puppet Compsognathus is featured in the opening scene, and the part where Dieter is killed by the pack involved Stormare wearing a jacket onto which various rubber Compies were attached. In the film, Burke identifies the dinosaur as Compsognathus triassicus, which in reality is a non-existent species. The name is a combination of Compsognathus longipes and Procompsognathus triassicus.
- Gallimimus is shown fleeing from the InGen hunters.
- Mamenchisaurus is shown on the game trail scene. The Brachiosaurus model from the first film was altered to portray the Mamenchisaurus, which was fully computer-generated.
- Pachycephalosaurus, a dinosaur standing five feet tall and measuring eight feet long. Three versions of the creature were created for filming: a full hydraulic puppet, a head, and a head-butter. The latter was built to withstand high impact for a scene in which the dinosaur head-butts one of the hunter vehicles. The Pachycephalosaurus puppet, one of the most complex, was used for a scene in which the dinosaur is captured. The legs of the puppet were controlled through pneumatics.
- Parasaurolophus is shown being hunted down by the InGen hunters. Winston's team was to create a puppet version of the animal for this scene, but ILM ultimately created the animal through CGI instead, basing the design off of a miniature sculpture that Winston's team had created. In addition, an earlier opening scene that was scrapped would have featured a Japanese fishing trawler acquiring a partially decomposed Parasaurolophus in its net, which would break from the weight, allowing the body to sink back into the ocean. Winston's team created a practical Parasaurolophus for the scene before it was scrapped, although the carcass was still used for a scene set in a T. rex nest.
- Pteranodon makes an appearance at the film's end.
- Stegosaurus was, according to Spielberg, included "by popular demand". Winston's team built full-sized versions of both the infant and adult Stegosaurus, but Spielberg eventually opted to employ a digital version for the adults so they could be more mobile. The baby Stegosaurus was 8 feet (2.4 m) long and weighed 400 pounds (180 kg). It was shipped to the redwood forest for on-site filming. The adult stegosaurs were 26 feet (7.9 m) long and 16 feet (4.9 m) tall. Although they were also brought to the forest for filming, they ultimately were not used because of mobility issues and safety concerns. A full-sized Stegosaurus is only shown in a brief shot, in which the animal is caged.
- Triceratops is shown being hunted down by the InGen hunters. A baby Triceratops was also created by Winston's team, for a shot depicting the animal in a cage. A baby Triceratops had previously been planned for the first film, before being scrapped.
- Tyrannosaurus is featured as a family, with two adults and an infant. In addition to the T. rex animatronic from the first film, Winston and his team also built a second adult T. rex for the sequel. Featuring two practical T. rexes required double the work and puppeteers. The adult T. rex animatronics were built from head to mid-body, while full body shots were created through CGI. The animatronics weighed nine tons each and cost $1 million apiece. Because the animatronics were heavy and difficult to move, the decision was made to install them on Stage 24 for the duration of the shoot, building new sets around them as filming progressed. In addition to Eddie's death, an animatronic T. rex was also used in scenes depicting the deaths of Burke and Ludlow.
  - The baby T. rex had two different practical versions, a "fully contained" remote controlled version the actors could carry, and a hybrid operated by both hydraulics and cables which lay on the operating table, and had the added complexity of moving as Vaughn held its head.
- Velociraptor had a mechanical version which depicted the upper half of its body, and a digital full-motion computer raptor. A "super-raptor" had also been considered for the film, but Spielberg rejected it, saying it was "a little too much out of a horror movie. I didn't want to create an alien".

== Soundtrack ==
For the sequel, composer John Williams avoided using most of the previous film's main themes, writing a more action-oriented score. The soundtrack was released on May 20, 1997. It, along with the soundtrack to the first film, was remastered and re-released on November 29, 2016.

== Marketing ==
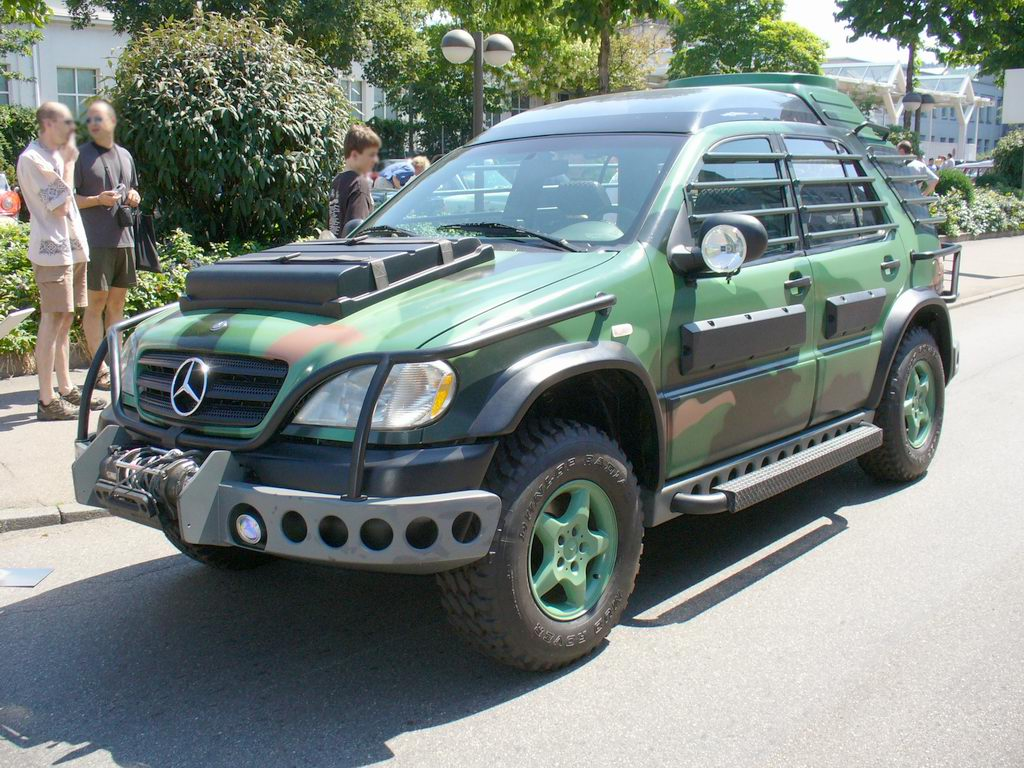
The Mercedes-Benz ML 320 (W163) used in the film, on display at the Mercedes-Benz Museum in Germany.

In February 1997, Universal announced a $250 million marketing campaign with 70 promotional partners. It was even more extensive than that of Jurassic Park. Inspired by how Jurassic Park featured the Ford Explorer, Mercedes-Benz signed an endorsement deal for the sequel to introduce its first sports utility vehicle, the ML 320 (W163). Other leading partners were Burger King, which was already promoting Universal's other dinosaur franchise, The Land Before Time; JVC, which also has product placement in the movie; and Timberland Co., making its first film tie-in. Another partner was Tropicana Products, a then-sister company of Universal under Seagram. Other promotional partners included Hamburger Helper and Betty Crocker, while General Mills introduced Jurassic Park Crunch cereal. Derivative works included various video games, a pinball machine, and a four-part comic series released by Topps Comics.

Both covers for the first issue of Topps Comics adaptation.

Other promotional items included a toy line of action figures by Kenner and remote-controlled vehicles by Tyco, as well as a board game by Milton Bradley Company. Also produced were Hershey's chocolate bars that featured holographic dinosaur patterns. Universal hoped for promotional profits to exceed $1 billion.

On December 13, 1996, a special version of the film's teaser trailer debuted at 42 theaters in the United States and Canada, at a cost of $14,000 for each theater; the trailer used synchronized strobe lights that mimicked lightning during a rain scene. The film's first trailer was aired on January 26, 1997, during Super Bowl XXXI. A travelling exhibition, The Lost World: The Life and Death of Dinosaurs, went on tour in May 1997, coinciding with the film's release. The exhibit was produced in connection with the film, and its centerpiece was a 70-foot-long recreation of a Mamenchisaurus.

A detailed website for the film was also created, and provided backstory for characters and events not referenced in the film. Shortly after the film's release, hackers broke into the website and briefly changed the film's logo to feature a duck instead of a T. rex. The film's title in the logo was also temporarily changed to The Duck World: Jurassic Pond. Universal denied that the hacking was a publicity stunt to promote the film, stating that it was traced to a "16-year-old hacker kid from back East". The website was still online as of 2017.

== Release ==
=== Theatrical ===
The Lost World: Jurassic Park premiered on May 19, 1997, at the Cineplex Odeon theater in Universal City, California. The Los Angeles Times called the premiere "low-key". The film opened on May 23, 1997, with previews commencing at 10 p.m. the night before. It received the widest release for a film to date, opening in 3,281 theaters, surpassing the record held by the 1996 film Mission: Impossible. The film expanded to 3,565 theaters in its fourth weekend. It was the first film to use the 1997-2012 Universal Pictures logo, accompanied by its fanfare by Jerry Goldsmith. It was the first US film to be widely distributed in India, being released in 155 cinemas on September 5, 1997.

== Home media ==
The Lost World: Jurassic Park made its home video debut on THX-certified VHS and LaserDisc releases on November 4, 1997, accompanied by a $50 million promotional campaign.

Fox paid $80 million for the broadcasting rights of The Lost World: Jurassic Park, which debuted on November 1, 1998. The television version was expanded with deleted scenes, including Hammond's ouster by InGen executives.

The Lost World: Jurassic Park was released on a Collector's Edition DVD on October 10, 2000, in both Widescreen (1.85:1) and Full Screen (1.33:1) versions, in a box set with its predecessor Jurassic Park. The films were also featured in a deluxe limited edition box set featuring both DVDs, soundtrack albums, two lenticulars, stills from both films, and a certificate of authenticity signed by the set's producers, inside a collector case. After the release of sequel Jurassic Park III, box sets including all three movies were also made available, as Jurassic Park Trilogy on December 11, 2001, and as the Jurassic Park Adventure Pack on November 29, 2005. The Lost World was first made available on Blu-ray on October 25, 2011, as part of a trilogy release. The entire Jurassic Park film series was released on 4K UHD Blu-Ray on May 22, 2018.

== Reception ==
=== Box office ===
The Lost World took in $72.1 million on its opening weekend ($92.7 million for the four-day Memorial Day holiday, including $2.6 million from Thursday night previews) in the U.S., which was the biggest opening weekend up to that point, beating Batman Forever. This made it the first film to reach the $70 million mark during an opening weekend. For four and a half years, the film held that record until the release of Harry Potter and the Sorcerer's Stone in November 2001.

The film also had the biggest May and Memorial Day opening weekends respectively, surpassing the previous records held by Mission: Impossible. It would hold the May opening weekend record until 2002 when Spider-Man replaced it. As for the Memorial Day weekend record, it would be beaten by Shrek 2 in 2004, although the opening weekend record was given to X-Men: The Last Stand two years later in 2006. Furthermore, the film had the highest opening weekend for a Spielberg film, and retained this record for a decade before being dethroned by Indiana Jones and the Kingdom of the Crystal Skull in 2008. A year later, Fast & Furious surpassed The Lost World to have the largest opening weekend for any Universal film.

The Lost World broke several other box office records as well. The film made $21.6 million on its Friday opening and $24.4 million on its second day, making it the highest Friday and Saturday grosses respectively. While the Friday record was taken by Toy Story 2 in 1999, the film continued to hold the Saturday record for two more years until The Mummy Returns surpassed it. It also took the record for highest single-day box office take of $26.1 million on May 25, a record held until the release of Star Wars: Episode I – The Phantom Menace in 1999. During its opening weekend, the film reached the number one spot at the box office, topping The Fifth Element and Addicted to Love. It became the fastest film to pass the $100 million mark, achieving the feat in just six days and beating out Independence Day. This was also Spielberg's fastest film to cross this mark, holding that record until War of the Worlds overtook it in 2005, taking five days to do so.

Despite these records, its total box office gross fell below the total of the original film. Ticket sales dropped 62% by its second weekend. The film made $34.1 million during its second weekend, making it the fourth-highest-grossing second weekend of all time, after its predecessor Jurassic Park, Twister and Independence Day. Over the next few weeks, The Lost World went on to compete against other blockbuster films released during that summer such as Hercules, Face/Off, Men in Black, Con Air, George of the Jungle, Batman & Robin and Speed 2: Cruise Control. In Thailand, The Lost World became the country's highest-grossing film of all time. It ultimately grossed $229.1 million in the U.S. and $389.5 million internationally, for a total of $618.6 million worldwide, becoming the second highest-grossing film of 1997 behind Titanic. The film sold an estimated 49,910,000 tickets in North America.

=== Critical response ===
The Lost World: Jurassic Park was released to mixed reviews. On review aggregation website Rotten Tomatoes, the film holds an approval rating of 57% based on 152 reviews and an average rating of 5.70/10. The site's critical consensus reads: "The Lost World demonstrates how far CG effects have come in the four years since Jurassic Park; unfortunately, it also proves how difficult it can be to put together a truly compelling sequel." On Metacritic, the film has a weighted average rating of 59 out of 100, based on 18 critics, indicating "mixed or average reviews". Audiences polled by CinemaScore gave the film an average grade of "B+" on an A+ to F scale.

Roger Ebert, who gave the first film three stars, gave The Lost World only two, writing: "It can be said that the creatures in this film transcend any visible signs of special effects and seem to walk the earth, but the same realism isn't brought to the human characters, who are bound by plot conventions and action formulas". Gene Siskel of the Chicago Tribune also gave the film two stars and said: "I was disappointed as much as I was thrilled because 'The Lost World' lacks a staple of Steven Spielberg's adventure films: exciting characters. [...] Even in the original 'Jurassic Park', the dinosaurs – not to mention the human beings – had more distinct personalities than they have here. Save for superior special effects, 'The Lost World' comes off as recycled material".

Kevin Thomas of the Los Angeles Times saw improved character development over the original: "It seemed such a mistake in Jurassic Park to sideline early on its most interesting character, the brilliant, free-thinking and outspoken theorist Ian Malcolm (Jeff Goldblum) with a broken leg, but in its most inspired stroke, The Lost World brings back Malcolm and places him front and center", calling it "a pleasure to watch such wily pros as Goldblum and Attenborough spar with each other with wit and assurance". Stephen Holden of The New York Times wrote, "The Lost World, unlike Jurassic Park, humanizes its monsters in a way that E.T. would understand". Owen Gleiberman of Entertainment Weekly gave the film a B grade; he remarked, "Mr. T-Rex was cool in the first Spielberg flick, sure, but it wasn't until [it was in] San Diego that things got crazy-cool. It's the old 'tree falling in the woods' conundrum: Unless your giant monster is causing massive property damage, can you really call it a giant monster?"

Spielberg said that during production he became increasingly disenchanted with the film:

I beat myself up... growing more and more impatient with myself... It made me wistful about doing a talking picture, because sometimes I got the feeling I was just making this big silent-roar movie... I found myself saying, 'Is that all there is? It's not enough for me'.

Spielberg regretted that the film characters are aware they are going to an island of dinosaurs, unlike the previous film. In 2016, he said:

My sequels aren't as good as my originals because I go onto every sequel I've made and I'm too confident. This movie made a ka-zillion dollars, which justifies the sequel, so I come in like it's going to be a slam dunk and I wind up making an inferior movie to the one before. I'm talking about The Lost World and Jurassic Park.

Spielberg would again reaffirm his displeasure with the film in 2021:

Fear is my fuel and confidence is my enemy. If I'm on my heels, I get better ideas than, let's say, coming in to do the sequel to Jurassic Park. It's a lot better for me not to make the sequel to Jurassic Park.

However, Spielberg has praised the work of composer John Williams on the film, declaring Williams' score for The Lost World: Jurassic Park as superior to the score of the first film due to it being "musically more complicated" than its predecessor.

In an interview with Variety during the promotion of Jurassic World Dominion, which coincided with the film's 25th anniversary, Jeff Goldblum said, "I love that movie. Julianne Moore is fantastic in it, and I like how I go there to rescue her." He also praised Vanessa Lee Chester, who played his daughter in the film, calling her "fantastic", and complimented his co-stars Pete Postlethwaite and Vince Vaughn.

==== Retrospective ====
Later reviews have also been mixed. Critic Tim Brayton, in 2013, described it as "readily the worst thing Steven Spielberg has ever made." In 2015, Matt Goldberg of Collider wrote that the film feels "like the work of a Spielberg protégé. All the beats are in place, but it's an imitation". He considered the film inferior to its predecessor. In 2018, Brian Silliman of Syfy Wire cited the film as a rare example of a film adaptation that is better than its novel counterpart. In particular, he praised the addition of Postlethwaite and his character. However, Syfy Wire's Stephanie Williams considered the novel superior, finding it more action-packed and thrilling while also taking its time "to breathe with these majestic creatures", whereas the film has "way more running and screaming". Bilge Ebiri of Vulture reviewed the film in 2020, praising the horror elements and writing that it "might be Spielberg's nastiest film – a truly demented series of mostly wordless action and horror set pieces whose technical proficiency is matched only by their cruelty". In contrast, Jacob Hall of /Film negatively compared it to Spielberg's 1984 film Indiana Jones and the Temple of Doom, writing that The Lost World transforms "intelligent characters into bumbling idiots", increases "the volume and the chaos while dialing back the mystery and the awe", and replaces "excitement with violence and cruelty". In 2024, Rolling Stone ranked it 48th on its list of 50 Most Disappointing Movie Sequels of All Time, writing, "It all feels very humdrum and lacks any sense of wonder found in the original." In 2025, Far Out Magazine and USA Today ranked The Lost World: Jurassic Park as Spielberg's worst film as a director.. In June 2026, Darren Frannich of The Hollywood Reporter ranked The Lost World: Jurassic Park at the bottom of his Spielberg film ranking list.

Conversely, the film has also received praise for its darker tone, action sequences, and Spielberg's direction. In his 2023 review for Inverse, Ryan Britt said "Now that it's been 26 years since The Lost World hit theaters and four more films have failed to recapture the magic of the original, this strange sequel feels surprisingly elevated." Joseph Tomastik of Loud and Clear Reviews awarded The Lost World four out of five stars, saying, "Is it as good or groundbreaking as Jurassic Park? Definitely not. Are its characters remarkable overall? No. But this is still an expertly-crafted, exciting film that's packed with amazing sequences that take this series to a different, less glamorous, and more frantic place while still staying true to the core of what made it enticing to begin with."

Writing for ComicBook.com, Brad Curran praised the film's dark tone. He summarized his review saying "With The Lost World, Spielberg made an effort to color outside of the lines a little, with a markedly darker tone that inched right up to the R-rated line, all while keeping the series' adventurous spirit intact and greatly expanding upon the scope, quantity, and actual characterization of the dinosaurs themselves." Colin McCormick of Screen Rant also praised Spielberg's direction, the set pieces, and the performance of the cast. Frazier Tharpe of GQ said in his review "Spielberg delivered high art with Jurassic Park, and in recognizing that it would be futile to re-attempt the magic trick, settled for gourmet popcorn with its sequel. The Lost World, on its own merits, is one of the great summer blockbusters."

== Accolades ==
| Award | Date of ceremony | Category | Recipient(s) | Result | Ref(s) |
|---|---|---|---|---|---|
| Academy Awards | March 23, 1998 | Best Visual Effects | Dennis Muren, Stan Winston, Randal M. Dutra and Michael Lantieri | Nominated | |
| Blockbuster Entertainment Awards | March 10, 1998 | Favorite Actor – Sci-Fi | Jeff Goldblum | Nominated | |
| Blockbuster Entertainment Awards | March 10, 1998 | Favorite Actress – Sci-Fi | Julianne Moore | Nominated | |
| Golden Raspberry Awards | March 22, 1998 | Worst Remake or Sequel | | Nominated | |
| Golden Raspberry Awards | March 22, 1998 | Worst Reckless Disregard for Human Life and Public Property | | Nominated | |
| Golden Raspberry Awards | March 22, 1998 | Worst Screenplay | David Koepp, based on the book by Michael Crichton | Nominated | |
| Grammy Awards | February 25, 1998 | Best Instrumental Composition | John Williams | Nominated | |
| Image Awards | February 13–14, 1998 | Outstanding Youth Actor/Actress | Vanessa Lee Chester | Nominated | |
| MTV Movie Awards | May 30, 1998 | Best Action Sequence | T-Rex attacks San Diego | Nominated | |
| Rembrandt Awards | 1998 | Best Director | Steven Spielberg | Won | |
| Satellite Awards | February 22, 1998 | Best Motion Picture – Animated or Mixed Media | | Nominated | |
| Saturn Awards | June 10, 1998 | Best Fantasy Film | | Nominated | |
| Saturn Awards | June 10, 1998 | Best Director | Steven Spielberg | Nominated | |
| Saturn Awards | June 10, 1998 | Best Supporting Actor | Pete Postlethwaite | Nominated | |
| Saturn Awards | June 10, 1998 | Best Performance by a Younger Actor | Vanessa Lee Chester | Nominated | |
| Saturn Awards | June 10, 1998 | Best Special Effects | Dennis Muren, Stan Winston, Randal M. Dutra and Michael Lantieri | Nominated | |
| Stinkers Bad Movie Awards | 1998 | Worst Screenplay for a Film Grossing More Than $100 Million Worldwide Using Hollywood Math | | Nominated | |
| Stinkers Bad Movie Awards | 1998 | Worst Sequel | | Nominated | |

== Sequel ==
A third film, Jurassic Park III, was released in 2001. It was directed by Joe Johnston, with Spielberg as executive producer.

== See also ==
- List of films featuring dinosaurs
- Michael Crichton's The Lost World novel and adaptations
