= Lindsay Creek Tree =

Former notably large coast redwood in California

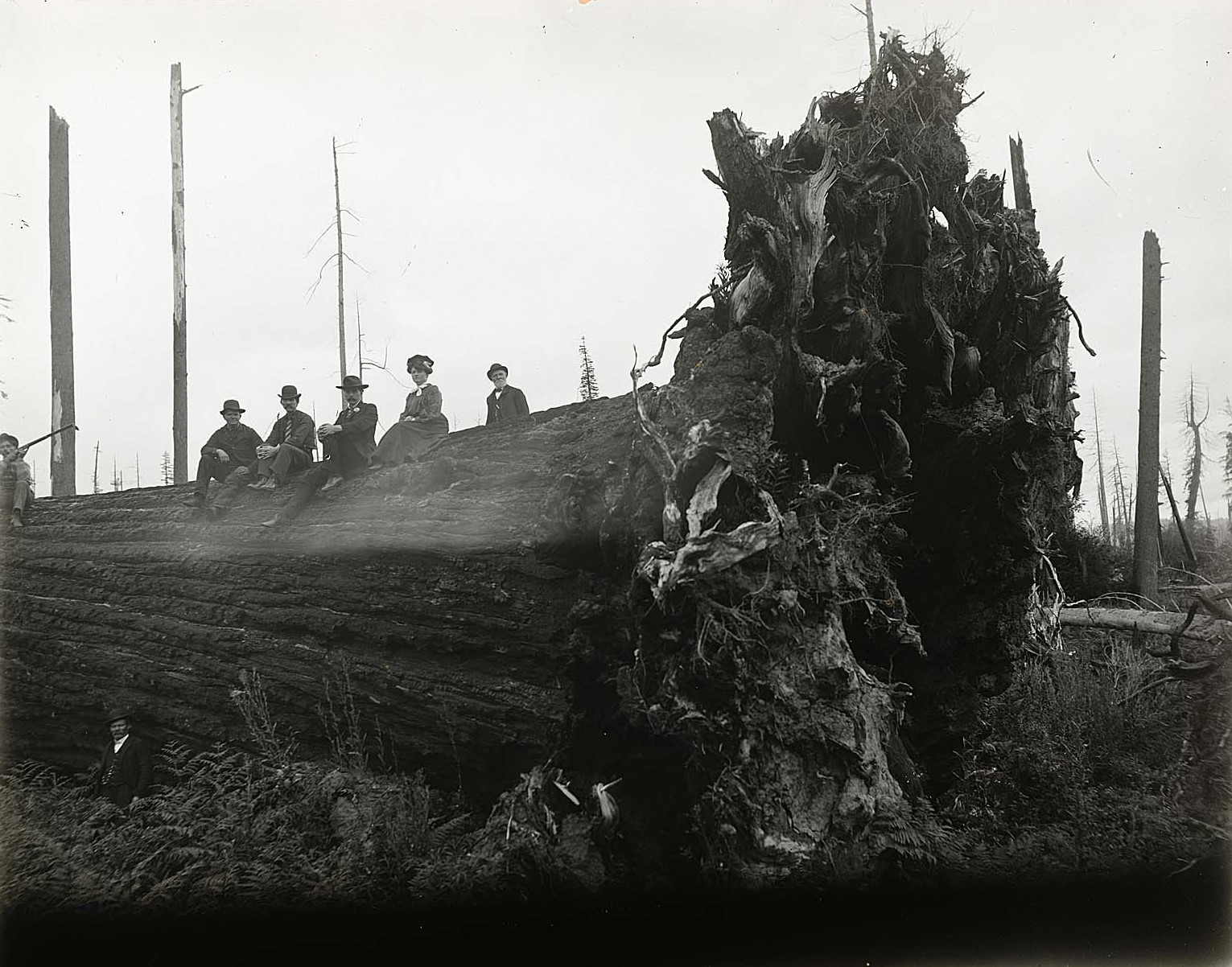
- One of five known photographs believed to be of the Lindsay Creek Tree, taken by A.W. Ericson, courtesy of Cal Poly Humboldt Archive
- Species: Coast redwood (Sequoia sempervirens)
- Location: Fieldbrook, California
- Height: 99.06 m (325.0 ft)
- Diameter: 5.79 m (19.0 ft)
- Volume of trunk: 1,047.72 m^{3} (37,000 ft^{3})
- Date felled: January 1905

The Lindsay Creek Tree (commonly misspelled as Lindsey Creek Tree) was a notably large coast redwood (Sequoia sempervirens) that grew in Fieldbrook, California, along Lindsay Creek, which feeds into the Mad River. It was historically thought to be the largest single-stem organism (tree) known to have existed due to an erroneous article published in the Humboldt Times. In 2024, a second article was discovered that offered more accurate measurements of the tree. Although the tree was not as large as it was fabled to be, it would still likely rank within the top 5 largest coast redwoods alive today.

Its dimensions were measured by lumberman Henry A. Poland to be 325 ft (99.06 m) tall with a diameter of 19 ft (5.79 m) at its base, 14 ft (4.27 m) at a height of 125 ft (38.10 m), and 9 ft (2.74 m) at a height of 200 ft (60.96 m).

The tree stood on land owned by Dolbeer & Carson Lumber Company. In 1897, this firm contracted the Vance Mill & Lumber Company to log the area, which earned this tract the nickname Vance's Lindsay Creek Woods. This forest was locally famous for having some of the largest trees known in Humboldt County at the time, including the Fieldbrook Tree. By 1905, most of the Lindsay Creek Woods had been clearcut, but the Lindsay Creek Tree was left because it could not be effectively felled and saved. Being the only standing tree in the middle of a clearcut made it extremely vulnerable to weather and erosion, and it subsequently blew down in a storm in January 1905.

Before more accurate measurements were discovered, the tree's volume was estimated to be 90,000 ft³ (2548.52 m³) based on the first article claiming that it measured 19 ft (5.79 m) at a height of 120 ft (36.58 m), with a total height of 390 ft (118.87 m). This would have made the Lindsay Creek Tree twice the size of the current largest tree, General Sherman, and around ten feet taller than the current tallest tree, Hyperion. Now, the largest tree to ever exist historically is the Crannell Creek Giant.

== Discovery of photographs ==
Photographs of the tree were thought to have been lost until 2024, when a researcher located a set of five photographs in the Cal Poly Humboldt Archives that matched the description of the tree. These photographs were taken by famed Humboldt County photographer Augustus A. Ericson. Two of these photographs were titled with the measurements collected and published by Henry A. Poland. There is also evidence that these photographs were taken in Vance's Lindsay Creek Woods around the same time the tree fell. According to the researcher who located them, these facts prove within a reasonable doubt that the photographs are of the Lindsay Creek Tree.

Photographs of Lindsay Creek Tree, c. 1905
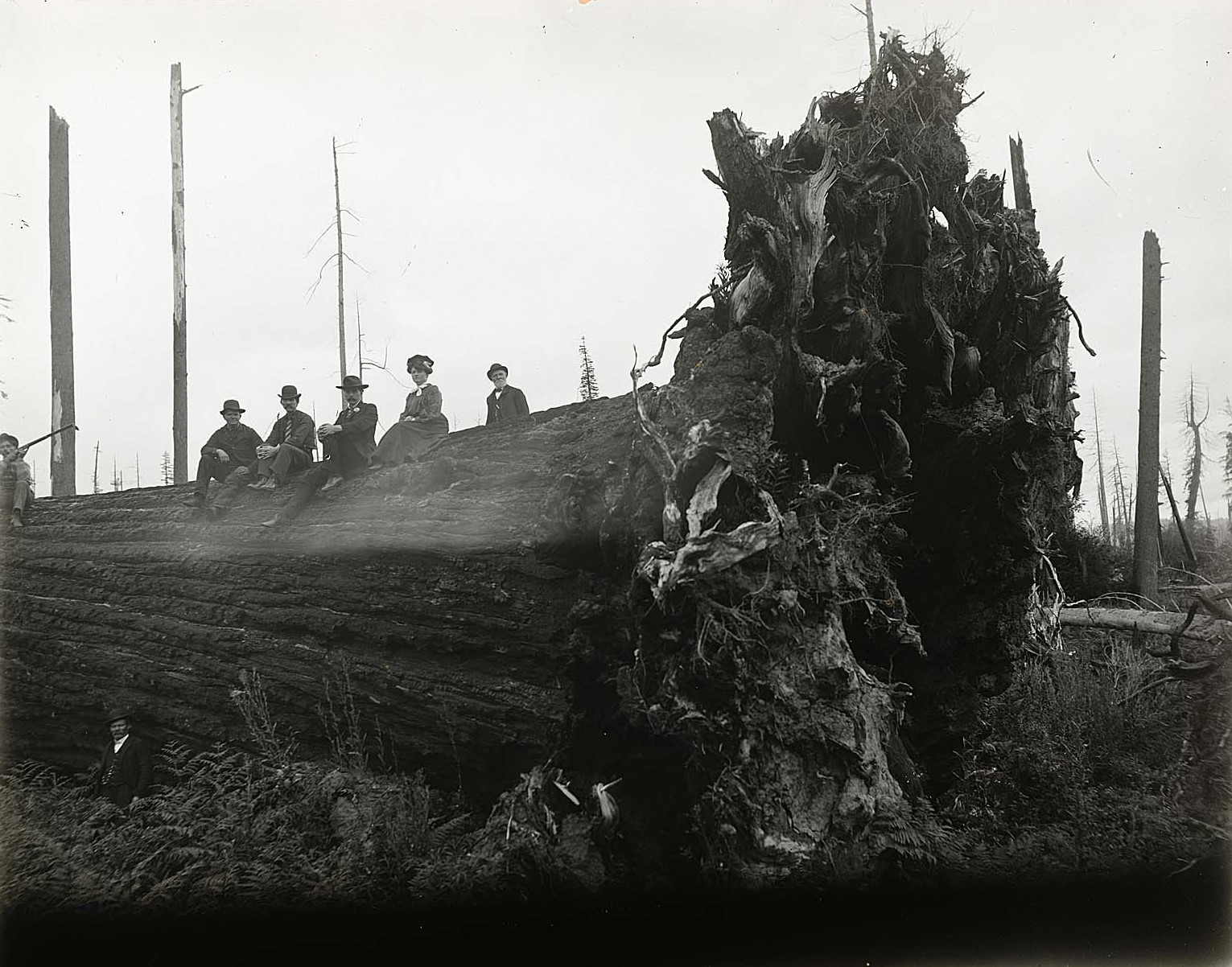
Lower trunk with exposed roots

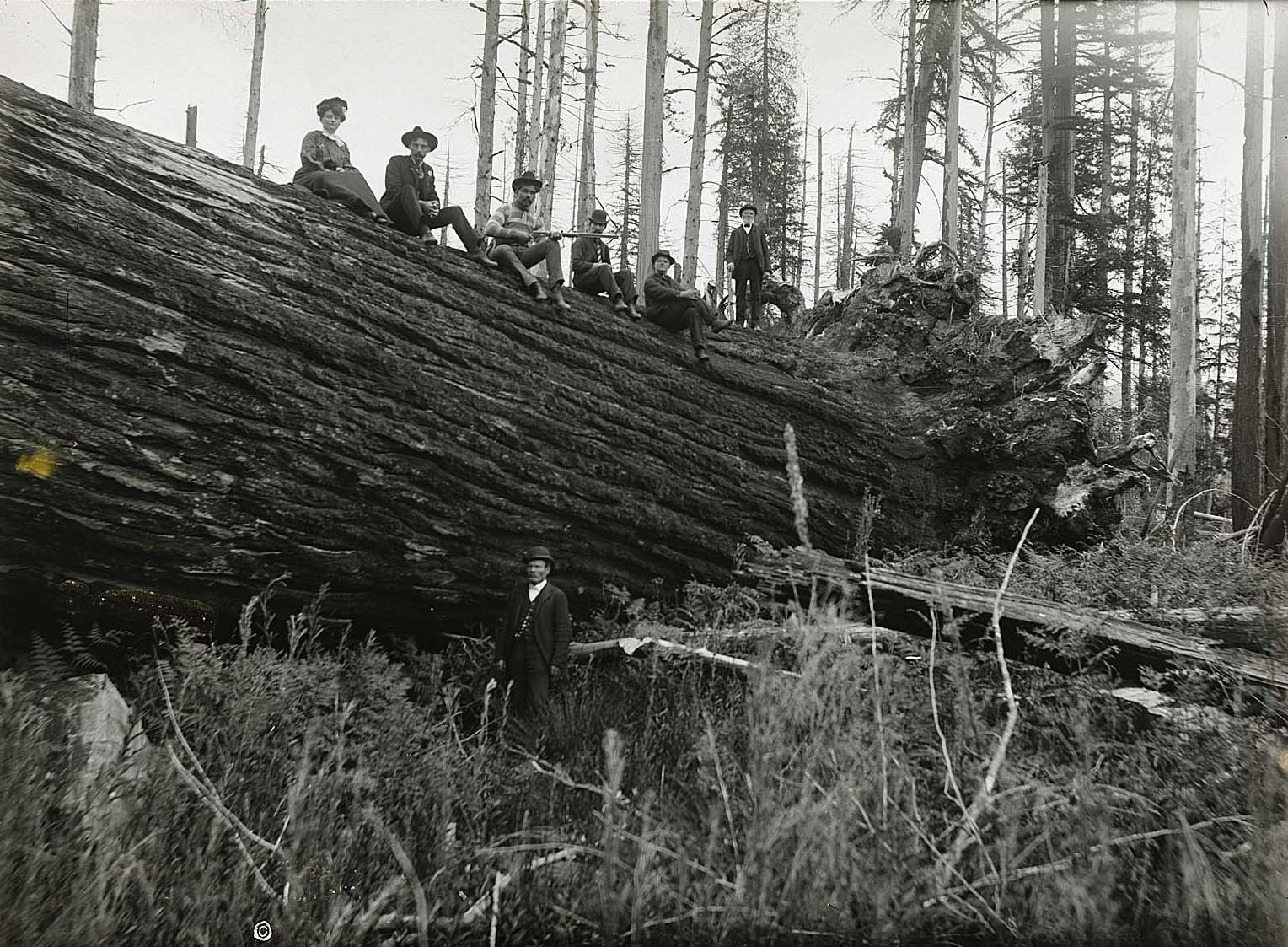
Lower trunk and roots with six people present

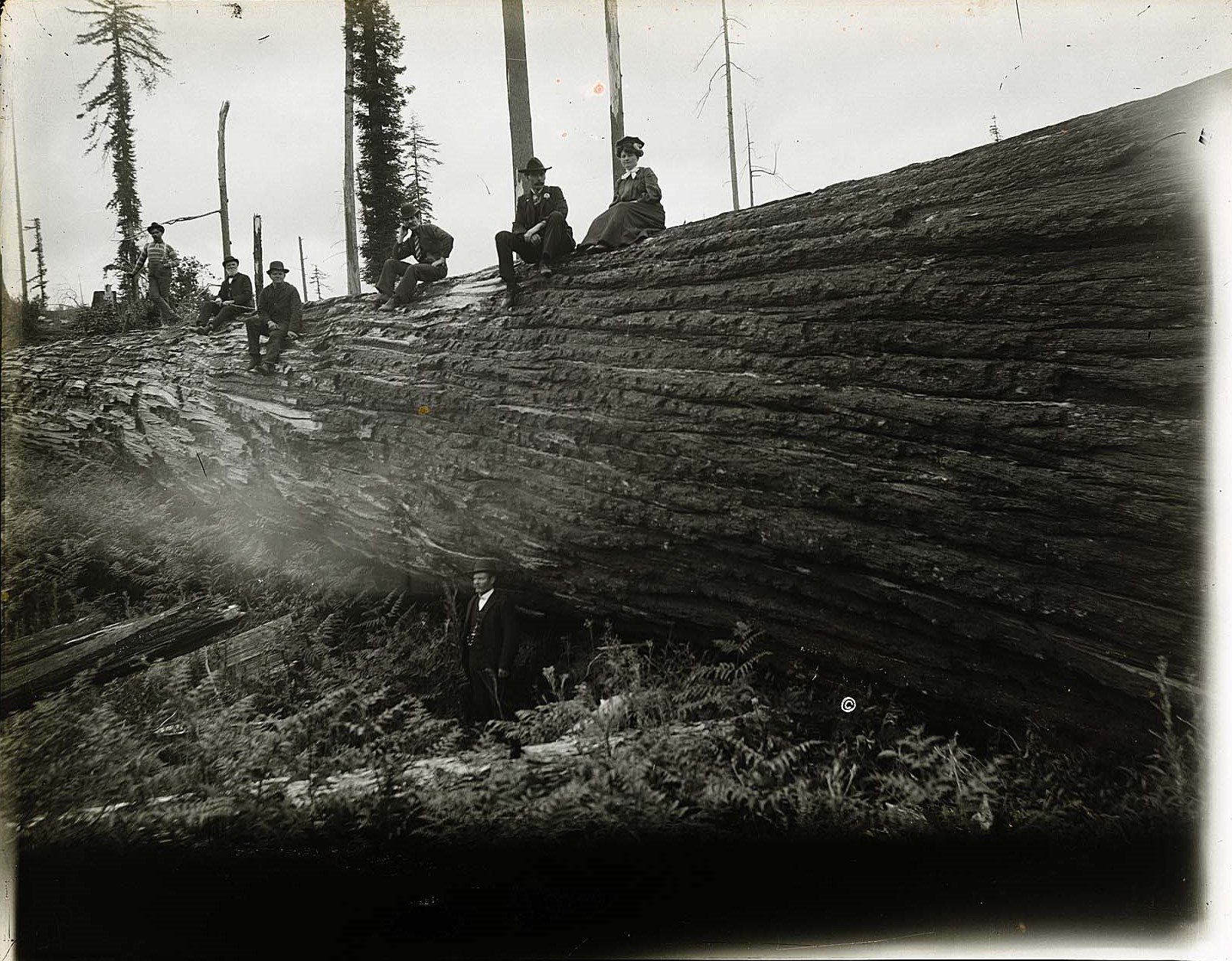
Lower trunk with six people present

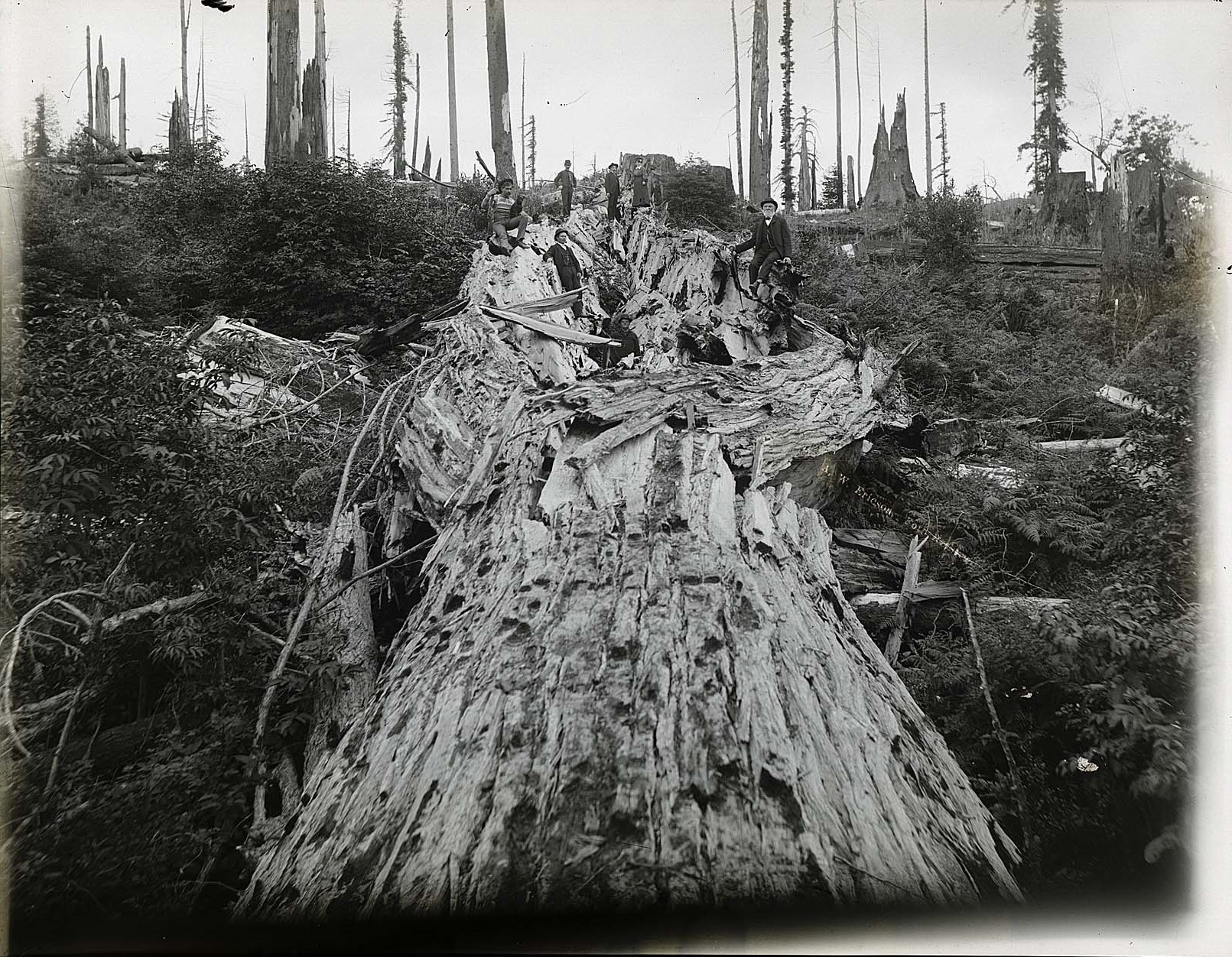
Upper trunk with six people present

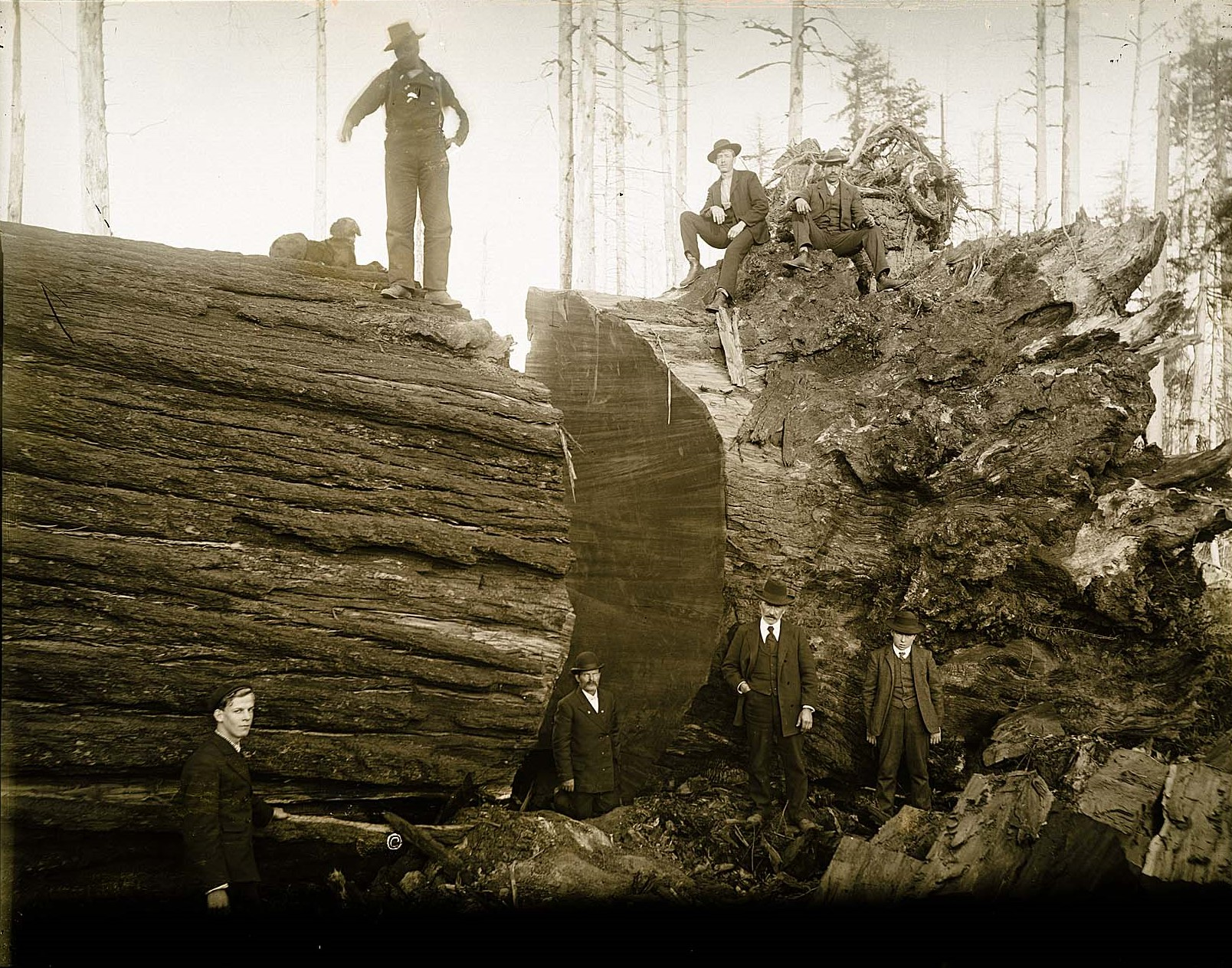
Lower trunk after being cut

== Johnson claims ==
Skip Johnson, a Fieldbrook logger interviewed in 1971, testified that he witnessed the Lindsay Creek Tree after it had fallen. He reported it as the tallest tree in Fieldbrook. He stated that a family member measured its diameter at 19 ft (5.8 m) at 130 ft (40 m) off the ground, and 9 1/2 ft (2.9 m) at 260 ft (79 m) off the ground, and its total height slightly exceeded 390 ft (120 m). These claims are unfounded, however, and the source documents of Skip Johnson's testimony have not been located.

Fairly solid evidence indicates that coast redwoods were the world's largest trees before logging, with numerous historical specimens reportedly over 400 ft (122 m). Hyperion, another coast redwood (Sequoia sempervirens), currently the tallest, is 115.85 m (380.1 ft), which also makes it the world's tallest known living tree.

== See also ==
- List of superlative trees
- List of individual trees
