= Lindsay Creek (Mad River tributary) =

Stream in Humboldt County, California, U.S.

Coordinates: 40°54′05″N 124°01′48″W

Lindsay Creek is a stream in Humboldt County, California, in the United States. It is a tributary of the Mad River.

Lindsay Creek was named for a pioneer settler. During the early industrial logging era, the woods that surrounded Lindsay Creek was famous for having some of the largest coast redwood trees ever known, including the Lindsay Creek tree.

== See also ==
- List of rivers of California
