= Fern Canyon =

Canyon in Prairie Creek Redwoods State Park, Humboldt County, California, US

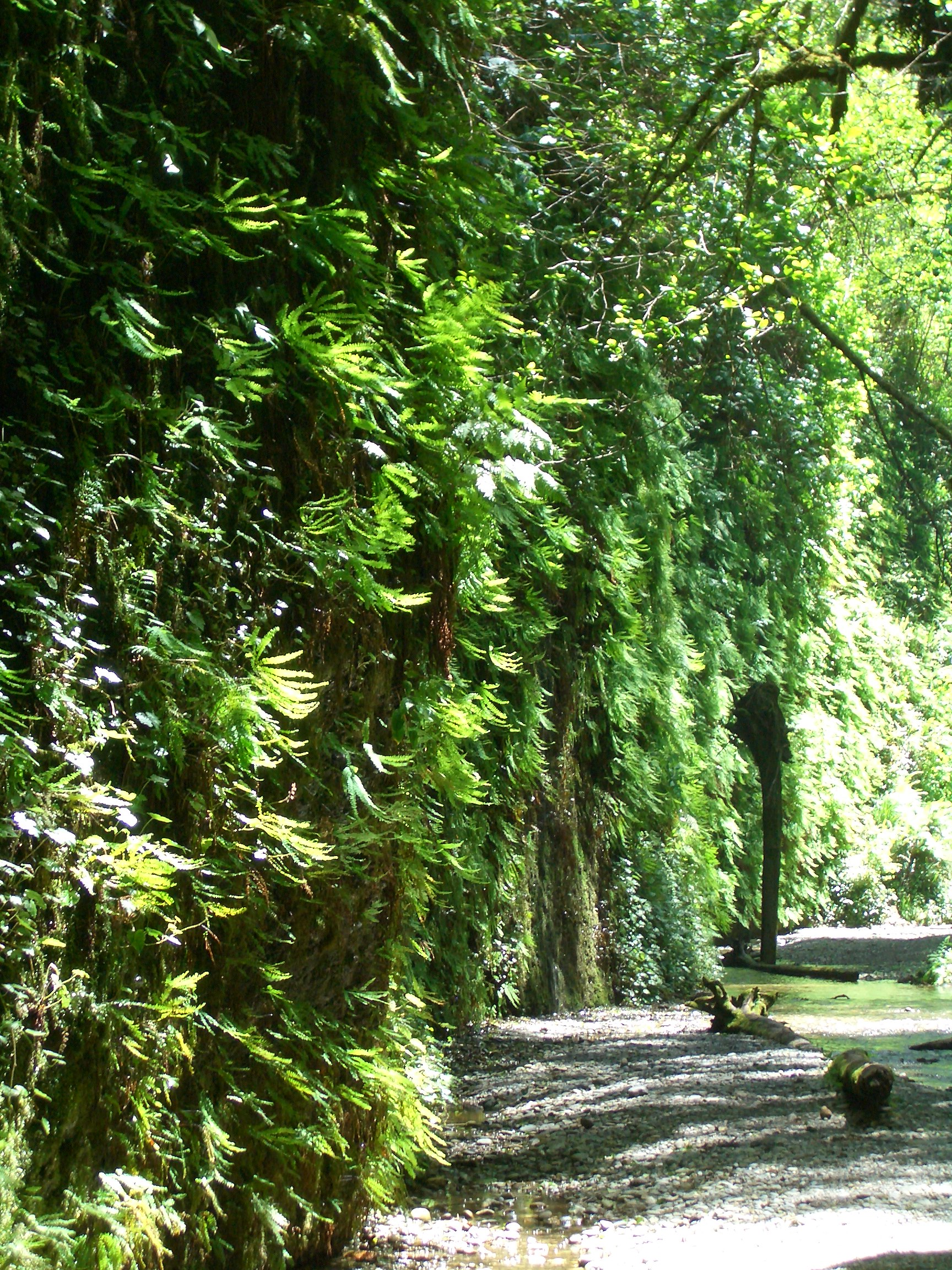
Fern Canyon, Prairie Creek Redwoods State Park, California

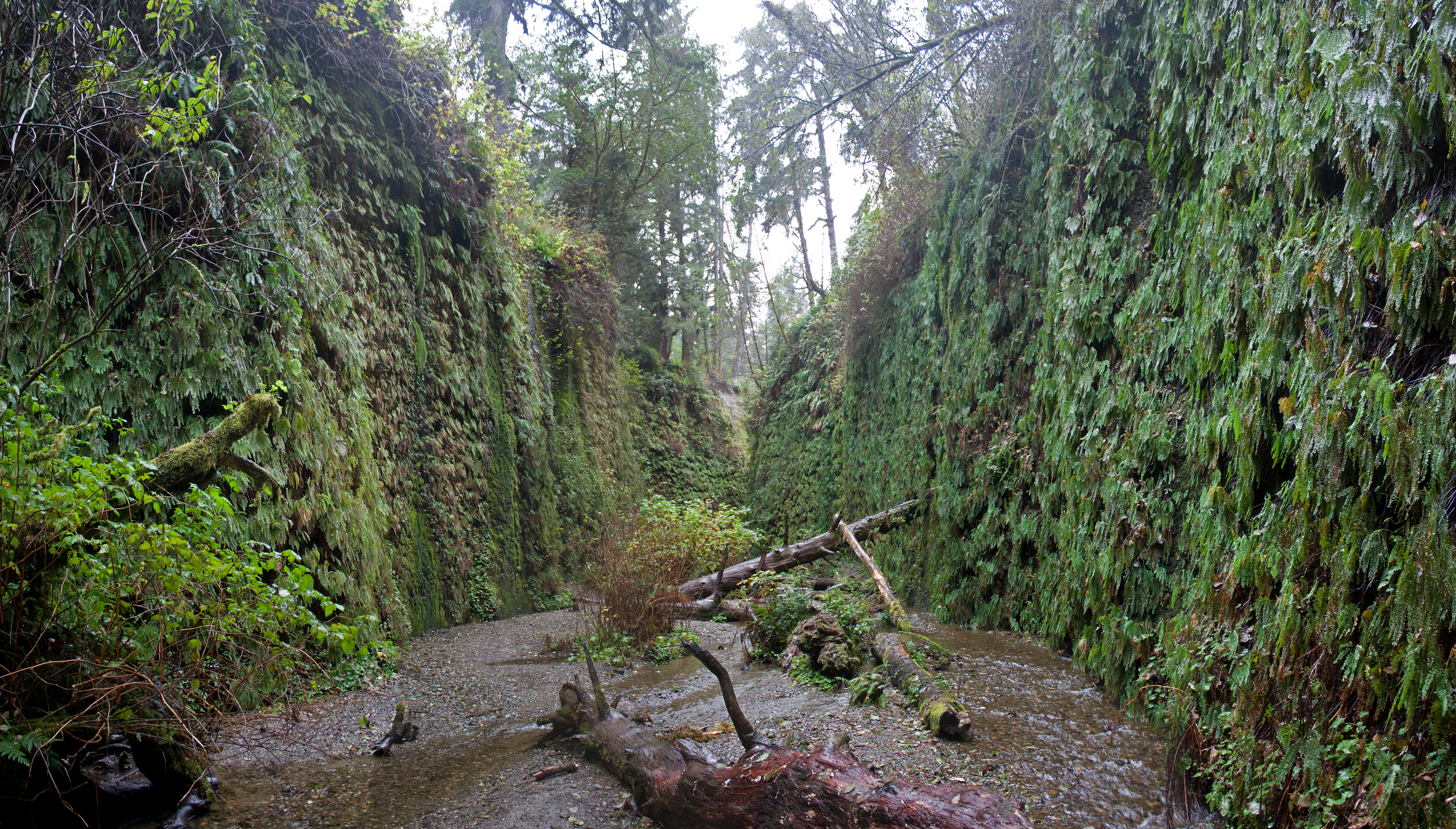
Panorama of Fern Canyon

Fern Canyon is a canyon in the Prairie Creek Redwoods State Park in Humboldt County, California, United States. The park is managed in cooperation with other nearby redwoods state parks and Redwood National Park. It is named for the ferns growing on the 50-foot (15 m) high walls, through which runs Home Creek. Fern Canyon is an International Biosphere Reserve.

== History ==
Fern Canyon was donated by the Pacific Lumber Company to the State to add 2,125 acres (860 ha; 3.320 mi^{2}; 8.60 km^{2}) to Prairie Creek State Park. In 1968, the US government made the redwoods, including Fern Canyon, a national park, protecting the land. In 1980, it was designated a World Heritage State and an International Biosphere Reserve. This was done to better protect land like Fern Canyon and the redwoods.

== Yurok people ==
The Yurok people are indigenous to this land, living there for many generations. The “temperate climate and abundant wildlife” provided a good place to live and natural resources. They often traveled by dugout canoes, often made out of redwood trees. However, in 1850, during the larger Gold Rush of California, gold was discovered on Yurok land, bringing a major wave of settlers invading their land. This led to about 75% of the Yurok people dying, and the remaining population was moved to the Yurok Reservation which was established in 1855. The Yurok people continued to be abused and mistreated for decades, and the land was exploited for timber.

== Common plants and animals ==
- American dipper bird or Cinclus Mexicanus
- Seep monkey flower or Erythranthe guttata
- Redwood sorrel or Oxalis oregana

Fern Canyon has California native ferns covering the 10–15 metres (33–49 ft) sheer walls, giving a primeval habitat quality. Some species include:

- Adiantum aleuticum
- Struthiopteris spicant
- Polypodium californicum
- Polypodium glycyrrhiza
- Polystichum munitum

== Access ==
A hiking trail follows the canyon and creek. The start of Fern Canyon Trail is reached at the bottom of the canyon by hiking a quarter mile north up California Coastal Trail from Fern Canyon Day Use Area, which is north of Gold Bluffs Beach Campground. The trail loop is 0.5 miles (0.80 km), one end of the trail connecting to the James Irvine Trail.

== Filming location ==
The prehistoric ambience led to the canyon being used as a filming location for The Lost World: Jurassic Park, BBC's Walking with Dinosaurs and IMAX's Dinosaurs Alive!

== Gallery ==
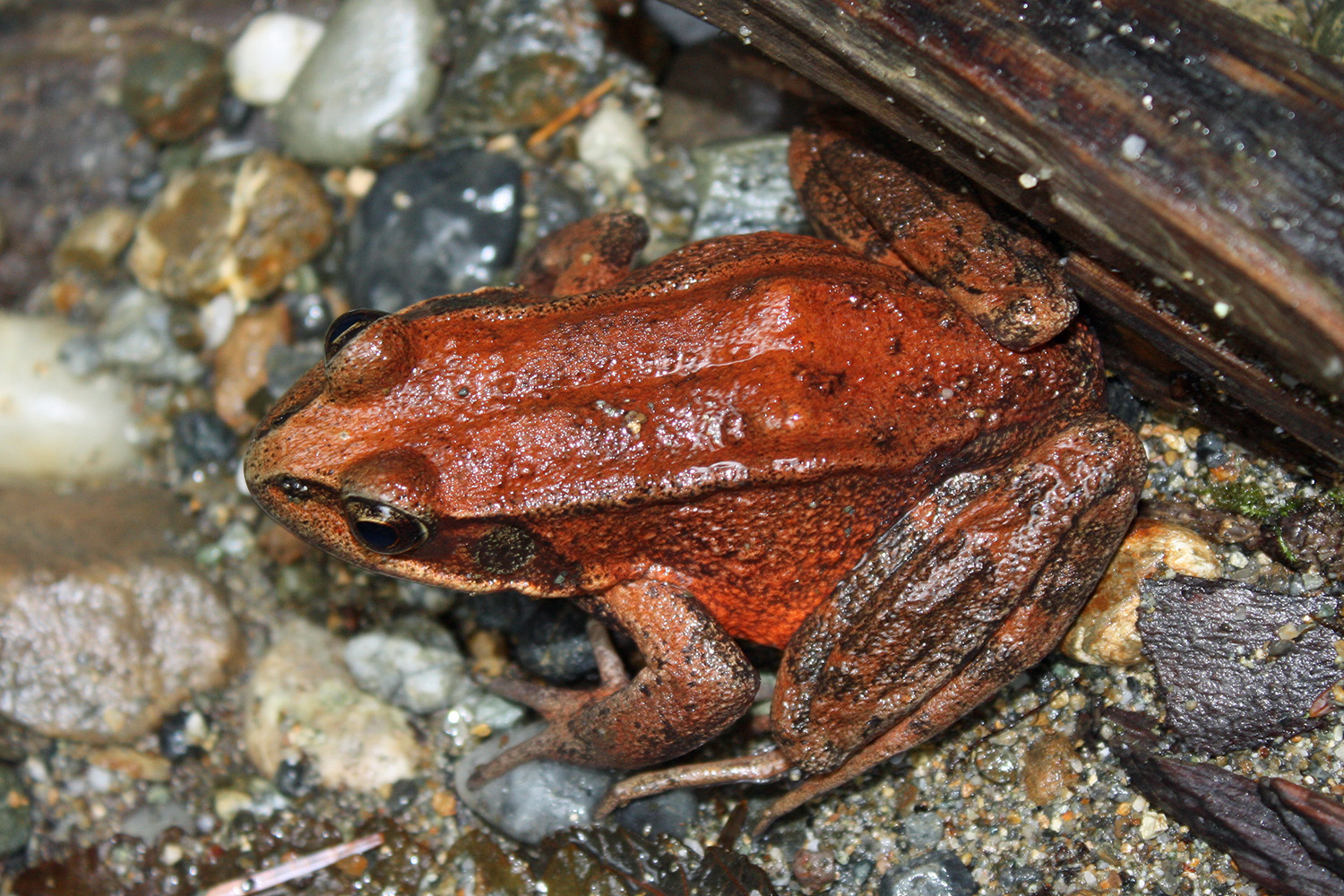
A northern red-legged frog, Rana aurora, in Fern Canyon

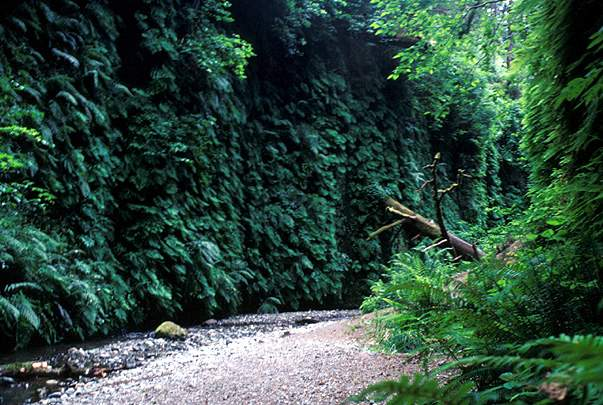
Fern Canyon's lush walls

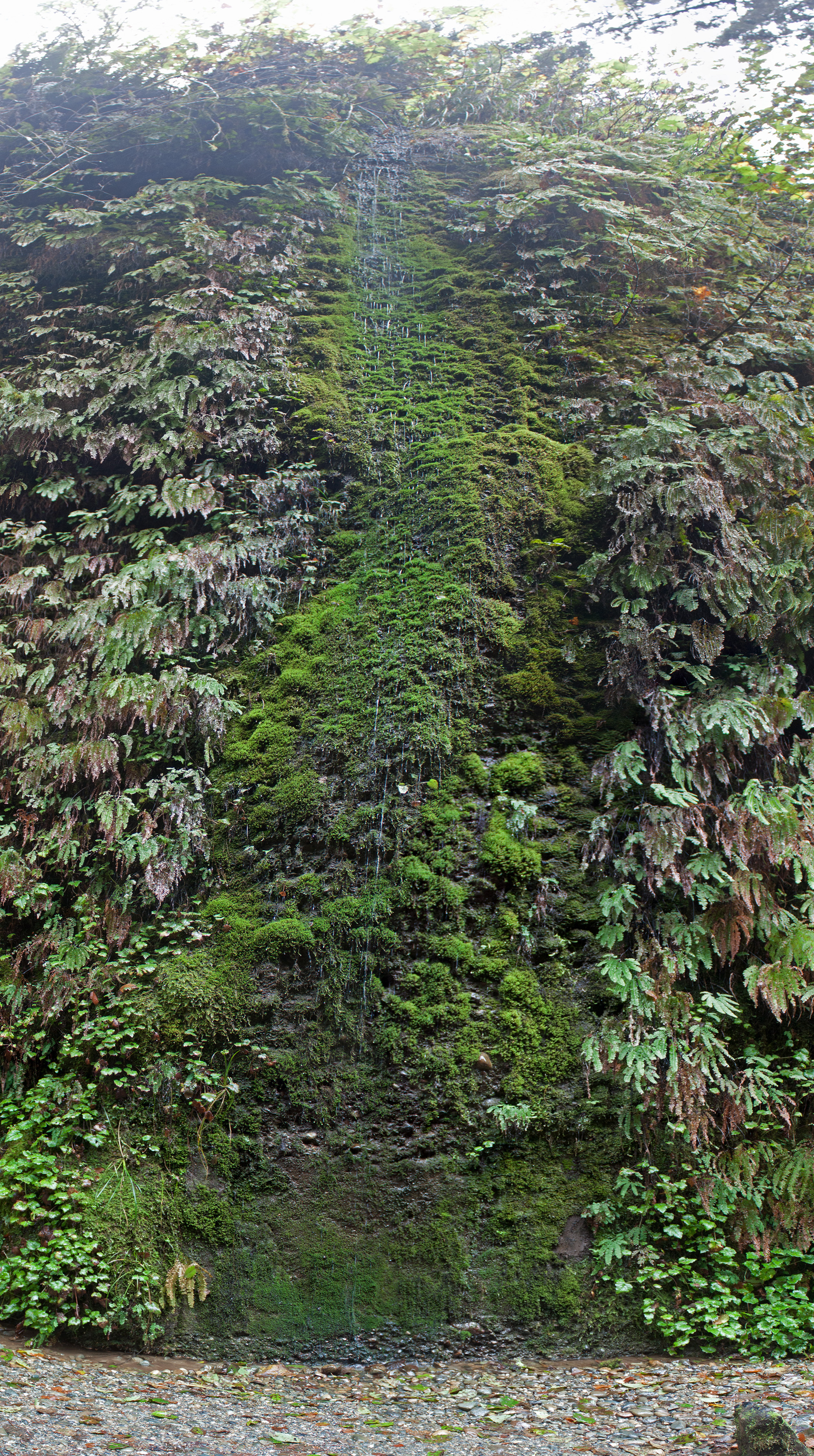
Moss cascades down the side of Fern Canyon where water trickles over the edge.

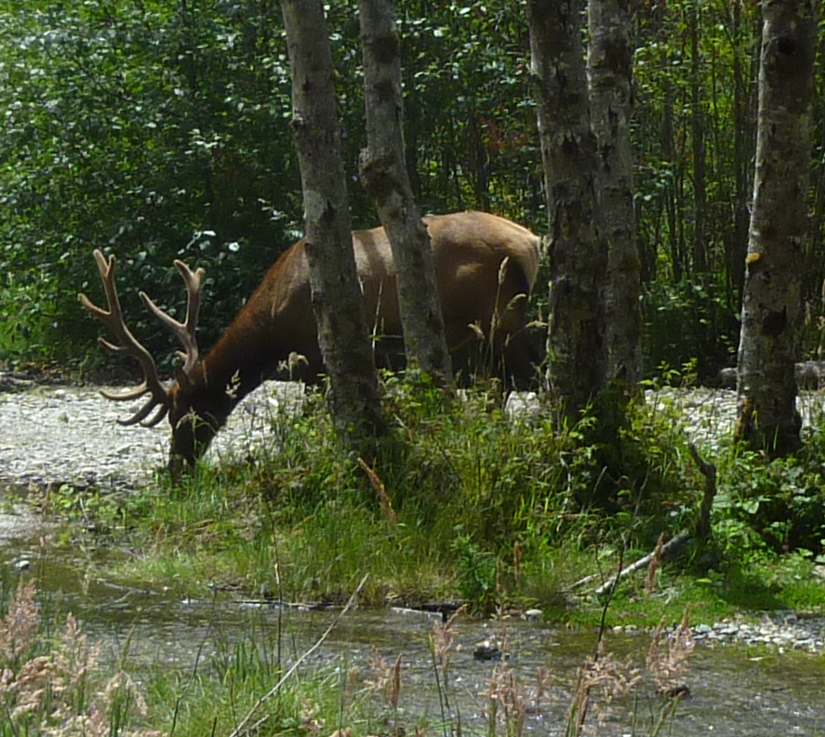
Roosevelt elk at the entrance to Fern Canyon

Fern Canyon in Prairie Creek Redwoods State Park
