= Fieldbrook, California =

Fieldbrook
- census-designated place
- Location of Fieldbrook in Humboldt County, California.

- Location in California
- Coordinates: 40°57′56″N 124°02′08″W
- Country: United States
- State: California
- County: Humboldt

Area
  - Total: 10.471 sq mi (27.121 km^{2})
  - Land: 10.468 sq mi (27.111 km^{2})
  - Water: 0.0039 sq mi (0.010 km^{2}) 0.04%
- Elevation: 203 ft (62 m)

Population (2020)
  - Total: 827
  - Density: 79.0/sq mi (30.5/km^{2})
- Time zone: UTC-8 (Pacific (PST))
  - Summer (DST): UTC-7 (PDT)
- ZIP Code: 95519
- Area code: 707
- GNIS feature ID: 223487; 2611430

Fieldbrook (formerly Bokman's Prairie and Buckman's Prairie) is a census-designated place in Humboldt County, California, United States. It is located 7 miles (11 km) north-east of Arcata, at an elevation of 203 feet (62 m). The population was 827 at the 2020 census.

== Geography ==
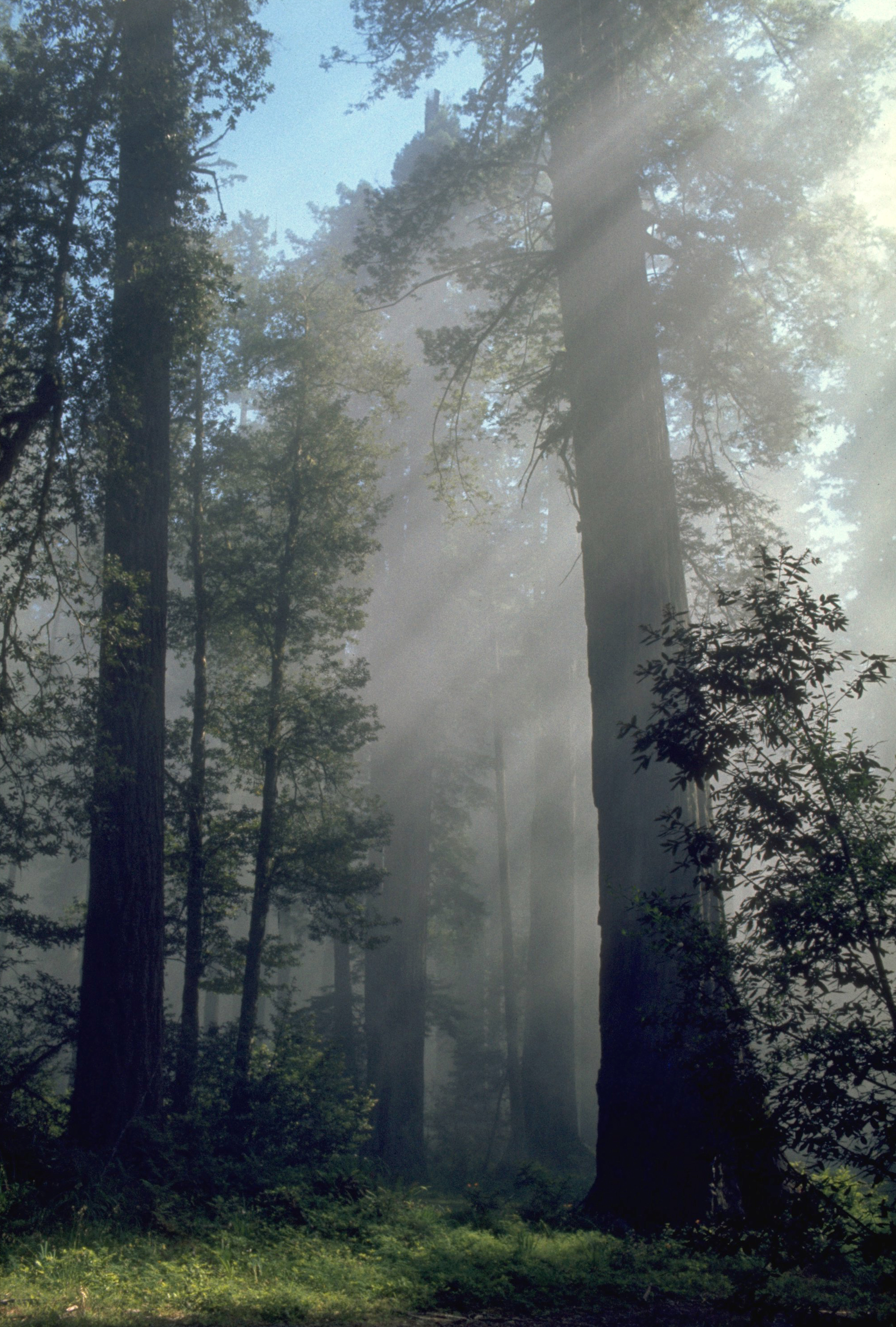
A redwood tree in the area.

Fieldbrook is located on California's North Coast, approximately 300 miles (480 km) north of San Francisco and 65 miles (105 km) south of the Oregon state line. Located on the edge of dense redwood forest, the area was once home to thriving lumber companies. Fieldbrook is 6 miles (10 km) east of the larger, unincorporated, seaside town of McKinleyville and the Arcata-Eureka Airport, approximately 10 miles (16 km) northeast of the harbor city of Arcata, and about 18.2 miles (29.3 km) north of the city of Eureka, the Humboldt County seat. Fieldbrook is at the northern edge of the McKinleyville-Arcata-Eureka-Fortuna corridor along US Highway 101, where about eighty percent of Humboldt County's population lives and most of its businesses are located. The ZIP Code is 95519. The community is inside area code 707.

Fieldbrook is located at the right-angle bend where Murray Road becomes Fieldbrook Road. In the mid-1990s, Fieldbrook was a stereotypical sleepy country hamlet, with junk cars sitting in weedy yards along the main road in one block and goats grazing alongside a church in the next. With the decline of the local timber industry, the increase of remote working professionals, and the emergence of the North Coast as a retirement destination, Fieldbrook with its mild weather (summer temperatures seldom exceed 75 °F (24 °C) and winter nights rarely drop below 38 °F (3 °C) has undergone gentrification. Sprawling ranch-style (single-story) homes on isolated 5-acre (20,000 m^{2}) lots wedged between timber tracts are selling for $500,000, and at least one 40-acre (160,000 m^{2}) timber tract has become a gated community.

The few blocks of paved and unpaved roads that comprise Fieldbrook property include modest homes, an elementary school and two churches, as well as a general store, a winery and an apple orchard that host public events. Larger residences whose owners identify with the Fieldbrook community continue south along Fieldbrook Road as it heads inland and uphill 6 miles (10 km) to the small city of Blue Lake (population 1,200) at the foot of the Coast Range. The road connects there with State Highway 299, a winding route that crosses the mountains and connects with Interstate 5 in Redding, about 90 miles (140 km) east.

Fieldbrook is on the north bank of the Mad River, which flows into the Pacific Ocean. Although the Mad River supplies the water to much of Humboldt County's population, the small population does not have a significant impact on the river's flow. The north side of Fieldbrook Road is second-growth (coppice, multiple thinner trunks sprouting from the stumps of harvested trees) redwood forest with the occasional clearing for a house, and the logging rules allow the forest canopy to maintain a height of 200 to 300 feet (61 to 91 m). A narrow zone adjacent to the road is maintained as an unlogged buffer, presenting the illusion of virgin forest to tourists. On the north side of the buffer, in any given year the majority of the timber tracts have been growing for at least seven years, comprising a wilderness if not exactly parkland. The region is rich with wildlife and animals like deer, elk, foxes, raccoons, and the occasional black bear or cougar are found.

== History ==
A post office operated in Fieldbrook from 1902 to 1932. In the late 1800s to early 1900s, much of Fieldbrook was owned by lumber companies. Railroad lines ran through Fieldbrook to the Humboldt Bay.

== Education ==
Fieldbrook is the seat of the Fieldbrook Elementary School District, and home of the Fieldbrook School, a public K-8 school.

== Demographics ==
Historical population
Census	Pop.	Note	%±
2010	859		—
2020	827		−3.7%
U.S. Decennial Census; 2010

Fieldbrook first appeared as a census designated place in the 2010 U.S. census.

The 2020 United States census reported that Fieldbrook had a population of 827. The population density was 79.0 inhabitants per square mile (30.5/km^{2}). The racial makeup of Fieldbrook was 685 (82.8%) White, 7 (0.8%) African American, 19 (2.3%) Native American, 5 (0.6%) Asian, 3 (0.4%) Pacific Islander, 14 (1.7%) from other races, and 94 (11.4%) from two or more races. Hispanic or Latino of any race were 46 persons (5.6%).

The whole population lived in households. There were 344 households, out of which 80 (23.3%) had children under the age of 18 living in them, 178 (51.7%) were married-couple households, 27 (7.8%) were cohabiting couple households, 62 (18.0%) had a female householder with no partner present, and 77 (22.4%) had a male householder with no partner present. 93 households (27.0%) were one person, and 36 (10.5%) were one person aged 65 or older. The average household size was 2.4. There were 215 families (62.5% of all households).

The age distribution was 145 people (17.5%) under the age of 18, 35 people (4.2%) aged 18 to 24, 178 people (21.5%) aged 25 to 44, 221 people (26.7%) aged 45 to 64, and 248 people (30.0%) who were 65 years of age or older. The median age was 51.6 years. For every 100 females, there were 97.4 males.

There were 377 housing units at an average density of 36.0 units per square mile (13.9 units/km^{2}), of which 344 (91.2%) were occupied. Of these, 279 (81.1%) were owner-occupied, and 65 (18.9%) were occupied by renters.

== Government ==
In the state legislature, Fieldbrook is in the 2nd senatorial district, represented by Democrat Mike McGuire, and the 2nd Assembly district, represented by Democrat Chris Rogers.

Federally, Fieldbrook is in California's 2nd congressional district, represented by Jared Huffman.
