= Terri Clark discography =

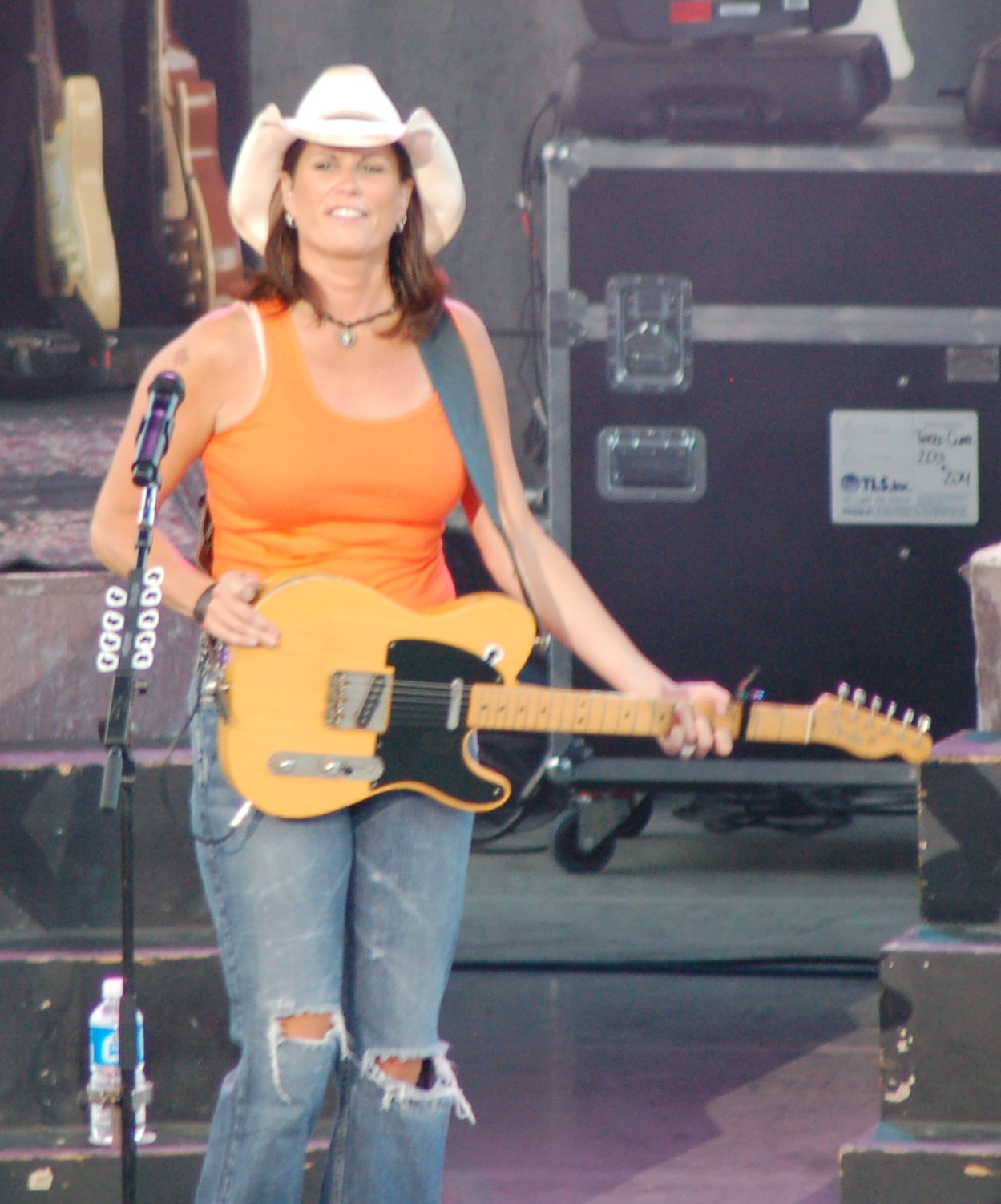
- Terri Clark in concert, 2006.
- Studio albums: 12
- Live albums: 1
- Compilation albums: 3
- Singles: 43
- Video albums: 1
- Music videos: 27

Canadian country music artist Terri Clark has released 12 studio albums, 1 live album, 3 compilation albums, 27 music videos and 43 singles. In 1994, she signed her first recording contract with Mercury Nashville Records. Her self-titled debut studio album was released in 1995. Its first three singles became top 10 hits on both the Billboard and Canadian country charts: "Better Things to Do", "When Boy Meets Girl", and "If I Were You". Clark's second studio album Just the Same was released in 1996. "Poor Poor Pitiful Me" was issued as the lead single, peaking at number 5 on the Billboard Hot Country Songs chart. In 1998, Clark's third studio album How I Feel was released. The album spawned four singles including "You're Easy on the Eyes", which topped both the American and Canadian country charts. How I Feel would also become Clark's third album to certify platinum in sales from the RIAA and the MC.

In September 2000, Clark's fourth studio album Fearless was released. Critically acclaimed, the lead single "A Little Gasoline" became a major hit. Pain to Kill (2003) spawned two major hits, including "I Just Wanna Be Mad", which reached number three on the Billboard country chart. In 2004, her first compilation Greatest Hits 1994–2004 was released. The album spawned "Girls Lie Too", which became Clark's second number one country single in the United States. After the release of her next studio album Life Goes On (2005), Clark exited Mercury Records. In 2007, Clark signed with BNA Records, intending to release the studio album In My Next Life. In 2008, Clark left BNA to focus on her career in Canada and the project was shelved. Instead, Clark issued her first live album in 2009, which was followed by her next studio release The Long Way Home. Her next studio album Roots and Wings (2011) was released on her own BareTracks label. Its lead single "Northern Girl" became a top 10 hit on the Canadian country chart. Her tenth studio album Some Songs was issued in 2014, peaking at number 21 on the Canadian Albums Chart. In September 2018, Raising the Bar was released and featured the single "Young as We Are Tonight". In 2024, Clark released Terri Clark: Take Two, a duets album featuring re-recorded versions of her past hits.

== Albums ==
=== Studio albums ===
List of albums, with selected chart positions and certifications, showing year released and album name
Title	Album details	Peak chart positions					Certifications
Title	Album details	CAN	CAN Cou.	AUS	US	US Cou.	Certifications
Terri Clark	Released: August 8, 1995; Label: Mercury Nashville; Formats: Cassette, CD	—	2	—	79	13	MC: 3× Platinum; RIAA: Platinum
Just the Same	Released: November 5, 1996; Label: Mercury Nashville; Formats: Cassette, CD	47	3	—	58	10	MC: 2× Platinum; RIAA: Platinum
How I Feel	Released: May 19, 1998; Label: Mercury Nashville; Formats: Cassette, CD	38	4	—	70	10	MC: Platinum; RIAA: Platinum
Fearless	Released: September 19, 2000; Label: Mercury Nashville; Formats: Cassette, CD	—	4	—	85	8	MC: Gold
Pain to Kill	Released: January 14, 2003; Label: Mercury Nashville; Formats: CD	—	—	86	27	5	
Life Goes On	Released: November 1, 2005; Label: Mercury Nashville; Formats: CD, music download	—	—	—	26	4	
The Long Way Home	Released: September 1, 2009; Label: BareTrack/Capitol/EMI; Formats:CD, music download	15	—	—	—	44	
Roots and Wings	Released: July 26, 2011; Label: BareTrack/EMI; Formats: CD, music download	24	—	—	—	69	
Classic	Released: November 13, 2012; Label: BareTrack/EMI; Formats: CD, music download	—	—	—	—	—	
Some Songs	Released: September 2, 2014; Label: BareTrack/Universal; Formats: CD, music download	21	—	—	—	—	
Raising the Bar	Released: September 14, 2018; Label: BareTrack; Formats: CD, music download	—	—	—	—	— (Note: Raising the Bar did not enter Top Country Albums, but peaked at number 23 on Country Album Sales and number 42 on the Independent Albums chart.)	
It's Christmas...Cheers!	Released: September 25, 2020; Label: BareTrack/Mercury Nashville; Formats: CD, LP, music download	—	—	—	—	—	
Take Two	Released: May 31, 2024; Label: Mercury Nashville/UMe; Formats: CD, LP, music download	—	—	—	—	—	
"—" denotes a recording that did not chart or was not released in that territory.

=== Compilation albums ===
List of albums, with selected chart positions and certifications, showing year released and album name
Title	Album details	Peak chart positions		Certifications
Title	Album details	US	US Cou.	Certifications
Greatest Hits 1994–2004	Released: July 27, 2004; Label: Mercury Nashville; Formats: CD, music download	14	4	MC: Gold; RIAA: Gold
20th Century Masters: The Millennium Collection	Released: August 29, 2006; Label: Mercury Nashville; Formats: CD, music download	—	—	
The Definitive Collection	Released: February 5, 2008; Label: Mercury Nashville; Formats: CD, music download	—	—	
"—" denotes a recording that did not chart or was not released in that territory.

=== Live albums ===
List of albums showing year released and album name
Title	Album details
Terri Clark Live: Road Rage	Release date: July 8, 2009; Label: BareTrack; Formats: CD, music download
Terri Clark: Live From The Ryman	Release date: October 30, 2026; Label: BareTrack; Formats: CD, vinyl, music download, streaming

== Singles ==
=== As lead artist ===
List of singles, with selected chart positions, showing year released and album name
Title	Year	Peak chart positions				Album
Title	Year	CAN	CAN Cou. (Note: Chart positions from RPM Country Tracks from 1995 to 2000, Radio & Records from 2004 to 2006, and Canada Country from 2007 to present.)	US	US Cou.	Album
"Better Things to Do"	1995	—	3	—	3	Terri Clark
"When Boy Meets Girl"	1995	—	3	— (Note: "When Boy Meets Girl" did not enter the Hot 100, but peaked at number 22 on Bubbling Under Hot 100 Singles, which acts as a 25-song extension of the Hot 100.)	3	Terri Clark
"If I Were You"	1996	—	1	— (Note: "If I Were You" did not enter the Hot 100, but peaked at number 13 on Bubbling Under Hot 100 Singles, which acts as a 25-song extension of the Hot 100.)	8	Terri Clark
"Suddenly Single"	1996	—	11	—	34	Terri Clark
"Poor Poor Pitiful Me"	1996	—	1	— (Note: "Poor Poor Pitiful Me" did not enter the Hot 100, but peaked at number 9 on Bubbling Under Hot 100 Singles, which acts as a 25-song extension of the Hot 100.)	5	Just the Same
"Emotional Girl"	1997	—	1	— (Note: "Emotional Girl" did not enter the Hot 100, but peaked at number 13 on Bubbling Under Hot 100 Singles, which acts as a 25-song extension of the Hot 100.)	10	Just the Same
"Just the Same"	1997	—	16	—	49	Just the Same
"Something in the Water"	1997	—	39	—	—	Just the Same
"Now That I Found You"	1998	—	2	72	2	How I Feel
"You're Easy on the Eyes"	1998	—	1	40	1	How I Feel
"Everytime I Cry"	1999	—	2	69	12	How I Feel
"Unsung Hero"	1999	—	15	—	47	How I Feel
"A Little Gasoline"	2000	—	9	75	13	Fearless
"No Fear"	2001	—	x	—	27	Fearless
"Getting There"	2001	—	x	—	41	Fearless
"Empty"	2001	—	x	—	—	Fearless
"I Just Wanna Be Mad"	2002	—	x	27	2	Pain to Kill
"Three Mississippi"	2003	—	x	—	30	Pain to Kill
"I Wanna Do It All"	2003	—	x	38	3	Pain to Kill
"Girls Lie Too"	2004	—	2	36	1	Greatest Hits 1994–2004
"The World Needs a Drink"	2004	—	24	—	26	Honky Tonk Songs (unreleased)
"She Didn't Have Time"	2005	—	15	— (Note: "She Didn't Have Time" did not enter the Hot 100, but peaked at number 15 on Bubbling Under Hot 100 Singles, which acts as a 25-song extension of the Hot 100.)	25	Life Goes On
"Damn Right"	2006	—	—	—	—	Life Goes On
"Slow News Day"	2006	—	12	—	—	Life Goes On
"Dirty Girl"	2007	68	13	—	30	My Next Life (unreleased)
"In My Next Life"	2007	66	1	—	36	My Next Life (unreleased)
"Gypsy Boots"	2009	92	9	—	—	The Long Way Home
"If You Want Fire"	2009	85	5	—	—	The Long Way Home
"A Million Ways to Run"	2010	—	16	—	—	The Long Way Home
"You Tell Me" (featuring Johnny Reid)	2010	—	16	—	—	The Long Way Home
"Northern Girl"	2011	—	8	—	—	Roots and Wings
"We're Here for a Good Time"	2011	98	10	—	—	Roots and Wings
"The One"	2011	—	13	—	—	Roots and Wings
"Wrecking Ball"	2012	—	29	—	—	Roots and Wings
"Love Is a Rose"	2012	—	31	—	—	Classic
"I'm Movin' On" (featuring Dean Brody)	2013	—	28	—	—	Classic
"Some Songs"	2014	—	20	—	—	Some Songs
"Longer"	2014	—	28	—	—	Some Songs
"I Cheated on You"	2015	—	—	—	—	Some Songs
"One Drink Ago" (with Dallas Smith)	2018	—	3	—	—	non-album single
"Young as We Are Tonight"	2018	—	21	—	—	Raising the Bar
"The Highway"	2021	—	—	—	—	non-album single
"—" denotes releases that did not chart "x" indicates that no relevant chart existed at the time

=== As a featured artist ===
List of singles, with selected chart positions, showing year released and album name
Title	Year	Peak chart positions		Album
Title	Year	CAN Cou.	US Cou.	Album
"Hope" (as "Hope: Country Music's Quest for a Cure") (Note: "Hope: Country Music's Quest for a Cure" was a multi-artist collaboration featuring John Berry, Terri Clark, Vince Gill, Faith Hill, Tracy Lawrence, Little Texas, Neal McCoy, Tim McGraw, Lorrie Morgan, Marty Stuart, Travis Tritt, and Trisha Yearwood.)	1996	—	57	non-album single
"I Ain't Drunk" (Gord Bamford featuring Terri Clark)	2022	38	—	Diamonds in a Whiskey Glass
"Dents on a Chevy" (Ty Herndon featuring Terri Clark)	2023	—	—	Jacob
"—" denotes releases that did not chart

== Other charted songs ==
List of songs, with selected chart positions, showing year released and album name
Title	Year	Peak chart positions	Album
Title	Year	US Country	Album
"O Little Town of Bethlehem"	2008	60	Hear Something Country Christmas 2007

== Videography ==
=== Video albums ===
Title	Details
Videos and More	Released: October 20, 1998; Label: Mercury Nashville; Formats: VHS

=== Music videos ===
List of music videos, showing year released and director
Title	Year	Director(s)	Ref.
"Better Things to Do"	1995	Michael Merriman	
"When Boy Meets Girl"	1995	Michael Merriman	
"If I Were You"	1996	Michael Merriman	
"Poor Poor Pitiful Me"	1996	Deaton-Flanigen	
"Emotional Girl"	1997	Michael Merriman	
"Just the Same"	1997	Michael Merriman	
"Now That I Found You"	1998	Steven Goldmann	
"You're Easy on the Eyes"	1998	Steven Goldmann	
"Everytime I Cry"	1999	Morgan Lawley	
"A Little Gasoline"	2000	Steven Goldmann	
"Empty"	2000	Steven Goldmann	
"No Fear"	2001	Eric Welch	
"I Just Wanna Be Mad"	2002	Deaton-Flanigen	
"Three Mississippi"	2003	Deaton-Flanigen	
"I Wanna Do It All" (Live)	2003	Milton Lage	
"Girls Lie Too"	2004	Scott Mele, Shaun Silva	
"The World Needs a Drink"	2004	Thom Oliphant	
"She Didn't Have Time"	2005	Trey Fanjoy	
"Dirty Girl"	2007	Kristin Barlowe	
"Gypsy Boots"	2009	Margaret Malandruccolo	
"If You Want Fire"	2009	not available	
"A Million Ways to Run"	2010	Warren P. Sonoda	
"Northern Girl"	2011	Joel Stewart	
"The One"	2011	Ivan Otis	
"Wrecking Ball"	2012	not available	
"I'm Movin' On" (featuring Dean Brody)	2013	not available	
"Some Songs"	2014	Margaret Malandruccolo	
"Longer"	2014	Roman White	
"You Make It Hard" (with Hot Country Knights)	2020	not available	
