= Terri Clark Live: Road Rage =

Live album by Terri Clark
- Released: July 8, 2009
- Genre: Country
- Length: 58:52
- Label: BareTrack
- Producer: Terri Clark

Terri Clark chronology
My Next Life (2007)	Terri Clark Live: Road Rage (2009)	The Long Way Home (2009)

Terri Clark Live: Road Rage is the first live album, eleventh overall, by Canadian country music singer Terri Clark. The album was made available digitally, at Clark's concerts, and through her website on July 8, 2009 via BareTrack Records, a label owned by Clark. The album includes live renditions of fourteen of Clark's singles, four of which are performed as medley, and covers of the Otis Redding song "Hard to Handle" and the Bonnie Raitt song "Love Me Like a Man".

== Track listing ==
1. "In My Next Life" (Terri Clark, Jim Collins, Tom Shapiro) - 5:13
2. "You're Easy on the Eyes" (Clark, Shapiro, Chris Waters) - 3:25
3. "Better Things to Do" (Clark, Shapiro, Waters) - 3:55
4. Medley: "Emotional Girl"/"If I Were You"/"A Little Gasoline"/"When Boy Meets Girl" ("Emotional Girl" by Clark, Waters, Rick Bowles; "If I Were You" by Clark; "A Little Gasoline" by Dean Miller, Tammy Rogers; "When Boy Meets Girl" by Clark, Shapiro, Waters) - 7:29
5. "No Fear" (Mary Chapin Carpenter, Clark) - 5:22
6. "Dirty Girl" (Shapiro, Rivers Rutherford) - 3:22
7. "Now That I Found You" (J.D. Martin, Paul Begaud, Vanessa Corish) - 6:22
8. "Love Me Like a Man" (Chris Smither) - 6:11
9. "I Just Wanna Be Mad" (Kelley Lovelace, Lee Thomas Miller) - 3:46
10. "Poor Poor Pitiful Me" (Warren Zevon) - 3:14
11. "Girls Lie Too" (Connie Harrington, Lovelace, Tom Nichols) - 5:42
12. "I Wanna Do It All" (Rick Giles, Gilles Godard, Nichols) - 3:04
13. "Hard to Handle" (Allen Jones, Al Bell, Otis Redding) - 3:47
