= Greatest Hits 1994–2004 (Terri Clark album) =

Greatest hits album by Terri Clark
- Released: July 27, 2004
- Genre: Country
- Length: 47:50
- Label: Mercury
- Producer: Byron Gallimore; Steuart Smith; Keith Stegall; Chris Waters

Terri Clark chronology
Pain to Kill (2003)	Greatest Hits 1994–2004 (2004)	Life Goes On (2005)

Singles from Greatest Hits 1994–2004
- 1. "Girls Lie Too" Released: April 19, 2004

Professional ratings
Review scores
Source	Rating
Allmusic	link
Robert Christgau	(2-star Honorable Mention)

Greatest Hits 1994–2004 is the first greatest hits album by Canadian country music artist Terri Clark. It was released on July 27, 2004 by Mercury Nashville Records. The album contains eleven of Clark's country hits, including her number one hit "You're Easy on the Eyes". In addition, two new songs were recorded specifically for the compilation, "Girls Lie Too" and "One of the Guys". Clark also included a live version of her single "No Fear" from 2001.

"Girls Lie Too" was the sole single from the record and topped the US Hot Country Songs chart for one week. The compilation debuted at number 14 on the Billboard 200 and the Top Country Albums chart at number four. By December 2004, the RIAA certified the album Gold for shipments of 500,000 copies, becoming her fifth certified album.

== Commercial performance ==
Greatest Hits 1994–2004 debuted at number four on the US Top Country Albums with first-week sales of 62,000 copies, the highest debut of the week. The album also debuted at number 14 on the Billboard 200. Greatest Hits 1994–2004 would go on to spend 80 weeks on the former chart and 34 weeks on the latter.

== Track listing ==
No.	Title	Writer(s)	Original album	Length
1.	"Better Things to Do"	Terri Clark; Tom Shapiro; Chris Waters	Terri Clark	3:08
2.	"When Boy Meets Girl"	Clark; Shapiro; Waters	Terri Clark	3:02
3.	"If I Were You"	Clark	Terri Clark	3:56
4.	"Poor Poor Pitiful Me"	Warren Zevon	Just the Same	3:10
5.	"Emotional Girl"	Rick Bowles; Clark; Waters	Just the Same	3:09
6.	"Now That I Found You"	J. D. Martin; Paul Begaud; Vanessa Corish	How I Feel	3:39
7.	"You're Easy on the Eyes"	Clark; Shapiro; Waters	How I Feel	3:33
8.	"Everytime I Cry"	Bob Regan; Karen Staley	How I Feel	3:48
9.	"A Little Gasoline"	Dean Miller; Tammy Rogers	Fearless	3:09
10.	"I Just Wanna Be Mad"	Kelley Lovelace; Lee Thomas Miller	Pain to Kill	3:26
11.	"I Wanna Do It All"	Rick Giles; Gilles Godard; Tim Nichols	Pain to Kill	2:54
12.	"Girls Lie Too"	Connie Harrington; Lovelace; Nichols	Previously unreleased	3:35
13.	"One of the Guys"	Clark; Godard; Nichols	Previously unreleased	3:13
14.	"No Fear" (Live (2003/Duluth, GA))	Mary Chapin Carpenter; Clark	Previously unreleased	4:08

== Personnel on tracks 12 and 13 ==
- Mike Brignardello – bass guitar
- Terri Clark – lead vocals, background vocals
- Stuart Duncan – fiddle
- Paul Franklin – steel guitar
- Sonny Garrish – steel guitar
- Wes Hightower – background vocals
- B. James Lowry – acoustic guitar
- Brent Mason – electric guitar
- Steve Nathan – keyboards
- Gary Prim – piano
- Lonnie Wilson – drums
- Glenn Worf – bass guitar

== Charts ==
=== Weekly charts ===
Chart (2004)	Peak position
US Billboard 200	14
US Top Country Albums (Billboard)	4

=== Year-end charts ===
Chart (2004)	Position
US Top Country Albums (Billboard)	42
Chart (2005)	Position
US Top Country Albums (Billboard)	47
