= Terri Clark: Take Two =

2024 collaborative album by Terri Clark

Studio album by Terri Clark
- Released: May 31, 2024
- Genre: Country
- Length: 28:34
- Labels: TLC; Mercury Nashville; UMe
- Producer: Terri Clark

Terri Clark chronology
It’s Christmas…Cheers! (2020)	Terri Clark: Take Two (2024)	Terri Clark: Live From The Ryman (2026)

Terri Clark: Take Two is the thirteenth studio album by Canadian country music artist Terri Clark. It was released on May 31, 2024, via Clark's TLC Enterprises in conjunction with Mercury Nashville and Universal Music Enterprises. The album features eight of Clark's previous hits that are re-recorded as duets with other artists. The original version of each song on the album had previously reached the top ten of the country radio charts in both Canada and the United States.

== Background ==
Clark remarked that she had a "wish list" of artists that she sought to work with for the album, and that "maybe only two" had scheduling conflicts that prevented them from joining her on the album. Clark stated that Kelly Clarkson agreed to join her on "If I Were You" after an accidental text message conversation between the two that began with neither woman being sure whom they were speaking to.

"You're Easy on the Eyes" was recorded live with fellow Canadian artist Paul Brandt while Brandt and Clark were performing on their 2023 co-headlining "Homecoming Tour" across Canada. Clark's mother had saved merchandise from her tours, and Clark gifted some shirts to the artists who took part in the album. Take Two was released to digital and streaming platforms on the same day that Clark re-released her Greatest Hits 1994-2004 album on vinyl for the first time.

== Critical reception ==
Katie Armstrong of Cowgirl described Take Two as "a must-listen for fans and newcomers alike" that "stands as a testament to the enduring power of [Clark's] music and the collaborative spirit of the country music community".

== Track listing ==
Terri Clark: Take Two
No.	Title	Writer(s)	Length
1.	"I Just Wanna Be Mad" (featuring Cody Johnson)	Kelley Lovelace; Lee Thomas Miller	3:38
2.	"Poor, Poor Pitiful Me" (featuring Lainey Wilson)	Warren Zevon	3:15
3.	"Better Things to Do" (featuring Ashley McBryde)	Terri Clark; Tom Shapiro; Chris Waters	3:41
4.	"Now That I Found You" (featuring Ben Rector)	J. D. Martin; Paul Begaud; Vanessa Corish	3:30
5.	"I Wanna Do It All" (featuring Lauren Alaina)	Rick Giles; Gilles Godard; Tim Nichols	2:56
6.	"If I Were You" (featuring Kelly Clarkson)	Clark	3:47
7.	"Girls Lie Too" (featuring Carly Pearce)	Lovelace; Nichols; Connie Harrington	3:38
8.	"You're Easy on the Eyes - Live" (featuring Paul Brandt)	Clark; Shapiro; Waters	4:05
Total length:			28:34

== Personnel ==
Adapted from AllMusic.

- Lauren Alaina – featured vocals (5)
- Chris Ashburn – assistant engineering
- Paul Brandt – acoustic guitar, featured vocals (8)
- Mike Brignardello – bass guitar
- Aaron Chmielewski – mixing, recording
- Terri Clark – acoustic guitar, primary vocals, production
- Kelly Clarkson – featured vocals (6)
- Smith Curry – dobro, steel guitar, lap steel guitar
- Jenee Fleenor – fiddle
- Jason Halbert – vocal production
- Evan Hutchings – bells, drums
- Cody Johnson – featured vocals (1)
- B. James Lowry – acoustic guitar
- Josh Macintosh – mixing, recording
- Ashley McBryde – featured vocals (3)
- Pat McGrath – acoustic guitar
- Travis McNabb – drums, percussion
- Sam Moses – mastering engineer
- Billy Nobel – Hammond B3, keyboards, piano
- Carly Pearce – featured vocals (7)
- Ben Rector – featured vocals (4)
- Adam Shoenfeld – acoustic guitar, banjo, electric guitar
- Jimmie Lee Sloas – bass guitar
- Lainey Wilson – featured vocals (2)

== Release history ==
Release formats for Terri Clark: Take Two
Country	Date	Format	Label	Ref.
Various	May 31, 2024	Digital download	TLC / UMe	
Various	May 31, 2024	Streaming	TLC / UMe	
