= The Definitive Collection =

(The) Definitive Collection may refer to:

- The Definitive Collection (ABBA album), 2001
- The Definitive Collection (Australian Crawl & James Reyne album), 2002
- The Definitive Collection (A Life in Music), an album by Cilla Black, 2009
- The Definitive Collection (Cameo album), 2006
- The Definitive Collection (Eric Carmen album), 1997
- The Definitive Collection (Eliza Carthy album), 2003
- Definitive Collection (Tony Christie album), 2005
- The Definitive Collection (Terri Clark album)
- The Definitive Collection (Patsy Cline album)
- The Definitive Collection (Billy Ray Cyrus album), 2004
- The Definitive Collection (Deadstar album)
- The Definitive Collection (DeBarge album)
- The Definitive Collection, the 2007 reissue of His Best by Bo Diddley
- Definitive Collection (Donovan album), 1995
- Definitive Collection (Electric Light Orchestra album)
- Definitive Collection (Europe album), 1997
- The Definitive Collection (Foreigner album), 2006
- Definitive Collection (Nina Hagen album), 1995
- The Definitive Collection (Cissy Houston album), 2000
- The Definitive Collection, the 2007 reissue of His Best by Howlin' Wolf
- The Definitive Collection (Humble Pie album), 2006
- The Definitive Collection (Michael Jackson album)
- The Definitive Collection (Kitarō album)
- The Definitive Collection (Level 42 album), 2006
- The Definitive Collection (Little River Band album)
- The Definitive Collection (Jeff Lorber album), 2000
- The Definitive Collection (Olivia Newton-John album), 2001
- The Definitive Collection (Alan Parsons album), 1997
- The Definitive Collection (Partridge Family album), 2001
- The Definitive Collection (Sandi Patty album)
- The Definitive Collection (Elvis Presley album)
- The Definitive Collection (Lou Reed album), 1999
- The Definitive Collection (Lionel Richie album)
- The Definitive Collection (Archie Roach album), 2004
- The Definitive Collection (Diana Ross album), 2006
- The Definitive Collection (Santana album)
- The Definitive Collection, an album by Neil Sedaka
- The Definitive Collection (The Sports album), 2004
- The Definitive Collection (The Supremes album), 2008
- The Definitive Collection (Rachid Taha album)
- The Definitive Collection, an album by The Temptations, 2008
- The Definitive Collection (Thin Lizzy album), 2006
- The Definitive Collection (Ernest Tubb album), 2006
- The Definitive Collection (Bonnie Tyler album)
- The Definitive Collection (Whitesnake album)
- The Definitive Collection (Edgar Winter album), 2016
- The Definitive Collection (Stevie Wonder album) 2002
- Led Zeppelin Definitive Collection, 2008
- Step Back in Time: The Definitive Collection, an album by Kylie Minogue, 2019

== See also ==
- The Ultimate Collection (disambiguation)
