= My Next Life =

My Next Life may refer to:

- My Next Life (album), unreleased 2007 album by Terri Clark
- "My Next Life", episode 257 of Grey's Anatomy season 12

== See also ==
- "In My Next Life", 2007 single by Terri Clark
- My Next Life as a Villainess: All Routes Lead to Doom!, a Japanese light novel
