= Life Goes On (Terri Clark album) =

Studio album by Terri Clark
- Released: November 1, 2005
- Genre: Country
- Length: 44:20
- Label: Mercury Nashville
- Producer: Byron Gallimore (tracks 2,4,6-12); James Stroud (tracks 1,3,5)

Terri Clark chronology
Greatest Hits 1994-2004 (2004)	Life Goes On (2005)	My Next Life (2007)

Singles from Pain to Kill
- 1. "She Didn't Have Time" Released: July 18, 2005; 2. "Damn Right" Released: February 6, 2006; 3. "Slow News Day" Released: May 2006 (Canada only)

Professional ratings
Review scores
Source	Rating
Allmusic	4/5 stars

Life Goes On is the sixth studio album by Canadian country music singer Terri Clark. It was released on November 1, 2005 by Mercury Nashville. The album was originally supposed to be titled Honky Tonk Songs and was scheduled for an April 2005 release, with its lead being "The World Needs a Drink". The album was later delayed, with the supposed lead single being scrapped from Life Goes On. The album was Clark's final release for Mercury Records after the album underperformed expectations.

Receiving mostly favorable reviews, Life Goes On became Clark's last top ten album on the Top Country Albums chart and final entry on the Billboard 200. The album spawned three singles, only one of which ("She Didn't Have Time") entered the Hot Country Songs chart. Two other singles were released, "Damn Right" and "Slow News Day", with the former failing to enter any charts and the latter becoming a top-twenty Canadian country hit.

== Original track list ==
Before it was delayed, Honky Tonk Songs had a near similar track list:

1. Honky Tonk Song
2. I Wish He'd Been Drinkin' Whiskey
3. Damn Right (I'm Gonna Miss You)
4. The World Needs a Drink
5. Cowboy Days
6. Travelin' Soul
7. Bigger Windows
8. Everybody's Gotta Go Sometime
9. You Gotta Love That
10. Slow News Day
11. Tear It All Down
12. Last Good Time

"Last Good Time" and "The World Needs a Drink" were both scrapped from the record, with "She Didn't Have Time" and "Not Enough Tequila" replacing the songs.

== Singles ==
When the album was originally titled Honky Tonk Songs, the song "The World Needs a Drink" (credited on its chart run as "I Think The World Needs a Drink") was released on October 4, 2004 to country radio. The song was released quickly after Clark's previous single "Girls Lie Too" from her greatest hits album went number one on the Hot Country Songs chart (then known as "Hot Country Singles & Tracks"). The song debuted on the Hot Country Songs chart the week of November 20, 2004 at number 44, the "Hot Shot Debut" of the week. The song later rose to a peak of number 26 on February 19, 2005, spending two weeks at the spot; the song spent 19 weeks in total.

"She Didn't Have Time" would be serviced as the official lead single from the album on July 18, 2005. It also would debut at number 44, tying "The World Needs a Drink". It would peak at number 25 on the Hot Country Songs chart while also peaking at number 15 on the Radio & Records Canada Country and Bubbling Under Hot 100. "Damn Right" would be serviced on February 6, 2006 as the second single. It failed to enter Hot Country Songs, although it did briefly chart on the Radio & Records Country Indicator chart at number 47. The third and final single, "Slow News Day" was commissioned only to Canadian country radio in May 2006; it would also be Clark's final single for the label before leaving in mid-2006. It debuted at number 28 on May 12, 2006. It would go on to peak at number 12, becoming the highest peaking single from the album.

== Track listing ==
No.	Title	Writer(s)	Length
1.	"Life Goes On"	Bob DiPiero, Karyn Rochelle	2:59
2.	"Damn Right"	Julian Gallagher, Craig Wiseman	4:04
3.	"She Didn't Have Time"	Pat Bunch, Nicole Witt	3:22
4.	"Cowboy Days"	Kent Blazy, Leslie Satcher	3:32
5.	"Not Enough Tequila"	Jim "Moose" Brown, Erin Enderlin	3:22
6.	"Bigger Windows"	Connie Harrington, Kelley Lovelace, Tim Nichols	3:48
7.	"I Wish He'd Been Drinkin' Whiskey"	DiPiero, Rochelle	4:21
8.	"Honky Tonk Song"	Blazy, Satcher	3:51
9.	"Travelin' Soul"	Lisa Brokop, Mark Narmore, Liz Rose	4:10
10.	"Everybody's Gotta Go Sometime"	Terri Clark, Gilles Godard, Bobby Tomberlin	3:45
11.	"Slow News Day"	Clark	4:10
12.	"Tear It All Down"	Clark, Lisa Scott, Stephony Smith	2:56

== Personnel ==
- Mike Brignardello – bass guitar
- Tom Bukovac – electric guitar
- Terri Clark – lead vocals, background vocals
- Lisa Cochran – background vocals
- Dan Dugmore – steel guitar
- Stuart Duncan – fiddle, mandolin
- Paul Franklin – dobro, steel guitar, lap steel guitar
- Byron Gallimore – electric guitar, organ
- Sonny Garrish – steel guitar
- Aubrey Haynie – fiddle
- Wes Hightower – background vocals
- B. James Lowry – acoustic guitar
- Liana Manis – background vocals
- Brent Mason – electric guitar
- Steve Nathan – keyboards, organ, piano
- Leslie Satcher – background vocals
- Russell Terrell – background vocals
- Cindy Richardson-Walker – background vocals
- John Willis – acoustic guitar
- Lonnie Wilson – drums, percussion
- Glenn Worf – bass guitar

== Charts ==
Chart (2005)	Peak position
U.S. Billboard 200	26
U.S. Billboard Top Country Albums	4

=== Singles ===
Chart performances of singles from Life Goes On
Year	Single	Peak chart positions		
Year	Single	US Country	US	CAN Country
2005	"She Didn't Have Time"	25	115	15
2006	"Damn Right"	–	–	–
2006	"Slow News Day"	–	–	12
