= Northern Girl =

Northern Girl or Northern Girls may refer to:

- Northern Girls (北妹, Bei Mei), prize-winning novel by Sheng Keyi
- Northern Girl (Prime Minister song)
- "Northern Girl" (song), a song by Terri Clark
