= Three Mississippi =

Single by Terri Clark

from the album Pain to Kill
- B-side: "I Just Wanna Be Mad"
- Released: March 10, 2003
- Recorded: 2002
- Genre: Country
- Length: 3:59
- Label: Mercury Nashville
- Songwriter(s): Angelo Petraglia; Hillary Lindsey; Troy Verges
- Producer(s): Byron Gallimore

Terri Clark singles chronology
"I Just Wanna Be Mad" (2002)	"Three Mississippi" (2003)	"I Wanna Do It All" (2003)

"Three Mississippi" is a song recorded by Canadian country music artist Terri Clark. The song was written by Angelo Petraglia, Hillary Lindsey, and Troy Verges and produced by Byron Gallimore. It was released on March 10, 2003, as the second single from Clark's fifth studio album Pain to Kill (2003). It was initially planned to be the lead single from the album.

The song peaked at number 30 on the US Hot Country Songs chart.

== Background ==
"Three Mississippi" was pushed by Clark's label at the time, Mercury Nashville, to be the lead single from Pain to Kill. Clark and her team however pushed for "I Just Wanna Be Mad" to be released instead. During the recording of "Three Mississippi", Clark wanted to record it due to it showcasing more of her vocal range. She told producer Byron Gallimore she wanted to record the single and they both recorded it, with the feeling it would become a hit. Clark said in an interview that there was another song with the same title in Nashville, but had no similarity to her version.

== Music video ==
A music video for the song debuted on CMT's playlists during the week of April 20, 2003.

== Chart performance ==
"Three Mississippi" debuted on the US Billboard Hot Country Songs chart the week of March 22, 2003 at number 57. The song reached its peak position of number 30 on June 28, 2003, where it stayed for one week. "Three Mississippi" overall spent 18 weeks on the chart.

== Charts ==
Chart (2003)	Peak position
US Hot Country Songs (Billboard)	30

== Release history ==
Release dates and format(s) for "Three Mississippi"
Region	Date	Format(s)	Label(s)	Ref.
United States	March 10, 2003	Country radio	Mercury Nashville	
