= I'm Moving On (Hank Snow song) =

Country standard written by Hank Snow

Single by Hank Snow (The Singing Ranger) and His Rainbow Ranch Boys
- A-side: "With This Ring, I Thee Wed"
- Released: May 5, 1950
- Recorded: March 28, 1950
- Studio: Brown Radio Productions, Nashville, Tennessee
- Genre: Country; honky-tonk
- Label: RCA Victor
- Songwriter: Clarence E. Snow a.k.a. Hank Snow
- Producer: Stephen Sholes

Hank Snow (The Singing Ranger) and His Rainbow Ranch Boys singles chronology
"The Drunkard's Son" (1950)	"I'm Moving On" (1950)	"I Cried But My Tears Were Too Late" (1950)

"I'm Moving On" is a 1950 country standard written by Hank Snow. It was a success in the record charts and has been recorded by numerous musicians in a variety of styles.

== Recording and lyrics ==
According to Snow, he proposed the song for his first session for RCA Records in 1949, but recording director Stephen H. Sholes turned it down. "Later on, in the spring of 1950, in Nashville, Mr. Sholes had not remembered the song, so I recorded it," Snow recalled.

The song has four bars of verse followed by eight bars of chorus with the final lines referring back to the verse:

That big eight-wheeler rollin' down the track
Means your true-lovin' daddy ain't comin' back
'Cause I'm movin' on, I'll soon be gone
You were flyin' too high for my little old sky so I'm movin' on

== Charts and critical reception ==
The single reached number one on the Billboard country singles chart and stayed there for 21 weeks, tying a record for the most weeks atop the chart. It was the first of seven number-one Billboard country hits Snow scored throughout his career on that chart. The song's success led to Snow joining the Grand Ole Opry cast in 1950.

According to music writer John Morthland, "The chugging beat establishes that this is a train song, and the fiddle and steel push harder than is usual on Nashville records from this era ... There's real anger and determination in Snow's voice, which sometimes sounds too smooth for this type of song."

== Charting versions ==
- Ray Charles – In 1959, his version reached number forty on the Billboard Hot 100 singles chart and number eleven on the R&B singles chart. Charles's version with his soul band featured congas and maracas, giving the Spanish tinge to a country and western blues. It was recorded on June 26, 1959, at his last recording session with Atlantic Records, months before he signed with ABC. Produced by Jerry Wexler, Charles provides the lead vocals, and is backed by the Raelettes. The Ray Charles Orchestra provided the instrumentation.
- Don Gibson – reached No. 14 on the Billboard Hot Country Singles chart with a recording of the song in 1960.
- Matt Lucas – In June 1963, his Smash Records single reached No. 56 on the Hot 100.
- The Rolling Stones recorded the song for their EP Got Live If You Want It! in 1965. Their version charted in Sweden, reaching No. 3 on Tio i Topp and No. 7 on Kvällstoppen.
- Emmylou Harris – Released an up-tempo live version on her album Last Date in 1982, which reached No. 5 on the Hot Country Singles chart.
- Terri Clark recorded the song with Dean Brody, for Clark's 2012 album Classic. Their version reached no. 28 on the Canada Country airplay chart.

== Other recordings ==
- Les Paul and Mary Ford – Les and Mary (1955)
- Al Hirt - Honey in the Horn (1963)
- Elvis Presley recorded and released a version in 1969, which was included on his album From Elvis in Memphis
- Country singer Johnny Cash recorded a duet version of the song with Waylon Jennings in 1984 that was eventually released on the posthumous album Out Among the Stars in 2014.
- Former Steppenwolf lead singer John Kay recorded a version on his first solo album, Forgotten Songs and Unsung Heroes in 1972.
- Canadian blues musician Dutch Mason included a cover of the tune on his 1980 album Special Brew.
- George Thorogood and The Destroyers also covered the song on their 1988 album Born To Be Bad.
