= A Million Ways to Run =

Single by Terri Clark

from the album The Long Way Home
- Released: January 2010
- Genre: Country
- Length: 4:19
- Label: BareTrack; Capitol Nashville; EMI Canada
- Songwriter(s): Terri Clark
- Producer(s): Terri Clark

Terri Clark singles chronology
"If You Want Fire" (2009)	"A Million Ways to Run" (2010)	"You Tell Me" (2010)

Music video
- "A Million Ways to Run" at CMT.com

"A Million Ways to Run" is a song written and recorded by Canadian country artist Terri Clark. It was released in January 2010 as the third single from her seventh studio album, The Long Way Home.

== Content ==
"A Million Ways to Run" is a country ballad, backed primarily by acoustic guitar and mandolin. The song's female narrator, someone struggling with how to properly deal with her feelings, describes an event where she witnessed another woman confessing similar sins in a church basement (AA Meeting). The woman's words resonated with the narrator, and even though there were "a million ways to run," she chose to turn her life around.

Terri Clark wrote the song while on vacation in Hawaii, describing it as "the most personal song [she'd] ever written." Of the song, she said "it's about reaching a point in your life when you realize that what you've been doing, and how you've been dealing ( or not dealing) with uncomfortable emotions, feelings, and thoughts, isn't working anymore."

== Music video ==
The music video, which was directed by Warren P. Sonoda, began shooting in late January 2010 and premiered on Terri Clark's website on March 16, 2010 and a week later on CMT. In the video, a young woman with a drinking problem, walks into a church where a group of troubled people are sitting in a circle, sharing their stories in order to seek help. Flashbacks of the woman passing out after heavy drinking, as well as scenes of others contemplating suicide and injecting drugs are included. In the end, the woman feels relieved from sharing her life's struggle, which she turned around one night by tossing her alcohol bottle into a sidewalk planter, and everyone in the room begins to smile. Throughout the video, Terri Clark is shown performing with her acoustic guitar outside the church, in a busy downtown at night, and sitting behind the group of people in the church.

== Charts ==
Chart (2010)	Peak position
Canada Country (Billboard)	16
