= Falling in Love with Love =

Song
- Published: 1938
- Composer: Richard Rodgers
- Lyricist: Lorenz Hart

"Falling in Love with Love" is a show tune from the Rodgers and Hart musical The Boys from Syracuse, where it was introduced by Muriel Angelus. The musical premiered on Broadway in 1938. The song is set to a waltz, but the lyrics "remind his [Hart's] listeners of the show's skeptical tone".

== Notable recordings ==
- Cannonball Adderley – Julian Cannonball Adderley and Strings (1955)
- Helen Merrill – Helen Merrill (1955)
- Les Paul and Mary Ford – Les and Mary (1955)
- Clifford Brown – Memorial (1956)
- Jimmy Smith – A Date with Jimmy Smith Volume One (1957)
- Julie Andrews – Julie Andrews Sings (1958)
- Wes Montgomery – Far Wes (1958)
- Dinah Shore – Dinah, Yes Indeed! (1959)
- Carmen McRae - Something to Swing About (1960)
- Vic Damone – On the Swingin' Side (1960)
- Anita O'Day – Anita O'Day and Billy May Swing Rodgers and Hart (1960)
- Alma Cogan – With You in Mind (1961)
- Frank Sinatra – Sinatra Swings (1961)
- Caterina Valente – Super-Fonics (1961)
- Sammy Davis Jr. – Sammy Davis Jr. Belts the Best of Broadway (1962)
- Ahmad Jamal – Ahmad Jamal at the Blackhawk (1962)
- Cliff Richard – 32 Minutes and 17 Seconds with Cliff Richard (1962)
- Sheila Jordan – Portrait of Sheila (1963)
- Sarah Vaughan – The Explosive Side of Sarah Vaughan (1963)
- Andy Williams – Days of Wine and Roses and Other TV Requests (1963)
- Sergio Franchi – The Songs of Richard Rodgers (1965)
- Franco Cerri – 12 bacchette per una chitarra – Orchestrated by Ennio Morricone (1966)
- The Supremes – The Supremes Sing Rodgers & Hart (1967)
- Peggy March – No Foolin' (1968)
- Patricia Routledge – Presenting Patricia Routledge (1973)
- Eliane Elias – Illusions (1987)
- Frederica von Stade - My Funny Valentine (1989)
- Jessye Norman – Lucky to Be Me (1992)
- Roseanna Vitro – Softly (1993)

== Other performances ==
- In the 1940 musical film version of The Boys from Syracuse, it was performed by Allan Jones.
- It was sung by Bernadette Peters as the Stepmother in the 1997 television film version of Rodgers and Hammerstein's Cinderella.
