= Northern Girl (song) =

Single by Terri Clark

from the album Roots and Wings
- Released: April 11, 2011
- Genre: Country
- Length: 3:49
- Label: BareTrack; EMI Canada
- Songwriter(s): Terri Clark; Kristen Hall
- Producer(s): Terri Clark

Terri Clark singles chronology
"You Tell Me" (2010)	"Northern Girl" (2011)	"We're Here for a Good Time" (2011)

Music video

"Northern Girl" is a song recorded and produced by Canadian country music artist Terri Clark. It was released on April 11, 2011, as the lead single from her eighth studio album Roots and Wings (2011). The song was written by Clark and former Sugarland member Kristen Hall. The song became a success in her native Canada, peaking at number eight on the Canada Country chart.

== Content ==
The song describes Clark's early life growing up in Medicine Hat, Canada and how, no matter where she goes in the world, she will always be a "northern girl". Discussing the sound of the single, Clark described it as "more mainstream, country pop sounding" compared to the rest of Roots and Wings.

== Charts ==
Chart (2011)	Peak position
Canada Country (Billboard)	8
