= Les and Mary =

Studio album by Les Paul and Mary Ford
- Released: 1955
- Label: Capitol

Professional ratings
Review scores
Source	Rating
Allmusic	4/5 stars

Les and Mary is a studio album released by Les Paul and Mary Ford in 1955 on Capitol Records. The album was available in multiple formats, including a single 12-inch LP (W-577), as a 10-inch double-album (H-1-2-577), and with two separate options as a 45 rpm EP set, one with 2 tracks per side, the other with four tracks per side. Additionally, the album was released in true album format as 78 rpm.

The album features ten vocals by Mary Ford. The balance of the album (six tracks) are instrumentals by Les Paul The songs contained in the album are noted for their diversity.

The album reached as high as #15 on the Billboard album charts, staying on the charts for 6 weeks at a time when very few album chart positions were tracked.

== Track listing ==
1. Falling in Love with Love (Richard Rodgers - Lorenz Hart) 2:09
2. On the Sunny Side of the Street (Jimmy McHugh - Dorothy Fields) 2:36
3. Just One of Those Things (Cole Porter) 2:20
4. Twelfth Street Rag (Euday L. Bowman) 2:21
5. Lies (Harry Barris - George E. Springer) 2:35
6. Turista (Geraldo Blota - Angelo Apolonia) 2:26
7. Swing Low, Sweet Chariot (traditional) 2:17
8. Nueva Laredo (Jimmy Hicks - Marvin Moore) 2:58
9. The Best Things in Life Are Free (Brown - DeSylva - Henderson) 2:29
10. Moritat (From Three Penny Opera) (Bertolt Brecht - Kurt Weill) 2:26
11. Some of These Days (Shelton Brooks) 2:09
12. Tico, Tico (Zequinha de Abreu) 1:37
13. Baby, Won't You Please Come Home (Charles Warfield - Clarence Williams) 2:03
14. Dangerous Curves (Machin) 2:30
15. I'm Movin' On (Hank Snow) 1:49
16. Farewell (For Just Awhile) (Brooks - Lund) 2:24
