= My Next Life (album) =

Studio album (unreleased) by Terri Clark
- Genre: Country
- Label: BNA Records
- Producer: Garth Fundis

Singles from My Next Life
- 1. "Dirty Girl" Released: April 24, 2007; 2. "In My Next Life" Released: November 27, 2007

My Next Life was a planned studio album by Canadian country music artist Terri Clark, intended to be released in August 2007 through BNA Records. The ultimately shelved project was produced by Garth Fundis.

Two singles were released from the recording sessions, with "Dirty Girl" and "In My Next Life" charting in Canada and the US. Clark left BNA in November 2008 to become an independent artist and focus on the Canadian market. She re-recorded some of the songs for her next album, The Long Way Home (2009).

== Background ==
In March 2006, Terri Clark announced on her website that she departed ways with Mercury Nashville, the label that she had been with since her album Terri Clark was released in 1995. By June of that same year, it was announced that Clark had signed a record deal with BNA Records, a record label known for housing acts such as Kenny Chesney and Lonestar. In this same press interview, it was also announced her first album with the label would be released in 2007. Clark worked with producer Garth Fundis.

The project included a song titled "Nashville Girls", which featured country music artists Martina McBride, Sara Evans, and Reba McEntire.

== Singles ==
"Dirty Girl" was released as the lead single from the scrapped album on April 2, 2007, to country radio before receiving a digital release on April 24. The song was written by Tom Shapiro and Rivers Rutherford and was originally meant to be offered to a male artist, but Clark helped re-write the song to give it a woman's perspective. It debuted on the US Billboard Hot Country Songs chart the week of March 24, 2007, at number 51. It reached a peak position of number 30 for the week of June 2, 2007, staying there for two non-consecutive weeks. It spent 19 total weeks on the chart. It peaked at number 13 on the Canada Country chart as well as number 68 on the Canadian Hot 100.

The title track "In My Next Life" premiered on November 27, 2007, as the second single from the album. It debuted on the US Hot Country Songs chart the week of December 1, 2007, at number 60 and rose to a peak position of number 36 on February 16, 2008, where it stayed for one week. It spent 17 weeks in total. It topped the Canada Country chart for one week on February 23, 2008. It peaked at number 66 on the Canadian Hot 100.

== Cancellation and departure from BNA ==
My Next Life was planned to have a July 24, 2007, release date, but this was pushed back several times. Billboard magazine published an estimated release date of August 7, 2007. A spokesperson later announced that Clark's album would be delayed to early 2008.

In November 2008, it was announced that Clark left BNA Records to become independent, abandoning the album project. To members of her fan club, she wrote that there were creative differences between her and BNA, and that she wanted to focus more on the Canadian market.

== Track listing ==
All songs were produced by Garth Fundis. The songs "Tough With Me" and "Gypsy Boots" were later re-recorded and included on Clark's album The Long Way Home (2009), with these versions being produced by Clark alone.

No.	Title	Writer(s)	Length
1.	"In My Next Life"	Terri Clark; Jim Collins; Tom Shapiro	4:10
2.	"Look What You've Done to Me"
3.	"Tough With Me"	Clark; Shapiro; Collins	3:34
4.	"Never Say No"
5.	"Dirty Girl"	Shapiro; Rivers Rutherford	3:02
6.	"Nashville Girls" (with Sara Evans, Martina McBride, and Reba McEntire)
7.	"Gypsy Boots"	Clark; Jon Randall; Leslie Satcher	3:51
8.	"The Only Time You Call"
9.	"Happy Yet?"
10.	"Tumblin' Down"
11.	"Live from America"
