= The Definitive Collection (Jeff Lorber album) =

Compilation album by Jeff Lorber
- Released: February 22, 2000
- Genre: Smooth jazz Fusion
- Length: 71:44
- Label: Arista
- Producer: Chris Brunt, David Frank, Jeff Lorber, Marlon McClain, Mic Murphy, Rik Pekkonen

Jeff Lorber chronology
Midnight (1998)	The Definitive Collection (2000)	Kickin' It (2001)

Professional ratings
Review scores
Source	Rating
Allmusic	4/5 stars

The Definitive Collection is a compilation album of jazz fusion songs by American pianist Jeff Lorber and was released in 2000 through Arista Records.

This album sampler includes tracks from albums released in 1977–1985 during Jeff Lorber's years with "The Jeff Lorber Fusion" group through 1981 and the beginning of his solo career in 1982. Songs such as "Tune 88" and "Toad's Place" were featured on The Weather Channel's Local On The 8s segments.

== Track listing ==
1. "Tune 88"
2. "Water Sign"
3. "Night Love"
4. "Fusion Juice"
5. "Warm Springs"
6. "Rain Dance"
7. "Wizard Island"
8. "Spur Of The Moment"
9. "Tierra Verde"
10. "Toad's Place"
11. "Magic Lady"
12. "The Magician"
13. "Tropical"
14. "City"
15. "Waterfall"
16. "Step By Step"
