= She Didn't Have Time =

Single by Terri Clark

from the album Life Goes On
- Released: July 18, 2005
- Genre: Country
- Length: 3:22
- Label: Mercury Nashville
- Songwriters: Pat Bunch; Nicole Witt
- Producer: James Stroud

Terri Clark singles chronology
"The World Needs a Drink" (2004)	"She Didn't Have Time" (2005)	"Damn Right" (2006)

Music video
- "She Didn't Have Time" at CMT.com

"She Didn't Have Time" is a song written by Pat Bunch and Nicole Witt, and recorded by Canadian country music artist Terri Clark. It was released in July 2005 as the lead-off single from her album Life Goes On. The song was Clark's fourteenth Top 20 hit on the Canadian country charts, reaching a peak of number 15.

== Content ==
"She Didn't Have Time" is a mid-tempo country ballad, backed primarily with steel guitar and fiddle. The song describes a narrator's struggles of being left to care for her baby after the man in her life walks out. Later, when the child is older, friends advise her to get out of the house and meet someone new, but "she didn't have time." Then she gets a flat tire and has coffee with the repairman, who happens to love kids, and they fall in love that night.

== Critical reception ==
Kevin John Coyne of Country Universe gave the song a positive review, saying that it was "A fully believable and flawlessly told story about a single mom getting by."

== Music video ==
A music video was released for the song, directed by Trey Fanjoy. In the video, Clark is shown in a room with black-and-white photos hanging down on strings. The photos are of the characters in the story; the video switches between the still pictures and scenes of the woman being left by her husband, taking care of her child, and talking to the repairman.

== Chart performance ==
"She Didn't Have Time" debuted at number 44 on the U.S. Billboard Hot Country Songs chart for the week of August 6, 2005. It reached a peak of number 25 in December 2005.

Chart (2005–2006)	Peak position
Canada Country (Radio & Records)	15
US Hot Country Songs (Billboard)	25
US Bubbling Under Hot 100 (Billboard)	15
