= Roots and Wings (Terri Clark album) =

Studio album by Terri Clark
- Released: July 26, 2011
- Genre: Country
- Length: 38:34
- Labels: BareTrack; Capitol Nashville; EMI Canada
- Producer: Terri Clark

Terri Clark chronology
The Long Way Home (2009)	Roots and Wings (2011)	Classic (2012)

Singles from Roots and Wings
- 1. "Northern Girl" Released: April 11, 2011; 2. "We're Here for a Good Time" Released: July 18, 2011; 3. "The One" Released: October 17, 2011; 4. "Wrecking Ball" Released: April 2, 2012

Professional ratings
Review scores
Source	Rating
Allmusic	4.5/5 stars
Roughstock	4.5/5 stars

Roots and Wings is the eighth studio album by Canadian country music artist Terri Clark. The album was released on July 26, 2011 via BareTrack Records/Capitol Nashville/EMI Canada. The first single released from the album was "Northern Girl." The album's second single, "We're Here for a Good Time," was originally recorded by Canadian rock band Trooper in 1977.

Roots and Wings won Country Album of the Year at the 2012 Juno Awards.

== Track listing ==
No.	Title	Writer(s)	Length
1.	"Wrecking Ball"	Terri Clark, Tia Sillers, Victoria Banks	3:30
2.	"Breakin' Up Thing"	Clark, Kristen Hall	3:55
3.	"The One"	Clark, Tom Shapiro, Jim Collins	3:44
4.	"Northern Girl"	Clark, Hall	3:49
5.	"Beautiful and Broken"	Clark, Hall	4:04
6.	"Lonesome's Last Call"	Clark, Jim Rushing	3:45
7.	"The Good Was Great"	Clark, Sillers, Deric Ruttan	4:27
8.	"Smile" (featuring Alison Krauss)	Clark, Karyn Rochelle	4:16
9.	"We're Here for a Good Time"	Ra McGuire, Brian Smith	2:45
10.	"Flowers in Snow"	Clark, Hall	4:19

Amazon MP3 Bonus Track
No.	Title	Writer(s)	Length
11.	"If You Want Fire" (live)	Clark, Shapiro, Jimmy Ritchey	8:03

== Personnel ==
- Jason Barry – electric guitar
- Terri Clark – choir, lead vocals, background vocals
- John Diamond – bass guitar
- Dan Dugmore – steel guitar
- Stuart Duncan – fiddle
- Jeneé Fleenor – background vocals
- Shannon Forrest – drums
- Kenny Greenberg – electric guitar
- Kristen Hall – choir, background vocals
- Tony Harrell – accordion, piano
- Edie Hartwick – choir
- Wes Hightower – background vocals
- Sonya Isaacs – background vocals
- Jeff Jones – choir
- Alison Krauss – background vocals on "Smile"
- B. James Lowry – acoustic guitar
- Tim Marks – bass guitar
- Brent Mason – electric guitar
- Lyle Molzan – drums
- Jourdan Murr – choir
- Steve Nathan – keyboards
- Russ Pahl – steel guitar
- John Wesley Ryles – background vocals
- Bryan Sutton – banjo, acoustic guitar, mandolin
- Glenn Worf – bass guitar
- Andrea Zonn – fiddle

== Release history ==
Region	Date	Format
Canada	July 26, 2011	CD, digital download
United States	July 26, 2011	Digital download
United States	September 13, 2011	CD

== Chart performance ==
Album

Chart (2011)	Peak position
Canadian Albums Chart	24
U.S. Billboard Top Country Albums	69

Singles

Year	Single	Peak positions
Year	Single	CAN
2011	"Northern Girl"	—
2011	"We're Here for a Good Time"	98
2011	"The One"	—
2012	"Wrecking Ball"	—
"—" denotes releases that did not chart
