= Some Songs =

Studio album by Terri Clark
- Released: September 2, 2014
- Genre: Country
- Label: BareTrack; Universal Music Canada
- Producer: Michael Knox

Terri Clark chronology
Classic (2012)	Some Songs (2014)	Raising the Bar (2018)

Singles from Some Songs
- 1. "Some Songs" Released: May 27, 2014; 2. "Longer" Released: October 2014; 3. "I Cheated on You" Released: April 2015

Some Songs is the tenth studio album by Canadian country music artist Terri Clark. It was released on September 2, 2014, via BareTrack Records/Universal Music Canada. Clark teamed with PledgeMusic for the album.

Some Songs was produced by Michael Knox. Clark co-wrote five of the album's ten tracks.

== Critical reception ==
Dean Gordon-Smith of The Morning Star called the album "a blunt and easy going dose of country rock without frills." He wrote that it "has a mid-range, confident sound and Clark never sounds like she’s pushing herself."

== Track listing ==
No.	Title	Writer(s)	Length
1.	"Here Comes Crazy"	Terri Clark; Marti Lynn Dodson; Tom Shapiro	3:06
2.	"Some Songs"	Tom Douglas; Jaren Johnston; James T. Slater	3:11
3.	"Longer"	T. Clark; Shapiro; Ross Copperman	3:02
4.	"Don't Start"	Dave Barnes; Clare Dunn; Jeremy Spillman	3:25
5.	"I Cheated on You"	Brent Anderson; Brandy Clark; Forest Whitehead	3:15
6.	"Feelin' Pretty Good Right Now"	Brett Beavers; Connie Harrington; Vicky McGehee	3:30
7.	"Just Add Water"	T. Clark; Harrington; Jimmy Yeary	2:48
8.	"Wheels Down"	T. Clark; Shapiro; Jerry Flowers	3:27
9.	"Bad Car"	B. Clark; Jason Saenz	3:00
10.	"Better with My Boots On"	T. Clark; Harrington; Deric Ruttan	3:46

== Chart performance ==
=== Album ===
Chart (2014)	Peak position
Canadian Albums (Billboard)	21

=== Singles ===
Year	Single	Peak positions
Year	Single	CAN Country
2014	"Some Songs"	20
2014	"Longer"	28
2015	"I Cheated on You"	—
"—" denotes releases that did not chart
