= The World Needs a Drink =

Single by Terri Clark
- Released: November 8, 2004
- Genre: Country
- Length: 3:55
- Label: Mercury Nashville
- Songwriters: Eric Church; Casey Beathard
- Producer: Byron Gallimore

Terri Clark singles chronology
"Girls Lie Too" (2004)	"The World Needs a Drink" (2004)	"She Didn't Have Time" (2005)

"The World Needs a Drink" (originally released as "I Think The World Needs a Drink") is a song by Canadian country music artist Terri Clark. The song was written by a then-unknown Eric Church and Casey Beathard and produced by Byron Gallimore. It was released on November 8, 2004, to country radio as a single. It was intended to be the lead single to Clark's planned sixth studio album Honky Tonk Songs, which would be reworked to Life Goes On (2005). The song was not included on the album.

The song peaked at number 26 on the US Hot Country Songs chart and number 24 on the Radio & Records Canada Country Top 30 chart. Although Clark herself has never performed the single live, its co-writer Eric Church has performed the song a few times at his concerts.

== Music video ==
A music video for "The World Needs a Drink" was released, with it being filmed by Thom Oliphant. The video first premiered to Great American Country on January 2, 2005. It would later be released on the more popular CMT on January 23, 2005.

== Commercial performance ==
"The World Needs a Drink" debuted on the US Billboard Hot Country Songs the week of November 20, 2004, at number 44. It peaked at number 26 on February 19, 2005, where it stayed for two weeks; the song spent 19 weeks overall on the chart.

The single debuted on the Radio & Records Canada Country Top 30 the week of January 28, 2005, at number 30 with 218 total plays. The song reached its peak position of number 24 the week of February 18, 2005, where it stayed for two weeks.

== Charts ==
Chart (2004–2005)	Peak position
Canada Country (Radio & Records)	24
US Hot Country Songs (Billboard)	26

=== Year-end charts ===
Chart (2005)	Position
US Country Songs (Billboard)	98

== Release history ==
Release dates and format(s) for "The World Needs a Drink"
Region	Date	Format(s)	Label(s)	Ref.
United States	November 8, 2004	Country radio	Mercury Nashville	
