= Pain to Kill =

Studio album by Terri Clark
- Released: January 14, 2003
- Genre: Country
- Length: 44:40
- Label: Mercury Nashville
- Producer: Byron Gallimore (tracks 1-3,5,6,8); Keith Stegall (tracks 4,7,9-12)

Terri Clark chronology
Fearless (2000)	Pain to Kill (2003)	Greatest Hits 1994-2004 (2004)

Singles from Pain to Kill
- 1. "I Just Wanna Be Mad" Released: August 19, 2002; 2. "Three Mississippi" Released: March 10, 2003; 3. "I Wanna Do It All" Released: August 25, 2003

Professional ratings
Review scores
Source	Rating
Allmusic	link
Robert Christgau	(2-star Honorable Mention)

Pain to Kill is the fifth studio album by Canadian country music artist Terri Clark. It was released through Mercury Nashville on January 14, 2003. The album has been certified Gold by the RIAA, her last certified studio album to date in the United States. The album was produced by Byron Gallimore and Keith Stegall. Unlike her previous albums, Clark did not have a large hand in writing, only co-writing five of the album's twelve tracks.

The album received positive reviews from music critics. Three singles were released from the album, including the top three hit singles "I Just Wanna Be Mad" and "I Wanna Do It All", with the former becoming her highest peaking single of all time on the Billboard Hot 100. The album also spawned the top-30 hit "Three Mississippi".

The album debuted at number five on the Top Country Albums chart and also became Clark's first album to chart in Australia. The album track "Not a Bad Thing" was later recorded by American country singer Trisha Yearwood for her eleventh studio album Heaven, Heartache and the Power of Love (2007). By April 2003, the album had already sold 123,000 copies.

== Track listing ==
No.	Title	Writer(s)	Length
1.	"I Just Wanna Be Mad"	Kelley Lovelace, Lee Thomas Miller	3:26
2.	"Three Mississippi"	Angelo Petraglia, Hillary Lindsey, Troy Verges	3:59
3.	"Pain to Kill"	Steve Bogard, Tom Shapiro	3:49
4.	"I Just Called to Say Goodbye"	Julie Adkison, Connie Harrington	3:46
5.	"I Wanna Do It All"	Rick Giles, Gilles Godard, Tim Nichols	2:53
6.	"The One You Love"	Gary Burr, Terri Clark	3:21
7.	"Almost Gone"	Clark, Lisa Scott, Stephony Smith	3:36
8.	"Working Girl"	Matraca Berg, Randy Scruggs	3:22
9.	"Better Than You"	Clark, Rory Lee Feek	4:03
10.	"Not a Bad Thing"	Dave Berg, Deanna Bryant, Sunny Russ	3:47
11.	"The First to Fall"	Pat Bunch, Clark, Georgia Middleman	4:26
12.	"God and Me"	Carol Ann Brown, Clark	4:12

== Personnel ==
- Pat Buchanan – electric guitar
- Mark Casstevens – banjo
- Terri Clark – lead vocals
- J.T. Corenflos – electric guitar
- Stuart Duncan – fiddle, mandolin
- Paul Franklin – steel guitar
- Vince Gill – background vocals
- Kenny Greenberg – electric guitar
- Aubrey Haynie – fiddle
- Wes Hightower – background vocals
- John Hughey – steel guitar
- Hillary Lindsey – background vocals
- B. James Lowry – electric guitar
- Liana Manis – background vocals
- Brent Mason – electric guitar
- Steve Nathan – keyboards
- Gary Prim – piano
- John Wesley Ryles – background vocals
- Leslie Satcher – background vocals
- Keith Stegall – harmonica
- Bruce Watkins – banjo
- Biff Watson – acoustic guitar
- Lonnie Wilson – drums
- Glenn Worf – bass guitar
- Jonathan Yudkin – fiddle

== Charts ==
=== Weekly charts ===
Chart (2003)	Peak position
Australian Albums (ARIA Charts)	86
US Billboard 200	27
US Top Country Albums (Billboard)	5

=== Year-end charts ===
Chart (2003)	Position
US Top Country Albums (Billboard)	42
