= The Definitive Collection (Sandi Patty album) =

Compilation album by Sandi Patty
- Released: 2007
- Recorded: 1981–1990
- Genre: CCM
- Label: Word, Curb
- Producer: Greg Nelson

Sandi Patty chronology
The Definitive Collection (2007)	Falling Forward (2007)

The Definitive Collection is a compilation collection of Sandi Patty's greatest hits from the Word catalogue.

== Track listings ==
There are ten tracks on the album.

1. "How Majestic Is Your Name"
2. "More Than Wonderful" (with Larnelle Harris)
3. "In The Name Of The Lord"
4. "Via Dolorosa"
5. "They Could Not"
6. "Was It A Morning Like This"
7. "Love In Any Language"
8. "Upon This Rock"
9. "Another Time, Another Place" (with Wayne Watson)
10. "We Shall Behold Him"

== Personnel ==
- Sandi Patty – audio production, composer, primary artist, producer)
- Greg Nelson – producer
