= Suddenly Single =

Single by Terri Clark

from the album Terri Clark
- B-side: "Catch 22"
- Released: June 24, 1996
- Genre: Country
- Length: 3:59
- Label: Mercury
- Songwriters: Terri Clark; Tom Shapiro; Chris Waters
- Producers: Keith Stegall; Chris Waters

Terri Clark singles chronology
"If I Were You" (1996)	"Suddenly Single" (1996)	"Poor Poor Pitiful Me" (1996)

"Suddenly Single" is a song co-written and recorded by Canadian country music artist Terri Clark. It was released in June 1996 as the fourth and final single from her self-titled debut album. The song reached #11 on the Canadian RPM Country Tracks chart in June 1996. It also peaked at #34 on the U.S. Billboard Hot Country Singles & Tracks. The song was written by Clark, Tom Shapiro and Chris Waters.

== Chart performance ==
"Suddenly Single" debuted at number 54 on the U.S. Billboard Hot Country Singles & Tracks for the week of July 13, 1996.

Chart (1996)	Peak position
Canada Country Singles (RPM)	11
US Hot Country Songs (Billboard)	34
