= Classic (Terri Clark album) =

Studio album by Terri Clark
- Released: November 13, 2012
- Genre: Country
- Length: 37:10
- Labels: BareTrack; EMI Canada
- Producers: Terri Clark; Jeff Jones

Terri Clark chronology
Roots and Wings (2011)	Classic (2012)	Some Songs (2014)

Singles from Classic
- 1. "Love Is a Rose" Released: October 23, 2012; 2. "I'm Movin' On" Released: February 5, 2013

Professional ratings
Review scores
Source	Rating
Country Universe	3.5/5 stars
Country Weekly	4.5/5 stars
Roughstock	4/5 stars

Classic is the ninth studio album by Canadian country music artist Terri Clark. It was released on November 13, 2012 via BareTrack Records/EMI Canada. The album features duets with Reba McEntire, Jann Arden, Dierks Bentley, Tanya Tucker and Dean Brody.

== Background ==
Classic consists of cover versions of songs that have played an important part in Terri's life. "This is the type of 'timeless' project I've wanted to do my whole life. It signifies so many things for me- my family roots, the Opry, my history and influences as an artist, and the songs that make up so much of the fabric of country music"

-Terri Clark

== Critical reception ==
The album received positive reviews from music critics. Matt Bjorke of Roughstock gave the album four stars out of five, praising Clark's vocal performances.

== Singles ==
The lead single from Classic, "Love Is a Rose", was released on October 23, 2012. "I'm Movin' On" was released on February 5, 2013 as the second single off the album. The music video premiered on February 16 on the Chevrolet Top 20 Countdown on CMT Canada. The video premiered on VEVO on March 18, 2013.

== Track listing ==
No.	Title	Writer(s)	Length
1.	"It Wasn't God Who Made Honky Tonk Angels"	J. D. "Jay" Miller	3:32
2.	"Love Is a Rose"	Neil Young	3:04
3.	"How Blue" (with Reba McEntire)	John Moffat	3:01
4.	"Don't Come Home A' Drinkin' (With Lovin' on Your Mind)"	Loretta Lynn, Peggy Sue	2:32
5.	"Gentle on My Mind"	John Hartford	3:27
6.	"Golden Ring" (with Dierks Bentley)	Bobby Braddock, Rafe Van Hoy	3:07
7.	"Two More Bottles of Wine"	Delbert McClinton	3:00
8.	"Leavin' on Your Mind" (with Jann Arden)	Webb Pierce, Wayne Walker	4:34
9.	"Swinging Doors"	Merle Haggard	2:58
10.	"Delta Dawn" (with Tanya Tucker)	Larry Collins, Alex Harvey	4:18
11.	"I'm Movin' On" (with Dean Brody)	Hank Snow	3:37
Total length:			37:10

== Personnel ==
- Jann Arden – duet vocals on "Leavin' on Your Mind"
- Jason Barry – acoustic guitar
- Dierks Bentley – duet vocals on "Golden Ring"
- Dean Brody – duet vocals on "I'm Movin' On"
- Jason Cheek – drums, percussion
- Terri Clark – acoustic guitar, lead vocals, background vocals
- Chris Cottros – electric guitar
- Chad Cromwell – drums, percussion
- Stuart Duncan – fiddle
- Paul Franklin – steel guitar
- Kenny Greenberg – electric guitar
- Tania Hancheroff – background vocals
- Tony Harrell – accordion
- Ty Herndon – background vocals
- Wes Hightower – background vocals
- John Hobbs – keyboards, piano
- B. James Lowry – acoustic guitar
- Reba McEntire – duet vocals on "How Blue"
- Mark McIntyre – bass guitar
- Brent Mason – electric guitar
- Lyle Molzan – drums, percussion
- Michael Rhodes – bass guitar
- Ilya Toshinsky – banjo, acoustic guitar
- Tanya Tucker – duet vocals on "Delta Dawn"
- Glenn Worf – bass guitar

== Chart performance ==
Singles

Year	Single	Peak positions
Year	Single	CAN Country
2012	"Love Is a Rose"	31
2013	"I'm Movin' On" (featuring Dean Brody)	28
