= No Fear (Terri Clark song) =

2001 song performed by Terri Clark

Single by Terri Clark

from the album Fearless
- B-side: "Easy from Now On"
- Released: January 29, 2001
- Recorded: 2000
- Genre: Country
- Length: 3:58
- Label: Mercury Nashville
- Songwriter(s): Terri Clark; Mary Chapin Carpenter
- Producer(s): Steuart Smith; Keith Stegall; Terri Clark

Terri Clark singles chronology
"A Little Gasoline" (2000)	"No Fear" (2001)	"Getting There" (2001)

"No Fear" is a song by Canadian country music artist Terri Clark, recorded for her fourth studio album Fearless (2000). It was co-written and co-produced by Clark, with writing credits also going to Mary Chapin Carpenter and production credits also going to Steuart Smith and Keith Stegall. It was released on January 29, 2001 as the second single from the album.

== Music video ==
The music video for "No Fear" was directed by Eric Welch. It debuted to CMT on January 21, 2001.

== Charts ==
Chart (2001)	Peak position
US Hot Country Songs (Billboard)	27

== Release history ==
Release dates and format(s) for "No Fear"
Region	Date	Format(s)	Label(s)	Ref.
United States	January 29, 2001	Country radio	Mercury Nashville	
