= Raising the Bar (album) =

Studio album by Terri Clark
- Released: September 14, 2018
- Genre: Country
- Label: BareTrack Records

Terri Clark chronology
Some Songs (2014)	Raising the Bar (2018)	It’s Christmas…Cheers! (2020)

Singles from Raising the Bar
- 1. "Young as We Are Tonight" Released: August 24, 2018

Raising the Bar is the eleventh studio album by Canadian country music artist Terri Clark. It was released on September 14, 2018 via BareTrack Records. The album's first single, "Young as We Are Tonight", was released to Canadian country radio on August 24, 2018.

== Commercial performance ==
The album debuted at No. 42 on Billboard's Independent Albums, selling 1,100 copies in the first week.

== Track listing ==
Track listing adapted from iTunes.

No.	Title	Writer(s)	Length
1.	"Givin' up Givin' a Damn"	Craig Wiseman; Chris Stevens	3:05
2.	"Cowboys in This Town"	Gregory Curtis Bates; Alex Kline; Erik Dylan Anderson	3:14
3.	"Weddings, Funerals, and Empty Hotel Bars"	Erin Enderlin; Stephanie Lambring	4:10
4.	"Young as We Are Tonight"	Rodney Clawson; David Lee Murphy; Ross Copperman	2:55
5.	"Half a Bottle Down"	Terri Clark; Maia Sharp; Gabe Dixon	3:56
6.	"Bloody Mary Morning"	Clark; Kline; Jason Matthews	3:38
7.	"Watered Down Whiskey"	Clark; Kline; Enderlin	3:14
8.	"As Long as There's a Bar"	Terri Clark; Enderlin	3:16
9.	"Right Where You Left Me"	Clark; Kline; Enderlin	3:25
10.	"You Can Have This Town"	Melissa Peirce; Sara Haze; Ben Caver	3:46
11.	"The One That Got Away"	Clark; Kline; Enderlin	4:12
12.	"The Encore"	Clark; Sharp; Garrison Star	3:02
13.	"Better Than I Was"	Clark; Nicole Witt; Chad Cates	3:37

== Chart performance ==
Chart (2018)	Peak position
US Country Album Sales (Billboard)	23
US Independent Albums (Billboard)	42
