= The Definitive Collection (Archie Roach album) =

Greatest hits album by Archie Roach
- Released: 5 July 2004
- Recorded: 1990–2002
- Label: Mushroom Records, Warner Music Australia
- Producer: Paul Kelly, David Bridie, Malcolm Burn, Richard Pleasance

Archie Roach chronology
The Tracker (2002)	The Definitive Collection (2004)	Ruby (2005)

The Definitive Collection is the first greatest hits album by Australian singer song writer Archie Roach. The album features tracks from Roach's first four studio albums and was released in July 2004.

== Track listing ==
No.	Title	Writer(s)	Album	Length
1.	"Took the Children Away"	Archie Roach	Charcoal Lane	5:24
2.	"A Child Was Born Here"	Roach	Looking for Butter Boy	4:21
3.	"Just a Little Time"	Roach	Sensual Being	4:34
4.	"Tell Me Why"	Roach	Jamu Dreaming	3:24
5.	"Beggar Man"	Roach	Looking for Butter Boy	3:50
6.	"Alien Invasion"	Roach	Sensual Being	4:52
7.	"From Paradise"	Roach	Jamu Dreaming	4:19
8.	"Reach for You"	Roach	Looking for Butter Boy	3:47
9.	"Louis St. John"	Roach	Looking for Butter Boy	5:32
10.	"Free to Be a Man"	Roach	Sensual Being	3:50
11.	"Walking Into Doors"	Roach	Jamu Dreaming	4:50
12.	"Jamu Dreaming"	Roach	Jamu Dreaming	4:18
13.	"Weeping in the Forest"	Roach	Jamu Dreaming	4:51
14.	"Beautiful Child"	Roach	Charcoal Lane	4:01
15.	"Small Child"	Roach	Sensual Being	5:35
16.	"Charcoal Lane"	Roach	Charcoal Lane	3:21
17.	"Down City Streets"	Roach, Ruby Hunter	Charcoal Lane	4:04
18.	"Watching Over Me"	Roach	Looking for Butter Boy	4:03

== Release history ==
Country	Date	Format	Label	Catalogue
Australia	5 July 2004	Compact Disc; Digital download	Mushroom Records/Warner Music Australia	337682
