= Fearless (Terri Clark album) =

Studio album by Terri Clark
- Released: September 19, 2000
- Genre: Country
- Length: 45:09
- Label: Mercury Nashville
- Producer: Keith Stegall; Steuart Smith; Terri Clark

Terri Clark chronology
How I Feel (1998)	Fearless (2000)	Pain to Kill (2003)

Singles from Fearless
- 1. "A Little Gasoline" Released: July 10, 2000; 2. "No Fear" Released: February 10, 2001; 3. "Getting There" Released: June 18, 2001; 4. "Empty" Released: 2001 (Canada only)

Fearless is the fourth studio album by Canadian country music singer Terri Clark. It was released in September 2000 via Mercury Nashville. The album produced three singles in "A Little Gasoline", "No Fear" and "Getting There", which respectively reached No. 13, 27, and 41 on the Billboard country charts. A fourth single, "Empty", was only released in Canada. Clark produced the album with Steuart Smith, with assistance from Keith Stegall on "No Fear" and "A Little Gasoline".

In 2003, Clark stated that she did not have any expectations for the album, and that she needed to record it for artistic purposes.

== Critical reception ==
Professional ratings
Review scores
Source	Rating
Allmusic	4.5/5 stars

Thom Jurek of Allmusic referred to the album as "an attempt at breaking out of the bonds of contemporary country without leaving the music entirely behind" and praising Clark's songwriting.

== Track listing ==
No.	Title	Writer(s)	Length
1.	"No Fear"	Mary Chapin Carpenter, Terri Clark	3:58
2.	"Sometimes Goodbye"	Beth Nielsen Chapman, T. Clark, Annie Roboff	4:09
3.	"Take My Time"	Angelo Petraglia, T. Clark	3:46
4.	"Empty"	Gary Butler, T. Clark	4:16
5.	"Getting There"	Gary Burr, T. Clark	3:08
6.	"Easy From Now On"	Carlene Carter, Susanna Clark	3:40
7.	"A Little Gasoline"	Dean Miller, Tammy Rogers	3:08
8.	"The Last Thing I Wanted"	Carpenter, Kim Richey	3:32
9.	"To Tell You Everything"	Carpenter, T. Clark	3:16
10.	"The Real Thing"	Petraglia, T. Clark	3:29
11.	"Midnight's Gone"	Burr, T. Clark	3:51
12.	"Good Mother"	Robert Foster, Jann Arden	4:56

== Personnel ==
Adapted from liner notes.

- Beth Nielson Chapman - background vocals (tracks 2, 12)
- Terri Clark - lead vocals (all tracks), background vocals (tracks 1, 3, 5, 8–11), acoustic guitar (track 12)
- Dan Dugmore - electric guitar (track 1), pedal steel guitar (tracks 1, 2, 5, 7, 9)
- Stuart Duncan - fiddle (track 5)
- Larry Franklin - fiddle (track 7)
- Pam Gadd - banjo (tracks 2, 6, 7)
- Emmylou Harris - background vocals (track 6)
- B. James Lowry - acoustic guitar (tracks 1, 7)
- Greg Morrow - drums (tracks 1, 7), percussion (track 1)
- Steve Nathan - synthesizer (track 4)
- Shawn Pelton - drums (tracks 2–6, 8–11), drum loops (track 2, 4, 8), percussion (tracks 2–5, 9–11)
- Gary Prim - Hammond B-3 organ (tracks 1, 7), piano (track 7)
- Michael Rhodes - bass guitar (tracks 2–4, 6, 8–11)
- Chris Rodriguez - background vocals (tracks 3, 10)
- Tammy Rogers - background vocals (track 7)
- John Wesley Ryles - background vocals (tracks 1, 7)
- Steuart Smith - accordion (tracks 1, 6), acoustic guitar (tracks 2–4, 6, 10, 11), baritone guitar (tracks 4, 10, 11), bouzouki (tracks 5, 8, 10), electric guitar (all tracks except 11 & 12), Hammond B-3 organ (tracks 2, 8, 11), harmonica (tracks 3, 8), hi-string acoustic guitar (track 12), mandolin (tracks 2, 8, 11), piano (tracks 4, 5), synthesizer (tracks 4, 11), Wurlitzer (tracks 2, 3, 5, 11)
- Benmont Tench - Hammond B-3 organ (tracks 3, 5, 9, 10), Wurlitzer (track 8)
- Biff Watson - 12-string acoustic guitar (track 10), acoustic guitar (tracks 2, 5, 6, 8, 9)
- Dennis Wilson - background vocals (track 9)
- Glenn Worf - bass guitar (tracks 1, 5, 7)
- Jonathan Yudkin - fiddle (track 6), strings (track 12), string arrangements (track 12)

== Charts ==
=== Weekly charts ===
Chart (2000)	Peak position
Canadian Country Albums (RPM)	4
US Billboard 200	85
US Top Country Albums (Billboard)	8

=== Year-end charts ===
Chart (2001)	Position
Canadian Country Albums (Nielsen SoundScan)	46
US Top Country Albums (Billboard)	69
