= Just the Same =

Studio album by Terri Clark
- Released: November 5, 1996
- Genre: Country
- Length: 36:46
- Label: Mercury
- Producer: Keith Stegall; Chris Waters; Terri Clark

Terri Clark chronology
Terri Clark (1995)	Just the Same (1996)	How I Feel (1998)

Singles from Just the Same
- 1. "Poor Poor Pitiful Me" Released: September 23, 1996; 2. "Emotional Girl" Released: January 6, 1997; 3. "Just the Same" Released: May 5, 1997; 4. "Something in the Water" Released: 1997

Professional ratings
Review scores
Source	Rating
Allmusic	3.5/5 stars

Just the Same is the second studio album by Canadian country music singer Terri Clark. It was released in late 1996 on Mercury Records. In the U.S., this album produced the singles "Poor Poor Pitiful Me" (a cover of a Warren Zevon song which was also a Top 40 pop hit for Linda Ronstadt), "Emotional Girl", and the title track, which respectively reached #5, #10 and #49 on the country charts. In Canada, the first two singles were both #1 on the country charts, while the title track was a #16. The fourth single, "Something in the Water", reached #39 in Canada, but did not chart in the U.S. The album was certified platinum by the RIAA.

== Track listing ==
No.	Title	Writer(s)	Length
1.	"Emotional Girl"	Rick Bowles, Terri Clark, Chris Waters	3:08
2.	"Poor Poor Pitiful Me"	Warren Zevon	3:10
3.	"Just the Same"	Clark, Waters, Tom Shapiro	3:13
4.	"Something in the Water"	Clark, Waters, Shapiro	3:54
5.	"Neon Flame"	Clark, Waters, Chuck Jones	3:02
6.	"Any Woman"	Clark, Waters, Shapiro	3:20
7.	"Twang Thang"	Clark, Waters, Shapiro	3:17
8.	"You Do or You Don't"	Bob DiPiero, Karen Staley	3:09
9.	"Keeper of the Flame"	Clark	4:06
10.	"Not What I Wanted to Hear"	Clark, Waters, Shapiro	3:35
11.	"Hold Your Horses"	Pam Gadd, Carl Jackson	2:52

== Personnel ==
As listed in liner notes.

- Eddie Bayers – drums
- Terri Clark – lead vocals
- Stuart Duncan – fiddle
- Paul Franklin – pedal steel guitar, lap steel guitar
- Aubrey Haynie – fiddle
- Brent Mason – electric guitar
- Terry McMillan – cowbell
- Duncan Mullins – bass guitar
- Steve Nathan – piano
- Gary Prim – piano
- Michael Rhodes – bass guitar
- Brent Rowan – acoustic guitar, electric guitar
- John Wesley Ryles – background vocals
- Ricky Skaggs – background vocals
- Joe Spivey – fiddle
- John Willis – acoustic guitar
- Dennis Wilson – background vocals
- Cheryl Wolff – background vocals

Strings performed and arranged by Carl Marsh.

== Chart performance ==
Chart (1996)	Peak position
Canadian RPM Country Albums	3
Canadian RPM Top Albums	47
U.S. Billboard Top Country Albums	10
U.S. Billboard 200	58
