= Dirty Girl (song) =

Single by Terri Clark

from the album My Next Life
- Released: April 2, 2007
- Genre: Country
- Length: 3:02
- Label: BNA
- Songwriters: Tom Shapiro; Rivers Rutherford
- Producer: Garth Fundis

Terri Clark singles chronology
"Slow News Day" (2006)	"Dirty Girl" (2007)	"In My Next Life" (2007)

Music video
- "Dirty Girl" at CMT.com

"Dirty Girl" is a song recorded by Canadian country music artist Terri Clark. It was released in July 2007 as the first single from her unreleased album, My Next Life. It reached number 30 on the Billboard Hot Country Songs chart in the United States.

The song was written by Tom Shapiro and Rivers Rutherford and intended to be performed by a man. Clark reworked the song to be performed from a female perspective.

== Chart performance ==
Chart (2007)	Peak position
Canada Country (Billboard)	13
Canada Hot 100 (Billboard)	68
US Hot Country Songs (Billboard)	30
