= Emotional Girl =

Single by Terri Clark

from the album Just the Same
- B-side: "Something in the Water"
- Released: January 6, 1997
- Genre: Country
- Length: 3:08
- Label: Mercury Nashville
- Songwriters: Terri Clark; Rick Bowles; Chris Waters
- Producers: Keith Stegall; Chris Waters; Terri Clark

Terri Clark singles chronology
"Poor Poor Pitiful Me" (1996)	"Emotional Girl" (1997)	"Just the Same" (1997)

"Emotional Girl" is a song co-written and recorded by Canadian country music artist Terri Clark. It was released in January 1997 as the second single from Clark's album Just the Same. The song reached number 1 on the RPM Country Tracks chart in March 1997 and number 10 on the Billboard Hot Country Singles & Tracks chart. It was written by Clark, Rick Bowles and Chris Waters.

== Music video ==
The music video was directed by Michael Merriman and premiered in early 1997. The lead male in the video is actor Kevin Sizemore. It was filmed in Nashville, Tennessee.

== Chart performance ==
"Emotional Girl" debuted at number 66 on the U.S. Billboard Hot Country Singles & Tracks for the week of January 11, 1997.

Chart (1997)	Peak position
Canada Country Singles (RPM)	1
US Bubbling Under Hot 100 (Billboard)	13
US Hot Country Songs (Billboard)	10

=== Year-end charts ===
Chart (1997)	Position
Canada Country Tracks (RPM)	3
US Country Songs (Billboard)	72
