= In My Next Life =

Single by Terri Clark

from the album My Next Life
- Released: October 24, 2007 (Canada); November 27, 2007 (U.S.)
- Genre: Country
- Length: 4:10
- Label: BNA
- Songwriters: Terri Clark; Jim Collins; Tom Shapiro
- Producer: Garth Fundis

Terri Clark singles chronology
"Dirty Girl" (2007)	"In My Next Life" (2007)	"Gypsy Boots" (2009)

"In My Next Life" is a song co-written and recorded by Canadian country music artist Terri Clark. It was released in October 2007 as the second single from her unreleased album My Next Life. The song was written by Clark, Tom Shapiro and Jim Collins.

It peaked at number 36 on the Billboard Hot Country Songs chart, and was her final single to chart in the United States. In Canada, it reached the top of the Billboard Canada Country chart dated February 23, 2008, and is her final Number One hit to date there.

== Charts ==
Chart (2007–2008)	Peak position
Canada (Canadian Hot 100)	66
Canada Country (Billboard)	1
US Hot Country Songs (Billboard)	36

Year-end chart performance
Chart (2008)	Position
Canada Country (Billboard)	6
