= A Little Gasoline =

2000 single by Terri Clark

Single by Terri Clark

from the album Fearless
- B-side: "Empty"
- Released: July 10, 2000
- Genre: Country
- Length: 3:08
- Label: Mercury
- Songwriters: Dean Miller; Tammy Rogers
- Producers: Keith Stegall; Steuart Smith; Terri Clark

Terri Clark singles chronology
"Unsung Hero" (1999)	"A Little Gasoline" (2000)	"No Fear" (2001)

"A Little Gasoline" is a song written by Dean Miller and Tammy Rogers, and recorded by Canadian country music artist Terri Clark. It was released in July 2000 as the first single from her album Fearless. The song reached number 9 on the RPM Country Tracks chart in September 2000 and number 13 on the Billboard Hot Country Singles & Tracks chart.

== Critical reception ==
Deborah Evans Price, of Billboard magazine reviewed the song favorably, calling the song a "midtempo outing, a meaty production propelled by plenty o' steel fiddles and the aforementioned banjo." She goes on to say that the "see-ya lyric works well enough, as tired as the road/car imagery may be-seems like nobody ever exits a relationship on a bicycle."

== Music video ==
The music video was directed by Thom Oliphant and premiered in mid-2000. Most of the video was filmed on a section of Alberta Highway 2 near Red Deer, Alberta known as Gasoline Alley.

== Personnel ==
Compiled from liner notes.

- Terri Clark – lead vocals
- Dan Dugmore – pedal steel guitar
- Larry Franklin – fiddle
- Pam Gadd – banjo
- B. James Lowry – acoustic guitar
- Greg Morrow – drums
- Gary Prim – Hammond B-3 organ, piano
- Tammy Rogers – background vocals
- John Wesley Ryles – background vocals
- Steuart Smith – electric guitar
- Glenn Worf – bass guitar

== Chart performance ==
"A Little Gasoline" debuted at number 67 on the U.S. Billboard Hot Country Singles & Tracks for the week of July 22, 2000.

Chart (2000)	Peak position
Canada Country Singles (RPM)	9
US Billboard Hot 100	75
US Hot Country Songs (Billboard)	13
