= When Boy Meets Girl (Terri Clark song) =

Single by Terri Clark

from the album Terri Clark
- B-side: "Flowers After the Fact"
- Released: October 23, 1995
- Genre: Country
- Length: 3:01
- Label: Mercury
- Songwriters: Terri Clark; Tom Shapiro; Chris Waters
- Producers: Keith Stegall; Chris Waters

Terri Clark singles chronology
"Better Things to Do" (1995)	"When Boy Meets Girl" (1995)	"If I Were You" (1996)

"When Boy Meets Girl" is a song recorded by Canadian country music artist Terri Clark, released on October 23, 1995 as the second single from her eponymous debut studio album. Clark co-write the single with Tom Shapiro and Chris Waters, with Chris Waters and Keith Stegall producing the track.

It was another hit for Clark, peaking at number three on both the US and Canada country charts.

== Content ==
The song is about the changes brought about in a young man's life "when boy meets girl."

== Critical reception ==
Deborah Evans Price, of Billboard magazine reviewed the song favorably, saying that Clark's "gutsy twang and the sharp production prowess of Keith Stegall and Chris Waters makes this a solid follow-up and another potential smash for Clark."

== Music video ==
The music video was directed by Michael Merriman and premiered in October 1995.

== Chart performance ==
"When Boy Meets Girl" debuted at number 75 on the U.S. Billboard Hot Country Singles & Tracks for the week of October 28, 1995.

Chart (1995–1996)	Peak position
Canada Country Singles (RPM)	3
US Bubbling Under Hot 100 (Billboard)	22
US Hot Country Songs (Billboard)	3

=== Year-end charts ===
Chart (1996)	Position
Canada Country Tracks (RPM)	29
US Country Songs (Billboard)	65
