= Terri Clark (album) =

Studio album by Terri Clark
- Released: August 8, 1995
- Studio: Sound Stage Studios; Cayman Moon Recorders; Battery Studios (Nashville, TN)
- Genre: Country
- Length: 40:24
- Label: Mercury Nashville
- Producer: Keith Stegall; Chris Waters

Terri Clark chronology
Terri Clark (1995)	Just the Same (1996)

Singles from Terri Clark
- 1. "Better Things to Do" Released: July 10, 1995; 2. "When Boy Meets Girl" Released: October 31, 1995; 3. "If I Were You" Released: February 27, 1996; 4. "Suddenly Single" Released: July 1, 1996

Professional ratings
Review scores
Source	Rating
Allmusic	3.5/5 stars

Terri Clark is the first album by Canadian country music artist Terri Clark. It was released on August 8, 1995, via Mercury Nashville. Clark signed with Mercury in 1994 after meeting with label executive Keith Stegall. Recording took place in studios across Nashville. Clark wrote or co-wrote all but one song on the album.

Four singles came from the album. "Better Things to Do" was released in July 1995 and proved to be a hit, reaching number 3 on both the US and Canadian country charts. Follow-ups "When Boy Meets Girl" and "If I Were You" were also successful, with the latter becoming Clark's first number one single on the RPM Country Tracks chart. A fourth single, "Suddenly Single", was a minor chart success.

The album topped the Heatseekers Albums chart while also reaching number 13 on the US Top Country Albums chart and number 2 on the Canadian RPM Country Albums chart. Terri Clark has gone on to be certified Platinum in the United States by the RIAA and 3× Platinum in Canada by the CRIA.

== Track listing ==
No.	Title	Writer(s)	Length
1.	"Better Things to Do"	Terri Clark; Tom Shapiro; Chris Waters	3:08
2.	"If I Were You"	Clark	3:54
3.	"Catch 22"	Clark; Waters; Bob Regan	3:20
4.	"Is Fort Worth Worth It"	Shapiro; Waters	3:20
5.	"When Boy Meets Girl"	Clark; Shapiro; Waters	3:01
6.	"Tyin' a Heart to a Tumbleweed"	Clark; Terry Clayton; Stan Lawrence	3:18
7.	"When We Had It Bad"	Clark; Shapiro; Waters	3:33
8.	"Suddenly Single"	Clark; Shapiro; Waters	3:59
9.	"Flowers After the Fact"	Clark; Shapiro; Waters	3:14
10.	"The Inside Story"	Clark; Clayton	3:51
11.	"Was There a Girl on Your Boys' Night Out"	Clark; Clayton; Lawrence	2:34
12.	"Something You Should've Said"	Clark; Waters	3:02
Total length:			40:24

== Personnel ==
- Eddie Bayers – drums
- Richard Bennett – electric guitar
- Terri Clark – lead vocals, background vocals
- Stuart Duncan – fiddle, mandolin
- Sonny Garrish – pedal steel guitar, lap steel guitar
- John Kelton – cowbell, percussion
- B. James Lowry – acoustic guitar
- Liana Manis – background vocals
- Brent Mason – electric guitar, tic tac bass, six-string bass
- Duncan Mullins – bass guitar
- Don Potter – acoustic guitar
- Matt Rollings – piano
- John Wesley Ryles – background vocals
- Joe Spivey – fiddle
- Biff Watson – acoustic guitar
- Dennis Wilson – background vocals
- Glenn Worf – bass guitar

== Charts ==
Terri Clark has sold one million copies in the United States as of 2012.

Chart (1995)	Peak position
Canadian RPM Country Albums	2
US Top Country Albums (Billboard)	13
US Billboard 200	79
US Heatseekers Albums (Billboard)	1
