= The Long Way Home (Terri Clark album) =

Studio album by Terri Clark
- Released: September 1, 2009
- Genre: Country
- Length: 42:34
- Label: BareTrack; Capitol Nashville/EMI Canada
- Producer: Terri Clark

Terri Clark chronology
Terri Clark Live: Road Rage (2009)	The Long Way Home (2009)	Roots and Wings (2011)

Singles from The Long Way Home
- 1. "Gypsy Boots" Released: June 28, 2009; 2. "If You Want Fire" Released: September 8, 2009; 3. "A Million Ways to Run" Released: January 2010; 4. "You Tell Me" Released: May 10, 2010

Professional ratings
Review scores
Source	Rating
Allmusic	4/5 stars
Engine 145	4/5 stars

The Long Way Home is the seventh studio album by Canadian country music artist Terri Clark. The album was released on September 1, 2009 to Canada first before getting an American release on October 20. The album was released through Capitol Records Nashville/EMI Canada and BareTrack Records.

The album received critical acclaim. Four singles were released, none of which charted on the US Hot Country Songs chart. The album's first two singles however, "Gypsy Boots" and "If You Want Fire", were both top ten Canadian country hits.

== Track listing ==
No.	Title	Writer(s)	Length
1.	"Gypsy Boots"	Terri Clark, Jon Randall, Leslie Satcher	3:51
2.	"If You Want Fire"	Clark, Tom Shapiro, Jimmy Ritchey	4:38
3.	"A Million Ways to Run"	Clark	4:19
4.	"What Happens in Vegas (Follows You Home)"	Clark, Maia Sharp	3:10
5.	"Merry Go Round"	Clark, Shapiro, Bobby Pinson	3:42
6.	"The One You Love" (featuring Vince Gill)	Gary Burr, Clark	3:23
7.	"Poor Girls Dream"	Clark, Shapiro, Jim Collins	3:06
8.	"If I Could Be You"	Clark, Karyn Rochelle	4:18
9.	"Tough with Me"	Clark, Shapiro, Collins	3:34
10.	"You Tell Me" (duet with Johnny Reid)	Burr, Clark	4:07
11.	"Gypsy Boots" (acoustic version)	Clark, Randall, Satcher	4:27

== Personnel ==
- Jason Barry – acoustic guitar, electric guitar
- Terri Clark – acoustic guitar, resonator guitar, lead vocals, background vocals
- Gary Craig – drums
- John Diamond – bass guitar, upright bass
- Stuart Duncan – fiddle, mandolin
- Chris Dunn – trombone
- Jeneé Fleenor – background vocals
- Shannon Forrest – drums
- Paul Franklin – dobro, steel guitar
- Vince Gill – vocals on "The One You Love"
- Kenny Greenberg – electric guitar
- Steve Herman – trumpet
- Wes Hightower – background vocals
- John Hobbs – Hammond B-3 organ, Wurlitzer
- Jim Horn – saxophone
- Mike Johnson – dobro, steel guitar
- Paul Leim – drums
- Brent Mason – electric guitar
- Johnny Reid – vocals on "You Tell Me"
- Bryan Sutton – banjo, mandolin
- Jonathan Yudkin – strings

== Chart performance ==
Chart (2009)	Peak position
Canadian Albums Chart	15
U.S. Billboard Top Country Albums	44
