= I Just Wanna Be Mad =

Single by Terri Clark

from the album Pain to Kill
- B-side: "Three Mississippi"
- Released: August 19, 2002
- Genre: Country
- Length: 3:26
- Label: Mercury Nashville
- Songwriters: Kelley Lovelace; Lee Thomas Miller
- Producer: Byron Gallimore

Terri Clark singles chronology
"Empty" (2001)	"I Just Wanna Be Mad" (2002)	"Three Mississippi" (2003)

Music video
- "I Just Wanna Be Mad" at CMT.com

"I Just Wanna Be Mad" is a song written by Kelley Lovelace and Lee Thomas Miller and recorded by Canadian country music artist Terri Clark. The song was released on August 19, 2002, as the lead single to her fifth studio album Pain to Kill (2003) through Mercury Nashville. The song was originally offered to John Michael Montgomery, but he passed on it.

The song peaked at number 2 on the US Hot Country Songs chart, and it reached number 27 on the Billboard Hot 100. The song was nominated at the 2003 Juno Awards for Country Recording of the Year. The music video was nominated at the 2003 CMT Flameworthy Awards for Female Video of the Year and Cocky Video of the Year.

== Background ==
The song was written by Kelley Lovelace and Lee Thomas Miller. It was originally intended to be recorded by musician John Michael Montgomery, whom Clark said was "really close to recording it." The track was also intended to be recorded by Sara Evans, but she would pass on it. The song nearly was not chosen as the lead single because Clark's label, Mercury Nashville, were determined to make "Three Mississippi" the lead, while Clark and her management were "fighting" for "I Just Wanna Be Mad" to be released.

== Critical reception ==
Deborah Evans Price, of Billboard magazine reviewed the song favorably, calling it an "uptempo, easy-to-sing-along-with, radio-friendly ode to the complexities of modern relationships, and Clark gives it all she's got." She goes on to say that the writers, Lovelace and Miller, have "crafted a lyric that examines the dynamics of relationships."

== Music video ==
The music video opens up with Clark performing the song with a guitar under strobe lights in downtown San Francisco. This undercuts with scenes of her and her boyfriend (who works as a hotel valet) fighting for an unknown reason. She enters her car and drives around Nashville. He begrudgingly waits for her to come back, and in the final scenes of the video she does return, as following the song's lyrics. He enters the passenger side of the car and she grimaces. The video ends with the two riding off together.

The video debuted to CMT's playlists for the week of September 22, 2002. It was nominated at the 2003 CMT Flameworthy Awards for both Female Video of the Year and Cocky Video of the Year.

== Chart performance ==
"I Just Wanna Be Mad" debuted at number 51 on the US Billboard Hot Country Songs the week of August 31, 2002. It reached its peak position of number 2 on the chart on February 22, 2003. It stayed 1 week in that position and 34 weeks overall on the chart.

On the Radio & Records Country Top 50, the single debuted on August 23, 2002, at number 48 with 282 total plays. On February 14, 2003, it rose to the number 1 position with 5730 total plays. It spent 26 weeks in total.

== Charts ==
Chart (2002–2003)	Peak position
US Country Top 50 (Radio & Records)	1
US Hot Country Songs (Billboard)	2
US Billboard Hot 100	27

=== Year-end charts ===
Chart (2003)	Position
US Country (Radio & Records)	10
US Country Songs (Billboard)	18

== Release history ==
Release dates and format(s) for "I Just Wanna Be Mad"
Region	Date	Format(s)	Label(s)	Ref.
United States	August 19, 2002	Country radio	Mercury Nashville	
