= Girls Lie Too =

Single by Terri Clark

from the album Greatest Hits 1994-2004
- Released: April 19, 2004
- Genre: Country
- Length: 3:35
- Label: Mercury Nashville
- Songwriters: Connie Harrington; Kelley Lovelace; Tim Nichols
- Producer: Byron Gallimore

Terri Clark singles chronology
"I Wanna Do It All" (2003)	"Girls Lie Too" (2004)	"The World Needs a Drink" (2004)

Music video
- "Girls Lie Too" at CMT.com

"Girls Lie Too" is a song written by Tim Nichols, Kelley Lovelace and Connie Harrington, and recorded by Canadian country music singer Terri Clark. It was released to country radio on April 19, 2004, as the sole single to Clark's album Greatest Hits 1994–2004. "Girls Lie Too" was one of two songs recorded for the compilation, the other being "One of the Guys".

The song topped the Billboard Hot Country Songs chart and peaked at number two on the Radio & Records Canada Country Top 30. In the United States, it was her first number one hit since "You're Easy on the Eyes" in 1998.

== Content ==
The narrator addresses several lies that women tend to tell regarding their expectations of their significant others. For example, it doesn't matter how much money they make, what car they drive, or how much they weigh; and it's interesting to listen to them brag about golf, hunting, and getting wings at Hooters.

== Critical reception ==
Deborah Evans Price, of Billboard magazine reviewed the song favorably, saying that "a clever lyric combined with a spirited performance make this highly compatible with previous Clark hits." and "boasts a lively tempo that makes it great summer radio fare, and the lyric will make listeners chuckle."

== Music video ==
The music video shows a woman, played by LaTresa Smith with Pirates of the Caribbean character Jack Sparrow as her dream lover, played by video director Shaun Silva. At the end, she calls him "Johnny" in bed. The video also features a cameo appearance by Wayne Newton.

The video for "Girls Lie Too" was released to CMT and Great American Country on June 13, 2004.

== Chart performance ==
"Girls Lie Too" debuted on the Billboard Hot Country Singles & Tracks (now Hot Country Songs) the week of April 24, 2004, at number 53, becoming the "Hot Shot Debut" of the week. The song rose to the top spot of the chart on September 11. In its September 11, 2004, issue, Billboard magazine noted the song likely went number one due to stations being sponsored to play the song heavily during the very early morning, with the magazine also noting that compared to its last week gain of only 237 spins, the song garnered gains of 715 spins, of which 287 came from the early daytime. "Girls Lie Too" spent a single week at number one; the song would spend 24 weeks on the chart in total.

"Girls Lie Too" debuted on the Radio & Records Canada Country Top 30 chart the week of May 7, 2004, at number 25. The song rose to its peak position of number two on August 20. The song would go on to spend 23 weeks on the chart.

== Charts ==
Chart (2004)	Peak position
Canada Country (Radio & Records)	2
US Hot Country Songs (Billboard)	1
US Billboard Hot 100	36

=== Year-end charts ===
Chart (2004)	Position
Canada Country (Radio & Records)	1
US Country Songs (Billboard	24

== Release history ==
Release dates and format(s) for "Girls Lie Too"
Region	Date	Format(s)	Label(s)	Ref.
United States	April 19, 2004	Country radio	Mercury Nashville	
