= Better Things to Do =

Single by Terri Clark

from the album Terri Clark
- B-side: "Tyin' a Heart to a Tumbleweed"
- Released: July 10, 1995
- Genre: Country
- Length: 3:08
- Label: PolyGram/Mercury
- Songwriters: Terri Clark; Tom Shapiro; Chris Waters
- Producers: Chris Waters; Keith Stegall

Terri Clark singles chronology
"Better Things to Do" (1995)	"When Boy Meets Girl" (1995)

"Better Things to Do" is the debut single by Canadian country music artist Terri Clark. It was released in July 1995 and is from her self-titled debut album. The song was written by Clark, Tom Shapiro, and Chris Waters. It was a top 10 hit on both the U.S. and Canadian country charts, where it peaked at number 3 on both.

== Content ==
"Better Things to Do" is an up-tempo song about a narrator who realizes that she has "better things to do" than to sit around and cry over her ended relationship. At the same time, her man wants her back, thinking she's lost without him.

== Critical reception ==
Deborah Evans Price of Billboard magazine reviewed the song favorably, calling it a "good uptempo tune with a solid delivery."

== Music video ==
Terri Clark's first music video was released for the song, directed by Michael Merriman. In the video, Clark is shown playing her guitar out in the desert as her ex is attempting to use a payphone to reach her. Later, she hops into her jeep and drives in circles around him as he pleads for her to come back to him. Eventually she drives off, leaving him in a cloud of dust.

== Chart performance ==
"Better Things to Do" debuted at number 72 on the U.S. Billboard Hot Country Singles & Tracks chart for the week of July 15, 1995.

Chart (1995)	Peak position
Canada Country Singles (RPM)	3
US Hot Country Songs (Billboard)	3

=== Year-end charts ===
Chart (1995)	Position
Canada Country Tracks (RPM)	64
US Country Songs (Billboard)	38
