= I Wanna Do It All =

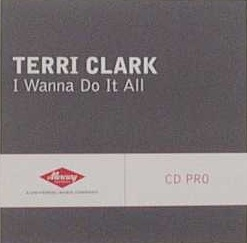

Single by Terri Clark

from the album Pain to Kill
- B-side: "Better Than You"
- Released: August 18, 2003
- Genre: Country
- Length: 2:53
- Label: Mercury Nashville
- Songwriters: Rick Giles; Gilles Godard; Tim Nichols
- Producer: Byron Gallimore

Terri Clark singles chronology
| "Three Mississippi" (2003) | "I Wanna Do It All" (2003) | "Girls Lie Too" (2004) |

Music video
- "I Wanna Do It All" at CMT.com

"I Wanna Do It All" is a song by Canadian country music artist Terri Clark, recorded for her fifth studio album Pain to Kill (2003). The song was written by Tim Nichols, Rick Giles, and Gilles Godard and produced by Byron Gallimore. The song was released on August 18, 2003 as the third and final single from the album to country radio through Mercury Nashville. The song lyrically is about what someone would do if they can get away from all their problems.

After the failure of the previous single "Three Mississippi", "I Wanna Do It All" returned Clark back into the top ten of the country charts, peaking at number three on the US Hot Country Songs alongside peaking at number 38 on the Billboard Hot 100.

== Content ==
Considered a women's anthem, the song finds Clark singing about all of the things she would do if she could get away. Multiple versions were recorded for airplay in specific American cities, replacing the album lyric "see the Yankees play ball" with baseball or football teams in that area. An example is the Washington, D.C. version, which replaced the Yankees with the Washington Redskins NFL team. Others include Baltimore referencing the Baltimore Ravens and Orioles, New England referencing the New England Patriots, some parts of Boston referencing Red Sox, Arizona referencing the Arizona Diamondbacks, Florida referencing the Florida Gators, and Wisconsin with the Green Bay Packers.

== Critical reception ==
Deborah Evans Price of Billboard magazine reviewed the song favorably, saying that the song is "marked by Clark's effervescent delivery and a well-written lyric that is instantly relatable." She adds that initially, Clark's performance "reverberates with the frustration often produced by the tedium of daily living, but when she romps into the chorus and unleashes her litany of hopes, dreams, and desires, the longing in her vocal is palpable." She concludes her review by saying that it is "one of those feel-good songs that is an immediate musical motivator sure to make listeners shake off their doldrums and reach for that brass ring-or perhaps the nearest shot of tequila."

== Music video ==
A live music video was directed by Milton Lage. The video was taken from various performance from the 2003 CMT On Tour concert.

The video debuted to Country Music Television (CMT) on September 28, 2003. The video was never released to Great American Country.

== Charts ==
"I Wanna Do It All" debuted at number 59 on the US Billboard Hot Country Songs chart the week of August 30, 2003.

=== Weekly charts ===
| Chart (2003–2004) | Peak position |
|---|---|
| US Hot Country Songs (Billboard) | 3 |
| US Billboard Hot 100 | 38 |
| US Country Top 50 (Radio & Records) | 4 |

=== Year-end charts ===
2003 year-end chart performance for "I Wanna Do It All"
| Chart (2003) | Position |
|---|---|
| US Country Songs (Billboard) | 98 |
| US Country (Radio & Records) | 96 |

2004 year-end chart performance for "I Wanna Do It All"
| Chart (2004) | Position |
|---|---|
| US Country Songs (Billboard) | 36 |
| US Country (Radio & Records) | 24 |
