= If I Were You (Terri Clark song) =

- US commercial cassette single

Single by Terri Clark

from the album Terri Clark
- B-side: "Something You Should've Said"
- Released: February 27, 1996
- Genre: Country
- Length: 3:54
- Label: Mercury
- Songwriter: Terri Clark
- Producers: Keith Stegall; Chris Waters

Terri Clark singles chronology
"When Boy Meets Girl" (1995)	"If I Were You" (1996)	"Suddenly Single" (1996)

"If I Were You" is a song written and recorded by Canadian country music artist Terri Clark. It was released in February 1996 as the third single from her album Terri Clark. The song reached number 1 on the RPM Country Tracks chart in June 1996.

== Music video ==
The music video was directed by Michael Merriman and premiered in February 1996.

== Chart performance ==
"If I Were You" debuted at number 58 on the U.S. Billboard Hot Country Singles & Tracks for the week of March 9, 1996.

Chart (1996)	Peak position
Canada Country Singles (RPM)	1
US Bubbling Under Hot 100 (Billboard)	13
US Hot Country Songs (Billboard)	8

=== Year-end charts ===
Chart (1996)	Position
Canada Country Tracks (RPM)	5
US Country Songs (Billboard)	45
