= Terri Clark =

Canadian country music artist (born 1968)

Terri Clark CM
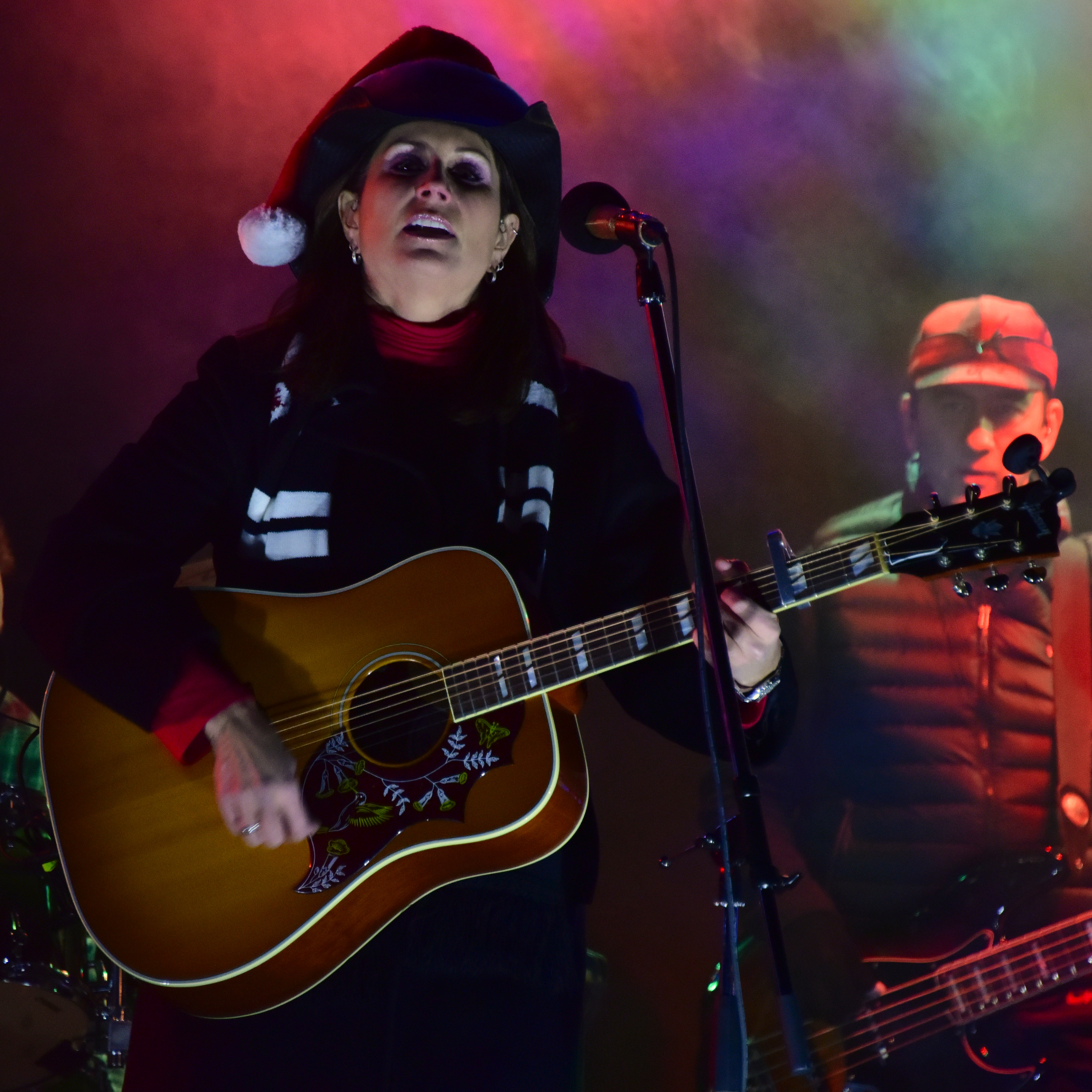
- Clark performing from the CP Holiday Train, December 9, 2017

Background information
- Born: Terri Lynn Sauson; August 5, 1968 (age 58); Montreal, Quebec, Canada
- Origin: Medicine Hat, Alberta, Canada
- Genre: Country
- Occupations: Singer, songwriter
- Instruments: Vocals, guitar
- Years active: 1994–present
- Labels: Mercury Nashville, BNA, BareTrack/Capitol Nashville/EMI Canada
- Website: Official website

Terri Lynn Sauson, known professionally as Terri Clark, CM (born August 5, 1968) is a Canadian country music singer who has had success in both Canada and the United States. Signed to Mercury Records in 1995, she released her self-titled debut that year. Both it and its two follow-ups, 1996's Just the Same and 1998's How I Feel, were certified platinum in both countries, and produced several Top Ten country hits.

Her fourth album, 2000's Fearless, though certified gold in Canada, was not as successful in the U.S., producing no Top 10 hits. Pain to Kill from 2003 restored her chart momentum in the U.S. with "I Just Wanna Be Mad" and "I Wanna Do It All", while a 2004 greatest hits album produced the Number One "Girls Lie Too". A non-album single, "The World Needs a Drink", and the 2005 album Life Goes On were her last releases for Mercury before she signed to BNA Records in 2007. There, she released the singles "Dirty Girl" and "In My Next Life". Although the latter went to Number One in Canada, she has not released an album for BNA.

Clark's albums have accounted for more than twenty singles, including six Number Ones. "If I Were You", "Poor Poor Pitiful Me", "Emotional Girl" and "In My Next Life" all topped the country charts in Canada (the former three were also U.S. Top Ten singles), "Girls Lie Too" reached number one only in the U.S., and "You're Easy on the Eyes" was number one in both countries.

In 2004, Clark gained one of country music's crowning achievements when she became a member of the Grand Ole Opry. She was inducted into the Canadian Country Music Hall of Fame in 2018 and became a member of the Canadian Music Hall of Fame in 2023. In 2024, Clark released a duets album Terri Clark: Take Two featuring re-recorded versions of her previous hits.

== Biography ==
=== Early life ===
Clark was born Terri Lynn Sauson on August 5, 1968, in Montreal, Quebec, Canada. Her family eventually settled in Medicine Hat, Alberta, where she was raised. She is the second of four children. Clark's grandparents, Ray and Betty Gauthier, were both noted Canadian country musicians, having opened for artists such as George Jones and Johnny Cash. Clark's mother, Linda, had belonged to the Canadian folk scene. Her parents divorced when she was young and her mother remarried, with Terri taking on her stepfather's last name.

By high school, Clark had grown to love country music and worked at a local Chinese restaurant to save money to move to Nashville, Tennessee. After graduating from Crescent Heights High School in 1986, she moved to Nashville where she got her start playing at Tootsie's Orchid Lounge, a honky-tonk bar across the alley from Nashville's iconic Ryman Auditorium. At that time, country music executives were largely uninterested in traditional country, but record producer and singer Keith Stegall gave Clark advice and encouragement to not give up. In 1994, Stegall became an executive at PolyGram/Mercury Records in Nashville and promptly signed Clark to a record deal.

=== 1995–1997: Terri Clark and Just the Same ===
In 1995, Clark issued her first single, "Better Things to Do." The song managed to reach the top five in both the United States and Canada. Her debut album, Terri Clark, followed shortly after. Clark had a hand in writing or co-writing 11 of the album's 12 tracks. Terri Clark also featured the singles "When Boy Meets Girl," "If I Were You," and "Suddenly Single." "If I Were You" became Clark's first No. 1 in Canada in June 1996. The album was certified Gold by the RIAA in the United States on April 5, 1996, and Platinum on July 29, 1997.

In 1996, Clark's second studio album, Just the Same, was issued following the album's first single, "Poor Poor Pitiful Me," a cover of the 1976 Warren Zevon song. The song and its second single, "Emotional Girl," reached number one in Canada with both songs reaching the top ten in the United States. During late 1996, Clark was awarded Single of the Year for "Better Things to Do" and Album of the Year for Terri Clark by the Canadian Country Music Association. By 1997 she would also be awarded the Fans' Choice Award, an award she would win six more times between 2001 and 2007, and Female Artist of the Year, and award she would also claim in 2004 and 2005.

In March 1998, Clark visited Calgary, Alberta, Canada to film her first television special, Terri Clark: Coming Home, which premiered March 27 on CBC in Canada. During the special Clark was visited by Canadian country singers Paul Brandt and George Fox.

=== 1998–2001: How I Feel and Fearless ===
Clark's third studio album, How I Feel, was issued in May 1998. The album's lead single, "Now That I Found You," reached the top five in both the United States and Canada. It was the album's second single, "You're Easy on the Eyes," that gave Clark's first American No. 1, the song also reached No. 1 in Canada. "You're Easy on the Eyes" became a minor Top 40 hit, peaking at No. 40 on the Billboard Hot 100 in the United States. To promote the new album, Clark was added as the opening act for Reba McEntire and Brooks & Dunn 1998 tour.

Fearless, Clark's fourth studio album, was issued in September 2000. During the album's production, Clark started writing more personal songs with a new team of co-writers and hired a new producer to deliver a set of songs with a more acoustic feel than that of her previous work. The album's first single, "A Little Gasoline", was a late addition to the album because Mercury executives felt Clark needed to balance her new material with something that had a more familiar feel to it. The song reached the top ten in Canada, however, only reaching No. 13 in the United States.

On May 2, 2001, Clark was pulled over by police for speeding in Nashville. The officer, who pulled Clark over, had suspected that she had consumed alcohol and asked her to do sobriety test, after which Clark refused and was charged with a DUI and implied consent. Clark later apologized for the incident through a statement that was issued to press by her publicist. In August, Clark pleaded guilty to a charge of reckless driving and was fined $350 plus court costs, placed on six months' supervised probation and ordered to take an alcohol education course.

=== 2002–2004: Pain to Kill and Greatest Hits 1994-2004 ===
After a management change in December 2001, Clark began work on her fifth studio album, Pain to Kill. The album was issued in January 2003, followed after the release of the album's first single, "I Just Wanna Be Mad". The song, written by Kelley Lovelace and Lee Thomas Miller, was initially intended to be recorded by Sara Evans, who passed on it. When released as a single the song became Clark's highest-charting single in the United States since 1998's "You're Easy on the Eyes" and is to date Clark's highest appearance on the U.S. Billboard Hot 100, peaking at No. 27. The album marked the first time Clark had worked with producer Byron Gallimore, who produced the first half of the album. The other half was produced by Clark's longtime producer Keith Stegall, who was brought in when Gallimore became unavailable.

In early 2004, Clark was approached by Playboy magazine to pose—clothed—for the cover of the magazine's upcoming May issue. Clark, who came in second place behind fellow Canadian country singer Shania Twain in a poll in the previous year, turned down the offer saying "I think of all the young girls who come to my shows, I think of those faces, I think of my mother, and I worry about the signal [sex] sends to them[…] If I’m sexy enough for Playboy to want me with my clothes on, then I hope the message can be that sexy is about what’s between your ears, in your heart and your smile."

On May 15, 2004, during a performance of the Grand Ole Opry, Clark was surprised by Steve Wariner and her mother Linda with an invitation to join the Grand Ole Opry. Clark was officially inducted on June 12, 2004, and is currently the only female Canadian member of the Grand Ole Opry. Shortly after her induction, Clark's first greatest hits album, Greatest Hits 1994–2004, was issued. The album's only single, "Girls Lie Too", became Clark's first number one in the United States since 1998's "You're Easy on the Eyes". While the song did not reach number one in Canada, it was the named number one country song of 2004 in Canada by Radio & Records. A non-album single, "The World Needs a Drink" (which was co-written by a then-unknown Eric Church), was released in late 2004, but was not included on any of Clark's studio albums.

=== 2005–2010: Life Goes On and The Long Way Home ===
In 2005, Clark's sixth studio album, Life Goes On, was issued in November. The album's first single, "She Didn't Have Time", only managed to reach No. 25 in the United States and No. 15 in Canada. None of the album's other singles charted in the United States and Clark parted ways with Mercury Records in March 2006.

In June 2006, Clark signed with BNA Records, a division of Sony BMG label group, now known as Sony Music Entertainment. Clark's first single for the label, "Dirty Girl", was issued in early 2007. The song was then followed by "In My Next Life", which was to be the title track to her debut BNA release. Clark, along with Canadian country band Emerson Drive, opened for Big & Rich in Canada, hoping to promote the new album. The album was scheduled for an August 7, 2007 release. My Next Life was delayed several times and remained unreleased leaving Clark to part ways with BNA in November 2008, so she could concentrate more on her career in Canada and possibly launch her own record label.

Clark released a live album, Terri Clark Live: Road Rage, via Clark's own BareTrack Records label in July 2009 through digital retailers. Clark's seventh studio album, The Long Way Home, was released shortly after to all retailers in Canada and digital retailers in the United States on September 1, 2009, via BareTrack/Capitol Nashville/EMI Canada. The album was released to non-digital retailers in the United States on October 20, 2009.

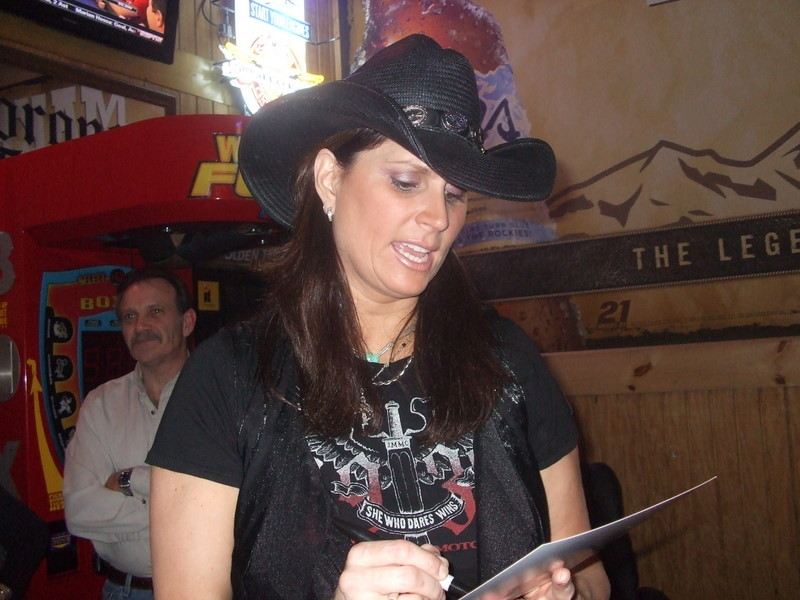
Signing autographs in February 2010

The first single issued from the album was "Gypsy Boots", a song previously recorded for Clark's unreleased My Next Life album. The single was released to country radio in Canada on June 22, 2009, and country radio in the United States on July 20. The video for "Gypsy Boots," directed by Margaret Malandruccolo, was released in Canada on August 6, 2009, and is available for online viewing at Clark's site. "If You Want Fire", "A Million Ways To Run" and "You Tell Me" have been issued as follow up singles in Canada.

=== 2011–2013: Roots and Wings and Classic ===
Clark released her eighth studio album, Roots and Wings, on July 26, 2011. It includes "Smile", a song she wrote for her mom after her death due to a long battle with cancer. The album's lead off single, "Northern Girl," was released on April 18, 2011. "We're Here for a Good Time," "The One," and "Wrecking Ball," were all also released as singles from the album.

Clark's ninth studio album, Classic, was released on November 13, 2012, in Canada. The album includes classic country standards such as "Love Is a Rose", which was issued as the album's lead single, and features duets with Reba McEntire, Jann Arden, Dierks Bentley, Tanya Tucker and Dean Brody.

=== 2014–present: Some Songs, Raising the Bar, and Take Two ===
Clark's tenth studio album, Some Songs, was produced by Michael Knox. It was released on September 2, 2014, and includes ten songs. The album was funded through PledgeMusic and was distributed by Clark's own BareTrack Records and Universal Music Canada. The album's first single, "Some Songs", shipped to Canadian country radio on May 26.

Clark previously co-hosted America's Morning Show on Nash FM with Blair Garner and Chuck Wicks.

As of the April 9/10 weekend in 2016, Terri became the new hostess of the Saturday night classic country program Country Gold, replacing Randy Owen. Clark will depart the show August 31, 2024.

In 2018, Clark was inducted into the Canadian Country Music Hall of Fame. Clark's eleventh studio album, Raising the Bar, was released on September 14, 2018.

Clark's first holiday album, "It's Christmas...Cheers!" was released on September 25, 2020, by Mercury Nashville.

On March 14, 2023, Clark announced that she was to become the newest inductee into the Canadian Music Hall of Fame.

On March 29, 2024, it was announced that Clark had recorded a new album, which was released on May 31. Titled Terri Clark: Take Two, the album features a collection of Clark's past hits recorded as duets with modern day country artists and others, including Kelly Clarkson, Lainey Wilson, and Paul Brandt. The first single was a new version of "Better Things to Do" with Clark's close friend Ashley McBryde.

Clark's live album, Live At The Ryman, was released on October 29, 2026.

== Personal life ==
Clark married fiddle player Ted Stevenson in 1991. The couple filed for divorce in 1996.

Clark married her tour manager Greg Kaczor on September 17, 2005. The couple's wedding was documented on In the Moment, a TV series broadcast on CMT in December 2005. The couple filed for divorce on February 16, 2007.

She was made a Member of the Order of Canada on December 31, 2025.

== Discography ==
Studio albums

- Terri Clark (1995)
- Just the Same (1996)
- How I Feel (1998)
- Fearless (2000)
- Pain to Kill (2003)
- Life Goes On (2005)
- The Long Way Home (2009)
- Roots and Wings (2011)
- Classic (2012)
- Some Songs (2014)
- Raising the Bar (2018)
- It's Christmas...Cheers! (2020)
- Take Two (2024)

== Awards and nominations ==
Year	Association	Category	Nominated work / Recipient	Result
1995	Academy of Country Music Awards	Top New Female Vocalist	Terri Clark	Nominated
1996	Grammy Awards	Best Country Collaboration with Vocals	Hope: Country Music's Quest For A Cure	Nominated
1996	Country Music Association Awards	Horizon Award	Terri Clark	Nominated
1997	Country Music Association Awards	Horizon Award	Terri Clark	Nominated
1997	Juno Awards	Best New Solo Artist	Terri Clark	Won
1997	Juno Awards	Best Country Female Artist	Terri Clark	Nominated
2001	Juno Awards	Best Country Female Artist	Terri Clark	Won
2002	Academy of Country Music Awards	Top Female Vocalist	Terri Clark	Nominated
2003	Academy of Country Music Awards	Top Female Vocalist	Terri Clark	Nominated
2003	Country Music Association Awards	Female Vocalist of the Year	Terri Clark	Nominated
2004	Country Music Association Awards	Female Vocalist of the Year	Terri Clark	Nominated
2004	Country Music Association Awards	President's Award	Terri Clark	Won
2004	Academy of Country Music Awards	Top Female Vocalist	Terri Clark	Nominated
2004	Academy of Country Music Awards	Video of the Year	Girls Lie Too	Nominated
2012	Juno Awards	Country Album of the Year	Roots and Wings	Won
2017	Country Music Association Awards	National Broadcast Personality of the Year	Terri Clark - Country Gold	Nominated
2018	Academy of Country Music Awards	National Broadcast Personality of the Year	Terri Clark - Country Gold	Nominated
2021	Country Music Association Awards	National Broadcast Personality of the Year	Terri Clark - Country Gold	Nominated
2023	Canadian Country Music Association	Musical Collaboration of the Year	"I Ain't Drunk" (with Gord Bamford)	Nominated
2024	Country Music Association Awards	National Broadcast Personality of the Year	Terri Clark - Country Gold	Pending

=== Other honors ===
- Grand Ole Opry: inducted in 2004
- Canadian Country Music Hall of Fame: inducted in 2018
- Canadian Music Hall of Fame: inducted in 2023
