= Mojave =

Mojave or Mohave most often refers to:

- Mojave Desert
- Mojave River
- Mohave people
- Mojave language

Mojave or Mohave may also refer to:

== Places ==
- Fort Mojave Indian Reservation
- Mohave County, Arizona
- Mohave Valley, geologic feature in northwest Arizona
- Mohave Valley, Arizona, a town
- Fort Mohave, Arizona, a town
- Fort Mohave, an Army installation active 1859–1890 in Arizona
- Mojave, California, a town
- Mojave County, California, proposed in 1988
- Mojave National Preserve, in the California desert
- Lake Mojave, a prehistoric body of water
- Mojave (crater), an impact feature on Mars

== Music ==
- Mojave (band), a Canadian acoustic and folk band
- Mojave (album), an album by Concrete Blonde
- "Mojave", a song by the Afro Celt Sound System from Volume 5: Anatomic
- "Mojave", a song by Antônio Carlos Jobim from his 1967 album Wave

== Transportation ==
- Mojave Road
- Mojave Air and Space Port
- Sikorsky CH-37 Mojave, a type of helicopter
- Kia Mohave, a sport-utility vehicle
- Piper PA-31 Mojave, a piston engine airplane
- General Atomics Mojave, an unmanned aerial vehicle under development

== Other uses ==
- Mojave (film), 2015 crime thriller
- macOS Mojave, a 2018 software release for Apple computers
- Mojave rattlesnake
- Mojave Experiment, an advertising campaign by Microsoft
- Mojave High School, North Las Vegas, Nevada
- Mohave War, 1858–1859

== See also ==
- Mojave 3, a British band
- Mojave Solar Project, a solar power plant in California, United States
