= Warren Zevon on the Late Show with David Letterman in 2002 =

Warren Zevon's final public appearance

External videos
- Warren Zevon's Final "Late Show" Appearance via Letterman/YouTube (23:21)

Warren Zevon's final appearance on the Late Show with David Letterman, October 30, 2002

Shortly after being diagnosed with terminal mesothelioma, American singer-songwriter Warren Zevon made his final public appearance on the late-night talk show Late Show with David Letterman on October 30, 2002. Zevon, who had regularly appeared on the show over the preceding decade, was unusually given the majority of the episode to talk with Letterman and perform three songs. The episode is remembered for the humor that Zevon used throughout the interview, as well as his quip that his terminal diagnosis was a reminder to "enjoy every sandwich".

== Background ==
Comedian David Letterman began the late-night NBC Late Night franchise in 1982, and his favorite musician was Warren Zevon. He started following Zevon in 1981 because he was, in Letterman's words, "crazy and fascinating". Zevon would start appearing on his Late Night show on a semi-annual basis for a time.

Letterman brought Zevon onto his subsequent CBS Late Show with David Letterman throughout the 1990s despite Zevon's lack of commercial success during that time. He even served as the show's substitute band leader during Paul Shaffer's absences. In gratitude, Zevon gave Letterman a bit part on Zevon's album My Ride's Here. He later told Letterman that he had "been the best friend my music has ever had". Of the relationship between the two, Detroit Free Press columnist Terry Lawson would later write:

Zevon is a Letterman favorite [...] because they share the same cranky humor, the same appreciation of ironic absurdity; Letterman probably could have written "Werewolves of London", and Zevon could have hosted a talk show, if he didn't have to dress up or endure simpleton movie stars.

In August 2002, a few months before the release of Genius: The Best of Warren Zevon, Zevon received a terminal diagnosis of lung cancer (pleural mesothelioma). He revealed this to the public a month later.

== Episode ==
=== Prelude ===
The Late Show invited Zevon to appear on an episode that would air on the night of October 30, 2002. In keeping with established US late-night talk show conventions, Late Show typically booked two guests and a musical act. For this episode, which would almost certainly be Zevon's final appearance, the Late Show's producers proposed to Letterman that they break with that approach and devote the entire episode to Zevon. Letterman immediately endorsed the idea, and when aired the only parts of the episode that did not feature Zevon were a traditional opening monologue and the recurring Top Ten List comedy segment.

Prior to recording, Zevon pushed Letterman to prioritize humor over awkward questions. Audience members were specifically instructed to avoid sympathetic reactions like "aww" if they heard sad news.

=== Taping ===
Letterman opened the show with a lengthy monologue that spoke to Zevon's influence on Letterman over the years, including the musician's extensive history with the show. Late Show band leader Paul Shaffer added occasional interjections.

When Zevon came to the stage for the interview segment of the show, he began things by accompanying his grim prognosis with humor:

- Letterman opened by noting that "a couple of months ago we all learned that your life has changed radically". Zevon responded "you mean you heard about the flu?"
- Zevon said that he had erred in not visiting a doctor for about two decades, and it turned out to be "one of those phobias that really didn't pay off"
- Zevon told Letterman that he should not be "fooled by cosmetics" when it came to his healthy appearance

Later in the episode, the conversation turned serious when Letterman asked Zevon about the differences in recording music before and after his cancer diagnosis. Zevon responded that "you're reminded to enjoy every sandwich and every minute playing with the guys, and being with the kids." It was a line that The Forward would later call "iconic" and The Ringer said was Zevon's "most famous piece of advice".

Zevon closed the Late Show that night by performing three songs from across his career:

- "Mutineer", the title track off his 1995 album
- "Genius", from his 2002 album My Ride's Here; it was also used as the title for the greatest hits album that Zevon was ostensibly promoting that night
- "Roland the Headless Thompson Gunner", from his 1978 album Excitable Boy

After the final note, Letterman strolled over to Zevon, shook his hand, and told him to "enjoy every sandwich". The moment would be Zevon's final public appearance.

When the cameras stopped rolling, Letterman made what was for him an unusual decision to visit his guest's dressing room. The two made small talk while Zevon packed up his guitar, one he had previously used on the show. He surprised the host by gifting him the guitar, asking only that he take care of it. It was a request that caused Letterman to burst into tears.

== Legacy ==
Zevon's Late Show episode has garnered spots on several ranked lists over the years. Two months after the show aired, Rolling Stone's David Fricke placed his performance of "Roland the Headless Thompson Gunner" third in their list of top music moments in the year. Fricke wrote that Zevon had "put everything he had into the song". The same outlet ranked the episode as one of the best late-night TV moments from 2002–2013 and, separately, at number five on a list of most profound moments in the Late Show with David Letterman's history. Salon called it the "most heartbreaking" Late Show to have aired during Letterman's tenure.

In a longer retrospective, Uncut magazine said that the interview gave "the impression [that Zevon was] wise-cracking his way to the grave". Zevon's son added that his performance "was the role he was preparing to play all his life ... it gave him the chance to be like one of his tough-guy heroes" despite the toll of his medications and mental health. William Breitbart, a psychiatrist and Zevon fan, would later write an editorial about the lessons people could learn from the musician's response to his impending death. He said that Zevon "made the last days of his life meaningful and he made his death meaningful."

For Letterman, the Late Show episode lingered in his mind well after it aired. He brought up Zevon's "enjoy every sandwich" quip in a January 2003 interview with The New York Times Magazine: "Here's a guy looking right down the barrel of the gun. And if a guy wanted to indulge himself in great hyperbole in that circumstance, who wouldn't forgive him? But that was perfect, the simplicity of that. If this guy is not a poet, who is?" About two decades later, Vulture asked Letterman what the episode had "taught you about the human experience":

It was firsthand verification that the human mechanism can exist in any form imaginable. Here's a guy dying, and he's on a late-night talk show—not talking not about his flight in from Los Angeles or his dog. He's talking about the end of his life. I'd never seen an example of a guy, a person, go, "Hi, I'm here." "So what's new?" "Well, I'm dying." I mean, the human spirit is infinite. It was confirmation of that for me.

It had never happened to me before where I realized, Oh, our next guest only has a few days to live. I felt completely unprepared. Here's a guy I had known for two decades, but I was completely unprepared for the context of this. The minute it was finished, I wish I had done a better job. That haunts me to this day. I have not watched it since. Maybe if I saw it now I would feel differently about it. But at the time, I felt that I did not do a proper job for him. Those are the two things I remember. And then upstairs, after the show, he gave me his guitar, and I just started sobbing uncontrollably. I may start sobbing now. It's a cinematic story of him packing up his guitar and handing it to me in the dressing room. If the interview is poignant, it's because of Warren. I can't watch it again. I just felt like, This man, how much time does he have left? He decided he would come and be on our TV show. That suggests a responsibility that's nearly insurmountable.

Zevon died on September 7, 2003, outliving his original prognosis by ten months. "Enjoy every sandwich" was later used as the title for a posthumous Zevon tribute album. The quote has also been widely referenced in a variety of contexts, including people facing their own bouts with cancer and when celebrities handle with a publicly known terminal diagnosis.

=== Rock and Roll Hall of Fame induction ===
Fifteen years after Zevon's death, Letterman lobbied the Rock and Roll Hall of Fame to induct Zevon. Zevon was added to the hall's voting ballot in 2023, and elected in 2025 in the Musical Influence Award category. Letterman headlined Zevon's induction ceremony. The guitar Zevon played on his final performance on Letterman's show, the one Zevon gifted Letterman, was given to guitarist Dave Keuning of The Killers for a cover of "Lawyers, Guns and Money."
