= Dick's Picks Volume 25 =

Live album by Grateful Dead
- Released: July 20, 2002
- Recorded: May 10 and May 11, 1978
- Genre: Rock
- Length: 309:53
- Label: Grateful Dead

Grateful Dead chronology
Postcards of the Hanging (2002)	Dick's Picks Volume 25 (2002)	Steppin' Out with the Grateful Dead: England '72 (2002)

Dick's Picks Volume 25 is a four-CD live album by the rock band the Grateful Dead. It was recorded on May 10, 1978 at Veteran's Memorial Coliseum in New Haven, Connecticut and on May 11, 1978 at the Springfield Civic Center Arena in Springfield, Massachusetts. It was released on July 20, 2002.

Dick's Picks Volume 25 was the first Grateful Dead album to include a cover version of the Warren Zevon song "Werewolves of London".

== Enclosure ==
The album includes an eight-page booklet. The first two pages on the inside feature a collage of three images: a large black-and-white photograph of Jerry Garcia, Mickey Hart and Bill Kreutzmann, a small photograph of some sound equipment, and a small, colorful drawing of a three-dimensional checkerboard motif with stars on top and musical notes at the bottom surrounding a red and blue heart with a white lightning bolt in the center. The middle two pages contain a color photograph by Jim Anderson of the entire band on stage, and the last two pages list the contents of and credits for the release, along with a large black-and-white photo of the band on stage.

== Caveat emptor ==
Each volume of Dick's Picks has its own "caveat emptor" label, advising the listener of the sound quality of the recording. The one for Volume 25 reads: "Dick's Picks 25 was mastered from the original analog 2-track tapes, recorded live at 7.5 ips and 15 ips, and may exhibit some minor effects of the ravages of time. However, the music contained on these four discs is quite remarkable, and by far makes up for any slight anomalies in the recording. Enjoy."

== Critical reception ==
Professional ratings
Review scores
Source	Rating
AllMusic	3/5 stars
The Music Box	4/5 stars
Rolling Stone	4/5 stars

On AllMusic, Lindsay Planer said, "Luckily, tape archivist David Lemieux chose not only two of the better shows from [1978], but also a pair that had not fallen prey to international CD bootleggers or otherwise been widely liberated into tapers' circles.... Easily discernible are the jazz-influenced elements that musically motivated and seamlessly pair older tunes such as "Scarlet Begonias" and "Eyes of the World" with more recent material such as "Fire on the Mountain" or "Estimated Prophet", respectively."

In The Music Box, John Metzger wrote, "There must have been something funny in the air – or perhaps the backstage punch bowl – for the Grateful Dead's performances on May 10–11, 1978. The band members were all a little more playful than usual on each of these consecutive nights in New England, and the music – most of which is contained on the 25th edition of the Dick's Picks series – ran the gamut from strangely sloppy to fiercely fervent.... In other words, Dick's Picks, Volume 25 showcases the fine line between chaos and structure that the Grateful Dead so often tread."

== Track listing ==
Dick's Picks Volume 25 contains most of both concerts. Not included from the May 10 show at the New Haven Coliseum are "It Must Have Been the Roses" and "U.S. Blues". Omitted from the May 11 show at the Springfield Civic Center are "Mexicali Blues", "Mama Tried", and "Peggy-O".

Disc one

May 10, 1978 – first set:

1. "Jack Straw" (Bob Weir, Robert Hunter) – 6:51
2. "They Love Each Other" (Jerry Garcia, Hunter) – 7:45
3. "Cassidy" (Weir, John Perry Barlow) – 5:22
4. "Ramble on Rose" (Garcia, Hunter) – 7:00
5. "Me and My Uncle" (John Phillips) – 3:00 →
6. "Big River" (Johnny Cash) – 6:56
7. "Peggy-O" (traditional, arranged by Grateful Dead) – 7:52
8. "Let It Grow" (Weir, Barlow) – 9:40 →
9. "Deal" (Garcia, Hunter) – 7:05

May 10, 1978 – second set:

10. "Bertha" (Garcia, Hunter) – 8:07 →
11. "Good Lovin' " (Rudy Clark, Artie Resnick) – 6:20

Disc two

1. "Estimated Prophet" (Weir, Barlow) – 12:04 →
2. "Eyes of the World" (Garcia, Hunter) – 12:18 →
3. "Drums" (Mickey Hart, Bill Kreutzmann) – 18:00 →
4. "The Other One" (Weir, Kreutzmann) – 16:31 →
5. "Wharf Rat" (Garcia, Hunter) – 10:14 →
6. "Sugar Magnolia" (Weir, Hunter) – 9:33

Disc three

May 11, 1978 – first set:

1. "Cold Rain and Snow" (traditional, arranged by Grateful Dead) – 7:03
2. "Beat It On Down the Line" (Jesse Fuller) – 3:31
3. "Friend of the Devil" (Garcia, John Dawson, Hunter) – 8:36
4. "Looks Like Rain" (Weir, Barlow) – 9:13
5. "Loser" (Garcia, Hunter) – 7:48
6. "New Minglewood Blues" (traditional, arranged by Weir) – 5:47
7. "Tennessee Jed" (Garcia, Hunter) – 8:47
8. "Lazy Lightnin' " (Weir, Barlow) – 3:21 →
9. "Supplication" (Weir, Barlow) – 6:31

May 11, 1978 – second set:

10. "Scarlet Begonias" (Garcia, Hunter) – 9:41 →
11. "Fire on the Mountain" (Hart, Hunter) – 8:35

Disc four

1. "Dancing in the Streets" (William "Mickey" Stevenson, Marvin Gaye, Ivy Jo Hunter) – 15:12 →
2. "Drums" (Hart, Kreutzmann) – 19:53 →
3. "Not Fade Away" (Buddy Holly, Norman Petty) – 10:21 →
4. "Stella Blue" (Garcia, Hunter) – 8:56 →
5. "Around and Around" (Chuck Berry) – 9:15

May 11, 1978 – encore:

6. "Werewolves of London" (LeRoy Marinell, Waddy Wachtel, Warren Zevon) – 8:30
7. "Johnny B. Goode" (Berry) – 4:15

== Personnel ==
Grateful Dead

- Jerry Garcia – lead guitar, vocals
- Bob Weir – rhythm guitar, vocals
- Phil Lesh – electric bass, vocals
- Keith Godchaux – piano
- Donna Jean Godchaux – vocals
- Mickey Hart – drums
- Bill Kreutzmann – drums

Production

- Owsley Stanley – recording (New Haven)
- Betty Cantor-Jackson – recording (Springfield)
- Jeffrey Norman – mastering
- Dick Latvala – tape archivist
- David Lemieux – tape archivist
- Eileen Law – archival research
- Jim Anderson – photography
- Robert Minkin – package design, photography
