= Incredible! Kaleidoscope =

Studio album by The Kaleidoscope
- Released: June 1969
- Recorded: 1968, 1969
- Genre: Folk, psychedelic rock, country, Arabic
- Length: 30:39
- Label: Epic
- Producer: Jackie Mills

The Kaleidoscope chronology
A Beacon from Mars (1968)	Incredible! Kaleidoscope (1969)	Bernice (1970)

Professional ratings
Review scores
Source	Rating
Allmusic	4/5 stars
Rolling Stone	(favorable)

Incredible! Kaleidoscope is Kaleidoscope's third album. The line-up had changed, with original bassist Chris Darrow and drummer John Vidican replaced by Stuart Brotman and Paul Lagos. It was the only Kaleidoscope album to chart, reaching number 139 on Billboard, and it's still remembered fondly by members of the band, especially David Lindley.

== Track listing ==
No.	Title	Writer(s)	Length
1.	"Lie to Me"	Lindley, Feldthouse, Brotman, Lagos, Parcely	2:47
2.	"Let the Good Love Flow"	Smith, Lindley	2:11
3.	"Killing Floor (aka Tempe Arizona)"	Chester Burnett	2:44
4.	"Petite Fleur"	Lindley, Feldthouse, Brotman, Lagos, Parcely	3:31
5.	"Banjo"	Lindley	3:34
6.	"Cuckoo"	Traditional; arranged by Kaleidoscope	4:16
7.	"Seven-Ate Sweet"	Lindley, Feldthouse, Brotman, Lagos, Parcely	11:31

== Personnel ==
- David Lindley – guitar, banjo, fiddle, mandolin
- Stuart Brotman – bass, vocals
- Solomon Feldthouse – vocals, saz, bouzouki, oud, dulcimer, guitar, jumbus
- Chester Crill (as Templeton Parcely) – violin, organ, vocals; also (appearing as "special guest Max Buda") harmonica
- Paul Lagos – drums, percussion, vocals
