= Enjoy Every Sandwich: The Songs of Warren Zevon =

Compilation album / tribute album by various artists
- Released: October 19, 2004
- Recorded: September 10, 2003 – June 14, 2004
- Genre: Rock
- Length: 57:01
- Label: Artemis
- Producers: Jorge Calderón, Evan Frankfort, Brendan O'Brien, Ken Stringfellow, Twangtrust, and Waddy Wachtel

Professional ratings
Review scores
Source	Rating
AllMusic	3.5/5 stars
Rolling Stone	3/5 stars

Enjoy Every Sandwich: The Songs of Warren Zevon, released in 2004, is a tribute album to the late Warren Zevon by several well-known musicians. It includes a previously unreleased Zevon composition: "Studebaker", sung by Warren's son Jordan Zevon.

The album's title comes from an interview Zevon did on the Late Show with David Letterman following Zevon's having been diagnosed with terminal pleural mesothelioma. Zevon's reflections on enjoying what time you have included the phrase "enjoy every sandwich".

== Track listing ==
All songs written by Warren Zevon, except where noted.

1. Don Henley – "Searching for a Heart" – 4:05
2. Adam Sandler – "Werewolves of London" (Zevon, LeRoy Marinell, Waddy Wachtel) – 4:01
3. Steve Earle with Reckless Kelly – "Reconsider Me" – 2:35
4. Jackson Browne with Bonnie Raitt – "Poor Poor Pitiful Me" – 4:05
5. Bruce Springsteen – "My Ride's Here" (live) (Zevon, Paul Muldoon) – 4:36
6. The Wallflowers – "Lawyers, Guns and Money" – 3:14
7. Jordan Zevon – "Studebaker" – 4:03
8. Billy Bob Thornton – "The Wind" (Zevon, Jorge Calderón) – 4:07
9. Pete Yorn – "Splendid Isolation" – 3:27
10. Bob Dylan – "Mutineer" (live) – 3:10
11. David Lindley and Ry Cooder – "Monkey Wash Donkey Rinse" (Zevon, Duncan Aldrich) – 3:19
12. Jill Sobule – "Don't Let Us Get Sick" – 2:38
13. Pixies – "Ain't That Pretty at All" (Zevon, Marinell) – 3:53
14. Jorge Calderón with Jennifer Warnes – "Keep Me in Your Heart" (Zevon, Calderón) – 4:54
15. Van Dyke Parks (arranger) – "Keep Me in Your Heart" (strings only) – 4:54

== Production credits ==
- Jorge Calderón – Tracks 1, 8, 11, and 14
- Jorge Calderón and Waddy Wachtel – Tracks 2 and 4
- twangtrust (Steve Earle and Ray Kennedy) – Track 3
- Brendan O'Brien – Track 6
- Evan Frankfort – Tracks 7 and 9
- Ken Stringfellow – Track 12
- Pixies – Track 13
