= Win This Record! =

Studio album by David Lindley
- Released: 1982
- Label: Asylum
- Producer: David Lindley, Greg Ladanyi

David Lindley chronology
El Rayo-X (1981)	Win This Record! (1982)	El Rayo Live (1983)

Win This Record! is an album by the American musician David Lindley, released in 1982. He is credited with his band, El Rayo-X. It was a commercial disappointment, and his final album for Asylum Records.

== Production ==
The album was produced by Lindley and Greg Ladanyi. Lindley tried to avoid adding too many additional musical ideas to his original conceptions of the songs. As with other albums, Lindley used cheap guitars and parts and instruments he found in junk shops. Booker T. Jones guested on organ. "Something's Got a Hold on Me" is a cover of the Etta James song. "Ram-a-Lamb-a Man" is a tribute to condoms. "Premature" is a cover of the Toots and the Maytals song.

== Critical reception ==
Professional ratings
Review scores
Source	Rating
AllMusic	4/5 stars
The Clarion-Ledger	4/4 stars
MusicHound Rock: The Essential Album Guide	4/5 stars
The Philadelphia Inquirer	5/5 stars
The Rolling Stone Album Guide	3/5 stars

The Globe and Mail wrote: "Lindley's brand of California reggae grows stronger with each listening. The rhythms are amazing, and his guitarwork first class." The Sun Sentinel called the album "filled with upbeat, gritty and reggae-flavored covers and originals," writing that "Talk to the Lawyer" "should have been a hit." Billboard deemed it "another exercise in classic rock and reggae/pop." The Philadelphia Inquirer noted that "the lyrics are more acute and the playing has a bristling energy that belies the laid-back tempo of most of the songs." The Commercial Appeal considered it "a carefully careless rendering of music rooted in the four corners of the world."

AllMusic stated: "A rambling, fun record, Win This Record is one of the finest rock records of the '80s." The State labeled the album "innovative rock 'n' reggae." The Palm Beach Post listed Win This Record! among the 13 "great records you may have missed in the '80s," writing that Lindley is "a musical virtuoso who can play anything with strings." The San Diego Union-Tribune also considered the album to be among the best of the 1980s.

== Track listing ==
No.	Title	Length
1.	"Something's Got a Hold on Me"	2:43
2.	"Turning Point"	4:45
3.	"Spodie"	4:57
4.	"Brother John"	5:50
5.	"Premature"	3:57
6.	"Talk to the Lawyer"	4:55
7.	"Make It on Time"	3:17
8.	"Rock It with I"	5:06
9.	"Ram-a-Lamb-a Man"	4:10
10.	"Look So Good"	1:31
