= Very Greasy =

Studio album by David Lindley & El Rayo-X
- Released: 1988
- Label: Elektra
- Producer: Linda Ronstadt

David Lindley & El Rayo-X chronology
El Rayo Live (1983)	Very Greasy (1988)

Very Greasy is an album by the American musician David Lindley, with El Rayo-X, released in 1988. It was Lindley's third studio album with the band.

The album peaked at No. 174 on the Billboard 200. Lindley supported it by touring with the Wagoneers, before serving as the opening act on Jackson Browne's 1989 tour.

== Production ==
The album was produced by Linda Ronstadt, who was alarmed that Lindley had been dropped by Warner Bros. Records; Ronstadt and Lindley are distant cousins. Lindley played a bouzouki on "Talkin' to the Wino Too". "Gimme Da'Ting" is a cover of the Lord Kitchener song.

== Critical reception ==
Professional ratings
Review scores
Source	Rating
AllMusic	3/5 stars
The Encyclopedia of Popular Music	2/5 stars
Houston Chronicle	3/5 stars
MusicHound Rock: The Essential Album Guide	4/5 stars
The Rolling Stone Album Guide	3/5 stars

The Chicago Tribune praised the "refreshing rhythmic sensibility that handily encompasses ska, Tex-Mex, highlife and other lively world styles." The Washington Post opined that, "best of all is a ska version of Warren Zevon's 'Werewolves of London', which digresses into a discussion of the grease content in Lindley's own hair." The San Francisco Chronicle concluded that "this fine, frothy blend of polyethnic rock stylings plays like a wacked-out dream, madly mixing African, reggae and rock music on a variety of oddball choices."

The Toronto Star determined that, "on one hand Lindley's music is iconoclastic with respect to certain shaky pop conventions, and on the other resonant and deferential to the traditions that remain close to his heart." The St. Petersburg Times deemed Very Greasy "party music on the verge of going out of control, but only superficially, because underneath everything is nailed down tight." The Houston Chronicle called it "a spotty, if charming, series of jokes."

AllMusic wrote that Lindley "and his cohorts explore a myriad of lighter, more Caribbean rhythms and textures, rendering a very pleasing album." MusicHound Rock: The Essential Album Guide considered the cover of "Papa Was a Rolling Stone" to be the "funkiest [tune] in the Lindley canon."

== Track listing ==
No.	Title	Length
1.	"Gimme Da'Ting"
2.	"I Just Can't Work No Longer"
3.	"Do You Wanna Dance?"
4.	"Talk About You"
5.	"Papa Was a Rolling Stone"
6.	"Werewolves of London"
7.	"Texas Tango"
8.	"Never Knew Her"
9.	"Talkin' to the Wino Too"
10.	"Tiki Torches at Twilight"
