= Side Trips =

Studio album by The Kaleidoscope
- Released: May 1967
- Recorded: November–December 1966
- Genre: Psychedelic rock, folk-rock, Arabic
- Label: Epic
- Producer: Barry Friedman

The Kaleidoscope chronology
Side Trips (1967)	A Beacon from Mars (1967)

Side Trips is the debut studio album by American band Kaleidoscope. It was released in May 1967, on Epic Records BN 26304, and re-released on vinyl by Sundazed Music (2007). The album has a raw, non-limited instrumental mentality, for each member played many instruments; for example, David Lindley played guitar, banjo, fiddle, and mandolin, and Solomon Feldthouse played saz, bouzouki, dobro, vina, oud, doumbek, dulcimer, fiddle, guitar, and vocals.

== Background ==
After forming in 1966, the group known then as The Kaleidoscope won a recording contract with Epic Records. Their first single "Please", backed by the non-album track "Elevator Man", was released in December 1966. The album Side Trips was released in May, followed in August by the album cut "Why Try" backed by non-album track "Little Orphan Nannie". The album combined rock & roll with roots and world music along with several traditional songs including Charlie Poole's "Hesitation Blues" and Cab Calloway's signature song "Minnie the Moocher". Bassist Chris Darrow contributed a couple of psychedelic numbers, "If the Night" and "Keep Your Mind Open", while Solomon Feldthouse penned the Middle Eastern influenced "Egyptian Gardens". Soon after the release, they renamed themselves as simply Kaleidoscope.

== Music ==
BrooklynVegan described the sound as "rock and roll and standards mixed with world music." Some of the melodies have been described as sounding Eastern. The album incorporates unorthodox instruments such as bouzouki. The song "Please" has been described as "Byrdsian light country folk," with some sections also drawing comparisons to The Velvet Underground's "Sunday Morning."

== Reception and legacy ==
Professional ratings
Review scores
Source	Rating
Allmusic	4/5 stars

Allmusic's retrospective review praised nearly all of the individual songs and called the album "arguably the most diverse effort of 1967", but concluded that enthusiasts and collectors would be better off getting the more comprehensive Pulsating Dreams anthology, which includes the entirety of Side Trips.

BrooklynVegan said: "It is a record that sounds like nothing else from this period and even today still delights in its melting pot of sounds."

== Track listing ==
1. "Egyptian Gardens" (Solomon Feldthouse) – 3:08
2. "If the Night" (Chris Darrow) – 1:51
3. "Hesitation Blues" (Charlie Poole) – 2:27
4. "Please" (Feldthouse, Mark Freedman) – 3:18
5. "Keep Your Mind Open" (Darrow) – 1:56
6. "Pulsating Dream" (Darrow, Feldthouse, David Lindley) – 2:16
7. "Oh Death" (Dock Boggs) – 3:25
8. "Come on In" (Traditional, arranged by David Lindley) – 2:07
9. "Why Try" (Lindley) – 3:39
10. "Minnie the Moocher" (Cab Calloway, Clarence Gaskill, Irving Mills) – 2:15

== Personnel ==
=== Musicians ===
- David Perry Lindley – banjo, fiddle, mandolin, guitar, harp guitar, 7-string banjo
- David Solomon Feldthouse – saz, bouzouki, resonator guitar, veena, goblet drum, dulcimer, fiddle, twelve-string guitar
- Chris Darrow – bass, banjo, mandolin, fiddle, autoharp, harmonica, clarinet
- Fenrus Epp – violin, viola, bass, piano, organ, harmonica
- John Vidican – percussion

=== Technical ===
- Barry Friedman – producer
- Mike Goldberg – production supervisor
- Arnold Shaw – liner notes
