= El Rayo-X =

Studio album by David Lindley
- Released: April 1981
- Recorded: 1981
- Studios: Record One, Los Angeles
- Genre: Rock
- Length: 39:31
- Label: Asylum
- Producers: Jackson Browne, Greg Ladanyi

David Lindley chronology
El Rayo-X (1981)	Win This Record! (1982)

El Rayo-X is David Lindley's debut studio album, released in 1981. The album spent 18 weeks on the Billboard 200, peaking at No. 83 on July 16, 1981.

== Reception ==
Professional ratings
Review scores
Source	Rating
AllMusic	4.5/5 stars
Robert Christgau	B+

The album generally received favorable reviews. Boo Browning, of The Washington Post, wrote:

El Rayo-X is not this year's greatest album, but there's very little to compete with it for well-executed let-the-good-times rock. Coming from a fellow who's spent the last few years contemplating Jackson Browne's elbow, it's a delightful surprise -- sort of like rounding the corner at the Haunted House and bumping into a six-foot Goofy.

In a retrospective review, AllMusic's Matthew Greenwald stated:

Lindley scored a contract with Elektra Records and put together an excellent band that was able to keep up with his eclectic vision. Combining blues, rock & roll, Cajun, Zydeco, Middle Eastern music, and other elements, his debut album is an absolute joy.

== Track listing ==
Side 1

1. "She Took Off My Romeos" (Bob "Frizz" Fuller) – 3:00
2. "Bye Bye Love" (Boudleaux Bryant, Felice Bryant) – 2:50
3. "Mercury Blues" (K. C. Douglas, Bob Geddins) – 3:33
4. "Quarter of a Man" (Bob "Frizz" Fuller) – 3:45
5. "Ain't No Way" (Bob "Frizz" Fuller) – 3:42
6. "Twist and Shout" (Phil Medley, Bert Russell) – 2:44

Side 2

1. "El Rayo-X" (Jorge Calderón, David Lindley) – 2:53
2. "Your Old Lady" (Elmo Glick, O'Kelly Isley, King Curtis) – 4:14
3. "Don't Look Back" (Smokey Robinson, Ronald White) – 3:55
4. "Petit Fleur" (Solomon Feldthouse, Nancy Lindley) – 3:11
5. "Tu-Ber-Cu-Lucas and the Sinus Blues" (Huey "Piano" Smith) – 2:14
6. "Pay the Man" (David Lindley, George "Baboo" Pierre) – 3:30

== Personnel ==
Musicians

- David Lindley – vocals; electric guitar (tracks 1, 2, 4–7, 9–12), slide guitar (tracks 3, 8), divan saz (track 5), bandurria (tracks 7, 9), 6-string bass (track 8), fiddle (track 10), whistling (track 11)
- William D. "Smitty" Smith – organ (tracks 1, 5–7, 11–12)
- Bob Glaub – bass (tracks 1–5, 7, 9, 12)
- Ian Wallace – drums
- George "Ras Baboo" Pierre – percussion (tracks 1–5, 8, 10, 11), vocals (tracks 2, 6, 9, 11, 12), accordion (tracks 2, 12), timbales (tracks 6, 7, 9)
- Jackson Browne – vocals (tracks 2, 6, 7, 9)
- Jorge Calderón – vocals (tracks 6, 7)
- Garth Hudson – horns (track 7)
- Curt Bouterse – hammered dulcimer (track 10)
- Bill Payne – organ (track 2)
- Reggie McBride – bass (tracks 6, 10, 11)

Technical

- Greg Ladanyi – engineer, producer
- Jackson Browne – producer
- George Ybara, Jamie Ledner – assistant engineers
- Doug Sax, Mike Reese – mastering
- Jimmy Wachtel – art direction, design
- Gloria Von Jansky – lettering
- Kaz Sakamoto – photography

== Awards and Charts ==
=== Billboard charts ===
Year	Chart	Single	Peak
1981	Pop Albums		83
1981	Mainstream rock	Mercury Blues	34

=== RPM charts ===
Year	Chart	Peak
1981	Pop Albums	28
