= Kaleidoscope (American band) =

American psychedelic folk band

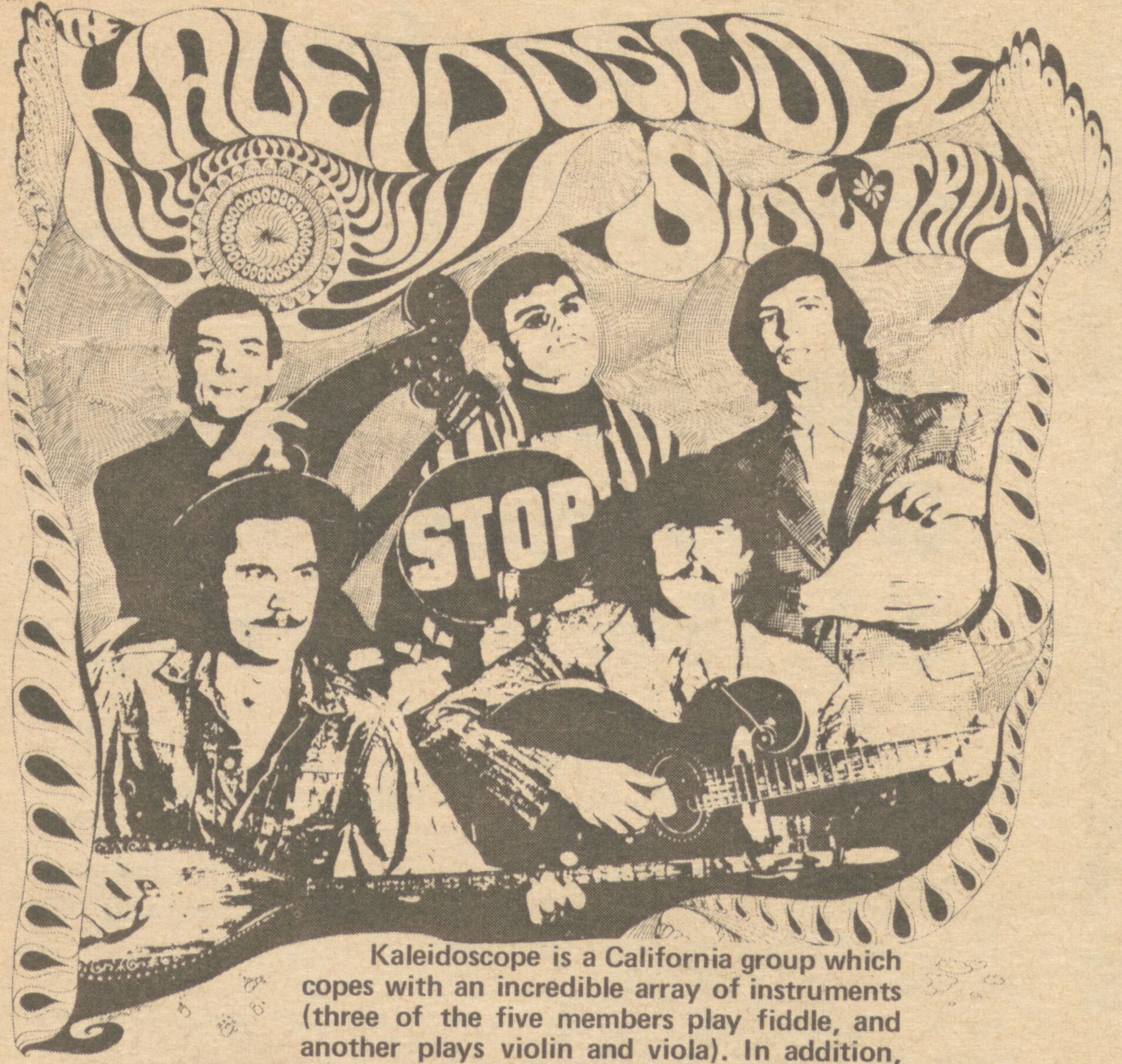
- Original members of Kaleidoscope as imaged on their first album, Side Trips, released in 1967

Background information
- Origin: Los Angeles, California, United States
- Genres: Psychedelic rock; psychedelic folk; world; country
- Years active: 1966–1970 (Reunions in 1976 and 1990)
- Labels: Epic, Island
- Past members: David Lindley; Chester Crill; Solomon Feldthouse; John Vidican; Chris Darrow; Stuart Brotman; Paul Lagos; Jeff Kaplan; Ron Johnston

Kaleidoscope (originally the Kaleidoscope) was an American psychedelic folk group who recorded four albums and several singles for Epic Records between 1966 and 1970. The band membership included David Lindley, who later released numerous solo albums and won additional renown as a multi-instrumentalist session musician, and Chris Darrow who later performed and recorded with a number of groups including the Nitty Gritty Dirt Band.

== History ==
=== Formation ===
The group was formed in 1966. The original members were:

- David Lindley
- Solomon Feldthouse
- Chris Darrow
- Chester Crill (a.k.a. Max Budda, Max Buda, Fenrus Epp, Templeton Parcely)
- John Vidican

Lindley was an experienced performer on a variety of stringed instruments, notably the banjo, winning the Topanga Canyon Banjo Contest several years in a row in the early 1960s. While studying at La Salle High School in Pasadena, California, he formed his first group, the Mad Mountain Ramblers, who performed around the Los Angeles folk clubs. There, he met Darrow, who was a member of a rival group, the Re-Organized Dry City Players.

Around 1964, the pair formed a new group, the Dry City Scat Band, which also included fiddle player Richard Greene (later of Seatrain), but Darrow soon left to set up a new rock group, the Floggs. Lindley also began forming his own electric group. In the course of this he met Feldthouse, who had been raised in Turkey and, on returning to the US, had performed flamenco music and as an accompanist to belly dancing groups. Lindley and Feldthouse then began performing as a duo, David and Solomon, when they met Chester Crill. They invited him to join their band, and by the end of 1966 added Darrow and drummer John Vidican, so forming the Kaleidoscope.

=== Recording and performance career ===
The group was founded on democratic principles – there was no "leader". They soon began performing live in clubs, winning a recording contract with Epic Records. The first single, "Please", was released in December 1966. It was produced by Barry Friedman (later known as Frazier Mohawk), as was their first album Side Trips, released in May 1967. The album showcased the group's musical diversity and studio experimentation. It included Feldthouse's "Egyptian Gardens", Darrow's "Keep Your Mind Open", and versions of Cab Calloway's "Minnie the Moocher" and Dock Boggs' "Oh Death". Crill, for reasons he never made clear (but ex-bandmates speculated had to do with concerns about overreactions from his "straitlaced" parents), was credited as "Fenrus Epp" on the first album and adopted various other pseudonyms on later recordings.

Between them, the group played a huge collection of stringed instruments in such psychedelic songs as "Egyptian Gardens" and "Pulsating Dream." They played fusions of Middle-Eastern music with rock in longer pieces such as "Taxim," which they performed at numerous venues including the Berkeley Folk Festival on July 4, 1967, and the Newport Folk Festival and the Family Dog at The Avalon Ballroom (San Francisco) in 1968. Live, band numbers were sometimes interspersed by solo instrumental turns from Feldthouse or Lindley, and occasionally Feldthouse brought belly dancers or flamenco dancers on stage. The band performed many different styles, including rock, blues, folk, jazz, Middle-Eastern and also featured music by Calloway and Duke Ellington in their repertoire.

Keeping the same line-up (but with Crill now billing himself as "Max Buda") the band's second album A Beacon from Mars was released in November 1967, to generally good reviews but poor sales. The album was a mix of Middle-Eastern, country, folk and rock musical styles. The title track, inspired by a Howlin' Wolf musical riff originally in his song "Smokestack Lightning", was recorded live in the studio, and featured a long psychedelic electric guitar solo by Lindley, which later caused Led Zeppelin's Jimmy Page to refer to Kaleidoscope as his "favourite band of all time." In live performances of the tune, Lindley used a violin bow on his electric guitar, probably influencing Page to use the same effect later. Another live "no overdubs" track on the album was "Taxim," with solos from Lindley on a "harp guitar" and Felthouse, who played oud and saz on the lengthy cut.

Liner notes to the much-later CD reissue claim the album's original title was "Bacon From Mars," but that the title was misprinted. This is a complete myth, initiated by a joke printed in the magazine ZigZag during their three-part feature on Kaleidoscope.

Darrow left the group after recording the album and was replaced by bassist Stuart Brotman, previously a member of an early version of Canned Heat. However, Darrow returned briefly for studio work when the group backed first Johnny "Guitar" Watson and Larry Williams on their 1967 single "Nobody", and later Leonard Cohen on "So Long, Marianne" and "Teachers" on his first album. Vidican was also replaced by drummer Paul Lagos, who had a jazz and R&B background, having played with Little Richard, Johnny Otis, and Ike and Tina Turner. And Crill now billed himself as "Templeton Parcely" when playing with the band... but also billed himself as guest player "Max Buda", for his harmonica playing.

The band recorded their third album, Incredible! Kaleidoscope, in 1968. It featured "Seven-Ate Sweet", a long progressive instrumental piece in 7/8 time signature which they had been playing live since the early days of the group. The album reached No. 139 on Billboard in 1969, the only Kaleidoscope album to chart. Around this time they also did soundtrack work on educational and other films, and also made an appearance at the 1968 Newport Folk Festival.

Kaleidoscope's fourth and final album from their Epic Records era, Bernice, featured more electric guitar work than the earlier albums, and more country influence. There were further personnel changes, adding singer-guitarist Jeff Kaplan, and bassist Ron Johnston who replaced Brotman during the making of the album. Feldthouse also left the group. Crill was now billed as "Connie Crill", and as guest harmonica player "Max Buda".

At the end of 1969, Kaleidoscope contributed two new songs ("Brother Mary" and "Mickey's Tune") to Michelangelo Antonioni's Zabriskie Point. The band split up soon afterwards.

== Later careers ==
After the end of Kaleidoscope, Lindley became a highly respected session and live musician with Linda Ronstadt, Jackson Browne and others, before forming his own band, El Rayo-X, in the early 1980s. Feldthouse performed at Renaissance Pleasure Faires, and with various flamenco and Middle Eastern groups. Darrow joined the Nitty Gritty Dirt Band after Kaleidoscope and later formed the Corvettes with Bernie Leadon before becoming a leading session musician and solo performer. Crill became an underground comic writer for a time, co-writing the Mickey Rat series, and also produced the first 78rpm record by R. Crumb's group, Armstrong's Pasadenans. Brotman became involved with the LA folk dance scene and has done considerable work as a movie extra. In the 1980s he became active in Klezmer revival, playing bass and tsimbl for Brave Old World and most recently is a member of the San Francisco-based trio, Veretski Pass whose most recent CD, The Magid Chronicles, was released in 2019. He is also a regular instructor at KlezCalifornia and KlezKanada, and other ethnic music gatherings.

Paul Lagos died on October 19, 2009. Chris Darrow died on January 15, 2020. Solomon Feldthouse died on December 12, 2021. Lindley died on March 3, 2023.

== Kaleidoscope reunions ==
In 1976, ex-members Brotman, Crill, Darrow, Feldthouse and Lagos reconvened for the reunion album, When Scopes Collide, which was released on Michael Nesmith's Pacific Arts label. Lindley also contributed, but distanced himself from the project by appearing as a guest, billed as "De Paris Letante." Crill was billed as two band members ("Templeton Parcely" and "Max Buda"), and was credited as a producer under his real name.

Fourteen years later, Crill and Darrow organized and produced a second reunion session, this time for Gifthorse Records. Greetings from Kartoonistan (We Ain't Dead Yet), again brought together the same line-up (although this time Crill only billed himself as "Max Buda" in the band member credits), with Brotman contributing the instrumental, "Klezmer Suite". Though invited, Lindley declined to participate.

== Other information ==
- Solomon Feldthouse was the father of film actress Fairuza Balk.
- Chris Darrow performed on the James Taylor album Sweet Baby James.
- According to Camper Van Beethoven frontman David Lowery, that band's recording of "O Death" on their album Our Beloved Revolutionary Sweetheart was intended as a tribute to Kaleidoscope.
- Tony Molina covered Kaleidoscope's song "Dear Nellie Goodrich" for a limited pressing of his 2025 album, On This Day.

== Discography ==
Studio albums:

- Side Trips (1967)
- A Beacon from Mars (1968)
- Incredible! Kaleidoscope (1969)
- Bernice (1970)
- When Scopes Collide (1976)
- Greetings from Kartoonistan... (We Ain't Dead Yet) (1991)

Compilation albums:

- Bacon from Mars (1983) (compilation)
- Rampe, Rampe (1983) (compilation)
- Egyptian Candy (A Collection) (1990) (compilation)
- Beacon from Mars & Other Psychedelic Side Trips (2004) (compilation)
- Pulsating Dreams (2004) (compilation of the four Epic albums and other recordings of that period)
