= Werewolves of London =

1978 single by Warren Zevon

Single by Warren Zevon

from the album Excitable Boy
- B-side: "Roland the Headless Thompson Gunner"
- Released: March 1978
- Recorded: 1977
- Genre: Rock; comedy rock; pop
- Length: 3:27
- Label: Asylum
- Songwriters: LeRoy Marinell, Waddy Wachtel, Warren Zevon
- Producers: Jackson Browne, Waddy Wachtel

Warren Zevon singles chronology
"Hasten Down the Wind" (1977)	"Werewolves of London" (1978)	"Lawyers, Guns and Money" (1978)

Music video
- "Werewolves of London" on YouTube

"Werewolves of London" is a song recorded by American singer-songwriter Warren Zevon, written by Zevon, LeRoy Marinell and Waddy Wachtel. It first appeared on Excitable Boy (1978), Zevon's third studio album, then it was released as a single by Asylum Records in March 1978, becoming a Top 40 US hit, the only one of Zevon's career, reaching No. 21 on the US Billboard Hot 100 in May.

Inspired by Phil Everly, it includes Fleetwood Mac's Mick Fleetwood on drums and John McVie on bass.

== Background and recording ==
The song began as a joke by Phil Everly (of the Everly Brothers) to Zevon in 1975, over two years before the recording sessions for Excitable Boy. Everly had watched a television broadcast of the 1935 film Werewolf of London and "suggested to Zevon that he adapt the title for a song and dance craze." Zevon played with the idea with his band members LeRoy P. Marinell and Waddy Wachtel, who wrote the song together in about 15 minutes, all contributing lyrics that were transcribed by Zevon's wife Crystal. However, none of them took the song seriously.

Soon after, Zevon's friend Jackson Browne saw the lyrics and thought "Werewolves of London" had potential and began performing the song during his own live concerts. T Bone Burnett also performed the song, on the first leg of Bob Dylan's Rolling Thunder Revue tour in the autumn of 1975. Burnett's version of the song included alternate or partially improvised lyrics mentioning stars from classical Hollywood cinema, along with mentions of vanished labor leader Jimmy Hoffa, and adult film stars Marilyn Chambers and Linda Lovelace. "Excitable Boy" and "Werewolves of London" were considered for, but not included on, Zevon's second album Warren Zevon in 1976.

According to Wachtel, "Werewolves of London" was "the hardest song to get down in the studio I've ever worked on." However, Wachtel "laid down his solo in one take." They tried at least seven different configurations of musicians in the recording studio before being satisfied with McVie and Fleetwood's contributions. Bob Glaub and Russ Kunkel were among the several musicians who auditioned; Zevon rejected them because he thought their playing was "too cute". Although 59 takes were recorded, Browne and Zevon selected the second take for the final mix. Wachtel recalled that the session began in the evening and went into the next morning. The protracted studio time and musicians' fees led to the song eating up most of the album's budget.

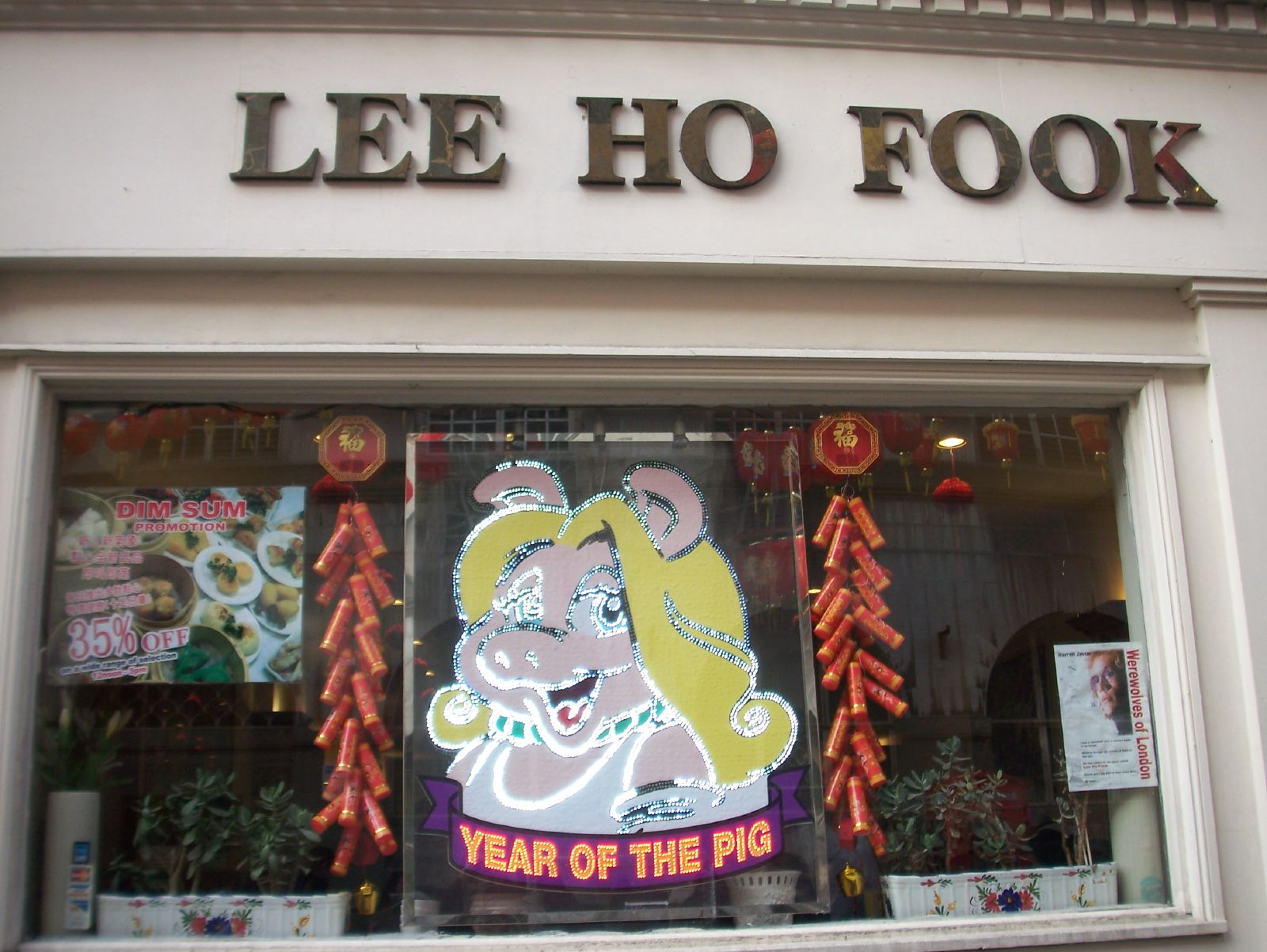
Lee Ho Fook in London—the werewolf goes here to get beef chow mein.

The song's lyrics "He was looking for the place called Lee Ho Fook's / Gonna get a big dish of beef chow mein" refer to Lee Ho Fook, a Chinese restaurant that was at 15 Gerrard Street in London's Chinatown, which is in the West End of London. It closed in 2008. Egon Ronay's Dunlop Guide for 1974 discussed the restaurant and said it served Cantonese cuisine. In concerts, Zevon would often change the line "You better stay away from him, he'll rip your lungs out, Jim / I'd like to meet his tailor", to "And he's looking for James Taylor".

Over Zevon's objections, Elektra Records chose "Werewolves of London" as the album's first single (he preferred "Johnny Strikes Up the Band" or "Tenderness on the Block"). The song was a quick hit, staying in the Billboard Top 40 chart for over a month.

== Personnel ==
- Warren Zevon – piano, vocals
- Mick Fleetwood – drums
- John McVie – bass
- Waddy Wachtel – guitars

== Reception and legacy ==
BBC Radio 2 listeners rated it as having the best opening line in a song: "I saw a werewolf with a Chinese menu in his hand".

Zevon later said of the song, "I don't know why that became such a hit. We didn't think it was suitable to be played on the radio. It didn't become an albatross. It's better that I bring something to mind than nothing. There are times when I prefer that it was "Bridge Over Troubled Water", but I don't think bad about the song. I still think it's funny." He also described "Werewolves of London" as a novelty song, "[but] not a novelty the way, say, Steve Martin's "King Tut" is a novelty."

The song had a resurgence in popularity in 1986 due to its use in a scene in The Color of Money, where Tom Cruise dances and lip-syncs to the song in a scene in which Cruise "displayed the depths of his talents at the billiards game of 9-ball."

After Zevon's death in 2003, Jackson Browne stated that he interpreted the song as describing an upper class English womanizer: "It's about a really well-dressed, ladies' man, a werewolf preying on little old ladies. In a way it's the Victorian nightmare, the gigolo thing."

== Charts ==
=== Weekly charts ===
Chart (1978)	Peak position
Australia (Kent Music Report)	8
Canada RPM Top Singles	18
New Zealand (RIANZ)	11
U.S. Billboard Hot 100	21
U.S. Cash Box Top 100	15

Chart (1987)	Peak position
UK Singles (OCC)	87

=== Year-end charts ===
Chart (1978)	Rank
Australia (Kent Music Report)	63
Canada	140
U.S. (Joel Whitburn's Pop Annual)	141

== Certifications ==
Region	Certification	Certified units/sales
United Kingdom (BPI)	Silver	200,000^{‡}
^{‡} Sales+streaming figures based on certification alone.

== Samples and other versions ==
- David Lindley performed the song live in concert with Jackson Browne before it was released by Zevon. Lindley adapted the lyrics, taking some ideas from Burnett's version, and released the song on the 1988 album, Very Greasy by Lindley and his band El Rayo X.
- Adam Sandler provided a version for the tribute album, Enjoy Every Sandwich: The Songs of Warren Zevon (October 2004). Sandler also performed it on the Late Show on December 15, 2004. Mick Fleetwood and Waddy Wachtel, who played on Warren Zevon's original recording of the song, play on Sandler's cover version.
- American pop-rocker Masha covered the song for a Three Olives Vodka ad campaign in 2014.
- Dexy's Midnight Runners song "One of Those Things" has a riff taken from "Werewolves of London". For the 1997 re-release of the album Don't Stand Me Down, Kevin Rowland admitted in the liner notes that he had used the riff and consequently Zevon and his co-writers, LeRoy Marinell and Waddy Wachtel, were given writing credits on the song.
- Kid Rock sampled this song in 2008 (and Lynyrd Skynyrd's "Sweet Home Alabama", which has a similar riff) on "All Summer Long" and credits Zevon as a songwriter.
- In 2017, Italian comedy-rock band Elio e le Storie Tese made an Italian version of this song, "Licantropo Vegano" ("Vegan Werewolf"); the difference with the original version is that the werewolf is vegan and the song is based in Milan, and not in London.
