= Chris Darrow =

American musician (1944–2020)

- Born: Christopher Lloyd Darrow; July 30, 1944; Sioux Falls, South Dakota, U.S.
- Died: January 15, 2020 (aged 75)
- Genres: Rock, country rock
- Occupation: Musician
- Instruments: Guitar, bass guitar, violin, banjo, lap steel guitar, mandolin, sitar
- Years active: 1963–2019
- Formerly of: The Dry City Scat Band, Kaleidoscope, Nitty Gritty Dirt Band

Christopher Lloyd Darrow (July 30, 1944 – January 15, 2020) was an American multi-instrumentalist and singer-songwriter. He was considered to be a pioneer of country rock music in the late-1960s and performed and recorded with numerous groups, including Kaleidoscope and the Nitty Gritty Dirt Band.

== Biography ==
=== Early life ===
Darrow was born in Sioux Falls, South Dakota, but grew up in the Los Angeles suburb of Claremont, California, listening to Ritchie Valens and the Everly Brothers on the radio. He began playing ukulele, but purchased his first guitar at age 13. His father Paul had played clarinet with traditional jazz band The Mentor Street Maniacs.

Attending Pitzer College, Darrow spent two years assisting folklorist Guy Carawan, who taught American Folk Life Studies. Darrow's interest in folk and bluegrass music sparked the formation of his first band, the Reorganized Dry City Players in 1963, followed by the Mad Mountain Ramblers.

=== The Dry City Scat Band ===
In 1964, Darrow formed the bluegrass band The Dry City Scat Band with David Lindley, Richard Greene, Steve Cahill, and Pete Madlem. In 1964, the Scat Band performed regularly at Disneyland and at the Ash Grove in Hollywood.

Darrow also attended Claremont graduate school, getting his master's degree in art. During this time, Darrow met fellow bluegrass artist Chris Hillman, and Hillman's transition to playing rock music with The Byrds had a profound effect on Darrow.

=== The Floggs and Kaleidoscope ===
Darrow's first rock band was the Floggs, which also included Roger Palos (bass), Bill Stamps (lead guitar), Tommy Salisbury (drums), and Hugh Kohler (keyboards).

Darrow then joined Lindley in the psychedelic band Kaleidoscope, which also included Solomon Feldthouse and Max Buda. The band blended Middle Eastern, country, folk, blues and psychedelia, incorporating the Turkish oud and saz. Darrow, who composed and sang lead vocal on a number of songs, quit Kaleidoscope shortly after completion of Beacon From Mars.

In 1976, Kaleidoscope reunited to record the album When Scopes Collide and then, in 1991, Greetings From Kartoonistan... We Ain't Dead Yet.

=== Nitty Gritty Dirt Band ===
In 1967, Darrow joined the Nitty Gritty Dirt Band, replacing Bruce Kunkel, and recorded two albums with the band: Rare Junk and Uncle Charlie & His Dog Teddy. As a part of the band, he appeared in the Clint Eastwood musical Paint Your Wagon.

=== The Corvettes ===
In 1969, Darrow and Jeff Hanna formed The Corvettes, releasing two singles produced by Mike Nesmith for Dot Records. Linda Ronstadt recruited the band to be her touring band. When Hanna left the Corvettes to return to the Dirt Band, he was replaced by Bernie Leadon.

=== Solo career ===
In 1972, Darrow released his first album Artist Proof on Fantasy. It was reissued with bonus tracks in 2012 by Drag City Records. Personnel included Mickey McGee (drums), Ed Black (pedal steel guitar), Arnie Moore (bass), Loren Newkirk (piano), John Ware (drums), and Claudia Linear and Jennifer Warnes (backing vocals).

His next two albums Chris Darrow and Under My Own Disguise were released by United Artists. Chris Darrow was recorded with members of Fairport Convention, the Jeff Beck Group, and Elton John's band. After Darrow took Ben Harper under his wing, Harper recorded a cover of Darrow's song "Whipping Boy" as the lead single for his major label debut album.

In the mid-'90s, Darrow recorded for the German label Taxim. In 2000, he released the two-CD set Coyote: Straight from the Heart which includes a 40-minute instrumental suite and 20 original songs.

=== Other work ===
Darrow played bass on Leonard Cohen's debut Songs of Leonard Cohen. Outtakes of those sessions were later used in Robert Altman's film McCabe and Mrs. Miller.

Darrow provided fiddle and violin on James Taylor's Sweet Baby James.

In 1973, Darrow and Bob Mosley of Moby Grape recorded three demos as the Darrow/Mosley Band. These were later released on Desert Rain on the Shagrat label. They were joined by Frank Reckard (lead guitar), Loren Newkirk (keyboards) and Johnny Craviotto (drums).

=== Photography ===
Darrow took photographs since age 9, and shot album cover photographs for Starr Parodi, David Lindley and Henry Kaiser, Mojave, The Cache Valley Drifters, Swampdogs, and Los Chumps.

=== Death ===
Darrow died, aged 75, on January 15, 2020, of complications from a stroke.

== Discography ==
=== Solo albums ===
- 1972: Artist Proof (Fantasy) reissued in 2012 by Drag City
- 1973: Chris Darrow (United Artists) reissued in 2009 by Everloving Records
- 1974: Under My Own Disguise (United Artists) reissued in 2009 by Everloving
- 1979: Fretless (Pacific Arts)
- 1980: A Southern California Drive (Wild Bunch)
- 1981: Eye of the Storm (Takoma) with Max Buda
- 1997: Coyote Straight from the Heart (Taxim)
- 1998: Harem Girl (Taxim)
- 2002: Slide on In (Taxim)
- 2006: Wages of Sin (Taxim)

=== As a member of Kaleidoscope ===
- 1967: Side Trips (Epic)
- 1968: A Beacon from Mars (Epic)
- 1977: When Scopes Collide (Pacific Arts) reissued in 2005 by Taxim
- 1991: Greetings From Kartoonistan... (Gifthorse)

=== As a member of The Nitty Gritty Dirt Band ===
- 1968: Rare Junk (Liberty)
- 1969 Alive! (Liberty)
- 1970: Uncle Charlie & His Dog Teddy (Liberty)

=== As a member of the Darrow-Mosley Band ===
- 1973: Desert Rain (Shagrat) released 2010

=== As composer ===
- 1970: Louie and the Lovers – Rise (Epic) – track 10, "If The Night"
- 1970: Kaleidoscope – Bernice (Epic) – track 5, "Lulu Arfin Nanny"
- 1994: Ben Harper – Welcome to the Cruel World (Virgin) – track 2, "Whipping Boy"
- 2014: Jo Jo Clark – New Hound in Town (Fuel 2000) – track 9, "King of the Cowboys"; track 12, "Goin' Back To Texas" (both songs co-written with Kim Fowley)

=== As producer ===
- 1972: Guy Carawan – The Telling Takes Me Home (Cur Non)
- 1972: Maxfield Parrish – It's a Cinch to Give Legs to Old Hard-Boiled Eggs (Cur Non)
- 1975: Toulouse Engelhardt – Toullusions (Briar)
- 1983: Super Heroines – Souls That Save (Bemisbrain Records)

=== Also appeared on ===
- 1970: John Stewart – Willard (Capitol)
- 1970: James Taylor – Sweet Baby James (Warner Bros.)
- 1971: Hoyt Axton – Joy to the World (Capitol)
- 1971: John Stewart – The Lonesome Picker Rides Again (Warner Bros.)
- 1972: John Fahey and His Orchestra – Of Rivers and Religion (Reprise)
- 1972: Marc McClure – Marc McClure (Capitol)
- 1972: Morning – Struck Like Silver (Fantasy)
- 1972: Odyssey – Odyssey (MoWest)
- 1973: John Fahey and His Orchestra – After The Ball (Reprise)
- 1973: Andy Goldmark – Andy Goldmark (Warner Bros.)
- 1973: John Stewart – Cannons in the Rain (RCA Victor)
- 1975: Baron Stewart – Bartering (United Artists)
- 1976: Larry Hosford – Cross Words (Shelter)
- 1976: Robb Strandlund – Robb Strandlund (Polydor)
- 1977: Sammy Walker – Blue Ridge Mountain Skyline (Warner Bros.)
- 1977: Helen Reddy – Ear Candy (Capitol)
- 1977: Rank Strangers – Rank Strangers (Pacific Arts)
- 1978: Harry Chapin – Living Room Suite (Elektra)
- 1978: Dyan Diamond – In the Dark (MCA)
- 1980: The Packards – Pray for Surf (Surfside)
- 1986: The Unforgiven – The Unforgiven (Elektra)
- 1987: Divine Horsemen – Snake Handler (SST)
- 1997: Bill Ward – When the Bough Breaks (Purple Pyramid)
- 1997: Kyle Vincent – Kyle Vincent (Hollywood Records)
- 2005: Kwanzamo Roots Rockers - Ntombiyam (Actual Music)
- 2009: Tea – Dreams (Teajuana)
- 2016: Corky Carroll and the Piranha (Darla)
