= A Beacon from Mars =

Studio album by The Kaleidoscope
- Released: November 1967
- Recorded: 1967
- Genre: Folk, psychedelic rock, blues rock, Arabic
- Length: 43:50
- Label: Epic
- Producer: Mike Goldberg, Stu Eisen

The Kaleidoscope chronology
Side Trips (1967)	A Beacon from Mars (1967)	Incredible! Kaleidoscope (1969)

A Beacon from Mars is Kaleidoscope's second album. It was published in November 1967 by Epic Records along with the single "I Found Out" b/w "Rampè Rampè". At the time it was released it received good reviews, but like Kaleidoscope's other albums, it was commercially unsuccessful.

== Reception ==
Professional ratings
Review scores
Source	Rating
Allmusic	3/5 stars

Allmusic's retrospective review hailed the album as flawless brilliance, "the best non-compilation showcase of Kaleidoscope's legendary eclecticism and versatility." They noted the many styles represented by each of the songs, and deemed that "Every one of these disparate styles is performed with authority and commitment, and the result still has the power to amaze." The track "Taxim" is based on "Şehnaz Longa", a Turkish piece by Santuri Ethem Efendi. A 1968 music reviewer stated: "“Here is the most versatile band we have ever heard. You want ragtime? Listen to 'Baldheaded End Of A Broom' which brings back early Spoonful fun. Lovely bass, good mandolin and harmonica. How about authentic hillbilly music? 'Louisiana Man' hunts muskrats in the swamps to bagpipe-sounding fiddles, embellished in drums, of course. Or hard blues? They make good use of their instruments. fuzzed up on the tense, electric 'You Don't Love Me'. High register harmonica screams over a heavy swing bottom. Excellent tension contrasts. 'I Found Out' is a medium tempo folkish tune. 'Greenwood Side', is a slow, emotional Scottish ballad of death, again with bagpipe fiddles and death roll drums. 'Life Will Pass You By', is a Byrd-like song with hillbilly twang harmony and mandolin. 'Taxim' is a long oriental-sounding instrumental, featuring excellent musicianship on caz, oud, harp guitar.”

== Track listing ==
No.	Title	Writer(s)	Length
1.	"I Found Out"	Earl Shackleford	2:11
2.	"Greenwood Sidee"	traditional	4:17
3.	"Life Will Pass You By"	Chris Darrow	3:26
4.	"Taxim"	Kaleidoscope	11:23
5.	"Baldheaded End of a Broom"	traditional	3:15
6.	"Louisiana Man"	Doug Kershaw	2:46
7.	"You Don't Love Me"	Willie Cobbs	4:00
8.	"Beacon from Mars"	Kaleidoscope	12:32

== Personnel ==
Kaleidoscope

- Saul Feldthouse – lead vocals (tracks 1–3, 8), baglama (track 4), oud (track 4), bass (tracks 5, 6), guitar (track 7), gong (track 8)
- David Lindley – guitar (tracks 1–5, 7, 8), violin (track 2, 6), backing vocals (tracks 3, 6)
- Chester Crill (as Maxwell Buda) – organ (track 1, 8), harmonica (tracks 1, 5, 7, 8), violin (tracks 2, 4, 6), bass (track 3), piano (tracks 3, 8), backing vocals (track 7), harpsichord (track 8)
- Chris Darrow – bass (tracks 1, 4, 7, 8), mandolin (tracks 3, 5), backing vocals (track 3), lead vocals (tracks 5–7), guitar (track 6)
- John Vidican – drums (tracks 1–8), tympani (track 4, 8)

Additional personnel

- Peter Madlem – Dobro (track 1)
