= Roland the Headless Thompson Gunner =

Song by Warren Zevon and David Lindell

Song by Warren Zevon

from the album Excitable Boy
- Released: 1978
- Recorded: 1977
- Genre: Rock
- Length: 3:47
- Label: Asylum
- Songwriters: Warren Zevon, David Lindell

"Roland the Headless Thompson Gunner" is a song composed by Warren Zevon and David Lindell and performed by Zevon. It was included on Zevon's 1978 album Excitable Boy, and while never released as a single became a fan favorite. It was the last song he performed in front of an audience, during an October 2002 appearance on The Late Show with David Letterman, before his death in 2003.

== About the song ==
Warren Zevon in 1978

In 1973, American musician Warren Zevon met David Lindell in Sitges, Catalonia, where Lindell operated a bar named "The Dubliner" after working as a mercenary in Africa. Inspired by Lindell's stories of his career as a mercenary, Zevon decided to collaborate with him in making a song about a left-wing mercenary.

The resulting song Zevon and Lindell produced, "Roland the Headless Thompson Gunner", describes the life of fictional Norwegian mercenary Roland. In Denmark, a Thompson submachine gun–equipped Roland agrees to join the Biafran Armed Forces as a mercenary and fight in the Nigerian Civil War. Roland then decides to leave for the Democratic Republic of the Congo, where he joins the Congolese military and fights against "the Bantu". Eventually, the Central Intelligence Agency decides to assassinate Roland, and pays one of his comrades, Van Owen, to kill him on their behalf. Van Owen shoots him in the head and Roland becomes a vengeful ghost. His comrades still see "his headless body stalking through the night". The headless Roland searches Africa for Van Owen, eventually finding him drinking gin in a Mombasa bar and killing him. After killing Van Owen, Roland continues to work as a mercenary in Ireland, Lebanon, Palestine, and Berkeley. The song concludes by claiming that Roland played a role in the 1974 kidnapping of Patty Hearst by the Symbionese Liberation Army.

According to the album's liner notes, musicians on the track were Zevon (vocals, piano, organ); Waddy Wachtel (guitar); Bob Glaub (bass guitar); and Russell Kunkel (drums), and backing vocals were provided by an ad-hoc ensemble called The Gentlemen Boys, which included Zevon, Wachtel, Jackson Browne, Jorge Calderón, Kenny Edwards, and JD Souther.

== Film reference ==
The song is a favorite of screenwriter David Koepp. He named the big-game hunter in The Lost World: Jurassic Park "Roland Tembo" as a reference to the song, and then "thought it would be fun to make his nemesis' last name Van Owen, like in the song", thus leading to the name of one of the protagonists being Nick Van Owen.

== See also ==
- Headless Horseman
