= Mojave (band) =

Canadian folk duo

- Origin: Vancouver, British Columbia, Canada
- Genres: Acoustic; Folk; Alternative country
- Years active: 2006–present
- Labels: Black Canvas Records
- Members: Lisa Jarvis; Paul Jarvis
- Website: mojave.fm

Mojave is an acoustic and folk band fronted by Canadian singer-songwriters Lisa Jarvis and Paul Jarvis accompanied by a varying number of musicians, started in 2007.

== History ==
The name Mojave comes from the band's deep commitment to the environment, and specifically to the Mojave Desert in California.

In 2009 they were voted one of Vancouver's best independent bands by The Georgia Straight. Billboard magazine has called Mojave "Promising newcomers".

=== Stories (2007) ===
Their first studio album – released Aug 30, 2007. Recorded and produced by Tim Neuhaus. They are also featured on 1% For The Planet's "The Music, Vol. 1" Compilation CD, along with Jack Johnson, Josh Ritter, Grace Potter and the Nocturnals, and many others – which hit the No. 1 spot on Amazon's MP3 Bestseller list.

=== Crows Funeral (2009) ===
Their second studio album – released May 30, 2009. Recorded Michael Chambers, produced by Dan Achen. To promote the album, they went on a cross-Canada tour from August 2009 to September 2009.

=== Rainy Ghost (2013) ===
Their third studio album – released Aug 6, 2013. Recorded Geoff Johnson, mixed by Mario Loubert and mastered by Dave Chick. 100% of album sales are being donated to animal charities.

== Band members ==
- Lisa Jarvis – lead vocals, guitar, acoustic guitar, banjo, harmonica, songwriter.
- Paul Jarvis – vocals, lead guitar, acoustic guitar, electric guitar, bass, songwriter.

== Discography ==
=== Studio albums ===
| Date of Release | Title | Label |
|---|---|---|
| 2007 | Stories | Black Canvas Records |
| 2009 | Crows Funeral | Black Canvas Records |
| 2013 | Rainy Ghost | Black Canvas Records |

=== Compilations ===
- 2010 One Percent for the Planet – The Music, Vol. 1

== Awards and nominations ==
=== 2009 Georgia Straight ===
- Won 3rd place The Georgia Straight Best of Vancouver, Best Independent Band 2009
