= David Lindley (musician) =

American musician (1944–2023)

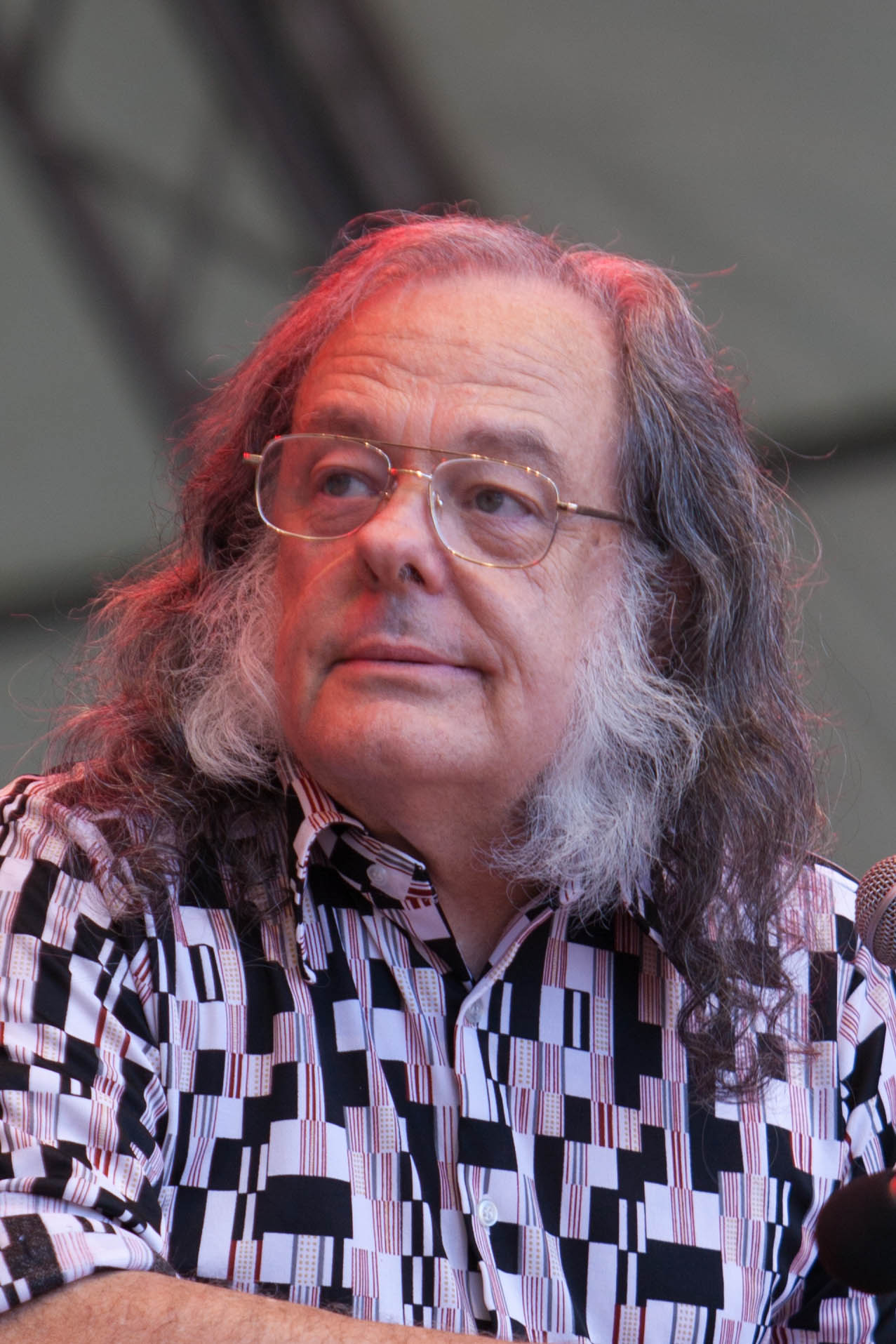
- Lindley in 2013

Background information
- Also known as: De Paris Letante, Mr. Dave
- Born: David Perry Lindley; March 21, 1944; San Marino, California, U.S.
- Died: March 3, 2023 (aged 78) Pomona, California, U.S.
- Genres: Rock, country, world
- Occupations: Musician; songwriter; producer; composer
- Instruments: Guitar; violin
- Years active: 1962–2020
- Labels: Asylum; Atlantic; Epic; RCA Victor; Shanachie
- Formerly of: Kaleidoscope; Terry Reid; El Rayo-X; Jackson Browne; Warren Zevon; Ry Cooder; Linda Ronstadt
- Website: davidlindley.com

David Perry Lindley (March 21, 1944 – March 3, 2023) was an American musician who founded the rock band El Rayo-X and worked with many other performers including Jackson Browne, Linda Ronstadt, Ry Cooder, Bonnie Raitt, Warren Zevon, Curtis Mayfield and Dolly Parton. He mastered such a wide variety of instruments that Acoustic Guitar magazine referred to him not as a multi-instrumentalist but instead as a "maxi-instrumentalist."

The majority of the instruments that Lindley played are string instruments, including violin, acoustic and electric guitar, upright and electric bass, banjo, mandolin, dobro, hardingfele, bouzouki, cittern, bağlama, gumbus, charango, cümbüş, oud and zither. He was described as "the unparalleled master of the lap steel guitar" in the rock music sphere, and an expert in Hawaiian-style slide guitar blues.

Lindley was a founding member of the 1960s psychedelic band Kaleidoscope and worked as musical director for several touring artists. He occasionally scored and composed music for film.

== Early life and career ==
David Perry Lindley was born in San Marino, California, to Margaret (née Wells) and John Royal Young Lindley (brother of actress Loretta Young) on March 21, 1944. When Lindley was growing up in Los Angeles, his father had an extensive collection of 78 rpm records that included Korean folk and Indian sitar music, as well as Spanish classical guitarists Andrés Segovia and Carlos Montoya. Lindley took up the violin at age three, and kept at it despite breaking the fragile bridge. He then moved on to the baritone ukulele in his early teens. Next he learned the banjo. By his late teens, he had won the Topanga Banjo•Fiddle Contest five times.

He played banjo with the Dry City Scat Band which included multi-instrumentalist Chris Darrow, and Richard Greene on fiddle. Lindley and his bandmates aspired to emulate multi-talented folk singer Mike Seeger.

Lindley began to frequent the Los Angeles–area folk music scene of the 1960s, primarily going to the Ash Grove club, but also attending the Troubador in West Hollywood, encountering an eclectic assortment of music including flamenco, Russian folk music, and Indian sitar music. At Ash Grove, Lindley shared ideas with local musicians such as Ry Cooder and Chris Hillman. Lindley formed an especially close relationship with Cooder; the two shared a love of "exotic music", and they both turned away from corporate mainstream music to focus on less popular idioms such as folk and world music. At Ash Grove, Lindley learned from traveling blues and folk musicians the "right" way to play certain styles, and he learned violin methods from local star Don "Sugarcane" Harris.

From 1966 to 1970, Lindley was a founding member of the psychedelic band Kaleidoscope which released four albums on Epic Records during that period. After Kaleidoscope broke up, Lindley went to England and played in Terry Reid's band for a couple of years. In 1972, he teamed with Jackson Browne, playing in his band through 1980 and occasionally afterward. During the 1970s he also toured as a member of the bands of Crosby-Nash, Linda Ronstadt and James Taylor.

In 1981, Lindley formed his own band, El Rayo-X. Jackson Browne produced their first album. The band's final show was December 31, 1989. After that, Lindley toured as a solo artist, first with Hani Naser accompanying on hand drums, then with reggae percussionist Wally Ingram. He also played on a multitude of studio sessions. Between his work in the studio as a session musician or on tour as a sideman or bandleader, Lindley learned new instruments. He was famous for having written the only song glorifying a brand of condoms, "Ram-a-Lamb-a-Man," from his album Win This Record! The media often commented on his colorful polyester clothing, with jarring contrasts between pants and shirt, earning him the nickname Prince of Polyester.

== Work with other artists ==
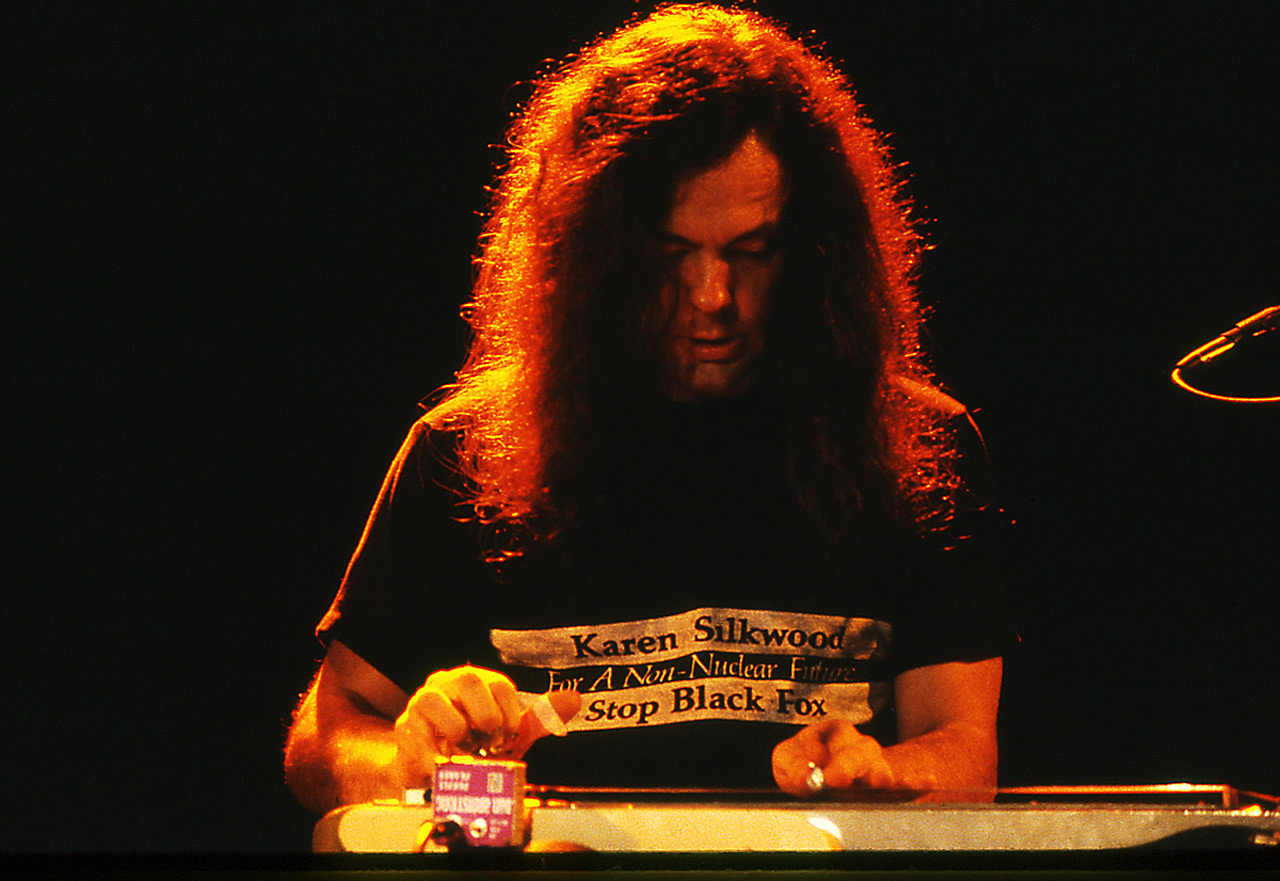
Lindley in Brisbane, 1980

Lindley was known for his work as a session musician. He contributed to years of recordings and live performances by Jackson Browne, and also supported Warren Zevon, Linda Ronstadt, Curtis Mayfield, James Taylor, David Crosby, Graham Nash, Terry Reid, Dolly Parton, Bob Dylan, Bruce Springsteen, Toto, Rod Stewart, Joe Walsh and Dan Fogelberg. He collaborated with fellow guitarists Ry Cooder, Henry Kaiser and G. E. Smith. Artist Ben Harper credited Lindley's distinctive slide guitar style as a major influence on his own playing, and, in 2006, Lindley sat in on Harper's album Both Sides of the Gun.

He was known in the guitar community for his use of "cheap" instruments sold at Sears department stores and intended for amateurs. He used these for the unique sounds they produce, especially with a slide. In the early 1990s, he toured and recorded with Hani Naser adding percussive instruments to his solo performances, and his instrumental repertoire which he used in his session work. Lindley also toured extensively and recorded with reggae percussionist Wally Ingram.

Lindley's voice may be heard in the version of "Stay" performed by Jackson Browne. Browne's version is a continuation of "The Load Out", and its refrain is sung in progressively higher vocal ranges. The refrain of "Oh won't you stay, just a little bit longer" is sung first by Browne, then by Rosemary Butler, then by Lindley in falsetto.

Lindley joined Jackson Browne for a tour of Spain in 2006. Love Is Strange: En Vivo Con Tino, a 2-CD set of recordings from that tour, was released May 11, 2010, with Browne and Lindley touring together starting in June of that year. They played together at Glastonbury Festival in 2010, and they won an Independent Music Award for Best Live Performance Album in 2011.

== Instruments ==
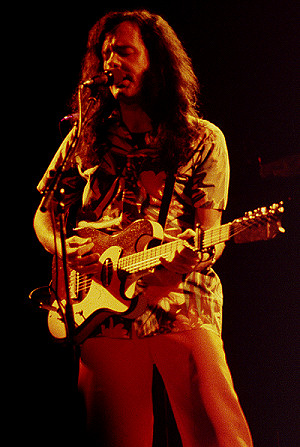
Lindley in Oslo, 1981

Lindley had a large collection of rare and unusual guitars and other instruments from the Middle East and various parts of the world. He listed and categorized many of them on his website but admitted that he had "absolutely no idea" how many instruments he owned and played, having gathered them since the 1960s. A journalist described his home in 1994 as containing a "tidal flood of instruments strewn all over the house. In every room. On the floor, balanced against the wall, lying atop cabinets and just literally occupying virtually every inch of available floor space."

== Personal life ==
Lindley married Joan Darrow, the sister of his musical colleague Chris Darrow from the band Kaleidoscope. In 1970, Joan and David Lindley had a daughter named Rosanne who became a folk singer with the Bright Mountain Choir in the 1990s, collaborating with the Mountain Goats. In 1995, Rosanne joined Lindley in a series of concerts with Ry Cooder and his son Joachim Cooder, billed as the Cooder–Lindley Family. The Lindleys lived in a quiet neighborhood of Claremont, California.

Lindley died after a long illness on March 3, 2023, at the age of 78. He had COVID-19 in 2020, which his family said developed into long COVID, with chronic kidney damage.

== Selected discography ==
Solo

=== Albums ===
Year	Title	US Billboard 200	Label	Notes
1981	El Rayo-X	83	Asylum	
1982	Win This Record!	—	Elektra	
1983	El Rayo Live	—	Elektra / Rhino	
1985	Mr. Dave	—	Wounded Bird	
1988	Very Greasy	174	Elektra	
1991	The Indian Runner	—		original soundtrack with Jack Nitzsche
1991	A World Out of Time	—	Shanachie Records	with Henry Kaiser in Madagascar
1992	In the Running	—	Elektra/East West Records	with Howard Jones
1994	The Sweet Sunny North	—	Shanachie Records	
1994	Wheels of the Sun	—	Hermans Records	by Kazu Matsui with Hani Naser
1994	Official Bootleg #1: Live in Tokyo Playing Real Good	—	Ulftone	with Hani Naser
1995	Song of Sacajawea	—	Rabbit Ears	
1995	Official Bootleg #2: Live All Over the Place Playing Even Better	—	Ulftone	with Hani Naser
2000	Twango Bango Deluxe	—		with Wally Ingram
2001	Twango Bango II	—		with Wally Ingram
2003	Twango Bango III	—		with Wally Ingram
2004	Live in Europe	—		with Wally Ingram
2007	David Lindley—Big Twang	—		

=== With other musicians ===
with Kaleidoscope

Year	Title	US Billboard 200	Label
1967	Side Trips	-	Epic
1967	A Beacon from Mars	—	Epic
1969	Incredible! Kaleidoscope	139	Epic
1970	Bernice	—	Epic

with Terry Reid

Year	Title	US Billboard 200	Label
1972	River	172	Atlantic
1976	Seed of Memory	—	ABC

with Jackson Browne

- 1973 : For Everyman (Asylum)
- 1974 : Late for the Sky (Asylum)
- 1976 : The Pretender (Asylum)
- 1977 : Running on Empty (Asylum)
- 1980 : Hold Out (Asylum)
- 1986 : Lives in the Balance (Asylum)
- 1989 : World in Motion (Elektra)
- 1993 : I'm Alive (Elektra)
- 1996 : Looking East (Elektra)
- 2010 : Love Is Strange: En Vivo Con Tino (Inside Recordings)

with Crosby & Nash

- 1975 : Wind on the Water (ABC)
- 1976 : Whistling Down the Wire (ABC)

with Rod Stewart

- 1975 : Atlantic Crossing (Warner Bros.)
- 1976 : A Night on the Town (Warner Bros.)
- 1988 : Out of Order (Warner Bros.)

with Warren Zevon

- 1976 : Warren Zevon
- 1987 : Sentimental Hygiene (Virgin)
- 1989 : Transverse City (Virgin)
- 1994 : Mutineer (Giant)
- 2003 : The Wind (Artemis)

with Ry Cooder

- 1978 : Jazz (Warner Bros.)
- 1979 : Bop Till You Drop (Warner Bros.)
- 1995 : Cooder-Lindley Family Live at the Vienna Opera House

with other artists

- 1967 : Songs of Leonard Cohen (Columbia) with Leonard Cohen
- 1969 : Elephant Mountain (RCA) with the Youngbloods
- 1971 : America (Warner Bros.) America
- 1973: Maria Muldaur (Reprise Records) Maria Muldaur
- 1974: Some Days You Eat the Bear (Elektra) Iain Matthews
- 1976: In the Pocket (Warner Bros) James Taylor
- 1977: Lonnie Mack and Pismo (Capitol) Lonnie Mack
- 1977 : Here You Come Again (RCA) with Dolly Parton
- 1978: Leo Sayer (Warner Bros.) with Leo Sayer
- 1979 : Restless Nights (Karla Bonoff album) (Columbia) with Karla Bonoff
- 1981 : There Goes the Neighborhood (Asylum) with Joe Walsh
- 1987 : Freight Train Heart with Jimmy Barnes
- 1987 : Trio (Warner Bros.) with Emmylou Harris, Linda Ronstadt and Dolly Parton
- 1988 : Ancient Heart (Reprise Records) with Tanita Tikaram
- 1988 : Everything (Columbia Records) with The Bangles
- 1989 : Good Evening (Warner Bros.) with Marshall Crenshaw
- 1990 : Under the Red Sky (Columbia) with Bob Dylan
- 1992 : Fat City (Columbia) with Shawn Colvin
- 1997: Cool & Unusual (Martin Simpson album) (Red House Records) with Martin Simpson
- 2003 : Oil (Cosmo Sex School Records) with Jerry Joseph and Dzuiks Küche
- 2006 : Both Sides of the Gun (Virgin) with Ben Harper
- 2008 : Insides Out (New West Records) with Jordan Zevon
- 2012 : The Devil You Know (Fantasy Records) with Rickie Lee Jones
- 2015 : Slide Guitar Summit with Arlen Roth (Aquinnah Records)
- 2017 : The Bucket List (Rocker Chick Media) with the Sound Field

=== Other appearances ===
Year	Title	Artist	Album	Note
1971	"Simple Man"	Graham Nash	Songs for Beginners	plays fiddle
1974	"Wild Tales"	Graham Nash	Wild Tales	plays electric slide guitar
1974	"Grave Concern"	Graham Nash	Wild Tales	plays electric slide guitar
1974	"Prison Song"	Graham Nash	Wild Tales	plays mandolin
1974	"Heart Like a Wheel"	Linda Ronstadt	Heart Like a Wheel	plays fiddle
1974	I Can't Help It (If I'm Still in Love with You)	Linda Ronstadt	Heart Like a Wheel	plays fiddle
1975	Love Is a Rose	Linda Ronstadt	Prisoner in Disguise	plays fiddle
1975	"The Sweetest Gift"	Linda Ronstadt	Prisoner in Disguise	plays fiddle
1975	"You Tell Me That I'm Falling Down"	Linda Ronstadt	Prisoner in Disguise	plays fiddle
1980	"Earth & Sky"	Graham Nash	Earth & Sky	plays rhythm guitar
1980	"Out on the Island"	Graham Nash	Earth & Sky	plays Hawaiian guitar
1980	"Skychild"	Graham Nash	Earth & Sky	plays lead guitar
1980	"Barrel of Pain"	Graham Nash	Earth & Sky	played lead guitar
1980	"In the 80's"	Graham Nash	Earth & Sky	plays guitar
1988	"Lost in You"	Rod Stewart	Out of Order	plays mandolin
1988	"The Wild Horse"	Rod Stewart	Out of Order	plays mandolin
1988	"Nobody Knows You When You're Down and Out"	Rod Stewart	Out of Order	plays slide guitar
1988	"Almost Illegal"	Rod Stewart	Out of Order	plays fiddle
2010	Racing in the Street ('78)	Bruce Springsteen & the E Street Band	The Promise	plays violin
2010	"Come On (Let's Go Tonight)"	Bruce Springsteen & the E Street Band	The Promise	plays violin
